= The Slow Rush Tour =

2020-23 concert tour by Tame Impala

- Tour by Tame Impala
- Promotional poster for North American tour dates in 2022.
- Location: North America; Europe; Oceania; Latin America
- Associated album: The Slow Rush
- Start date: March 9, 2020
- End date: March 25, 2023
- No. of shows: 72
- Supporting acts: Clairo; Sudan Archives; Perfume Genius; Junglepussy; Giorgio Poi; Nu Genea; Genesis Owusu; Sycco; Ladyhawke; Cuco

Tame Impala concert chronology
- World Tour 2019 (2019); The Slow Rush Tour (2020–23); Deadbeat Tour (2025–27)

The Slow Rush Tour was a concert tour by Tame Impala, the Australian psychedelic music project of Kevin Parker. In support of the project's fourth studio album, The Slow Rush (2020), the tour started on March 9, 2020, at the Pechanga Arena in San Diego, and concluded on March 25, 2023, at Lollapalooza Brazil in Brazil. Clairo, Sudan Archives, Perfume Genius, Junglepussy, Giorgio Poi, Nu Genea, Genesis Owusu, Sycco, Ladyhawke, and Cuco performed as the supporting acts.

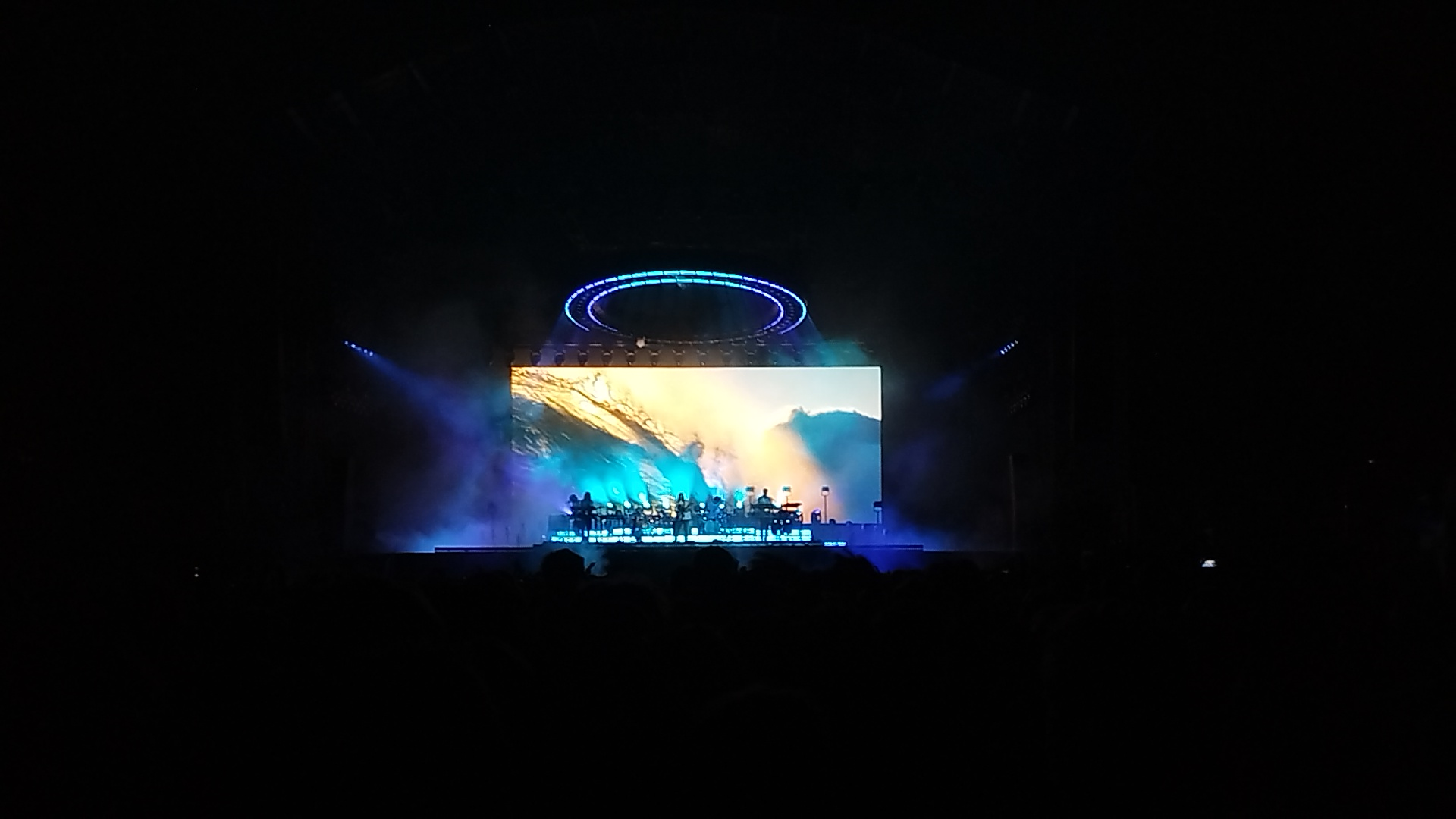
Tame Impala at Rock en Seine on 27 August 2022

== Background ==
After releasing the singles "Patience", "Borderline" and finishing their 2019 World Tour, Tame Impala would formally announce The Slow Rush on 25 October 2019.

Three more singles, "It Might Be Time", "Posthumous Forgiveness", and "Lost In Yesterday" would be released until the release of the album on 14 February 2020.

The initial Slow Rush Tour would be announced on December 9, 2019. However, only three dates were performed before the rest were ultimately cancelled or rescheduled due to the COVID-19 pandemic.

Rescheduled "Phase 1 Rushium Trials" tour dates along with extra dates were announced on June 22, 2021, with further "Slow Rush 2022 V.2 Clinical Trials" 2022 dates for North America, Europe, and Oceania being announced on December 7, 2021.

== Tour dates ==
List of 2020 concerts, showing date, city, country, venue, and opening act.
Date (2020)	City	Country	Venue	Opening Act
March 9	San Diego	United States	Pechanga Arena	Clairo
March 10	Inglewood (Note: Labelled as Los Angeles in promotional material.)	United States	The Forum	Clairo
March 11	Inglewood	United States	The Forum	Clairo

List of 2021 concerts, showing date, city, country, venue, and opening acts.
Date (2021)	City	Country	Venue	Opening Acts
September 7	Chicago	United States	United Center	Sudan Archives
September 10	George (Note: Labelled as Quincy in promotional material.)	United States	The Gorge Amphitheatre	Perfume Genius
September 12	Portland	United States	Moda Center	Sudan Archives
September 15	San Francisco	United States	Chase Center	Sudan Archives
September 17 (Note: The show on September 17, 2021 in Las Vegas was part of Life Is Beautiful Music & Art Festival 2021.)	Las Vegas	United States	Downtown Las Vegas	None
September 18	Glendale (Note: Labelled as Phoenix in promotional material.)	United States	Gila River Arena	Sudan Archives
September 20	Denver	United States	Ball Arena	Sudan Archives
September 23	Washington, D.C.	United States	Capital One Arena	Sudan Archives
September 25 (Note: The show on September 25, 2021 in Dover was part of Firefly Music Festival 2021.)	Dover	United States	Dover Motor Speedway	None
September 28	Atlanta	United States	State Farm Arena	Sudan Archives
October 31 (Note: The show on October 31, 2021 in San Francisco was part of Outside Lands 2021.)	San Francisco	United States	Golden Gate Park	None
November 2	Hollywood	United States	Hollywood Bowl	Perfume Genius
November 3	Hollywood	United States	Hollywood Bowl	Perfume Genius
November 7	Austin	United States	Frank Erwin Center	Sudan Archives
November 8	Houston	United States	White Oak Music Hall	Sudan Archives
November 9	Dallas	United States	American Airlines Center	Sudan Archives
November 13 (Note: The show on November 13, 2021 in Monterrey was part of Tecate Pa'l Norte 2021.)	Monterrey	Mexico	Fundidora Park	None
November 17	Zapopan	Mexico	Telmex Auditorium	None
November 20 (Note: The show on November 20, 2021 in Mexico City was part of Corona Capital 2021.)	Mexico City	Mexico	Autódromo Hermanos Rodríguez	None

List of 2022 concerts, showing date, city, country, venue, and opening acts.
Date (2022)	City	Country	Venue	Opening Acts
February 27 (Note: The show on February 27, 2022 in Tempe was part of Innings Festival 2022.)	Tempe	United States	Tempe Beach Park	None
March 4 (Note: The show on March 4, 2022 in Okeechobee was part of Okeechobee Music & Arts Festival 2022.)	Okeechobee	United States	Sunshine Grove	None
March 7	Pittsburgh	United States	Petersen Events Center	Junglepussy
March 9	Toronto	Canada	Scotiabank Arena	Junglepussy
March 10	Laval (Note: Labelled as Montreal in promotional material.)	Canada	Place Bell	Junglepussy
March 12	Uncasville	United States	Mohegan Sun Arena	Junglepussy
March 14	Brooklyn	United States	Barclays Center	Junglepussy
March 15	Brooklyn	United States	Barclays Center	Junglepussy
March 16	Boston	United States	TD Garden	Junglepussy
March 18	Hampton	United States	Hampton Coliseum	Junglepussy
March 19	Philadelphia	United States	Wells Fargo Center	Junglepussy
March 21	Asheville	United States	ExploreAsheville.com Arena	Junglepussy
March 22	Asheville	United States	ExploreAsheville.com Arena	Junglepussy
March 23	Nashville	United States	Bridgestone Arena	Junglepussy
March 25 (Note: The show on March 25, 2022 in New Orleans was part of BUKU Music + Art Project 2022.)	New Orleans	United States	Mardi Gras World	None
May 22 (Note: The show on May 22, 2022 in Gulf Shores was part of Hangout Music Festival 2022.)	Gulf Shores	United States	Gulf Shores Public Beach	None
May 24	Wilmington	United States	Live Oak Bank Pavillion	Automatic
May 26	Columbus	United States	KEMBA Live!	Automatic
May 28 (Note: The show on May 28, 2022 in Louisville was part of Forecastle Festival.)	Louisville	United States	Waterfront Park	None
June 2 (Note: The show on June 2, 2022 in Barcelona was part of Primavera Sound 2022.)	Barcelona	Spain	Parc del Fòrum	None
June 9 (Note: The show on June 9, 2022 in Porto was part of NOS Primavera Sound 2022.)	Porto	Portugal	Parque da Cidade	None
June 11 (Note: The show on June 11, 2022 in Barcelona was part of Primavera Sound 2022.)	Barcelona	Spain	Parc del Fòrum	None
August 11 (Note: The show on August 11, 2022 in Gothenburg was part of Way Out West 2022.)	Gothenburg	Sweden	Slottsskogen	None
August 14 (Note: The show on August 14, 2022 in Budapest was part of Sziget Festival 2022.)	Budapest	Hungary	Óbudai-Sziget	None
August 17	Pula	Croatia	Pula Arena	Mattiel
August 20 (Note: The show on August 14, 2022 in Hasselt was part of Pukkelpop 2022.)	Hasselt	Belgium	Domein Kiewit	None
August 22	Copenhagen	Denmark	Royal Arena	Mattiel
August 25 (Note: The show on August 25, 2022 in London was part of All Points East 2022.)	London	United Kingdom	Victoria Park	None
August 27 (Note: The show on August 27, 2022 in Saint-Cloud was part of Rock en Seine 2022.)	Saint-Cloud	France	Parc de Saint-Cloud	None
August 29	Amsterdam	Netherlands	AFAS Live	Perfume Genius
August 30	Amsterdam	Netherlands	AFAS Live	Perfume Genius
August 31	Amsterdam	Netherlands	AFAS Live	Perfume Genius
September 3 (Note: The show on September 3, 2022 in Stradbally was part of Electric Picnic 2022.)	Stradbally	Ireland	Stradbally Hall	None
September 7	Milan	Italy	Hippodrome of San Siro	Giorgio Poi & Nu Genea
September 10 (Note: The show on September 10, 2022 in Warsaw was part of On Air Festival 2022.)	Warsaw	Poland	Warsaw Babice Airport	None
October 15	Auckland	New Zealand	Spark Arena	Ladyhawke
October 18	Brisbane	Australia	Brisbane Entertainment Center	Genesis Owusu & Sycco
October 20	Sydney	Australia	Qudos Bank Arena	Genesis Owusu & Sycco
October 22	Melbourne	Australia	Rod Laver Arena	Genesis Owusu & Sycco
October 23	Melbourne	Australia	Rod Laver Arena	Genesis Owusu & Sycco
October 26	Adelaide	Australia	Adelaide Entertainment Center	Genesis Owusu & Sycco
October 29	Perth	Australia	RAC Arena	Genesis Owusu & Sycco

List of 2023 concerts, showing date, city, country, venue, and opening act.
Date (2022)	City	Country	Venue	Opening Act
March 10	Mexico City	Mexico	Palacio de los Deportes	Cuco
March 11	Mexico City	Mexico	Palacio de los Deportes	Cuco
March 18 (Note: The show on March 18, 2023 in San Isidro was part of Lollapalooza Argentina 2023.)	San Isidro	Argentina	Hipódromo de San Isidro	None
March 19 (Note: The show on March 19, 2023 in Santiago was part of Lollapalooza Chile 2023.)	Santiago	Chile	Bicentennial Park of Cerrillos	None
March 21 (Note: The show on March 21, 2023 in Santiago was part of Asunciónico 2023.)	Asunción	Paraguay	Parque Olímpico	None
March 22 (Note: The show on March 22, 2023 in Santiago was part of Asunciónico 2023.)	Asunción	Paraguay	Parque Olímpico	None
March 23 (Note: The show on March 23, 2023 in Bogotá was part of Estéreo Picnic 2023.)	Bogotá	Colombia	Centro de Eventos Briceño	None
March 25 (Note: The show on March 25, 2023 in São Paulo was part of Lollapalooza Brazil 2023.)	São Paulo	Brazil	Interlagos Circuit	None

=== Cancelled / Rescheduled shows ===
List of cancelled / rescheduled concerts, showing date, city, country, venue, opening acts, and reason for cancellation / rescheduled date.
Date	City	Country	Venue	Opening Acts	Reason
March 13, 2020	San Francisco	United States	Chase Center	Clairo	COVID-19 pandemic
March 19, 2020	Mexico City	Mexico	Foro Sol	MGMT & Clairo (Note: Both MGMT & Clairo were labeled as special guests in promotional material.)	COVID-19 pandemic
March 20, 2020 (Note: The show on March 20, 2020 in Monterrey would have been part of Tecate Pa'l Norte 2020.)	Monterrey	Mexico	Fundidora Park	None	COVID-19 pandemic
April 16, 2020	Auckland	New Zealand	Spark Arena	Khruangbin	COVID-19 pandemic
April 18, 2020	Brisbane	Australia	Brisbane Entertainment Centre	Khruangbin	COVID-19 pandemic
April 20, 2020	Sydney	Australia	Qudos Bank Arena	Khruangbin	COVID-19 pandemic
April 23, 2020	Melbourne	Australia	Rod Laver Arena	Khruangbin	COVID-19 pandemic
April 25, 2020	Adelaide	Australia	Adelaide Entertainment Centre	Khruangbin	COVID-19 pandemic
April 28, 2020	Perth	Australia	RAC Arena	Khruangbin	COVID-19 pandemic
May 23, 2020 (Note: The show on May 23, 2020 in London would have been part of All Points East 2020.)	London	United Kingdom	Victoria Park	None	COVID-19 pandemic
May 29, 2020	Chicago	United States	United Center	Perfume Genius	COVID-19 pandemic
May 30, 2020	Milwaukee	United States	Fiserv Forum	Perfume Genius	COVID-19 pandemic
May 31, 2020	Detroit	United States	Little Caesars Arena	Perfume Genius	COVID-19 pandemic
June 2, 2020	Toronto	Canada	Scotiabank Arena	Perfume Genius	COVID-19 pandemic
June 3, 2020	Montreal	Canada	Bell Centre	Perfume Genius	COVID-19 pandemic
June 5, 2020 (Note: The show on June 5, 2020 would have been part of Governors Ball Music Festival 2020.)	New York City	United States	Randalls Island	None	COVID-19 pandemic
June 6, 2020	Washington, D.C.	United States	Capital One Arena	Perfume Genius	COVID-19 pandemic
June 8, 2020	Charlotte	United States	Spectrum Center	Perfume Genius	COVID-19 pandemic
June 9, 2020	Georgia	United States	State Farm Arena	Perfume Genius	COVID-19 pandemic
June 11, 2020	Miami	United States	American Airlines Arena	Perfume Genius	COVID-19 pandemic
June 12, 2020	Orlando	United States	Amway Arena	Perfume Genius	COVID-19 pandemic
July 17, 2020	Saint Paul (Note: Labelled as Minneapolis in promotional material.)	United States	Xcel Energy Center	Perfume Genius	COVID-19 pandemic
July 19, 2020	St. Louis	United States	Enterprise Center	Perfume Genius	COVID-19 pandemic
July 20, 2020	Kansas City	United States	Sprint Center	Perfume Genius	COVID-19 pandemic
July 21, 2020	Tulsa	United States	BOK Center	Perfume Genius	COVID-19 pandemic
July 23, 2020	Austin	United States	Frank Erwin Center	Perfume Genius	COVID-19 pandemic
July 24, 2020	Dallas	United States	American Airlines Center	Perfume Genius	COVID-19 pandemic
July 25, 2020	Houston	United States	Toyota Center	Perfume Genius	COVID-19 pandemic
July 28, 2020	Glendale (Note: Labelled as Phoenix in promotional material.)	United States	Gila River Arena	Perfume Genius	COVID-19 pandemic
July 30, 2020	Denver	United States	Pepsi Center	Perfume Genius	COVID-19 pandemic
August 1, 2020	Salt Lake City	United States	Vivint Smart Home Arena	Perfume Genius	COVID-19 pandemic
August 3, 2020	Portland	United States	Moda Center	Perfume Genius	COVID-19 pandemic
August 5, 2020	Vancouver	Canada	Rogers Arena	Perfume Genius	COVID-19 pandemic
August 7, 2020	George	United States	The Gorge Amphitheatre	Perfume Genius	COVID-19 pandemic
September 4, 2021 (Note: The show on September 4, 2021 in Manchester would have been part of Bonnaroo Music and Arts Festival 2021.)	Manchester	United States	Great Stage Park	None	Rescheduled for September 2 to 5, 2021, but canceled due to flooding from Hurricane Ida.
November 6, 2021 (Note: The show on November 6, 2021 in Houston would have been part of Astroworld Festival 2021.)	Houston	United States	NRG Park	None	The festival was cancelled after the crowd crush that occurred on November 5.

== Setlists ==
=== 2020 Setlist ===
This setlist is from the March 10, 2020 concert in Inglewood. The three shows held in March 2020 all had the same setlist. However, when the tour started up again in 2021 the setlist would be almost entirely different.

Intro

1. "One More Year"
2. "Borderline"
3. "Reality in Motion"
4. "Posthumous Forgiveness"
5. "Alter Ego"
6. "Perfect Illusion" (Lady Gaga cover)
7. "Expectation"
8. "Lost In Yesterday"
9. "Elephant"
10. "Breathe Deeper"
11. "Apocalypse Dreams" (Note: With extended outro.)
12. "Past Life"
13. "Nangs"
14. "Feels Like We Only Go Backwards"
15. "New Person, Same Old Mistakes"
16. "Is It True"
17. "Glimmer"
18. "Let It Happen"
  Encore
19. "The Less I Know the Better"
20. "Eventually"

=== 2021 - 2023 Setlist ===
This setlist is from the March 16, 2022 concert in Boston. It does not represent all of the concerts for the duration of the tour.

Intro (Note: Aionwell Lab Intro Video.)

1. "One More Year
2. "Borderline"
3. "Nangs"
4. "Mind Mischief"
5. "Breathe Deeper"
6. "Beverly Laurel"
7. "Posthumous Forgiveness"
8. "Elephant"
9. "Lost In Yesterday"
10. "Apocalypse Dreams" (Note: With extended outro.)
11. "Gossip" (Note: Extended version, referred to as "Mutant Gossip".)
12. "Let It Happen"
13. "Feels Like We Only Go Backwards"
14. "Is It True"
15. "Glimmer"
16. "Eventually"
17. "Runway, Houses, City, Clouds"
18. "New Person, Same Old Mistakes"
  Encore
19. "The Less I Know the Better"
20. "One More Hour"

== Live band ==
- Kevin Parker – lead vocals, guitar, occasional synthesiser
- Jay Watson – synthesiser, keyboards, backing vocals
- Dominic Simper – guitar, synthesiser, keyboards
- Julien Barbagallo – drums, percussion, backing vocals
- Cam Avery – bass guitar, synthesiser, backing vocals
- Rafael Lazzaro-Colon – occasional live percussion
