= Tame Impala discography =

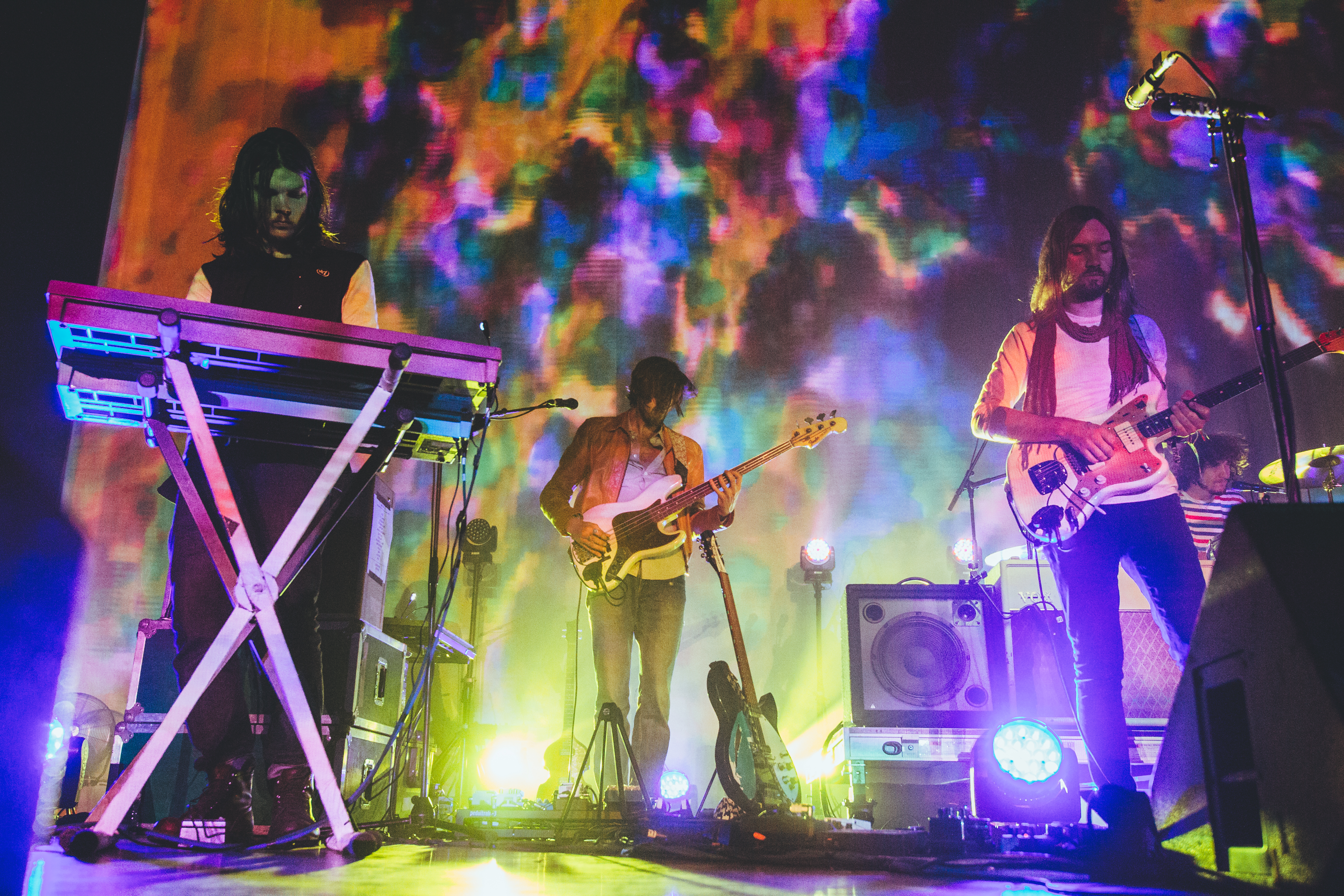
- Tame Impala performing live in 2014
- Studio albums: 5
- EPs: 4
- Live albums: 2
- Singles: 29

The discography of Tame Impala, a psychedelic rock project by the Australian musician Kevin Parker, consists of five studio albums, two live albums, four extended plays, twenty-nine singles, and several collaborations and compilation appearances.

Tame Impala were formed in Perth in 2007 after Parker's home recordings on Myspace drew attention from the independent record label Modular Recordings. The band signed to Modular among a bidding war and the band's eponymous debut EP was released in September 2008 to national acclaim; it topped the Australian Independent Record Labels Chart and peaked at number 10 on the Australian Singles Chart, as well as receiving widespread positive reviews and leading the band to appear on Triple J's Hottest 100 list at the end of the year. Tame Impala's debut studio album, Innerspeaker, was released in May 2010 and received international acclaim, as well as peaking at number 4 on the Australian Albums Chart and placing in the national charts in Belgium, the Netherlands and the United Kingdom. Innerspeaker was subsequently nominated for three Australian Recording Industry Association (ARIA) Music Awards, certified Gold by the ARIA and won the best-album accolade at both the Rolling Stone Awards and J Awards in 2011.

Lonerism, Tame Impala's second studio album, was released in October 2012. The album received "universal acclaim" according to Metacritic, and placed in the top 40 in Australia, Belgium, Ireland, New Zealand, the UK and the United States. The album's three supporting singles—"Elephant", "Feels Like We Only Go Backwards" and "Mind Mischief"—were moderate successes, particularly in the US where "Elephant" peaked at number 8 on the Billboard Alternative Songs chart. Lonerism was voted number one on several publications' year-end album lists, including NME, Loud and Quiet and Filter. Like Innerspeaker, Lonerism received best-album accolade at the Rolling Stone and J Awards; the album has since been certified Gold in Australia and Silver in the UK. It also garnered a Grammy Award nomination for Best Alternative Music Album at the 56th Annual Grammy Awards.

Tame Impala's third studio album, Currents, was released on 17 July 2015. Their fourth studio album, The Slow Rush, was released on 14 February 2020. The project's fifth studio album, Deadbeat, was released on 17 October 2025.

Kevin Parker also produces music for different artists under his own name.

== Albums ==
=== Studio albums ===
List of studio albums, with selected chart positions and certifications
| Title | Album details | Peak chart positions | | | | | | | | | | Certifications |
| Title | Album details | AUS | BEL (FL) | FRA | IRL | NLD | NZ | SWE | SWI | UK | US | Certifications |
|---|---|---|---|---|---|---|---|---|---|---|---|---|
| Innerspeaker | Released: 21 May 2010 (AUS); Label: Modular (128); Formats: 2×LP, CD, digital download | 4 | 73 | — | — | 83 | — | — | — | 144 | — (Note: Innerspeaker did not enter the US Billboard 200, but peaked at number 28 on the US Heatseekers Albums Chart.) | ARIA: Platinum; BPI: Gold |
| Lonerism | Released: 5 October 2012 (AUS); Label: Modular (161); Formats: 2×LP, CD, digital download | 4 | 38 | 106 | 39 | 45 | 34 | 50 | 60 | 14 | 34 | ARIA: Platinum; BPI: Gold; MC: Gold; RMNZ: Platinum |
| Currents | Released: 17 July 2015; Label: Modular, Interscope; Formats: 2×LP, CD, digital download | 1 | 9 | 16 | 7 | 1 | 7 | 22 | 11 | 3 | 4 | ARIA: Platinum; BPI: Platinum; MC: Gold; NVPI: Gold; RIAA: Platinum; RMNZ: 4× Platinum; SNEP: Gold |
| The Slow Rush | Released: 14 February 2020; Label: Modular, Interscope; Formats: 2×LP, CD, digital download | 1 | 2 | 11 | 3 | 2 | 3 | 8 | 3 | 3 | 3 | ARIA: Platinum; BPI: Gold; RIAA: Gold; RMNZ: Platinum; SNEP: Gold |
| Deadbeat | Released: 17 October 2025; Label: Columbia; Formats: 2×LP, CD, digital download | 2 | 5 | 9 | 6 | 2 | 5 | 11 | 8 | 4 | 4 | MC: Gold; RMNZ: Gold; SNEP: Gold |
"—" denotes a recording that did not chart or was not released in that territory.

=== Live albums ===
List of live albums, with selected chart positions
| Title | Album details | Peak chart positions | | | |
| Title | Album details | AUS | NLD Mid. | UK | US Vinyl |
|---|---|---|---|---|---|
| Live at the Corner | Released: 21 May 2010 (AUS); Label: Modular; Formats: Digital download | — | — | — | — |
| Live Versions | Released: 19 April 2014 (Worldwide); Label: Modular (184); Formats: 12", digital download | 91 | 47 | 147 | 7 |
"—" denotes a recording that did not chart or was not released in that territory.

== Extended plays ==
List of extended plays, with selected chart positions
| Title | Details | Peak chart positions | | | |
| Title | Details | AUS | UK DL | UK Indie | US Vinyl |
|---|---|---|---|---|---|
| Tame Impala (H.I.T.S. 003) | Released: 1 September 2008 (AUS); Label: Hole in the Sky (003); Formats: 12" | — | — | — | — |
| Tame Impala | Released: 8 October 2008 (AUS); Label: Modular (107); Formats: 10", 12", CD, digital download | 82 | — (Note: Tame Impala did not enter the UK Albums Chart, but peaked at number four on the UK Physical Singles Chart.) | 35 | 9 |
| Peace and Paranoia Tour 2013 (with The Flaming Lips) | Released: 29 October 2013 (US); Label: Lovely Sort of Death (N/A); Formats: 12" | — | — | — | — |
| The Slow Rush B-Sides and Remixes | Released: 18 February 2022; Label: Island Records; Formats: Streaming, download | — | 35 | — | — |
"—" denotes a recording that did not chart or was not released in that territory.

== Singles ==
=== As lead artist ===
List of singles as lead artist, with peak chart positions and certifications shown
| Title | Year | Peak chart positions | | | | | | | | | | Certifications | Album |
| Title | Year | AUS | BEL (FL) | CAN | IRL | LTU | NLD | NZ | POR | UK | US | Certifications | Album |
|---|---|---|---|---|---|---|---|---|---|---|---|---|---|
| "Sundown Syndrome" | 2009 | — (Note: "Sundown Syndrome" did not enter the Australian ARIA Singles Chart but peaked at number eight on the ARIA Hitseekers Chart.) | — | — | — | — | — | — | — | — (Note: "Sundown Syndrome" did not enter the UK Singles Chart, but peaked at number 71 on the UK Physical Singles Chart.) | — | | Non-album single |
| "Solitude Is Bliss" | 2010 | — (Note: "Solitude Is Bliss" did not enter the ARIA Singles Chart, but peaked at number six on the ARIA Physical Singles chart.) | — (Note: "Solitude Is Bliss" did not enter the Flemish Ultratop 50, but peaked at number 13 on the Ultratip chart.) | — | — | — | — | — | — | — (Note: "Solitude Is Bliss" did not enter the UK Singles Chart, but peaked at number 61 on the UK Physical Singles Chart.) | — | ARIA: Gold | Innerspeaker |
| "Lucidity" | 2010 | — | — | — | — | — | — | — | — | — | — | | Innerspeaker |
| "Expectation" | 2010 | — | — | — | — | — | — | — | — | — | — | | Innerspeaker |
| "Why Won't You Make Up Your Mind?" | 2011 | — | — | — | — | — | — | — | — | — (Note: "Why Won't You Make Up Your Mind?" did not enter the UK Singles Chart, but peaked at number 92 on the UK Physical Singles Chart.) | — | | Innerspeaker |
| "Elephant" | 2012 | 77 | — | — | — | — | — | — | — | 131 | — | ARIA: Platinum; BPI: Gold; MC: Gold; RIAA: Gold; RMNZ: Platinum | Lonerism |
| "Feels Like We Only Go Backwards" | 2012 | 74 | — (Note: "Feels Like We Only Go Backwards" did not enter the Flemish Ultratop 50, but peaked at number 67 on the Ultratip chart.) | — | — | — | — | — | — | — | — | ARIA: 3× Platinum; BPI: Platinum; RIAA: Platinum; RMNZ: 2× Platinum | Lonerism |
| "Mind Mischief" | 2013 | — | — | — | — | — | — | — | — | — (Note: "Mind Mischief" did not enter the UK Singles Chart, but peaked at number 28 on the UK Physical Singles Chart.) | — | ARIA: Gold | Lonerism |
| "Let It Happen" | 2015 | 84 | 19 | — | — | — | — (Note: "Let It Happen" did not enter the Dutch Single Top 100, but peaked at number 18 on the Dutch Single Tip chart.) | — | 123 | — | — | ARIA: 4× Platinum; BPI: Platinum; RIAA: Platinum; RMNZ: 2× Platinum | Currents |
| "'Cause I'm a Man" | 2015 | 80 | — | — | — | — | — | — | — | — | — | ARIA: Gold; RIAA: Gold; RMNZ: Gold | Currents |
| "Eventually" | 2015 | — (Note: "Eventually" did not enter the Australian ARIA Singles Chart but peaked at number 11 on the ARIA Hitseekers Chart.) | — | — | — | — | — | — | — | — | — | ARIA: 2× Platinum; BPI: Gold; RIAA: Platinum; RMNZ: Platinum | Currents |
| "The Less I Know the Better" | 2015 | 17 | 23 | — | — | 55 | — (Note: "The Less I Know the Better" did not enter the Netherlands' Single Top 100, but peaked at number seven on the Netherlands' Single Tip Chart.) | — | 63 | — (Note: "The Less I Know the Better" did not enter the UK Singles Chart, but peaked at number 59 on the UK Singles Sales Chart.) | — | ARIA: 10× Platinum; AFP: 4× Platinum; BRMA: Gold; BPI: 3× Platinum; MC: Gold; RIAA: 4× Platinum; RMNZ: 6× Platinum | Currents |
| "My Life" (with Zhu) | 2018 | — | — | — | — | — | — | — | — | — | — | | Ringos Desert |
| "Patience" (Note: "Patience" was included on the Japanese edition of The Slow Rush.) | 2019 | 63 | — (Note: "Patience" did not enter the Flemish Ultratop 50, but peaked at number three on the Ultratip chart.) | — | 68 | 48 | — | — (Note: "Patience" did not enter the NZ Top 40 Singles Chart, but peaked at number nine on the NZ Hot Singles Chart.) | — | 79 | — | ARIA: Gold | The Slow Rush |
| "Borderline" | 2019 | 58 | — (Note: "Borderline" did not enter the Flemish Ultratop 50, but charted as an extra tip on the Ultratip chart.) | — | 63 | 91 | — | — (Note: "Borderline" did not enter the NZ Top 40 Singles Chart, but peaked at number 17 on the NZ Hot Singles Chart.) | 96 | 78 | — | ARIA: 3× Platinum; BPI: Platinum; RIAA: Platinum; RMNZ: 3× Platinum | The Slow Rush |
| "It Might Be Time" | 2019 | — (Note: "It Might Be Time" did not enter the ARIA Top 100 Singles Chart, but peaked at number 12 on the ARIA Top 20 Australian Artist Singles Chart.) | — (Note: "It Might Be Time" did not enter the Flemish Ultratop 50, but peaked at number 7 on the Ultratip chart.) | — | — | — | — | — | — | — | — | ARIA: Gold | The Slow Rush |
| "Posthumous Forgiveness" | 2019 | — (Note: "Posthumous Forgiveness" did not enter the ARIA Top 100 Singles Chart, but peaked at number 18 on the ARIA Top 20 Australian Artist Singles Chart.) | — (Note: "Posthumous Forgiveness" did not enter the Flemish Ultratop 50, but charted as an extra tip on the Ultratip chart.) | — | — | — | — | — | 135 | — | — | | The Slow Rush |
| "Lost in Yesterday" | 2020 | 65 | — (Note: "Lost in Yesterday" did not enter the Flemish Ultratop 50, but peaked at number four on the Ultratip chart.) | — | 78 | 80 | — (Note: "Lost in Yesterday" did not enter the Netherlands' Single Top 100, but peaked at number 26 on the Netherlands' Single Tip Chart.) | — | 129 | 89 | — | ARIA: Gold; BPI: Silver; RIAA: Gold; RMNZ: Gold | The Slow Rush |
| "Breathe Deeper" | 2020 | 55 | — | — | 51 | 84 | — | — (Note: "Breathe Deeper" did not enter the NZ Top 40 Singles Chart, but peaked at number nine on the NZ Hot Singles Chart.) | 95 | 59 | — | ARIA: Gold; RIAA: Gold; RMNZ: Gold | The Slow Rush |
| "Is It True" | 2020 | — | — (Note: "Is It True" did not enter the Flemish Ultratop 50, but peaked at number seven on the Ultratip chart.) | — | — | — | — | — | — | — | — | ARIA: Platinum; BPI: Silver; RIAA: Gold; RMNZ: Gold | The Slow Rush |
| "No Choice" | 2021 | — | — | — | — | — | — | — (Note: "No Choice" did not enter the NZ Top 40 Singles Chart, but peaked at number 30 on the NZ Hot Singles Chart.) | — | — | — | | The Slow Rush B-Sides and Remixes |
| "The Boat I Row" | 2022 | — | — | — | — | — | — | — (Note: "The Boat I Row" did not enter the NZ Top 40 Singles Chart, but peaked at number 22 on the NZ Hot Singles Chart.) | — | — | — | | The Slow Rush B-Sides and Remixes |
| "Wings of Time" | 2023 | — | — | — | — | — | — | — | — | — | — | | Dungeons & Dragons: Honor Among Thieves |
| "No More Lies" (with Thundercat) | 2023 | — | — | — | — | — | — | — (Note: "No More Lies" did not enter the NZ Top 40 Singles Chart, but peaked at number 23 on the NZ Hot Singles Chart.) | — | — (Note: "No More Lies" did not enter the UK Singles Chart, but peaked at number 91 on the UK Singles Sales Chart.) | — | | Distracted |
| "End of Summer" | 2025 | — (Note: "End of Summer" did not enter the ARIA Top 100 Singles Chart, but peaked at number 17 on the ARIA Top 20 Australian Artist Singles Chart.) | — | — | 65 | — | — | — (Note: "End of Summer" did not enter the NZ Top 40 Singles Chart, but peaked at number seven on the NZ Hot Singles Chart.) | — | 87 | — (Note: "End of Summer" did not enter the Billboard Hot 100, but peaked at number 3 on the Bubbling Under Hot 100 chart.) | | Deadbeat |
| "Loser" | 2025 | 7 | 46 | 15 | 11 | 8 | 47 | 10 | 50 | 10 | 18 | AFP: Gold; BPI: Silver; RMNZ: Gold | Deadbeat |
| "Dracula" (solo or remix with Jennie) | 2025 | 4 | 26 | 2 | 3 | 4 | 9 | 9 | 5 | 2 | 3 | ARIA: 4× Platinum; BPI: Platinum; AFP: Gold; MC: 2× Platinum; NVPI: Gold; RIAA: Platinum; RMNZ: Platinum | Deadbeat |
| "My Old Ways" | 2025 | 61 | — | 56 | 37 | 51 | 72 | — (Note: "My Old Ways" did not enter the NZ Top 40 Singles Chart, but peaked at number one on the NZ Hot Singles Chart.) | 47 | 39 | 56 | | Deadbeat |
| "Hummer" | 2026 | — | — | — | — | — | — | — (Note: "Hummer" did not enter the NZ Top 40 Singles Chart, but it peaked at number 35 on the NZ Hot Singles Chart.) | — | — | — | | Sending Hearts to All My Dearies |
"—" denotes a recording that did not chart or was not released in that territory.

=== As featured artist ===
List of singles as featured artist, with peak chart positions and certifications shown
| Title | Year | Peak chart positions | | | | | | | | | | Certifications | Album |
| Title | Year | AUS | CAN | FRA | IRL | LTU | NZ | POR | UK | US | WW | Certifications | Album |
|---|---|---|---|---|---|---|---|---|---|---|---|---|---|
| "Daffodils" (Mark Ronson featuring Kevin Parker) | 2015 | — | — | — | — | — | — | — | — | — | — | | Uptown Special |
| "Only You" (Theophilus London featuring Tame Impala) | 2018 | — | — | — | — | — | — | — | — | — | — | | Bebey |
| "Whiplash" (Theophilus London featuring Tame Impala) | 2019 | — | — | — | — | — | — | — | — | — | — | | Bebey |
| "Call My Phone Thinking I'm Doing Nothing Better" (The Streets featuring Tame Impala) | 2020 | — | — | — | — | — | — | — | — | — | — | | None of Us Are Getting Out of This Life Alive |
| "Turn Up the Sunshine" (Diana Ross featuring Tame Impala) | 2022 | — | — | — | — | — | — | — | — (Note: "Turn Up the Sunshine" did not enter the UK Singles Chart, but peaked at number 57 on the UK Singles Downloads Chart.) | — | — | | Minions: The Rise of Gru |
| "New Gold" (Gorillaz featuring Tame Impala and Bootie Brown) | 2022 | 44 | 83 | — | 36 | 52 | — (Note: "New Gold" did not enter the NZ Top 40 Singles Chart, but peaked at number 2 on the NZ Hot Singles Chart.) | 196 | 56 | — (Note: "New Gold" did not enter the Billboard Hot 100, but peaked at number 4 on the Bubbling Under Hot 100 chart.) | 112 | BPI: Silver; MC: Gold; RMNZ: Platinum | Cracker Island |
| "One Night/All Night" (Justice featuring Tame Impala) | 2024 | — | — | — | — | — | — (Note: "One Night/All Night" did not enter the NZ Top 40 Singles Chart, but peaked at number 27 on the NZ Hot Singles Chart.) | — | — | — | — | | Hyperdrama |
| "Neverender" (Justice featuring Tame Impala) | 2024 | — | — | 157 | — | — | — (Note: "Neverender" did not enter the NZ Top 40 Singles Chart, but peaked at number 8 on the NZ Hot Singles Chart.) | — | — (Note: "Neverender" did not enter the UK Singles Chart, but peaked at number 33 on the UK Physical Singles Chart.) | — | — | SNEP: Gold | Hyperdrama |
| "Flower in a Hurricane" (Justice featuring Tame Impala, SZA, and King Gizzard & the Lizard Wizard) | 2026 | 17 | 42 | 50 | 16 | 7 | 27 | 112 | 9 | 62 | 52 | | Grand Theft Auto VI: The Album |
"—" denotes a recording that did not chart or was not released in that territory.

=== Promotional singles ===
List of promotional singles, with year released and album shown
| Title | Year | Peak chart positions | | | | Certifications | Album |
| Title | Year | MEX Air. | NZ Hot | UK Phys. | US Rock | Certifications | Album |
|---|---|---|---|---|---|---|---|
| "Apocalypse Dreams" | 2012 | — | — | — | — | | Lonerism |
| "Be Above It" | 2013 | 48 | — | 55 | — | | Lonerism |
| "Disciples" | 2015 | — | — | — | — | RIAA: Gold; RMNZ: Gold | Currents |
| "Breathe Deeper" (Lil Yachty Remix) | 2021 | — | 35 | — | 47 | | The Slow Rush Deluxe Box Set |
"—" denotes a recording that did not chart or was not released in that territory.

== Other charted and certified songs ==
List of non-single chart appearances
| Title | Year | Peak chart positions | | | | | | | | | | Certifications | Album |
| Title | Year | AUS | CAN | FRA | IRL | NZ Hot | POR | SWE Heat. | UK Stream | US | US Rock | Certifications | Album |
|---|---|---|---|---|---|---|---|---|---|---|---|---|---|
| "Skeleton Tiger" | 2008 | — (Note: "Skeleton Tiger" did not enter the Australian ARIA Singles Chart but peaked at number 16 on the ARIA Hitseekers Chart.) | — | — | — | — | — | — | — | — | — | | Tame Impala |
| "Half Full Glass of Wine" | 2008 | — | — | — | — | — | — | — | — | — | — | ARIA: Gold | Tame Impala |
| "Nangs" | 2016 | — | — | — | — | — | — | — | — | — | — | BPI: Silver; RIAA: Gold; RMNZ: Gold | Currents |
| "The Moment" | 2016 | — | — | — | — | — | — | — | — | — | — | ARIA: Gold; RIAA: Gold; RMNZ: Gold | Currents |
| "Yes I'm Changing" | 2016 | — | — | — | — | — | — | — | — | — | — | ARIA: Gold; BPI: Silver; RIAA: Gold; RMNZ: Gold | Currents |
| "Love/Paranoia" | 2016 | — | — | — | — | — | — | — | — | — | — | RIAA: Gold | Currents |
| "New Person, Same Old Mistakes" | 2016 | — (Note: "New Person, Same Old Mistakes" did not enter the ARIA Top 100 Singles Chart, but peaked at number 49 on the ARIA Top 50 Australian Artist on Replay Singles Chart.) | — | — | — | — | — | — | — | — | 38 | ARIA: Gold; BPI: Platinum; RIAA: Platinum; RMNZ: Platinum | Currents |
| "List of People (To Try and Forget About)" | 2017 | — | — | — | — | — | — | — | — | — | 39 | | Currents: Collector's Edition |
| "Skeletons" (Travis Scott featuring Pharrell Williams, Tame Impala, and the Weeknd) | 2018 | — | 42 | 110 | — | — | 61 | 12 | 81 | 47 | — | RIAA: Platinum; MC: 2× Platinum; BPI: Silver | Astroworld |
| "One More Year" | 2020 | 85 | — | — | 65 | 14 | 114 | — | — | — | 7 | | The Slow Rush |
| "Instant Destiny" | 2020 | — (Note: "Instant Destiny" did not enter the ARIA Top 100 Singles Chart, but peaked at number 17 on the ARIA Top 20 Australian Artist Singles Chart.) | — | — | — | 18 | 151 | — | — | — | 9 | | The Slow Rush |
| "Tomorrow's Dust" | 2020 | — | — | — | — | — | 195 | — | — | — | 12 | | The Slow Rush |
| "On Track" | 2020 | — | — | — | — | — | — | — | — | — | 13 | | The Slow Rush |
| "Glimmer" | 2020 | — | — | — | — | — | — | — | — | — | 17 | | The Slow Rush |
| "One More Hour" | 2020 | — | — | — | — | — | — | — | — | — | 15 | RIAA: Gold; RMNZ: Gold | The Slow Rush |
| "Is It True" (Four Tet Remix) | 2020 | — | — | — | — | 39 | — | — | — | — | — | | "Is It True" single |
| "Retina Show" | 2023 | — | — | — | — | 23 | — | — | — | — | — | | Lonerism (10 Year Anniversary) |
| "Journey to the Real World" | 2023 | — | — | — | — | — | — | — | — | — | 14 | | Barbie the Album |
| "Neverender" (Kaytranada remix) (Justice featuring Tame Impala) | 2024 | — | — | — | — | 33 | — | — | — | — | — | | Neverender (Remixes) |
| "No Reply" | 2025 | — (Note: "No Reply" did not enter the ARIA Top 100 Singles Chart, but peaked at number 10 on the ARIA Top 20 Australian Artist Singles Chart.) | — | — | — | 5 | 175 | — | — | — (Note: "No Reply" did not enter the Billboard Hot 100, but peaked at number 5 on the Bubbling Under Hot 100 chart.) | 17 | | Deadbeat |
| "Oblivion" | 2025 | — (Note: "Oblivion" did not enter the ARIA Top 100 Singles Chart, but peaked at number 11 on the ARIA Top 20 Australian Artist Singles Chart.) | — | — | — | 7 | — | — | — | — (Note: "Oblivion" did not enter the Billboard Hot 100, but peaked at number 19 on the Bubbling Under Hot 100 chart.) | 21 | | Deadbeat |
| "Not My World" | 2025 | — (Note: "Not My World" did not enter the ARIA Top 100 Singles Chart, but peaked at number 15 on the ARIA Top 20 Australian Artist Singles Chart.) | — | — | — | — | — | — | — | — | 24 | | Deadbeat |
| "Piece of Heaven" | 2025 | — (Note: "Piece of Heaven" did not enter the ARIA Top 100 Singles Chart, but peaked at number 14 on the ARIA Top 20 Australian Artist Singles Chart.) | — | — | — | 8 | — | — | — | — | 23 | | Deadbeat |
| "Obsolete" | 2025 | — (Note: "Obsolete" did not enter the ARIA Top 100 Singles Chart, but peaked at number 13 on the ARIA Top 20 Australian Artist Singles Chart.) | — | — | — | — | — | — | — | — | 22 | | Deadbeat |
| "See You on Monday (You're Lost)" | 2025 | — | — | — | — | — | — | — | — | — | 36 | | Deadbeat |
| "Afterthought" | 2025 | — (Note: "Afterthought" did not enter the ARIA Top 100 Singles Chart, but peaked at number 17 on the ARIA Top 20 Australian Artist Singles Chart.) | — | — | — | — | — | — | — | — | 27 | | Deadbeat |
"—" denotes a recording that did not chart or was not released in that territory.

== Music videos ==
List of music videos, showing year released and directors
| Title | Year | Director(s) |
|---|---|---|
| "Half Full Glass of Wine" | 2008 | Special Problems (Cut Off Your Hands, Mercy Arms) |
| "Solitude Is Bliss" | 2010 | Megaforce |
| "Lucidity" | 2010 | Robert Hales |
| "Expectation" | 2011 | Clemens Habicht |
| "Elephant" | 2012 | Yoshi Sodeoka |
| "Feels Like We Only Go Backwards" | 2012 | Joe Pelling and Becky Sloan |
| "Mind Mischief" | 2013 | David Wilson |
| "Cause I'm a Man" | 2015 | Nicky Smith |
| "Cause I'm a Man" (Live) | 2015 | Dan Dipaola & Megan McShane |
| "Let It Happen" | 2015 | David Wilson |
| "The Less I Know the Better" | 2015 | Canada |
| "Lost in Yesterday" | 2020 | Terri Timely (Ian Kibbey and Corey Creasey) |
| "Is It True" | 2020 | |
| "Breathe Deeper" | 2020 | Butt Studio |
| "End of Summer" | 2025 | Julian Klincewicz |
| "Loser" | 2025 | Sam Kristofski |
| "Dracula" | 2025 | Julian Klincewicz |

== Guest appearances ==
| Title | Year | Other artist(s) | Album |
|---|---|---|---|
| "Big City Lights" | 2008 | Canyons | The Lovemore EP |
| "Dawn" | 2010 | Gilbere Forte, Gembala | 87 Dreams |
| "Tonight" | 2011 | Canyons | Keep Your Dreams |
| "When I See You Again" | 2011 | Canyons | Keep Your Dreams |
| "Children of the Moon" | 2012 | The Flaming Lips | The Flaming Lips and Heady Fwends |
| "That's All for Everyone" | 2012 | none | Just Tell Me That You Want Me: A Tribute to Fleetwood Mac |
| "Backwards" | 2014 | Kendrick Lamar | Divergent: Original Motion Picture Soundtrack |
| "Summer Breaking" | 2015 | Mark Ronson | Uptown Special |
| "Leaving Los Feliz" | 2015 | Mark Ronson | Uptown Special |
| "Skeletons" | 2018 | Travis Scott, Pharrell Williams, the Weeknd | Astroworld |
| "Journey to the Real World" | 2023 | none | Barbie the Album |

== Remixes ==
| Title | Year | Artist(s) | Album |
|---|---|---|---|
| "Vital Signs" (Tame Impala Cover) | 2010 | Midnight Juggernauts | The Surplus Maximus EP |
| "End of Line" (Tame Impala Remix) | 2011 | Daft Punk | Tron: Legacy Reconfigured |
| "Waves" (Tame Impala Remix) | 2016 | Miguel | Rogue Waves |
| "Guilty Conscience" (Tame Impala Remix) | 2020 | 070 Shake | Non-album single |
| "To The Island" (Tame Impala Remix) | 2021 | Crowded House | Non-album single |
| "Edge of Reality" (Tame Impala Remix) | 2022 | Elvis Presley | Elvis (Original Motion Picture Soundtrack) |

== Songwriting and production discography ==
=== Albums ===
List of albums produced by Kevin Parker
| Album | Year | Artist |
|---|---|---|
| Beard, Wives, Denim | 2012 | Pond |
| Melody's Echo Chamber | 2012 | Melody's Echo Chamber |
| Hobo Rocket | 2013 | Pond |
| Mink Mussel Manticore | 2014 | Mink Mussel Creek |
| Man It Feels Like Space Again | 2015 | Pond |
| Koi Child | 2016 | Koi Child |
| The Weather | 2017 | Pond |
| Tasmania | 2019 | Pond |
| Unfold | 2022 | Melody's Echo Chamber |
| Radical Optimism | 2024 | Dua Lipa |

=== Tracks ===
List of tracks produced or written (or both) by Kevin Parker
| Title | Year | Artist(s) | Album | Notes |
|---|---|---|---|---|
| "Aydin" | 2013 | Discodeine | Swimmer | Songwriter |
| "Same Ol' Mistakes" | 2016 | Rihanna | Anti | Songwriter, producer |
| "Perfect Illusion" | 2016 | Lady Gaga | Joanne | Songwriter, producer |
| "Tomorrow" | 2018 | Kali Uchis | Isolation | Songwriter, producer |
| "Violent Crimes" | 2018 | Kanye West | Ye | Songwriter |
| "Skeletons" | 2018 | Travis Scott | Astroworld | Songwriter, producer |
| "Find U Again" (featuring Camila Cabello) | 2018 | Mark Ronson | Late Night Feelings | Songwriter, producer |
| "Repeat After Me (Interlude)" | 2020 | The Weeknd | After Hours | Songwriter, producer |
| "Venice" | 2020 | Cruz Patterson | Non-album single | Songwriter, producer |
| "Dive" | 2020 | Kid Cudi | Man on the Moon III: The Chosen | Songwriter |
| "Houdini" | 2023 | Dua Lipa | Radical Optimism | Songwriter, producer |
| "Training Season" | 2024 | Dua Lipa | Radical Optimism | Songwriter, producer |
| "Illusion" | 2024 | Dua Lipa | Radical Optimism | Songwriter, producer |
| "End of an Era" | 2024 | Dua Lipa | Radical Optimism | Songwriter, producer |
| "Whatcha Doing" | 2024 | Dua Lipa | Radical Optimism | Songwriter, producer |
| "French Exit" | 2024 | Dua Lipa | Radical Optimism | Songwriter, producer |
| "Happy For You" | 2024 | Dua Lipa | Radical Optimism | Songwriter, producer |
| "Merry Go Round" | 2026 | BTS | Arirang | Songwriter, producer |

=== Instrumentation and technical credits ===
| Release | Year | Artist | Additional information |
|---|---|---|---|
| Beard, Wives, Denim | 2012 | Pond | Drums in all tracks and mastering |
| Melody's Echo Chamber | 2012 | Melody's Echo Chamber | Instrumentation and mixing |
| Mink Mussel Manticore | 2014 | Mink Mussel Creek | Drums in all tracks, mixing and mastering |
| The Cosmic Microwave Background | 2014 | Shiny Joe Ryan | Mastering |
| Uptown Special | 2015 | Mark Ronson | Drums on "Uptown's First Finale" and "Crack in the Pearl", backing vocals on "Heavy and Rolling" |
| Wildflower | 2016 | The Avalanches | Drums on "Going Home" |
| Tasmania | 2019 | Pond | Drums on "Doctor's In" |
