= World Tour 2019 =

2019 concert tour by Tame Impala

- Tour by Tame Impala
- Promotional poster for North American tour dates in 2019.
- Location: North America; Europe; Australia
- Start date: April 11, 2019
- End date: October 11, 2019
- No. of shows: 44
- Supporting acts: Haiku Hands; Mdou Moctar; ALASKALASKA; Mosa Wild; Velvet Negroni; Yeasayer; Blood Orange; Municipal Waste; Altın Gün

Tame Impala concert chronology
- Currents Tour (2015–18); World Tour 2019 (2019); The Slow Rush Tour (2020–23)

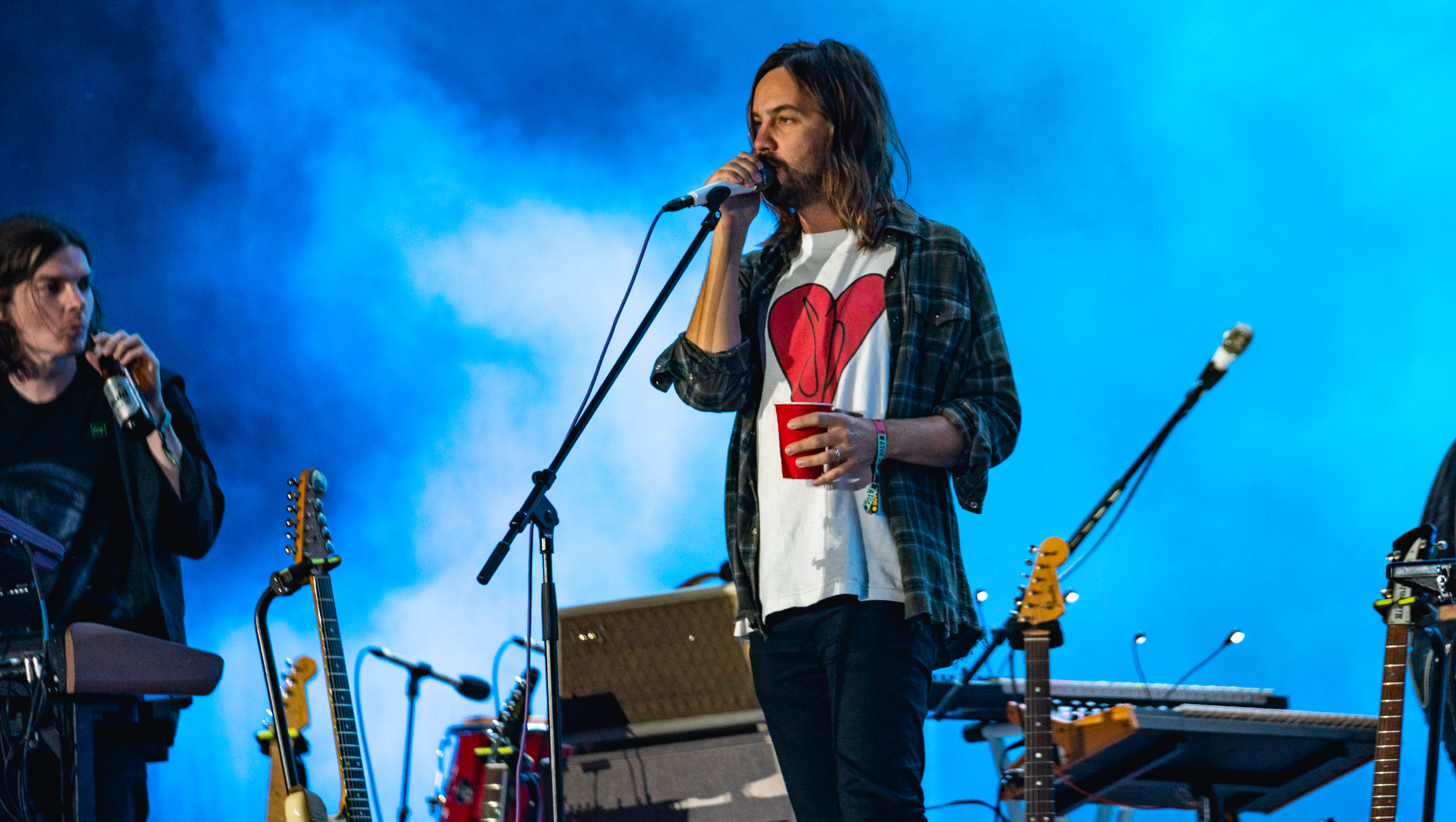
Kevin Parker and Dominic Simper performing as Tame Impala at Flow Festival 2019

The World Tour 2019 was a concert tour by Tame Impala, the Australian psychedelic music project of Kevin Parker. It began on April 11, 2019, at the Fox Theater in Pomona, and concluded on October 11, 2019 at Austin City Limits 2019 in Austin. Haiku Hands, Mdou Moctar, ALASKALASKA, Mosa Wild, Velvet Negroni, Yeasayer, Blood Orange, Municipal Waste, and Altın Gün performed as the supporting acts.

== Background ==
After releasing the singles "Patience" and "Borderline", Tame Impala would embark on their 2019 World Tour in buildup for the release of the yet to be announced fourth studio album, The Slow Rush.

On 14 November 2018, it was revealed that Tame Impala would headline Shaky Knees Festival in 2019 alongside Beck, Cage The Elephant, and Incubus.

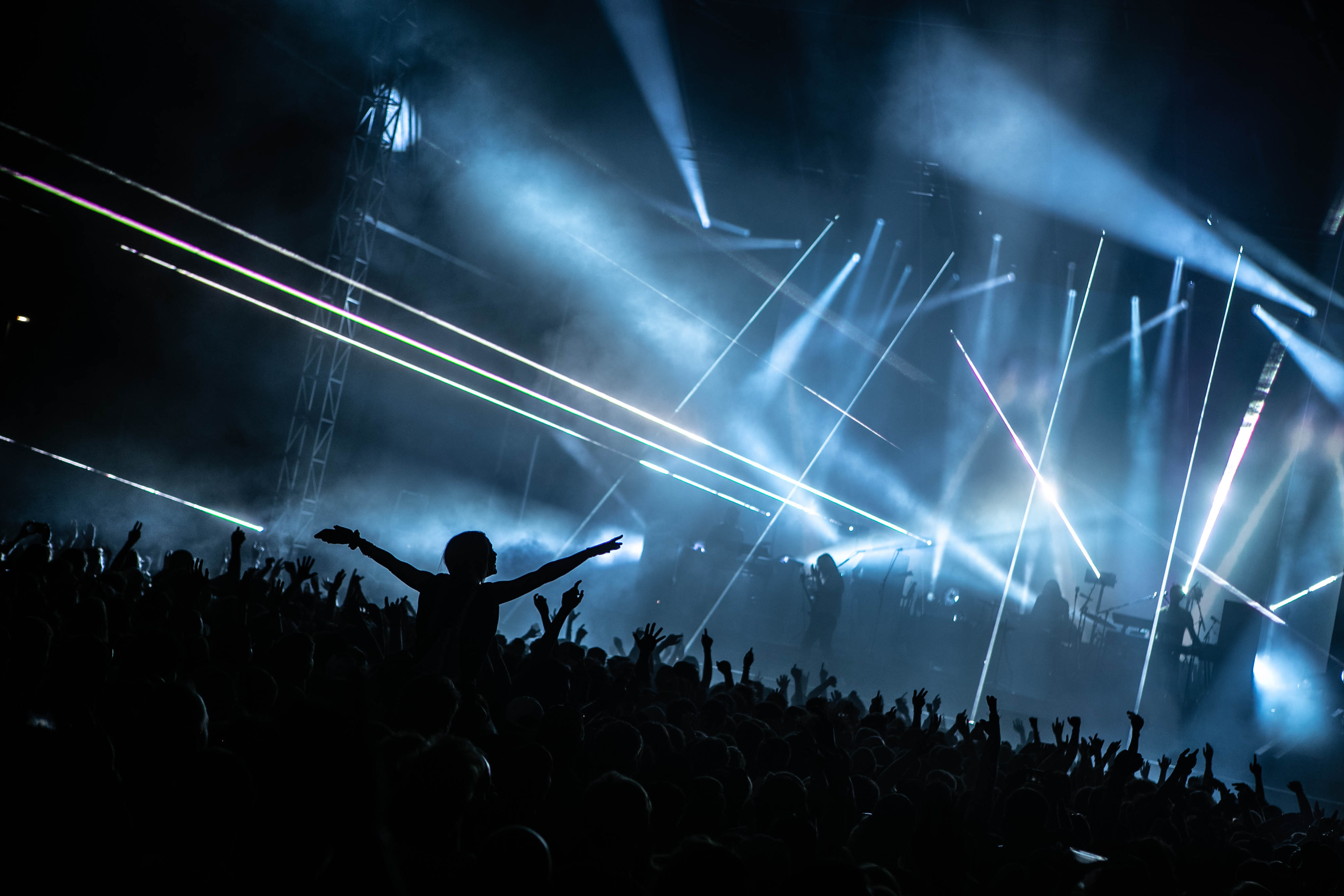
Tame Impala at Surly Brewing in 2019

On 2 January 2019, Tame Impala was revealed to be one of the headliners at Coachella that year.

On 29 January 2019, Tame Impala announced dates for the tour, with tickets going on sale 1 February 2019.

Additional dates in the summer were announced on 22 April 2019.

Three more singles, "It Might Be Time", "Posthumous Forgiveness", and "Lost In Yesterday" would be released until the release of the album on 14 February 2020.

The initial Slow Rush Tour would be announced on December 9, 2019. However, only three dates were performed before the rest were ultimately cancelled or rescheduled due to the COVID-19 pandemic.

== Tour dates ==
List of 2019 concerts, showing date, city, country, venue, and supporting acts.
Date (2019)	City	Country	Venue	Supporting Acts
April 11	Pomona	United States	Fox Theater	Haiku Hands
April 13 (Note: The show on April 13, 2019 in Indio was part of Coachella 2019 Weekend 1.)	Indio	United States	Empire Polo Club	None
April 20 (Note: The show on April 20, 2019 in Indio was part of Coachella 2019 Weekend 2.)	Indio	United States	Empire Polo Club	None
May 2	Nashville	United States	Ascend Amphitheater	Mdou Moctar
May 3	Ashville	United States	U.S. Cellular Center	Mdou Moctar
May 5 (Note: The show on May 5, 2019 in Georgia was part of Shaky Knees Music Festival 2019.)	Georgia	United States	Central Park	None
May 6	St. Augustine	United States	St. Augustine Amphitheatre	Mdou Moctar
May 7	Miami Beach	United States	The Fillmore Miami Beach at Jackie Gleason Theater	Mdou Moctar
May 11 (Note: The show on May 11, 2019 in Georgia was part of Corona Capital Guadalajara 2019.)	Zapopan	Mexico	Estadio Akron	None
May 25 (Note: The show on May 25, 2019 in Boston was part of Boston Calling 2019.)	Boston	United States	Harvard Athletic Complex	None
May 31 (Note: The show on May 31, 2019 in Barcelona was part of Primavera Sound 2019.)	Barcelona	Spain	Parc del Fòrum	None
June 2 (Note: The show on June 2, 2019 in Paris was part of We Love Green 2019.)	Paris	France	Bois de Vincennes	None
June 5 (Note: The show on June 5, 2019 in Gothenburg was part of Garden Festival 2019.)	Gothenburg	Sweden	Trädgårdsföreningen	None
June 6 (Note: The show on June 6, 2019 in Aarhus was part of NorthSide Festival 2019.)	Aarhus	Denmark	Ådalen	None
June 8	London	United Kingdom	The O2 Arena	ALASKALASKA
June 21 (Note: The show on June 21, 2019 in Scheeßel was part of Hurricane Festival 2019.)	Scheeßel	Germany	Eichenring	None
June 22 (Note: The show on June 22, 2019 in Neuhausen ob Eck was part of Southside Festival 2019.)	Neuhausen ob Eck	Germany	take-off GewerbePark	None
June 24	Blackpool	United Kingdom	Empress Ballroom	Mosa Wild
June 26	Dublin	Ireland	3Arena	Mosa Wild
June 28 (Note: The show on June 28, 2019 in Pilton was part of Glastonbury Festival 2019.)	Pilton	United Kingdom	Worthy Farm	None
July 19 (Note: The show on July 19, 2019 in Bryon Bay was part of Splendour in the Grass 2019.)	Byron Bay	Australia	North Byron Parklands	None
July 26	Toronto	Canada	Budweiser Stage	Velvet Negroni
July 28 (Note: The show on July 28, 2019 in Detroit was part of Mo Pop Festival 2019.)	Detroit	United States	West Riverfront Park	None
July 30	Minneapolis	United States	Surly Brewing Festival Field	Velvet Negroni & DJ Jake Rudh
July 31	Minneapolis	United States	Surly Brewing Festival Field	Velvet Negroni & DJ Jake Rudh
August 2 (Note: The show on August 2, 2019 in Chicago was part of Lollapalooza 2019.)	Chicago	United States	Grant Park	None
August 4 (Note: The show on August 4, 2019 in Montreal was part of Osheaga Festival 2019.)	Montreal	Canada	Parc Jean-Drapeau	None
August 8 (Note: The show on August 8, 2019 in Montreal was part of Øyafestivalen 2019.)	Oslo	Norway	Tøyenparken	None
August 10 (Note: The show on August 10, 2019 in Helsinki was part of Flow Festival 2019.)	Helsinki	Finland	Suvilahti	None
August 13	Berlin	Germany	Max-Schmeling-Halle	Yeasayer & Blood Orange
August 15 (Note: The show on August 15, 2019 in Saint-Malo was part of La Route du Rock 2019.)	Saint-Malo	France	Fort de Saint-Père	None
August 17 (Note: The show on August 17, 2019 in Hasselt was part of Pukkelpop 2019.)	Hasselt	Belgium	Domein Kiewit	None
August 18 (Note: The show on August 18, 2019 in Biddinghuizen was part of Lowlands 2019.)	Biddinghuizen	Netherlands	Evenemententerrein Walibi Holland	None
August 21	New York City	United States	Madison Square Garden	Velvet Negroni
August 22	New York City	United States	Madison Square Garden	Velvet Negroni
August 23	Philadelphia	United States	Mann Center for the Performing Arts	Velvet Negroni
August 24	Washington, D.C.	United States	The Anthem	Velvet Negroni
August 25	Washington, D.C.	United States	The Anthem	Velvet Negroni
October 2	Irving	United States	Toyota Music Factory	Velvet Negroni
October 4 (Note: The show on October 4, 2019 in Austin was part of Austin City Limits 2019.)	Austin	United States	Zilker Park	None
October 5	Houston	United States	White Oak Music Hall	Municipal Waste
October 7	Denver	United States	Mission Ballroom	Altın Gün
October 8	Denver	United States	Mission Ballroom	Altın Gün
October 11 (Note: The show on October 11, 2019 in Austin was part of Austin City Limits 2019.)	Austin	United States	Zilker Park	None

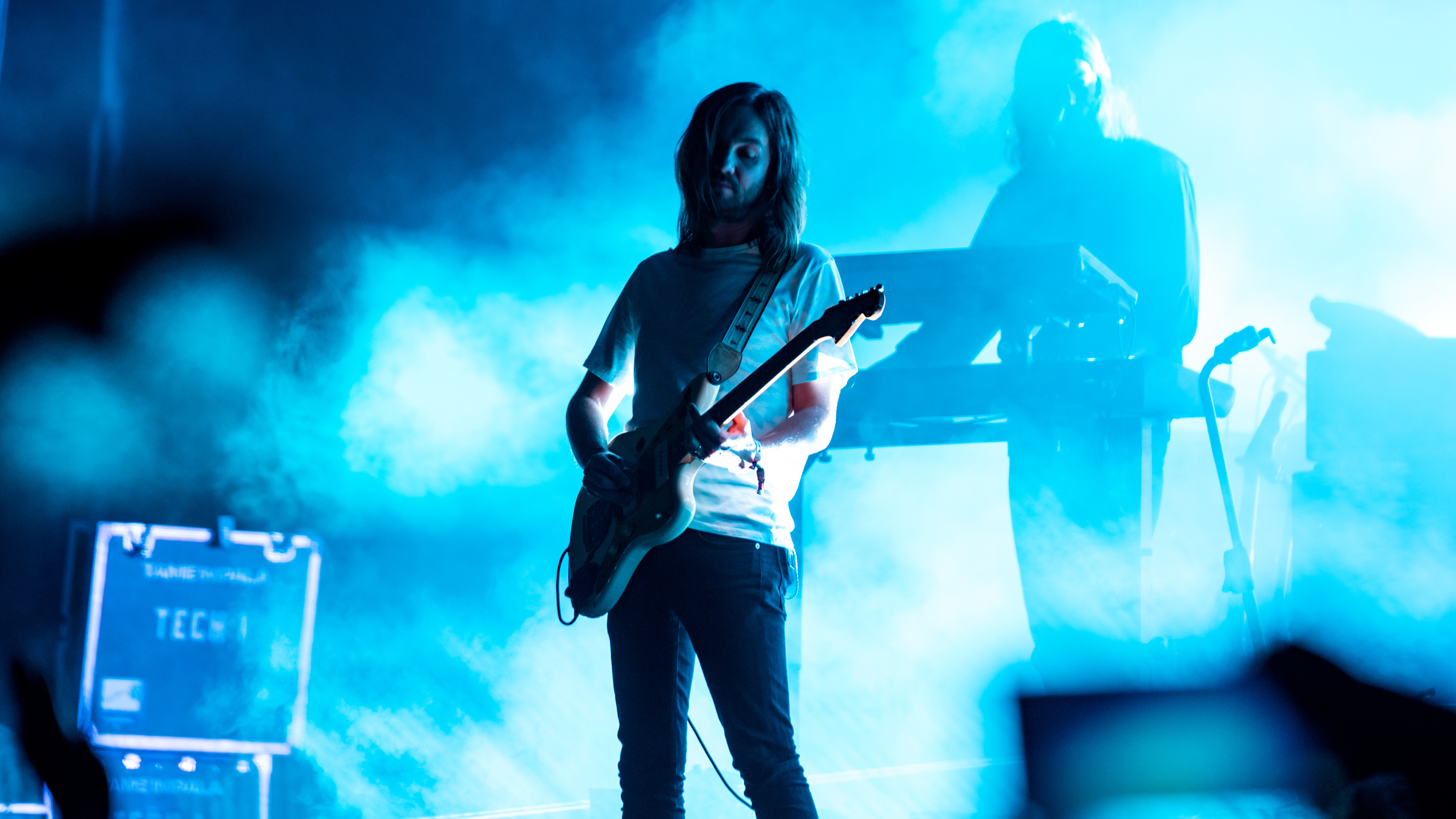
Tame Impala at Primavera Sound 2019

== Setlist ==
This setlist is from the August 23, 2019 concert in Philadelphia. It does not represent all of the concerts for the duration of the tour.

Intro (Note: Includes instrumental snippet of List of People (To Try and Forget About).)

1. "Let It Happen"
2. "Patience"
3. "Led Zeppelin"
4. "The Moment"
5. "Mind Mischief" (Note: Shortened version with Sestri Levante outro.)
6. "Nangs"
7. "Elephant"
8. "Feels Like We Only Go Backwards"
9. "Borderline" (Note: Single Version)
10. "Love/Paranoia"
11. "Yes I'm Changing"
12. "Why Won't You Make Up Your Mind?"
13. "Eventually"
14. "Apocalypse Dreams" (Note: With extended outro.)
  Encore
15. "Gossip" (Note: Extended version, referred to as "Mutant Gossip".)
16. "The Less I Know the Better"
17. "New Person, Same Old Mistakes"

== Live band ==
- Kevin Parker – lead vocals, guitar, occasional synthesiser
- Jay Watson – synthesiser, keyboards, backing vocals
- Dominic Simper – guitar, synthesiser, keyboards
- Julien Barbagallo – drums, percussion, backing vocals
- Cam Avery – bass guitar, synthesiser, backing vocals
- Rafael Lazzaro-Colon – occasional live percussion
- Loren Humphrey – drums (substitute for Julien Barbagallo)
