= Deadbeat Tour =

2025–27 concert tour by Tame Impala

- Tour by Tame Impala
- Promotional image used for North American tour dates in 2026.
- Location: North America; Europe; Australia; Latin America
- Associated album: Deadbeat
- Start date: October 27, 2025
- End date: July 10, 2027
- Legs: 5
- No. of shows: 104
- Guests: Justice; Dua Lipa; Djo; JENNIE; Dominic Fike
- Supporting acts: Fcukers; RIP Magic; Justice; Djo; Dominic Fike; Ninajirachi; Wet Leg

Tame Impala concert chronology
- The Slow Rush Tour (2020–23); Deadbeat Tour (2025–27)

The Deadbeat Tour is a concert tour by Tame Impala, the Australian music project of Kevin Parker, in support of the project's fifth studio album, Deadbeat (2025). The tour started on October 27, 2025, at the Barclays Center in New York City, and will conclude on July 10, 2027 at NOS Alive Festival in Lisbon. Fcukers, RIP Magic, Justice, Djo, Dominic Fike, Ninajirachi, & Wet Leg performed/will perform as the supporting acts.

== Background ==
Tame Impala formally announced Deadbeat on September 4, 2025, following the release of the album's second single, "Loser", the day before. The album was released worldwide on October 17, 2025 through Columbia Records.

On September 5, 2025, dates for shows in the United States were announced for the Deadbeat Tour. The dates spanned from late October 2025 into mid-November. According to Parker, there were originally supposed to be more dates on this leg of the tour. However, after the album was delayed by a month, the tour was also delayed into basketball and hockey season, causing the band to lose dates for multiple venues.

A few weeks later on September 26, 2025, the European leg of the tour was announced for spring 2026.

On February 11, 2026, a video was posted on Tame Impala's Instagram announcing more dates for shows in North America and announcing Djo and Dominic Fike as supporting acts for select shows.

The Australian leg of the tour was announced on February 24, 2026 with Ninajirachi as the supporting act.

On August 24, 2026, Tame Impala announced a 2027 UK and European leg of the Deadbeat Tour including festival dates. On November 11, 2026, it was announced that Tame Impala would be headlining Coachella Music and Arts Festival in 2027 alongside Dua Lipa and SZA. The next day, the first tour dates for Latin America in Mexico were announced.

== Tour dates ==
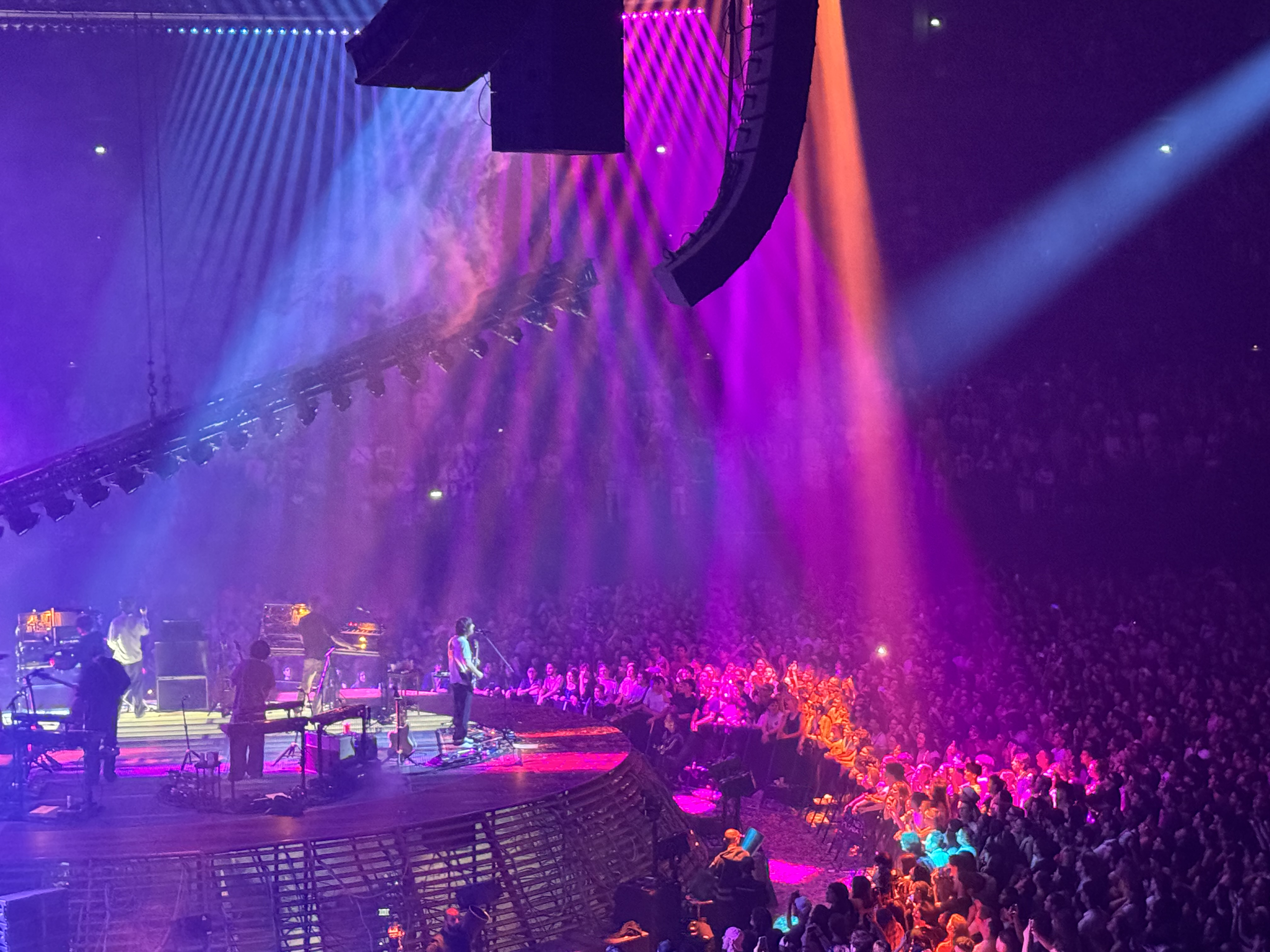
Tame Impala in Lyon on 10 April 2026

List of 2025 concerts, showing date, city, country, venue, opening act and attendance
Date (2025)	City	Country	Venue	Opening Act	Attendance
October 27	Brooklyn	United States	Barclays Center	Fcukers	–
October 28	Brooklyn	United States	Barclays Center	Fcukers	–
October 31	Brooklyn	United States	Barclays Center	Fcukers	–
November 1	Brooklyn	United States	Barclays Center	Fcukers	–
November 3	Chicago	United States	United Center	Fcukers	–
November 6	Austin	United States	Moody Center	Fcukers	16,389
November 9	San Diego	United States	Pechanga Arena	Fcukers	–
November 11	Inglewood (Note: Labelled as Los Angeles in promotional material.)	United States	Kia Forum	Fcukers	–
November 12	Inglewood	United States	Kia Forum	Fcukers	–
November 14	Oakland	United States	Oakland Arena	Fcukers	–
November 15	Oakland	United States	Oakland Arena	Fcukers	–
November 17	Inglewood (Note: Labelled as Los Angeles in promotional material.)	United States	Kia Forum	Fcukers	–

List of 2026 concerts, showing date, city, country, venue and opening acts
Date (2026)	City	Country	Venue	Opening Acts
April 4	Porto	Portugal	Super Bock Arena	RIP Magic
April 5	Lisbon	Portugal	MEO Arena	RIP Magic
April 7	Madrid	Spain	Movistar Arena	RIP Magic
April 8	Barcelona	Spain	Palau Sant Jordi	RIP Magic
April 10	Décines-Charpieu (Note: Labelled as Lyon in promotional material.)	France	LDLC Arena	RIP Magic
April 12	Turin	Italy	Inalpi Arena	RIP Magic
April 13	Casalecchio di Reno (Note: Labelled as Bologna in promotional material.)	Italy	Unipol Arena	RIP Magic
April 14	Zurich	Switzerland	Hallenstadion	RIP Magic
April 16	Munich	Germany	Olympiahalle	RIP Magic
April 18	Gliwice	Poland	PreZero Arena	RIP Magic
April 19	Gliwice	Poland	PreZero Arena	RIP Magic
April 20	Prague	Czech Republic	O2 Arena	RIP Magic
April 23	Hamburg	Germany	Barclays Arena	RIP Magic
April 25	Copenhagen	Denmark	Royal Arena	RIP Magic
April 26	Stockholm	Sweden	Avicii Arena	RIP Magic
April 27	Oslo	Norway	Unity Arena	RIP Magic
April 29	Berlin	Germany	Uber Arena	RIP Magic
April 30	Frankfurt	Germany	Festhalle	RIP Magic
May 1	Düsseldorf	Germany	PSD Bank Dome	RIP Magic
May 3	Paris	France	Accor Arena	Justice
May 4	Amsterdam	Netherlands	Ziggo Dome	RIP Magic
May 5	Antwerp	Belgium	AFAS Dome	RIP Magic
May 7	London	England	The O2 Arena	RIP Magic
May 8	Manchester	England	Co-op Live	RIP Magic
May 9	Birmingham	England	Utilita Arena Birmingham	RIP Magic
May 11	Glasgow	Scotland	OVO Hydro	RIP Magic
May 13	Dublin	Ireland	3Arena	RIP Magic
July 6	Miami	United States	Kaseya Center	Djo
July 7	Miami	United States	Kaseya Center	Djo
July 9	Tampa	United States	Benchmark International Arena	Djo
July 11	Atlanta	United States	State Farm Arena	Djo
July 12	Atlanta	United States	State Farm Arena	Djo
July 15	Philadelphia	United States	Xfinity Mobile Arena	Djo
July 18	Baltimore	United States	CFG Bank Arena	Djo
July 19	Baltimore	United States	CFG Bank Arena	Djo
July 22	Montreal	Canada	Bell Centre	Djo
July 25	Toronto	Canada	Scotiabank Arena	Djo
July 26	Toronto	Canada	Scotiabank Arena	Djo
July 28	Boston	United States	TD Garden	Djo
July 29	Boston	United States	TD Garden	Djo
August 1	Charlotte	United States	Spectrum Center	Djo
August 2	Charlotte	United States	Spectrum Center	Djo
August 4	Nashville	United States	Bridgestone Arena	Djo
August 5	Nashville	United States	Bridgestone Arena	Djo
August 25	Columbus	United States	Nationwide Arena	Dominic Fike
August 28	Minneapolis	United States	Target Center	Dominic Fike
September 1	Seattle	United States	Climate Pledge Arena	Dominic Fike
September 2	Seattle	United States	Climate Pledge Arena	Dominic Fike
September 5	Vancouver	Canada	Rogers Arena	Dominic Fike
September 6	Vancouver	Canada	Rogers Arena	Dominic Fike
September 8	Portland	United States	Moda Center	Dominic Fike
September 11	Denver	United States	Ball Arena	Dominic Fike
September 14	Phoenix	United States	Mortgage Matchup Center	Dominic Fike
September 17	Dallas	United States	American Airlines Center	Dominic Fike
September 19	Houston	United States	Toyota Center	Dominic Fike
September 20	Houston	United States	Toyota Center	Dominic Fike
October 9	Boondall (Note: Labelled as Brisbane in promotional material.)	Australia	Brisbane Entertainment Centre	Ninajirachi
October 10	Boondall	Australia	Brisbane Entertainment Centre	Ninajirachi
October 11	Boondall	Australia	Brisbane Entertainment Centre	Ninajirachi
October 14	Melbourne	Australia	Rod Laver Arena	Ninajirachi
October 15	Melbourne	Australia	Rod Laver Arena	Ninajirachi
October 16	Melbourne	Australia	Rod Laver Arena	Ninajirachi
October 17	Melbourne	Australia	Rod Laver Arena	Ninajirachi
October 19	Sydney	Australia	Afterpay Arena	Ninajirachi
October 20	Sydney	Australia	Afterpay Arena	Ninajirachi
October 21	Sydney	Australia	Afterpay Arena	Ninajirachi
October 24	Perth	Australia	RAC Arena	Ninajirachi
October 25	Perth	Australia	RAC Arena	Ninajirachi

List of 2027 concerts, showing date, city, country, venue and opening act
Date (2027)	City	Country	Venue	Opening Act
February 10	Tulsa	United States	BOK Center	TBA
February 11	Tulsa	United States	BOK Center	TBA
February 16	Monterrey	Mexico	Arena Monterrey	TBA
February 23	Guadalajara	Mexico	Arena VFG	TBA
February 28	Mexico City	Mexico	Palico de los Deportes	TBA
March 1	Mexico City	Mexico	Palico de los Deportes	TBA
April 10 (Note: The show on April 10, 2027 in Indio will be part of Coachella 2027 Weekend 1.)	Indio	United States	Empire Polo Club	None
April 17 (Note: The show on April 17, 2027 in Indio will be part of Coachella 2027 Weekend 2.)	Indio	United States	Empire Polo Club	None
May 28	Manchester	England	Co-op Live	Wet Leg
May 29	Manchester	England	Co-op Live	Wet Leg
June 1	London	England	The O2 Arena	Wet Leg
June 2	London	England	The O2 Arena	Wet Leg
June 3	London	England	The O2 Arena	Wet Leg
June 7	Rotterdam	Netherlands	Rotterdam Ahoy	Wet Leg
June 8	Rotterdam	Netherlands	Rotterdam Ahoy	Wet Leg
June 9	Rotterdam	Netherlands	Rotterdam Ahoy	Wet Leg
June 12	Paris	France	Accor Arena	Wet Leg
June 13	Paris	France	Accor Arena	Wet Leg
June 17	Cologne	Germany	Lanxess Arena	Wet Leg
June 18	Cologne	Germany	Lanxess Arena	Wet Leg
June 19	Cologne	Germany	Lanxess Arena	Wet Leg
June 30 (Note: The show on June 30, 2027 in Gdynia will be part of Open'er Festival 2027.)	Gdynia	Poland	Gdynia-Kosakowo Airport	None
July 2 (Note: The show on July 2, 2027 in Roskilde will be part of Roskilde Festival 2027.)	Roskilde	Denmark	Roskilde Dyreskuplads	None
July 4 (Note: The show on July 4, 2027 in Werchter will be part of Rock Werchter 2027.)	Werchter	Belgium	Werchter Festivalpark	None
July 10 (Note: The show on July 10, 2027 in Algés will be part of NOS Alive 2027.)	Algés	Portugal	Passeio Marítimo de Algés	None

Lead singer Kevin Parker during Tame Impala's performance in Minneapolis on 28 August 2026

== Setlist ==
This setlist is from the November 1, 2025 concert in New York City. It does not represent all of the concerts for the duration of the tour.

1. "Apocalypse Dreams"
2. "The Moment"
3. "Dracula"
4. "Loser"
5. "Breathe Deeper"
6. "Borderline"
7. "Gossip" (Note: Extended version, referred to as "Mutant Gossip".)
8. "Elephant"
9. "Afterthought"
10. "Feels Like We Only Go Backwards"
11. "No Reply" (Note: Instrumental version used to transition from the main stage to the b-stage. Labelled as "No Reply Reprise" on official setlists.)
12. "Ethereal Connection"
13. "Not My World"
14. "Let It Happen"
15. "Nangs"
16. "Obsolete"
17. "Alter Ego"
18. "Yes I'm Changing"
19. "Eventually"
20. "New Person, Same Old Mistakes"
  Encore
21. "My Old Ways"
22. "The Less I Know the Better"
23. "End of Summer"

=== Surprise songs ===
List of 2025 surprise songs, showing date, city, and song
Date (2025)	City	Surprise song(s)
October 27	Brooklyn	"Endors Toi" & "Neverender"
October 28	Brooklyn	"Expectation"
October 31	Brooklyn	"Sundown Syndrome"
November 3	Chicago	"It Is Not Meant to Be"
November 6	Austin	"Endors Toi" & "Expectation"
November 9	San Diego	"Sundown Syndrome"
November 11	Inglewood	"Love/Paranoia"
November 12	Inglewood	"Why Won't You Make Up Your Mind?" & "Neverender"
November 14	Oakland	"No Reply" (Note: Full version of the song.)
November 15	Oakland	"Why Won't They Talk to Me?" & "Half Full Glass of Wine" (Note: Snippet with fan on the drums.)

List of 2026 surprise songs, showing date, city, and song
Date (2026)	City	Surprise song(s)
April 4	Porto	"List of People (To Try and Forget About)"
April 7	Madrid	"Expectation"
April 10	Décines-Charpieu	"Love/Paranoia"
April 10	Casalecchio di Reno	"Why Won't They Talk to Me?"
April 29	Berlin	"Love/Paranoia"
April 30	Frankfurt	"Sundown Syndrome"
May 3	Paris	"Neverender" (Note: With Justice.)
May 5	Antwerp	"Endors Toi"
May 7	London	"Houdini" (Note: With Dua Lipa.)
May 9	Birmingham	"Endors Toi" (Note: Preceded by a "War Pigs" by Black Sabbath tease.) & "Why Won't They Talk to Me?" (Note: Fan request, replaced Expectation.)
May 13	Dublin	"Sundown Syndrome"
July 6	Miami	"List of People (To Try and Forget About)"
July 7	Miami	"Obsolete"
July 9	Tampa	"Alter Ego"
July 11	Atlanta	"Expectation"
July 12	Atlanta	"List of People (To Try and Forget About)"
July 15	Philadelphia	"Alter Ego"
July 18	Baltimore	"List of People (To Try and Forget About)"
July 19	Baltimore	"Expectation"
July 22	Montreal	"Obsolete"
July 25	Toronto	"Alter Ego"
July 26	Toronto	“Posthumous Forgiveness”
July 28	Boston	"List of People (To Try and Forget About)"
July 29	Boston	"Alter Ego"
August 1	Charlotte	"Why Won't They Talk to Me?"
August 2	Charlotte	"Obsolete"
August 4	Nashville	"Expectation"
August 5	Nashville	"List of People (To Try and Forget About)"
August 25	Columbus	"Alter Ego"
August 28	Minneapolis	"Sundown Syndrome"
September 1	Seattle	"It Is Not Meant to Be"
September 2	Seattle	"Expectation"
September 5	Vancouver	"List of People (To Try and Forget About)"
September 6	Vancouver	"Love/Paranoia"
September 8	Portland	"Why Won't They Talk to Me?"
September 11	Denver	"Alter Ego"
September 14	Phoenix	"Expectation"
September 17	Dallas	"List of People (To Try and Forget About)"
September 19	Houston	"Love/Paranoia"
September 20	Houston	"Why Won't They Talk to Me?"
October 9	Boondall	"List of People (To Try and Forget About)"
October 10	Boondall	"Alter Ego"
October 11	Boondall	"Sundown Syndrome"
October 14	Melbourne	"Expectation"
October 15	Melbourne	"List of People (To Try and Forget About)"
October 16	Melbourne	"Why Won't They Talk to Me?"
October 17	Melbourne	"Alter Ego"
October 19	Sydney	"Love/Paranoia"
October 20	Sydney	"List of People (To Try and Forget About)"
October 21	Sydney	"Alter Ego"
October 24	Perth	“Posthumous Forgiveness”
October 25	Perth	"List of People (To Try and Forget About)"

==== Notes ====
- The first show in New York was the first show with James Ireland as a member of the live band.
- Beginning at the second show in New York, "The Moment" and "Yes I'm Changing" (Note: "Yes I'm Changing" rotates in and out with "Piece of Heaven".) would rotate in and out of the setlist.
- At the Halloween show in New York City, the live members of Tame Impala all dressed up as Kevin Parker and walked out to "Half Full Glass of Wine". Eric Andre appeared during "No Reply".
- At the Halloween show in New York City, "Sundown Syndrome" was played for the first time since 2018.
- At the start of the encore at the second show in Oakland, Kevin Parker invited a fan to play the drums of "Half Full Glass of Wine" on stage.
- Beginning at the show in Porto, "The Moment" would become a permanent addition to the European setlist and "List of People (To Try and Forget About)" would begin to alternate with "Obsolete". This would also be the live debut of "List of People (To Try and Forget About)".
- Starting with the show in Madrid, "Expectation" would occasionally alternate with "Alter Ego".
- In Paris, Kevin Parker revealed that he wrote "Yes I'm Changing" when he was on tour in Paris for Lonerism.
- At the show in Paris, "Neverender" was played with Justice.
- In London, Kevin brought out Dua Lipa at the end of "Afterthought" and proceeded to perform "Houdini".
- In Birmingham, "Why Won't They Talk To Me?" was played upon fan request, replacing "Expectation".
- At the show in Birmingham, Kevin Parker instructed fans to wish live drummer Julian Barbagallo happy birthday.
- Beginning at the first show in Miami, a new song called "Deadbeat Jam" would be played after "Apocalypse Dreams".
- At the first show in Boston, Joe Keery (Djo) was brought out during “Loser”. Afterwards, Tame Impala performed an old jam known as “Mind Melt” for the first time since the 2019 World Tour.
- At the second show in Boston, Kevin brought out Jennie to perform "Dracula" together.
- At the first show in Nashville, Spider-Man appeared during "No Reply".
- At the show in Columbus, Tame Impala paid tribute to Dolly Parton. Before "My Old Ways", Parker also performed a little bit of "Jolene" before stopping.
- At the first show in Perth, Fremantle Dockers player Andrew Brayshaw appeared during "No Reply".

== Live band ==
- Kevin Parker – lead vocals, guitar, occasional synthesizer
- Dominic Simper – guitar, synthesizer, keyboards
- Jay Watson – synthesizer, keyboards, guitar, backing vocals
- Julien Barbagallo – drums, percussion, backing vocals, synthesizer
- Cam Avery – bass guitar, synthesizer, backing vocals
- James Ireland – guitar, synthesizer, percussion, drums

== Commercial performance ==
In New York City, all four nights were sold-out. In Austin, the tour set a new record for most tickets ever sold at the Moody Center, making the show the venue's largest concert to date.
