= Breathe Deeper =

- Lil Yachty remix cover

Single by Tame Impala

from the album The Slow Rush
- Released: 14 February 2020
- Genre: Deep house; R&B; psychedelia
- Length: 6:13; 4:48 (Lil Yachty remix)
- Label: Modular Recordings
- Songwriter: Kevin Parker
- Producer: Kevin Parker

Tame Impala singles chronology
"Lost in Yesterday" (2020)	"Breathe Deeper" (2020)	"Is It True" (2020)

Music video
- "Breathe Deeper" on YouTube

"Breathe Deeper" is a song by Australian music project Tame Impala, released as the fifth single from their fourth studio album The Slow Rush (2020).

The song was remixed by Lil Yachty for the deluxe edition of the album called The Slow Rush – B-Sides and Remixes.

The United Kingdom based Butt Studio directed the music video for "Breathe Deeper", which was released on 15 December 2020. Tame Impala performed the song on Jimmy Kimmel Live! and included it in the set list of the Slow Rush Tour between 2020 and 2021.

== Background and composition ==
"Breathe Deeper" is a deep house, R&B and psychedelia track in which Kevin Parker sings about staying calm in stressful situations. Parker himself has stated it was inspired by an experience he had with ecstasy.

== Release and promotion ==
The track was released through Modular Recordings on 14 February 2020, as the fifth single from the project's fourth studio album, The Slow Rush (2020). It served as a follow-up to the singles "Borderline", "It Might Be Time", "Posthumous Forgiveness", and "Lost In Yesterday". On 2 March 2020, Tame Impala debuted "Breathe Deeper" on Jimmy Kimmel Live!, alongside a performance of other album track, "Lost In Yesterday". The track was added to the set list of the project's Slow Rush Tour, which was then delayed due to the COVID-19 pandemic and resumed in the following year. In December 2020, Kevin Parker performed the song on Australia’s Triple J Radio, along with a cover of Edwyn Collins’ 1994 hit, “A Girl Like You”. A music video directed by the UK based Butt Studio was released on 15 December 2020, and features life from the eyes of a dragonfly.

== Remix ==
On 6 October 2021, a remix of the track by American rapper Lil Yachty was released to promote the deluxe edition of The Slow Rush.. Lil Yachty stated on the remix that "It was so amazing to work with Kevin [Parker] as I've been a big fan since high school so it was a pleasant surprise and honor to be a part of such an incredible song."

== Reception ==
In a review for The Slow Rush, Tim Sendra called it a "kind of languorous twilight groove". PopMatters Jacob Uitti opined that it "would be a top pick for any breakdancer. It’s rigid in the best of ways, popping and locking like a subway artisan on a big square of well-worn cardboard. But it also provides, yes, a deep breath after the very personal song preceding it. Its melody is like a melty pink marshmallow." The Line of Best Fit critic Christopher Hamilton-Peach noted it "basks in '90s house piano chords". Jason Anderson believed that it "is propelled by Frankie Knuckles-style piano figures, stuffed with swirling synths and topped with Parker’s most exuberant vocal performance" Sam Moore placed it at number 29 in a ranking of every Tame Impala song in 2020, stating that "Expressive percussion and a slinking bassline lead the way on this sleek R&B ‘Slow Rush’ cut before a bright, up-tempo piano line takes control." Pitchfork placed it at number 86 in their ranking of the 100 best songs of 2020, stating that "you can hear Mariah Carey in the syrupy verse, the Neptunes in every raw drum hit, early Daft Punk in the finale’s acid house groove, and yet there’s no mistaking this for anything but a Tame Impala song."

== Charts ==
Chart (2020)	Peak position
Australia (ARIA)	55
Ireland (IRMA)	51
Lithuania (AGATA)	84
New Zealand Hot Singles (RMNZ)	9
Portugal (AFP)	95
UK Singles (Official Charts)	55
US Hot Rock & Alternative Songs (Billboard)	2

== Certifications and sales ==
Region	Certification	Certified units/sales
Australia (ARIA)	Gold	35,000^{‡}
New Zealand (RMNZ)	Gold	15,000^{‡}
United States (RIAA)	Gold	500,000^{‡}
^{‡} Sales+streaming figures based on certification alone.
