= Bar Mediterraneo =

Studio album by Nu Genea
- Released: 13 May 2022
- Genres: Funk, fusion
- Length: 34:58
- Languages: Italian, Neapolitan, French, Tunisian arabic
- Labels: NG Records, Carosello Records

Nu Genea chronology
Nuova Napoli (2018)	Bar Mediterraneo (2022)	People of the Moon (2026)

Bar Mediterraneo is the third studio album by Italian musical duo Nu Genea, the first under their new name after they changed it from Nu Guinea to Nu Genea. It was published on 13 May 2022 through Carosello Records. The album features appearances from other artists such as Marzouk Mejri in Gelbi, Célia Kameni in Marechià, Tony Allen in Straniero and Marco Castello in Rire.

== Composition ==
Interviewed by Rockit.it, the duo said that the title refers to "an imaginary bar in which a foreigner is welcomed and becomes an essential part of the bar itself, enriching everyone." The imaginary bar becomes thus a place where cultures meet and blend together, and this fusion of cultures and their sounds, languages and instruments is exactly the content of the album. In Bar Mediterraneo music from all over the Mediterranean blend together in the setting that is Naples: the city's culture is in fact the result of the encounter of many of these cultures, just like its language, which is the predominant one in the album.

== Track listing ==
Bar Mediterraneo track listing
No.	Title	Length
1.	"Bar Mediterraneo"	3:04
2.	"Tienaté"	4:40
3.	"Gelbi"	3:54
4.	"Marechià"	4:25
5.	"Straniero"	2:58
6.	"Praja Magia"	3:20
7.	"Vesuvio"	4:41
8.	"Rire"	4:23
9.	"La Crisi"	3:36
Total length:		34:58
