= Lost in Yesterday =

2020 single by Tame Impala

Single by Tame Impala

from the album The Slow Rush
- Released: 8 January 2020
- Length: 4:09
- Label: Modular
- Songwriter: Kevin Parker
- Producer: Kevin Parker

Tame Impala singles chronology
"Posthumous Forgiveness" (2019)	"Lost in Yesterday" (2020)	"Breathe Deeper" (2020)

Music video
- "Lost in Yesterday" on YouTube

"Lost in Yesterday" is a song by Tame Impala, the musical project of the Australian multi-instrumentalist Kevin Parker. It was released through Modular Recordings on 8 January 2020, as the fourth single from the project's fourth studio album, The Slow Rush (2020). Parker wrote and produced it, and also performed all the instruments and vocals. The song has disco, dub, and funk elements, it predominantly contains a groovy bassline. Lyrically, the song deals with nostalgia and the passage of time, centering on Parker's complicated relationship with these topics.

The duo Terri Timely, composed of Ian Kibbey and Corey Creasey, directed the music video for "Lost in Yesterday", which was released on 30 January 2020. It has a single shot style and depicts Parker as a band's lead vocalist in a 1970s retro wedding. Tame Impala performed the song on Jimmy Kimmel Live! and included it in the set list of the Slow Rush Tour between 2020 and 2021.

The song was ranked fifth on the Australian Triple J Hottest 100 of 2020 poll, and was nominated for Song of the Year and Most Performed Alternate Work at the APRA Music Awards of 2021. Commercially, "Lost in Yesterday" reached middle-low positions on the main national charts of Australia, Ireland, Lithuania, Portugal, and the United Kingdom. It received certifications in Australia, New Zealand, the United Kingdom, and the United States.

== Release and promotion ==
Tame Impala, Kevin Parker's musical project, first teased a then-upcoming song in the first days of 2020. "Lost in Yesterday" was released through Modular Recordings on 8 January 2020, as the fourth single from the project's fourth studio album, The Slow Rush (2020). It served as a follow-up to the singles "Borderline", "It Might Be Time", and "Posthumous Forgiveness", all released in 2019. On 2 March 2020, Tame Impala debuted "Lost In Yesterday" on Jimmy Kimmel Live!, alongside a performance of other album track, "Breathe Deeper". The track was added to the set list of the project's fourth concert tour, the Slow Rush Tour, which was then delayed due to the COVID-19 pandemic and resumed in the following year.

== Composition ==
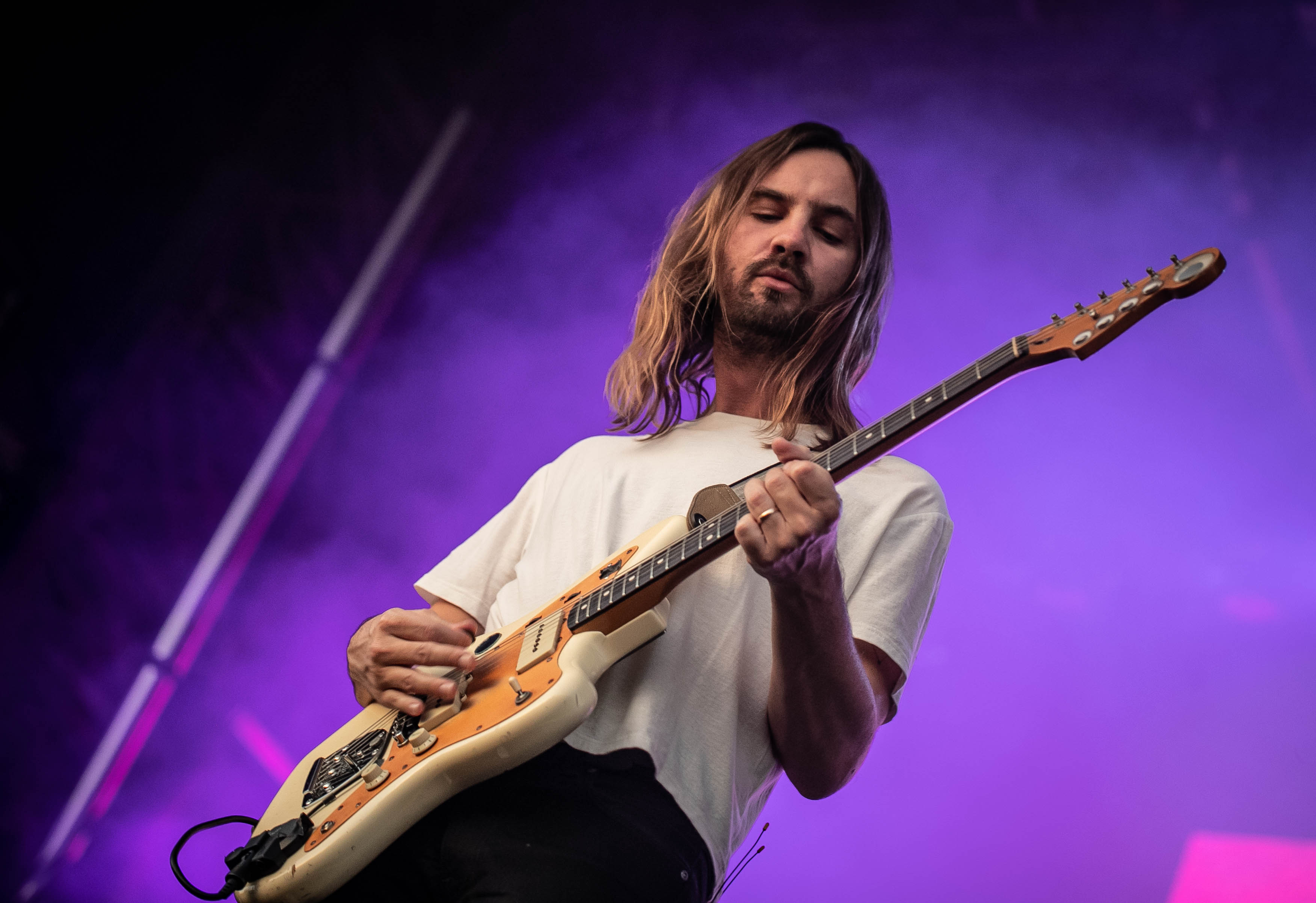
Kevin Parker was in charge of the song's writing, recording, and production.

Parker wrote, recorded, and produced The Slow Rush, including "Lost in Yesterday". Musically, it has elements of disco, funk, and dub effects. The song contains a "groovy" bassline, compared by Stereogum's Chris Deville to Tame Impala's 2015 single "The Less I Know the Better". Pitchfork's Jill Mapes perceived similarities between the vocals of Parker and Daft Punk.

The lyrical content of the song sees Parker reflecting on past memories and how they change with time: "Now even though that was a time I hated from day one / Eventually terrible memories turn into great ones". It also deals with nostalgia and Parker's complicated relationship with it. Parker recalls the days when he was making music with friends in Perth ("When we were living in squalor, wasn't it heaven? / Back when we used to get on it four out of seven"). On a press release, Tame Impala described the song as "an examination of time's distorting effect on memories". The song shares its concept with several other tracks on the album, which Parker described as an "idea of time passing, of seeing your life flash before your eyes, being able to see clearly your life from this point onwards".

== Reception ==
Christopher Roberts of Under the Radar named "Lost in Yesterday" as one of the best songs of its release week, and Deville opined that it is one of the best The Slow Rush singles. Al Newstead of the Australian Broadcasting Corporation said that it is "more accessible" than the project's previous singles and compared it to "Patience" (2019) and Currents' "The Moment" (2015). In a less positive review, Mapes believed that the song "tries to edge up an aggressively beachy vibe [...] and ends up feeling a little dated". It was nominated for Song of the Year and Most Performed Alternate Work at the APRA Music Awards of 2021. The song was voted into fifth place on the Australian Triple J Hottest 100 of 2020, which was broadcast on 23 January 2021.

Commercially, "Lost in Yesterday" appeared on five main national charts. It peaked at number 65 in Australia, 78 in Ireland, 80 in Lithuania, 89 in the United Kingdom, and 129 in Portugal. It additionally reached the Canada Rock chart at number 23, and the Ultratip Bubbling Under charts in the Flanders and Wallonia regions of Belgium at number 4 and 22, respectively. In the United States, the single reached number one on Billboard's Adult Alternative Songs chart, becoming Tame Impala's first song to top an airplay chart in the United States. It also reached number two on Rock Airplay and five on the Hot Rock & Alternative Songs chart, and the year-end rankings of both charts. "Lost in Yesterday" received gold certifications by the Australian Recording Industry Association (ARIA), Recording Industry Association of America (RIAA), and Recorded Music NZ (RMNZ), as well as a silver certification by the British Phonographic Industry (BPI).

== Music video ==
The duo Terri Timely, composed of Ian Kibbey and Corey Creasey, directed the four-minute music video for "Lost in Yesterday", which was released on 30 January 2020. It stars Parker as the lead vocalist of a band in a retro wedding, singing along to the song, through various dimensions. The video shows a scene representing the passage of time, following fashion trends. With a single shot and 1970s style, the camera moves several times through the event's venue, showing the guests becoming more positive as the video progresses. It depicts the attendees dancing on the dance floor as well as the bride and groom cutting a cake, and her mother smoking a cigarette. At the end of the video, the main characters from previous versions reappear to ruin the event. Jordan Darville for The Fader called the video "impressive" and "detailed". NME's Charlotte Krol described it as a "nightmare Groundhog Day", which is mentioned in the song's lyrics ("You've been diggin' it up like Groundhog Day").

== Charts ==
=== Weekly charts ===
Chart (2020)	Peak position
Australia (ARIA)	65
Belgium (Ultratip Bubbling Under Flanders)	4
Belgium (Ultratip Bubbling Under Wallonia)	22
Canada Rock (Billboard)	23
Ireland (IRMA)	78
Lithuania (AGATA)	80
Netherlands (Single Tip)	26
Portugal (AFP)	129
UK Singles (Official Charts)	89
US Hot Rock & Alternative Songs (Billboard)	5
US Rock & Alternative Airplay (Billboard)	2

=== Year-end charts ===
Chart (2020)	Position
US Hot Rock & Alternative Songs (Billboard)	22
US Rock Airplay (Billboard)	9

== Certifications ==
Region	Certification	Certified units/sales
Australia (ARIA)	Gold	35,000^{‡}
New Zealand (RMNZ)	Gold	15,000^{‡}
United Kingdom (BPI)	Silver	200,000^{‡}
United States (RIAA)	Gold	500,000^{‡}
^{‡} Sales+streaming figures based on certification alone.
