= Nu Genea =

Italian musical duo

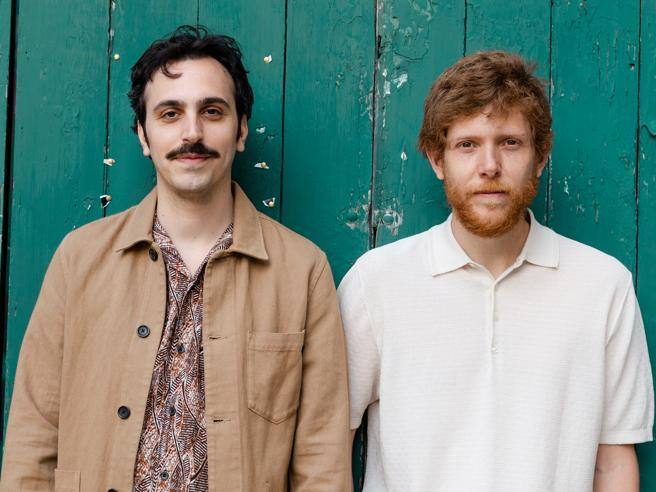
- Nu Genea in 2022. On the left, Massimo di Lena, on the right Lucio Aquilina.

Background information
- Origin: Naples, Campania, Italy
- Genres: Electronic; Jazz-funk; Fusion; Disco
- Years active: 2014–present
- Labels: NG Records; Comet Records; Early Sounds Recordings; Tartelet Records; Carosello Records

Nu Genea, formerly Nu Guinea, are an Italian musical duo formed in 2014 consisting of musicians Massimo Di Lena and Lucio Aquilina.

== History ==
=== 2014–2020: Nu Guinea ===
The duo was formed as Nu Guinea in 2014 by Massimo Di Lena and Lucio Aquilina, two Neapolitans who lived in Berlin, the capital city of Germany. In the same year, they released their first EP, called Nu Guinea.

In 2015, they worked with Nigerian drummer Tony Allen, with whom they then published on 15 February 2015 another album: The Tony Allen Experiments.

In 2018, wanting to celebrate and pay a tribute to their hometown, Naples, they published via their own label NG Records a new LP: Nuova Napoli. The album, a fusion of electronic music, sounds, with vocals in the neapolitan language and acoustic instruments, was very well received by critics. The success of the album was followed by a national and international tour that took the duo many places around the globe, such as France, particularly Paris, Russia, in Moscow, Brazil, Australia, the Netherlands, to name a few.

Alongside with DNApoli and Famiglia Diocristiana, Nu Guinea participated in the creation of a vinyl collection called Napoli Segreta (in English Secret Naples), which had the goal of saving and republishing the music produced in Naples during the '70s and '80s. The collection was followed by Napoli Segreta vol.2, published in 2020.

=== 2021–present ===
In 2021, the duo made a communication on Instagram regarding the change of their duo's name from Nu Guinea to Nu Genea, explaining their decisions with this message:

"With reference to the Greek word "γενέα" (genéa), which means "birth," Nu Genea means a new birth in our consciousness, as well as a name that reflects more directly the concept of our music, which is mixing styles and sounds, that throughout history have touched the Gulf of Naples, and give them a new birth. This slight variation of letters has considerably changed the meaning and reconciles us to the primary goal that our music wants to reach."

In the same year, they collaborated with French singer Celia Kameni and published the single Marechià and signed a contract with the label Carosello Records.

On 5 May 2022, the duo started an international tour across Italian and European festivals. On 13 May 2022, they published the album Bar Mediterraneo under NG Records licensed by Carosello Records.

In Spring 2026, the group released a new album titled, "People of the Moon," taking a different direction from previous work and incorporating many different languages.

== Discography ==
=== As Nu Guinea ===
==== Album ====
- 2016 – The Tony Allen Experiments (Comet Records)
- 2018 – Nuova Napoli (NG Records)

==== EPs ====
- 2014 – Nu Guinea (Early Sounds Records)
- 2015 – World EP (Tartelet Records)

==== Singles ====
- 2017 – Amore (NG Records)

=== As Nu Genea ===
==== Album ====
- 2022 – Bar Mediterraneo (NG Records licensed by Carosello Records)
- 2026 – People of the Moon (NG Records)

==== Singles ====
- 2022 – Marechià (NG Records) with Célia Kameni
- 2022 – Tienatè (NG Records) with vocals by Fabiana Martone
- 2025 – Sciallà (NG Records) with vocals by Fabiana Martone
