= Is It True (Tame Impala song) =

Single by Tame Impala

from the album The Slow Rush
- Released: 7 August 2020
- Genre: Disco; psychedelic rock; boogie; funk
- Length: 3:58; 5:23 (Four Tet remix)
- Label: Modular Recordings
- Songwriter: Kevin Parker
- Producer: Kevin Parker

Tame Impala singles chronology
"Breathe Deeper" (2020)	"Is It True" (2020)	"No Choice" (2021)

Music video
- "Is It True" on YouTube

"Is It True" is a 2020 single by Australian psychedelic project Tame Impala and the sixth and final single released in promotion of their fourth studio album, The Slow Rush. While it was initially released on February 14, 2020, as the ninth track on the album, a standalone single was released on August 7, 2020.

The song was remixed by Four Tet for the deluxe edition of the album called The Slow Rush – B-Sides and Remixes. A visualizer would be made for the remix in a similar style to the lyric video.

The song peaked at number 15 on the US Rock Airplay chart and number 10 on US Hot Rock & Alternative Songs chart in Billboard magazine.

== Promotion ==
Tame Impala performed the song live on The Late Show with Stephen Colbert during COVID lockdown, where on the video of the performance he "cloned himself".

== Composition ==
The song has been described as a disco track and a boogie track. The song has also been noted for being one of the more fun and happy tracks on the record featuring progressive and Vegas Strip-esque synthesizer work. The song has also been described as being a Pharrell Williams-like track.

== Lyric video ==
The lyric video was released on August 6, 2020 and features Kevin Parker singing the track over trippy & psychedelic visuals. The music video has been described as being reminiscent of Tame Impala's live shows as it also features visuals used in previous live shows. The music video also looks like it is being played on VHS tape with an "old-school TV Screen". The lyrics appear on the video in all white hue at the bottom of the screen.

== Track listing ==
1. "Is It True (Four Tet Remix)" – 5:25
2. "Is It True" – 3:58

== Charts ==
Chart (2020)	Peak position
Belgium (Flemish Ultratip Charts Flanders)	7
Canada Rock (Billboard)	27
US Adult Alternative Airplay (Billboard)	1
US Hot Rock & Alternative Songs (Billboard)	10
US Rock & Alternative Airplay (Billboard)	15

== Certifications ==
Certifications for "Is It True"
Region	Certification	Certified units/sales
Australia (ARIA)	Platinum	70,000^{‡}
New Zealand (RMNZ)	Gold	15,000^{‡}
^{‡} Sales+streaming figures based on certification alone.
