= The Slow Rush =

Studio album by Tame Impala
- Released: 14 February 2020
- Studios: Kevin Parker's home studio, Fremantle, Western Australia; Studios in Los Angeles
- Genres: Psychedelic pop; disco; progressive pop; soft rock; electronic; electropop
- Length: 57:16
- Labels: Modular; Island Australia; Interscope; Fiction; Caroline
- Producer: Kevin Parker

Tame Impala chronology
Currents (2015)	The Slow Rush (2020)	Deadbeat (2025)

Singles from The Slow Rush
- 1. "Borderline" Released: 12 April 2019; 2. "It Might Be Time" Released: 28 October 2019; 3. "Posthumous Forgiveness" Released: 3 December 2019; 4. "Lost in Yesterday" Released: 8 January 2020; 5. "Breathe Deeper" Released: 14 February 2020; 6. "Is It True" Released: 7 August 2020

The Slow Rush is the fourth studio album by Tame Impala, the musical project of Australian multi-instrumentalist Kevin Parker. It was released on 14 February 2020. It follows the 2015 album Currents and the 2019 singles "Patience" and "Borderline", with the latter serving as the first single from the album. Rooted in psychedelic disco music, The Slow Rush received positive reviews from music critics. On the top 10 on many record charts around the world, it debuted atop the charts in three countries and on the US Alternative and Rock charts.

At the 2020 ARIA Music Awards, the album won five categories, Album of the Year, Best Group, Best Rock Album, Engineer of the Year and Producer of the Year (the latter two for work by Parker). The album also received a nomination for Best Alternative Music Album at the 63rd Annual Grammy Awards, whilst "Lost In Yesterday" was nominated for Best Rock Song.

Two years after the album's release, a deluxe box set edition was released in February 2022, comprising b-sides and remixes of the album's tracks. This version features remixes from Four Tet and Blood Orange, among others, and a guest appearance from rapper Lil Yachty.

== Background ==
Kevin Parker said that his biggest takeaway from making both the previous Tame Impala album, 2015's Currents, and The Slow Rush was to trust his gut instincts. "I don't want to labor over music. More and more, that's becoming a quality of music that I'm allergic to."

In an interview with Billboard, Parker said he was inspired by the career trajectory of "super-producer" Max Martin and that he wants to gradually break into the world of pop music. In an interview with Uproxx, it was also revealed that one goal for The Slow Rush was to "try and use things from totally different worlds in the way that a hip hop producer would. To be almost collage-y."

== Writing and recording ==
While writing songs for the album in 2018 in Los Angeles, California, Parker had to flee a house in Malibu that he had rented on Airbnb due to widespread wildfires. Parker escaped with only his laptop, a hard drive, and his 1960s vintage Höfner bass; the remainder of his equipment at the house was destroyed.

After releasing the singles "Patience" and "Borderline"—the former only appearing on the bonus track edition, the latter included on the tracklist in remixed form—in March and April 2019, the album's release was delayed. These two songs were first performed live on Saturday Night Live on 28 March 2019 and received commercial praise.

In July 2019, Parker said: "Part of the thing about me starting an album is that I have to feel kind of worthless again to want to make music". In October 2019, a video appeared on the band's website, and on 25 October, the video was extended to announce the title of the album and release year. The video features Parker in the recording studio as well as snippets of unreleased music, which would later be included on the album as segments of the track "Tomorrow's Dust".

"Borderline" was altered/remastered following a November 2019 listening party. On 18 December 2019, Parker revealed in an interview with Annie Mac on BBC Radio 1's Future Sounds show that this new version of "Borderline" would appear on The Slow Rush instead, jokingly referring to the single release as the "old 'Borderline'" upon the release of the album.

== Composition ==
NME writes: "This is a 57-minute flex of every musical muscle in Parker's body. Crunchy guitars are largely absent, but we're left with something far more intriguing – a pop record bearing masterful electronic strokes. If Currents soundtracked the glorious come-up, The Slow Rush is the wobbly morning after, with everything and everyone under question."

The Slow Rush was called "an extraordinarily detailed opus" that reaches into "specific corners of the past six decades": Philly soul, early prog, acid house, adult contemporary-R&B, and even Late Registration. Noted as more upbeat than Tame Impala's previous records, the album has touches of '90s English techno and soft rock. NPR noted: "Listen closely and you can pick up traces of Rick James, Paul McCartney and Wings, Ravel, Childish Gambino, Pink Floyd, Human League, Prince and on and on. [...] The post-psychedelic swirl of The Slow Rush registers as an organic blend, with the songs never feeling cluttered or too tightly scripted." Parallels with James Blake's Assume Form (2019) were observed as well.

=== Songs ===
The tone of the album is established on the "moody" space pop opening track "One More Year", called "Parker's most intimate song to date", featuring a steady beat, glitchy loops, a robotic chorus, and a tremolo effect. "Instant Destiny" begins with a falsetto-led melody and features xylophones, while "Borderline" has "mournful keyboards" and a disco groove. The funky/riffy and Jimmy Page-like "Breathe Deeper" "flits" between ravey pianos and '80s Fleetwood Mac – "with a touch of Daft Punk's 'Da Funk' thrown in the song's final 90 seconds". It is a '70s/'90s R&B crossover with an "ascendant" piano line.

"Tomorrow's Dust" is an early-'70s "soul-cruiser". A "bittersweet keyboard" in the semi-ballad "On Track" was said to resemble Daryl Hall. The "festival-ready" "Lost in Yesterday" has a beachy vibe, dub effects, and an '80s bassline. "Is It True" has a "boogie" sound. The Ironside-esque siren that lends panic in "It Might Be Time" recalls Quincy Jones. The two-minute "Glimmer" is house-y and mostly an instrumental. "One More Hour" is bare and "drowning in echo", full of fluttering strings and an "apocalyptic, heavily phased guitar, then another gnarly riff, crashing drums, and Moog synths firing in all directions."

=== Lyrics ===
The overarching theme of The Slow Rush was said to be "the passage of time". Many of the tunes on The Slow Rush have a "multi-level dimensionality": the melodies "dwell in a sweet, idyllic late-afternoon mood" that can veil the "internal turbulence, doubt and emotional complexity lurking in the words".

On "One More Year", Parker ponders about his connection to the places outside his studio, and outside his own head: "Do you remember we were standing here a year ago / Our minds were racing and time went slow / If there was trouble in the world we didn't know / If we had a care it didn't show". "Instant Destiny" is "a swirling start-stop of a victory lap where he threatens to do something crazy, like buy a house in Miami." The second half of single "Posthumous Forgiveness", a "reckoning" with Parker's deceased father, is a "cathartic rumination" on their tricky relationship and Parker's superstardom: "Wanna tell you 'bout the time / I was in Abbey Road / Or the time that I had / Mick Jagger on the phone".

Parker reflects on the power of nostalgia ("Lost in Yesterday") and the fear of losing his mojo ("It Might Be Time"), while the spindly "Tomorrow's Dust" is a "slap round the face" in the favour of progress: "There's no use tryin' to relate to that older soul". Closer "One More Hour" concludes Parker's journey as an "introvert searching for inner peace": "As long as I can, as long as I can spend some time alone." He later employs a taunting, provocative tone in the song "heard on playgrounds everywhere": "Whatever I've done, I did it for love. I did it for fun. I did it for fame."

== Packaging ==
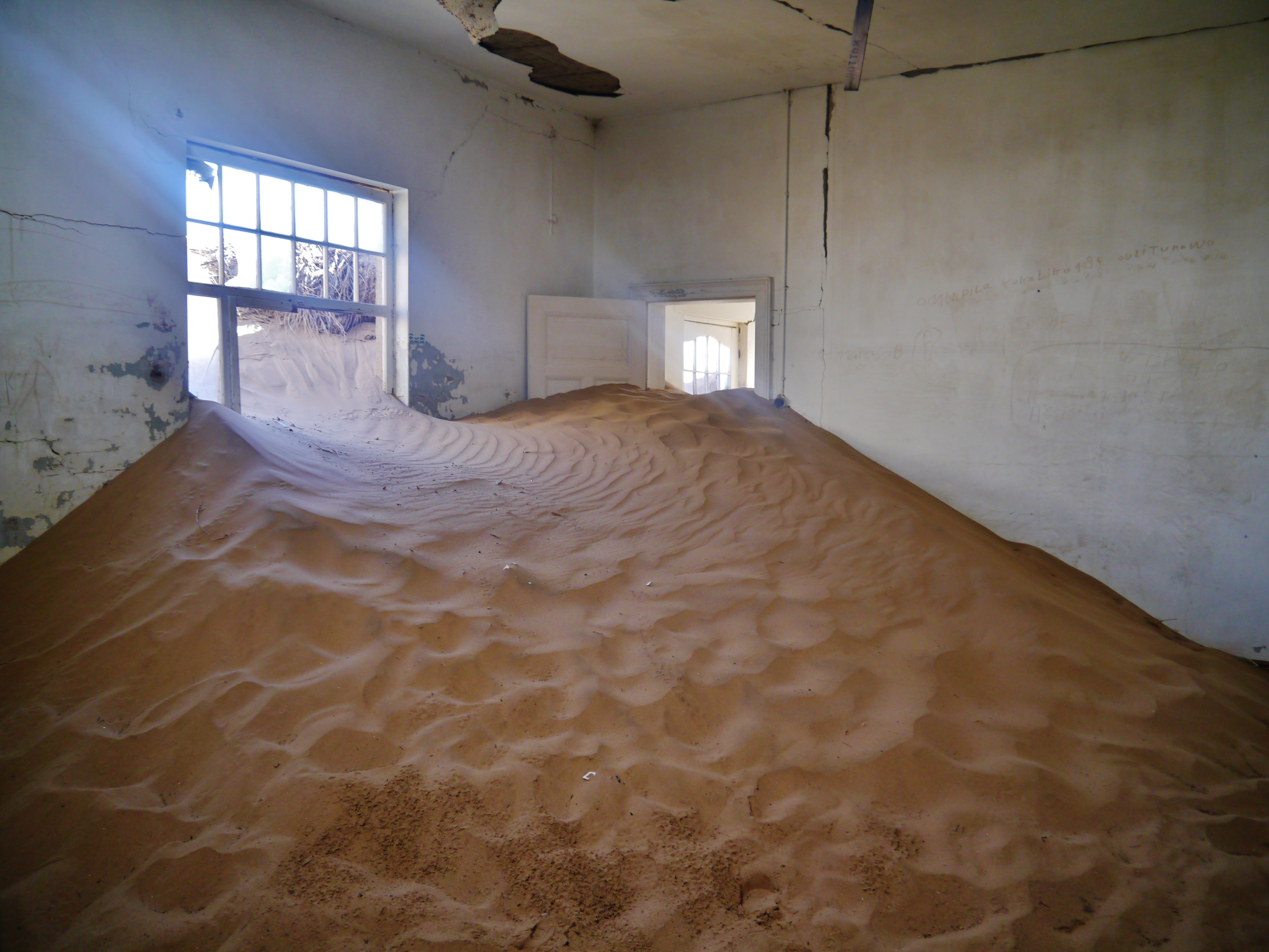
The room of the abandoned building in Kolmanskop in which the cover art was photographed (pictured in 2017)

The album cover, along with the covers for the album's singles (such as "Posthumous Forgiveness", "Lost in Yesterday", and "It Might Be Time"), feature photos taken in abandoned buildings in the ghost town of Kolmanskop, Namibia, with digital alterations to add vibrant colours to the interiors. Photographed by Neil Krug, the images were intended to be mystical and psychedelic to match the musical style of Tame Impala.

== Critical reception ==
Professional ratings
Aggregate scores
Source	Rating
AnyDecentMusic?	7.6/10
Metacritic	79/100
Review scores
Source	Rating
AllMusic	4.5/5 stars
The A.V. Club	C+
The Daily Telegraph	4/5 stars
Exclaim!	6/10
The Guardian	4/5 stars
The Independent	4/5 stars
NME	4/5 stars
Pitchfork	8.0/10
Q	4/5 stars
Rolling Stone	3.5/5 stars

The Slow Rush received generally positive reviews from listeners and music critics. At Metacritic, which assigns a normalised rating out of 100 to reviews from mainstream publications, the album received an average score of 79, based on 30 reviews. Aggregator AnyDecentMusic? gave it 7.6 out of 10, based on their assessment of the critical consensus.

Jillian Mapes of Pitchfork wrote that "The Slow Rush is an extraordinarily detailed opus whose influences reach into specific corners of the past six decades." NPR writer Tom Moon added: "While everybody else in the catchy-song business seems to be running in circles, [Parker's] out there unapologetically having fun, creating new delivery systems for his own exotic brand of sonic euphoria."

Zack Ruskin from Variety was also positive: "The Slow Rush is arguably Parker's most fully realized and satisfying effort to date. While lyrically, the album seems a bit escapist, Parker likes to operate somewhere in the middle, dabbling in the personal but often only as a piece of a larger meditation." Ruskin later finished with, "The Slow Rush proves that Parker has earned all the time he needs."

In a year-end assessment, Vincent Arrieta of the Dallas Observer pointed out the timeliness of the themes of The Slow Rush in the wake of the COVID-19 pandemic, saying "The Slow Rush expresses anxiety about the nature of the year itself; the fact that our time was robbed from us while we had more time than ever," and called The Slow Rush "The defining album of 2020." Arrieta also singled out "On Track" as a highlight, calling it "Arguably Tame Impala's masterpiece."

Kitty Empire of The Guardian said, "It's safe to say The Slow Rush will only expand Tame Impala's audience." On the other hand, in a mixed review from The A.V. Club, Max Freedman gave the album a C+ and wrote that it "isn't quite as interesting as its predecessors in terms of songwriting and production, and this gap makes Parker's lyrical weaknesses more challenging to ignore".

=== Accolades ===
Accolades for The Slow Rush
Publication	Accolade	Rank	Ref.
Billboard	Billboard's 50 Best Albums of 2020 – Mid-Year	—N/a	
Complex	Complex's 50 Best Albums of 2020 – Mid-Year	2	
NPR	The 50 Best Albums of 2020	24	
Stereogum	Stereogum's 50 Best Albums of 2020 – Mid-Year	34	
Under the Radar	Under the Radar's Top 100 Albums of 2020	21	
Variety	Variety's Best Albums of 2020 – Mid-Year	—N/a	

== Commercial performance ==
On the US Billboard 200, The Slow Rush debuted at number three, moving 110,000 equivalent album sales. It became Tame Impala's highest-charting album in the country to date, passing the number four peak of previous release Currents. After the release of the album, all 12 tracks charted on the US Rock charts with peak numbers ranging from 2 to 17. With other record charts, the album debuted in the top 10 in many countries, reaching number one in Australia, Portugal, and Scotland.

== Track listing ==
All tracks are written by Kevin Parker.

Track listing for The Slow Rush
No.	Title	Length
1.	"One More Year"	5:22
2.	"Instant Destiny"	3:13
3.	"Borderline"	3:57
4.	"Posthumous Forgiveness"	6:05
5.	"Breathe Deeper"	6:13
6.	"Tomorrow's Dust"	5:25
7.	"On Track"	5:00
8.	"Lost in Yesterday"	4:09
9.	"Is It True"	3:58
10.	"It Might Be Time"	4:33
11.	"Glimmer"	2:08
12.	"One More Hour"	7:13
Total length:		57:16

The Slow Rush – Japanese edition (bonus track)
No.	Title	Length
13.	"Patience"	4:52
Total length:		62:18

The Slow Rush – B-Sides and Remixes
No.	Title	Length
1.	"The Boat I Row"	3:58
2.	"No Choice"	3:41
3.	"Breathe Deeper" (Lil Yachty Remix)	4:48
4.	"One More Year" (NTS Extended Version)	17:48
5.	"Patience" (Maurice Fulton Remix)	6:01
6.	"Is It True" (Four Tet Remix)	5:25
7.	"Borderline" (Blood Orange Remix)	7:17
8.	"Patience"	4:52
Total length:		53:59

The Slow Rush – Deluxe box set
No.	Title	Length
1.	"One More Year" (NTS Extended Version)	17:48
2.	"Patience" (Maurice Fulton Remix)	6:01
3.	"Patience"	4:52
4.	"Is It True" (Four Tet Remix)	5:25
5.	"Breathe Deeper" (Lil Yachty Remix)	4:48
6.	"Borderline" (Blood Orange Remix)	7:17
7.	"The Boat I Row"	3:58
8.	"No Choice"	3:41
Total length:		53:59

== Personnel ==
Tame Impala

- Kevin Parker – songwriting, performance, production, mixing, art concept, creative direction

Technical

- Greg Calbi & Steve Fallone – mastering
- Glen Goatze – co-executive production

Artwork

- Neil Krug – photography, design, art concept, creative direction

== Charts ==
=== Weekly charts ===
Weekly chart performance for The Slow Rush
Chart (2020)	Peak position
Australian Albums (ARIA)	1
Austrian Albums (Ö3 Austria)	9
Belgian Albums (Ultratop Flanders)	2
Belgian Albums (Ultratop Wallonia)	6
Canadian Albums (Billboard)	3
Croatian International Albums (HDU)	10
Danish Albums (Hitlisten)	7
Dutch Albums (Album Top 100)	2
Estonian Albums (Eesti Tipp-40)	3
Finnish Albums (Suomen virallinen lista)	12
French Albums (SNEP)	11
German Albums (Offizielle Top 100)	7
Greek Albums (IFPI)	31
Irish Albums (Official Charts)	3
Italian Albums (FIMI)	20
Japanese Hot Albums (Billboard Japan)	86
Japanese Albums (Oricon)	62
Lithuanian Albums (AGATA)	4
New Zealand Albums (RMNZ)	3
Norwegian Albums (VG-lista)	5
Polish Albums (ZPAV)	37
Portuguese Albums (AFP)	1
Scottish Albums (Official Charts)	1
Spanish Albums (Promusicae)	6
Swedish Albums (Sverigetopplistan)	8
Swiss Albums (Schweizer Hitparade)	3
UK Albums (Official Charts)	3
US Billboard 200	3
US Top Alternative Albums (Billboard)	1
US Top Rock Albums (Billboard)	1
US Indie Store Album Sales (Billboard)	1

=== Year-end charts ===
Year-end chart performance for The Slow Rush
Chart (2020)	Position
Australian Albums (ARIA)	19
Belgian Albums (Ultratop Flanders)	45
Belgian Albums (Ultratop Wallonia)	181
US Top Alternative Albums (Billboard)	19
US Top Rock Albums (Billboard)	39

== Certifications ==
Certifications for The Slow Rush
Region	Certification	Certified units/sales
Australia (ARIA)	Platinum	70,000^{‡}
France (SNEP)	Gold	50,000^{‡}
New Zealand (RMNZ)	Platinum	15,000^{‡}
Poland (ZPAV)	Gold	10,000^{‡}
United Kingdom (BPI)	Gold	100,000^{‡}
United States (RIAA)	Gold	500,000^{‡}
^{‡} Sales+streaming figures based on certification alone.
