= Patience (Tame Impala song) =

Single by Tame Impala

from the album The Slow Rush (Japanese edition and deluxe box set)
- Released: 22 March 2019
- Genre: Psychedelic pop; disco; soft rock; yacht rock
- Length: 4:53
- Label: Modular
- Songwriter: Kevin Parker
- Producer: Kevin Parker

Tame Impala singles chronology
| "The Less I Know the Better" (2015) | "Patience" (2019) | "Borderline" (2019) |

"Patience" is a song by Australian psychedelic music project Tame Impala. It was released as a single on 22 March 2019 through Modular Recordings. It was written and produced by Kevin Parker, and was his first single since "The Less I Know the Better" in 2015.

At the ARIA Music Awards of 2019, Parker was nominated for Producer of the Year and Engineer of the Year for his work on this track. Complex magazine ranked "Patience" as the 25th-best song of 2019, while Billboard ranked it 64th on their list of the best songs of 2019 and Triple J ranked it 52nd in the Triple J Hottest 100 of 2019.

== Composition ==
The track has been characterised as a "psych-disco bop", a "beat-driven, atmospheric soft-rocker", a "yacht rock cruiser", and a "playful, dancey spin on the Perth band's psychedelic pop". According to a press release the song was inspired by 1970s disco and 1990s house. Rolling Stone described the song as Parker singing "airily over a bright, colorful groove".

== Promotion ==
Kevin Parker announced the release on 22 March 2019, saying on Instagram that a new song would be released in "one hour".

== Personnel ==
- Kevin Parker – vocals, instrumentation, production, mixing, engineering
- Dave Cooley – mastering

== Charts ==
=== Weekly charts ===
| Chart (2019) | Peak position |
|---|---|
| Australia (ARIA) | 63 |
| Belgium (Ultratip Bubbling Under Flanders) | 3 |
| Belgium (Ultratip Bubbling Under Wallonia) | 36 |
| Ireland (IRMA) | 68 |
| Lithuania (AGATA) | 48 |
| New Zealand Hot Singles (RMNZ) | 9 |
| Scotland Singles (OCC) | 90 |
| UK Singles (OCC) | 79 |
| UK Rock & Metal (OCC) | 4 |
| US Adult Alternative Airplay (Billboard) | 11 |
| US Rock & Alternative Airplay (Billboard) | 45 |
| US Hot Rock & Alternative Songs (Billboard) | 10 |

=== Year-end charts ===
| Chart (2019) | Position |
|---|---|
| US Adult Alternative Songs (Billboard) | 42 |
| US Hot Rock Songs (Billboard) | 75 |

== Certifications ==
| Region | Certification | Certified units/sales |
|---|---|---|
| Australia (ARIA) | Gold | 35,000^{‡} |
^{‡} Sales+streaming figures based on certification alone.
