= It Might Be Time =

2019 single by Tame Impala

Single by Tame Impala

from the album The Slow Rush
- Released: 28 October 2019
- Genre: Psychedelic rock; art pop
- Length: 4:33
- Label: Modular; Island Australia
- Songwriter: Kevin Parker
- Producer: Kevin Parker

Tame Impala singles chronology
"Borderline" (2019)	"It Might Be Time" (2019)	"Posthumous Forgiveness" (2019)

Audio video
- "It Might Be Time" on YouTube

"It Might Be Time" is a song by Tame Impala, the musical project of the Australian multi-instrumentalist Kevin Parker. It was released through Modular Recordings and Island Records Australia on 28 October 2019, as the second single from the project's fourth studio album, The Slow Rush (2020). Parker wrote and produced the song while performing all the instruments and vocals. Predominantly led by drums, piano, and guitar, it was described by Pitchfork as a psychedelic rock and art pop song, with elements of electronic music. Lyrically, it focuses on the passage of time and the feeling of getting older.

Upon its release, "It Might Be Time" was well received by critics and was ranked at number 43 in the Triple J Hottest 100 of 2019. It was also shortlisted for Song of the Year at the APRA Music Awards of 2021. Commercially, the track reached secondary charts in the Flanders region of Belgium and in the United States, while receiving a gold certification by the Australian Recording Industry Association (ARIA).

== Background and release ==
"It Might Be Time" was one of the first tracks that Kevin Parker worked on for the Tame Impala music project after the release of the 2015 album Currents and collaborating with several musicians, including Travis Scott and Lady Gaga. He solely wrote, produced, performed, and mixed The Slow Rush (2020), including "It Might Be Time".

"It Might Be Time" was released on 28 October 2019 as the second single from The Slow Rush, which was announced three days before. A "self-isolation" version of "It Might Be Time" was shared on 30 March 2020 as part of a remixed edition of the album, subtitled An Imaginary Place. On 22 April 2020, Parker appeared on the music podcast Song Exploder to explain the origins of "It Might Be Time". He discussed the song's meaning with the host Hrishikesh Hirway, while sharing early isolated versions of the track.

== Composition ==
Musically, "It Might Be Time" is a psychedelic rock and art pop song with elements of electronic music. The groovy production of the track predominantly contains drum beats, piano, and guitar riffs. Billboard's Lars Brandle described it as "dreamy". Parker compared its result to "something N.E.R.D. would do". Lyrically, "It Might Be Time" describes the feeling of getting older and losing youth, focusing on the passage of time. Parker believed that anyone of any age could relate to the song, citing the lyric "You ain't as cool as you used to be". He stated that the hook was made in order to sound "like your own subconscious teasing you".

Critics drew several comparisons between "It Might Be Time" and the works of other musicians. Naming the rock influences present on the album, Patrick Lyons of Billboard likened the song to Breakfast in America (1979), the sixth studio album by the English band Supertramp. Mike Greenhaus of Relix compared the post-punk elements to the theme song of the American television series Stranger Things. Consequence's Christopher Thiessen opined that the song has a "jaunty Hall & Oates-like bounce". Stereogum's Chris Deville perceived similarities between "It Might Be Time" with the British-American band Foreigner and The Soft Bulletin (1999), the ninth studio album by the American band the Flaming Lips. Al Newstead of Australian Broadcasting Corporation named "It Might Be Time" as one of The Slow Rush's closest songs to "festival sing-alongs".

== Reception ==
Rolling Stone Australia's Tyler Jenke described "It Might Be Time" as one of the best tracks on the album. It was ranked at number 43 in the Triple J Hottest 100 of 2019, by the Australian radio station Triple J. At the APRA Music Awards of 2021, the song was shortlisted for Song of the Year; another song from the album, "Lost in Yesterday", received a nomination. Commercially, "It Might Be Time" charted on three secondary charts. It peaked at number 7 on the Ultratip Bubbling Under in the Flanders region of Belgium, and appeared on the US Hot Rock & Alternative Songs and Adult Alternative Airplay charts at number 8 and 39, respectively. In 2021, the song was certified gold by the Australian Recording Industry Association (ARIA).

== Charts ==
Chart (2019)	Peak position
Belgium (Ultratip Bubbling Under Flanders)	7
US Adult Alternative Airplay (Billboard)	39
US Hot Rock & Alternative Songs (Billboard)	8

== Certifications ==
Region	Certification	Certified units/sales
Australia (ARIA)	Gold	35,000^{‡}
^{‡} Sales+streaming figures based on certification alone.
