= New Person, Same Old Mistakes =

Song by Tame Impala

from the album Currents
- Released: 17 July 2015
- Recorded: 2012–2015
- Studio: Kevin Parker's home studio, Fremantle, Western Australia
- Genre: Synth-pop; psychedelic pop; psychedelic rock; chillwave; soft rock; R&B
- Length: 6:03
- Label: Modular; Fiction; Interscope
- Songwriter: Kevin Parker
- Producer: Kevin Parker

"New Person, Same Old Mistakes" is a song by Australian psychedelic music project Tame Impala. It was released on 17 July 2015 as the closing track for their third studio album Currents (2015).

== Background and production ==
In a 2025 interview with Zane Lowe, Kevin Parker stated that "New Person, Same Old Mistakes" was actually a last minute addition to Currents as well as the song "Elephant" from Lonerism.

== "Same Ol' Mistakes" ==
The Barbadian singer Rihanna covered the song on her 2016 album, Anti, retitling her version to "Same Ol' Mistakes". Parker gave the cover his blessing, saying, "We're all really happy with how the song turned out, love it!" He stated that he imagined "a female R&B voice" singing the song in the first place, adding, "I guess it comes back to appreciating ideas being malleable and being able to imagine music in different worlds".

== Legacy ==
The song was first performed live in 2016 at Heineken Music Hall (Now known as AFAS Live) in Amsterdam for the Currents Tour. The song has since been included on the setlist of every Tame Impala tour.

The song was sampled in "Rockstar" by Thai rapper and singer Lisa.

In 2025, Kevin Parker performed an acoustic version of the song for NPR's Tiny Desk Concert.

== Personnel ==
Tame Impala

- Kevin Parker – songwriting, performance, production, recording, mixing, cover concept

Technical

- Rob Grant – additional recording, mix advice
- Greg Calbi – mastering

== Charts ==
Weekly chart performance
Chart (2016)	Peak position
US Hot Rock & Alternative Songs (Billboard)	38

Weekly chart performance
Chart (2026)	Peak position
New Zealand (Recorded Music NZ)	49

== Certifications ==
Region	Certification	Certified units/sales
Australia (ARIA)	Gold	35,000^{‡}
Denmark (IFPI Danmark)	Gold	45,000^{‡}
New Zealand (RMNZ)	Platinum	30,000^{‡}
United Kingdom (BPI)	Gold	400,000^{‡}
United States (RIAA)	Platinum	1,000,000^{‡}
^{‡} Sales+streaming figures based on certification alone.
