= Posthumous Forgiveness =

Single by Tame Impala

from the album The Slow Rush
- Released: 3 December 2019
- Genre: Psychedelic rock; progressive rock
- Length: 6:05
- Label: Modular
- Songwriter: Kevin Parker
- Producer: Kevin Parker

Tame Impala singles chronology
"It Might Be Time" (2019)	"Posthumous Forgiveness" (2019)	"Lost in Yesterday" (2020)

"Posthumous Forgiveness" is a song by the Australian psychedelic music project Tame Impala. It is the fourth track on the 2020 album The Slow Rush and was released as a promotional single on 3 December 2019. The song was written by Kevin Parker, who also performed all instruments and vocals.

The single peaked at number eight on Billboard's Hot Rock Songs chart.

The song was voted into 200th place on the Australian Triple J Hottest 200 of 2020, which was broadcast on 24 January 2021.

== Background ==
The song was called a "reckoning with Parker's now-deceased father", as well as a cathartic rumination on their complicated relationship and Parker now being a celebrity.

== Reception ==
Pitchfork thought that the riff in the first part of "Posthumous Forgiveness" sounded like something Jimmy Page would have played. The A.V. Club thought that the "mildly trippy effects" in the song "saps poignance" during the first two minutes.

== Charts ==
Chart (2019–2020)	Peak position
Portugal (AFP)	135
US Hot Rock & Alternative Songs (Billboard)	8
