= Borderline (Tame Impala song) =

Single by Tame Impala

from the album The Slow Rush
- Released: 12 April 2019
- Genre: Psychedelic pop; soft rock; disco; yacht rock
- Length: 3:57 (album remaster); 4:34 (original single)
- Label: Modular
- Songwriter: Kevin Parker
- Producer: Kevin Parker

Tame Impala singles chronology
"Patience" (2019)	"Borderline" (2019)	"It Might Be Time" (2019)

Alternative cover
- Single cover of Blood Orange remix

"Borderline" is a song by the Australian psychedelic music project Tame Impala. It is the third track on the 2020 studio album The Slow Rush, and was released as a single on 12 April 2019 through Modular Recordings. The song was written by Kevin Parker, who performed all instruments and vocals. The song was influenced by yacht rock and disco, and the lyrics explore nihilism and insecurity. It was debuted during the band's performance on Saturday Night Live on 30 March; Parker ad-libbed much of the initial lyrics since he had not yet finalised them.

The single release in 2019 predated any details about The Slow Rush, which was delayed until 2020. Parker reworked the song for its inclusion on the album, making musical and lyrical changes. He revealed that he altered the song for the album mainly because he realised the bassline was not prominent enough. After releasing the album, the previously released single version of "Borderline" was removed from all streaming services.

== Background and production ==
After spending extensive time working on Tame Impala's third album Currents (2015), Kevin Parker decided to shift away from being a perfectionist towards more spontaneity, adding that if he "finds something that sounds good I should just do it and not think about it". "Borderline" was released as a single in 2019 but was reworked and re-released for multiple reasons. For one, Parker said he had accidentally made the bassline too quiet, and also wanted to change a few other elements of the song, as he had been pressured to release it prematurely. He elaborated: "The way I describe it is the way it sounds now is the way I was hearing it when I released it the first time. So for me, the drums sounded just heaps more hard-hitting. And it was just things that I could hear in the song that I didn't realise no one else could, for example, the bassline, which was just kind of an example of lack of perspective when you're working on a song, or anything that anyone's working on ever. You lose perspective when you're working on it, which is good, too, it's kind of beautiful that you have no idea what you're doing."

== Promotion ==
Tame Impala debuted the song during a 30 March 2019 performance on Saturday Night Live. Since the song had not been released yet, Parker sang some improvised lyrics that were later changed. He later announced the release of the song through Instagram, posting the cover art with the caption "Friday". They later performed the song on The Tonight Show Starring Jimmy Fallon on 22 September 2020.

== Critical reception ==
In a mention of the band's Saturday Night Live performance, Music Feeds called the song a "groovy, toe-tapping lounge chiller". Triple J ranked it 18th in the Triple J Hottest 100 of 2019.

== Personnel ==
- Kevin Parker – vocals, instrumentation, production, mixing, engineering
- Dave Cooley – mastering

== Charts ==
=== Weekly charts ===
Chart (2019–2020)	Peak position
Australia (ARIA)	58
Ireland (IRMA)	63
New Zealand Hot Singles (RMNZ)	17
Portugal (AFP)	96
UK Singles (Official Charts)	78
US Hot Rock & Alternative Songs (Billboard)	3

Chart (2025–2026)	Peak position
Lithuania (AGATA)	91
Norway (IFPI Norge)	84

=== Year-end charts ===
Chart (2019)	Position
US Hot Rock Songs (Billboard)	57

== Certifications ==
Region	Certification	Certified units/sales
Australia (ARIA)	3× Platinum	210,000^{‡}
Brazil (Pro-Música Brasil)	Platinum	40,000^{‡}
Denmark (IFPI Danmark)	Gold	45,000^{‡}
France (SNEP)	Platinum	200,000^{‡}
New Zealand (RMNZ)	3× Platinum	90,000^{‡}
Poland (ZPAV)	Platinum	50,000^{‡}
Portugal (AFP)	Gold	5,000^{‡}
Spain (Promusicae)	Gold	30,000^{‡}
United Kingdom (BPI)	Platinum	600,000^{‡}
United States (RIAA)	Platinum	1,000,000^{‡}
^{‡} Sales+streaming figures based on certification alone.

== Television performances ==
Tame Impala debuted the song during their performance on Saturday Night Live on 30 March 2019. According to Parker, the lyrics for the song had not been finished yet, leading him to improvise during the performance.
