= Innerspeaker Tour =

2010-11 concert tour by Tame Impala

- Tour by Tame Impala
- Promotional poster for European tour dates in 2011
- Location: North America; Europe; Australia
- Associated album: Innerspeaker
- Start date: May 21, 2010
- End date: July 23, 2011
- No. of shows: 110

Tame Impala concert chronology
- Sundown Syndrome Tour (2009); Innerspeaker Tour (2010–11); Lonerism Tour (2012–14)

The Innerspeaker Tour was a concert tour by Tame Impala, the Australian psychedelic music project of Kevin Parker, in support of their first studio album Innerspeaker. The tour began on May 21, 2010 in Melbourne, and concluded on July 23, 2011 at On The Bright Side Festival 2011 in Fremantle.

== Background ==
After finishing the Sundown Syndrome Tour in 2009, Tame Impala would announce the project's first studio album Innerspeaker alongside Australian tour dates on March 8, 2010.

The single "Solitude Is Bliss" was released on April 1, 2010 as the first single from the album.

Innerspeaker was released on May 21, 2010 to rave reviews.

On September 15, 2010, tour dates for North America were announced.

== Tour dates ==
List of 2010 concerts, showing date, city, country, and venue.
Date (2010)	City	Country	Venue
May 21	Melbourne	Australia	Forum Theatre
May 22	Melbourne	Australia	JB Hi-Fi City
May 27	Fremantle	Australia	Metropolis Fremantle
May 31 (Note: The show on May 31, 2010 in Quincy was part of Sasquatch! Music Festival 2010.)	Quincy	United States	The Gorge Amphitheatre
June 1	Portland	United States	Crystal Ballroom
June 7	Houston	United States	House of Blues
June 11	Morrison	United States	Red Rocks Amphitheatre
June 15	Columbus	United States	Lifestyle Communities Pavilion
June 18	Chicago	United States	Riviera Theatre
June 21	Chicago	United States	Subterranean
June 23	Brooklyn	United States	Coco 66
June 24	New York City	United States	Pianos
June 25	Brooklyn	United States	Glasslands Gallery
June 29	Los Angeles	United States	Silverlake Lounge
July 31 (Note: The show on July 31, 2010 in Woodford was part of Splendour in the Grass 2010.)	Woodford	Australia	Woodfordia
August 17	London	United Kingdom	Cargo
August 19 (Note: The show on August 17, 2010 in Hasselt was part of Pukkelpop 2010.)	Hasselt	Belgium	Domein Kiewit
August 20 (Note: The show on August 20, 2010 in Biddinghuizen was part of Lowlands Festival 2010.)	Biddinghuizen	Netherlands	Evenemententerrein Walibi Holland
August 22	Großpösna	Germany	Störmthaler See
August 24	Berlin	Germany	Comet Club
August 26	Paris	France	Nouveau Casino
August 30	London	United Kingdom	Rough Trade East
September 19	Newtown	Australia	Eliza Street
October 8	Hobart	Australia	University of Tasmania UniBar
October 9	Canberra	Australia	ANU Bar & Refectory
October 14	Syndey	Australia	Enmore Theatre
October 15	Melbourne	Australia	Palace Theatre
October 16	Brisbane	Australia	The Tivoli
October 22	Perth	Australia	Astor Theatre
October 23 (Note: The show on October 23, 2010 in Newcastle was part of Fat as Butter Music Festival 2010.)	Newcastle	Australia	Camp Shortland
October 26	Birmingham	United Kingdom	O2 Academy Birmingham
October 27	Manchester	United Kingdom	The Ruby Lounge
October 28	London	United Kingdom	Heaven
October 30	Tourcoing	France	Le Grand Mix
October 31	Nantes	France	Le Lieu Unique
November 1	Paris	France	La Maroquinerie
November 3	Saint-Josse-ten-Noode	Belgium	Le Botanique
November 5	Zurich	Switzerland	Mascotte
November 8	Vienna	Austria	B72
November 9	Munich	Germany	59:1
November 11	Hamburg	Germany	Beatlemania
November 12 (Note: The show on November 12, 2010 in Wangles was part of Rolling Stone Weekender 2010.)	Wangels	Germany	Ferienpark Weissenhäuser Strand
November 13 (Note: The show on November 13, 2010 in Amsterdam was part of London Calling 2010.)	Amsterdam	Netherlands	Paradiso
November 16	Washington, D.C.	United States	Black Cat
November 18	New York City	United States	Bowery Ballroom
November 19	New York City	United States	Bowery Ballroom
November 21	Philadelphia	United States	First Unitarian Church
November 22	Boston	United States	Paradise Rock Club
November 23	Montreal	Canada	La Sala Rossa
November 24	Toronto	Canada	Horseshoe Tavern
November 26	Chicago	United States	Double Door
November 27	Minneapolis	United States	7th Street Entry
November 29	Lawrence	United States	Jackpot Saloon & Music Hall
December 1	Austin	United States	Emo's
December 2	Dallas	United States	The Loft
December 4	Denver	United States	Bluebird Theater
December 6	Salt Lake City	United States	Urban Lounge
December 7	Boise	United States	Neurolux
December 9	Vancouver	Canada	Biltmore Cabaret
December 10	Seattle	United States	Neumos
December 11	Portland	United States	Doug Fir Lounge
December 13	San Francisco	United States	The Independent
December 14	Los Angeles	United States	Echoplex
December 30 (Note: The show on December 30, 2010 in Marion Bay was part of Falls Music Festival Tasmania 2010.)	Marion Bay	Australia	Marion Bay Falls Festival Site
December 31 (Note: The show on December 31, 2010 in Lorne was part of Falls Music Festival Tasmania 2010.)	Lorne	Australia	Surf Coast Shire

List of 2011 concerts, showing date, city, country, and venue.
Date (2011)	City	Country	Venue
January 1 (Note: The show on January 1, 2011 in Sydney was part of Field Day 2011.)	Sydney	Australia	The Domain
January 3 (Note: The show on January 3, 2011 in Busselton was part of Southbound Festival 2011.)	Busselton	Australia	Sir Stewart Bovell Park
January 5 (Note: The show on January 5, 2011 in Brisbane was part of Sunset Sounds 2011.)	Brisbane	Australia	Riverstage
January 8	Sydney	Australia	Metro Theatre
March 5 (Note: The show on March 5, 2011 in Brisbane was part of Future Music Festival Brisbane 2011.)	Brisbane	Australia	Doomben Racecourse
March 6 (Note: The show on March 6, 2011 in Brisbane was part of Future Music Festival Perth 2011.)	Perth	Australia	Arena Joondalup
March 12 (Note: The show on March 12, 2011 in Sydney was part of Future Music Festival Sydney 2011.)	Sydney	Australia	Royal Randwick Racecourse
March 13 (Note: The show on March 13, 2011 in Melbourne was part of Future Music Festival Melbourne 2011.)	Melbourne	Australia	Flemington Racecourse
April 13	Mexico City	Mexico	Campo Marte
April 15 (Note: The show on April 15, 2011 in Indio was part of Coachella 2011.)	Indio	United States	Empire Polo Club
April 18	San Francisco	United States	The Fillmore
April 20	Portland	United States	Wonder Ballroom
April 21	Vancouver	Canada	Commodore Ballroom
April 22	Seattle	United States	Neumos
April 25	New York City	United States	Webster Hall
April 27	Philadelphia	United States	First Unitarian Church
April 28	Boston	United States	Paradise Rock Club
April 30	Montreal	Canada	Café Campus
May 1	Toronto	Canada	Phoenix Concert Theatre
May 3	Chicago	United States	Lincoln Hall
May 4	Chicago	United States	Lincoln Hall
May 6	Washington, D.C.	United States	Black Cat
June 1 (Note: The show on June 1, 2011 in Sydney was part of Vivid Live 2011.)	Sydney	Australia	Sydney Opera House
June 17	Berlin	Germany	Festsaal Kreuzberg
June 18 (Note: The show on June 18, 2011 in Neuhausen ob Eck was part of Southside Festival 2011.)	Neuhausen ob Eck	Germany	take-off GewerbePark
June 19 (Note: The show on June 19, 2011 in Scheeßel was part of Hurricane Festival 2011.)	Scheeßel	Germany	Eichenring
June 20	Cologne	Germany	Gebäude 9
June 22	London	United Kingdom	Roundhouse
June 25 (Note: The show on June 25, 2011 in Pilton was part of Glastonbury Festival 2011.)	Pilton	United Kingdom	Worthy Farm
June 26	Utrecht	Netherlands	Tivoli
June 28 (Note: The show on June 28, 2011 in Arendal was part of Hovefestivalen 2011.)	Arendal	Norway	Tromøya
June 30 (Note: The show on June 30, 2011 in Roskilde was part of Roskilde Festival 2011.)	Roskilde	Denmark	Dyrskuepladsen
July 1 (Note: The show on July 1, 2011 in Arras was part of Main Square 2011.)	Arras	France	La Citadelle
July 2	Milton Keynes	United Kingdom	Milton Keynes National Bowl
July 3 (Note: The show on July 3, 2011 in Werchter was part Rock Werchter 2011.)	Werchter	Belgium	Festivalpark
July 5 (Note: The show on July 5, 2011 in Paris was part of Days Off Festival 2011.)	Paris	France	Cité de la Musique
July 6	Manchester	United Kingdom	Sound Control
July 8 (Note: The show on July 8, 2011 in Naas was part of Oxegen 2011.)	Naas	Ireland	Punchestown Racecourse
July 9 (Note: The show on July 9, 2011 in Lyon was part of T in the Park 2011.)	Kinross	Scotland	Balado
July 11 (Note: The show on July 11, 2011 in Lyon was part of Les Nuits de Fourvière 2011.)	Lyon	France	Théâtre Antique de Fourvière
July 14 (Note: The show on July 14, 2011 in Lyon was part of Super Bock Super Rock 2011.)	Sesimbra	Portugal	Meco
July 16 (Note: The show on July 16, 2011 in Sesimbra was part of Benicàssim 2011.)	Benicàssim	Spain	Recinto de Festivales de Benicàssim
July 18 (Note: The show on July 18, 2011 in Turin was part of Spaziale Festival 2011.)	Turin	Italy	Open air Area211
July 19 (Note: The show on July 19, 2011 in Nyon was part of Paléo Festival 2011.)	Nyon	Switzerland	Plaine de l'Asse
July 23 (Note: The show on July 23, 2011 in Fremantle was part of On the Bright Side Festival 2011.)	Fremantle	Australia	Esplanade Reserve

Poster promoting the Innerspeaker 10th Anniversary performance at Wave House

=== 10th anniversary performance ===
On March 31, 2021, Tame Impala announced a special performance of Innerspeaker in its entirety. The performance was globally livestreamed and took place at the Wave House in Injidup, Western Australia on April 21, 2021. Fans were able to purchase tickets to view the livestreamed performance.

== Setlist ==
This setlist is from the May 3, 2011 concert in Chicago. It does not represent all of the concerts for the duration of the tour.

1. "Why Won't You Make Up Your Mind?"
2. "Solitude Is Bliss"
3. "It Is Not Meant to Be"
4. "Alter Ego"
5. "Expectation"
6. "Desire Be Desire Go"
7. "Angel" (Massive Attack Cover)
8. "Jeremy's Storm"
9. "Lucidity"
10. "Runway, Houses, City, Clouds"
11. "Skeleton Tiger"
12. "Half Full Glass of Wine"

== Live band ==
- Kevin Parker – lead vocals, guitar
- Dominic Simper – bass guitar, guitar, synthesizer, keyboards
- Jay Watson – drums, backing vocals
- Nick Allbrook – bass guitar, guitar, synthesizer
