= Innerspeaker =

Studio album by Tame Impala
- Released: 21 May 2010
- Recorded: June–August 2009
- Studios: Wave House (Injidup, Western Australia)
- Genres: Psychedelic rock; neo-psychedelia; indie rock; lo-fi
- Length: 53:15
- Label: Modular
- Producer: Kevin Parker

Tame Impala chronology
Live at the Corner (2010)	Innerspeaker (2010)	Lonerism (2012)

Singles from Innerspeaker
- 1. "Solitude Is Bliss" Released: 1 April 2010; 2. "Lucidity" Released: July 2010; 3. "Expectation" Released: 3 December 2010; 4. "Why Won't You Make Up Your Mind?" Released: 30 January 2011

Innerspeaker (sometimes stylised as InnerSpeaker) is the debut studio album by Australian musical project Tame Impala, released on 21 May 2010 by Modular Recordings. The album was recorded and produced by musician Kevin Parker at a remote beach shack in Western Australia from June to August 2009, who also wrote every track on it except for the interlude after "The Bold Arrow of Time".

Innerspeaker was acclaimed by critics for its reminiscence and reinvigorating of 1960s psychedelic rock. The album peaked at number 4 on the ARIA Charts and was certified platinum in the country. At the J Awards of 2010, the album won Australian Album of the Year. It was recognized as the 83rd Best Album of the Decade So Far by Pitchfork in August 2014. In March 2021, a 4xLP reissue of the album was released to celebrate the album's 10th anniversary.

== Background ==
Tame Impala had previously released their self-titled EP in 2008 and single "Sundown Syndrome" in 2009. In the lead-up to the release of Innerspeaker, four small video snippets were released through their YouTube channel, showing them practicing the songs, "The Bold Arrow of Time", "Island Walking" and another instrumental piece. The album contains two re-recorded songs, "Desire Be Desire Go" (previously released on their self-titled EP) and "The Bold Arrow of Time" (previously recorded, but unreleased).

Past Tame Impala releases were done by Kevin Parker purely for his own enjoyment. Innerspeaker marks the first time Parker has "recorded something for an intended release. In the past [he has] just recorded a song, then done another two weeks later and eventually put them together." While Tame Impala tour as a band, it is Parker's personal music project in which he writes and records all the music to. Commenting on this, Parker said "Tame Impala is just one sliver of the giant amount of noise-making that we do as a circle of friends. I don't feel bad doing the recording by myself because I don't expect that input in their bands...to us Tame Impala is just Kevin Parker's project and everyone has a project" and "Tame Impala has always been a solo project. It has two halves: one half is the recording side which is very calculated and pieced together, and the other side is the live side, where we take what's been recorded and turn them into live songs." Parker has been recording music solo for a long time, as he explains "I’ve always recorded music. When I was 12, I used to set up two tape machines and multi-track myself. First, I’d record a beat on the drums, then, I’d play that tape into another tape recorder while playing keyboard; then I’d take that tape and play bass guitar along with the drums and keyboard. I’d keep adding instruments. I did that for a long time until my dad bought me an 8-track, and then I continued recording music by myself, even if I was in other bands at the same time." Parker's father "played a lot of music as a hobby" and was a "big influence" on Kevin.

== Recording ==
The album was recorded almost entirely at Wave House, Injidup, a beach shack about four hours south of Perth with 180 degree views of the Indian Ocean, with "no internet, no phone reception and no TVs". While it had been reported that Tame Impala were recording in a mansion, Parker ran into problems: "The mansion isn't really like a mansion to us, it's more like a big, wooden house; the roof was leaking and the power was so bad that it kept turning off and I kept losing drum tracks. I lost a whole day's worth of drum tracks one day while recording Innerspeaker. Sometimes the power would go off for a second, which was enough to kill off my eight-track, and I lost everything. We also had plastic on top of everything because the roof was leaking so bad". Still, he maintained that "it's the most amazing scenery [he has] ever woken up to" and that recording in the house was a luxury, with the scenery having a subconscious influence on the recording.

Recording started in June 2009 and finished in August 2009. Parts of the album were recorded all over the house, with some being recorded on the balcony overlooking the ocean whilst the Fremantle Doctor blew towards the house. Additional recording took place at Poon's Head Studio and at Parker's House. Regarding the recording environment, Parker said, "the idea of going to some flash studio where there's some stranger telling you how to arrange your song is pretty absurd to us". Consequently, the majority of the album was recorded and produced by Parker, with Jay Watson and Dominic Simper contributing small parts to the recording.

Mixing began in November 2009 and was undertaken by acclaimed Flaming Lips producer Dave Fridmann at Tarbox Road Studios in Cassadaga, New York. Originally, Parker had intended to make the entire album by himself, recording, mixing and producing it all by himself, but he ran into problems when he was "mixing it and couldn't get the sounds [he] wanted to." Parker wanted it to sound "absolutely explosive" but was not able to do so on his own. At first, he was hesitant to let Fridmann mix it and was "torn about instantly handing over everything". However, he later concluded that "in the end, there's no way in hell [he] could've made the album sound as good as Dave [Fridmann] made it sound" and that his experiences working with Fridmann made him "feel like [he had] taken a giant leap forward as an engineer". Speaking about the album's and Fridmann's slightly lo-fi sound, Parker said "it has a different emotion to it, it brings out a different feeling".

Tim Holmes from the band Death in Vegas also came along during the recording of Innerspeaker to handle engineering duties, but was not required very often. As Parker recalls, "I told him that the Tame Impala set-up was pretty unprofessional and that there wouldn't be much for him to do. Tim was totally cool with it. He said he'd bring his fishing rod and help out when needed." Parker later said, "He encouraged me to use some different mics instead of some old mics I was using, which helped a lot. I look back now and it was really invaluable having him there."

== Artwork ==
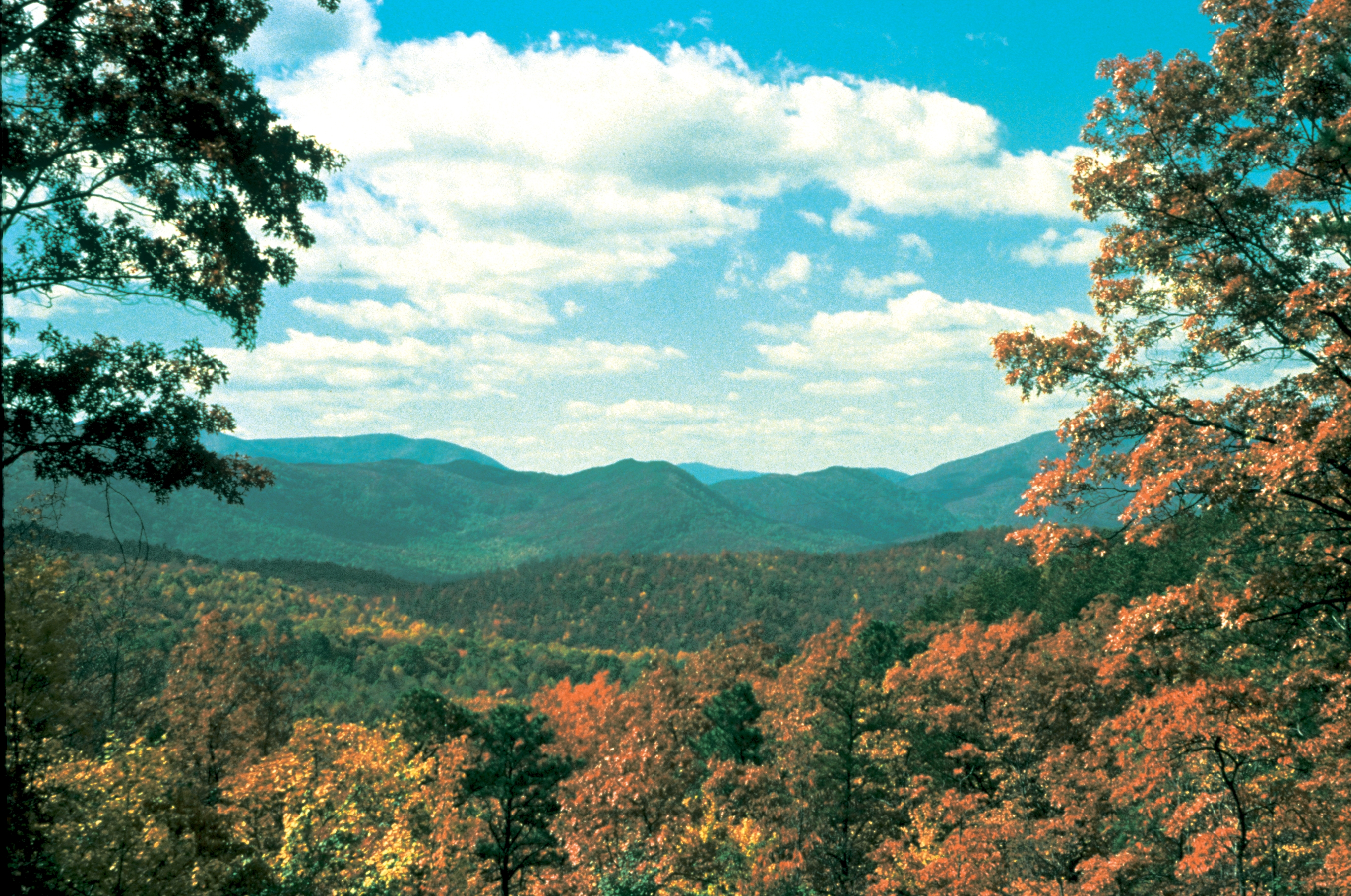
Overlook from the Great Smoky Mountains National Park. This photograph was later digitally altered for the cover of Innerspeaker.

Innerspeaker features album artwork from Australian artist Leif Podhajsky. It features an image of the Great Smoky Mountains National Park in North Carolina, United States. The original image has been digitally altered using the Droste effect in recursion to make it appear as if the image continues into itself, creating a distinctly psychedelic feeling reminiscent of Pink Floyd's album cover for Ummagumma.

Parker revealed his intentions for the album artwork: "I had an idea for the album cover but didn't have the graphic design skills or the resources to carry it out. It was to be a shot of some scenery where the features of the landscape repeat infinitely into the horizon. Leif Podhajsky is an artist we found who has an amazing eye for weird cosmic art. We'll probably ask him to do the next album!" and "I think it's pretty important that you have the right image for people to associate with the sound. Especially the colours. With the InnerSpeaker cover we worked with a graphic artist for a long time to get the right shapes and colours."

The album cover for Innerspeaker was nominated for an ARIA Award in 2010 for Best Cover Art.

== Release ==
Innerspeaker was released on 21 May 2010. Four singles were released from the album, the first single, "Solitude Is Bliss", was released in April 2010, second single, "Lucidity" was released in July 2010, third single, "Expectation" was released in December 2010 and fourth single, "Why Won't You Make Up Your Mind?" was released in February 2011. "Solitude Is Bliss", "Lucidity" and "Expectation" all featured music videos.

On 12 May 2010, iTunes accidentally made Innerspeaker available to buy immediately (not pre-order) and therefore it was leaked before the official release date. It was also leaked on the internet in poor quality a month earlier. Parker commented on this poor quality leak by saying "That was a real bummer. It was kind of bittersweet because I was glad that people could finally hear it, I wasn’t that pissed off about the sales or release or whatever, it was just that it was in bad quality from how it actually sounded."

Originally, Parker intended for Innerspeaker to be a double album, but eventually lacked the motivation to make it. Many of the songs demos intended for the double album were later leaked onto YouTube in unmixed form. An image in the Limited Edition version of Innerspeaker shows a drafted track listing, featuring titles such as "Feelin' the Dread", "I Know Where", "Dance", "Latenight Moonlight", "Pretty Song", "Stormy", "Funk Jam" and "Don't Ask", some of which have not seen an official release, which were possibly considered being released on the double album. In 2012, Tame Impala recorded a cover of "That's All for Everyone" to be included on the Fleetwood Mac tribute album Just Tell Me That You Want Me, which was originally intended to be released on Innerspeaker. "When we made our first album our first idea is that it would be a double album and that it would finish with a cover of "That's All for Everyone". The joke being that we'd choose a song from Fleetwood Mac's double and use it to close out our double album, which was also our debut album. It never actually happened because we realized that making a double album was gonna be way too much work. So it was great when we got the offer to be included on that compilation because it meant we finally had a reason to record that song."

The title Innerspeaker was selected by Parker, which was a term he came up with to try to explain the "feeling you get when you're at your most inspired, the idea that [a song] just appears to you vividly and if someone plugged a stereo into your brain they'd be able to hear it" and also said "the songs come from somewhere internal, rather than slowly taking shape with a bunch of guys jamming in a room. One way of writing a song is that you've got an idea in your head and build a song around that. Another is more of a collaborative thing: It starts out as nothing and gets put together with whatever happens. This album was very much a case of the former; it's meant to give off the idea that the songs would be preserved."

On 27 May 2011, Innerspeaker: Limited Edition was released on CD. This collector's edition includes a second disc, Extraspeaker, containing B-sides and remixes.

== Critical reception ==
Professional ratings
Aggregate scores
Source	Rating
AnyDecentMusic?	7.5/10
Review scores
Source	Rating
AllMusic	4.5/5 stars
The A.V. Club	A−
DIY	7/10
The Guardian	4/5 stars
The Irish Times	4/5 stars
Mojo	4/5 stars
NME	4/5 stars
Pitchfork	8.5/10
Q	4/5 stars
Uncut	4/5 stars

Innerspeaker was released to critical acclaim, with many praising Parker's ability to put a modern spin on elements of 1960s psychedelic rock, creating a new and original sound. The album was awarded with being the feature album for Triple J Radio from 16 May to the 22nd. The album was nominated for a J Award for Australian Album of the Year on 26 July 2010. At the end of Triple J's Australian Music Month (November), it was announced as the winner. It was also nominated, and ultimately won, the Rolling Stone award for Album of the Year. It was also featured on the Triple J Hottest 100 Australian Albums of All Time in 2011, firstly being featured at number 18 in the list voted by Australian musicians and industry experts, and secondly being featured at number 19 on the public voted list. It was nominated for an ARIA Award in 2010 in the categories of Album of the Year and Best Rock Album and also for a WAMI Award in 2011 for Most Popular Album.

Upon release, the album entered the Recent Releases chart on UK-based review aggregator AnyDecentMusic? with an ADM rating of 7.5. Pitchfork placed it at number 43 on its list "The Top 50 Albums of 2010".

== Track listing ==
All tracks are written by Kevin Parker, except interlude after "The Bold Arrow of Time", written by Jay Watson and Parker.

No.	Title	Length
1.	"It Is Not Meant to Be"	5:21
2.	"Desire Be Desire Go"	4:26
3.	"Alter Ego"	4:47
4.	"Lucidity"	4:31
5.	"Why Won't You Make Up Your Mind?"	3:19
6.	"Solitude Is Bliss"	3:55
7.	"Jeremy's Storm"	5:28
8.	"Expectation"	6:02
9.	"The Bold Arrow of Time"	4:24
10.	"Runway, Houses, City, Clouds"	7:15
11.	"I Don't Really Mind"	3:47
Total length:		53:15

Vinyl editions split tracks between sides as the following: tracks 1 to 3 (A), 4 to 6 (B), 7 to 9 (C), 10 and 11 (D).

Bonus tracks
No.	Title	Length
12.	"30 Minutes with Mathew Saville" (Secret bonus track†)	27:19
13.	"Island Walking" (iTunes bonus track†)	3:04

† The iTunes version has "Island Walking" as the 7th of its 12 tracks, placed between "Solitude Is Bliss" and "Jeremy's Storm".

† This track is found by inserting the Innerspeaker CD into a computer CD drive, which takes you to a webpage featuring this track plus Live at the Corner and extra videos. It is an improvised jam session which features musician and photographer Matthew Saville on drums, with Kevin Parker playing guitar and Dominic Simper playing bass.

Extraspeaker
No.	Title	Length
1.	"Sundown Syndrome"	5:50
2.	"Remember Me" (Blue Boy cover)	4:22
3.	"Half Full Glass of Wine"	4:27
4.	"Wander"	5:14
5.	"Why Won't You Make Up Your Mind?" (Erol Alkan Rework)	8:14
6.	"Lucidity" (Pilooski Remix)	5:30
7.	"Solitude Is Bliss" (Mickey Moonlight T.A.M Remix)	3:59
8.	"41 Mojitos" (Canyons Poolside Dub)	6:20
9.	"Canyons Sunrise Reprise"	7:45
Total length:		51:41

The 10th anniversary edition includes new mixes and previously unreleased material. Side E (12 & 13) were mixed by Kevin Parker at Fremantle in 2020, Side G (16) is a collage of demos cut and pasted by Parker from sessions dating 2008–2010, and Side H (17) is a one-take jam at Wave House in Injidup, Western Australia, dating July 2009, with Kevin Parker on guitar, Dom Simper on bass and Matthew C. Saville on drums.

10th anniversary edition bonus tracks
No.	Title	Length
12.	"Alter Ego" (2020 mix)	4:48
13.	"Runway, Houses, City, Clouds" (2020 mix)	7:13
14.	"Why Won't You Make Up Your Mind?" (instrumental)	3:19
15.	"It Is Not Meant to Be" (instrumental)	5:22
16.	"Demos"	20:43
17.	"Wave House Live Jam"	17:37
Total length:		59:05

== Personnel ==
Tame Impala

- Kevin Parker – recording, production; all vocals and instruments except:
- Dom Simper – bass guitar (track 9), additional guitar (track 10), additional sound effects (track 7)
- Jay Watson – drums (tracks 6, 9), guitar (interlude after track 9)

Production

- Tim Holmes – engineering
- Dave Fridmann – mixing
- Greg Calbi – mastering

Design

- Leif Podhajsky – artwork

== Charts ==
=== Weekly charts ===
2010–2011 weekly chart performance for Innerspeaker
Chart (2010–2011)	Peak position
Australian Albums (ARIA)	4
Belgian Albums (Ultratop Flanders)	73
Belgian Alternative Albums (Ultratop Flanders)	28
Dutch Albums (Album Top 100)	83
Dutch Alternative Albums (Dutch Charts)	5
UK Albums (Official Charts)	144
UK Independent Albums (Official Charts)	24
US Heatseekers Albums (Billboard)	28
US Vinyl Albums (Billboard)	9

2014 weekly chart performance for Innerspeaker
Chart (2014)	Peak position
US Indie Store Album Sales (Billboard)	25

2019 weekly chart performance for Innerspeaker
Chart (2019)	Peak position
UK Rock & Metal Albums (Official Charts)	19

2021 weekly chart performance for Innerspeaker
Chart (2021)	Peak position
German Albums (Offizielle Top 100)	47
Scottish Albums (Official Charts)	35
UK Physical Albums (OCC)	27
UK Vinyl Albums (OCC)	13
US Top Album Sales (Billboard)	58

2025 weekly chart performance for Innerspeaker
Chart (2025)	Peak position
Croatian International Albums (HDU)	38

=== Year-end charts ===
Year-end chart performance for Innerspeaker
Chart (2010)	Position
Australian Albums (ARIA)	97

== Certifications ==
Region	Certification	Certified units/sales
Australia (ARIA)	Platinum	70,000^{^}
United Kingdom (BPI)	Gold	100,000^{‡}
^{^} Shipments figures based on certification alone.^{‡} Sales+streaming figures based on certification alone.

== Awards and accolades ==
=== Rolling Stone Awards ===
Year	Nominee / work	Award	Result
2011	Innerspeaker	Album of the Year	Won

=== J Awards ===
Year	Nominee / work	Award	Result
2010	Innerspeaker	Australian Album of the Year	Won

=== ARIA Awards ===
Year	Nominee / work	Award	Result
2010	Innerspeaker	Album of the Year	Nominated
2010	Innerspeaker	Best Rock Album	Nominated
2010	Innerspeaker	Best Cover Art	Nominated

=== WAMI Awards ===
Year	Nominee / work	Award	Result
2011	Innerspeaker	Most Popular Album	Nominated
