= Tame Impala H.I.T.S. 003 =

Tame Impala

EP by Tame Impala
- Released: September 2008
- Genre: Psychedelic rock
- Length: 28:20
- Label: Hole In The Sky
- Producer: Kevin Parker, Canyons, Fred Cherry

Tame Impala chronology
Tame Impala (2008)	Tame Impala (2008)

Tame Impala is the debut extended play by Australian musical project Tame Impala, released in September 2008, through the label, Hole in the Sky. It is the first official release by Kevin Parker under the Tame Impala moniker, and only a small number of copies were printed – it is currently out of print. The label was established in 2007 by Perth disco-pop duo and producers Canyons.

The six-track EP has the first three tracks repeated by remixes: two by Canyons' members, Ryan "Sea-Mist" Grieve and Leo "Holiday" Thompson, and the third by Fred Cherry. Two tracks, "Half Full Glass of Wine" and "Skeleton Tiger", were released on the band's next EP, Tame Impala, in the following month, with slightly different mixes. This release includes "The Sun", which is not available on future releases – it is one of the oldest songs written by the band's multi-instrumentalist and producer, Kevin Parker.

Parker later reflected on working with the Canyons duo, "They used to run a label which Tame Impala used to sort of be on. We released a 12" vinyl with them once, on one side it had three Tame Impala songs and on the other it was the same three songs remixed by Canyons and that was really cool, it was a really casual relationship."

== Track listing ==
All tracks are written by Kevin Parker.

Tame Impala (H.I.T.S. 003) track listing
No.	Title	Length
1.	"Half Full Glass of Wine"	4:26
2.	"Skeleton Tiger"	4:24
3.	"The Sun"	2:59
4.	"Half Full Glass of Wine" (Canyons Drunken Rage remix)	5:34
5.	"Skeleton Tiger" (Retamed by Canyons remix)	6:11
6.	"The Sun" (Fred Cherry Eclipse remix)	4:46
Total length:		28:20

== Personnel ==
- Kevin Parker – vocals and instrumentation on all tracks, except for:
- Dominic Simper – bass guitar on "The Sun"
- Jay Watson – drums and backing vocals on "The Sun"
