= Sundown Syndrome =

Single by Tame Impala
- B-side: "Remember Me"
- Released: 30 June 2009
- Recorded: March 2009
- Studio: Toe Rag Studios (London)
- Genre: Psychedelic rock
- Length: 5:50
- Label: Modular Recordings
- Songwriter: Kevin Parker
- Producers: Kevin Parker, Liam Watson

Tame Impala singles chronology
"Sundown Syndrome" (2009)	"Solitude Is Bliss" (2010)

"Sundown Syndrome" is the debut single by Tame Impala, released as a single in 2009. Its B-side was a cover of the Blue Boy song "Remember Me". The title "Sundown Syndrome" refers to a neurological phenomenon called sundowning.

== Composition ==
"Sundown Syndrome" was written by Kevin Parker in the key of E major in a mostly 6/8 time signature. It is based around the repeating chords of F♯m7 and G♯m7.

The song begins in 4/4 with the two above mentioned chords, while the drums are loose and jazzy and have flange added to them. It then changes to 6/8 time with a looser strumming pattern.

The verse comes soon after, with basic strums of the chords and occasional fills played on electric guitar. A kazoo then comes in, which some people mistook for a fuzz guitar, to play a solo in the E major scale over the same F♯m7, G♯m7 chord progression.

Another verse featuring the same previous structure, and another kazoo solo in the same E major scale return again. This gives way to a chorus using the barre chord progression of D♭ major, G♭ major, E major, B major, G♭ major and D♭ major. The chorus is in 6/8 time, but switches to one bar of 4/4 at the end of every chord progression, and four bars of 4/4 at the end of every chorus. Parker's vocals are heavily reverbed and delayed to give it a spacy atmosphere.

A bridge in 6/8 time comes next, with simple strums of the chords F♯m7, G♯m7, F♯m7, A major and E major. A heavily phased, jazzy guitar solo using the E major scale comes in over the F♯m7, G♯m7 chord progression.

The chorus comes back, and then a variation of the chorus barre chord progression on a phased guitar is played by itself, this time with just D♭ major, G♭ major and E major with occasional glissando slides between the chords. After a few bars of the guitar on its own, the chorus vocals come back over the top with occasional quiet bass fills. The chorus then comes back to its original form with the full band, and is extended longer than before.

The song ends the way it started, in 4/4 with the strumming of the F♯m7 and G♯m7 chords. A barred C♯ major chord with guitar feedback completely ends the song.

== Recording ==
Both "Sundown Syndrome" and "Remember Me" were recorded at Toe Rag Studios in London, UK with Liam Watson in March 2009. Parker later recalled "There was no-one really doing any producing, we just played [Sundown Syndrome] how it was destined to be played and then Liam recorded it and just did his thing. We just wanted to do the Toerag thing basically and it was a really awesome experience, the sound he gets at Toerag are amazing its like no other studio in the world both visually and sonically."

== Release ==
"Sundown Syndrome" was later featured on the soundtrack for 2010 film The Kids Are All Right and was also included on the Ministry of Sound compilation album Chillout Sessions XII. "Sundown Syndrome" and "Remember Me" were later re-released on the deluxe edition of Innerspeaker. "Remember Me" came in at number 78 in the Triple J Hottest 100 in 2009.

Sundown Syndrome Tour
- Tour by Tame Impala
- Promotional poster for Australian tour dates in 2009
- Location: Australia
- Start date: September 16, 2009
- End date: October 23, 2009
- No. of shows: 22
- Supporting act: Jonathan Boulet

Tame Impala concert chronology
- Sundown Syndrome Tour (2009); Innerspeaker Tour (2010–11)

== Tour ==
The Sundown Syndrome Tour was a concert tour in Australia by Tame Impala, the Australian psychedelic music project of Kevin Parker, in support of their single "Sundown Syndrome". The tour began on September 16, 2009, at Bizzo's in Sydney, and concluded on October 23, 2009 at the Corner Hotel in Melbourne. Tame Impala was supported by Jonathan Boulet. The tour was announced on July 22, 2009, with dates slated for September and October of that year.

=== Tour dates ===
List of 2009 concerts, showing date, city, country, and venue.
Date (2009)	City	Country	Venue
September 16	Caringbah	Australia	Bizzo's
September 17	Wollongong	Australia	Waves Nightclub
September 18	Canberra	Australia	Australian National University Bar & Refectory
September 19 (Note: The show on September 19, 2009 in Albury was part of Indie Music Festival 2009.)	Albury	Australia	Ettamogah Pub
September 24	Sydney	Australia	The Mona Vale Hotel
September 25	Sydney	Australia	Manning Bar
September 26	Newcastle	Australia	Cambridge Hotel
September 27	Coffs Harbour	Australia	Coffs Harbour Hotel
September 30	Byron Bay	Australia	Great Northern Hotel
October 1	Gold Coast	Australia	Coolangatta Hotel
October 2	Brisbane	Australia	The HiFi Bar
October 4	Maroochydore	Australia	Sands Tavern
October 8	Geraldton	Australia	Breakers Tavern
October 9	Fremantle	Australia	Fremantle Arts Centre
October 10	Bunbury	Australia	Prince of Wales Hotel
October 15	Hobart	Australia	Republic Bar & Café
October 16	Launceston	Australia	Hotel New York
October 17	Adelaide	Australia	The University of Adelaide UniBar
October 18	Mildura	Australia	Sandbar
October 21	Ballarat	Australia	Karova Lounge
October 22	Geelong	Australia	Eureka Hotel
October 23	Melbourne	Australia	Corner Hotel

=== Setlist ===
This setlist is from the October 23, 2009 concert in Melbourne. It does not represent all of the concerts for the duration of the tour.

1. "Sundown Syndrome"
2. "Desire Be Desire Go"
3. "Skeleton Tiger"
4. "Half Full Glass of Wine"
5. "Jeremy's Storm"
6. "The Bold Arrow of Time"
7. "Remember Me" (Blue Boy Cover)

=== Live band ===
- Kevin Parker – lead vocals, guitar
- Dominic Simper – bass guitar, guitar, synthesizer
- Jay Watson – drums, synthesiser, backing vocals
- Nick Allbrook – bass guitar, guitar, synthesiser

== Live performances ==
"Sundown Syndrome" was added to Tame Impala's set for the Sundown Syndrome Tour in 2009, and was played through 2010. In 2011, it was not performed as regularly. It was performed for the first time in several years at the Panorama festival in 2017. A performance of "Sundown Syndrome" was filmed for the 2009 Summer Sonic Festival, and a live version was later released on their live album Live at the Corner.

"Remember Me" has been performed as far back as 2008, and is still occasionally played as of 2011. It was added to their set with the addition of Jay Watson on drums because the song fit his drumming style. In 2010, Tame Impala incorporated a quiet outro where Parker loops his vocals and experiments with effects while Dominic Simper plays synth chords. Parker was an instant fan of the song when he saw a music video for it on Australian music television program Rage at the age of 11.

On October 31, 2025, "Sundown Syndrome" was played for the first time since 2018 for Tame Impala's Deadbeat Tour, which began on October 27, 2025, in support of the album "Deadbeat" . The band again performed the track at shows in Amsterdam, Frankfurt and Dublin as part of the European leg of the tour in 2026.

== Track listing ==
1. "Sundown Syndrome" – 5:50
2. "Remember Me" – 4:22
3. "Sundown Syndrome (Canyons Remix)" – 7:47 (Digital release only track)

== Personnel ==
- Kevin Parker – all vocals and instrumentation
