= Why Won't You Make Up Your Mind? =

Single by Tame Impala

from the album Innerspeaker
- Released: 30 January 2011
- Recorded: June–August, 2009; Wave House, Injidup, Western Australia
- Genre: Psychedelic rock
- Length: 3:19
- Label: Modular Recordings
- Songwriter: Kevin Parker
- Producer: Kevin Parker

Tame Impala singles chronology
| "Expectation" (2010) | "Why Won't You Make Up Your Mind?" (2011) | "Elephant" (2012) |

"Why Won't You Make Up Your Mind?" is a song by the Australian music project Tame Impala, released as a single in 2011. It was recorded during the sessions for the Innerspeaker album in 2009, and released as the fourth single from that album. The single features artwork from Australian artist Leif Podhajsky, who also created the artwork for Innerspeaker and the follow-up Lonerism.

== Composition ==
"Why Won't You Make Up Your Mind?" was written by Kevin Parker in the key of F major in a 4/4 time signature. It is based around four repeating barre chords of A minor, B-flat major, E minor and F major, played on electric guitar, to create a trance-like, hypnotic and spacious atmosphere, while the bass is played rhythmically to fill in the guitar spaces.

It starts with three hi-hat hits on the drums, which was included by Parker as a tribute to the Outkast song Hey Ya! which starts with an uncommon three upbeats, rather than the more common four upbeats. Before the verse starts, a pitch-shifted, delayed, fuzz guitar kicks in, which many mistook for a synth, to play a melody in the F major scale, featuring stereo panning effects to give it a sense of movement.

The verse starts, featuring Parker's vocals, which are reverbed and delayed. The lyrics are minimal and only featured in the verses, while a heavily chorused, distorted guitar plays a riff in the choruses.

Another verse comes in repeating the same lyrics, which gives way to a psychedelic outro, featuring many guitar overdubs with effects added to them coming to a crescendo. At only 3:19, "Why Won't You Make Up Your Mind?" is the shortest track on Innerspeaker.

== Music video ==
Frames from the unofficial Pitchfork music video for "Why Won't You Make Up Your Mind?", which was filmed in 3D

While an official music video was never made, Pitchfork Media created an unofficial video. It features the band playing a rendition of "Why Won't You Make Up Your Mind?" in a woodland. It was shot in 3D and features strong 3D effects and warbly images that make use of the extra dimension.

== Live performances ==
"Why Won't You Make Up Your Mind?" has featured in almost every single Tame Impala set since the release of Innerspeaker, and was later added to the beginning of the set in 2011, transitioning into "Alter Ego". Live, Parker occasionally incorporates a heavily reverbed, improvised guitar solo in the outro, using the F major scale.

It was performed on Late Night with Jimmy Fallon on the 12 August 2011 episode to an American audience of 3.6 million viewers, on Tame Impala's live television debut. Former bassist Nick Allbrook wasn't present for the performance when there was a delay in the delivery of his visa and was slow to get through customs. Tame Impala's guitar technician, Matt Handley, filled in for Allbrook on bass.

== Track listing ==
1. "Why Won't You Make Up Your Mind?" – 3:19
2. "Why Won't You Make Up Your Mind?" (Erol Alkan rework) – 8:14
3. "Why Won't You Make Up Your Mind?" (Erol Alkan instrumental) – 8:14
4. "Why Won't You Make Up Your Mind?" (Erol Alkan rework edit) – 4:15

== Personnel ==
- Kevin Parker – all vocals and instrumentation
