= Solitude Is Bliss =

Single by Tame Impala

from the album Innerspeaker
- Released: 1 April 2010
- Recorded: June–August 2009
- Studio: Wave House, Injidup, Western Australia
- Genre: Psychedelic rock; funk rock
- Length: 3:55
- Label: Modular
- Songwriter: Kevin Parker
- Producer: Kevin Parker

Tame Impala singles chronology
"Sundown Syndrome" (2009)	"Solitude Is Bliss" (2010)	"Lucidity" (2010)

"Solitude Is Bliss" is a song by Tame Impala, released as a single in April 2010. It was recorded during the sessions for the Innerspeaker album in 2009, and released as the first single from that album. The single features artwork from Australian artist Leif Podhajsky, who also created the artwork for Innerspeaker and the follow-up Lonerism. "Solitude Is Bliss" came in at number 33 in the Triple J Hottest 100 in 2010.

== Composition ==
"Solitude Is Bliss" was written by Kevin Parker in the key of F major in a 4/4 time signature. It is based around the barre chords of D major, C major, Fadd11 and Gadd11.

The song starts off with heavily phased strumming of the above-mentioned chords on an electric guitar. A drum fill comes crashing in to provide the rhythmic accompaniment along with the bass guitar. This gives way to the verses, which feature funky, heavily rhythmic picking of the root notes of D, E, G and A. The pre-chorus features the sustained chords of A major and B♭ major, with Parker's vocals jumping between the two stereo channels, due to the wide automatic double tracking.

The chorus then comes in featuring soaring vocals from Parker that have been heavily delayed and reverbed, featuring the same D major, C major, Fadd11, Gadd11 chord progression as the intro.

The verse, pre-chorus, chorus format returns again, as well as the rhythmic root note picking, before giving way to a key change to E♭ major, with the chord progression C major, B♭ major, A♭ major. Over the top of this progression, a phased guitar solo plays in the E♭ major scale.

After the solo, the bridge features a F major, B♭ major, A♭ major chord progression, with Parker's vocals over the top.

Another key change occurs, to E major, and the intro, chorus chord progression and strumming pattern is then transposed to the E major key, turning into a D♭ major, B major, Eadd11 progression.

The chorus comes back in, and the key changes back to F major, featuring the chorus repeated until the end of the song.

== Release ==
On 1 April 2010, "Solitude Is Bliss" was released as the first single from Tame Impala's 2010 debut album Innerspeaker. Parker explained the decision to release it as the lead single: "It was the most uplifting pop song. It’s the most sassy, confident sounding song. I like to think of it as coked up Tame Impala. It’s quite overconfident. You know, most of my lyrics aren’t as confident as that song. It’s almost arrogant I guess, but it is intended to be extremely confident because it’s about being alone and how confident you are when you’re alone." The meaning of the song is "how awesome it can be to be inside your own head, how peaceful and enlightening it can be; good for the soul." and "like bathing in the glory of being alone, like, 'How great is this? I'm alone!'"

== Music video ==
Frames from the music video for "Solitude Is Bliss", which represents the themes of the song

The music video for "Solitude Is Bliss" was directed by Megaforce in Kyiv, Ukraine. It features a man dancing around the carnage in an almost post-apocalyptic world where there are flaming cars and dead bodies in the streets, which is meant to represent the man's mind, post-shock. During the choruses, the man is transported back to the "real world" hustle and bustle and finds himself having to push and shove through crowds of people in suits.

The video took a bit of criticism for not fitting in with Tame Impala's psychedelic sound. Parker said "We really like how it's the opposite of what you expect... I kind of like to think of it as not the clip to the song, but if that scene was in a movie, then that song would be a really cool song to have over that scene."

== Track listing ==
1. "Solitude Is Bliss" – 3:55
2. "Solitude Is Bliss (Canyons "Dow Jones" Mix)" – 4:22
3. "Solitude Is Bliss (Midnight Juggernauts Remix)" – 4:55
4. "Solitude Is Bliss (Mickey Moonlight T.A.M. Remix)" – 3:49

== Personnel ==
- Kevin Parker – all vocals and instrumentation, except for:
- Jay Watson – drums

== Certifications ==
Region	Certification	Certified units/sales
Australia (ARIA)	Gold	35,000^{‡}
^{‡} Sales+streaming figures based on certification alone.

== Cover versions ==
- British band Mark Ronson & The Business Intl. covered this song for Triple Js 'Like a Version' segment
- Australian indie pop band San Cisco covered this song on their EP Golden Revolver
- Owl Eyes covered this song for Triple Js 'Like a Version'
