= Leif Podhajsky =

Australian graphic designer

- Born: Byron Bay, New South Wales, Australia
- Known for: Graphic design, album art
- Website: leifpodhajsky.com

Leif Podhajsky is an Australian graphic designer and art director, well known for his distinctive album art working with artists such as Tame Impala, Bonobo, Foals, Kylie Minogue, Of Monsters and Men, Lykke Li, Toy, The Horrors, Mount Kimbie, Kelis, London Grammar and Aurora.

Podhajsky has emerged as a promising photographer, with his brooding landscape photography attracting a large following through his popular Instagram and Facebook accounts. In addition to creating album art, has also created artwork for a number of record labels around the world, such as Warp Records, Modular Recordings, Sub Pop and Sony Music, with tour posters, T-shirts and other merchandise.

Podhajsky's work explores themes of connectedness, love, fear, magic, the relevance of nature and the psychedelic or altered experience, and uses techniques such as pattern, recursion, balance, symmetry and repetition. By utilizing these subjects he attempts to "coerce the viewer into a realignment with themselves and their surroundings".

== Tame Impala ==
Podhajsky has also worked with Australian psychedelic rock project Tame Impala on numerous occasions, creating art for his album Innerspeaker and its follow-up Lonerism, and also creating art for his singles "Solitude Is Bliss", "Lucidity", "Expectation", "Why Won't You Make Up Your Mind?", "Apocalypse Dreams" and "Elephant".

== Style ==
Podhajsky's work has been described as "striking abstractions of nature – mirrored vistas, engulfing waves, rippling, melting cosmic landscapes".

Conceptually, Podhajsky believes "the concepts I explore are universal to all humans and I believe we have lost touch with a lot of these in our modern lives. We're all secretly searching for answers to true happiness and contentment."

Podhajsky's personal philosophy on working with musical artists is "I try and work with artists who I respect - whose music I would want to listen to. A lot of albums that have my work on them are on solid rotation. Ideally I like to spend a lot of time with the music working out a story and concept which I can capture the whole albums feel and flow." Podhajsky also uses album art to "create one image which encompasses an entire album of story and emotion".

Music also inspires Podhajsky in "not just work for record labels or bands, but across everything I do. I find it helps me turn the part of my brain that over analyses and makes things logical switch off. This helps as it lets me form compositions in a more natural and fluid way, so it felt really organic to begin creating artwork for musicians. I have always loved album art and think it can really add to the whole experience of an album."
