= Expectation (song) =

Single by Tame Impala

from the album Innerspeaker
- Released: 3 December 2010
- Recorded: June–August, 2009; Wave House, Injidup, Western Australia
- Genre: Psychedelic rock; progressive rock
- Length: 6:02
- Label: Modular Recordings
- Songwriter: Kevin Parker
- Producer: Kevin Parker

Tame Impala singles chronology
"Lucidity" (2010)	"Expectation" (2010)	"Why Won't You Make Up Your Mind?" (2011)

"Expectation" is a song by Tame Impala, released as a single in 2010. It was recorded during the sessions for the Innerspeaker album in 2009, and released as the third single from that album. The single features artwork from Australian artist Leif Podhajsky, who also created the artwork for Innerspeaker and the follow-up Lonerism.

== Composition ==
"Expectation" was written by Kevin Parker in the key of C major in a 6/4 time signature. It is based around the two repeating chords of Cmaj7 and Fmaj7.

The song starts off in a polymeter rhythm, with 3/4 on the drums, and 6/8 on the guitar, bass and keyboard. The vocals have reverb and delay applied to them, and the guitars are distorted through a flanger pedal. The verse features a slight call and response type effect where Parker's vocals come in over the top of the drums and bass, and then when the vocals stop they are replaced by the guitar over the top of the drums and bass. During the guitar sections in the verse, there is also a heavily flanged guitar low in the mix playing a melody in the F major scale.

Another verse comes in over the top of the pre-verse instrumental section. The pre-chorus is short and features an F5 power chord played on guitar to punctuate the lyrics. There is also a short bass fill, as well as a synth fill.

The chorus then comes in, featuring a chord progression of A minor, E minor, Fmaj7, Cmaj7, G major, Fmaj7. The oscillating, echoed vocals from the chorus filter into the next section, with the guitar from the intro played in 4/4. The song then returns to 3/4 with the regular strumming pattern returning again. A flanged backward guitar overdub is also included.

This gives way to the bridge, which has a key change to G minor, with the repetitive chords of G minor and C major. Additional reverb and delay on Parker's vocals are used to provide a hazy atmosphere.

The key returns to C major in the next verse. It has the same Cmaj7 and Fmaj7 chord progression once again. The pre-chorus is extended for a few extra bars this time, and includes an Fmaj7 chord in addition to the F major of the previous pre-chorus.

A synth fill transitions to the chorus, but this time it only has a synth playing the chorus chord progression behind Parker's delayed vocals, which have had the delay time shortened and the feedback amount extended. The full band then comes back in to play the chorus a couple of times more before the song completely fades out at 4:24.

At 4:30, the song fades back in for a reprise of the bridge, with an extremely flanged guitar playing the G minor, C major chord progression in the key of G minor. The drums and bass soon follow the guitar, with the bass playing the vocal melody from the lyric "In all of the universe, there is nobody for me" using the G minor scale. The drums slowly start building and the song eventually comes to a crescendo with layered guitar overdubs and synths. The song then suddenly stops with a soft synth fading out a second after the band do.

== Music video ==
Frames from the music video for "Expectation", displaying the use of the 360-degree camera

The music video for "Expectation" was directed by Clemens Habicht. It was shot in autumn in a forest in Saint-Cloud, France, using a 360 degree camera.

The video begins with Tame Impala walking into position and picking up their instruments. They perform the song in a circle around the camera, and then the image is flattened onto the frame, creating a panoramic effect, making it appear as if they are standing right next to each other. This creates a wobbly and distorted image around the corners of the frame. The camera then pans to the side and the image infinitely continues on the other side, à la Pac-Man. There are also shots with different panning patterns, such as in a figure 8.

After the first chorus, it cuts to a shot at night-time, with various members of the band walking around the camera and therefore continuing on the other side of the frame. There are also shots of them performing the song in the dimly lit forest, and other shots where they are letting off flares, creating a bright red haze in the dark forest as the band plays. This scene also features an almost hand-held camera effect with the camera zooming in up close and then crossing to other members of the band, bending the image in the process. The outro features heavy psychedelic panning effects, to create a dizzying and disorienting effect. The song finishes and the band put down their instruments and walk away.

According to Parker, they spent the whole day filming it and did approximately 37 takes. The video only features the main portion of the song, and doesn't include the instrumental reprise.

== Live performances ==
"Expectation" was added to Tame Impala's setlist in late 2010 and heavily featured in 2011. Live, Tame Impala play the entire song, including the reprise, and have a heavier use of effects in the reprise.

== Track listing ==
1. "Expectation" – 6:02

== Personnel ==
- Kevin Parker – all vocals and instrumentation
