= On the Bright Side Festival =

Annual music festival in Perth, Australia

On The Bright Side
- Genre: Rock, Electronic, Alternative, Punk, Post-Dubstep, Britpop, Folk Garage Rock
- Dates: Late July
- Locations: The Esplanade, Perth, Western Australia
- Years active: 2010 - 2011
- Website: http://onthebrightside.com.au

On The Bright Side is an annual Australian music festival held in Perth, Western Australia. Starting in 2010, the event is the result of collaboration between the promoters of Splendour in the Grass Festival held in Woodford, Queensland and Rock-It held in Joondalup, Western Australia.

The event is held under the supertop at Esplanade Park in Perth during July and in its first two years proved to be one of the highlights of the Perth winter music calendar.

In 2012, the festival was cancelled due to "conflicting artist schedules". Despite a promise to return in 2013 there was no such announcement from the festival.

== Artist lineups by year ==
=== 2010 ===
- The Strokes
- Mumford & Sons
- Angus & Julia Stone
- Band Of Horses
- Hot Chip
- The Middle East
- Bluejuice
- Art vs. Science

The Ting Tings were originally announced to play in 2010 but had to pull out due to rescheduling the release of their second album. Their replacement on the bill was Art vs. Science.

=== 2011 ===
- The Hives
- Pulp
- Modest Mouse
- Tame Impala
- The Kills
- The Grates
- Foster the People
- James Blake
- Warpaint
- Tim & Jean

=== 2012 ===
The festival was cancelled in 2012 due to "conflicting artist schedules".
