= Lucidity (song) =

Single by Tame Impala

from the album Innerspeaker
- Released: July 2010
- Recorded: June–August and December, 2009; Wave House, Injidup, Western Australia; Tarbox Road Studio, Cassadaga, New York
- Genre: Psychedelic rock
- Length: 4:31
- Label: Modular Recordings
- Songwriter: Kevin Parker
- Producer: Kevin Parker

Tame Impala singles chronology
"Solitude Is Bliss" (2010)	"Lucidity" (2010)	"Expectation" (2010)

"Lucidity" is a song by Tame Impala, released as a single in 2010. It was recorded during the sessions for the Innerspeaker album in 2009, and released as the second single from that album. The single features artwork from Australian artist Leif Podhajsky, who also created the artwork for Innerspeaker and the follow-up Lonerism. "Lucidity" came in at number 74 in the Triple J Hottest 100 in 2010.

== Composition ==
"Lucidity" was written by Kevin Parker in the key of A major in a 4/4 time signature.

The verses feature heavily rhythmic strumming of the chords E7sus4add9 and E major. The pre-chorus features a variation of the verse vocal melody played on a fuzz guitar in the A major scale four times, before the verse rhythm plays one more time.

The chorus then comes in with a key change to G major, and a B major, Dmaj7, A major, G major barre chord progression. After the chorus, it switches back to the key of A major and there is a short arpeggio from C major to D major chords to connect to the next verse.

The second verse is half the length of the first one, and a short guitar solo in the A major scale comes in on the words "float away".

The chorus, connecting guitar lick, pre-chorus, chorus format comes in at this point and then a bridge occurs. The bridge switches to the key of G major again and features the chords F♯ major, G major, A major and B major played at a slower tempo.

The bridge fizzles out, then it switches back to the A major key, and a scorching fuzz guitar solo over the verse chords and rhythm comes in, with heavy unison bends and whammy bar vibrato. The song then ends with fuzz pedal noise.

== Recording ==
The instrumentals for "Lucidity" were recorded during the sessions for Innerspeaker in June to August 2009. The lyrics and vocals weren't recorded until the mixing stage of the album in December 2009, at Dave Fridmann's Tarbox Road Studio in Cassadaga, New York, which Parker later recalled: "I was thinking, 'We're going to be mixing this song in the next six hours'. I hadn't done any vocals and I didn't have any lyrics; I was literally losing my brain. I'd stop, sit outside in the snow and try to think of lyrics."

== Music video ==
Frames from the music video for "Lucidity", which shows its launching point, the height it reaches, the curvature of the Earth and the eagle inspecting the camera

The music video for "Lucidity" was directed by Robert Hales. The video was filmed with a camera attached to a weather balloon outside of Mildura in Victoria, Australia.

Parker starts the video by letting go of the camera attached to the weather balloon and letting it float away. The whole video is the same shot of the camera filming down below on a bird's-eye view as it floats up into the sky. The balloon eventually exits the Earth's atmosphere and into space, where you can see the curvature of the Earth and some shots of the Sun. The camera then comes crashing down back to Earth during the fuzz guitar solo section of the song. The video ends with an eagle coming to inspect the camera.

Despite the fact that the band is only seen for a couple of seconds, the director got Tame Impala to mime the whole song. They had practiced the song for two days beforehand. Some shots of them miming the song can be seen in the behind the scenes video.

== Live performances ==
Live, Tame Impala play "Lucidity" two semitones lower than the recorded version, switching to the keys of G major and F major, although in 2012 they have returned the song back to its originally recorded keys. "Lucidity" hasn't been a regular song in Tame Impala's set, but has been played throughout 2010 and 2011, with many experiments with the structure of the song, with it sometimes played in an uptempo danceable fashion and sometimes featuring an almost drone out ending during the bridge. Parker also experiments with different effects during the outro solo. In 2012 "Lucidity" was again added to Tame Impala's setlist.

== Track listing ==
1. "Lucidity" – 4:31
2. "Lucidity (Pilooski Remix) – 5:29

== Personnel ==
- Kevin Parker – all vocals and instrumentation
- Tansie Bennetts – hand claps
