= Tame Impala (EP) =

EP by Tame Impala
- Released: 11 October 2008
- Genre: Psychedelic rock
- Length: 20:41 (25:53)
- Label: Modular
- Producer: Kevin Parker

Tame Impala chronology
Tame Impala H.I.T.S. 003 (2008)	Tame Impala (2008)	Live at the Corner (2010)

Singles from Tame Impala
- 1. "Desire Be Desire Go"; 2. "Half Full Glass of Wine"; 3. "Skeleton Tiger"

Tame Impala is the second extended play (EP) by Australian musical project Tame Impala, released on 11 October 2008 by Modular Recordings. It reached number 1 on the Australian Independent Record Labels (AIR) Chart and number 10 on the ARIA Physical Singles Chart. Three singles were released from the EP: "Desire Be Desire Go", "Half Full Glass of Wine" and "Skeleton Tiger". All three received national radio airplay on the Triple J network. "Half Full Glass of Wine" reached number 75 on the Triple J Hottest 100. The song is also featured on the Hottest 100 compilation CD/DVD. It was reissued in 2013 as part of the Record Store Day with the track "Wander" making its first appearance on vinyl.

== Recording ==
The songs on the EP were selected from a list of approximately 20 songs that Kevin Parker had recorded as far back as 2003, which he had sent to their label Modular Recordings. Speaking about the EP release Parker said "Most of the songs on the EP were never meant to be heard by the rest of Perth, let alone the rest of the world. They were just recorded for my own listening sake, and burning a CD of it and putting it in my car and giving it to my friends." Parker also revealed that "the EP was not in any way recorded for an EP. The songs that were on the EP weren’t even recorded at the same time, they were done over a bunch of years."

== Artwork ==
Kevin Parker's original artwork caused some confusion with the EP title and many believed it to be called Antares Mira Sun. The artwork is an interpretation of a slide he saw in an astronomy lecture, which demonstrated the difference in size between the stars Antares, Mira and the Sun. "The cover art is meant to be a painting; an interpretation of a diagram, so those labels are just there to make the diagram make sense. But lo and behold, there were reviews coming out saying "And Tame Impala's new EP Antares, Mira, Sun.""

== Track listing ==
All tracks are written by Kevin Parker.

No.	Title	Length
1.	"Desire Be Desire Go"	4:10
2.	"Skeleton Tiger"	4:25
3.	"Half Full Glass of Wine"	4:26
4.	"Forty One Mosquitoes Flying in Formation"	4:18
5.	"Slide Through My Fingers"	3:20
6.	"Wander" (iTunes bonus track)	5:10
Total length:		20:41 (25:54)

== Personnel ==
- Kevin Parker – vocals and instrumentation on all tracks, except for:
- Jay Watson – keyboards on "Forty One Mosquitoes Flying in Formation"; drums and backing vocals on "Wander" (iTunes bonus track)

Production

- Kevin Parker – producer, mixing and artwork
- Mandy Parnell – mastering
- Greg Moore – mastering (12" vinyl edition)

== Charts ==
Chart performance for Tame Impala
Chart (2008)	Peak position
Australia (ARIA)	82
