= Pukkelpop 2010 =

Music festival in Belgium

Pukkelpop 2010 ran from August 19 until August 21, 2010 in the Belgian village of Kiewit.

2010 Pukkelpop logo (25th anniversary)

== Line-up ==
=== Day 1: Thursday, August 19 ===
Main Stage	Marquee	Dance Hall
Placebo; Iron Maiden; Blink-182; The Kooks; Seasick Steve; De Jeugd van Tegenwoordig; Thrice	The Flaming Lips; Mark Lanegan; Goldfrapp; Band of Horses; Black Rebel Motorcycle Club; All Time Low; Ellie Goulding; We Are Scientists; Blue October	Groove Armada; Laurent Garnier; Kelis; Chase & Status; Shameboy; Jamaica; Tinie Tempah; I Blame Coco

=== Day 2: Friday, August 20 ===
Main Stage	Marquee	Dance Hall
Snow Patrol; The Prodigy; Eels; Limp Bizkit; Bloody Beetroots DJ Set; White Lies; Kate Nash; The Cribs; 3OH!3	The xx; Kele; Mumford and Sons; Foals; Henry Rollins Spoken Word; The Black Box Revelation; Blood Red Shoes; Matt & Kim; Funeral Party	Richie Hawtin presents Plastikman Live; Deadmau5; Major Lazer; Magnetic Man; Hot Chip; Ou Est Le Swimming Pool; We Have Band; Jack Parow

=== Day 3: Saturday, August 21 ===
Main Stage	Marquee	Dance Hall
Queens of the Stone Age; 2manydjs; Serj Tankian; Gogol Bordello; OK Go; Ash; Selah Sue	Jónsi; The National; The Drums; Broken Bells; The Low Anthem; Alain Johannes; Surfer Blood; Wallis Bird	Soulwax; Pendulum; Goose; Proxy; Die Antwoord; Uffie; Dominique Young Unique
