= Remember Me (Blue Boy song) =

1997 single by Blue Boy

Single by Blue Boy
- Released: 20 January 1997
- Genre: Dance; funk
- Label: Pharm
- Songwriters: Lex Blackmore; Robert Miller; Richard Evans; Marlena Shaw
- Producer: Lex Blackmore

Blue Boy singles chronology
"It's Up to You" (1996)	"Remember Me" (1997)	"Sandman" (1997)

Music video
- "Remember Me" on YouTube

"Remember Me" is a song by British DJ Alexis "Lex" Blackmore under his pseudonym Blue Boy. It was first included on his 1996 extended play (EP), Scattered Emotions. In January 1997, the track was released as a standalone single with original and remixed versions. Built around samples performed by American singer Marlena Shaw, the song peaked at No. 8 on the UK Singles Chart in February 1997 and No. 2 on the US Billboard Dance Club Play chart. It was a top-10 hit in Denmark, Finland, Iceland, Ireland, Israel, Norway, Spain, Sweden and Switzerland. On the Eurochart Hot 100, the track reached No. 13.

== Background ==
The track originally appeared on Mark Farina's remix album Mushroom Jazz Volume One. Jive Records acquired it and earmarked it for single release. The radio edit was remixed by Sure Is Pure, who were also responsible for a couple of top 20 remixes of Sister Sledge songs in 1993, released on the duo's Pharm sublabel imprint.

"Remember Me" is built around samples from "Woman of the Ghetto" by American jazz, blues and soul singer Marlena Shaw: "Remember me? I'm the one who had your babies" came from a live version, whereas the "ging, gi-gi-gi-gi-ging..." sample repeated throughout the song is the scat portion of the original song's refrain. Shaw had the following to say about it:

When it first happened, and the Mushroom Jazz people contacted me from San Francisco, I was kind of excited about it. But then, once I actually HEARD it, my first reaction was 'Oh my goodness! How in the world can I possibly stand onstage and sing those same notes, and those same lyrics, over and over again?'! You know, 'I'm the one who had your babies - ha-ha-ha-ha'! I mean, it's different when it's being recorded and you're just pushing the button! But then, once I got used to the idea, I became excited all over again! And actually several other people have sampled the song since, though with them it's been the onstage version I did on the (1973-released) 'Live At Montreux' album that seems to have got more attention - I guess because it was more spontaneous. Which, as I say, is something that HAPPENS in my live performances! And I particularly liked the St. Germain version, which had more of a jazz flavour to it.

== Critical reception ==
Larry Flick from Billboard magazine described the song as a "wickedly catchy dance anthem", noting further that "while the groove is appropriately aggressive and street-credible, the song is iced with accessible keyboards, and a loopy hook takes up permanent residence in the brain upon impact." Australian music channel Max included "Remember Me" in their list of "1000 Greatest Songs of All Time" in 2012. In 1996, Andy Beevers from Music Week's RM Dance Update wrote that it is "wooing the jazz and funk crowd", placing a Marlena Shaw classic "over a very basic but very bouncy funk rhythm. It's blindingly simple, dead cheeky and undeniably effective". Later, in 1997, another editor James Hyman rated it five out of five, calling it a "ridiculously simple and thus ultra-catchy funker". He added that the samples "and the subsequent 'Remember me, I'm the one who had your babies' hook added to a sparse hip hop break and a gently throbbing bassline not only recalls another classic—the Young Disciples' 'Apparently Nothin'—but commands an instant top 10 chart placing."

== Chart performance ==
In Europe, "Remember Me" was a top-10 hit in Denmark, Finland, Iceland, Ireland, Norway, Spain, Sweden, Switzerland and the United Kingdom. In the UK, the single peaked at No. 8 during its third week on the UK Singles Chart, on 9 February 1997. It also reached the top spot on both the UK Dance and UK R&B singles charts. Additionally, "Remember Me" was a top-20 hit in Belgium, France, Germany, Italy and the Netherlands, as well as on the Eurochart Hot 100, where it peaked at No. 13 in June 1997. Outside Europe, it reached No. 2 on the US Billboard Dance Club Play chart and in Israel, number six on Canada's RPM Dance chart and No. 17 in Australia. The single was awarded with a gold record in Australia and the UK.

== Track listings ==
- UK CD single
1. "Remember Me" (Sure Is Pure 7-inch edit)
2. "Remember Me" (original 12-inch)
3. "Remember Me" (Sure Is Pure 12-inch remix)
4. "Remember Me" (Cavern 3 remix)
5. "Remember Me" (Rae and Christian remix)
- UK 12-inch single

A1. "Remember Me" (Sure Is Pure 7-inch edit)
A2. "Remember Me" (Sure Is Pure 12-inch remix)
B1. "Remember Me" (original 12-inch)
B2. "Remember Me" (Rae and Christian remix)

- UK cassette single
1. "Remember Me" (Sure Is Pure 7-inch edit)
2. "Remember Me" (original 12-inch)
- European maxi-CD single
1. "Remember Me" (Sure Is Pure 7-inch edit)
2. "Remember Me" (original 7-inch edit)
3. "Remember Me" (Deep Zone club mix)
4. "Remember Me" (Dub Zone)
5. "Remember Me" (Sure Is Pure 12-inch remix)
6. "Remember Me" (original 12-inch)
7. "Remember Me" (Sub dub)
- European 12-inch single

A1. "Remember Me" (Deep Zone club mix)
A2. "Remember Me" (Dub Zone)
B1. "Remember Me" (Sure Is Pure 12-inch remix)
B2. "Remember Me" (original 12-inch)

- US CD single
1. "Remember Me" (radio edit)
2. "Remember Me" (12-inch remix)
3. "Remember Me" (original mix)
- US maxi-CD single
1. "Remember Me" (Sure Is Pure radio edit) – 3:49
2. "Remember Me" (Deep Zone club mix) – 7:27
3. "Remember Me" (Mad House vocal mix) – 3:51
4. "Remember Me" (original 12-inch) – 7:02
5. "Remember Me" (Da Ill Flip remix) – 6:47
6. Mushroom Jazz sampler – 5:05
- US 12-inch single

A1. "Remember Me" (Deep Zone club mix)
A2. "Remember Me" (Sub dub)
B1. "Remember Me" (Sure Is Pure 7-inch)
B2. "Remember Me" (Pimplab mix)
B3. "Remember Me" (Da Ill Flip mix)

- Australian and New Zealand CD single
1. "Remember Me" (original edit) – 3:59
2. "Remember Me" (original 12-inch) – 7:04
3. "Remember Me" (Mad House vocal mix) – 5:11
4. "Remember Me" (Sure Is Pure mix 1) – 10:46
5. "Remember Me" (Sure Is Pure mix 2) – 10:26
6. "Remember Me" (Marc Rae mix) – 6:56

== Charts ==
=== Weekly charts ===
Chart (1997)	Peak position
Australia (ARIA)	17
Austria (Ö3 Austria Top 40)	21
Belgium (Ultratop 50 Flanders)	12
Belgium (Ultratop 50 Wallonia)	17
Canada Dance/Urban (RPM)	6
Denmark (IFPI)	4
Europe (Eurochart Hot 100)	13
Finland (Suomen virallinen lista)	5
France (SNEP)	17
Germany (GfK)	18
Iceland (Íslenski Listinn Topp 40)	2
Ireland (IRMA)	6
Israel (Israeli Singles Chart)	2
Italy (Musica e dischi / FIMI)	18
Italy Airplay (Music & Media)	7
Netherlands (Dutch Top 40)	13
Netherlands (Single Top 100)	17
Norway (VG-lista)	4
Scottish Singles Sales (Official Charts)	8
Spain (AFYVE)	4
Sweden (Sverigetopplistan)	8
Switzerland (Schweizer Hitparade)	4
UK Singles (Official Charts)	8
UK Dance (Official Charts)	1
UK Hip Hop/R&B (Official Charts)	1
US Dance Club Play (Billboard)	2
US Maxi-Singles Sales (Billboard)	27

=== Year-end charts ===
Chart (1997)	Rank
Australia (ARIA)	71
Belgium (Ultratop 50 Flanders)	66
Belgium (Ultratop 50 Wallonia)	81
Europe (Eurochart Hot 100)	44
Germany (Media Control)	77
Iceland (Íslenski Listinn Topp 40)	37
Netherlands (Dutch Top 40)	93
Romania (Romanian Top 100)	62
Sweden (Topplistan)	66
Switzerland (Schweizer Hitparade)	26
UK Singles (OCC)	44
US Dance Club Play (Billboard)	36

== Certifications ==
Region	Certification	Certified units/sales
Australia (ARIA)	Gold	35,000^{^}
United Kingdom (BPI)	Gold	400,000^{‡}
^{^} Shipments figures based on certification alone.^{‡} Sales+streaming figures based on certification alone.

== Cover versions and sampling ==
In late 2008, the Australian psychedelic rock band Tame Impala started performing this song as part of their live sets, eventually recording a cover version of it as a B-side to the "Sundown Syndrome" single. This cover became quite popular in Australia, reaching No. 78 on the Triple J Hottest 100, 2009.

In November 2012, British musician Daley sampled this song for his own composition "Remember Me", with the refrain sung by Jessie J.

In 2013, South African group Goldfish sampled the song for their track "Three Second Memory". TheSouthAfrican.com said of the song: "Where to start? Obviously the title track, which takes the vocal sample "Remember Me" and builds around it to a level which justifies its standing as the basis of the album."

In 2024, Puma sampled the song for its "FOREVER. FASTER" world-wide campaign (the first in 10 years for the German company).
