= Blue Boy (DJ) =

Scottish DJ

Blue Boy (also styled The Blue Boy) is a pseudonym for the Scottish DJ Alexis 'Lex' Blackmore. He is best known for "Remember Me", which peaked at No. 8 in the UK in 1997. Blackmore first worked as a DJ in Glasgow and London, touring with the British electronic group the Shamen in 1991. After working in various guises, Blackmore established the Blue Boy name in 1995 with the single "Sandman" on Ascension Records, followed by the four-track EP, Scattered Emotions.

A re-release of "Sandman" in August 1997 reached No. 25 on the UK Singles Chart.

== Discography ==
=== Singles ===
Date	Title	Chart Positions									
Date	Title	UK	AUS	FR	GER	IRE	NED	SPA	SWE	SWI	US (Dance)
1995	"Sandman"	—	—	—	—	—	—	—	—	—	—
1996	"It's Up to You"	—	—	—	—	—	—	—	—	—	—
1997	"Remember Me"	8	17	17	18	6	17	4	8	4	2
1997	"Sandman" (re-release)	25	63	—	—	—	—	—	—	—	—
"—" denotes releases that did not chart or were not released to that territory

=== EPs ===
- Scattered Emotions EP (1996), Guidance Recordings
