= Half Full Glass of Wine =

2008 song by Tame Impala

Song by Tame Impala

from the album Tame Impala EP
- Released: 11 October 2008
- Genre: Psychedelic rock; acid rock
- Length: 4:26
- Label: Modular
- Songwriter: Kevin Parker
- Producer: Kevin Parker

"Half Full Glass of Wine" is a song by Tame Impala, the psychedelic rock project of Australian musician Kevin Parker. It was released in 2008 on his self-titled second EP under the moniker. The song was later featured in the end credits for the show Entourage, season 7, episode 3 on July 18, 2010. "Half Full Glass of Wine" came in at number 75 in the Triple J Hottest 100 in 2008.

== Composition ==
"Half Full Glass of Wine" was written by Kevin Parker in the key of C minor in a 4/4 time signature.

It begins with hi-hats setting the tempo and rhythm, before an overdriven electric guitar riff comes in. The tempo is then gradually slowed down, ritenuto. The main guitar riff then comes in, which is a C minor pentatonic blues riff, and the bass guitar doubles it.

The first verse features a call and response effect where the vocals are backed only by a bass guitar rhythmically playing the C root note. After the vocal line, the full band come in and play the first half of the guitar riff. This happens two times, and then the next line has a variation of the main guitar riff, played higher on the fretboard after the vocal line is sung. The last vocal line of the verse is backed by loud strumming of an F^{5} power chord.

The pre-chorus has the first part of the main riff played again, and then it goes quiet with the bass rhythmically playing the C root note and quiet drums keeping time with Parker's vocals over the top. The F^{5} power chord comes back again and the main riff is played twice.

The chorus has an almost 12 bar blues structure, but put into a rock context, using G^{5}, F^{5} and B♭^{5} power chords.

The verse, pre-chorus, chorus format returns once again, with the pre-chorus extended with quiet guitar fills in the background.

A bridge comes in with a C^{5}, E♭^{5}, B♭^{5}, G^{5} power chord progression. After a few repeats, a simple guitar solo in the C minor pentatonic scale is played over the top, then the band stops and an extended drum solo is played in the outro before trailing off.

== Music video ==
Frames from the music video for "Half Full Glass of Wine"

The music video for "Half Full Glass of Wine" was made by New Zealand studio Special Problems. It features shots of the band that have been edited into various colourful and psychedelic animated sequences.

== Live performances ==
"Half Full Glass of Wine" has been played since 2008, and was a staple of their set.

Live, Tame Impala extend the song to more than twice its original length (sometimes even going to over 12 minutes) and include extensive improvised jamming in the middle of the song between the second chorus and bridge, and recently have turned the jam into a space rock section with experimentation with effects pedal and guitar tones.

== Certifications ==
Region	Certification	Certified units/sales
Australia (ARIA)	Gold	35,000^{‡}
^{‡} Sales+streaming figures based on certification alone.

== Personnel ==
- Kevin Parker – all vocals and instrumentation
