= Tame Impala =

Australian psychedelic music project

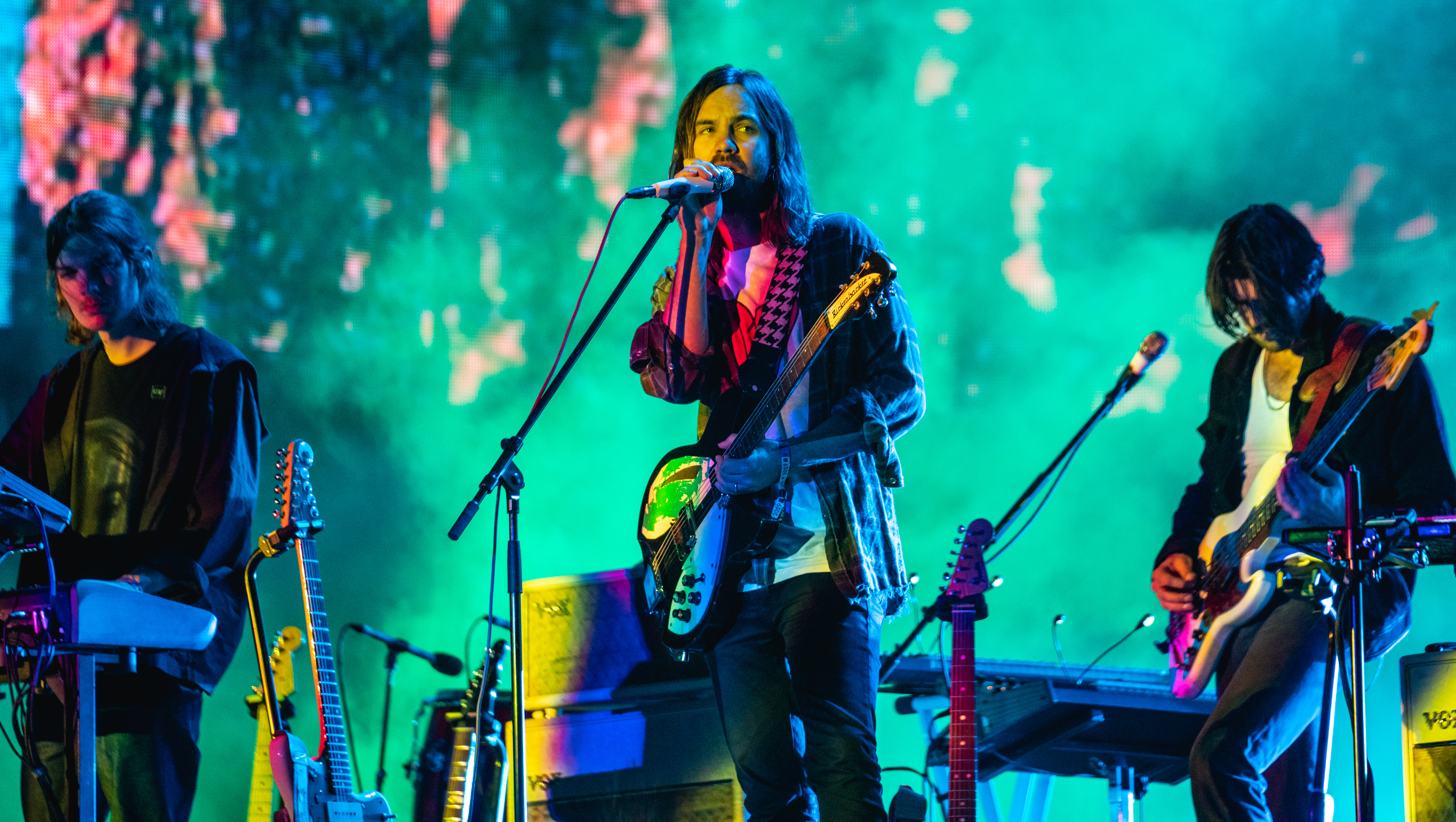
- Parker performing in 2019 at Flow Festival with members of the Tame Impala live band

Background information
- Origin: Perth, Western Australia, Australia
- Genres: Psychedelic pop; psychedelic rock; indie rock; synth-pop; neo-psychedelia; electronic
- Works: Discography
- Years active: 2007–present
- Labels: Sony; Modular; Interscope; Fiction; Island Australia; Caroline; Columbia
- Spinoffs: Pond
- Members: Kevin Parker; (see touring members)
- Website: tameimpala.com

Tame Impala (/ˈteɪm ɪmˈpɑːlə/ TAYM im-PAHL-ə) is the psychedelic music project of Australian singer and multi-instrumentalist Kevin Parker. In the recording studio, Parker writes, records, performs, and produces the project's music. As a touring act, Tame Impala consists of Parker (vocals, guitar, synthesiser), Dominic Simper (guitar, synthesiser), Jay Watson (synthesiser, vocals, guitar), Cam Avery (bass guitar, vocals, synthesiser), Julien Barbagallo (drums, vocals), and James Ireland (guitar, synthesiser). The group has a close affiliation with fellow Australian psychedelic rock band Pond, sharing members and collaborators, including Watson, Ireland, and formerly Nick Allbrook. Originally signed to Modular Recordings, Tame Impala signed in 2015 to Interscope Records in the United States and Fiction Records in the United Kingdom.

Parker originally conceived the project in Perth in 2007. After a series of singles and EPs, Tame Impala's debut studio album, Innerspeaker, was released in 2010; it was certified gold in Australia and well received by critics. Parker's 2012 follow-up, Lonerism, was also acclaimed, reaching platinum status in Australia and receiving a Grammy Award nomination for Best Alternative Music Album.

Tame Impala's third album, Currents, was released in July 2015 and like its predecessor, it won ARIA Awards for Best Rock Album and Album of the Year. Parker won the APRA Award for Song of the Year 2016 for Currents' first track, "Let It Happen". The fourth studio album, The Slow Rush, was released on 14 February 2020 to further praise from music critics. At the 2020 ARIA Music Awards, Tame Impala won five awards. The project's fifth album, Deadbeat, was released in 2025 to polarized reviews, and spawned the commercially successful single "Dracula"; its remix with South Korean singer Jennie (of Blackpink) became the project's first top-ten hit on the US Billboard Hot 100.

== History ==
=== 2007–2008: Early career ===
The origins of Tame Impala can be found in the Perth music scene. Musician Kevin Parker played in a number of bands, one being the Dee Dee Dums, a rock duo that consisted of Parker (guitar) and Luke Epstein (drums). Tame Impala emerged in 2007 as a home-recording project created by Parker, who posted a number of tracks on Myspace. This generated interest from a number of labels, and eventually he signed a worldwide deal with the independent Modular Recordings in July 2008. To transfer these recordings to a live setting, Parker enlisted the help of Dominic Simper (bass) and Jay Watson (drums), and they began playing at local gigs. Kevin Parker came up with the name of the band as a reflection of the music's theme. He felt the name encapsulated a balance between untamed creativity and refined artistry.

=== 2008–2009: Tame Impala EP ===
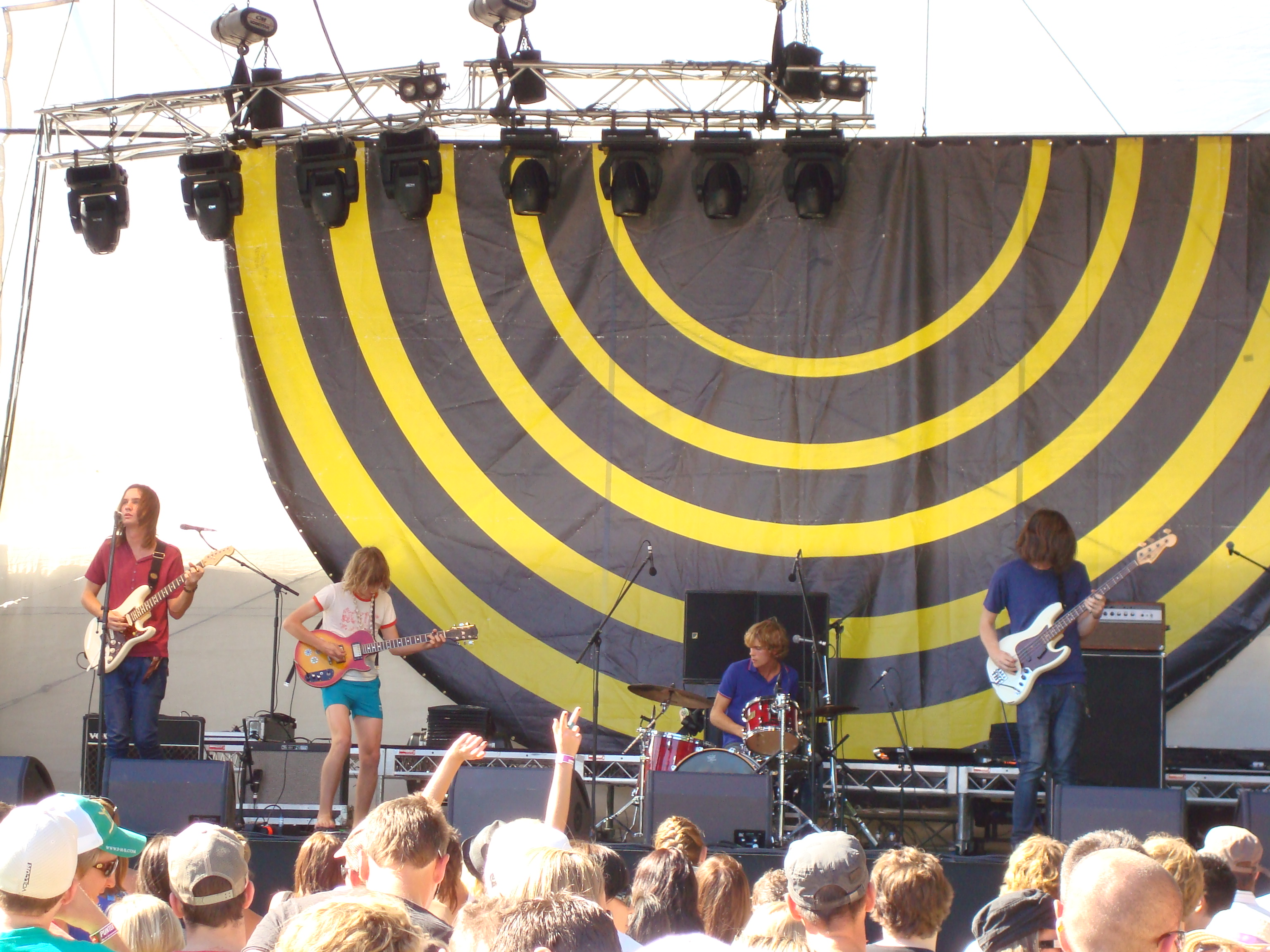
Tame Impala performing at the 2009 V Festival in Perth, Western Australia. From left to right: Kevin Parker, Nick Allbrook, Jay Watson, Dominic Simper.

The signing to Modular was soon followed by the release of Tame Impala's self-titled EP in September 2008. It reached the number 1 position on the Australian Independent Record Labels (AIR) Chart and number 10 on the ARIA Physical Singles Chart, with three songs—"Desire Be, Desire Go", "Half Full Glass of Wine", and "Skeleton Tiger"—receiving national radio airplay on the Triple J radio station.

Tame Impala's tours in 2008 included support for You Am I, the Black Keys, Yeasayer and MGMT, as well as performances at Southbound Festival, Meredith Music Festival, and Falls Festival, and national headline tours in support of their EP. Tours in 2009 included a sold-out six-date "Skeleton Tiger" national headline tour and a five-date UK tour (including Nevereverland UK), as well as performances at V Festival.

Tame Impala appeared on Triple J's Hottest 100 list in 2008—their first appearance on the list—with "Half Full Glass of Wine" at number 75. The song also appeared on the Hottest 100 compilation album.

=== 2009–2010: "Sundown Syndrome" ===
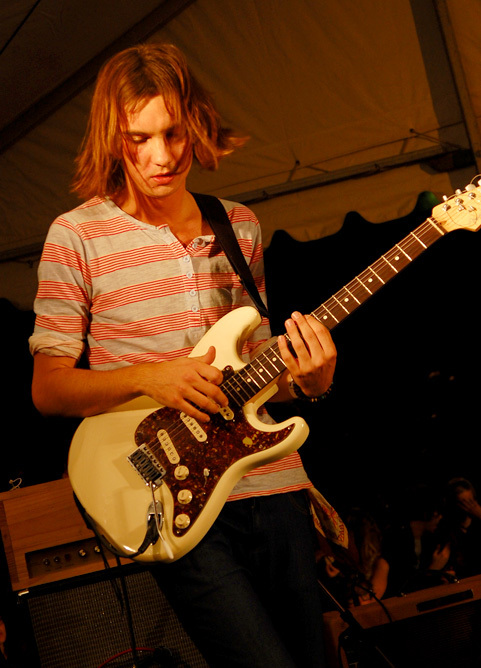
Parker in April 2009 during a performance at Somerville Auditorium

Tame Impala's debut single, "Sundown Syndrome", was recorded at Toerag Studios in London, UK, with recording engineer Liam Watson, while the band was in the UK in March 2009. "Sundown Syndrome" was premiered by Richard Kingsmill on his "2009" show on Triple J on Sunday 10 May 2009. The song was released in July 2009 on vinyl, and digitally with a cover of "Remember Me" by DJ Blue Boy. The band then headlined the inaugural "Rottofest" in August 2009, an annual comedy, film and music festival held on Rottnest Island off the coast of Western Australia. Following Rottofest, they embarked on a national tour through September and October 2009 in support of the single. "Remember Me" appeared at number 78 on Triple J's Hottest 100 for 2009.

"Sundown Syndrome" was included on the soundtrack of the Oscar-nominated film The Kids Are All Right. "Half Full Glass of Wine" was used in HBO's popular television series Entourage as the closing song for an episode. Tame Impala appeared at the Australian/New Zealand Big Day Out festival in early 2010, performing alongside bands such as Muse, The Mars Volta, Kasabian and Rise Against.

=== 2010: Innerspeaker ===
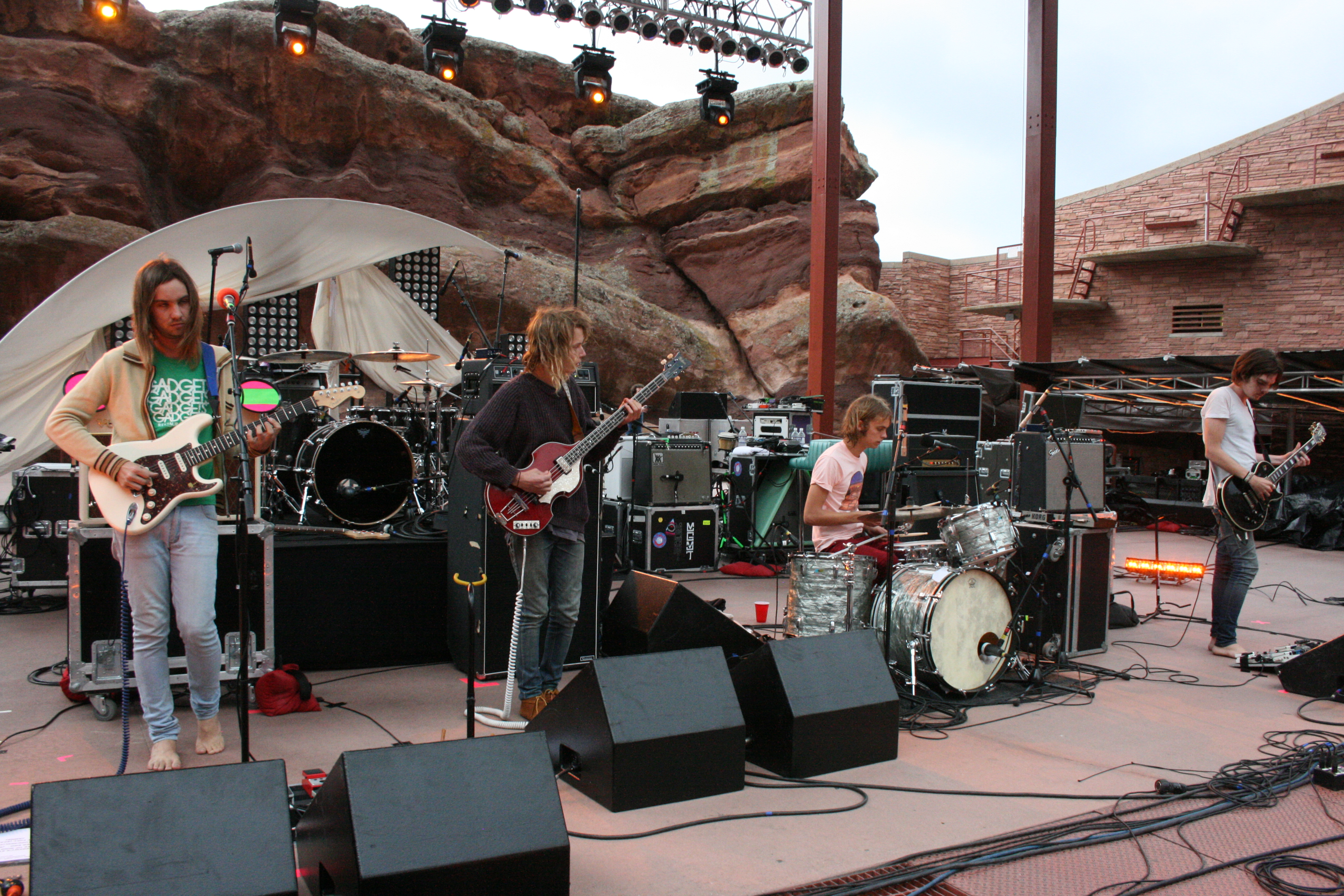
Tame Impala performing at Red Rocks Amphitheatre in June 2010

Tame Impala's debut album Innerspeaker was released on 21 May 2010. In the UK the official release date was 28 June, but iTunes accidentally made it available for purchase on 12 May. The album was released in the United States on 8 June to general and critical acclaim. Pitchfork named it Best New Music.

In an interview with Triple J talking about the album's nomination for the J Award, Parker stated that they had secretly been recording a new album. "Jay and I have been recording pretty compulsively and album number two is nearing potential completion already and I'm so excited about it that I'm having trouble keeping myself from telling you all about it". This came only months after Innerspeaker was released.

The group toured in mid-2010, commencing the Innerspeaker album tour on 13 May 2010 as the opening act for MGMT's 2010 American tour. The band returned to Australia to play at Splendour in the Grass festival, which was followed by a European Tour in July (including an appearance at the Reading Festival) and a national Australian tour in October. In November they returned to the UK and Europe for a fifteen date tour, including their largest London headline show to date which was attended by Noel Gallagher, Tom Meighan, Sergio Pizzorno, Noel Fielding, Alexa Chung and Alison Mosshart. The band then went on to the United States and Canada for twenty headline dates including sold-out shows in Toronto, New York, Los Angeles, and San Francisco. They also received four 2010 ARIA Music Awards nominations which include, "Album of the Year" and "Best Rock Album" for Innerspeaker, "Best Group" and also "Breakthrough Artist".

On 29 November 2010, Innerspeaker won Australian youth-oriented radio network Triple J's highest honour, winning the J Award for Album of the Year.

=== 2011–2014: Lonerism ===
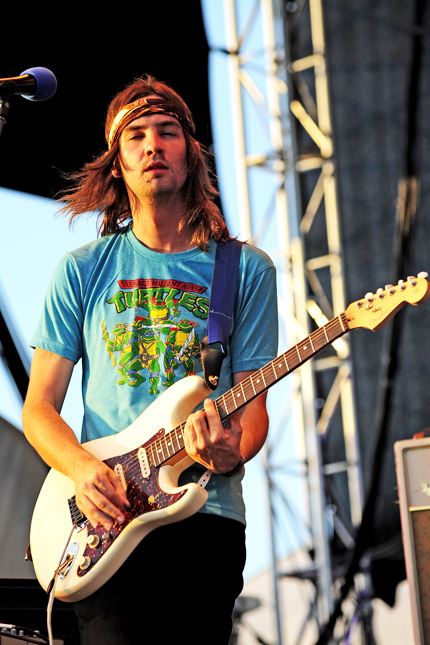
Parker performing with Tame Impala in March 2011

Tame Impala's second album, Lonerism, was released in 2012 and was mixed by Dave Fridmann. Parker said that Lonerism "represents a departure from his previous work by incorporating an expanded sonic palette, more emotional song writing, and a more pronounced narrative perspective". It was created in a similar set up as Innerspeaker, whereby Parker wrote and recorded the majority of the album by himself at his home in Perth, Western Australia. Parts of the recording also occurred in Parker's home studio in France.

While in France, Parker produced and played on the self-titled dream pop album by Melody's Echo Chamber, the project of French singer Melody Prochet. As a result, one of the tracks on Lonerism is titled "Endors Toi", which roughly translates from French to English as "fall asleep". The album cover is a photo taken by Parker of the Jardin du Luxembourg in Paris, France, with additional editing by Leif Podhajsky, a graphic designer who created the album art for Innerspeaker. The image ties into the themes of isolation of Lonerism, with a metal gate separating the viewer from the people in the Gardens.

The band released the song "Apocalypse Dreams" as a free download on 7 July 2012. The first single, "Elephant", was released on 26 July 2012. The album was released on 5 October in Australia, 8 October in the United Kingdom and 9 October in the United States. StillinRock described it as the best album of the year. The album features the songs "Apocalypse Dreams" and "Elephant", which are some of the first songs that Parker has co-written with Watson. "Feels Like We Only Go Backwards" was released as the second single.

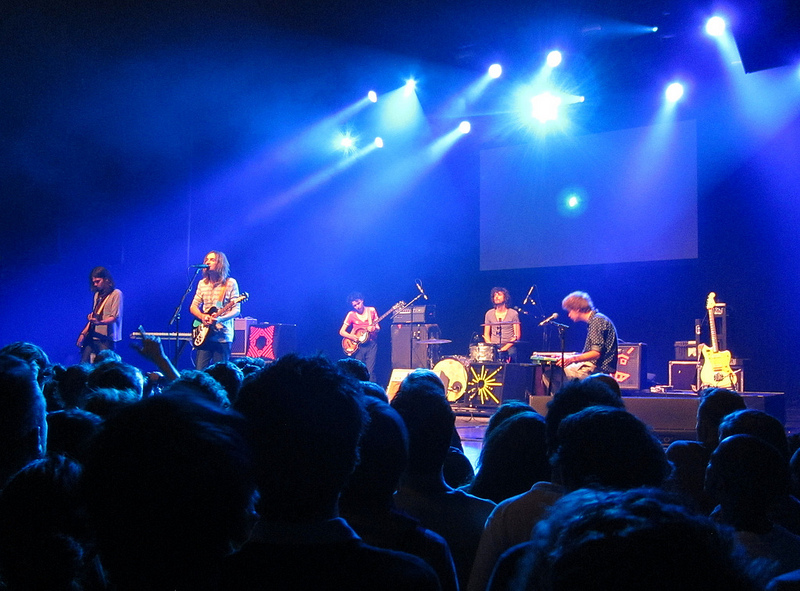
Tame Impala in October 2012

In November 2012, Lonerism won the 2012 J Award for Australian Album of the Year. It was the second time Tame Impala had won the award, after also winning it for their debut album, Innerspeaker, in 2010. They are the first band to win the J Award more than once. In January 2013, Lonerism was selected by Rolling Stone for the 2012 Album of the Year award after the band also won the award in 2011 for Innerspeaker. It was also announced as album of the year by UK magazine NME. Additionally, Lonerism was voted number one overall by Rolling Stone, Triple J, NME, Filter, Urban Outfitters, FasterLouder and Obscure Sound's 2012 Album of the Year polls. Lonerism became the first Australian album to win NME's album of the year. "Elephant" and "Feels Like We Only Go Backwards" appeared at numbers 7 and 9, respectively, in Triple J's Hottest 100 for 2012.

The band began an international tour in 2012 through 2013, supported by the Growl. During this tour, they played major festivals such as Coachella and Sasquatch Festival, and appeared on Late Night with Jimmy Fallon. For this tour, Watson switched from drums to keyboards, and Parker recruited Julien Barbagallo on drums. In September 2012, Tame Impala's first US feature appeared on the cover of the publication The Fader, in its 82nd issue.

On 18 May 2013, it was announced via Facebook that Allbrook would leave the band to focus on other musical endeavours, and that Cam Avery of Pond and The Growl would take his place. Allbrook played his final gig with the band on their last Australian tour date of 2013 at Perth's Belvoir Amphitheatre, the same venue that Allbrook played his first gig with the band at in 2008. As a farewell gesture, the band played a cover of Outkast's "Prototype".

Lonerism received a 2014 Grammy Award nomination in December 2013 in the Best Alternative Music Album category. "Be Above It", the first track on the album, is featured in the 2019 movie Waves. This includes the studio version, the live version from the Live Versions album and the "Erol Alkan Rework" version.

=== 2015–2017: Currents ===
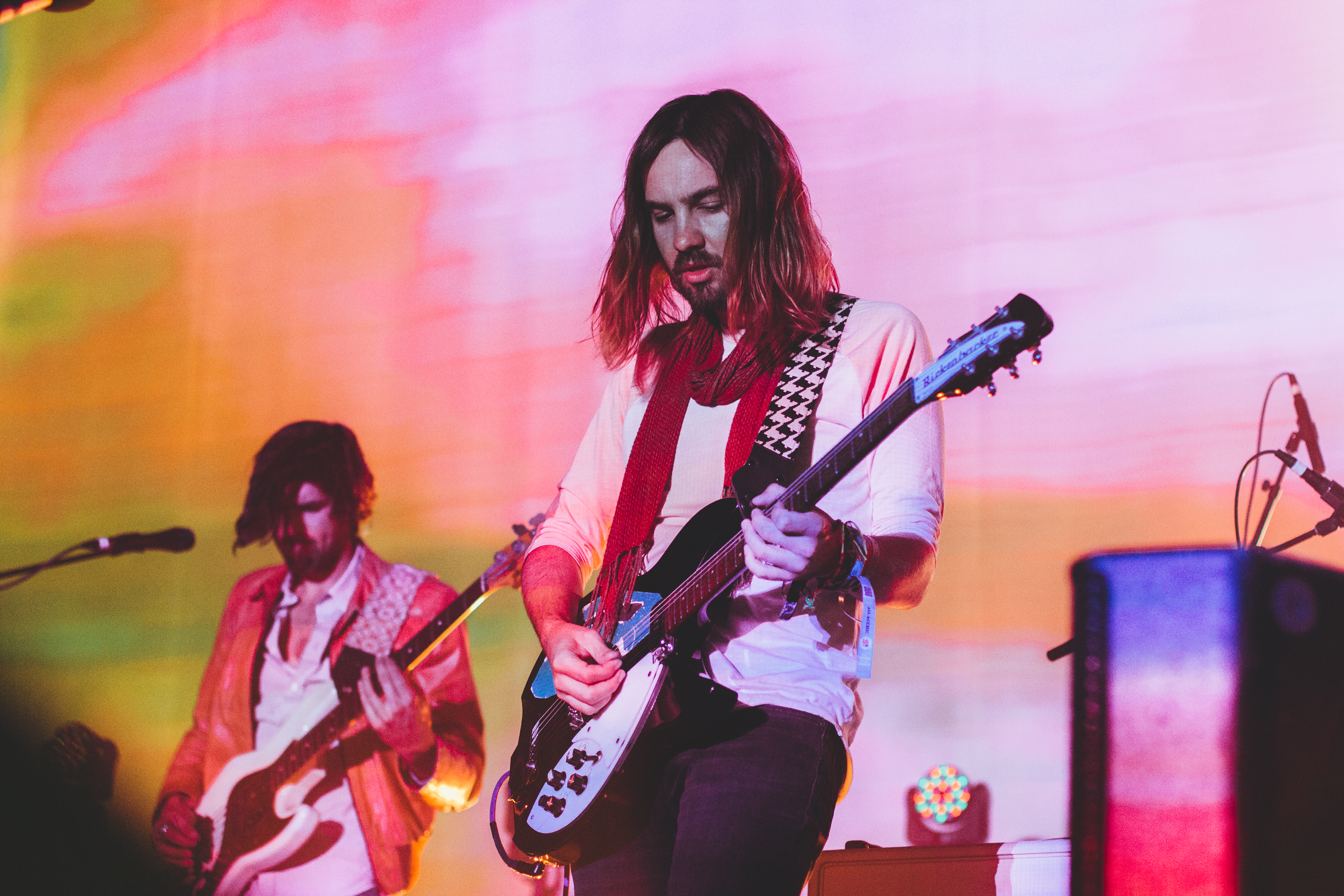
Cam Avery and Kevin Parker, performing with Tame Impala in June 2014

It is believed that Parker started recording the follow-up album to Lonerism at the beginning of 2014, due to various Instagram posts that showed recording taking place at the Wave House in Western Australia, where Innerspeaker was recorded. Prior to this, Parker had been touring with Tame Impala and working on other musical projects, including his disco-funk band, AAA Aardvark Getdown Services. Parker said in May 2013:

Right now, doing another album doesn't excite me. There's something narrow-minded about thinking an album is the only way you can put out music, especially in the world we're in at the moment. Anything is possible. There's so many people doing interesting things with the internet and technology, there could be so many ways of making music and listening to it. It's 2013 and you can make music anywhere... There are so many possibilities, my brain is overloading on them all. I just need to wait, think about things a bit more. Then I'll know what to do next.

In May 2014, Parker spoke of his growing inclination toward the recording of another album in a Triple J radio interview, explaining: "I'm getting more and more sucked into the world of making an album. It's weird how it happens naturally, it's almost feels like a seasonal thing. I've started to think about tracklistings and all the things that come with an album." Describing the sound of the new album, Parker said, "I'm gonna try to make it a bit more minimal this time; only use what's needed ... instead of a supreme pizza, where you just throw everything on". Watson added, "[It's] probably gonna be less rock again and more electronic again, even more than the last one". Parker later stated that the inspiration behind the new polished sound of Tame Impala's third album came from listening to a Fleetwood Mac song. He said that the pureness and cleanness of Fleetwood Mac's song prompted him to attempt to create a more streamlined musical style within Currents.

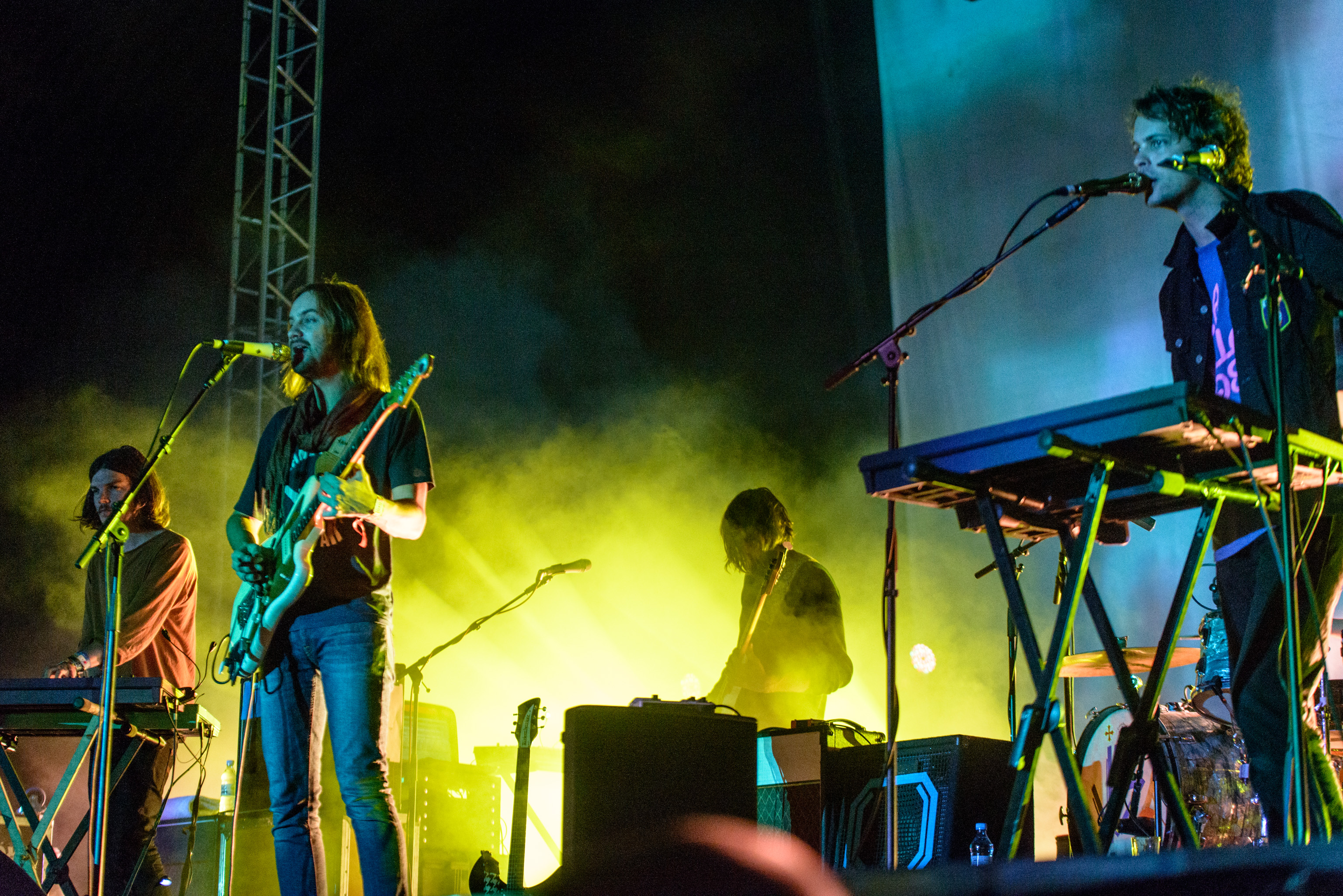
Tame Impala performing at Lollapalooza in September 2015

On 6 January 2015, Spinning Top Music announced that a new Tame Impala album will be released in 2015. During the same month, it was announced that the band would perform at the Boston Calling Music Festival in May 2015. On 11 March 2015, a new song titled "Let It Happen" was released as a free download.

On 5 April 2015, Tame Impala announced and released the album cover for Currents in a Facebook post. A few hours later, the band released the first official single from the upcoming album on Facebook called "'Cause I'm a Man". Later that month, on 22 April 2015, Tame Impala officially released "Let it Happen" as the second single from the album. One week later, on 29 April 2015, Kevin Parker held an AMA on Reddit, where he provoked fans to ask him to release a new song, then responding with "Disciples", which became the first promotional single for Currents. On 7 May 2015, the band announced that the album would be released on 17 July 2015 and released the third official single, "Eventually". The record ended up being the best selling one in their discography, with 1.3 million copies sold worldwide. During the same 30 April 2015 Reddit AMA, Parker said: "Up until recently, from all of Tame Impala's record sales outside of Australia I had received.... zero dollars. Someone high up spent the money before it got to me. I may never get that money."

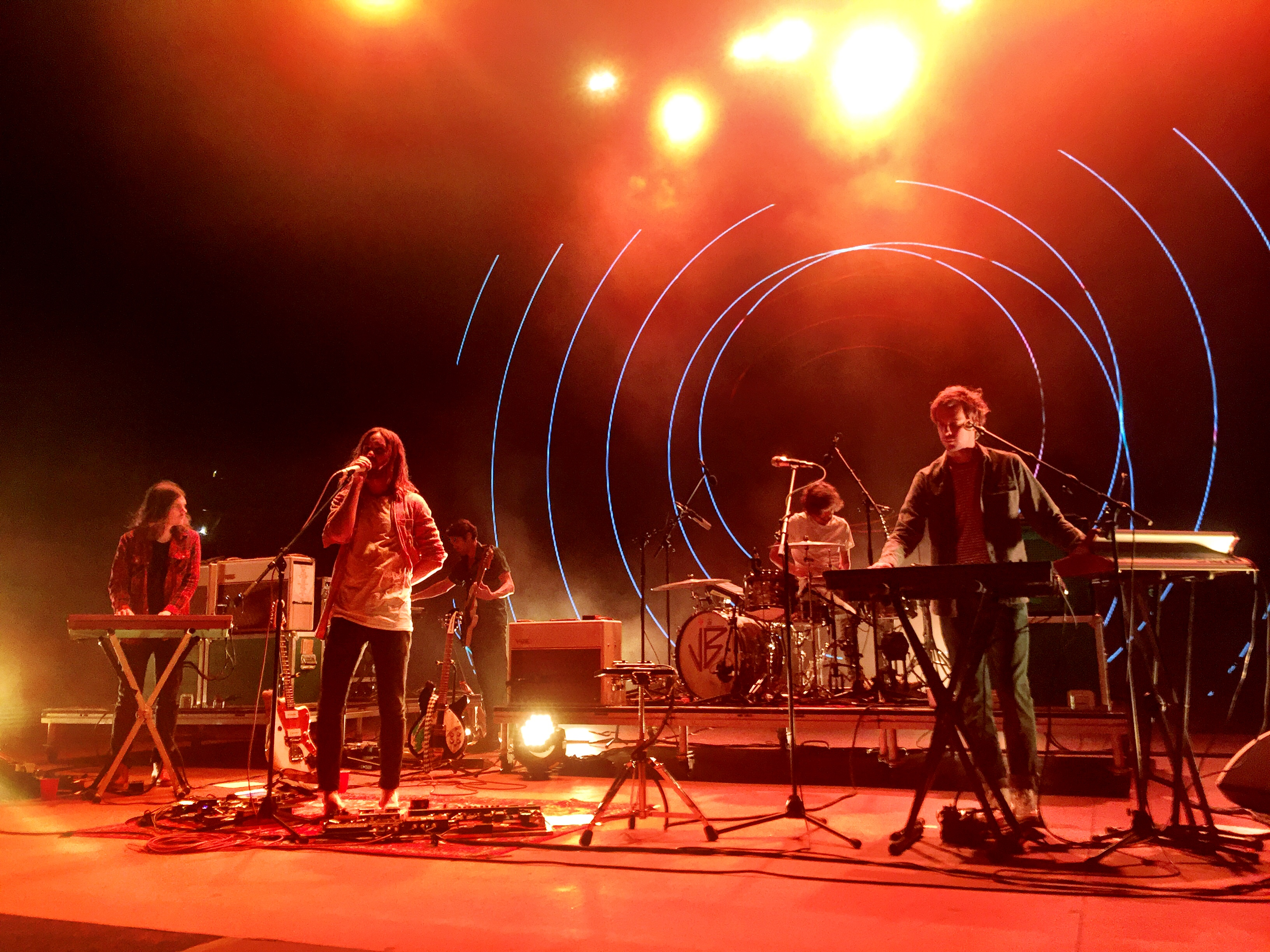
Tame Impala performing at Red Rocks Amphitheatre in August 2016

In October 2017, a collector's edition of Currents was announced. Released on 17 November, it included three B-sides and two remixes.

=== 2018: Other projects ===
By the end of 2017, Tame Impala announced that they agreed to play the 2018 Mad Cool Festival in Spain, the first live music show the band agreed to play in 2018. Tame Impala also played a headline set at London's Citadel Festival in July 2018.

In March 2018, Parker worked with American rappers Travis Scott and Kanye West, as well as record producers Pharrell Williams, The Weeknd, Mike Dean, and Reine Fiske on the song "Skeletons", which would eventually be released by Scott on his 2018 album Astroworld. In July 2018, during an interview with Beats 1 anchor host Matt Wilkinson, Parker confirmed for the first time that he had begun working on a new Tame Impala album, adding that he was "ready to play some other songs live" and expressing an interest to headline a stage at Glastonbury Festival in 2019. He also stated that he would be "very disappointed" if the new record by Tame Impala wasn't released by summer 2019. On 1 July 2018, Tame Impala teamed up with electronic artist ZHU to create the single "My Life".

In October 2018, Parker played bass for rapper Travis Scott for a performance of "Skeletons/Astrothunder" on Saturday Night Live, with singer-songwriter John Mayer also part of the backing band. On 10 October, the band was scheduled to headline the first night of the annual Desert Daze festival in its new location in Moreno Beach, but had to cut their set short after three songs due to inclement weather. On 31 October, rapper Theophilus London released a new single in collaboration with Tame Impala under the moniker of "Theo Impala".

=== 2019–2022: The Slow Rush ===
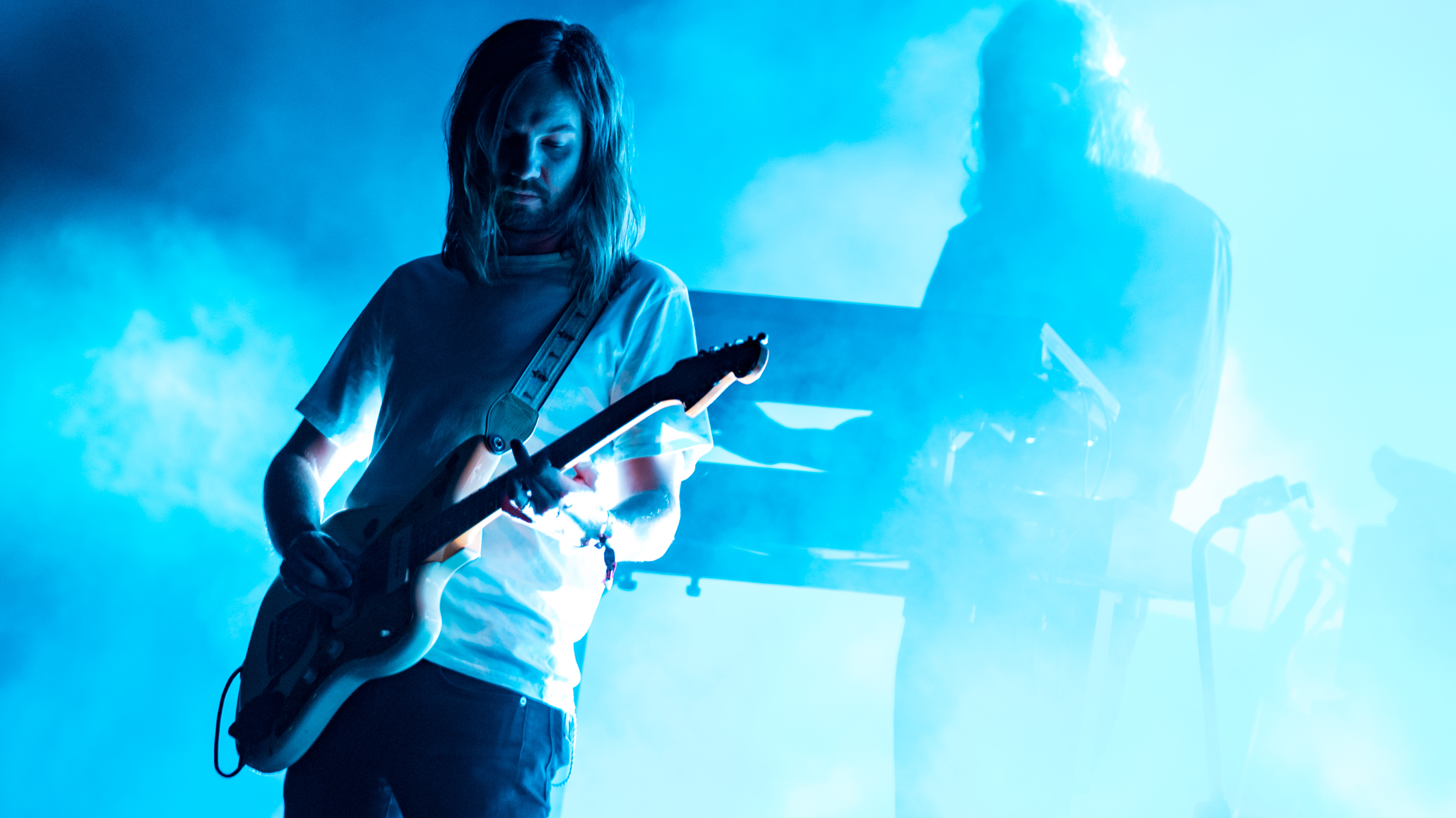
Tame Impala performing at Primavera Sound 2019

On 2 January 2019, Tame Impala was announced as a headliner for the 2019 Coachella Valley Music and Arts Festival. They also headlined the 2020 Primavera Sound festival, making them only the second Australian act to do so. Around the same time, Parker announced that he expected to release a new album during that summer.

On 21 March 2019, Tame Impala released the single "Patience" and teased new music on Instagram for the forthcoming album. They were the musical guest for Saturday Night Live on 30 March, with host Sandra Oh. On the show, the band performed "Patience" and a new song, "Borderline", which was released 12 April. On 25 October, Tame Impala revealed the title of their fourth studio album, The Slow Rush. Three days later on 28 October, they released the song "It Might Be Time", and on 3 December, they released the single "Posthumous Forgiveness". The album was released on 14 February 2020 and features 12 tracks that were recorded in Los Angeles and in Parker's hometown of Fremantle, Australia.

Josh Terry of Vice named Tame Impala his "Artist of the Decade" for the 2010s, writing, "No artist captured how genres cross-pollinated throughout the 2010s better than Tame Impala". He added, "In the age of streaming and the big-box festival bubble, Parker's discography seems factory-made for both a crowd of thousands and a chill night alone with a vibe-heavy playlist" and that "his music embodies the technology-driven sense of loneliness of this decade better than any of his peers".

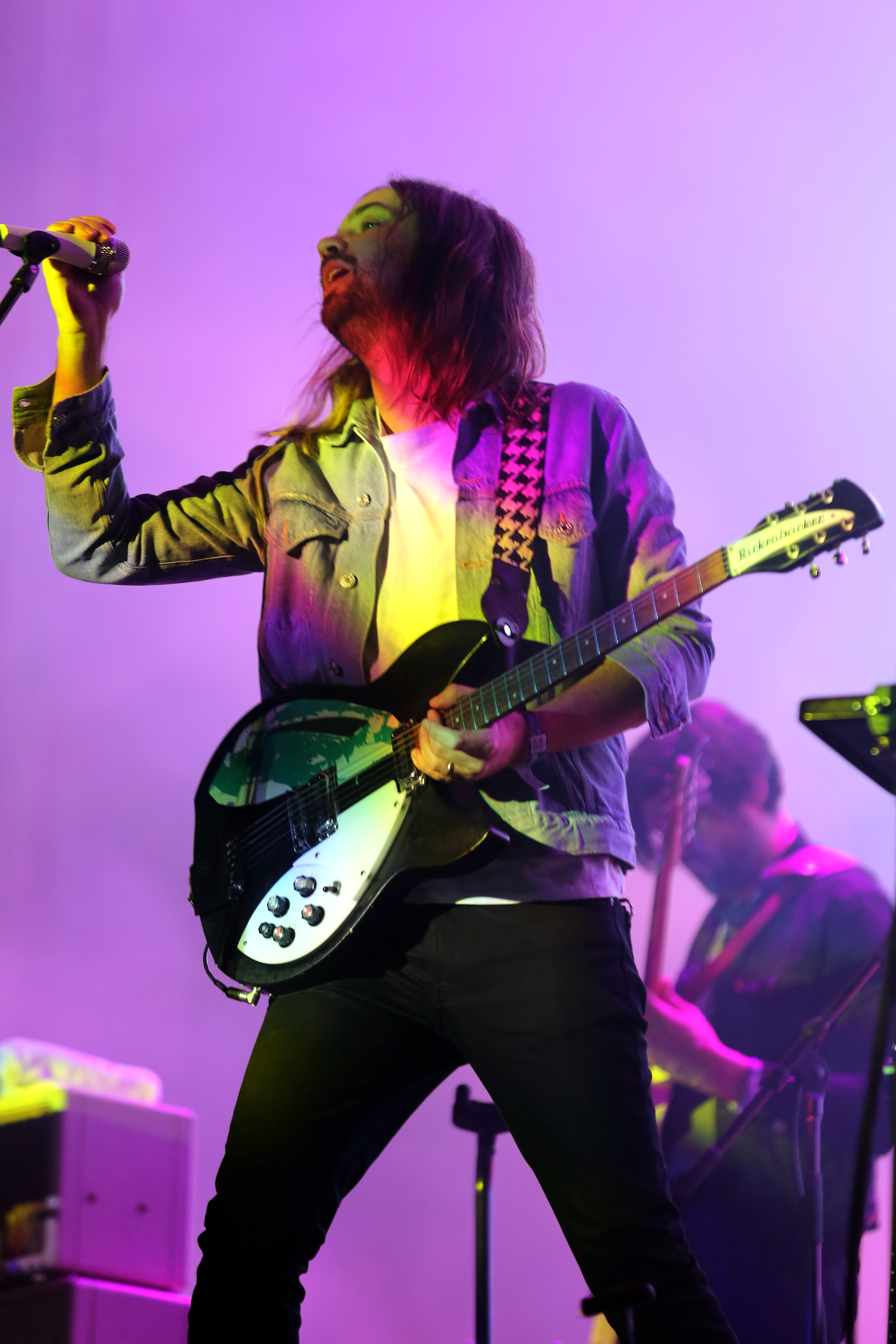
Tame Impala performing at the Southside Festival 2019

"The Less I Know the Better" was voted number one in Triple J's Hottest 100 of the Decade on 14 March 2020. This was the highest ranking for Tame Impala in a Hottest 100 Countdown and the first time the project had attained number one in any Hottest 100; the same song had previously placed fourth in the 2015 Hottest 100.

On 20 March 2020, Parker appeared on the Weeknd's album After Hours, producing and providing background vocals on the track "Repeat After Me (Interlude)". At the 2020 ARIA Music Awards in November, Tame Impala won a further five trophies: "Album of the Year", "Best Rock Album", Engineer of the Year" and "Producer of the Year" for The Slow Rush, as well as "Best Group".

In March 2021, the band's 2012 song "Elephant", from the album Lonerism, was covered by the Australian children's music group The Wiggles for Triple J's Like a Version segment. The Wiggles' cover version went on to place at number one in 2021's Hottest 100. In October 2021, the band announced that a deluxe box set edition of The Slow Rush would be released in February 2022.

The band released The Slow Rush B-Sides and Remixes in February 2022. In May 2022, the band released the single "Turn Up the Sunshine", a collaboration with Diana Ross. The track is the lead single from the Jack Antonoff-produced original soundtrack album for the film Minions: The Rise of Gru. With the exception of this track, the album primarily features new spins on classic '70s hits by artists such as Brittany Howard, St. Vincent, H.E.R. and many others. In August 2022, Gorillaz released the song "New Gold", on which Tame Impala is featured.

=== 2023–present: Collaborations and Deadbeat ===
Throughout 2023 and 2024, Tame Impala was featured in a number of collaborations and soundtracks. In March 2023, Tame Impala released the song "Wings of Time" from the soundtrack of the film Dungeons & Dragons: Honor Among Thieves. In April 2023, Tame Impala collaborated with Thundercat and released "No More Lies". He assisted in songwriting, and provided guitar, vocals, drums, and keyboards. For the film Barbie, Tame Impala released "Journey to the Real World", as part of the soundtrack album.

In January 2024, Tame Impala collaborated with Justice on the single "One Night/All Night" for their album Hyperdrama. On the album's release in April 2024, Tame Impala appeared on another song, "Neverender". Parker co-wrote and produced Dua Lipa's third studio album, Radical Optimism. He later joined Lipa onstage during her headline performance at Glastonbury 2024, performing Tame Impala's "The Less I Know the Better" and Lipa's "Houdini".

On 15 May 2024, it was announced Sony Music Publishing had purchased the catalog of Tame Impala from Parker for an undisclosed amount, encompassing all previous and future works. Moreover, in a mid-2024 interview with The Guardian, Parker said that work on the fifth Tame Impala album had begun, stating: "It's not finished yet, but I think it'll be [finished] soon. I'm loving how excited I am by it." He had earlier reassured fans of the unreleased album's progress on Instagram with images of him at work in his studio in Los Angeles and Western Australia, the latter of which was captioned "don't worry". On 28 March 2025, Parker appeared on Dua Lipa's Radical Optimism Tour as special guest performing "The Less I Know The Better" in her segment playing local songs.

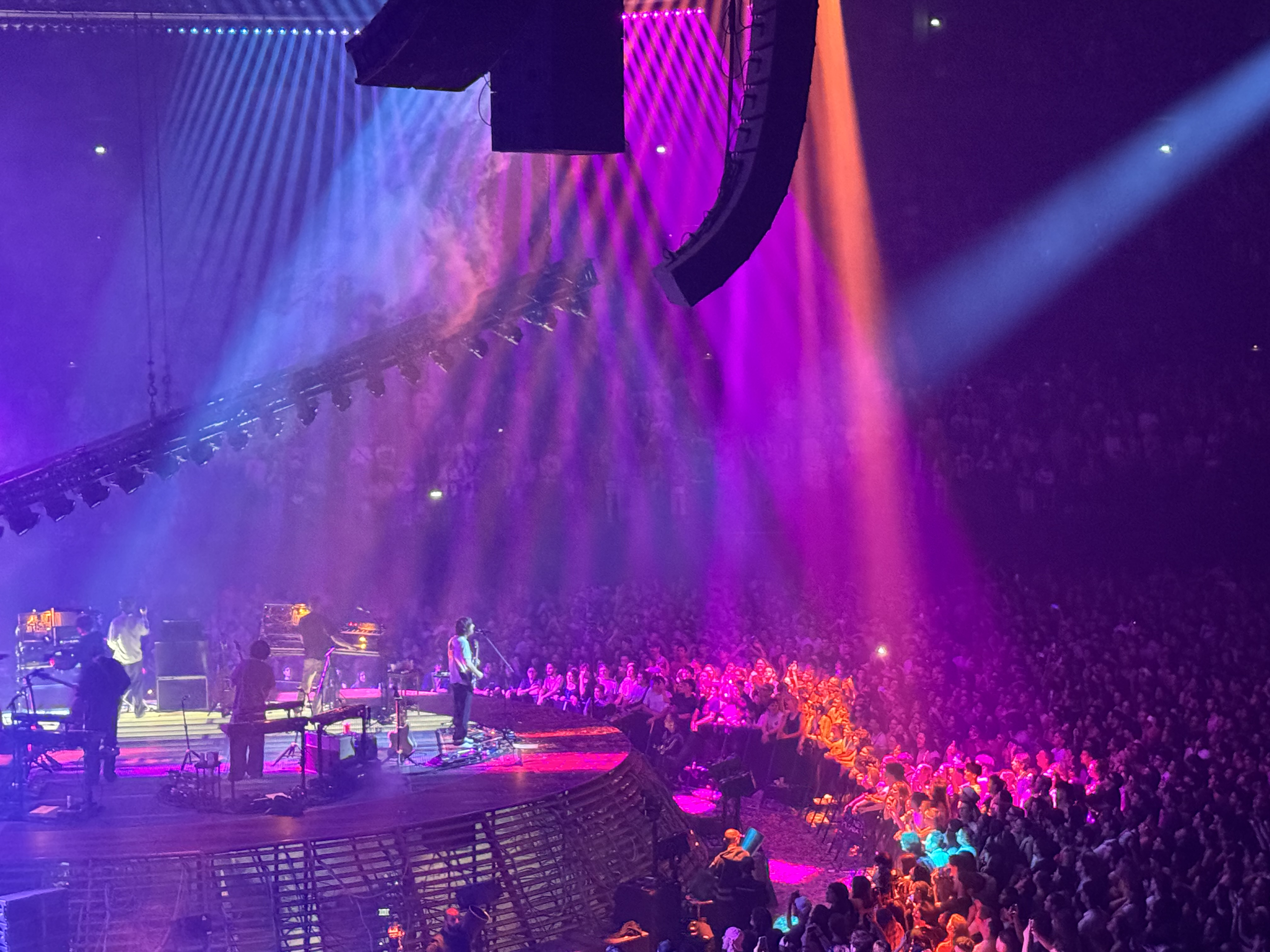
Tame Impala performing "in the round" in April 2026 during the Deadbeat Tour

On 7 June 2025, Parker previewed a new song while DJing at Nitsa Club in Barcelona during Primavera Sound. He told the audience "there's no going back from this point on". The song, titled "End of Summer", and an accompanying music video were released on 25 July, with an accompanying limited edition twelve-inch vinyl single, which featured a second new song on its B-side. On 3 September and 26 September 2025 respectively, the songs "Loser" and "Dracula" were released as singles with accompanying music videos. Furthermore, the music video for "Loser" stars actor and musician Joe Keery. On 4 September 2025, Parker announced the title and album cover for the fifth Tame Impala album, Deadbeat. It was released on 17 October 2025 to polarizing reviews, featuring a more house-adjacent sound inspired by the rave scene of Western Australia. A remix of the single "Dracula" with South Korean singer Jennie was released on 6 February 2026. The viral remix became Tame Impala's first song to reach the top ten of the US Billboard Hot 100 as well as the Billboard Global 200. In October 2026, Justice released the song "Flower in a Hurricane" for Grand Theft Auto VI, which featured Tame Impala, SZA, and King Gizzard and the Lizard Wizard. On 20 November 2026, Tame Impala was announced as a headliner for Coachella 2027 alongside prior collaborators Dua Lipa and SZA.

== Musical style ==
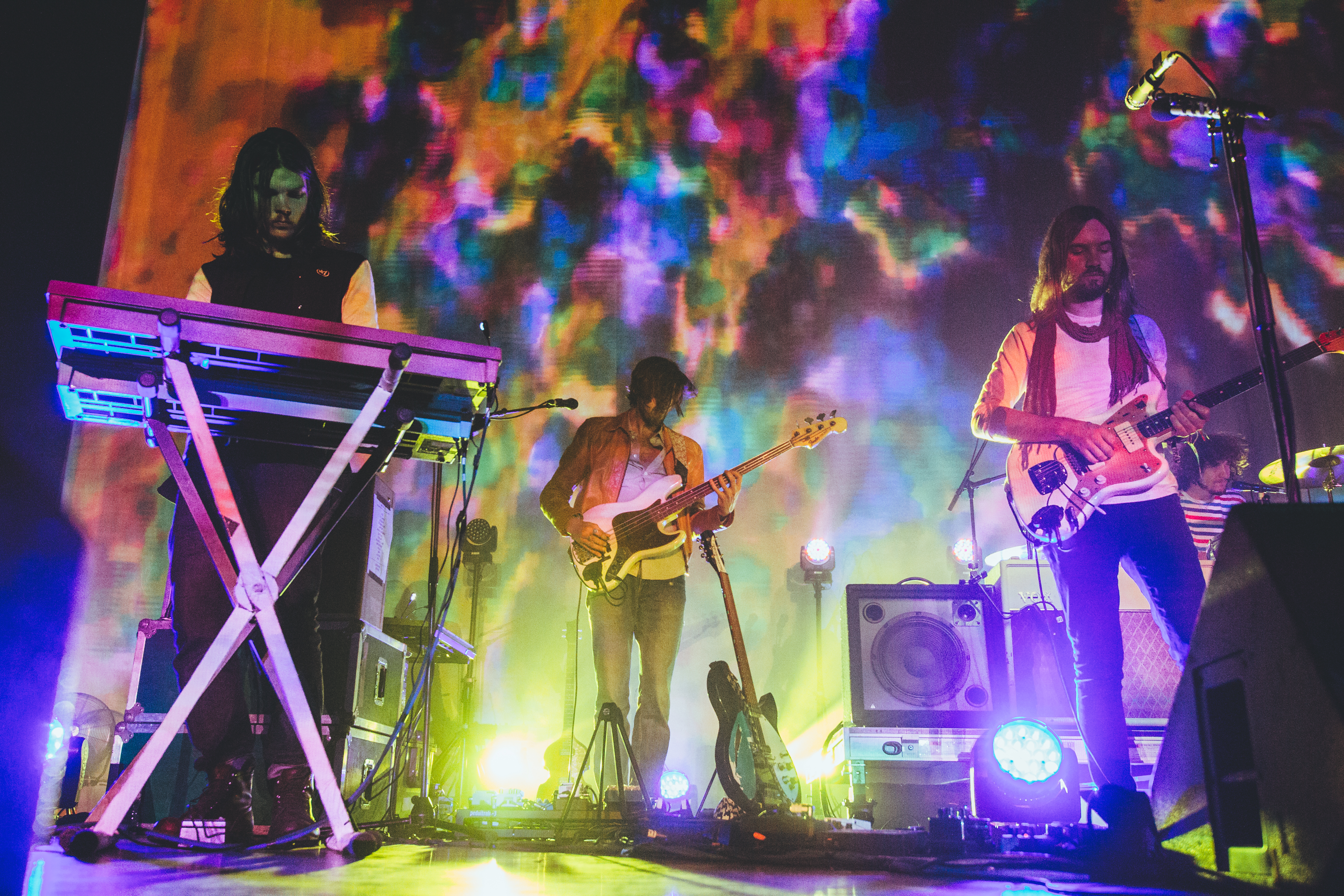
Tame Impala performing in 2014

Parker's decision to make the music for Tame Impala in the studio by himself is a result of his liking "the kind of music that is the result of one person constructing an awesome symphony of sound. You can layer your own voice 700 times for half a second if you want, and I just love that kind of music". However, Parker has to translate his music to a live setting with the band, and the band doesn't play the songs until they have been recorded. "The only jamming that's done as a band is done a long time after the song is recorded for the sake of the live environment. It's good for us, because we can take a song that's been recorded and do what we want to it: slow it down, speed it up, make it 10 seconds or 10 minutes long. It gives us a lot of freedom."

Some favoured and often-used effects by Parker include phasing, delay, reverb and fuzz. Experimentation with different effects pedals such as the BOSS BR600 and Moog Moogerfooger MF-105M has led to Parker creating new and unique sounds. "If you make an effort to not put the pedals in the order you're meant to, then you'll end up with something new-sounding. We don't have any things that we got from another planet or anything; it's the same things everyone else has used. People have a distortion pedal and then a reverb pedal. A reverb is meant to make it sound like it's in a cathedral or something. If you put it the other way around, it won't sound like a guitar being played in a church; it'll sound like a church being stuffed inside a shoebox and then exploded. You can do different things just by treating things differently".

Parker has commented on his process for making music: "I'll have a sudden, spontaneous vision of a song, have all the parts mapped out in mind, and do my best to record it as quick as I can. I'll find my eight-track and do a quick demo of just the riff, or a verse or a chorus. The song will go for like 30 seconds. I'll have a whole bunch of them [demos] and then I'll just choose which ones to make into full songs". Parker has a strong sense of melody in his music, having composed "excessively melodic music from about the age of 12 to 15". For Parker, the music comes before the lyrics: "I usually write the lyrics after the melody and its timing have been decided. But the words have to be meaningful. I try to synchronise certain words with the best parts of the melody, but it can be really difficult and does my head in. I like to keep the meaning pretty open and ambiguous so that it's not just me that gets something out of the lyrics. I usually write lyrics from a persona rather than tell a specific story." Parker also said: "Usually I am sufficiently motivated to think of new songs every day, but I usually forget them. I seem to get an emotional kick out of sensing feelings of general desperation or hopelessness, whether it's me or someone near me or someone in a movie or anything. It's really difficult to sit down and force yourself to write a song, and that forced nature usually comes out in the song, so I just have to wait until they come to me."

=== Influences ===
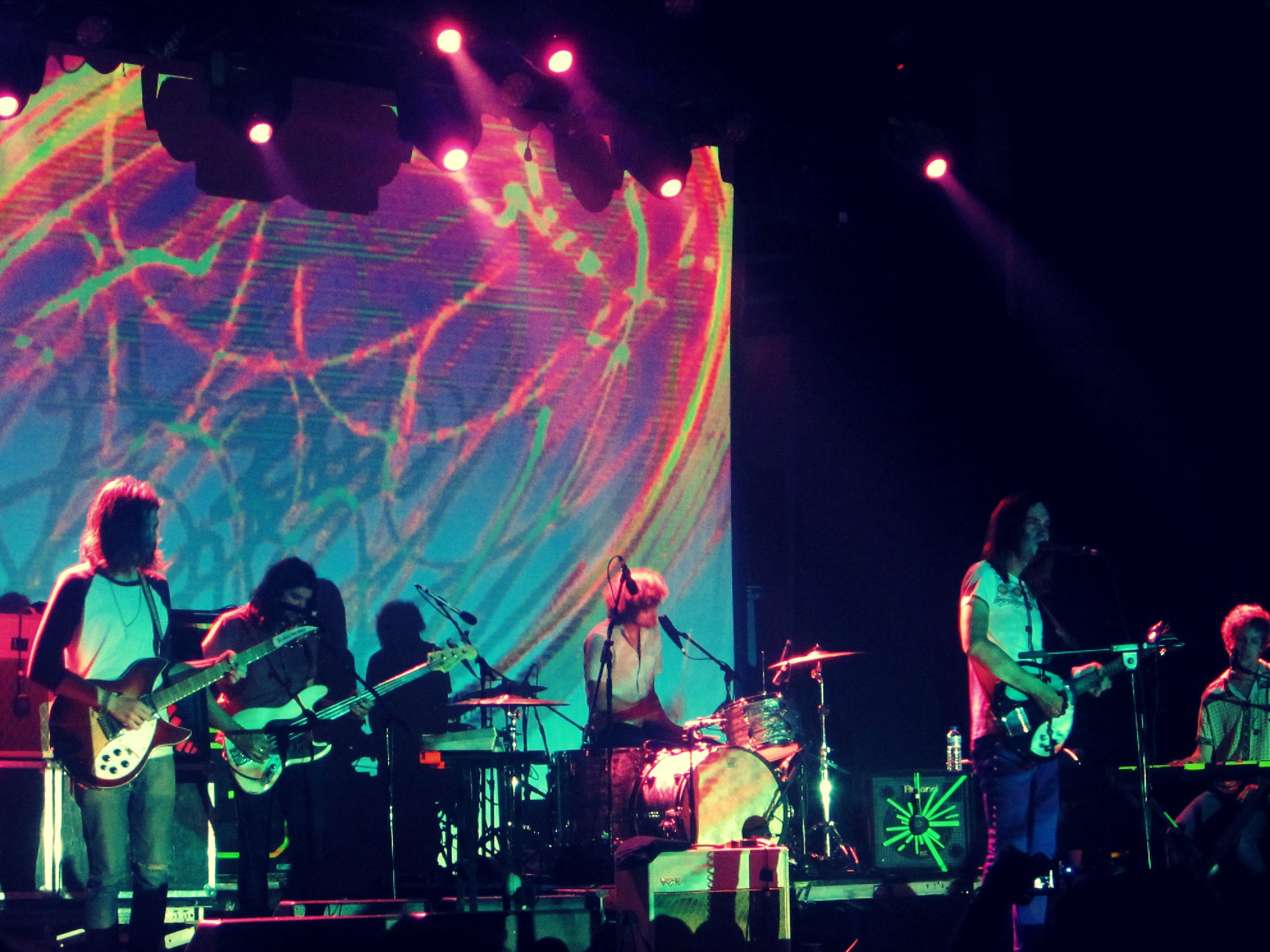
Tame Impala's music and live visuals are heavily influenced by psychedelic music.

Tame Impala's music is heavily influenced by late 1960s and early 1970s psychedelic rock. Parker has stated that he has a "fetish for extremely sugary pop music" from such artists as Britney Spears and Kylie Minogue. Parker also enjoys "fucked-up explosive cosmic music" in the vein of The Flaming Lips, with whom Tame Impala collaborated on the track "Children of the Moon"; the song appeared on the band's 2012 collaborative album The Flaming Lips and Heady Fwends.

Combining these two things, the shoegaze band My Bloody Valentine have influenced Parker's music with their contrasting mix of abrasive guitars and ethereal melodies. He has "always been in love with the wall of sound as employed by My Bloody Valentine" and tries to capture the same "melancholy, dreamy feel" with Tame Impala. Parker has elaborated on achieving a similar sonic balance in his own music: "If I was singing, I wouldn't be able to match the tone of the instruments, which is really crunchy. The instruments are quite sonically brutal, but the voice is really soft, and I think that kind of resonates with people. It's kind of like My Bloody Valentine, where it's really brutal sounding, but kind of beautiful at the same time". Tame Impala live drummer Jay Watson has described Parker's music as incorporating a "shoegaze-y guitar sound, but not played in a shoegazey manner".

Electronic music is another significant influence on Tame Impala's music. Parker aims to incorporate the structure of electronic music into rock instrumentation: "The way we do music, it's organic, but it's meant to be quite repetitive and hypnotic, almost in a kind of electronic nature. Using our playing as though it was a living sample". A sound featured prominently on Innerspeaker is a pitch-shifted guitar tone that many mistook for a synth. Parker has explained his reasoning for such production choices: "I had a few obsessions when recording Innerspeaker. One was to make the guitars sound like synths and drums sound like drum samples and pretty much anything except guitars and drums. I'm obsessed with confusing people as to the origin of a sound." He has described his dream collaboration as "probably [being] someone really, really kind of fucked up", citing the electronic artists Aphex Twin and Squarepusher as examples: "You know, someone that would like scare me, but I'd be able to see how they do all their really insanely headcase stuff and I'd be able to learn from it".

Parker was inspired to take up various creative endeavours at a young age: "I used to draw a lot when I was very young, and I used to get the most immense feeling of satisfaction from finishing a picture and looking back at it, even though I wasn't actually that good. When I started playing music, I got the same feeling from making a song, even if it was just a few noises or drum patterns put together. It was all about the buzz from making something from nothing. Music always affected me greatly as a listener anyway, usually from listening to music in my dad's car or listening to him play guitar".

Lo-fi music is also a favourite of Parker's, and he incorporated it heavily in the early days of Tame Impala, heard prominently on the Tame Impala EP. With the release of Innerspeaker, Parker went for a different approach to a lo-fi sound, aiming more for a more cosmic and sonic wall of sound, helped by mixer Dave Fridmann. Parker explained: "It sounds more cohesive, like an organism. It has a different emotion to it; it brings out a different feeling when it's absolutely blaring at you. I love that sound."

Parker has also stated that Supertramp, one of his favourite bands, are a major influence on the musical style of Tame Impala. Despite their difference in sound, he feels he is always somewhat "channeling Supertramp". He has said that listening to the Bee Gees on mushrooms inspired him to change the sound of the music he was making on Currents.

== Members ==
=== Studio ===
- Kevin Parker – all vocals and instruments, production (2007–present)

=== Live ===
==== Current live musicians ====
- Kevin Parker – lead vocals, guitar (2007–present), occasional synthesiser (2019–present)
- Dominic Simper – bass guitar (2007–2013), guitar, synthesiser, keyboards (2010–present)
- Jay Watson – drums (2007–2012), synthesiser, keyboards (2012–present), guitar (2013–2017, 2025–present), backing vocals (2007–present)
- Julien Barbagallo – drums, percussion, backing vocals (2012–present), synthesiser (2025–present)
- Cam Avery – bass guitar, synthesiser, backing vocals (2013–present)
- James Ireland – guitar, synthesiser, percussion, drums (2025–present)

==== Former live musicians ====
- Nick Allbrook – bass guitar, guitar, synthesiser (2009–2013, guest 2020)
- Loren Humphrey – drums (2019; substitute for Julien Barbagallo)
- Rafael Lazzaro-Colon – percussion (2019–2023)

== Discography ==
- Innerspeaker (2010)
- Lonerism (2012)
- Currents (2015)
- The Slow Rush (2020)
- Deadbeat (2025)

== Tours ==
- Tame Impala EP Tour (2008)
- Skeleton Tiger Tour (2009)
- Sundown Syndrome Tour (2009)
- Innerspeaker Tour (2010–2011)
- Lonerism Tour (2012–2014)
- Currents Tour (2015–2018)
- 2019 World Tour (2019)
- The Slow Rush Tour (2020–2023)
- Deadbeat Tour (2025–2027)
