= Pond (Australian band) discography =

Pond discography
- Studio albums: 11
- EPs: 2
- Live albums: 1
- Compilation albums: 1
- Singles: 33
- Music videos: 35

The discography of the Australian psychedelic rock band Pond consists of 11 studio albums, two EPs, one live album, one compilation album, 33 singles, and 35 music videos.

== Albums ==
=== Studio albums ===
List of studio albums, with release date, label, and selected chart positions shown
Title	Album details	Peak chart positions	
Title	Album details	AUS	UK
Psychedelic Mango	Released: 9 January 2009; Label: Badminton Bandit (BB001); Formats: CD, digital download	—	—
Corridors of Blissterday	Released: 4 June 2009; Label: Badminton Bandit (BB002); Formats: CD, digital download	—	—
Frond	Released: 6 September 2010; Label: Hole in the Sky (HITS007); Formats: CD, LP, digital download	—	—
Beard, Wives, Denim	Released: 2 March 2012; Label: Modular (MODCD148); Formats: CD, LP, digital download, streaming	64	—
Hobo Rocket	Released: 2 August 2013; Label: Modular (MODCD165); Formats: CD, LP, digital download, streaming	37	146
Man It Feels Like Space Again	Released: 23 January 2015; Label: Caroline, EMI Music Australia (4708353); Formats: CD, LP, digital download, streaming	15	92
The Weather	Released: 5 May 2017; Label: Marathon Artists (5740829); Formats: CD, LP, digital download, streaming	33	— (Note: The Weather didn't enter the UK top 100, but peaked at number 16 on the Official Vinyl Albums Chart)
Tasmania	Released: 1 March 2019; Label: Spinning Top, Caroline (STCD005); Formats: CD, LP, digital download, streaming	15	— (Note: Tasmania didn't enter the UK top 100, but peaked at number 30 on the Official Vinyl Albums Chart)
9	Released: 1 October 2021; Label: Spinning Top (STR025CD); Formats: CD, cassette, LP, digital download, streaming	6	— (Note: 9 didn't enter the UK top 100, but peaked at number 23 on the Official Vinyl Albums Chart)
Stung!	Released: 21 June 2024; Label: Spinning Top (STR037CD); Formats: CD, LP, digital download, streaming	49	— (Note: Stung didn't enter the UK top 100, but peaked at number 36 on the Official Vinyl Albums Chart)
Terrestrials	Released: 19 June 2026; Label: Mangovision, Secretly Distribution; Formats: CD, cassette, LP, digital download, streaming	19	—

=== Live albums ===
List of live albums, with release date and label shown
Title	Album details
Sessions	Released: 8 November 2019; Label: Spinning Top, Caroline (STLP015); Formats: LP, digital download, streaming

=== Compilation albums ===
List of compilation albums, with release date and label shown
Title	Album details
The Early Years: 2008–2010	Released: 12 April 2025; Label: Spinning Top (STR038LP); Formats: LP, digital download, streaming

== Extended plays ==
List of extended plays
Title	Album details
Greens Pool	Released: 23 December 2010; Label: Badminton Bandit (BB0011); Formats: LP, digital download
Live at the BBC	Released: 14 October 2022; Label: Spinning Top; Formats: Digital download, streaming

== Singles ==
List of singles, with year released and album name shown
Title	Year	Album
"Cloud City"	2010	Frond
"Annie Orangetree"	2010	Frond
"Greens Pool"	2010	Greens Pool (EP)
"Fantastic Explosion of Time"	2011	Beard, Wives, Denim
"Moth Wings"	2012	Beard, Wives, Denim
"Mystery"	2012	Beard, Wives, Denim
"Giant Tortoise"	2013	Hobo Rocket
"Xanman"	2013	Hobo Rocket
"Elvis' Flaming Star"	2014	Man It Feels Like Space Again
"Sitting Up on Our Crane"	2014	Man It Feels Like Space Again
"Zond"	2015	Man It Feels Like Space Again
"Man It Feels Like Space Again"	2015	Man It Feels Like Space Again
"Sweep Me Off My Feet"	2016	The Weather
"30000 Megatons"	2016	The Weather
"The Weather"	2017	The Weather
"Paint Me Silver"	2017	The Weather
"Burnt Out Star"	2018	Tasmania
"Sixteen Days"	2018	Tasmania
"Daisy"	2019	Tasmania
"Don't Look at the Sun (Or You'll Go Blind)"	2019	Sessions (Note: "Don't Look at the Sun or You'll Go Blind" originally appeared on Psychedelic Mango (2009). The song was re-recorded and released as a single for Sessions (2019).)
"Pink Lunettes"	2021	9
"America's Cup"	2021	9
"Toast"	2021	9
"Human Touch"	2021	9
"Lights of Leeming"	2022	9 (Deluxe)
"Hang a Cross on Me" (featuring Cowboy John)	2022	9 (Deluxe)
"Neon River"	2024	Stung!
"(I'm) Stung"	2024	Stung!
"So Lo"	2024	Stung!
"Terrestrials"	2026	Terrestrials
"Two Hands"	2026	Terrestrials
"Through the Heather"	2026	Terrestrials
"Skyworks"	2026	Terrestrials

== Music videos ==
List of music videos, with year released, album name, and director shown
Title	Year	Album	Director(s)
"Fantastic Explosion of Time"	2012	Beard, Wives, Denim	AMJC
"You Broke My Cool"	2012	Beard, Wives, Denim	Unknown
"Moth Wings"	2012	Beard, Wives, Denim	Unknown
"Giant Tortoise"	2013	Hobo Rocket	Unknown
"O Dharma"	2013	Hobo Rocket	Unknown
"Midnight Mass (At the Market Street Payphone)"	2013	Hobo Rocket	Jesse Taylor Smith, Jenna Eriksen
"Elvis' Flaming Star"	2014	Man It Feels Like Space Again	Unknown
"Sitting Up On Our Crane"	2014	Man It Feels Like Space Again	Alejandro Miguel Justino Crawford
"Zond"	2015	Man It Feels Like Space Again	Johnny Mackay
"Man It Feels Like Space Again"	2015	Man It Feels Like Space Again	Jesse Taylor Smith, Jenna Eriksen
"Sweep Me Off My Feet"	2017	The Weather	Matt Sav
"30000 Megatons"	2017	The Weather	Ashley Rommelrath
"The Weather"	2017	The Weather	Ashley Rommelrath
"Paint Me Silver"	2017	The Weather	Alejandro Miguel Justino Crawford
"Colder Than Ice"	2017	The Weather	Pond, George Foster
"All I Want for Xmas (Is a Tascam 388)"	2017	The Weather	Jamie Terry
"Fire In the Water"	2018	The Weather	Sam Kristofski
"Sixteen Days"	2018	Tasmania	Sam Kristofski
"Daisy"	2019	Tasmania	Jesse Taylor Smith
"The Boys Are Killing Me"	2019	Tasmania	Jay Watson, Pond
"Hand Mouth Dancer"	2019	Tasmania	Elliott Arndt
"Pink Lunettes"	2021	9	Jamie Terry, Pond
"America's Cup"	2021	9	Sam Kristofski
"Human Touch"	2021	9	Duncan Wright, Nick Allbrook
"Toast"	2021	9	Pond, Alex Haygarth
"Take Me Avalon I'm Young"	2021	9	Bunny Kinney
"Lights of Leeming"	2022	9 (Deluxe)	Pond
"Hang a Cross on Me"	2022	9 (Deluxe)	Alex Haygarth, Nick Allbrook
"Neon River"	2024	Stung!	Sam Kristofski
"(I'm) Stung"	2024	Stung!	Pond
"So Lo"	2024	Stung!	Alejandro Crawford
"Terrestrials"	2026	Terrestrials	Jesse Taylor Smith
"Two Hands"	2026	Terrestrials	Sam Kristofski, Pond
"Through the Heather"	2026	Terrestrials	Albert Pritchard
"Skyworks"	2026	Terrestrials	Stephanie Senior
