= Edge of the World (disambiguation) =

Edge of the World is a 2006 album by Glenn Tipton, John Entwistle, and Cozy Powell.

Edge of the World or The Edge of the World may also refer to:

== Film and television ==
- The Edge of the World, a 1937 British film directed by Michael Powell
- Edge of the World (2018 film), an American film directed by Randy Redroad
- Edge of the World (2021 film), an adventure drama directed by Michael Haussman
- Edge of the World (The Owl House), a 2022 television episode

== Literature ==
- The Edge of the World (book), a 2014 history book by Michael Pye
- The Edge of the World, a 2009 Terra Incognita novel by Kevin J. Anderson

== Music ==
- Edge of the World (composition), a 2011 concerto by Nico Muhly

=== Albums ===
- The Edge of the World (Billy Bob Thornton album) or the title song, 2003
- The Edge of the World (The Mekons album), 1986
- Edge of the World, by Mark Boals, 2002
- Edge of the World, by Randy Stonehill, 2002
- Edge of the World, by Youngblood Hawke, 2020

=== Songs ===
- "The Edge of the World", a song by DragonForce from Reaching into Infinity, 2017
- "Edge of the World", by Faith No More from The Real Thing, 1989
- "Edge of the World", by Lovebites from Awakening from Abyss, 2017
- "Edge of the world", by Michael Fall and Nils Van Zandt from Turn on your radio, 2013
- Three songs by Pond:
  - "Edge of the World Part 1", from The Weather (2017)
  - "Edge of the World Part 2", from The Weather (2017)
  - "Edge of the World Part 3", from Stung! (2024)
- "Edge of the World", by Runrig from The Big Wheel, 1991
- "Edge of the World", by the Levellers from Hello Pig, 2000
- "Edge of the World", by Within Temptation from Hydra, 2014
- "Edge of the World", by Yvonne Elliman, the theme of Wargames, 1983

=== Others ===
- Edge of the World, cliff in the Tuwaiq Escarpment, Saudi-Arabia

== See also ==
- Flat Earth
- End of the World (disambiguation)
- At the Edge of the World (disambiguation)
- Edge of the Earth (disambiguation)
- World's Edge, an album by Steve Roach
