= End of the world =

End of the world most often refers to:

- The end time in the eschatology of various religions and mythologies
- Apocalyptic and post-apocalyptic fiction, fiction that is concerned with the end of human civilization as we know it
- Global catastrophe scenarios resulting in the destruction of the planet, human extinction, or the end of human civilization

End of the world or The End of the World may also refer to:

== Art ==
- The End of the World, commonly known as The Great Day of His Wrath, an 1853 painting by John Martin
- The End of the World, a lost painting by Francesco Anelli

== Books ==
- The End of the World, 1930 novel by Geoffrey Dennis, winner of the 1930 Hawthornden Prize
- Skulduggery Pleasant: The End of the World, a 2012 novella by Derek Landy

== Films ==
- The End of the World (1916 film), a Danish film
- End of the World (1931 film), based on Omega: The Last Days of the World
- Panic in Year Zero!, a 1962 science fiction film also released under the title End of the World
- End of the World (1977 film), starring Christopher Lee and Sue Lyon
- The End of the World (1992 film), a Portuguese film
- The End of the World (video), a 2003 viral video
- The working title of This Is the End, 2013
- End of the World, 2013, starring Greg Grunberg
- End of the World, 2018, written by Michael Varrati

== Television ==
- "The End of the World", a 1958 episode of Trackdown
- "End of the World", a 1966 episode of The Time Tunnel
- "The End of the World" (Doctor Who), a 2005 episode of Doctor Who
- "End of the World" (Parks and Recreation), a 2011 episode of Parks and Recreation
- Category 7: The End of the World, a 2005 television miniseries
- "The End of the World", an episode of Freddy's Nightmares
- The End of the World (audio drama), a spin-off of Doctor Who
- The End of the World (TV series), a 2013 South Korean TV series directed by Ahn Pan-seok

== Music ==
=== Bands ===
- End of the World (band), (also known as Sekai no Owari) a Japanese rock band formed in Tokyo in 2007

=== Albums ===
- End of the World (album), by Aphrodite's Child, 1968
- The End of the World (Adam and the Plants album), 2015
- The End of the World (Julie London album), 1963
- The End of the World (Mucc album), 2014
- End of the World, an EP by Alex Metric, 2011
- End of the World, an EP by Searows, 2023

=== Songs and other music ===
- "End of the World" (Ash song), 2007
- "End of the World" (Miley Cyrus song), 2025
- "The End of the World" (Skeeter Davis song), 1962
- "The End of the World" (The Cure song), 2004
- "End of the World", a 1978 song from Change of Heart by Eric Carmen
- "It's the End of the World as We Know It (And I Feel Fine)", a 1987 song by R.E.M.
- "To the End of the World", a song on the 1995 Pat Metheny Group album We Live Here
- "End of the World", a 2014 song from Sound of Change by The Dirty Heads
- "The End of the World", a song by Angela from Sora no Koe
- "End of the World", a 2007 song from Smile for Them by Armor for Sleep and the soundtrack for Transformers
- "End of the World", a 2011 bonus track on the German deluxe edition of Panic of Girls by Blondie
- "End of the World", 2007 song by Blackfield from Blackfield II
- "End of the World", a song by the Clubber Lang Band
- "End of the World", a song from 13 Ways to Bleed on Stage by Cold
- "End of the World", a 2009 song from Out of Ashes by Dead by Sunrise
- "The End of the World", a 2004 song from Master of the Moon by Dio
- "The End Of The World", a 2012 song from Christmas Ain't About Me by The Doubleclicks
- "End of the World", a 1997 song from Play by Great Big Sea
- "End of the World", a 2000 song from Duty by Ayumi Hamasaki
- "End of the World", a 2003 song from Modern Artillery by the Living End
- "End of the World", a 2010 song from Above the Noise by McFly
- "End of the World", a 2012 song from Human Again by Ingrid Michaelson
- "End of the World", a 1982 song from Corridors of Power by Gary Moore
- "End of the World", a 2013 song from Picture Show by Neon Trees and Damon Albarn
- "End of the World", a 2008 song from When Angels & Serpents Dance by P.O.D.
- "The End of the World", a 1990 song from Behaviour by the Pet Shop Boys
- "End of the World", a 2005 song from Anxiety by Smile Empty Soul
- "End of the World", a 1995 song by Waltons from their 1995 album Cock's Crow
- "End of the World", a 2011 song by Alex Metric and Charli XCX
- "End of the World", a 2023 song by Tom MacDonald and John Rich
- "Intro (End of the World)", a 2024 song by Ariana Grande
- The End of the World, a 2008 suite in three movements by Joe Hisaishi

== See also ==
- The Cabin at the End of the World, a novel by Paul Tremblay
- The End of the F***ing World, a graphic novel by Charles Forsman
- The End of the F***ing World (sometimes written as The End of the Fucking World), a UK TV show which first aired in 2017
- The End of the World as We Know It (disambiguation)
- End of the Earth (disambiguation)
- Edge of the World (disambiguation)
- Ends of the Earth (disambiguation)
- End of World, a 2023 album by Public Image Ltd
- The ultimate fate of the Earth; see Future of Earth
- End of the World Route, a Chilean tourist route at the southernmost part of the Americas
- A Home at the End of the World (film), 2004
- "It's the End of the World", a 2006 episode of Grey's Anatomy
- Encounters at the End of the World, a 2007 documentary film
- Seeking a Friend for the End of the World, a 2012 film
- Friend of the World, a 2020 film
- AUM: The Cult at the End of the World, a 2023 documentary film
- A Murder at the End of the World, a 2023 American television series
- "Not the End of the World" (song), 2020, by Katy Perry
- "Until the End of the World" (song), 1991, by U2
- World's End (disambiguation)
- Sekai no Owari (disambiguation), Japanese for "end of the world"
- "Waiting for the End of the World", a song by Elvis Costello from My Aim Is True
- The World's End, Fraserburgh, an 18th-century building
