= Cam Avery =

Australian musician (born 1988)

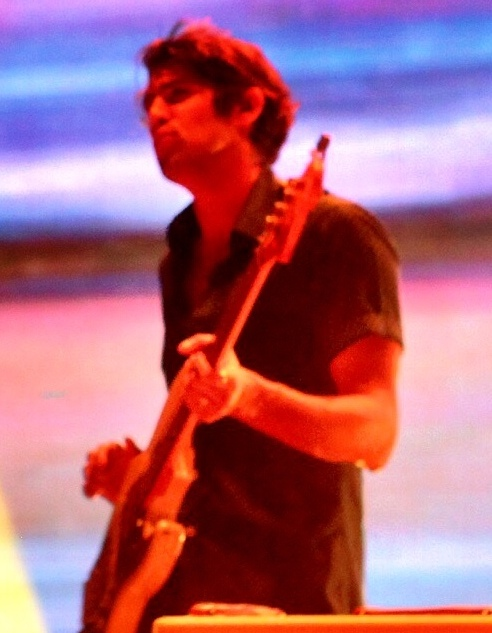
- Avery performing in 2018

Background information
- Born: Cameron Avery; 21 April 1988 (age 37); Fremantle, Western Australia, Australia
- Genres: Psychedelic rock; psychedelic pop; neo-psychedelia; blues rock; garage rock; punk blues
- Occupations: Singer; songwriter; musician
- Instruments: Guitar; bass; vocals; drums; piano; keyboards; harmonica
- Years active: 2010–present
- Labels: Spinning Top
- Member of: Tame Impala (touring member)
- Formerly of: The Growl; Pond

Cameron Avery (born 21 April 1988) is an Australian multi-instrumentalist, musician, singer and songwriter. He is best known as a member of the bands Pond and Tame Impala, and as the frontman for The Growl.

== Early life ==
Born in East Fremantle, Avery moved around north of Perth for a number of years; living in the town of Broome until the age of 6, when his parents split up. At 7 years old, he temporarily settled in Como, and attended Collier Primary School. He claims he never fit in at school, and "wasn't really good at anything besides choir". Avery then moved on to live in his grandmother's house in Leeming with his mother, and brother Eliott.

From an early age, Avery aspired to be a professional Australian rules footballer and play for the West Coast Eagles in the AFL. He spent many years, until about age 16, focusing on golf and was an accomplished tournament junior player with a handicap in his words "about scratch." He began playing guitar aged sixteen and writing songs at seventeen; and as a child occasionally played piano. In his youth, Avery listened extensively to gospel, blues and soul music, particularly musicians Skip James and Son House.

== Career ==
Avery initially started off as a member in the band, Red Shoes Boy, and played drums for singer Abbe May, but gradually moved off to form The Growl.

From guidance off a friend, he eventually bonded with Tame Impala frontman Kevin Parker, and moved in with him. He would then become a part of the Perth music scene; becoming a founding member of Pond, alongside Jay Watson, Jamie Terry and Joe Ryan. Avery would then go on to live with fellow band member and friend Nick Allbrook and create the duo Allbrook/Avery.

As well as playing in Allbrook/Avery and Pond, Avery formed and fronted Fremantle based garage rock band, The Growl, recruiting fellow musicians Clinton Oliver, Marc Earley, Michael Jelinek, Samuel Kuzich and James Ireland. They released their Clever Lever EP in 2011, with their debut What Would Christ Do?? released shortly after in 2013. They also supported Tame Impala around America in 2012 and 2013 and supported English musician Jake Bugg in 2014. In May 2013, it was revealed that Allbrook would leave Tame Impala to pursue other projects. Following the departure, it was confirmed that Avery would replace Allbrook, ultimately becoming a part of the band's new line up.

Not long after joining Tame Impala, he and Parker founded the psychedelic funk band, AAA Aardvark Getdown Services (originally named Kevin Spacey). The formation came about as a fundraiser for another Perth based musician and friend, Felicity Groom, who, whilst heavily pregnant had her car stolen. Avery was featured on bass, along with Parker on drums and fellow musician Cam Parkin on keys. On 21 December 2013, they played a second set under the name The Golden Triangle Municipal Funk Band, with Ben Whitt (former frontman of The Chemist) on guitar and vocals, Avery on bass and Parker on drums. On 22 February 2014 it was announced that AAA Aardvark Getdown Services would play a gig alongside Pond, Peter Bibby, The Silents and Felicity Groom, organised by Fremantle-based record label, Spinning Top.

In 2012 it was revealed that Avery and Allbrook had collaborated with London-based shoegaze band, The Horrors, to record new material for Allbrook/Avery (following their debut Big 'Art, released in 2011). They recorded two LP's in a basement in London with four-fifths of The Horrors' line up. The first record released will be Sunroom, following that will be Wedding Songs. The bands initially came into contact when Allbrook/Avery supported The Horrors on their Australian tour in Laneway 2012. Other musicians such as Jerome Watson from The History of Apple Pie, Holly Warren from Novella and Jason Holt from Spectrum contributed to the record. There is currently no release date.

Pond's sixth album, Man It Feels Like Space Again, was released in January 2015. The record was mixed by Kevin Parker in his Perth studio.

Avery spent the majority of 2016 touring with The Last Shadow Puppets on their Everything You've Come To Expect tour.

After contributing backing vocals to Arctic Monkeys' 2018 album Tranquility Base Hotel & Casino, Avery joined them on tour as both supporting act and multi-instrumentalist in the band's newly expanded live line-up.

=== Solo work ===
On 10 March 2017, Avery released a solo album entitled Ripe Dreams, Pipe Dreams. On announcing the album Avery stated, "I wanted to make something that sounded like the old records I love—Johnny Hartman, Dean Martin, Frank Sinatra, Elvis Presley, Sarah Vaughan, Etta James—the big band stuff with less metaphorical lyrics."

Pitchfork reviewed the album and stated "Ripe Dreams, Pipe Dreams is a focused record with several wonderful songs. It's not novel, nor does it attempt to be, just like those old 45s it so fondly recalls." The Skinny stated the album is "blatantly wearing its influences on its sleeve but heartfelt as all hell." Vendor Culture stated that Ripe Dreams, Pipe Dreams is "an album that's searingly candid but a gritty, cinematic dream nonetheless."

== Personal life ==
In 2018, Avery married model Alyssa Miller. On 29 November 2018 Miller confirmed via her Instagram account the couple had separated.
