= Sekai no Owari (disambiguation) =

Sekai no Owari is a Japanese rock band.

Sekai no Owari (世界の終わり) means "end of the world" in Japanese, may also refer to:

- "Sekai no Owari", a 1996 album by Thee Michelle Gun Elephant
- "Sekai no Owari", a 2003 TV episode of .hack//Legend of the Twilight
- "Sekai no Owari", a 2004 TV episode of Pluster World
- "Sekai no Owari", a 2009 TV episode of Drifting Net Cafe
- "Sekai no Owari", a 2009 TV episode of Clannad
- "Sekai no Owari", a 2002 song my Mucc from the album Hōmura Uta
- "Sekai no Owari", a 2011 song by Ken the 390
- "Sekai no Owari ni", a song by Kokia from Akiko Infinity Kokia: Balance

== See also ==
- End of the world (disambiguation)
