= The Early Years: 2008–2010 =

Compilation album by Pond
- Released: 12 April 2025 (RSD); 4 June 2025 (streaming)
- Recorded: 2008–2010
- Studios: Troy Terrace; Norfolk Basement; Bang Bang Studios; Blackbird Studios
- Genres: Psychedelic rock; psychedelic pop; neo-psychedelia
- Length: 56:44
- Label: Spinning Top
- Producers: Jay Watson; James Ireland; (various co-producers)

Pond chronology
Stung! (2024)	The Early Years: 2008–2010 (2025)	Terrestrials (2026)

The Early Years 2008–2010 is a compilation album by Australian psychedelic rock band Pond, first released on Record Store Day on 12 April 2025, through Spinning Top Records. The double LP contains remastered recordings from the band's first three studio albums: Psychedelic Mango (2009), Corridors of Blissterday (2009), and Frond (2010), all of which were recorded between 2008 and 2010. The album was released on streaming services on 4 June 2025.

== Background ==
Pond released two albums in 2009: Psychedelic Mango and Corridors of Blissterday, through independent local label Badminton Bandit. According to Jay Watson, the band found one of the original CDs and ripped the 16-bit WAV files and mastered them for the first time. Their third album Frond was mastered by Sam Ford, who still had the original pre-mastered mixes. The band considered running them onto tape or mastering them with heaps of gear to try and 'warm' the recordings up, but wanted the sound to remain faithful to the original recordings, which were "made by three bozos with very limited recording knowledge, skill and equipment, but a lot of imagination."

In November 2021, when asked if their first three albums would be released on streaming services, Joe Ryan said that he would prefer a compilation of their early work, saying that they can "troll through the mire and get the golds" after referencing "Sweeping My Mind Tunnel"; a short instrumental off their debut album which included Ryan sweeping a brush whilst he and Nick Allbrook la-la-ed along to a guitar piece. He also stated that no-one in the band had the masters anymore, saying that they were probably "unlabelled in a crate in one of (their) houses". A year later, in October 2022, Nick Allbrook said that the original CDs had been found and affirmed that they were going to release a compilation.

On 5 February 2025, the band teased the album on their Instagram page, which included a snippet of "Psychedelic Mango Vision". Two days later, the album was officially announced, along with the track listing.

=== Track selection ===
11 of the 24 tracks included on Pond's first three albums were included in the compilation; three from Psychedelic Mango, two from Corridors of Blissterday, and six from Frond. In an interview with Record Store Day Australia, Nick Allbrook said that they "tried to include a couple from each album", further stating that "it wasn’t too hard because there’s some absolute garbage on there so it sort of chose itself. There are a few fun ones from Frond but it was easy to choose which to let go. We just listened and whichever one made us cringe first got shot out the window into the land darkness of memory."

Psychedelic Mango	Corridors of Blissterday	Frond
"That Is How We Came"	"Corridors of Blissterday"	"Betty Davis (Will Come Down from the Heavens to Save Us)"
"Psychedelic Mango Vision"	"Caterpillar Mansion"	"Cloud City"
"Gringolet's Drunken Baggage"	"Sweet Loretta"	"Torn Asunder"
"Sweeping My Mind Tunnel"	"Mist in My Brainforest"	"Duck and Clover"
"Don't Look at the Sun or You'll Go Blind"	"Lightning Hip"	"Sunlight Cardigan"
"Mick Manmoose"	"Ascending"	"Annie Orangetree"
"Paisley Adams"		"The Place Behind a Duck"
"Bees"		"Mother Nigeria"
		"Mussels Tonight?"
"Frond"

== Release and packaging ==
The Early Years: 2008–2010 was released as a double LP on 12 April 2025. 1,700 copies of a limited edition "mango vision" vinyl were available on Record Store Day. The vinyl came with a free digital download code, redeemable through Spinning Top's website. The album art features a duck eating a mango. It was photographed by Duncan Wright and was designed by Swim Type, who both previously did the packaging for Allbrook's fourth solo album Manganese. The album was added to streaming services on 4 June 2025.

== Track listing ==
All tracks are written by Pond.

Side one: Psychedelic Mango
No.	Title	Length
1.	"That Is How We Came"	5:53
2.	"Psychedelic Mango Vision"	4:41
3.	"Don't Look at the Sun or You'll Go Blind"	2:47
Total length:		13:21

Side two: Corridors of Blissterday
No.	Title	Length
4.	"Sweet Loretta"	8:04
5.	"Mist in My Brainforest"	7:15
Total length:		15:19

Side three: Frond (part one)
No.	Title	Length
6.	"Betty Davis"	2:09
7.	"Torn Asunder"	4:41
8.	"Annie Orangetree"	3:27
9.	"Mussels Tonight"	4:37
Total length:		14:54

Side four: Frond (part two)
No.	Title	Length
10.	"Sunlight Cardigan"	4:21
11.	"Frond"	8:49
Total length:		13:10; 56:44

== Personnel ==
Adapted from the liner notes.

Pond

- Nick Allbrook
- Jay Watson
- Joseph Ryan

Additional musicians

- Richard Ingham
- Nick Odell
- Anna Lucinda Baxter
- Felicity Groom
- Nathan Savage
- Kevin Parker
- Matthew Saville

Technical personnel

- Jay Watson – production, mastering
- James Ireland – production, mastering
- Sam Ford – engineering, co-production
- Dave Carter – engineering, co-production
- Rob Grant – engineering, co-production
- Kevin Parker – engineering, co-production
- Duncan Wright – photography
- Joseph Dennis – design
