= Pond discography =

Pond discography may refer to:

- Pond (American band) discography
- Pond (Australian band) discography
