= End of the Earth =

End of the Earth

- "End of the Earth", a song by Client Liaison from the 2016 album Diplomatic Immunity
- "End of the Earth", a song by Marina from album the 2019 album Love + Fear

== See also ==
- Ends of the Earth (disambiguation)
- To the Ends of the Earth (disambiguation)
- End of the World (disambiguation)
