= The End of the World as We Know It =

The End of the World as We Know It, or its acronym TEOTWAWKI, may refer to:

- A phrase used in survivalism
- "TEOTWAWKI" (Fear the Walking Dead), a 2017 episode of the TV series Fear the Walking Dead
- "TEOTWAWKI", a 1998 episode in season 3 of the TV series Millennium
- TEOTWAWKI: The End of the World as We Know It, a 1997-1998 novel in the novel series Patriots
- The End of the World as We Know It: New Tales of Stephen King's The Stand, a 2025 anthology based on The Stand by Stephen King

== See also ==
- "It's the End of the World as We Know It (And I Feel Fine)", a 1987 song by R.E.M.
- It's the End of the World as We Know It (EP), a 2012 EP by Steve Aoki
- End of the world (disambiguation)
