= The Growl =

Australian musical group

- Origin: Fremantle, Western Australia, Australia
- Genres: Garage rock; rock and roll; blues rock; punk blues
- Years active: 2011 – 2013 (not confirmed)
- Labels: self-released through Cameron Avery
- Spinoff of: Tame Impala; Pond
- Past members: Cam Avery; Clinton Oliver; Marc Earley; Michael Jelinek; Samuel Kuzich; James Ireland

The Growl is a band from Fremantle, Western Australia, formed by Tame Impala bassist Cam Avery.

== History ==
The Growl is known for having two drummers. Their first EP was mixed by Brian Lucey, who had worked on The Black Keys' album Brothers.

In 2012 and 2013, the band went on an international tour supporting Tame Impala.

After touring the United States and Canada with Tame Impala, The Growl returned to the shores of their homeland, Australia, in April 2013 to mark the release of their debut LP What Would Christ Do?? with a national headline tour. The group has earned multiple WAMI nominations, a Triple J unearthed slot at last year's Big Day Out and a spot on the NME Australian Acts To Watch list in 2013.

== Discography ==
- Cleaver Lever – 2011 (EP)
- What Would Christ Do?? – 2013 (LP)
