= To the Ends of the Earth (disambiguation) =

To the Ends of the Earth is a trilogy of novels by William Golding, published from 1980 to 1989.

To the Ends of the Earth or To the End of the Earth may also refer to:

== Music ==
- To the End of the Earth Tour, a 2013–2014 concert tour by Jessica Mauboy

=== Albums ===
- To the Ends of the Earth, a 1996 album by Monty Alexander's Ivory & Steel
- To the Ends of the Earth (album), a 2002 compilation album by Hillsong United

=== Songs ===
- "To the Ends of the Earth" (song), 1956 song by Nat King Cole
- "To the Ends of the Earth", a 1984 song by English Dogs
- "To the Ends of the Earth", a song by Marty Sampson from the 2003 album Hope
- "To the Ends of the Earth", a song by Blue Sky Black Death from the 2011 album Noir
- "To the Ends of the Earth", a song by Keane from the 2013 album The Best of Keane
- "To the End of the Earth", a 2013 song by Jessica Mauboy
- "Ends of the Earth", a 2012 song by Lord Huron from their 2012 album Lonesome Dreams

== Other uses ==
- To the Ends of the Earth (1948 film), directed by Robert Stevenson
- To the Ends of the Earth (2019 film), directed by Kiyoshi Kurosawa
- To the Ends of the Earth (TV series), a 2005 adaptation of the trilogy of novels of the same name by William Golding
- To the Ends of the Earth, a 1983 book by Ranulph Fiennes
- To the Ends of the Earth, a 2012 book by Maxwell C. Hill, Gary Cook and Noel Hilliam

== See also ==
- End of the Earth (disambiguation)
- Ends of the Earth (disambiguation)
