= Hobo Rocket =

Studio album by Pond
- Released: 2 August 2013 (AUS)
- Recorded: July 2012
- Studio: Dirt Diamond; Poached Egg; (Perth, Western Australia)
- Genre: Psychedelic rock; neo-psychedelia
- Length: 34:00
- Label: Modular
- Producer: Kevin Parker; Pond

Pond chronology
| Beard, Wives, Denim (2012) | Hobo Rocket (2013) | Man It Feels Like Space Again (2015) |

Singles from Hobo Rocket
- 1. "Giant Tortoise" Released: 1 February 2013; 2. "Xanman" Released: 18 June 2013

Hobo Rocket is the fifth studio album by Australian psychedelic rock band Pond, released in Australia on 2 August 2013, through Modular Recordings.

Hobo Rocket appeared at 37th on the ARIA Charts two weeks after release.

== Recording ==
Hobo Rocket is Pond's shortest album by runtime, clocking in at exactly 34 minutes. The album was recorded in July 2012, five months after the release of their previous album, Beard, Wives, Denim. Five of the seven songs were recorded at Dirt Diamond Studios, "Midnight Mass (At the Market Street Payphone)" and "Hobo Rocket" were recorded at Poached Egg Studios. The album was engineered by Clint Oliver, mastered by Rob Grant at Poon's Head Studio, and was co-produced by Kevin Parker and Pond.

== Release ==
Two singles were released as free digital downloads to promote the album. The first, "Giant Tortoise", was released on 15 May 2013 alongside the announcement of the new album. The second single, "Xanman", was released on 18 June 2013.

Hobo Rocket was released in Australia on 2 August 2013, in the United Kingdom and Europe on 5 August 2012, and in the United States and day later.

== Critical reception ==
Professional ratings
Aggregate scores
| Source | Rating |
|---|---|
| AnyDecentMusic? | 6.9/10 |
| Metacritic | 71/100 |
Review scores
| Source | Rating |
| AllMusic | 3.5/5 stars |
| Consequence | C+ |
| DIY | 8/10 |
| Exclaim! | 8/10 |
| Guardian Australia | 3/5 stars |
| The Independent | 4/5 stars |
| The Line of Best Fit | 7/10 |
| MusicOMH | 3.5/5 stars |
| NME | 4/5 stars |
| Now | 3/5 |
| Pitchfork | 5.9/10 |
| Sputnikmusic | 3.9/5 |
| Tiny Mix Tapes | 2.5/5 stars |

Hobo Rocket received generally positive reviews from music critics. At Metacritic, which assigns a normalised rating out of 100 to reviews from professional publications, the release received an average score of 71, based on 22 reviews, indicating "generally favourable reviews".

== Live performances ==
Following the release of Hobo Rocket, Pond toured Australia in December 2013, performing in Perth, Adelaide, Brisbane, Melbourne, and Sydney across nine days. The band performed numerous shows across Australia in February and April 2014, and supported Arctic Monkeys during their tour of Australia and New Zealand. In May, they performed at Primavera in Barcelona, and in June, they performed at Field Day in London. According to Setlist.fm, "Giant Tortoise" is one of the band's most played songs live. The rest of the songs are fairly uncommon; "Aloneaflameaflower" was played during their 2024 tour, appearing for the first time since 2019, "Whatever Happened to the Million Head Collide?" was last played in 2020, "Midnight Mass (At the Market Street Payphone)" in 2018, and "Xanman" and "O Dharma" in 2014. The titular track, "Hobo Rocket", has never been played live. (Note: Live performances of songs from Hobo Rocket: "Whatever Happened to the Million Head Collide?": "Xanman": "O Dharma": "Aloneaflameaflower": "Giant Tortoise": "Midnight Mass (At the Market Street Payphone)":)

== Track listing ==
Hobo Rocket
| No. | Title | Writer(s) | Length |
|---|---|---|---|
| 1. | "Whatever Happened to the Million Head Collide?" | Nick Allbrook; Jay Watson | 4:42 |
| 2. | "Xanman" | Allbrook; Watson | 5:50 |
| 3. | "O Dharma" | Joe Ryan; Watson; Allbrook | 4:56 |
| 4. | "Aloneaflameaflower" | Allbrook | 4:32 |
| 5. | "Giant Tortoise" | Watson; Allbrook; Ryan | 4:12 |
| 6. | "Hobo Rocket" | Ryan; Cowboy John | 3:35 |
| 7. | "Midnight Mass (At the Market Street Payphone)" | Allbrook; Watson | 6:13 |
| Total length: | | | 34:00 |

== Personnel ==
Pond

- Nick Allbrook – vocals (tracks 1–5, 7), guitars (tracks 1–2, 4, 7), synthesiser (tracks 1, 3–4, 7), bass (tracks 3, 5–7), lead guitar (track 6)
- Jay Watson – guitars (tracks 1–2, 5, 7), piano (tracks 1, 3), keys (tracks 2, 6), vocals (tracks 3, 5), backing vocals (track 3), electric guitar (track 3), synthesiser (tracks 3–7), drums (tracks 3, 7), zither (track 5), tambourine (track 7)
- Joe Ryan – bass (tracks 1, 4), guitars (track 2), vocals (track 3), backing vocals (track 3), acoustic guitar (track 3), synthesiser (track 3), sitar (tracks 3, 6), rhythm guitar (track 6), drums (track 6), tambourine (track 6)
- Cam Avery – drums (tracks 1–2, 4–5), slide guitar (track 3)
- Pond – backing vocals (track 2)

Additional

- Dave Parkin – saxophone (track 1)
- Cowboy John – vocals (track 6)

Technical personnel

- Kevin Parker – production and mixing
- Rob Grant – mastering
- Clint Oliver – engineering
- Amber Bateup – photography

== Charts ==
| Chart (2013) | Peak position |
|---|---|
| Australian Albums (ARIA) | 37 |
| Australian Physical Albums (ARIA) | 33 |
| Australian Digital Albums (ARIA) | 41 |
