= Ends of the Earth =

Ends of the Earth may refer to:

- Extreme points of Earth
- Ends of the Earth (Indo-European)
- "Ends of the Earth" (DC Comics), a Wonder Woman storyline
- "Ends of the Earth" (Marvel Comics), a Spider-Man storyline
- The Ends of the Earth (novel), a novel by Valerio Massimo Manfredi
- The Ends of the Earth (short story collection), a story collection by Lucius Shepard
- The Ends of the Earth (play), by Morris Panych
- "Ends of the Earth" (song), a 2024 song by Ty Myers
- "Ends of the Earth," a song by Lord Huron from their 2012 album Lonesome Dreams
- "Ends of the Earth," a song by Dirty Three from their 1998 album Ocean Songs
- Ends of the Earth, a 2026 album by The Longest Johns

== See also ==
- End of the Earth (disambiguation)
- To the Ends of the Earth (disambiguation)
- End of the world (disambiguation)
