= At the Edge of the World =

At the Edge of the World may refer to:

- At the Edge of the World (collection), collection of fantasy short stories by Irish writer Lord Dunsany
- At the Edge of the World (1927 film), a German silent drama
- At the Edge of the World (2008 film), a documentary about the efforts of activist Paul Watson to hinder whaling in Antarctica
- At the Edge of the World (album), seventh studio album by the industrial rock band Godhead
- Crispin: At the Edge of the World, novel released in 2006 by Edward Irving Wortis

== See also ==
- Edge of the World (disambiguation)
