= Edge of the Earth (disambiguation) =

Edge of the Earth may refer to:

- Edge of the Earth (Thirty Seconds to Mars song), a 2003 song by Thirty Seconds to Mars
- Edge of the Earth (album), a 2011 album by Sylosis
- The Edge of the Earth, an EP by Switchfoot
- Edge of the Earth (The Beaches song) a 2024 song by The Beaches

== See also ==
- Edge of the World (disambiguation)
