= 9 (Pond album) =

Studio album by Pond
- Released: 1 October 2021
- Genre: Psychedelic pop; dance-punk; neo-psychedelia
- Length: 39:09
- Label: Spinning Top
- Producer: Pond

Pond chronology
Tasmania (2019)	9 (2021)	Stung! (2024)

Singles from 9
- 1. "Pink Lunettes" Released: 31 March 2021; 2. "America's Cup" Released: 20 May 2021; 3. "Toast" Released: 1 July 2021; 4. "Human Touch" Released: 3 September 2021

Singles from 9 (Deluxe)
- 1. "Lights of Leeming" Released: 4 March 2022

9 is the ninth studio album by Australian psychedelic rock band Pond. It was released on 1 October 2021 by Spinning Top Records. The album was produced by the band themselves, the first since 2012's Beard, Wives, Denim to not be co-produced by former member Kevin Parker, with bandmates Jay Watson and James Ireland on mixing duties.

9 became the band's first ARIA top ten album, debuting at number 6 on the chart.

A deluxe version of the album was released on 20 May 2022.

== Background ==
The first single, "Pink Lunettes", was released on 31 March 2021, prior to the album's announcement. The album was announced on 20 May 2021, alongside second and lead single, "America's Cup". Upon announcement, frontman Nick Allbrook said "We'd settled into a pretty tight routine with the last few albums and wanted to shake a boat with this so we started off with filling a few tape reels with some absolutely heinous improvised sonic babble which, after much sifting, became the first few songs of the album. We also wanted to up the tempo. The last few albums have a neat little mantra or repetitive theme. If I was forced to find something like that in 9, I guess it would be 'biography' or 'observation' - a lot of the lyrics seem to focus on single people's lives, or the lives of small moments or small things when you zoom real close up and they reveal something deeper."

== Critical reception ==
Professional ratings
Aggregate scores
Source	Rating
Metacritic	72/100
Review scores
Source	Rating
NME	4/5 stars
Rolling Stone Australia	4/5 stars

At Metacritic, which assigns a normalized rating out of 100 to reviews from professional publications, 9 received an average score of 72 based on six reviews, indicating "generally favourable reviews".

Rhys Buchanan from NME said "The band that keeps on giving, having pushed their self-proclaimed "polished psych-pop" to its outer reaches, reinvent themselves yet again." James Di Fabrizio from Rolling Stone Australia said "At 9's best, it's an exhilarating ride through multiple ideas all being born at once. While it will never be Pond's most focused record, it's arguably more interesting to hear the band push forward into new territory than rehash well-trodden ideas."

== Track listing ==
All tracks are written by Nicholas Allbrook, Jay Watson, Joseph Ryan, James Ireland, and Jamie Terry.

No.	Title	Length
1.	"Song for Agnes"	4:14
2.	"Human Touch"	3:20
3.	"America's Cup"	3:50
4.	"Take Me Avalon I'm Young"	3:30
5.	"Pink Lunettes"	5:46
6.	"Czech Locomotive"	4:50
7.	"Rambo"	5:03
8.	"Gold Cup / Plastic Sole"	4:26
9.	"Toast"	4:10
Total length:		39:09

2022 DLX Edition
No.	Title	Length
10.	"Lights of Leeming"	3:14
11.	"My Funny Serpentine"	3:34
12.	"The TAB Took My Baby Away"	3:03
13.	"Hang a Cross On Me (ft. Cowboy John)"	4:45
Total length:		53:05

== Personnel ==
Pond

- Nick Allbrook – lead vocals, guitar, synthesizer, production
- Jay Watson – vocals, bass, guitar, synthesizer, production, mixing
- Shiny Joe Ryan – guitar, synthesizer, production
- Jamie Terry – synthesizer, production
- James Ireland – drums, keyboards, programming, production, mixing

Additional personnel

- David Ives – mastering
- Maud Nadal – additional vocals on "Song for Agnes"
- Jesse Kotansky – strings on "Song for Agnes", "Take Me Avalon I'm Young", "Gold Cup / Plastic Soul" and "Toast"
- Christian Ruggiero – saxophone on "Song for Agnes" and "Human Touch"
- Amaya Courtis – additional vocals on "Take Me Avalon I'm Young" and "Rambo"
- Laurel – additional vocals on "Czech Locomotive"
- Evelyn Ida Morris – piano on "Gold Cup / Plastic Soul"
- Brod Madden-Scott – live instrumental engineering on "America's Cup", "Czech Locomotive" and "Toast"
- Cowboy John – vocals on "Hang a Cross On Me"
- Braulio Amado – artwork and layout

== Charts ==
Chart performance for 9
Chart (2021)	Peak position
Australian Albums (ARIA)	6
Scottish Albums (OCC)	93
UK Independent Albums (OCC)	18

== Release history ==
Release history and details for 9
Region	Date	Format	Edition	Label	Catalogue	Ref.
Various	1 October 2021	Digital download; streaming, CD, LP	Standard	Spinning Top	STR025CD	
Australia	20 May 2022	Digital download; streaming, CD, LP	Deluxe	Spinning Top	STR025DLXLP	
