= Beard, Wives, Denim =

Studio album by Pond
- Released: 2 March 2012 (AUS)
- Recorded: April–November 2010
- Studios: Zampatti Farm (Eagle Bay, Western Australia); Pond's tour bus (United States)
- Genres: Psychedelic rock; neo-psychedelia; indie rock
- Length: 54:53
- Label: Modular
- Producers: Kevin Parker; Pond

Pond chronology
Frond (2010)	Beard, Wives, Denim (2012)	Hobo Rocket (2013)

Singles from Beard, Wives, Denim
- 1. "Fantastic Explosion of Time" Released: 6 December 2011; 2. "Moth Wings" Released: 31 January 2012; 3. "Mystery" Released: 22 February 2012; 4. "Moth Wings" / "You Broke My Cool" Released: 28 May 2012 (UK)

Beard, Wives, Denim is the fourth studio album by Australian psychedelic rock band Pond, released in Australia on 2 March 2012, through Modular Recordings. Most of the album was recorded over two weeks at Zampatti Farm in Eagle Bay, Western Australia in April 2010, which is pictured on the album cover. The album was preceded by three singles: "Fantastic Explosion of Time", "Moth Wings", and "Mystery".

The album was often positively compared to Tame Impala's Innerspeaker, as band members Nick Allbrook and Jay Watson were touring members of the project, and Kevin Parker was the album's co-producer alongside the band. The album received generally positive reviews, and was praised for its fast-paced and upbeat nature, whilst also described in more mixed reviews as "bipolar". The mid-song jams found on every song received somewhat mixed reactions. Critics from NME, The Fly and Uncut named the album amongst the best of 2012, with NME ranking it seventh in their annual ranking. Beard Wives, Denim was considered Pond's 'breakthrough album', with previous releases garnering minimal mainstream attention. The album became the band's first to chart, spending a week at 64th on the ARIA Charts.

== Background ==
Pond was formed in 2008 under a mulberry tree in Daglish, Western Australia by Nick Allbrook, Jay Watson and Joe Ryan. Shortly after their formation, they recorded their debut album, Psychedelic Mango, in their living room and released it in January 2009 under local label, Badminton Bandit. Their second studio album, Corridors of Blissterday released five months later.

In May 2010, Kevin Parker's musical project, Tame Impala, which Allbrook and Watson were live members of, released its debut album, Innerspeaker, to critical acclaim. Pond's third studio album, Frond, was released in September 2010 through Hole in the Sky, and received some attention due to the similarity in sound and lineup, however, they were largely disregarded as a Tame Impala side project. On 6 December 2011, it was announced that the band had joined record label Modular Recordings alongside a free digital download of the album's first single, "Fantastic Explosion of Time".

== Recording ==
A majority of the album was recorded across two weeks in April 2010 at a friend's farmhouse on Zampatti Farm in Eagle Bay, Western Australia. The house had three rooms, with the bedroom serving as the studio and the bathroom as the vocal booth. Because of this, the ten people staying at the farmhouse slept outside in tents. The album was mixed by Rob Grant and produced by Kevin Parker at Poon's Head Studio in Perth.

The album's liner notes give explanations about some of the songs: "Sorry I Was Under the Sky" is about a 'powerful experience' Joe Ryan had in Osaka Harbour, almost causing them to miss a performance by The Flaming Lips. "You Broke My Cool" is about a 'powerful experience' that Nick Allbrook had in Japan, where he "had his cool broken in a gekko suit by The Flaming Lips and ten thousand silent peace signs." He later expanded upon this in 2024, explaining that he had taken lysergic acid before getting on the stage in the costume, and that he cried afterwards. "Leisure Pony" and "Dig Brother" are both about their old home at 46 Troy Terrace. The first is about Joe Ryan's unemployment, and the latter is about Joe Ryan never doing the dishes. "Eye Pattern Blindness" was recorded in one morning, Joe Ryan woke up with the chords and Jay Watson wrote the rest of the song. "Moreno's Blend" was recorded on the porch, and was "Pond's last attempt to score free coffee from Moreno."

== Release and packaging ==
Three singles were released as free digital downloads to promote the album. The first, "Fantastic Explosion of Time", was released on 6 December 2011 alongside the announcement that they had signed with Modular Recordings. The second single, "Moth Wings", was released on 31 January 2012, and the third single, "Mystery", was released on 22 February 2012.

Beard, Wives, Denim was released in Australia on 2 March 2012, in the United Kingdom and Europe on 5 March 2012, and in the United States a day later. The cover contains a polaroid picture of Allbrook, Watson and Ryan standing along a fence line on Zampatti Farm, where a majority of the album was recorded. The album's liner notes contains explanations about each song, often comical in nature, along with various other pictures from their two weeks on the farm.

On 7 March, "Pond in a Park" was released as a B-side to the album. On 10 May, Pond released a cover of Smokey Robinson and the Miracles' single, "Tears of a Clown". Both songs were available for digital download, but have not been re-released physically, or on streaming services.

In May 2012, two months after the album's release, Nick Allbrook announced that he would be leaving Tame Impala to "screw his head back on" and focus on Pond.

== Critical reception ==
Professional ratings
Aggregate scores
Source	Rating
AnyDecentMusic?	7.1/10
Metacritic	77/100
Review scores
Source	Rating
AllMusic	4/5 stars
Consequence	6/10
DIY	7/10
Exclaim!	6/10
MusicOMH	2.5/5 stars
NME	4.5/5 stars
Pitchfork	7/10
Guardian Australia	4/5 stars

Beard, Wives, Denim received generally positive reviews from music critics. At Metacritic, which assigns a normalised rating out of 100 to reviews from professional publications, the release received an average score of 77, based on 10 reviews, indicating "generally favourable reviews". Rebecca Schiller of NME praised Beard, Wives, Denim, describing the opening song, "Fantastic Explosion of Time", as "explosive and brilliant, but also dwarfed by everything that follows." Michael Hann of Guardian Australia positively compared the band to Kevin Parker's Tame Impala, saying "it's different enough to feel like a companion piece rather than a knock-off" and that the album is "more the sound of a rock band kicking back, and less alienated". Jason Lymangrover of AllMusic also compared the band to Tame Impala, saying that songs "'When It Explodes" and "Sorry I Was Under The Sky" were good enough to be "B-sides for Innerspeaker", further describing Pond as "an incorrigible younger sibling that is determined to learn by making mistakes."

Ben Hogwood of MusicOMH wrote that whilst the album was "rarely dull", "unless you are in the company of some helpful stimulants, it is ultimately frustrating and chaotic." Hogwood also criticised the "sudden mood swings" on the album, notably on "Sun and Sea and You", which "(broke) up an excellent riff that (promised) much with some dreamscape verses that (stopped) the momentum dead." Alex Young of Consequence said that the outro to the album's tenth track, "Mystery", was "a drawn-out ending of sheer fuzz and feedback." Jack Parker of DIY wrote that the record "doesn’t think too much and doesn’t expect the listener to think too much", further writing that "If you do think too long and hard about what’s going on, you’ll end up coming up with unanswerable questions such as ‘what are they singing about?’ and ‘where is the structure?’"

The album drew many comparisons to Tame Impala's debut album Innerspeaker due to the shared line-up and production, with Zach Kelly of Pitchfork writing that Pond "welcomingly recontextualizes that sound while offering it in easily digestible bites." Jason Lymangrover of AllMusic saying that the records share "the same tape echo, leslie speaker wobble, and vintage guitar tones." Alex Young of Consequence wrote that Pond "adds a freeform rock flavour distinctly their own", further praising the band for being "more willing to experiment and (creating) a sound rich in spirited excitement." Rebecca Schiller of NME called the album "miles better than Innerspeaker, and quite possibly the best album released so far this year."

=== Accolades ===
At the 2012 EG Awards, Beard Wives Denim was nominated for best album, losing out to Alpine's A is for Alpine. Pond were also nominated for best band, losing to The Temper Trap. NME named Beard, Wives, Denim as the seventh best album of 2012 and "You Broke My Cool" as the 25th best track of the year, The Fly ranked it 18th, and Uncut in 56th.

Publication	Accolade	Year	Rank
The Age	EG Awards of 2012 – Best Album	2012	Nominated
NME	Best Albums of 2012	2012	7
The Fly	Top 50 Albums of 2012	2012	18
Uncut	Top 75 New Albums of 2012	2012	56

== Live performances ==
Following the release of Beard, Wives, Denim, Pond toured the United States with Oberhofer from 6 March to 13 April 2012, including performances at the Savannah Music Festival and South by Southwest, before completing six Australian shows from 19 to 28 April, finishing in their home city of Perth. On 5 April 2012, during their tour of the United States, Pond performed "Pond in a Park", "You Broke My Cool", "When It Explodes" and "Eye Pattern Blindness" on KEXP-FM. A majority of songs from Beard, Wives, Denim are rarely played live. According to Setlist.fm, "Moth Wings" was last played in 2022 and "Eye Pattern Blindness" in 2024 in Melbourne and Sydney. "Fantastic Explosion of Time" was played live in Boston on 12 November 2024, for the first time since 2014. "Elegant Design", "Sorry I Was Under the Sky", "Sun and Sea and You", "Mystery", and "Moreno's Blend" have never been played live. All other songs haven't featured on a setlist since at least 2017. (Note: Live performances of songs from Beard, Wives, Denim: "Moth Wings": "Eye Pattern Blindness": Other performances: "Fantastic Explosion of Time", "When It Explodes", "Allergies", "You Broke My Cool", "Leisure Pony", "Dig Brother" and "Pond in a Park".)

== Track listing ==
No.	Title	Writer(s)	Lead vocals	Length
1.	"Fantastic Explosion of Time"	Jay Watson; Nick Allbrook	Allbrook	4:26
2.	"When It Explodes"	Joe Ryan; Allbrook	Allbrook	5:25
3.	"Elegant Design"	Watson	Allbrook; Watson	4:09
4.	"Sorry I Was Under the Sky"	Ryan; Allbrook	Ryan	2:48
5.	"Sun and Sea and You"	Allbrook	Allbrook	4:01
6.	"Allergies"	Watson; Pond	Watson	4:27
7.	"You Broke My Cool"	Allbrook	Allbrook	3:49
8.	"Moth Wings"	Watson	Allbrook; Watson	3:22
9.	"Leisure Pony"	Watson; Pond	Watson	3:29
10.	"Mystery"	Watson	Watson	4:06
11.	"Dig Brother"	Ryan	Ryan	4:38
12.	"Eye Pattern Blindness"	Watson; Ryan	Allbrook; Watson	5:58
13.	"Moreno's Blend"	Ryan	Ryan	4:15
Total length:				54:53

== Personnel ==
Pond

- Nick Allbrook – vocals, flute, keys, guitar, slide guitar, bass, drums
- Jay Watson – vocals, guitar, keys, synth, backing vocals, drums
- Joe Ryan – vocals, guitar, 12-string guitar, slide guitar, bass, backing vocals
- Jamie Terry – keys, organ, bass
- Kevin Parker – drums

Technical personnel

- Kevin Parker – producer and mastering
- Rob Grant – mixer and mastering
- Sam Ford – engineer

== Charts ==
Chart (2012)	Peak position
Australian Albums (ARIA)	64
Australian Physical Albums (ARIA)	70
