= Akiko Infinity Kokia: Balance =

Studio album by Kokia
- Released: March 18, 2009 (Japan); May 26, 2009 (North America); May 20, 2009 (Europe)
- Recorded: 2008–2009
- Genre: J-pop, folk
- Length: 59:54
- Label: Anco&co, Wasabi Records
- Producer: Kokia

Kokia chronology
Music Gift (2008)	Akiko Infinity Kokia: Balance (2009)	Coquillage: The Best Collection II (2009)

Akiko Infinity Kokia: Balance (stylised as AKIKO∞KOKIA ～balance～) is Kokia's ninth equal studio album, released simultaneously with Kokia Infinity Akiko: Balance in March 2009.

Two songs from the album feature on Kokia's greatest hits collection Coquillage: The Best Collection II: "Infinity" and "Sekai no Owari ni."

To promote the albums, Kokia embarked on her first world tour, Infinity. The tour, beginning in April in Japan, went for two months, with Kokia visiting Belgium, France, Germany, Ireland and Poland.

== Conception ==
When Kokia wrote music throughout her career, she began to notice a division in her song-writing when she wanted to write songs about herself. There was a difference between songs written as "Kokia" (the musician), and "Akiko" (the person herself). Kokia described the simultaneously released album concept as "two different existences that live off of each other."

While Kokia Infinity Akiko is sung as a standard Kokia studio album, Akiko Infinity Kokia deals is sung from the view of "Akiko," the treasured glimpses of her inner self that began coming through in her musical persona.

One song features on both albums, "Infinity," however it is arranged is completely different on both discs. The version on this album was described "tender feelings, as if it were sung for you in front of a fireplace," as opposed to the "magnificently arranged" sound of the Kokia Infinity Akiko version.

== Recording ==
The bulk of the album recording took place between December 2008 and early February 2009. Between December 15–17, Kokia recorded five tracks in single takes backed with studio musicians.

While some of the songs on the album were written specifically for it, many of them are older, unpublished songs. On the 6th of January, Kokia replaced three older songs originally intended for the albums with newer tracks she had written.

"Wasuremono" is one of Kokia's oldest songs. It was originally performed in 1998 and 1999 in live concerts for her debut album Songbird. "Ōki na Senaka" was performed at Kokia's special Akiko Yoshiba Hakigatari Live: Piano to Akisuke concert in late 2004. A song from Kokia Infinity Akiko, "Kono Mune no Kurushimi ga Itooshii Hodo ni Ikite," (この胸の苦しみが愛おしいほどに生きて, Living to the Point Where I Love This Pain in My Heart) was also performed at this night.

Unlike the songs on Kokia Infinity Akiko, not many of the songs are mentioned by Kokia in her blog (either during the writing process, or post-concert comments). However, "Vintage Love" was mentioned in June 2006 as being inspired by the film Tokyo Tower.

On January 26, the final song for the album was written ("Hajimari"), and on February 6, both albums were recorded in their entirety.

== Release ==
The album was initially released in Japan in March 2009, through Ancoro. Unlike Kokia's previous albums, it was not released to music retailers: it was only available online through Kokia's Ancoro official website, as well as through digital downloads. The album was released two months later in France, during Kokia's European tour. The French version compiled both Kokia Infinity Akiko and Akiko Infinity Kokia together into a single 2-CD set.

Due to the non-standard release method, the album was ineligible to chart on Oricon's album charts.

Akiko Infinity Kokia was re-released in France as a part of a 3-CD set called Kokia Collection 2, on December 2, 2009. The box set also featured Kokia Infinity Akiko: Balance and Fairy Dance: Kokia Meets Ireland.

== Track listing ==
All songs written by Kokia.

No.	Title	Arranger(s)	Length
1.	"Wasuremono (忘れ物, Forgotten Thing)"	Yasuhisa Yamamoto	6:53
2.	"Ōki na Senaka (大きな背中, Great Back)"	Kiyohide Ura	4:50
3.	"Obaa-chan (おばあちゃん, Grandma)"	Kokia	3:36
4.	"Sarusuberi no Yureru Koro (サルスベリの揺れる頃, When the Crape Myrtles Sway)"	Kokia	5:36
5.	"Home"	Kokia	6:14
6.	"Vintage Love"	Kokia	6:11
7.	"Bridge"	Ryosuke Nakanishi	5:48
8.	"Hajimari (はじまり, Beginning)"	Kokia	4:05
9.	"Infinity"	Yamamoto	6:06
10.	"Sekai no Owari ni (世界の終わりに, At the End of the World)"	Ura	5:24
11.	"Tsumihoroboshi no Uta (罪滅ぼしの歌, Atonement Song)"	Ura	5:11

== Personnel ==
- Takeshi Arai – guitar (#2)
- Katsuhiko "Chara" Asano – mixing engineer (#7, #9)
- Toshihiko Fujimi – publicist
- Takashi Furuta – drums (#10)
- Yuya Haraguchi – acoustic/electric guitars (#1)
- Shigeyuki Hirano – director, mixing engineer (#1, #3–5, #8)
- Noriko Inose – photographer
- Hiroko Ishida – viola (#9)
- Nao Ishizaka – hair designer
- Ayako Karasawa – cello (#9)
- Emiko Kato – licence management
- Atsushi Kawahata – piano (#8)
- Hiroshi Kawasaki – mastering engineer
- Kokia – arranger (#3–6, #8), design/styling, songwriter, piano (#3), producer, vocal chorus arrangement, vocals
- Masahiro Kuniyoshi – download sales
- Kazuhiro Matsuo – acoustic guitar (#4), guitar (#10)
- Tsuyoshi Miyagawa – drums (#2)

"Wasuremono"
The first track of the album, showing the introspective, subtle arrangement of the album.

"Infinity"
The title track of the album, in its acoustic Akiko Infinity Kokia form.

- Kaori Mori – make-up
- Ryosuke Nakanishi – arrangement/programming (#7)
- Kenji Nozaki – package sales
- Hiroyasu Okada – siku (#5)
- Mio Okamura Strings (#2)
- Yoshikazu Sasahara – mixing engineer (#2, #6, #10–11)
- Katsuhiko Sato – acoustic guitar (#9)
- Shigeki Selizawa – washtub bass (#9)
- Shin Eai-Sung – violin (#9)
- Ryoji Takai – washtub bass (#2, #10)
- Gen Tanabe – acoustic/electric guitar (#5), noise guitar (#1, #5)
- Tetsuya Toyama – guitars (#7)
- Hanako Uesato – violin (#9)
- Kiyohide Ura – arrangement (#2, #10–11), keyboard (#2, #10), piano (#6, #11), saxophone (#10)
- Yasuhisa Yamamoto (Usatrene Records) – arrangement (#1, #5, #12), cymbals (#5), mixing engineer (#1, #5), percussion/recording (#1, #12)
