= Frond (album) =

Studio album by Pond
- Released: 6 September 2010
- Recorded: 2009
- Studio: Blackbird Sound Studios, Perth
- Genre: Psychedelic rock; psychedelic pop; neo-psychedelia
- Length: 41:36
- Label: Hole in the Sky
- Producer: Sam Ford

Pond chronology
Corridors of Blisterday (2009)	Frond (2010)	Beard, Wives, Denim (2012)

Singles from Frond
- 1. "Cloud City" Released: 22 February 2010; 2. "Annie Orangetree" Released: 21 April 2010

Frond is the third studio album by Australian psychedelic rock band Pond, released in Australia on 6 September 2010, through Hole in the Sky.

Remastered versions of "Betty Davis (Will Come Down from the Heavens to Save Us)", "Torn Asunder", "Annie Orangetree", "Mussels Tonight?", "Sunlight Cardigan", and "Frond" were included on The Early Years: 2008–2010, which released on 12 April 2025.

== Track listing ==
All tracks are written by Pond.

No.	Title	Length
1.	"Betty Davis (Will Come Down from the Heavens to Save Us)"	2:08
2.	"Cloud City"	3:15
3.	"Torn Asunder"	4:44
4.	"Duck and Clover"	4:13
5.	"Sunlight Cardigan"	4:24
6.	"Annie Orangetree"	3:29
7.	"The Place Behind a Duck"	1:53
8.	"Mother Nigeria"	3:57
9.	"Mussels Tonight?"	4:43
10.	"Frond"	8:50
Total length:		41:36

== Personnel ==
Pond

- Nick Allbrook (credited as Paisley Adams)
- Jay Watson (credited as Wesley Goldtouch)
- Joe Ryan (credited as Joseph Orion McJam)

Additional

- Flick Groom – wailing (track 8)
- Rachael Aquilina – violin (track 10)
- Allie Clarke – cello (track 10)

Technical

- Sam Ford – producer and mixer
- Dave Cooley – mastering
