= Man It Feels Like Space Again =

Studio album by Pond
- Released: 23 January 2015
- Recorded: 2013–2014
- Genres: Psychedelic rock; psychedelic pop; neo-psychedelia
- Length: 45:08
- Label: Caroline Records
- Producers: Kevin Parker; Pond

Pond chronology
Hobo Rocket (2013)	Man It Feels Like Space Again (2015)	The Weather (2017)

Singles from Man It Feels Like Space Again
- 1. "Elvis' Flaming Star" Released: 19 October 2014; 2. "Sitting Up on Our Crane" Released: 16 December 2014; 3. "Zond" Released: 11 January 2015

Man It Feels Like Space Again is the sixth studio album by Australian psychedelic rock band Pond, released on 23 January 2015 in Australia.

== Critical reception ==
Professional ratings
Aggregate scores
Source	Rating
Metacritic	78/100
Review scores
Source	Rating
Head Heritage	Positive
AllMusic	3.5/5 stars
DIY	4/5 stars
Drowned in Sound	7/10
Exclaim!	8/10
The Guardian	5/5 stars
musicOMH	4/5 stars
NME	8/10 stars
Renowned for Sound	4/5 stars
Rolling Stone Australia	4/5 stars

Man It Feels Like Space Again received largely positive reviews from contemporary music critics. At Metacritic, which assigns a normalized rating out of 100 to reviews from mainstream critics, the album received an average score of 78, based on 18 reviews, which indicates "generally favorable reviews".

=== Accolades ===
Publication	Accolade	Year	Rank
NME	NME'S Albums of the Year 2015	2015	34

== Track listing ==
No.	Title	Writer(s)	Lead vocals	Length
1.	"Waiting Around for Grace"	Nick Allbrook; Jay Watson; Joe Ryan	Allbrook	5:10
2.	"Elvis' Flaming Star"	Allbrook; Watson; Joe Ryan	Allbrook	3:25
3.	"Holding Out for You"	Ryan	Ryan	4:44
4.	"Zond"	Allbrook; Watson	Allbrook	4:04
5.	"Heroic Shart"	Allbrook	Allbrook	4:05
6.	"Sitting Up on Our Crane"	Watson	Watson	6:00
7.	"Outside Is the Right Side"	Allbrook; Watson	Allbrook	5:10
8.	"Medicine Hat"	Ryan	Ryan	4:08
9.	"Man It Feels Like Space Again"	Allbrook; Watson; Ryan	Allbrook	8:22
Total length:				45:08

== Personnel ==
Pond

- Nick Allbrook – mixing, engineering, design, layout; vocals (1, 2, 4, 5, 7, 9), guitar (6), background vocals (8)
- Jay Watson – mixing, engineering, design, layout; drums (1–5, 7, 9), vocals (6), bass guitar (8)
- Joseph Ryan – mixing, engineering, design, layout; vocals (3, 8), guitar (1, 7), background vocals (2, 9), synthesizer programming (4)
- Jamie Terry – mixing, engineering, design, layout; keyboards (1), bass guitar (3), background vocals (8)

Additional personnel

- Rob Grant – mastering
- Kevin Parker – mixing, engineering
- Lukas Glickman – engineering
- Bjenny Montero – artwork, design, layout

== Charts ==
Chart (2015)	Peak position
Australian Albums (ARIA)	15
Australian Physical Albums (ARIA)	11
Australian Digital Albums (ARIA)	27
