= Nick Allbrook =

Australian musician (born 1987)

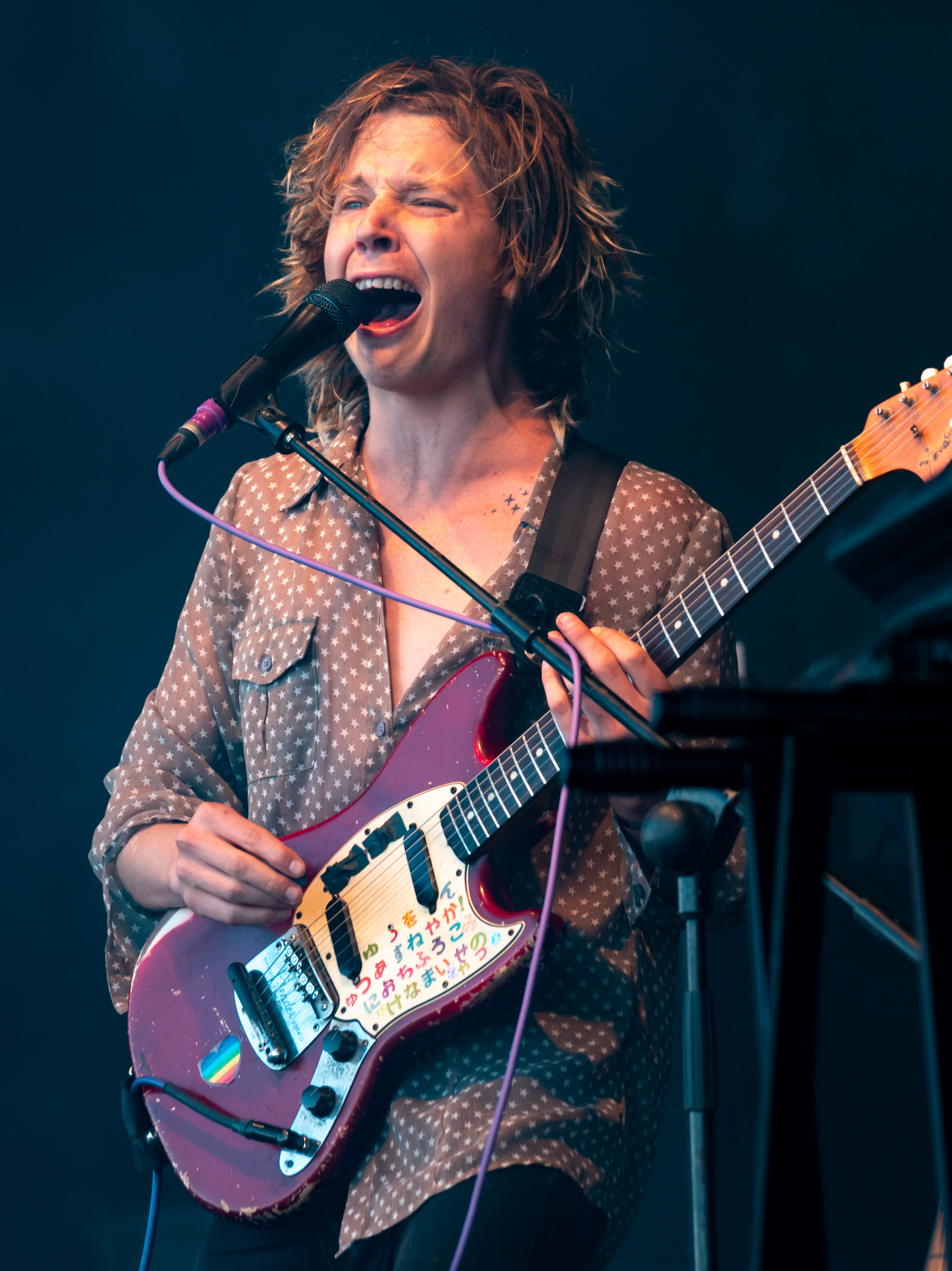
- Allbrook in 2019

Background information
- Also known as: Paisley Adams
- Born: Nicholas Allbrook; 23 November 1987 (age 38); Subiaco, Western Australia, Australia
- Origin: Fremantle, Western Australia, Australia
- Genres: Psychedelic rock, psychedelic pop, neo-psychedelia, glam rock, funk, alternative rock
- Occupations: Musician, singer, songwriter
- Instruments: Vocals, guitar, bass, keyboards, flute, drums
- Years active: 2006–present
- Label: Modular Recordings
- Member of: Pond
- Formerly of: Tame Impala (touring member)

Nicholas Allbrook (born 23 November 1987) is an Australian psychedelic rock musician, singer, and songwriter. He is best known as the frontman of Pond, and a member of musical duo Allbrook/Avery. He was a touring member of Tame Impala before leaving the group in 2013.

== Early life ==
Born in Perth, Western Australia, Allbrook grew up in Fremantle for the first four years of his life. He then moved with his parents to Derby, a town in the Kimberley region of Western Australia, where he lived until the age of 12. Allbrook has a brother and sister, both "quite a bit older." After spending eight years moving around the Kimberley, Allbrook moved back to Perth where he spent the majority of his teenage life. Whilst living in Derby he attended Derby District High School. Allbrook also attended Christ Church Grammar School in Perth, graduating in 2004.

During the main part his life in high school, music never came up as an interest for Allbrook. He was focused on skateboarding from year 8 to year 11, then became invested in soccer. Towards the end of year 12 he made friends with another student and started listening to music. At about the same time, his parents bought him a guitar, and he began to attend lessons with a local Perth teacher, though he has stated that he was "awful" at the time.

Whilst beginning to play in a school band with his friends, Allbrook was interested in and listened to a lot of The Who and Led Zeppelin. It was around this time that he started to write his own songs, but he did not begin to record his own music until a couple of years later when he had a tape recorder.

== Career ==
=== 2005–2010 Electric Blue Acid Dogs and Mink Mussel Creek ===
In 2005 Allbrook's first serious band, Electric Blue Acid Dogs, formed out of his and his friends' interest in alternative music. To begin, the lineup was Allbrook, and his two friends Steve and Nathan. They performed blues covers and recorded songs on tape recorders. Later, the band were forced to change their name to Mink Mussel Creek enter in band competitions due to the drug reference ("Acid"). At the same time, they recruited Sam Devenport to be their drummer.

It was through one of these competitions in 2007 that Allbrook first met Kevin Parker, when Mink Mussel Creek battled the Dee Dee Dums (which would later become the basis of Tame Impala). Parker drummed for the band whilst they waited for Devenport to arrive, and the band decided that Parker should permanently become the drummer, allowing Devenport to pursue his acting career.

From 2007, Mink Mussel Creek, which finally settled as Nick Allbrook on vocals, Shiny Joe Ryan on guitar, Steve Summerlin on bass, Richard Ingham on synths and Kevin Parker on drums, slowly began gaining popularity in the Perth music scene. In 2007 he bought a flute off eBay, and figured out how to play using the internet.

In 2008, after receiving an AUS$10,000 government grant, Mink Mussel Creek recorded its first album. However, due to circumstances out of the band's control, primarily concerning a problematic producer and dysfunctional recording process, the album was never released. The album was eventually leaked on the internet under the title Kingdom Tapes, and the band members went their separate ways with other musical projects.

2011 saw Mink Mussel Creek reform and re-record their much awaited album, Mink Mussel Manticore. The album was recorded live at local Fremantle venue, the Norfolk Basement, and released on USB wristband. As of 2014, the album has also been reissued online and on vinyl.

=== 2008–2013: Tame Impala ===
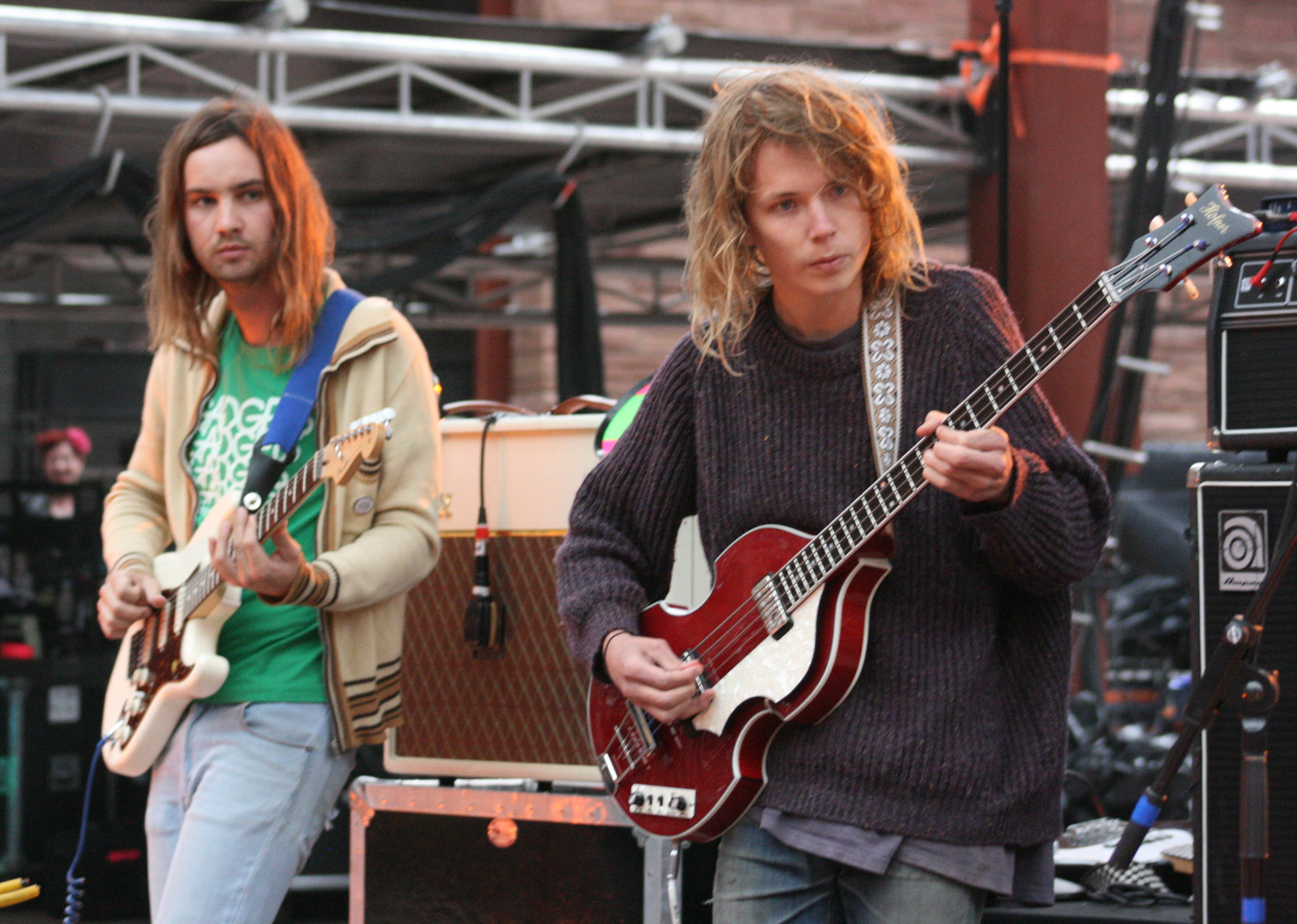
Kevin Parker and Allbrook performing with Tame Impala in June 2010

After supporting Parker as a live member of Tame Impala for five years (2008–2013), Allbrook departed the group to "screw his head back on" and focus on his other projects. His place as bassist was replaced by long time friend and fellow musician Cam Avery.

=== 2008–present: Pond ===
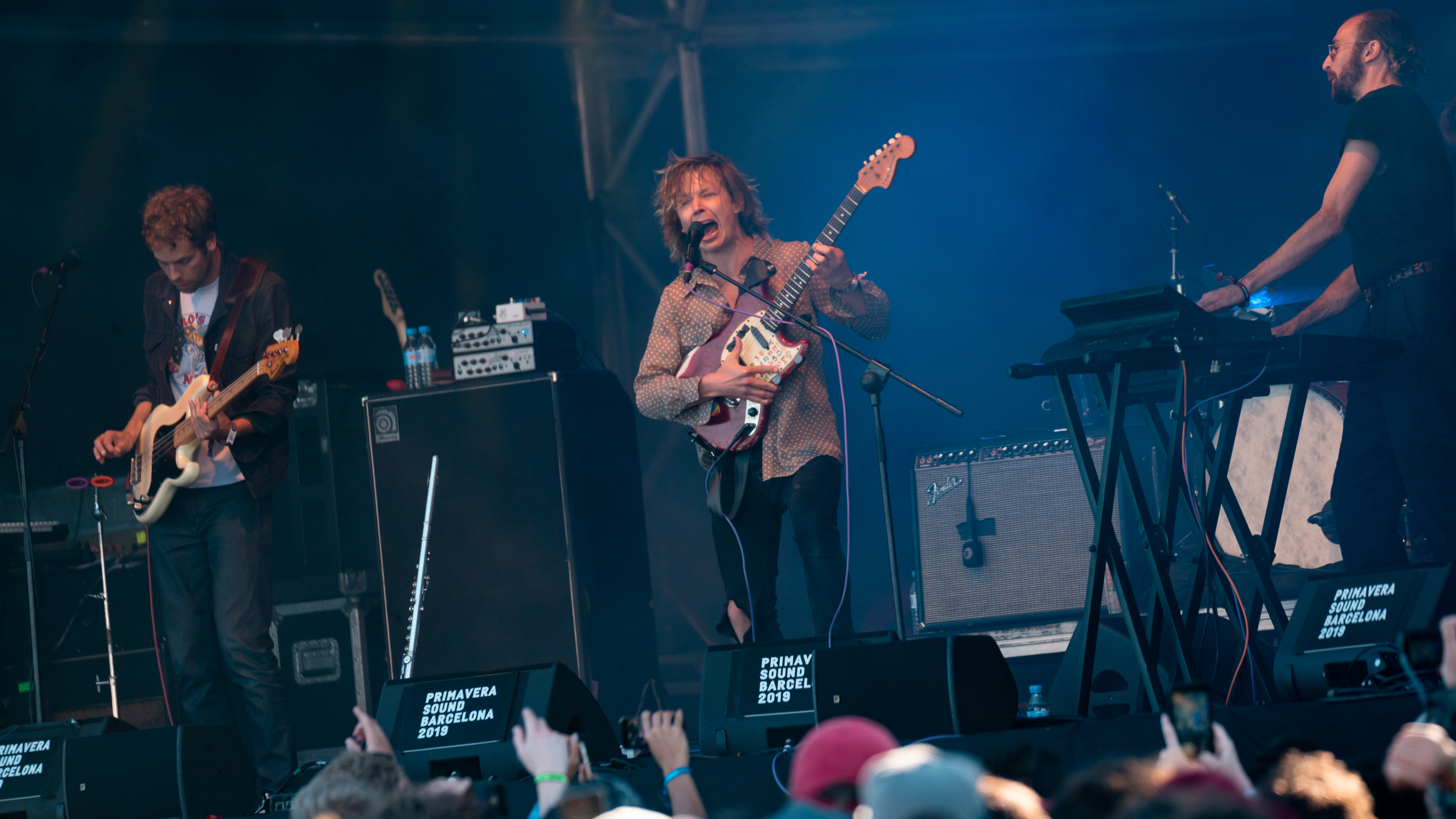
Pond performing at Primavera Sound in 2019

In 2008 Nick Allbrook, Jay Watson and Shiny Joe Ryan had the idea of an "ego-free project where they were able to get anyone they wanted to play whatever they wanted." That project was to be known as Pond. To date, Pond have released eleven studio albums: Psychedelic Mango (2009), Corridors of Blissterday (2009), Frond (2010), Beard, Wives, Denim (2012), Hobo Rocket (2013), Man It Feels Like Space Again (2015), The Weather (2017), Tasmania (2019), 9 (2021), Stung! (2024), and Terrestrials (2026).

=== 2011: Allbrook/Avery ===
Allbrook/Avery is a musical project between Nicholas Allbrook and Cam Avery, formed in 2011. It began when Allbrook, homeless at the time, moved into the back room of Avery's house. They discovered a mutual love of lo-fi music and began writing together. He has stated that, "Allbrook/Avery’s just a lot more of a relaxed… gradual process of me and Cam writing songs and sharing them with each other and recording them with whatever people we see fit."

To date, the duo has released one album released, Big 'Art (2011). Another album, recorded with four members of The Horrors in one week in 2013, has been "filed away" with "no release date as of yet". Allbrook has said that he "doesn't know where it is", while Avery has said that it is in "post-production". A third album has also been mentioned.

=== 2014–present: Solo work ===
In 2014, Allbrook released his first solo album with Spinning Top Records titled Ganough, Wallis & Fatuna. In 2016, Allbrook released a second solo album titled Pure Gardiya. In 2019, he released his third solo album titled Wabi Sabi Bruto Bruta.

In June 2023, Allbrook released his fourth studio album, Manganese. In an album review, Alex Gallagher from NME said "While Nicholas Allbrook can seem larger than life when fronting kaleidoscopic psych-pop band Pond, his fourth album trades aplomb for honesty. Slow burners like closer 'The Night Before You Flew' are starkly intimate, beautiful while feeling like they may break at any moment."

In 2026, Allbrook formed a new band, Walrus. In April, he was appointed Chair of Contemporary Music at the University of Western Australia.

== Discography ==
=== Studio albums ===
Title	Details
Ganough, Wallis And Fatuna.	Released: September 5, 2014; Label: Spinning Top Music (STLP005); Format: LP, digital download
Pure Gardiya	Released: May 27, 2016; Label: Spinning Top Music (STLP008); Format: LP, digital download
Wabi Sabi Bruto Bruta	Released: February 7, 2019; Label: Spinning Top Music; Format: LP, digital download, streaming
Manganese	Released: June 9, 2023; Label: Spinning Top Music; Format: LP, digital download, streaming

=== Live albums ===
Title	Details
surf ii	Released: November 19, 2019; Label: Spinning Top Music; Format: digital download, streaming; Recorded live on 5 September 2019 in London.

=== With Pond ===
- Psychedelic Mango (2009)
- Corridors of Blissterday (2009)
- Frond (2010) (credited as Paisley Adams)
- Beard, Wives, Denim (2012)
- Hobo Rocket (2013)
- Man It Feels Like Space Again (2015)
- The Weather (2017)
- Tasmania (2019)
- Sessions (2019) (live album)
- 9 (2021)
- Stung! (2024)
- Terrestrials (2026)
