= Pond (Australian band) =

Australian psychedelic rock band

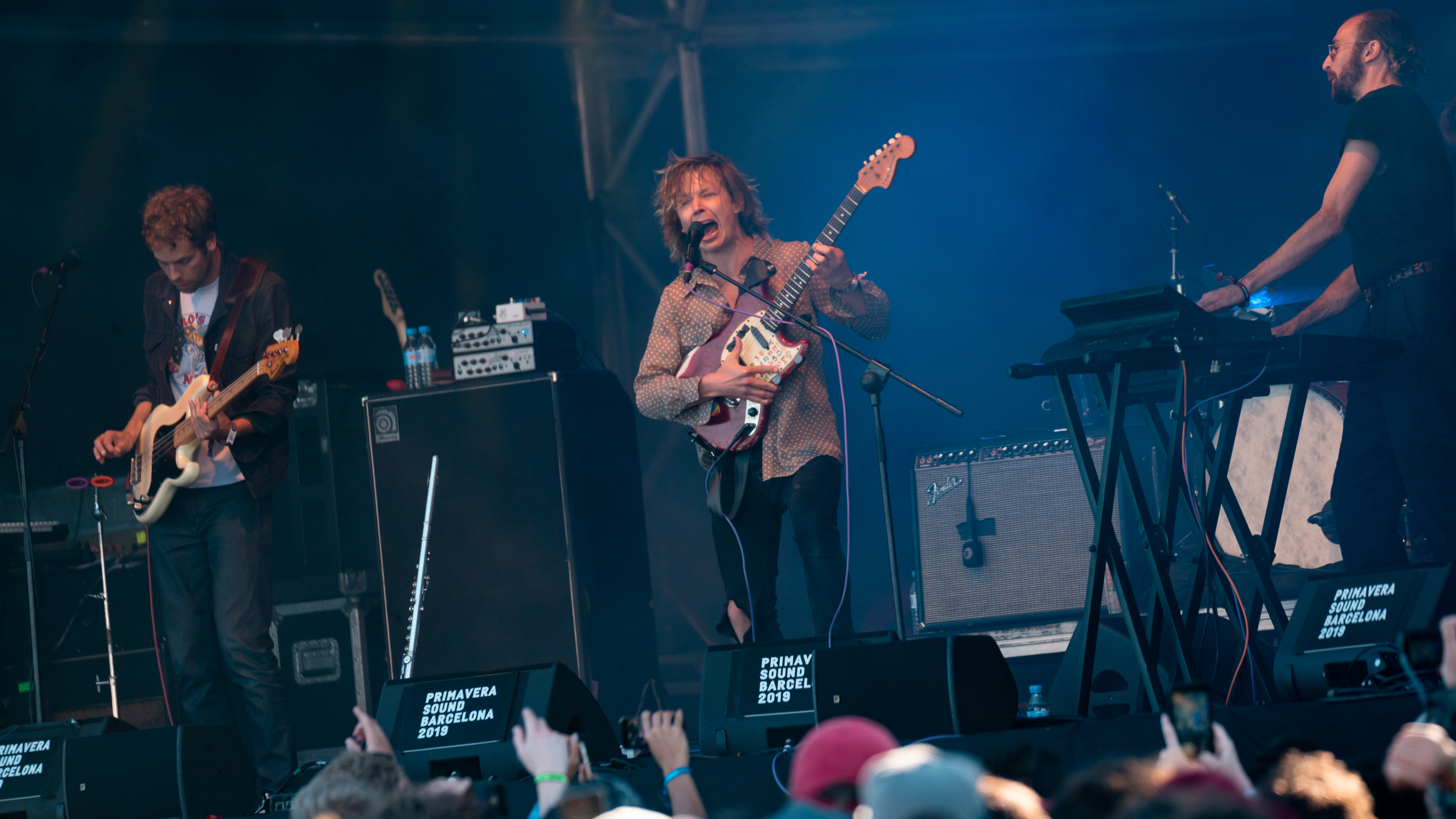
- Pond performing at Primavera Sound in 2019. Left to right: Jay Watson, Nick Allbrook, Jamie Terry

Background information
- Origin: Perth, Western Australia, Australia
- Genres: Psychedelic rock; psychedelic pop; glam rock; garage rock; space rock; synth-pop; dance-punk; electronic; indie rock; neo-psychedelia
- Works: Pond discography
- Years active: 2008–present
- Labels: Marathon; EMI; Fiction; Modular; Spinning Top; Caroline
- Spinoffs: The Growl; Allbrook/Avery; GUM; GUM & Ginoli; GUM with Ambrose Kenny-Smith
- Spinoff of: Tame Impala; The Silents; Mink Mussel Creek; Space Lime Peacock
- Members: Nick Allbrook; Jay Watson; Shiny Joe Ryan; Jamie Terry; James Ireland
- Past members: Nick Odell; Jeremy Cope; Cam Avery; Richard Ingham; Felicity Groom; Matthew Saville; Kevin Parker; Julien Barbagallo; Ben McDonald
- Website: pond.band

Pond is an Australian psychedelic rock band from Perth, Western Australia, formed in 2008. Initially featuring a revolving line-up, since 2016 the band has consisted of Nick Allbrook, Jay Watson, Shiny Joe Ryan, Jamie Terry, and James "Gin" Ireland.

Pond is often heavily associated with fellow Perth-based psychedelic rock/pop band Tame Impala, as members of both groups are longtime close friends and collaborators, as well as the band Mink Mussel Creek, which consisted of current and former members from both groups. Watson and Ireland are currently touring members of Tame Impala, and release solo material under the names GUM and Ginoli, respectively. Lead singer Allbrook contributed to both bands from 2009 to 2013 before leaving Tame Impala to focus on Pond and his own solo career. Multi-instrumentalist Ryan serves as a crew member for Tame Impala's live act, and much like Allbrook, Watson, and Ireland, also has his own solo career. In addition, current Tame Impala members Kevin Parker, Cam Avery, and Julien Barbagallo are all former members of Pond. Parker continued to work with the band as its record producer (with the band also contributing to production) until 2020, at which point the group began to produce entirely on its own, and Avery collaborated with Allbrook as the duo Allbrook/Avery in 2011. Watson and Ireland sometimes collaborate under the name GUM & Ginoli, remixing songs originally recorded by other artists.

As of November 2026, Pond has released eleven studio albums, one live album, one compilation album, and two EPs.

== History ==
Pond was formed in Perth, Western Australia, in 2008 with members Nick Allbrook, Jay Watson and Joe Ryan. The original idea of Pond was to be able to get anyone they wanted to play whatever they wanted in a collaborative musical project.

Their first album was released soon after in January 2009, titled Psychedelic Mango which contained many psychedelic rock and pop elements. Their second album, Corridors of Blissterday, was completed live with an eight-piece band in five days, and released in June 2009. This led to the creation of their 2010 album, Frond, released in May 2010, featuring a heavier pop influence than previously heard from them.

After the breakthrough success of Innerspeaker, the debut album by Tame Impala, a band which shared three members with Pond, the album Beard, Wives, Denim was recorded in 2010 and later released to critical acclaim in March 2012.

Pond toured the United States in 2012, appearing at festivals such as South by Southwest, with another album titled Hobo Rocket set for release in the future. On 26 May 2012, NME magazine named Pond "The Hottest New Band In The World" in their "Hot List" issue. On 28 June 2012, Pond had a one-off performance with Can frontman Damo Suzuki, one of Pond's biggest inspirations and musical idols.

Originally, Man It Feels Like Space Again was planned to be the next Pond album, but instead Hobo Rocket was chosen to be recorded beforehand and was released on 6 August 2013. Pond described Hobo Rocket as being "much better" than Beard, Wives, Denim. Man It Feels Like Space Again, their sixth studio album, was later released on 23 January 2015.

Pond announced their seventh album The Weather, released on 5 May 2017 via Marathon Artists. The announcement came with the release of two singles, "30000 Megatons" and "Sweep Me Off My Feet". The title and chorus of the first song refer to the 30,000 nuclear warheads in the arsenal of the Earth. As with their previous album, The Weather was co-produced by the band and Kevin Parker at his home studio in Perth. The album was preceded by the release of two more singles, "The Weather" and "Paint Me Silver". The album was released to critical acclaim, with many publications praising it as an evolution and maturation of the band's sound and songwriting.

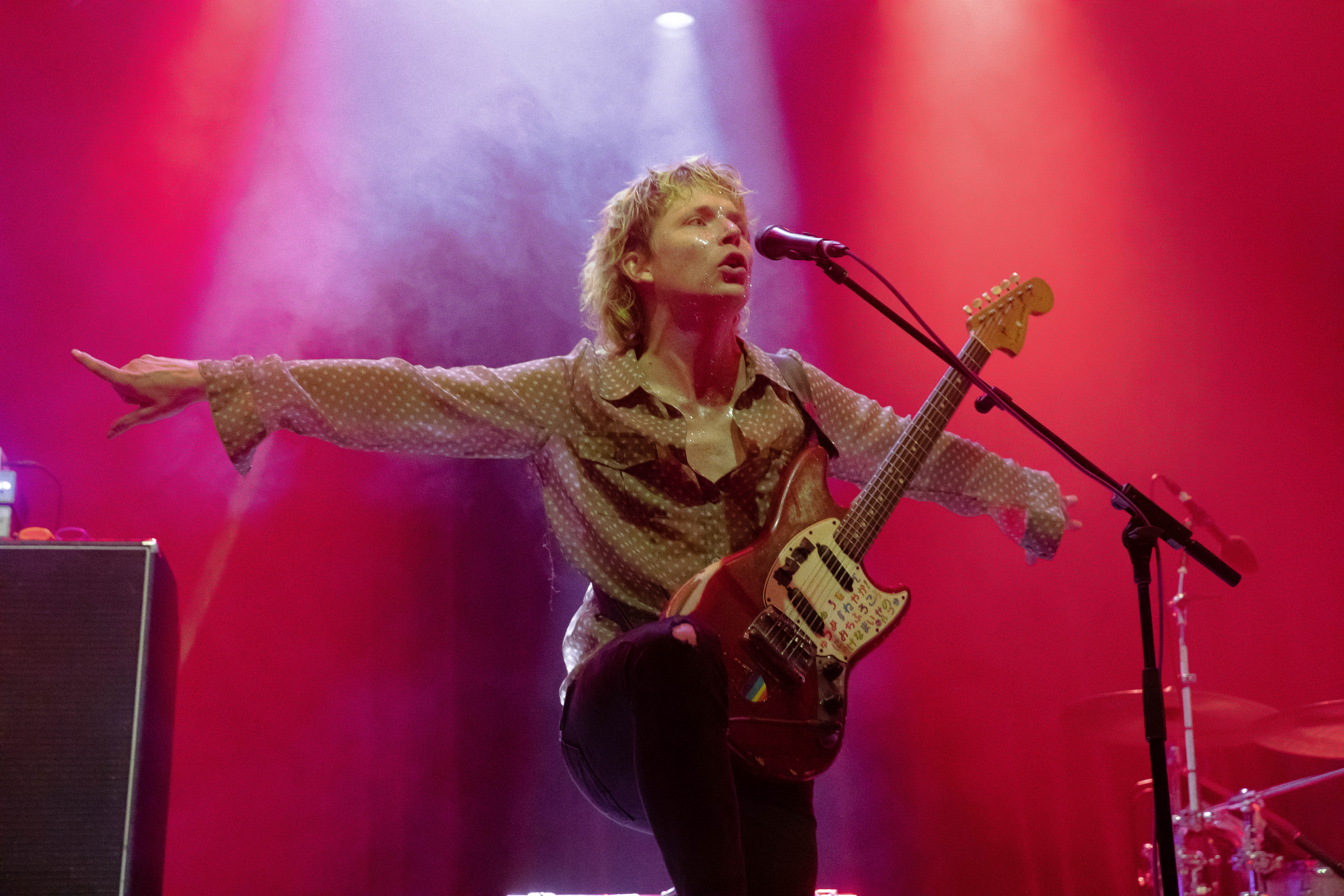
Allbrook performing with Pond in November 2018

A little over a year after the release of The Weather, on 23 July 2018, Pond released the single "Burnt Out Star" and announced tour dates. The band then released the single "Sixteen Days" on 5 October along with an accompanying music video. The single "Daisy" was released on 10 January 2019 with a music video that was filmed on land for which the Kulin and Nyoongar Nations were the traditional custodians, with the band paying respect to them in the opening card. Along with the release of this single, the band announced through social media their eighth studio album, Tasmania, which was released through Interscope Records on 1 March 2019 to similar acclaim as The Weather.

Days after the release of Tasmania, the band toured locally, with performances in Perth, Brisbane, Sydney, and Melbourne. It would be their first local tour since 2017. Later that year they would go on to tour Europe and the UK.

On 9 September 2019, the band announced a live album, Sessions, which was released on 8 November 2019. To promote it they released the single "Don't Look at the Sun (Or You'll Go Blind)", an updated live version of a song featured on their debut album Psychedelic Mango.

During a live performance in Perth, Australia on 8 November 2020, the band unveiled a song titled "America's Cup" and hinted that their ninth studio album was set to be released in June 2021. On 31 March 2021, the band released a single called "Pink Lunettes", which was accompanied by a music video directed by band member Jamie Terry. On 17 May 2021, the band revealed that their ninth studio album, 9, would be released on 1 October 2021, along with its lead single, "America's Cup". On 30 June 2021, the album's third single, "Toast", was released alongside a video that was co-directed by the band. On 1 September 2021, the album's fourth single, "Human Touch", was released and accompanied by a video co-directed by Duncan Wright and lead singer Nick Allbrook. On 17 November 2021, the band released a video for the album track, "Take Me Avalon I'm Young", filmed in Hastings, UK, and directed by Bunny Kinney. On 2 March 2022, the band revealed that a deluxe edition of 9 was in the works, titled 9 DLX Edition, and was to include four additional tracks cut from the album's initial release. Alongside the announcement they unveiled a video for its lead single, “Lights of Leeming”, directed by the band. On 4 May 2022, they released a video for its second single, “Hang a Cross On Me”, featuring vocals by Cowboy John, who had previously appeared on the title track of Hobo Rocket; the video was directed by Alex Haygarth and Nick Allbrook. 9 DLX Edition was released on 20 May 2022.

On 31 January 2024, Pond released a new single, "Neon River", accompanied by a music video. In February and March, they toured across Australia and New Zealand as one of the opening acts for Queens of the Stone Age. On 27 March 2024, the band announced that their tenth studio album, Stung!, would be released on 21 June 2024. Accompanying the album's unveiling was its second single, "(I'm) Stung", along with a music video and news of a tour of Australia later that year. On 21 May 2024, it was announced that the third single from Stung!, titled "So Lo", would be released on 28 May 2024.

On 7 February 2025, Pond announced a new compilation album titled The Early Years: 2008–2010, which would be released on 12 April 2025 as a Record Store Day exclusive and would consist of 11 of the 24 songs that make up their first three albums: Psychedelic Mango (2009), Corridors of Blissterday (2009), and Frond (2010), none of which are available on streaming services or for official purchase. On 4 June 2025, The Early Years: 2008–2010 was made available on all streaming services. As of 31 July 2025, Pond were in the process of recording their eleventh studio album.

On 17 March 2026, Pond released a new single titled "Terrestrials" -- which they had first performed live at a show in early 2025 -- alongside the announcement of a small US tour opening for actor Joe Keery's musical project, Djo. On 2 April 2026, the band announced that a single titled "Two Hands" -- which was first performed live on 21 December 2025 in Jakarta -- would be released on 8 April 2026. On 8 April 2026, alongside the release of "Two Hands", Pond announced that their eleventh studio album, Terrestrials, would be released on 19 June 2026 through their own imprint, Mangovision via Secretly Distribution. Alongside the announcement of Terrestrials was the reveal of additional US tour dates in which the band will be headlining. On 12 May 2026, the band released "Through the Heather", the third and final pre-release single from Terrestrials.

== Band name ==
According to Allbrook during the band's concert at Paradiso Amsterdam on 7 October 2024, the name of the band originates from a duck swimming in the canals of Amsterdam. The duck created a whirl when it started diving. Therefore, 'pond' refers to a whirl, rather than a lake. Ryan has a diving duck tattooed on his chest.

== Band members ==
=== Current ===
- Nick Allbrook – lead vocals, flute, keyboards, synthesizer, guitar, bass (2008–present)
- Jay "GUM" Watson – drums, backing vocals, bass, guitar, keyboards, synthesizer (2008–present)
- "Shiny" Joe Ryan – guitar, backing vocals, bass (2008–present)
- Jamie Terry – keyboards, synthesizer bass (2010–present)
- James "Gin" Ireland – drums, keyboards (2016–present)

=== Current touring musicians ===
- Chris Wright – drums (2025–present; substitute for James Ireland)

=== Former members ===
- Kevin Parker – drums (2009–2011)
- Matthew Saville – drums (2009)
- Julien Barbagallo – bass (2014–2015)
- Cam Avery – drums, bass (2012–2014)
- Ben McDonald – bass (2014)

== Discography ==
Studio albums

- Psychedelic Mango (2009)
- Corridors of Blissterday (2009)
- Frond (2010)
- Beard, Wives, Denim (2012)
- Hobo Rocket (2013)
- Man It Feels Like Space Again (2015)
- The Weather (2017)
- Tasmania (2019)
- 9 (2021)
- Stung! (2024)
- Terrestrials (2026)

== Awards and nominations ==
=== AIR Awards ===
The Australian Independent Record Awards (commonly known informally as AIR Awards) is an annual awards night to recognise, promote and celebrate the success of Australia's Independent Music sector.

Year	Nominee / work	Award	Result
2020	Tasmania	Best Independent Rock Album or EP	Nominated
2025	"I'm Stung"	Independent Music Video of the Year	Nominated

=== APRA Awards ===
The APRA Awards are held in Australia and New Zealand by the Australasian Performing Right Association to recognise songwriting skills, sales and airplay performance by its members annually.

Year	Nominee / work	Award	Result	Ref.
2016	"Zond"	Song of the Year	Shortlisted	

=== EG Awards / Music Victoria Awards ===
The EG Awards (known as Music Victoria Awards since 2013) are an annual awards night celebrating Victorian music. They commenced in 2006.

Year	Nominee / work	Award	Result
2012	Beard, Wives, Denim	Best Album	Nominated
2012	Pond	Best Band	Nominated

=== Rolling Stone Australia Awards ===
The Rolling Stone Australia Awards are awarded annually in January or February by the Australian edition of Rolling Stone magazine for outstanding contributions to popular culture in the previous year.

Year	Nominee / work	Award	Result	Ref.
2025	Pond	Rolling Stone Readers Award	Shortlisted	

=== West Australian Music Industry Awards ===
The West Australian Music Industry Awards (WAMIs) are annual awards presented to the local contemporary music industry, put on annually by the Western Australian Music Industry Association Inc (WAM). Pond has won two awards.

Year	Nominee / work	Award	Result (wins only)
2014	Pond	Most Popular Act	Won
2014	Pond	Most Popular Live Act	Won
