= The End of the World (video) =

- Starring: Jason Windsor
- Release date: October 30, 2003
- Running time: 1 minute, 31 seconds

The End of the World (also known as End of Ze World) is a Flash animated viral video created by Jason Windsor of Albino Blacksheep in 2003. A copy of the animation uploaded by Albino Blacksheep to YouTube in 2008 had approximately 14 million views before being abandoned in favor of a higher-resolution version.

== Background ==
In an interview with the Daily Dot in 2017, Windsor said "I don't know that I really thought that the world was going to end ... I guess that was kind of the first time I sort of had to comprehend that [the possession of nuclear weapons by foreign countries]."

== Synopsis ==
The video depicts various countries reacting to nuclear threats, including the United States, France, United Kingdom, Russia, China, India, Pakistan, Israel, and Australia. Ultimately, the entire world is nuked and subsequently destroyed by a nuclear winter. The video also features a caricature of then-US President George W. Bush.

== Sequel ==
On January 20, 2018, Windsor released a sequel entitled "End of ze World ...Probably for Real This Time". The video comments on the problems occurring during the presidency of Donald Trump.
