= The Edge of the World (book) =

2014 book by Michael Pye

- First edition
- Author: Michael Pye
- Language: English
- Genre: Non-fiction
- Publisher: Pegasus Books
- Publication date: 2014
- ISBN: 978-1-605-98699-9

The Edge of the World: A Cultural History of the North Sea and the Transformation of Europe is a 2014 history book written by Michael Pye and published by Pegasus Books. The book tells a history based on neglected archival sources and fresh interpretations of other sources. It covers the period from the fall of the Roman Empire to just before Europe's emergence from the medieval era. The story focuses on the impact of the medieval North Sea cultures.

Reviewers praised Pye's engaging storytelling and his core argument, but critiqued some of his wider connections.
