= Terrestrials (Pond album) =

2026 studio album by Pond

Studio album by Pond
- Released: 19 June 2026
- Studios: Tunafish; Nowave; Dreamdust 2
- Genres: Post-punk; new wave; gothic rock; psychedelic rock
- Length: 37:43
- Label: Mangovision
- Producer: Pond

Pond chronology
The Early Years: 2008–2010 (2025)	Terrestrials (2026)

Singles from Terrestrials
- 1. "Terrestrials" Released: 17 March 2026; 2. "Two Hands" Released: 8 April 2026; 3. "Through the Heather" Released: 12 May 2026

Terrestrials is the eleventh studio album by Australian psychedelic rock band Pond. It was released on 19 June 2026 on the band's own Mangovision label, via Secretly Distribution. The album was preceded by the singles "Terrestrials", "Two Hands", and "Through the Heather".

== Writing and production ==
When recording of the album began, the band decided to try something different and set three rules for themselves: "no fuzz, no ballads, and no Pink Floyd shit". As a result, they wound up being inspired by 1980s post-punk, new wave, and gothic rock in order to achieve an '80s Australian "goths at the pub" sound, with heavy influence taken from bands such as The Church, Magazine, Midnight Oil, and The Sisters of Mercy.

According to frontman Nick Allbrook, Jay Watson wrote the music for lead single "Terrestrials", and that the song was recorded in Mullumbimby with Julian Abbott at Nowave studio. "The song is about the weirdest of all the terrestrials, people. Hellbent on flying away from or killing our home soil, with a big appetite for destruction, guns, roses."

Allbrook has said that the album's second single, "Two Hands", is about when mining company Rio Tinto blew up Juukun Gorge in the Hammersley Range in Western Australia. The mining company destroyed sacred rock shelters that contained a cultural sequence spanning 46,000 years that had been taken care of by the local Indigenous communities.

The third single, "Through the Heather", was conceived during the band's European tour in 2024, when drummer James Ireland was experimenting on Ableton. Allbrook stated that "sometimes rock and roll is a glamorous game baby, but mainly it isn't. Funny that such a beautiful, melancholic, searching song was born surrounded by chip packets and track pants in a van full of filthy pigs."

Regarding the opening track "Skyworks", Allbrook said that "the skyworks happen every year on the day Australia was invaded and claimed by the crown. They explode over the river in a gaudy display of drunkenness and patriotism, sponsored by the Lotto. We love a flutter. The river is bejeweled with magical glittering lights, and loud bangs that remind some of cannons and muskets. The river is ablaze, magic, filthy—like a Hieronymus Bosch picture, strewn with bottles and shit in the morning. It's a confusing time for a confused people. Joe Ryan wrote the main chord progression for this one and then it grew in weird ways."

== Promotion and release ==
The album was formally announced on 8 April 2026, alongside the release of the album's second single, "Two Hands". Terrestrials was released worldwide on 19 June 2026.

On 17 March 2026, the single "Terrestrials" was released, making it the lead single of the album. The release of the single was accompanied by a music video directed and produced by Jesse Taylor Smith. The artwork for the album and the single "Terrestrials" was painted by Jessie Lee Nash.

On 8 April 2026, the second single "Two Hands" was released. In the song's music video shows two men living in an apocalyptic junkyard evading the police. Tom Breihan of Stereogum describes the music video having "cartoonish Mad Max vibes" and "charming". The music video was directed by Sam Kristofski and Pond.

The album's third single, "Through the Heather", was released on 12 May 2026. A new music video directed by Albert Pritchard accompanied the release of the single.

On 18 June 2026, a music video for the album's opening track "Skyworks" was released, directed by Stephanie Senior.

== Track listing ==
All tracks are written by Nicholas Allbrook, James Ireland, Joseph Ryan, Jamie Terry, and Jay Watson; "The Fatal Shore" written with Kevin Parker.

Terrestrials track listing
No.	Title	Length
1.	"Skyworks"	4:20
2.	"Casuarina"	3:41
3.	"Through the Heather"	3:21
4.	"Two Hands"	4:24
5.	"Roebuck Plains"	3:32
6.	"The Fatal Shore"	4:01
7.	"Tourmaline"	2:17
8.	"Terrestrials"	3:59
9.	"Personal Hell"	4:12
10.	"Nashville (I'm Dying)"	3:56
Total length:		37:43

== Personnel ==
Credits are adapted from the album's liner notes and Tidal.

=== Pond ===
- Nicholas Allbrook – vocals, production (all tracks); guitar (tracks 3–5, 9, 10), recording (4–7, 10), synthesizer (5)
- James Ireland – production, mixing (all tracks); keyboards (1–5, 10), bass (1), drums (3–5, 10), recording (4–7, 10), synthesizer (6, 7, 9)
- Shiny Joe Ryan – production (all tracks), guitar (1–6, 8, 9), recording (4–7, 10)
- Jamie Terry – production (all tracks), synthesizer (1, 2, 6, 8), bass (3, 4, 8, 9), recording (4–7, 10)
- Jay Watson – guitar, production, mixing (all tracks); background vocals (1, 2, 4–7), synthesizer (2, 6, 9, 10), recording (4–7, 10), bass (5, 7, 10), drums (6, 7), drum machine (9)

=== Additional contributors ===
- Heba Kadry – mastering
- Chris Wright – drums (1, 2, 9)
- Brod Madden-Scott – recording (1, 3)
- Julian Abbott – recording (2, 8, 9)
- Kevin Parker – production, recording, programming (6)
- Jessie Nash – cover paintings
- Olivia Senior – photography
- Joseph Dennis – artwork, type, design

== Charts ==
Chart performance for Terrestrials
Chart (2026)	Peak position
Australian Albums (ARIA)	19
French Rock & Metal Albums (SNEP)	99
