= Shiny Joe Ryan =

Australian musician (born 1987)

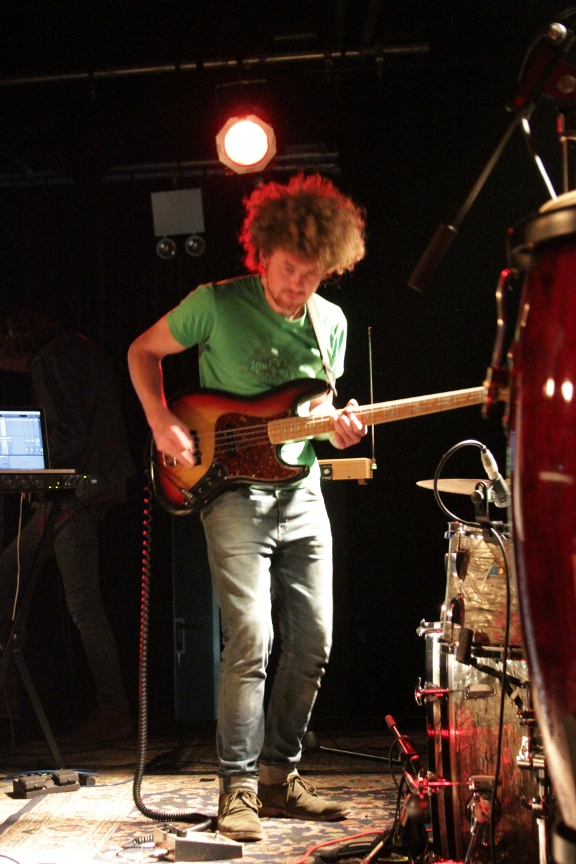
- Ryan in 2012

Background information
- Also known as: Joseph Orion McJam
- Born: Joseph Michael Ryan; 23 August 1987 (age 38); Nenagh, Ireland
- Origin: Perth, Western Australia, Australia
- Genres: Psychedelic rock; psychedelic pop; neo-psychedelia; space rock; glam rock
- Occupations: Musician; singer; songwriter
- Instruments: Vocals; guitar; piano; keyboards; synthesisers; bass; drums; percussion
- Years active: 2007–present
- Labels: Modular; Spinning Top
- Member of: Pond

Joseph Michael "Shiny Joe" Ryan (born 23 August 1987) is an Irish-Australian psychedelic rock musician, singer and songwriter. He is the founding mainstay multi-instrumentalist and guitarist of Pond, which have released nine albums. Ryan has issued two solo albums, The Cosmic Microwave Background (30 May 2014) and Shiny's Democracy (23 July 2021). He also does the visuals for fellow Australian band Tame Impala.

== Biography ==
Joseph Michael Ryan was born on 23 August 1987 in Nenagh, Ireland. At the age of six-and-a-half his family emigrated to Perth.

=== Mink Mussel Creek ===
In 2007, Shiny Joe Ryan joined the recently formed Mink Mussel Creek on guitar, with Nick Allbrook on vocals, Richard Ingham on synthesisers, Kevin Parker on drums and Steve Summerlin on bass guitar. Mink Mussel Creek recorded an unreleased album in 2008.

=== Pond ===
In 2008 Ryan, Allbrook and Jay Watson had the idea of an "ego-free project where they were able to get anyone they wanted to play whatever they wanted." To date, Pond have released eleven albums: Psychedelic Mango (2009), Corridors of Blissterday (2009), Frond (2010), Beard, Wives, Denim (2012), Hobo Rocket (2013), Man It Feels Like Space Again (January 2015), The Weather (May 2017), Tasmania (March 2019), 9 (October 2021), Stung! (June 2024), and Terrestrials (June 2026).

== The Cosmic Microwave Background ==
On 30 May 2014 Shiny Joe Ryan digitally released his debut solo album, The Cosmic Microwave Background, in Australia. The album was digitally released worldwide on 14 October 2014. Cosmic microwave background in the title refers to the radiation and energy left behind by the Big Bang. It was self-written over two years and partly-recorded in Ryan's apartment in Berlin. The tracks "Holding Out for You" and "Medicine Hat", which were to appear on his album, were released on Pond's Man It Feels Like Space Again. He supported his album with a brief tour of Australia and then returned to his duties with Pond.

TheMusic.com.au's Hannah Story felt The Cosmic Microwave Background was "traditional psych fare in this laidback debut... that roams between genres and sonic textures. Unfortunately Ryan's vocals are weak throughout but this is made up for amply by wailing guitar lines and experiments in instrumentation." His label touted it as a "heart-rending journey of interstellar innocence." While Clare Armstrong of 4ZZZ opined that its "psychedelic pop... [has] just not quite enough that's new or exciting to differentiate it from its contemporaries." Later in 2014 he toured as part of the support crew for Tame Impala, doing their visuals.

== Discography ==
=== With Pond ===
- Psychedelic Mango (2009)
- Corridors of Blissterday (2009)
- Frond (2010) (credited as Joseph Orion McJam)
- Beard, Wives, Denim (2012)
- Hobo Rocket (2013)
- Man It Feels Like Space Again (2015)
- The Weather (2017)
- Tasmania (2019)
- Sessions (2019)
- 9 (2021)
- Stung! (2024)
- Terrestrials (2026)
