= Tasmania (album) =

Studio album by Pond
- Released: 1 March 2019
- Studios: Kevin Parker's home studio (Fremantle, Western Australia)
- Genres: Psychedelic rock; psychedelic pop; neo-psychedelia
- Length: 48:05
- Label: Spinning Top
- Producers: Kevin Parker; Pond

Pond chronology
The Weather (2017)	Tasmania (2019)	9 (2021)

Singles from Tasmania
- 1. "Burnt Out Star" Released: 23 July 2018; 2. "Sixteen Days" Released: 5 October 2018; 3. "Daisy" Released: 10 January 2019

Tasmania is the eighth studio album by Australian psychedelic rock band Pond. It was released on 1 March 2019 by Spinning Top Records via Caroline Australia (Interscope Records internationally). As with previous Pond albums, it is also co-produced by former member and Tame Impala frontman Kevin Parker, and serves as the final album he would co-produce alongside the band, as they decided to produce on their own with subsequent albums. It features 10 tracks, led by third single "Daisy".

At the AIR Awards of 2020, the album was nominated for Best Independent Rock Album or EP.

== Background ==
Tasmania has been called a "sister album" to the band's previous record, 2017's The Weather. It was recorded in Fremantle, Western Australia.

=== Concept ===
Tasmania, much like the band's previous release, The Weather, is a concept album that continues exploring certain themes and topics touched on in that record. In a statement, the band called the album a "dejected meditation on planetary discord, water, machismo, shame, blame and responsibility, love, blood and empire". In addition, the band also stated that the album "coats an undercurrent of restless, anxious dread in a sheen of light, apathetic content - both real and parody - rather than wallowing in self-pity, encouraging us to celebrate the fruits of our planet, frolic in the ocean, kick up the dust, roll in the grass and enjoy the feeling of being in love - while we still can."

== Singles ==
"Burnt Out Star" and "Sixteen Days" were released in 2018 as the first two singles from the album prior to its announcement, released on 23 July and 5 October respectively. The third and lead single, "Daisy", released on 10 January 2019 to accompany the album's announcement, was noted for featuring "seductive changeups and dance-worthy delivery" by Paste magazine. A promo video for the title track, "Tasmania", was released to YouTube on 1 March 2019 to coincide with the album's release. Music videos for "The Boys Are Killing Me" and "Hand Mouth Dancer" were also uploaded to YouTube later in the year.

== Critical reception ==
Professional ratings
Aggregate scores
Source	Rating
Metacritic	77/100
Review scores
Source	Rating
AllMusic	3.5/5 stars
Consequence of Sound	B
DIY Mag	3/5 stars
musicOMH	3/5 stars
NME	4/5 stars
Pitchfork	7.5/10

Tasmania received generally positive reviews from critics. At Metacritic, which assigns a normalized rating out of 100 to reviews from mainstream publications, the album received an average score of 77, based on fourteen reviews. Mark Deming gave a positive review for AllMusic, claiming " the music is effective and satisfying regardless of the level of quirkiness (they have a consistently strong talent for cutting a potent groove), and they make their eccentricities work in their favor rather than just boosting their "interesting" quotient."

== Track listing ==
No.	Title	Writer(s)	Lead vocals	Length
1.	"Daisy"	Nick Allbrook	Allbrook	6:20
2.	"Sixteen Days"	Allbrook	Allbrook	2:53
3.	"Tasmania"	Jay Watson; James Ireland; Allbrook	Allbrook	4:04
4.	"The Boys Are Killing Me"	Allbrook; Watson; Annie Milgun	Allbrook	3:46
5.	"Hand Mouth Dancer"	Allbrook; Watson	Allbrook	4:40
6.	"Goodnight, P.C.C."	Joe Ryan; Allbrook; Watson	Allbrook; Ryan	5:24
7.	"Burnt Out Star"	Watson; Allbrook	Allbrook; Watson	8:09
8.	"Selené"	Ireland; Watson; Allbrook	Allbrook	3:54
9.	"Shame"	Allbrook	Allbrook	4:51
10.	"Doctor's In"	Ryan	Ryan	4:04
Total length:				48:05

== Personnel ==
Pond

- Nick Allbrook
- Jay Watson
- Joe Ryan
- Jamie Terry
- James Ireland

Additional musicians

- Francesca Mountfort – cello on "Daisy"
- Joey Waronker – drums on "Tasmania" starting at 3:04
- Lucy Jack – additional vocals on "Burnt Out Star"
- Tristan Parr – cello on "Selené"
- Jonathan Wilson – guitar on "Selené"
- Benjamin Witt – guitar solo on "Shame"
- Kevin Parker – drums on "Doctor's In"

Production

- Production – Kevin Parker & Pond
- Mixing – Kevin Parker & Pond
- Engineering – Kevin Parker & Pond
- Mastering – Joe Carra
- Additional engineering on "Selené" – Sam Ford
- Artwork – Pond

== Charts ==
Chart (2019)	Peak position
Australian Albums (ARIA)	15
Australian Physical Albums (ARIA)	5
