= Clubber Lang Band =

Norwegian band

The Clubber Lang Band is an indie-rock band based in Bergen, Norway. The band consists of four members, Anders Johannessen - Vocals, Øystein Hagen - Guitar, Anders Dahle - Bass and Halvor Dahle - Drums, all graduates of the Norwegian School of Economics and Business Administration (NHH). Clubber Lang was formed in the winter of 2005, and recorded The Contender EP the following spring. The single "End of the World" reached No. 10 on VG singles chart in 2006. They are currently working on their new EP.

== Current members ==
- Anders Johannessen - vocals,
- Øystein Hagen - Guitar,
- Anders Dahle - Bass,
- Halvor Dahle - drums,
