= Stung! =

Studio album by Pond
- Released: 21 June 2024
- Studio: Jay Watson's backyard studio (Fremantle); Tone City (Perth)
- Genre: Psychedelic rock; psychedelic pop; neo-psychedelia
- Length: 54:32
- Label: Spinning Top
- Producer: Pond

Pond chronology
9 (2021)	Stung! (2024)	The Early Years: 2008–2010 (2025)

Singles from Stung!
- 1. "Neon River" Released: 31 January 2024; 2. "(I'm) Stung" Released: 27 March 2024; 3. "So Lo" Released: 28 May 2024

Stung! is the tenth studio album by Australian psychedelic rock band Pond. It was released on 21 June 2024 via Spinning Top. It is the band's first double album, and as their tenth release, serves as a de facto celebration of everything the band had previously accomplished with their prior albums. Upon its release, Stung! received generally positive reviews from music critics.

It peaked at 49 on the ARIA Charts.

== Background ==
According to frontman Nick Allbrook, he wrote most of the record's lead single, "(I'm) Stung", while "mowing someone's lawn", furthermore elaborating that:

I went home and put my fingers on the piano and pretty much played the base of it first go. This is a very rare and special treat and buoyed me for weeks. It's funny because I had a mad crush on someone, and they dropped me like a sack of shit and this song just flew down and clocked me right in the forehead and I felt totally better. Then Gin and Gum added all their magic – cool sounds, passing chords.. It's about being totally pathetically stung by someone and just having to be cool with it being unrequited. Being resilient, accepting that you are a bit of a goose, but life goes on.

The record was initially recorded in multi-instrumentalist Jay Watson's backyard studio, but was eventually taken to a studio in Dunsborough, Western Australia where they "swam during the day and recorded at night". Specific influences for the record include Fleetwood Mac's Tusk and Prince's Sign o' the Times.

== Reception ==
Professional ratings
Aggregate scores
Source	Rating
Metacritic	80/100
Review scores
Source	Rating
AllMusic	3.5/5 stars
Clash	8/10
DIY	4/5 stars
Mojo	4/5 stars
Exclaim!	6/10
Rolling Stone Australia	4/5 stars

According to the review aggregator Metacritic, Stung! received "generally favorable reviews" based on a weighted average score of 80 out of 100 from 8 critic scores.

Reviewing the album for Allmusic, Fred Thomas called it, "another hard-to-categorize but easy-to-enjoy chapter in Pond's ever-changing story. It's full of melodies made for both sunny summer days and solitary, reflective walks, and often changes gears with little notice." James Jennings of Rolling Stone Australia praised Stung!, giving it a 4/5. They described the album as an "obscure psychedelic pop gem from another era". Specific highlights Jennings noted included the lead single "(I'm) Stung", which was described as a "glam-funk stomper", "Neon River", which was described as a "seventies rock freak out", and the "epic centerpiece", "Edge of the World Pt. 3".

Another favorable review by Brad Sked of DIY stated that the album showcased a "blending evolution within their artistry, while still keeping in touch with their otherworldly roots". Some tracks they note include the opener "Constant Picnic", which Sked noted as meandering "towards the ethereal with a surreal, synth-disco-pop ballad that's an ideal summer soundtrack". "Edge of the World Pt. 3" was also a major highlight which they believed at times veered towards acid jazz and is intertwined with space rock. They also noted that it sounded akin to the works of former drummer and producer Kevin Parker and filmmaker Denis Villeneuve.

A less favourable review by Matthew Teklemarian of Exclaim! gave the record a 6/10. They described the record as being more "ebb and flow, muted in disposition and hyperactivity". Some of the highlights include "Constant Picnic", "Neon River", and "So Lo". Overall, they believe that while the first two-thirds are well paced, the record falls apart in the last third, describing it as "where indistinct sanguine ballads are sent to die. A hitherto expertly controlled buzz is bogged down by demos fleshed out in perfunctory fashion".

== Track listing ==
Stung! track listing
No.	Title	Writer(s)	Lead vocals	Length
1.	"Constant Picnic"	James Ireland; Nicholas Allbrook; Jay Watson	Allbrook	3:29
2.	"(I'm) Stung"	Allbrook; Ireland; Watson	Allbrook	3:55
3.	"Neon River"	Watson; Allbrook	Watson; Allbrook	4:12
4.	"So Lo"	Watson; Allbrook	Allbrook	3:48
5.	"Black Lung"	Ireland; Watson; Allbrook	Allbrook; Watson	4:28
6.	"Sunrise for the Lonely"	Allbrook	Allbrook	3:30
7.	"Elf Bar Blues"	Ireland	Instrumental	2:06
8.	"Edge of the World Pt. 3"	Watson; Allbrook; Joseph Ryan; Ireland	Allbrook; Ryan; Ireland	8:07
9.	"Stars In Silken Sheets"	Ryan; Allbrook	Allbrook	0:35
10.	"Boys Don't Crash"	Watson; Allbrook	Allbrook; Watson	3:46
11.	"O' UV Ray"	Ryan; Allbrook; Watson	Allbrook; Watson; Ryan	4:15
12.	"Last Elvis"	Allbrook; Ireland; Watson	Allbrook	3:34
13.	"Elephant Gun"	Allbrook; Ireland	Allbrook; Watson	3:16
14.	"Fell from Grace With the Sea"	Ryan; Allbrook	Allbrook	5:17
Total length:				54:25

== Personnel ==
Pond

- Nick Allbrook – production, engineering (all tracks); vocals (tracks 1–6, 8–14), guitar (2, 3, 5, 10, 12, 13), keyboards (8), bass guitar (12)
- James Ireland – production, mixing, engineering (all tracks); drums (tracks 1–3, 7, 13), keyboards (1, 2, 4, 8, 10–13), vocals (2, 4, 8, 10, 11, 14), bass guitar (4, 7), vocoder (5), guitar (7), piano (9)
- Joseph Ryan – production, engineering (all tracks); guitar (tracks 2, 3, 5, 8–11), vocals (4, 8, 10, 11), keyboards (8, 12, 14)
- Jamie Terry – production, engineering (all tracks); keyboards (2, 8), bass guitar (3, 5), percussion (9), vocals (10, 11, 14)
- Jay Watson – production, mixing, engineering (all tracks); guitar (1–8, 10–14), keyboards (1–8, 10–13), vocals (1–6, 10–14), drums (1, 6, 8, 10–14), bass guitar (5, 8, 10, 11, 14), glockenspiel (7, 9)

Additional contributors

- Joe Carra – mastering
- Sam Ford – engineering
- Reine Fiske – guitar solo, guitar engineering (track 8)
- Thea Woodward – saxophone, saxophone engineering (track 8)
- Jack Watson – outro vocals (track 10)
- James Richardson – French horn, trumpet, horn engineering (track 11)
- Sam Kristofski – photography
- Michael Tartaglia – inner sleeve band photo
- Pollen Arts Club – design

== Charts ==
Chart performance for Stung!
Chart (2021)	Peak position
Australian Albums (ARIA)	49
