= Corridors of Blissterday =

Studio album by Pond
- Released: 4 June 2009
- Recorded: September 2008
- Studio: Bang Bang Studios (Perth)
- Genres: Psychedelic rock; neo-psychedelia
- Length: 43:01; 54:56 (Apple Music edition)
- Label: Badminton Bandit
- Producer: Sam Ford

Pond chronology
Psychedelic Mango (2009)	Corridors of Blissterday (2009)	Frond (2010)

Corridors of Blissterday is the second studio album by Australian psychedelic rock band Pond, released in Australia on 4 June 2009, through local Perth label, Badminton Bandit. The album was recorded as a seven-piece band in five days, and only 200 CD-Rs were produced and released. The album was released digitally on Apple Music with two live tracks.

Drummer Jay Watson briefly left the band prior to recording. The remaining members, Joe Ryan and Nick Allbrook, recruited three new members to the band: "Cellestius Maximus Argyle" on drums, "Ayayai" on guitar, and "Aslan McPride" on synthesisers. Just as recording began, Watson returned to the band, this time playing the organ and singing.

In 2022, Western Australian Music and the State Library of Western Australia presented the "Corridors of Blissterday initiative", a competition open to Western Australian sound practitioners to "develop a contemporary work referencing and incorporating the State Library of Western Australia Heritage Collections." The competition was won by Sze "Samarobryn" Tsang.

Mastered versions of "Sweet Loretta" and "Mist in My Brainforest" were included on The Early Years: 2008–2010, which released on 12 April 2025.

== Track listing ==
Track lengths are taken from the liner notes, which incorrectly lists "Lightning Hip" as track four and "Mist in My Brainforest" as track five.

All tracks are written by Pond.

Corridors of Blissterday
No.	Title	Length
1.	"Corridors of Blissterday"	7:43
2.	"Caterpillar Mansion"	7:06
3.	"Sweet Loretta"	8:04
4.	"Mist in My Brainforest"	7:28
5.	"Lightning Hip"	4:50
6.	"Ascending"	7:50
Total length:		43:01

Apple Music bonus tracks
No.	Title	Length
7.	"Mist in My Brainforest (Live at Badminton Bandit Funraiser Party, Carlisle, 2009)"	5:29
8.	"Corridors of Blissterday (Live at Psychedelic Mango Launch Party, Norfolk Basement, 2009)"	6:26
Total length:		54:56

== Personnel ==
Adapted from the liner notes.

Pond

- Joe Ryan (credited as "Joseph Orion McJam")
- Nick Allbrook (credited as "Paisley Adams")
- Jay Watson (credited as "Wirey B. Buddha") – organ, vocals
- "Cellestius Maximus Argyle" – drums
- "Ayayai" – guitar
- "Aslan McPride" – synthesisers
- Felicity Groom – chromaharp, zither, ting (track 2), fuzz saw (track 3)

Additional

- Matt Saville – cover photo, disk design
- Steve Summerlin – insert photo
- David Egan – inside drawing
