= The Weather (Pond album) =

Studio album by Pond
- Released: 5 May 2017
- Studios: Kevin Parker's home studio (Fremantle, Western Australia)
- Genres: Psychedelic rock; psychedelic pop; neo-psychedelia
- Length: 39:44
- Label: Marathon Artists
- Producers: Kevin Parker; Pond

Pond chronology
Man It Feels Like Space Again (2015)	The Weather (2017)	Tasmania (2019)

Singles from The Weather
- 1. "Sweep Me Off My Feet" Released: 7 October 2016; 2. "30000 Megatons" Released: 10 November 2016; 3. "The Weather" Released: 17 March 2017; 4. "Paint Me Silver" Released: 20 April 2017; 5. "Fire In the Water" Released: 10 January 2018

The Weather is the seventh studio album by Australian psychedelic rock band Pond. It was released on 5 May 2017 by Marathon Artists. As with previous Pond albums, it is also co-produced by former member and Tame Impala frontman Kevin Parker. It was preceded by the singles "Sweep Me Off My Feet", "30000 Megatons", "The Weather", and "Paint Me Silver".

== Background ==
Pond frontman Nick Allbrook described The Weather as a "concept album, not completely about Perth, but focusing on all the weird contradictory things that make up a lot of colonial cities around the world. Laying out all the dark things underneath the shimmering exterior of cranes, development, money and white privilege. It’s not our place, but it is our place. British, but Australian, but not REAL Australian. On the edge of the world with a hell of a lot of fucked things defining our little city, still we try and live a wholesome respectful life, while being inherently disrespectful. At the end of all this confusion in our weird little white antipodean world, there’s the beach, purity and nature that brings us all together".

The album cover shows a photograph of the Carillon City mall in Hay Street, Perth, taken in the early 1980s.

== Critical reception ==
Professional ratings
Aggregate scores
Source	Rating
Metacritic	80/100
Review scores
Source	Rating
AllMusic	3.5/5 stars
Classic Rock	4/5 stars
DIY	4/5 stars
Exclaim!	4/5 stars
The Guardian	4/5 stars
Pitchfork	7.7/10

The Weather received positive reviews from music critics, holding an average critic score of 80, based on 16 reviews, indicating "generally favorable reviews". Saby Reyes-Kulkarni of Pitchfork wrote that "For all its disjointedness, the album never wanders more than a few inches away from the sublime. It’s a document of a band knocking loudly on the door of greatness." Marcy Donelson for Allmusic described the album as "trippy and shambolic". Donelson also praised its "epic, sometimes otherworldly luster". Gwilym Mumford in The Guardian wrote that the album is "Accessible but still absolutely out there, this is prog, but not as we know it."

== Track listing ==
No.	Title	Writer(s)	Lead vocals	Length
1.	"30000 Megatons"	Nick Allbrook; Jay Watson	Allbrook	4:02
2.	"Sweep Me Off My Feet"	Allbrook; Watson	Allbrook	3:29
3.	"Paint Me Silver"	Allbrook; Watson; Todd Rundgren	Allbrook	3:44
4.	"Colder Than Ice"	Watson	Watson	3:10
5.	"Edge of the World, Pt. 1"	Allbrook; Watson	Allbrook	4:54
6.	"A/B"	Allbrook; Watson	Allbrook	3:28
7.	"Zen Automaton"	Allbrook	Allbrook	4:01
8.	"All I Want for Xmas (Is a Tascam 388)"	Joe Ryan; Watson	Ryan	2:36
9.	"Edge of the World, Pt. 2"	Allbrook; Ryan; Watson	Allbrook	6:22
10.	"The Weather"	Allbrook; Watson	Allbrook; Watson	3:58
Total length:				39:44

2017 Japanese issue bonus track
No.	Title	Writer(s)	Lead vocals	Length
11.	"Fire In the Water"	Allbrook	Allbrook	4:04
Total length:				43:48

== Personnel ==
Pond

- Nicholas Allbrook
- Jay Watson
- Joe Ryan
- Jamie Terry

Additional musicians

- Christian Ruggiero – horns on "30000 Megatons" and "Zen Automaton", saxophone on "Colder Than Ice"
- Jamie Canny, Sam Newman – horns on "30000 Megatons" and "Zen Automaton"
- Mei Saraswåati – additional vocals on "Sweep Me Off My Feet" and "Colder Than Ice"
- James SK Wān – bamboo flute on "Colder Than Ice"
- Kirin J Callinan – additional vocals on "Paint Me Silver" and "Colder Than Ice", guitar noises on "Edge of the World, Pt. 2"
- James Ireland – piano and some production on "A/B"

Production

- Production – Kevin Parker and Pond
- Engineering – Pond, Kevin Parker, Richard Ingham
- Mastering – Greg Calbi
- Packaging design – Alex Joseph

== Charts ==
Chart (2017)	Peak position
Australian Albums (ARIA)	33
Australian Physical Albums (ARIA)	23
Belgian Albums (Ultratop Flanders)	126
Belgian Albums (Ultratop Wallonia)	132
Scottish Albums (Official Charts)	83
