= Psychedelic Mango =

Studio album by Pond
- Released: 9 January 2009
- Recorded: 2008
- Studio: Nick Allbrook's parents' house (Daglish, Western Australia)
- Genre: Psychedelic rock; neo-psychedelia
- Length: 41:10; 49:41 (Apple Music edition)
- Label: Badminton Bandit
- Producer: Sam Ford

Pond chronology
Psychedelic Mango (2009)	Corridors of Blissterday (2009)

Psychedelic Mango is the debut studio album by Australian psychedelic rock band Pond, released in Australia on 9 January 2009, through local Perth label, Badminton Bandit. The album was recorded in the granny flat of Nick Allbrook's parents' house on an 8-track tape, and only 500 CDs were produced and released. The album was released digitally on Apple Music with two live tracks.

Prior to forming Pond, Nick Allbrook and Joe Ryan were members of Mink Mussel Creek, along with Kevin Parker. After the band failed to release an album in six years, the members went their separate ways. Allbrook, Ryan, and their friend, Jay Watson, formed Pond under a mulberry tree in Daglish, a small western suburb of Perth, Western Australia. They conceived the idea of "an album of tropical psychedelic idiocy".

On 28 October 2014, Pond performed "Don't Look at the Sun or You'll Go Blind" on KEXP-FM. An extended six-minute version of the song was rerecorded and released as a single for the band's 2019 live album, Sessions. It is the only song from the album played live, and often closes out the band's sets. Mastered versions of "That Is How We Came", "Psychedelic Mango Vision", and "Don't Look at the Sun or You'll Go Blind" were included on The Early Years: 2008–2010, which released on 12 April 2025.

== Track listing ==
All tracks are written by Pond.

Psychedelic Mango
No.	Title	Length
1.	"That Is How We Came"	6:01
2.	"Psychedelic Mango Vision"	4:53
3.	"Gringolet's Drunken Baggage"	7:10
4.	"Sweeping My Mind Tunnel"	1:34
5.	"Don't Look at the Sun or You'll Go Blind"	2:54
6.	"Mick Manmoose"	5:34
7.	"Paisley Adams"	3:52
8.	"Bees": "B"; "Pollen"; "B (reprise)"; "Pond Loves You"	9:12: 3:02; 2:26; 1:59; 1:45
Total length:		41:10

Apple Music bonus tracks
No.	Title	Length
9.	"Don't Look at the Sun or You'll Go Blind (Live at John Curtin Band Room, Melbourne, 2010)"	4:13
10.	"Mick Manmoose (Live at Mojos, Fremantle, 2009)"	4:18
Total length:		49:41
