= Jay Watson =

Australian musician (born 1990)

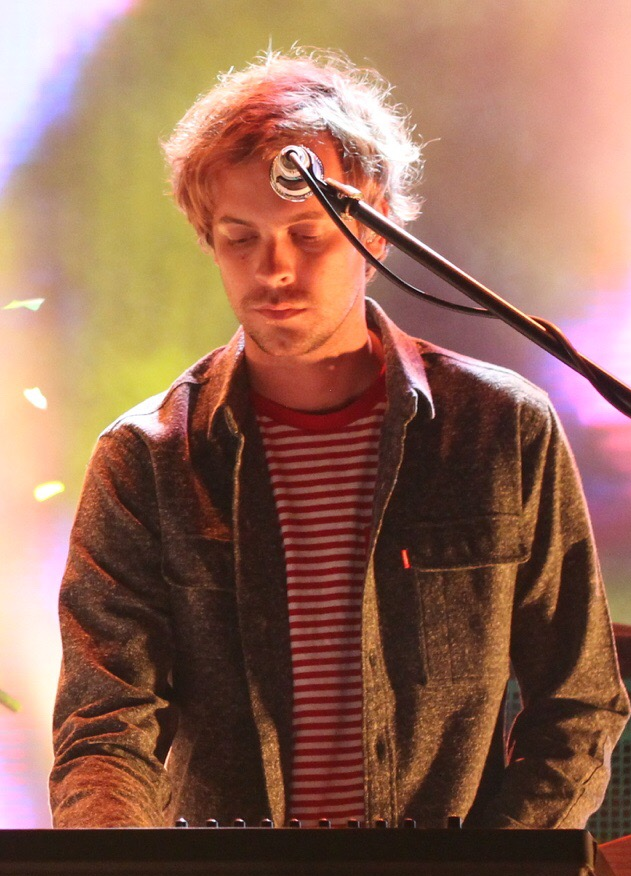
- Watson in 2016

Background information
- Also known as: GUM; Wesley Goldtouch
- Born: Carnarvon, Western Australia, Australia
- Origin: Northam, Western Australia, Australia
- Genres: Psychedelic rock; psychedelic pop; synth-pop; space rock; electronic music; funk rock; glam rock; dream pop; neo-psychedelia; synthwave; symphonic rock
- Occupations: Musician; producer; singer; songwriter; multi-instrumentalist; mix engineer
- Instruments: Vocals; guitar; drums; bass; keyboards
- Years active: 2005–present
- Labels: Spinning Top Records; p(doom)
- Member of: Pond; Tame Impala (touring member)
- Spinoffs: GUM & Ginoli; GUM with Ambrose Kenny-Smith

Jay Wesley Watson is an Australian multi-instrumentalist, producer, mixer, singer and songwriter. He is best known as a touring member of the psychedelic band Tame Impala and as a co-founder of the psychedelic rock band Pond, with whom he has recorded eleven albums. Watson also records solo material under the name GUM and, as of 2026, has released seven solo studio albums under this name.

Watson occasionally collaborates with fellow Pond member James "Gin" Ireland as the duo GUM & Ginoli, remixing songs originally recorded by a variety of different artists, and occasionally contributes production and mixing to the solo projects of fellow Pond members as well as other musicians. In 2023, Watson began collaborating with King Gizzard and the Lizard Wizard member Ambrose Kenny-Smith as a duo under the name GUM with Ambrose Kenny-Smith, releasing their first studio album, Ill Times, in July 2024.

As of October 2026, Watson has contributed to eleven studio albums, one live album, and two extended plays with Pond; has released seven solo studio albums under the name GUM; has contributed to two studio albums, one live album, and two extended plays with Tame Impala; has released two collaborative GUM albums with Kenny-Smith; has released multiple remixes of songs with Ireland; and has produced, mixed, or performed with a number of up-and-coming acts.

== Career ==
Jay Wesley Watson was born in Carnarvon, and grew up in Northam, Western Australia. He was given the nickname Gumby, which referred to the clay animation TV show of the same name. When he began recording his own material, Watson shortened the name to GUM.

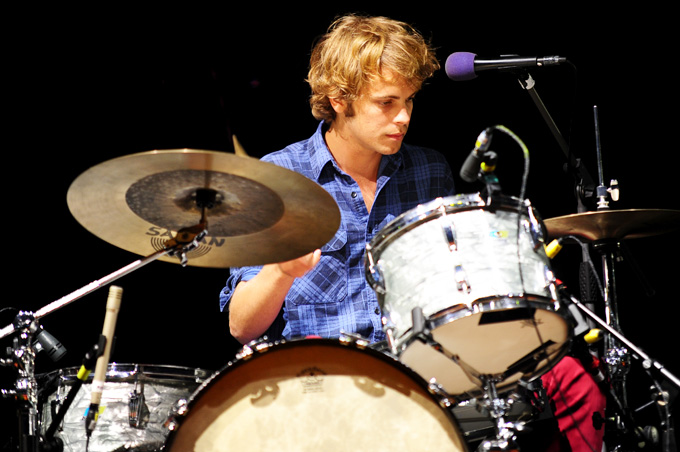
Watson drumming with Tame Impala in July 2011

Under the GUM moniker, Watson released Delorean Highway digitally in Australia on 30 May 2014. Most of the material had been recorded in 2011, leaving Watson to note that "when it finally came out it felt so good! But it felt so old to me". An LP release of Delorean Highway was restricted to a thousand copies. The album was described as a collection of "paranoid pop songs" that are "mostly about falling in love and all of the things that he [Watson] thinks are going to kill him." In October 2019, Delorean Highway came at no.19 on Happy Mag's list of "The 25 best psychedelic rock albums of the 2010s".

In September 2014, Watson recorded his second album in London with the assistance of Jerome Watson. The thirteen track Glamorous Damage, was announced in September 2015 and was released on 13 November 2015. It was preceded by the single "Anaesthetized Lesson", which was remixed by Kevin Parker and released in March 2016. Watson described the title of the album as "about people glamorizing getting fucked up or being weirdos, when there is always a danger you could end up damaged yourself just through putting it on a pedestal". Watson occasionally performs live, using backing tracks. Pitchfork's Stuart Berman described the album as "the 8-bit, Nintendo video game adaptation of a blockbuster film".

On 3 November 2016, a third album titled Flash In the Pan, was teased on YouTube, and released on 11 November 2016. It was preceded by the single "Gemini". Described by the NME as "a swirl of looped vocals, Pond-y synth work and dreamy, subtle bass". Watson explained that it was "the first song I recorded for the album, and probably the most immediate". It featured a contribution by Sergio Flores on saxophone.

Watson currently resides in Beaconsfield, a suburb nearby to Fremantle in Perth, Western Australia. In December 2019, he and his girlfriend Lucy welcomed a son, Jack.

== Discography ==
=== Albums as GUM ===
—Studio albums:

- Delorean Highway (2014)
- Glamorous Damage (2015)
- Flash In the Pan (2016)
- The Underdog (2018)
- Out In the World (2020)
- Saturnia (2023)
- Blue Gum Way (2026)

=== Albums as GUM with Ambrose Kenny-Smith ===
—Studio albums:

- Ill Times (2024)

—Live albums:

- Live at the Corner (2025)

=== Singles ===
- "Anesthetized Lesson" (2015)
- "Elafonissi Blue" (2015)
- "Gemini" (2016)
- "Deep Razz" (2016)
- "The Underdog" (2018)
- "The Blue Marble" (2018)
- "Out In the World" (2020)
- "Airwalkin'" (2020)
- "Low to Low" (2020)
- "Ancients" (2022; from Glamorous Damage remaster)
- "Minor Setback / Old Transistor Radio" (2023) with Ambrose Kenny-Smith
- "Race to the Air" (2023)
- "Would It Pain You to See?" (2023)
- "Music Is Bigger Than Hair" (2023)
- "Argentina" (2023)
- "Ill Times" (2024) with Ambrose Kenny-Smith
- "Dud" (2024) with Ambrose Kenny-Smith
- "Telescope" (2025; from Ill Times deluxe edition) with Ambrose Kenny-Smith
- "Snow Angels" (2025; from Ill Times deluxe edition) with Ambrose Kenny-Smith
- "Uncharted Waters" (2025; from Ill Times deluxe edition) with Ambrose Kenny-Smith
- "Jump Into the Fire" (2025; from Live at the Corner) with Ambrose Kenny-Smith
- "Expanding Blue" (2025)
- "Celluloid" (2026)
- "In Life" (2026)

=== With Pond ===
—Studio albums:

- Psychedelic Mango (2009)
- Corridors of Blissterday (2009)
- Frond (2010) (credited as Wesley Goldtouch)
- Beard, Wives, Denim (2012)
- Hobo Rocket (2013)
- Man It Feels Like Space Again (2015)
- The Weather (2017)
- Tasmania (2019)
- 9 (2021)
- Stung! (2024)
- Terrestrials (2026)

—Live albums:

- Sessions (2019)

—Compilation albums:

- The Early Years: 2008–2010 (2025)

—Extended plays:

- Greens Pool (2010)
- Live at the BBC (2022)

=== With Tame Impala ===
—Studio albums:

- Innerspeaker (2010), drums on "Solitude Is Bliss", "The Bold Arrow of Time", "Island Walking".
- Lonerism (2012), piano on "Apocalypse Dreams", keyboards on "Elephant," both of which he cowrote

—Live albums:

- Live Versions (2014), keyboards on all tracks

—Extended plays:

- Tame Impala (2008), drums on "Wander", keyboards on "Forty-One Mosquitoes Flying in Formation"
- Live at the Corner EP (2010), drums on all tracks
