= List of awards and nominations received by Tame Impala =

Tame Impala awards and nominations
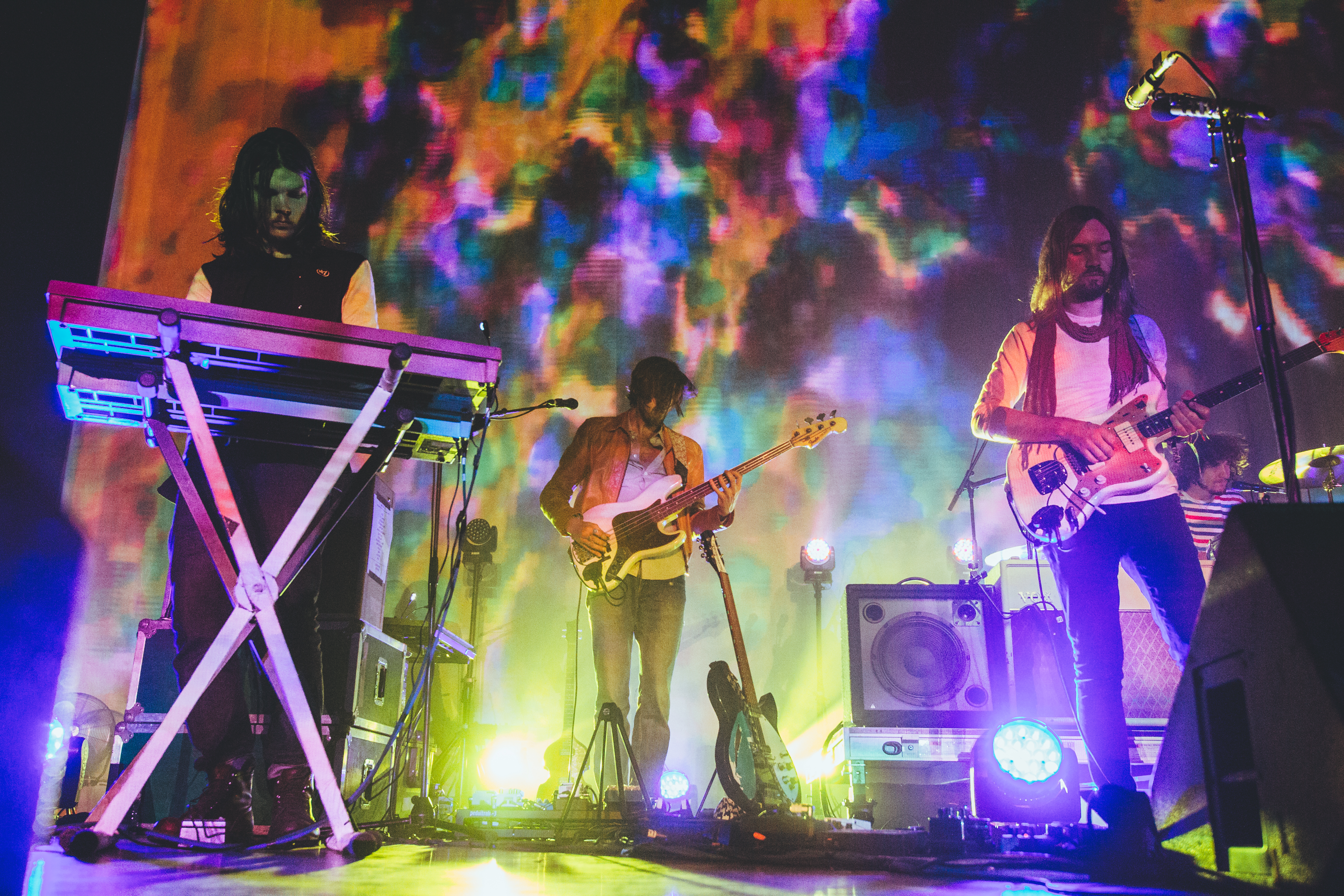
- Tame Impala performing at a concert in 2014
Awards and nominations
Award	Wins	Nominations
American Music Awards	0	4
APRA Awards	2	4
ARIA Awards	13	27
Australian Music Prize	0	3
Billboard Music Awards	0	2
Brit Awards	1	1
EG Music Awards	1	1
Grammy Award	2	9
J Awards	2	3
MTV Europe Music Awards	0	3
MTV Video Music Awards	0	3
NME Awards	0	3
Nickelodeon Kids' Choice Awards	0	1
NRJ Music Awards	0	1
Rolling Stone Australia Awards	2	2
UK Music Video Awards	3	5
WAMI Awards	15	26
Isabel Awards	1	1
- Totals
Awards won	40
Nominations	95

The following awards and nominations have been received by Tame Impala.

== American Music Awards ==
The American Music Awards (the AMA's) is an annual American music awards show, generally held in the Fall. It is one of Big Four Music Award Shows.

Year	Category	Nominated work	Result	Ref.
2020	Favorite Artist - Alternative Rock	Tame Impala	Nominated	
2026	Song of the Summer	"Dracula" (with Jennie)	Nominated	
2026	Best Rock/Alternative Song	"Dracula"	Nominated	
2026	Best Rock/Alternative Album	Deadbeat	Nominated	

== APRA Awards ==
The APRA Awards have been presented annually from 1982 by the Australasian Performing Right Association (APRA), "honouring composers and songwriters".

Year	Category	Nominated work	Result	Ref.
2011	Breakthrough Songwriter of the Year	Kevin Parker	Nominated	
2013	APRA Song of the Year	"Feels Like We Only Go Backwards"	Won	
2013	APRA Song of the Year	"Elephant"	Nominated	
2016	APRA Song of the Year	"Let It Happen"	Won	
2016	APRA Song of the Year	"Eventually"	Shortlisted	
2020	Song of the Year	"Borderline"	Shortlisted	
2021	APRA Song of the Year	"Is It True?"	Shortlisted	
2021	APRA Song of the Year	"It Might Be Time"	Shortlisted	
2021	APRA Song of the Year	"Lost in Yesterday"	Nominated	
2021	Most Performed Alternative Work	"Lost in Yesterday"	Nominated	
2021	Songwriter of the Year	Kevin Parker	Won	
2024	Song of the Year	"New Gold" by Gorillaz (featuring Tame Impala and Bootie Brown)	Shortlisted	
2026	Song of the Year	"End of Summer" by Tame Impala (Kevin Parker)	Shortlisted	
2026	Song of the Year	"Loser" by Tame Impala (Kevin Parker)	Shortlisted	

== ARIA Awards ==
The ARIA Music Awards, hosted by the Australian Recording Industry Association (ARIA), recognise "excellence and innovation across all genres" of music in Australia.

Year	Category	Nominated work	Result	Ref.
2010	Best Group	Innerspeaker	Nominated	
2010	Breakthrough Artist	Innerspeaker	Nominated	
2010	Album of the Year	Innerspeaker	Nominated	
2010	Best Rock Album	Innerspeaker	Nominated	
2010	Best Cover Art	Innerspeaker	Nominated	
2013	Best Group	Lonerism	Won	
2013	Best Australian Live Act	Lonerism Tour	Nominated	
2013	Album of the Year	Lonerism	Won	
2013	Best Rock Album	Lonerism	Won	
2013	Best Cover Art	Lonerism	Nominated	
2013	Engineer of the Year	Kevin Parker - Lonerism	Nominated	
2013	Producer of the Year	Kevin Parker - Lonerism	Nominated	
2014	Best Australian Live Act	Big Day Out 2014	Nominated	
2015	Album of the Year	Currents	Won	
2015	Best Rock Album	Currents	Won	
2015	Best Pop Release	"Let It Happen"	Nominated	
2015	Best Group	Currents	Won	
2015	Engineer of the Year	Kevin Parker - Tame Impala	Won	
2015	Producer of the Year	Kevin Parker - Tame Impala	Won	
2016	Best Australian Live Act	Australian Tour	Nominated	
2019	Engineer of the Year	"Patience"	Nominated	
2019	Producer of the Year	"Patience"	Nominated	
2020	Album of the Year	The Slow Rush	Won	
2020	Best Group	The Slow Rush	Won	
2020	Best Rock Album	The Slow Rush	Won	
2020	Best Pop Release	"Lost in Yesterday"	Nominated	
2020	Best Video	"Is It True"	Nominated	
2020	Engineer of the Year	Kevin Parker - The Slow Rush	Won	
2020	Producer of the Year	Kevin Parker - The Slow Rush	Won	
2023	Best Australian Live Act	Slow Rush Tour	Nominated	
2025	Best Produced Release	Kevin Parker for "End of Summer"	Won	
2025	Best Engineered Release	Kevin Parker for "End of Summer"	Won	
2026	Album of the Year	Deadbeat	Won	
2026	Best Solo Artist	Deadbeat	Won	
2026	Best Alternative Release	Deadbeat	Nominated	
2026	Best Pop Release	"Dracula"	Won	
2026	Song of the Year	"Dracula"	Won	
2026	Best Dance/Electronic Release	"Afterthought"	Nominated	
2026	Best Produced Release	Kevin Parker for Deadbeat	Won	
2026	Best Engineered Release	Kevin Parker for Deadbeat	Won	
2026	Global Impact Award	Tame Impala	Awarded	

== Australian Music Prize ==
The Australian Music Prize (the AMP) is an annual award of $30,000 given to an Australian band or solo artist in recognition of the merit of an album released during the year of award. The commenced in 2005.

Year	Category	Nominated work	Result	Ref.
2010	Australian Music Prize	Innerspeaker	Nominated	
2012	Australian Music Prize	Lonerism	Nominated	
2015	Australian Music Prize	Currents	Nominated	
2020	Australian Music Prize	The Slow Rush	Nominated	

== Berlin Music Video Awards ==
Year	Category	Nominated work	Result	Ref.
2016	Best Art Director	The Less I Know The Better	Nominated	
2024	Best Animation	One Night / All Night	Nominated	

== Billboard Music Awards ==
The Billboard Music Awards are given to artists based on sales data by Nielsen SoundScan and radio information by Nielsen Broadcast Data Systems.

Year	Category	Nominated work	Result	Ref.
2020	Top Rock Artist	Tame Impala	Nominated	
2020	Top Rock Album	The Slow Rush	Nominated	

== Brit Awards ==
The Brit Awards are the British Phonographic Industry's (BPI) annual pop music awards.

Year	Category	Nominated work	Result	Ref.
2016	Best International Group	Tame Impala	Won	
2021	Best International Male Solo Artist	Tame Impala	Nominated	
2026	Best International Group	Tame Impala	Nominated	

== EG Music Awards ==
The Age Music Victoria Awards are an annual Awards night celebrating Victorian music.

Year	Category	Nominated work	Result	Ref.
2012	Best Song	"Elephant"	Won	

== Grammy Awards ==
The Grammy Awards are awarded annually by The Recording Academy of the United States for outstanding achievements in the music industry.

Year	Category	Nominated work	Result	Ref.
2014	Best Alternative Music Album	Lonerism	Nominated	
2016	Best Alternative Music Album	Currents	Nominated	
2021	Best Alternative Music Album	The Slow Rush	Nominated	
2021	Best Rock Song	"Lost in Yesterday"	Nominated	
2025	Best Dance/Electronic Recording	"Neverender" (with Justice)	Won	
2026	Best Dance/Electronic Recording	"End of Summer"	Won	
2027	Record of the Year	"Dracula" (with Jennie)	Pending	
2027	Best Pop Duo/Group Performance	"Dracula" (with Jennie)	Pending	
2027	Best Dance/Electronic Album	Deadbeat	Pending	
2027	Best Dance/Electronic Recording	"My Old Ways"	Pending	

== J Awards ==
The J Awards were established by influential Australian youth radio station Triple J in 2005.

Year	Category	Nominated work	Result	Ref.
2010	Australian Album of the Year	Innerspeaker	Won	
2012	Australian Album of the Year	Lonerism	Won	
2015	Australian Album of the Year	Currents	Nominated	
2020	Australian Album of the Year	The Slow Rush	Nominated	
2025	Australian Album of the Year	Deadbeat	Nominated	
2026	Australian Live Act of the Year	Tame Impala	Nominated	

== Helpmann Awards ==
The Helpmann Awards is an awards show, celebrating live entertainment and performing arts in Australia, presented by industry group Live Performance Australia since 2001. Note: 2020 and 2021 were cancelled due to the COVID-19 pandemic.

Year	Nominee / work	Award	Result	Ref.
2014	Tame Impala	Best Australian Contemporary Concert	Nominated	

== MTV Awards ==
=== MTV Europe Music Awards ===
The MTV Europe Music Awards were established in 1994 by MTV Networks Europe to celebrate the most popular music videos in Europe.

Year	Category	Nominated work	Result	Ref.
2016	Best Video	The Less I Know the Better	Nominated	
2016	Best Alternative	Tame Impala	Nominated	
2020	Best Rock	Tame Impala	Nominated	
2022	Best Alternative	Tame Impala	Nominated	

=== MTV Video Music Awards ===
The MTV Video Music Awards were established in the end of the summer of 1984 by MTV to celebrate the top music videos of the year.

Year	Category	Nominated work	Result	Ref.
2016	Best Direction	"The Less I Know the Better"	Nominated	
2026	Best Alternative	"Dracula"	Nominated	
2026	Song of Summer	"Dracula" (with Jennie)	Nominated	

== National Live Music Awards ==
The National Live Music Awards (NLMAs) commenced in 2016 to recognize contributions to the live music industry in Australia.

Year	Nominee / work	Award	Result	Ref.
2023	Rob Sinclair (Tame Impala)	Best Stage & Light Design	Nominated	

== Nickelodeon Kids' Choice Awards ==
The Nickelodeon Kids' Choice Awards was established by the American television channel Nickelodeon in 1987 and honors the year's biggest in television, film, music, and sports as voted by viewers worldwide.

Year	Category	Nominated work	Result	Ref.
2026	Favorite Music Collaboration	"Dracula" (with Jennie)	Won	

== NME Awards ==
The NME Awards were created by the NME magazine and was first held in 1953.

Year	Category	Nominated work	Result	Ref.
2016	Best International Band	Tame Impala	Nominated	
2016	Best Album	Currents	Nominated	
2016	Best Music Video	"The Less I Know the Better"	Nominated	

== NRJ Music Awards ==
The NRJ Music Awards are presented by the French radio station NRJ since 2000 to honor the best in the French and worldwide music industry.

Year	Category	Nominated work	Result	Ref.
2026	International Collaboration of the Year	"Dracula" (with Jennie)	Nominated	

== Rolling Stone Australian Awards ==
Rolling Stone Australia Awards are awarded annually in January by the Rolling Stone (Australia) magazine since 2010 for outstanding contributions to popular culture in the previous year.

Year	Category	Nominated work	Result	Ref.
2011	Album of the Year	Innerspeaker	Won	
2012	Album of the Year	Lonerism	Won	
2021	Best Record	The Slow Rush	Nominated	
2024	Rolling Stone Global Award	Tame Impala	Nominated	

== UK Music Video Awards ==
The UK Music Video Awards are British annual awards held to recognize creativity, technical excellence and innovation in music video and moving image for music.

Year	Category	Nominated work	Result	Ref.
2013	Best Rock/Indie Video - UK	"Mind Mischief"	Nominated	
2015	Best Rock/Indie Video - International	"Let It Happen"	Won	
2016	Best Rock/Indie Video - International	"The Less I Know the Better"	Won	
2016	Best Production Design in a Video	"The Less I Know the Better"	Nominated	
2016	Best Styling in a Video	"The Less I Know the Better"	Nominated	
2016	Best Cinematography in a Video	"The Less I Know the Better"	Nominated	
2019	Best Urban Video - International	"Sundress" (with A$AP Rocky)	Won	
2019	Best Cinematography in a Video	"Sundress" (with A$AP Rocky)	Nominated	

== WAMI Awards ==
WAMI began presenting awards in 2001 in Perth, representing local artists in the West Australian music scene.

Year	Category	Nominated work	Result	Ref.
2009	Most Popular Act	Tame Impala	Nominated	
2009	Most Popular Live Act	Tame Impala	Nominated	
2009	Favourite Newcomer	Tame Impala	Won	
2009	Most Promising New Act	Tame Impala	Won	
2009	Best Rock Act	Tame Impala	Nominated	
2009	Most Popular Single/EP	Tame Impala EP	Won	
2009	Most Popular Music Video	"Half Full Glass of Wine"	Nominated	
2009	Best Male Vocalist	Kevin Parker	Nominated	
2009	Best Bassist	Dominic Simper	Nominated	
2009	Best Drummer	Jay Watson	Nominated	
2010	Best Rock Act	Tame Impala	Nominated	
2011	Most Popular Act	Tame Impala	Won	
2011	Most Popular Live Act	Tame Impala	Won	
2011	Best Rock Act	Tame Impala	Won	
2011	Most Popular Album	Innerspeaker	Nominated	
2011	Best Guitarist	Kevin Parker	Won	
2013	Group of the Year	Tame Impala	Won	
2013	Single of the Year	"Feels Like We Only Go Backwards"	Won	
2013	Album of the Year	Lonerism	Won	
2013	Music Video of the Year	"Elephant"	Won	
2015	Best Rock Act	Tame Impala	Nominated	
2015	Most Popular Act	Tame Impala	Won	
2015	Most Popular Live Act	Tame Impala	Won	
2015	Best Album	Currents	Won	
2015	Best Single	"Let It Happen"	Nominated	
2015	Most Popular Music Video	"Let It Happen"	Won	
2020	Best Album	The Slow Rush	Won	
2020	Best Rock Act	Tame Impala	Nominated	
