= Currents (album) =

2015 studio album by Tame Impala

Studio album by Tame Impala
- Released: 17 July 2015
- Recorded: 2012–2015
- Studios: Kevin Parker's home studio, Fremantle, Western Australia
- Genres: Psychedelic pop; synth-pop; disco; R&B
- Length: 51:12
- Label: Modular
- Producer: Kevin Parker

Tame Impala chronology
Live Versions (2014)	Currents (2015)	The Slow Rush (2020)

Singles from Currents
- 1. "Let It Happen" Released: 11 March 2015; 2. "'Cause I'm a Man" Released: 7 April 2015; 3. "Eventually" Released: 15 June 2015; 4. "The Less I Know the Better" Released: 29 November 2015

Currents is the third studio album by Australian musical project Tame Impala, released on 17 July 2015 by Modular Recordings. It was released by Interscope Records in the United States and by Fiction Records in the United Kingdom, while Caroline International released it in other regions. Like the project's previous two albums, Currents was written, recorded, performed, and produced by Kevin Parker. For the first time, Parker mixed the music and recorded all instruments by himself; the album featured no other collaborators.

After the release of his previous album, Lonerism (2012), Parker began work on Currents, largely recording at his home studio in Fremantle. He engrossed himself with writing and recording, and in keeping with his reputation as a musical auteur, laboured over the details of each song, ultimately causing the release date to be delayed by two months. In contrast to the psychedelic rock sound of the project's prior work, Currents marks a shift to more dance-oriented music, with more emphasis placed on synthesisers than guitars. Parker was inspired to seek a change out of desire to hear Tame Impala's music played in dance clubs and a more communal setting. Thematically, the record is about the process of personal transformation, which many critics interpreted to be the result of a romantic breakup. The album's cover art depicting vortex shedding is a visualisation of these themes.

Currents was supported by the release of the singles "Let It Happen", "'Cause I'm a Man", "Eventually" and "The Less I Know the Better". The album became the project's best charting release, debuting at number one in Australia, number three in the United Kingdom, and at number four in the United States. As of January 2023, Currents has sold over one million copies in the United States. Like its predecessors, the album received critical acclaim and appeared on various critics' lists of the best albums of 2015. At the 2015 ARIA Music Awards, Currents was awarded Best Rock Album and Album of the Year, and it also received nominations for the Grammy Award for Best Alternative Music Album and the J Award for Australian Album of the Year. In December 2021, the album was listed at number 12 in Rolling Stone Australia's list of the "200 Greatest Australian Albums of All Time", and in 2020, Rolling Stone ranked Currents 382nd on its list of "The 500 Greatest Albums of All Time".

== Background ==
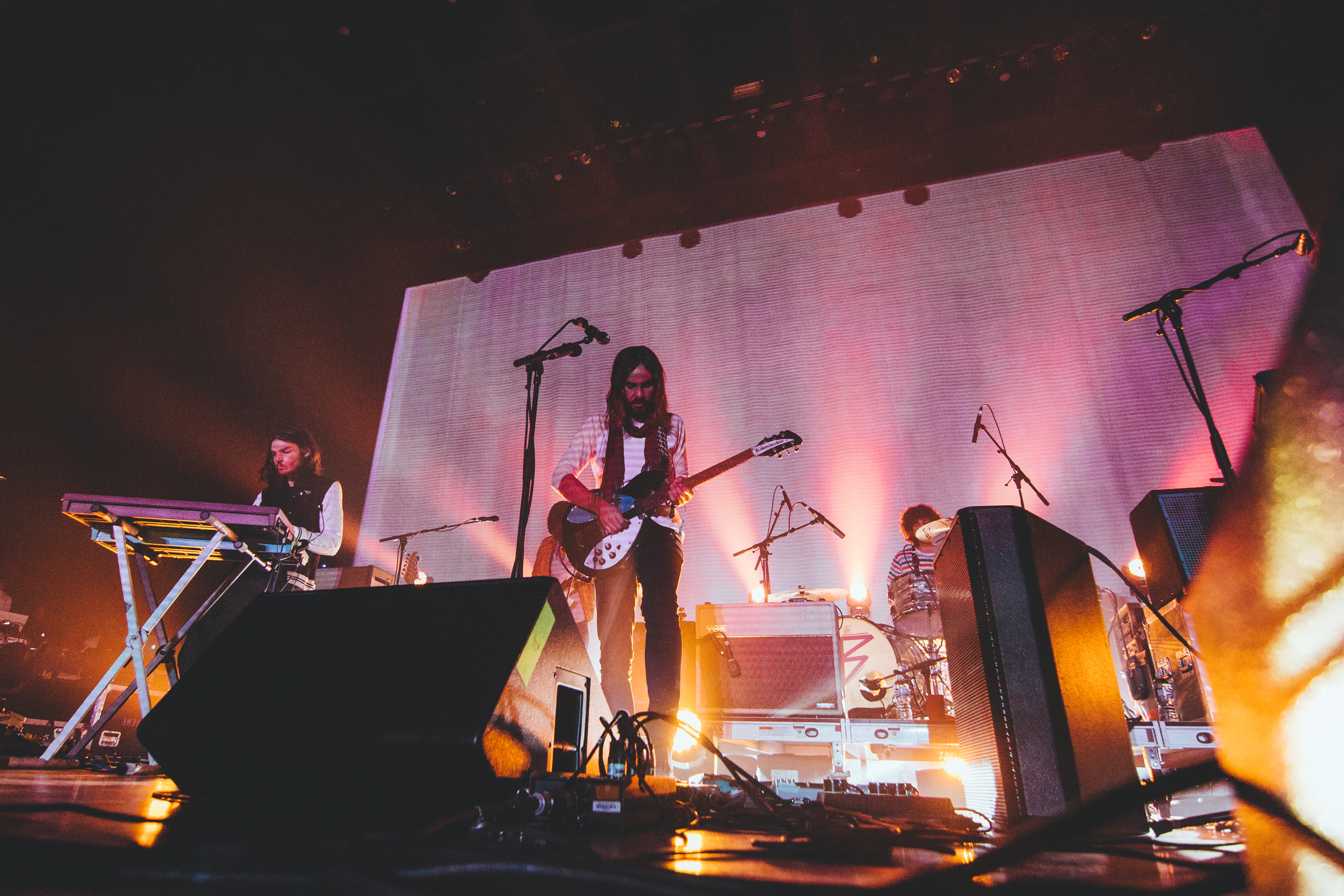
Tame Impala performing in 2014

Tame Impala emerged in the early 2010s as one of psychedelic rock's most prominent new acts. The group, fronted by musician Kevin Parker, released two albums that received adoration from music critics: Innerspeaker (2010) and Lonerism (2012). "Elephant" became an alt-rock radio hit, and was placed in several television series and commercials. Parker founded the band and is typically the sole operating member in the studio. In between Tame Impala releases, Parker founded the space disco band AAA Aardvark Getdown Services.

He began writing songs shortly after completing Lonerism, but was unable to specify when the album began to take shape: "There’s never really a start and never really an end either." The idea to compile his songs into an album came when he had between 10–20 songs ready. In May 2014, Parker spoke of his growing inclination toward recording the album in a triple J radio interview, explaining that: "I'm getting more and more sucked into the world of making an album. It's weird how it happens naturally, it's almost feels like a seasonal thing. I've started to think about tracklistings and all the things that come with an album."

The album's change in style has root in several events. Parker began to feel that even songs outside the psychedelic genre could possess its qualities; he made this assumption while under the influence of psychedelic mushrooms and cocaine and listening to the Bee Gees' "Stayin' Alive". At some point, Parker broke up with his girlfriend, French singer-songwriter Melody Prochet, and moved from Paris back to his hometown of Perth. According to Parker, "the only rule was to make an attempt to abandon the rules that I've set up in the past." This included toying with things he considered musically "cheesy" or taboo, including drum machines and various effects.

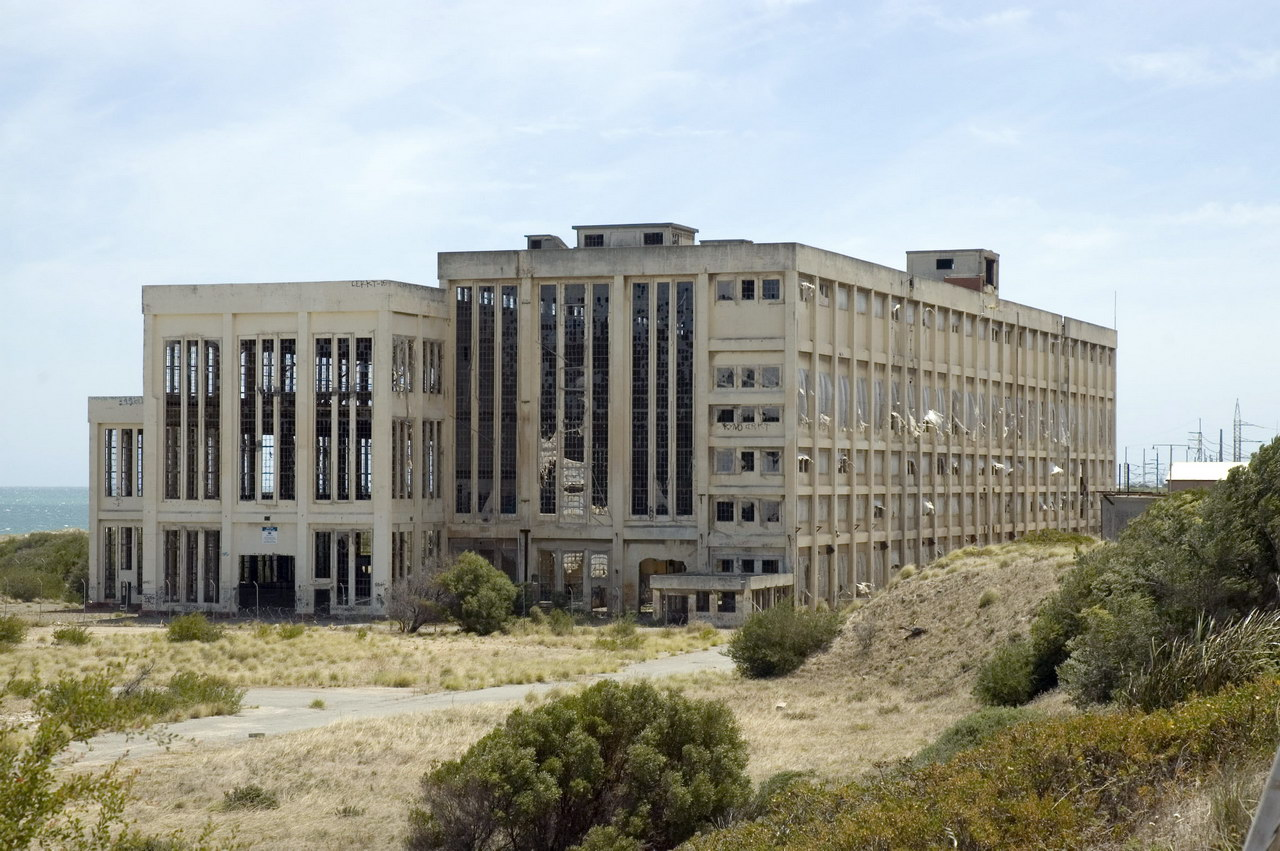
The South Fremantle Power Station inspired the album's title and some of its lyrical content.

The album title Currents references the abandoned South Fremantle Power Station, where Parker found inspiration during the writing process for the album. He recalled, "A lot of the songs on Currents have passages that were directly inspired by the power house and doing laps of it. It is scary and confronting, but such a beautiful thing." Parker also wrote many of the album's lyrics on nearby beaches, including Fremantle's South Beach. "There are many things that seep into your music and one of them is where you live", he later said. "I suddenly remembered the value of being somewhere serene and beautiful and getting inspired in that way."

== Recording and production ==
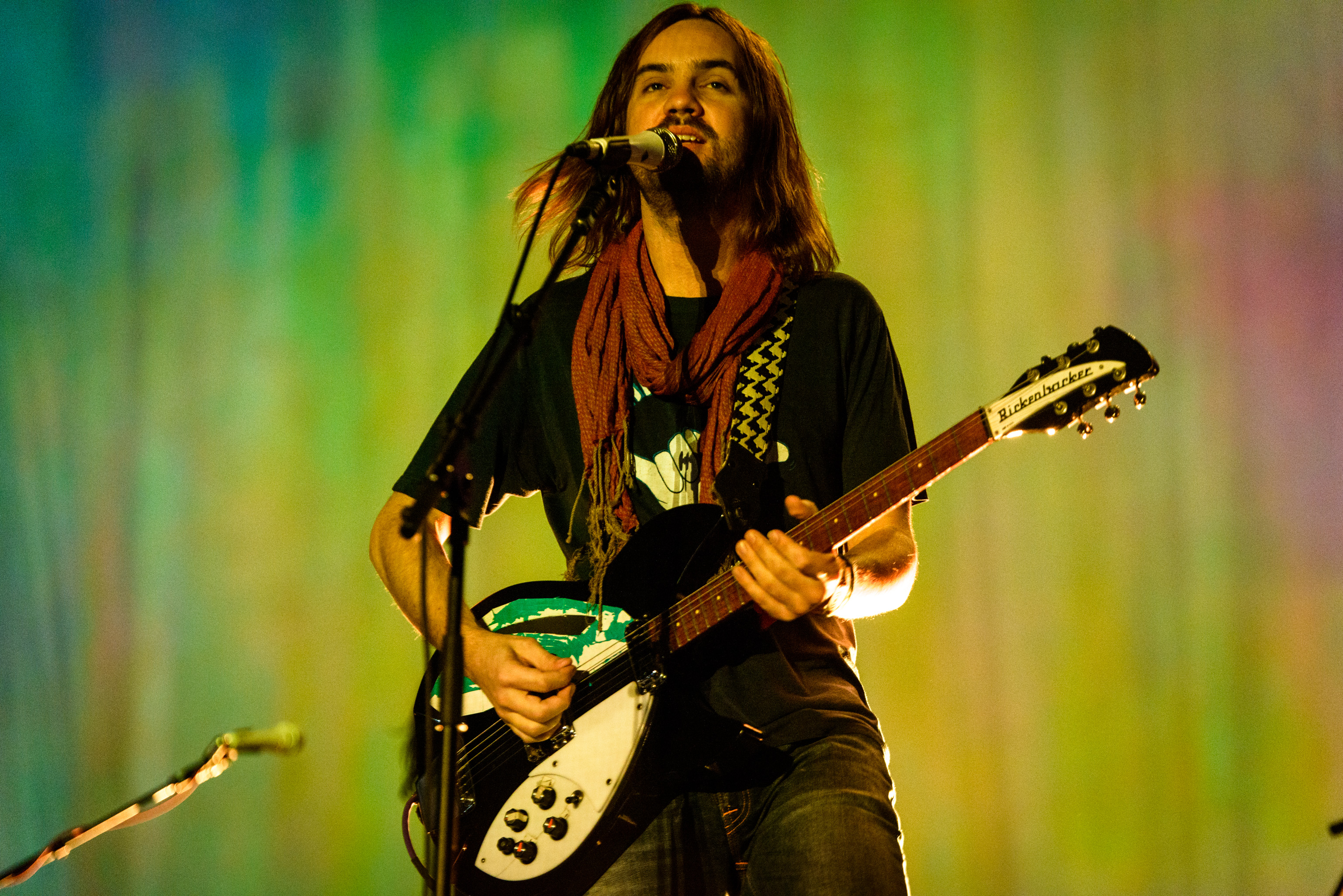
Kevin Parker (pictured in 2015) recorded, produced and mixed Currents.

Currents was recorded, produced, and mixed by Kevin Parker at his beachside home studio in Fremantle, Western Australia. The two-room studio contained a minimal amount of equipment: "a ramshackle drum kit, a guitar covered in duct tape and some battered vintage synths." Parker likened his small setup to an aeroplane cockpit. In an adjoining room, he began designing the light show that would accompany live performances of the album by using automated stage lights on stands. He hoped to deviate from the creative process by which he created Lonerism, which he described as torturous, but ultimately found himself "falling down completely the same hole again" on Currents.

Recording the album soon became an obsession to Parker, as he worked "all day, every day," growing increasingly isolated. He said, "At some point, life outside the studio fades into the distance. That's how I know that I'm into it." He reasoned that any alternate approach would imply that the music was not powerful enough. Pitchfork writer Corban Goble described Parker's daily routine in an article shortly preceding the album's release: "During the making of an album, the 29-year-old generally likes to rise around midday and then work, slowly and methodically, late into the night while drinking and smoking." Parker contended this approach helped his writing, noting, "Things flow easier [after a few drinks] – the flow is the most important thing for me for recording." He also often went swimming during breaks, which he dubbed "the ultimate purifier." He followed a mantra of "give the song what it deserves," which entailed creating music without "any sensible or logical decisions." Parker recorded dozens of vocals takes; according to him, for one song, he performed over 1,056 partial vocal takes. For one week, he rented another house located four hours south of Perth—the same one where he recorded Innerspeaker—to brainstorm drum ideas for songs.

For Currents, Parker utilised the Roland Juno-106 and Sequential Circuits Pro-One synths that he had previously used on Lonerism, and also added a Roland JV-1080 synth module and a Sequential Circuits Drumtraks for electronic drums. The JV-1080 was used to record orchestral strings and brass sounds as well as choirs and chimes, and the album was recorded in Ableton Live with analogue summing equipment to add colour to the stereo bus. On "The Less I Know the Better" Parker used a Roland GR-55 guitar synth to record "every sound on the first two minutes of the song" using just a guitar with a MIDI pickup and his laptop.

The decision to exert control in every aspect of production aside from mastering came from obsession. He said, "I felt like, this way the album is even more my heart and soul, my blood, sweat, and tears." Parker set a deadline to complete the record because of his tendency to procrastinate; he described having a deadline as "a blessing in disguise because it forces you to make decisions there and then. Which in the end makes for good art." Currents was due to be completed in January 2015, but the deadline was pushed back several times. Late in the process, he became self-conscious about the honesty of his lyrics. He became obsessive about minor details in the work, making him unable to wholly enjoy it upon its completion. Shortly before its release, he said, "I still think this album is completely unlistenable."

== Composition ==
=== Music ===
Currents features styles of psychedelic pop, disco, R&B, and electropop, but the album's chord progressions and rhythms are most indebted to R&B. Kevin Parker listened to R&B from the 1990s during recording, which he had forced himself to reject while growing up due to peer pressures. He said, "Music guys aren't allowed to be into R&B when they are teenagers because all the teenybopper kids blast that shit in their cars." As such, learning to let go of preconceptions and embracing the music felt liberating to him. He had previously refrained from making his music more pop-oriented because he thought "indie-music snobs would turn their nose up at it," and he discovered that writing pure pop music was a challenge. Parker attributed his openness on Currents to producer Mark Ronson, whose album Uptown Special he collaborated on.

Many of the songs were composed over several years, both in the studio and on the road. Parker saved ideas using a voice recorder on his phone, and wrote many songs on a drum machine. Guitars are present in every song on Currents, but are used to accompany and answer other instruments. This was partially due to his gear being inaccessible: "We'd finish one tour in say, Europe, go home for two weeks, and all our gear, including my guitars and pedals, would be on their way to South America." He had a larger array of synthesizers at his home studio, which allowed them to become the prominent instrument. He said, "It's really just whatever is sitting around when I think of the song." The album incorporates Parker's falsetto, as well as a vocoder.

=== Lyrics ===
"Currents follows the progression of someone feeling like they are becoming something else. They're becoming the kind of person they thought they'd never become."

— Kevin Parker

The lyrical themes of Currents centre on personal transition and growing older. Parker's lyrics on the album are entirely autobiographical. His vocals are clearer and less affected than in prior Tame Impala releases, which is partially owed to him having more pride in his lyrics; he said he hoped it would be easy for listeners to understand them. Parker considered the primary theme of the album to be a "deep feeling of transition in your psyche," or, in a broad sense, fully entering adulthood. He began learning about the concept of the Saturn return halfway through the recording process, which explained his feelings of reflection. He said, "I was halfway through making the album when I heard about it, and it gave what I was doing a lot more meaning; suddenly things made a lot more sense." Accordingly, on the album his reaction to transition is acceptance, exemplified by the opening song, "Let It Happen". Parker also felt buying the home where he recorded Currents "really changed my perspective about where I saw myself, like a place that I belonged."

Currents has also been frequently characterised as a breakup album. Prior to recording, Parker made the decision to break up with French singer-songwriter Melody Prochet. Several songs on the album examine it from his angle as the instigator of the breakup, which consists of guilt and self-questioning. Parker downplayed the notion that the album was entirely aimed at former lovers, however, and likened it to an inner monologue: "It's really me talking to myself, another part of myself... to my old self, the part of me that resists change and wants me to stay as I am." For Parker, the album meant "looking forward and a sudden adoption of confidence." The album's title reflects this, with currents being "these unstoppable forces; the parts of you that are trying to change you."

=== Songs ===
"Let It Happen"
A section of "Let It Happen" appears to skip, becoming part of the song's beat.

"Let It Happen" opens the album, and is about "finding yourself always in this world of chaos and all this stuff going on around you and always shutting it out because you don't want to be part of it. But at some point, you realise it takes more energy to shut it out than it does to let it happen and be a part of 'it'." At one point, the song begins to skip, reminiscent of a skipping compact disc. Parker included this as an extension of his fascination with glitches in playback. "Nangs" has been noted for its interlude-like composition and its woozy, psychedelic sound. "Yes I'm Changing" is a song Parker claims he does not remember making: "A weird experience, because it was like it was someone else made the song. I had no memory of imagining it." "Eventually" concerns "knowing that you're about to damage someone almost irreparably, and the only consolation you get is this distant hope that they’ll be alright eventually, because you know they aren't going to be now or soon." Parker conceded that he "can't really deny" it is a breakup song.

Parker stated that "The Less I Know the Better" "shouldn't be on a Tame Impala album because it has this dorky, white disco funk." "'Cause I'm a Man" attracted controversy upon its release due to perceived sexism in its lyrics, but Parker meant the opposite: "The song is about how weak men are basically, and how we make all these excuses." "New Person, Same Old Mistakes" closes the record, and expresses self-doubt. Parker said, "The last song is meant to sound like the final battle between optimism and pessimism, a confrontation between the side of you that wants to progress and the side of you that wants to stay the same." Barbadian singer Rihanna covered the track for her eighth studio album Anti (2016) under the title "Same Ol' Mistakes". It consists of Tame Impala's instrumental, extended to a length of 6 minutes and 35 seconds, with Rihanna's vocal replacing Parker's.

== Release ==
The album's promotional cycle began when lead single "Let It Happen" was released as a free download on 10 March 2015. One day later, Parker was in New York for a mastering session with engineer Greg Calbi. The album was originally set to be released in May 2015, capitalizing on the group's appearance at Coachella. But as the album neared mastering, Parker was not yet done with lyrics for two songs. His perfectionism led to the album's release date being pushed back to July. In the interim, three more singles were released: "'Cause I'm a Man" and "Disciples" in April during a Reddit AMA, and "Eventually" in May. Due to the album's delay, Chris DeVille of Stereogum noted that "about a third of the record [had] gone public already" by the time it was released.

In October 2017, a "collector's edition" of Currents was announced. The release includes three B-sides and two remixes, and was released on 17 November.

== Packaging ==
The cover art for Currents and its accompanying singles was created by Kentucky-based artist and musician Robert Beatty. Parker has said Currents' designs are based on a diagram of vortex shedding he remembered while trying to visualise the album's themes. Beatty described how Parker's ideas for the album artwork "were all based on turbulent flow, the way liquid or air flows around objects." Beatty referenced the works of Franco Grignani, Zdeněk Ziegler, and Karel Vaca when creating the cover art.

== Critical reception ==
Professional ratings
Aggregate scores
Source	Rating
AnyDecentMusic?	7.9/10
Metacritic	84/100
Review scores
Source	Rating
AllMusic	3/5 stars
Entertainment Weekly	A−
The Guardian	5/5 stars
The Independent	3/5 stars
NME	8/10
Paste	9.4/10
Pitchfork	9.3/10
Q	4/5 stars
Rolling Stone Australia	4/5 stars
Spin	9/10

Currents received widespread acclaim from music critics. On Metacritic, the album holds an average critic score of 84, based on 38 critics, indicating "universal acclaim". Ian Cohen of Pitchfork gave the album a "Best New Music" designation, saying, "Nearly every proper song on Currents is a revelatory statement of Parker's range and increasing expertise as a producer, arranger, songwriter, and vocalist while maintaining the essence of Tame Impala". Cohen compared the record to others such as Loveless, Kid A, and Yankee Hotel Foxtrot, writing, "it's the result of a supernaturally talented obsessive trying to perfect music while redefining their relationship to album-oriented rock." Spin's Harley Brown called it "the purest – and most complex – distillation of everything that makes the band such a nearly physical pleasure to listen to". Brown added, "The real magic of Currents, though, is in how Parker so effectively (and genuinely, for the most part) manipulates the listener's emotions without necessarily revealing any himself." Alex Denney of NME praised Parker for his musical transition, writing, "Fuzzed-out guitars simply aren't where Parker's head is at now, which strikes us as a fair trade-off from a producer pushing at the outer reaches of his talent."

Alexis Petridis of The Guardian wrote "A lot of the album's power and strangeness comes from the way [the lyrics] cut against the lusciousness of the arrangements... and the loveliness of the melodies." He praised Parker for creating psychedelia by leaving the listener "simultaneously baffled and intrigued", rather than resorting to clichéd psychedelic music effects. Darren Levin of Rolling Stone Australia said "the first thing that really strikes you about Currents is how hi-fi it actually is", and that after listening to the opening track, "you really do get the feeling you're watching one of rock's most restlessly creative minds at work". He concluded his review, "For someone who once sang 'Feels like we only go backwards', moving forward seems like Kevin Parker's only preoccupation right now." Levin was one of many reviewers to compare the album to Daft Punk's 2013 record Random Access Memories. Jon Pareles of The New York Times said that like their first two albums, "The core of Tame Impala is its aura of solitude". He called Currents "a tour de force for the songwriter and his gizmos. But it's also decidedly hermetic, nearly airless." Andy Gill of The Independent said, "while copious application of phasing offers a link to Tame Impala's psychedelic roots, the absence of guitar wig-outs may disappoint some fans".

=== Accolades ===
Currents appeared on several critics' lists of the best albums of 2015. Q named Currents the year's top album, saying that "Parker added dancefloor pop to their kaleidoscopic sound" while calling it "sonically advanced and filled with great songs". Spin ranked it as the year's fourth-best, calling it the group's "best because its soul actually lies in Motown". The magazine said the album finds Parker "coming to the epiphany that no amount of pitch- and time-shifting will screw with your perception of reality as much as a lyric that's as direct and true as 'They say people never change but that's bullshit / They do.'" Mojo also ranked the record as fourth-best of the year. Pitchfork ranked the album as the year's fifth-best, saying, "There's still a bit of Parker's elegant guitar here, but he's mostly rerouted his perfectionistic craftsmanship to synthesizer tones and drum programming." Paste ranked Currents at number eight on its list of the year's best albums, calling it a "near-perfect album" and "a superb progression from their last efforts, a study in internal consistency." Rolling Stone placed the album at number 13 on its list of the "50 Best Albums of 2015", writing that Parker's "musical rethink... is expansive, resulting in wide-screen adventures like 'Let It Happen'" and that the record is "full of weightless vocals and synthesized funk, for a set that's both blissed-out and mournful, like a set of diary entries from an astronaut floating off into oblivion". The album was also ranked fifth-best of the year by Consequence of Sound and NME, 15th-best by Stereogum, and 22nd-best by PopMatters, while Exclaim! named it the eighth-best pop/rock album of the year.

At the 2015 ARIA Music Awards, Currents was awarded Best Rock Album and Album of the Year, and "Let It Happen" was nominated for Best Pop Release. At the same event, Parker won for Engineer of the Year and Producer of the Year for his work on Currents, and Tame Impala were named Best Group. The album was nominated for Best Alternative Music Album at the 58th Annual Grammy Awards.

In 2020, Rolling Stone ranked Currents 382nd on its list of "The 500 Greatest Albums of All Time".

In 2023, writer Andrew McMillen of The Australian included the album in a list of albums that he considers "flawless" from recent decades. He wrote that Parker "let go of his classic rock roots to explore alternative dance and electronica, and the results were spectacular".

== Commercial performance ==
Currents debuted at number one in Australia, the group's first album to top the charts in their native country. It debuted at number three in the United Kingdom, becoming Tame Impala's first top-ten album in the country. In the United States, the album debuted at number four on the Billboard 200, moving 50,000 "equivalent album units" in its first week, 45,000 of which were sales; it was the group's first top-ten entry on the chart. The record debuted well on other Billboard charts, entering the Alternative Albums chart and Vinyl Albums chart at number one, and the Top Rock Albums chart at number two; first-week sales of vinyl copies in the US totaled 14,000, the highest for any album in a single week in the US since Jack White's Lazaretto more than a year prior. As of December 2015, 120,000 copies of Currents have sold in North America. In September 2015, the UK's Official Charts Company announced the creation of a new monthly chart called the Official Progressive Albums Chart, and that Currents would be its first number-one album.

== Track listing ==
All tracks are written by Kevin Parker.

Currents track listing
No.	Title	Length
1.	"Let It Happen"	7:47
2.	"Nangs"	1:47
3.	"The Moment"	4:15
4.	"Yes I'm Changing"	4:30
5.	"Eventually"	5:18
6.	"Gossip"	0:55
7.	"The Less I Know the Better"	3:36
8.	"Past Life"	3:48
9.	"Disciples"	1:48
10.	"'Cause I'm a Man"	4:01
11.	"Reality in Motion"	4:12
12.	"Love/Paranoia"	3:05
13.	"New Person, Same Old Mistakes"	6:03
Total length:		51:05

Japan bonus disc: Live Versions
No.	Title	Length
1.	"Endors Toi"	5:57
2.	"Why Won't You Make Up Your Mind?"	4:22
3.	"Sestri Levante"	1:58
4.	"Mind Mischief"	3:56
5.	"Desire Be, Desire Go"	5:24
6.	"Half Full Glass of Wine"	8:14
7.	"Be Above It"	7:29
8.	"Feels Like We Only Go Backwards"	2:56
9.	"Apocalypse Dreams" (Parker, Jay Watson)	7:56
Total length:		48:08

2017 collector's edition bonus vinyl / B-Sides & Remixes EP
No.	Title	Length
1.	"List of People (To Try and Forget About)"	4:40
2.	"Powerlines"	4:19
3.	"Taxi's Here"	4:48
4.	"Reality in Motion" (Gum remix)	5:04
5.	"Let It Happen" (Soulwax remix)	9:18
Total length:		28:06

== Personnel ==
Tame Impala

- Kevin Parker – songwriting, performance, production, recording, mixing, cover concept

Technical

- Rob Grant – additional recording, mix advice
- Greg Calbi – mastering

Artwork

- Robert Beatty – artwork and design
- Matthew C. Saville – photography

== Charts ==
=== Weekly charts ===
2015 weekly chart performance for Currents
Chart (2015)	Peak position
Australian Albums (ARIA)	1
Austrian Albums (Ö3 Austria)	30
Belgian Albums (Ultratop Flanders)	9
Belgian Albums (Ultratop Wallonia)	14
Canadian Albums (Billboard)	2
Danish Albums (Hitlisten)	28
Dutch Albums (Album Top 100)	1
French Albums (SNEP)	16
German Albums (Offizielle Top 100)	25
Irish Albums (IRMA)	7
Italian Albums (FIMI)	31
Japanese Albums (Oricon)	71
New Zealand Albums (RMNZ)	7
Norwegian Albums (VG-lista)	11
Portuguese Albums (AFP)	4
Scottish Albums (Official Charts)	5
Spanish Albums (Promusicae)	8
Swedish Albums (Sverigetopplistan)	34
Swiss Albums (Schweizer Hitparade)	11
UK Albums (Official Charts)	3
US Billboard 200	4
US Top Alternative Albums (Billboard)	1
US Top Rock Albums (Billboard)	2
US Indie Store Album Sales (Billboard)	1

2022 weekly chart performance for Currents
Chart (2022)	Peak position
Greek Albums (IFPI)	1
Lithuanian Albums (AGATA)	36

2025–2026 weekly chart performance for Currents
Chart (2025–2026)	Peak position
Hungarian Physical Albums (MAHASZ)	32
Icelandic Albums (Tónlistinn)	35
Polish Albums (ZPAV)	48
Portuguese Albums (AFP)	12
Swedish Albums (Sverigetopplistan)	22

=== Year-end charts ===
2015 year-end chart performance for Currents
Chart (2015)	Position
Australian Albums (ARIA)	28
Belgian Albums (Ultratop Flanders)	54
Dutch Albums (Album Top 100)	68
US Top Alternative Albums (Billboard)	35
US Top Rock Albums (Billboard)	47

2016 year-end chart performance for Currents
Chart (2016)	Position
Australian Albums (ARIA)	69
Belgian Albums (Ultratop Flanders)	29
Belgian Albums (Ultratop Wallonia)	126
Dutch Albums (Album Top 100)	77
US Top Rock Albums (Billboard)	74

2017 year-end chart performance for Currents
Chart (2017)	Position
Australian Artist Albums (ARIA)	35

2018 year-end chart performance for Currents
Chart (2018)	Position
Australian Artist Albums (ARIA)	48

2019 year-end chart performance for Currents
Chart (2019)	Position
Australian Artist Albums (ARIA)	35
US Top Alternative Albums (Billboard)	24
US Top Rock Albums (Billboard)	55

2020 year-end chart performance for Currents
Chart (2020)	Position
Australian Albums (ARIA)	91
Icelandic Albums (Tónlistinn)	86
US Top Alternative Albums (Billboard)	12
US Top Rock Albums (Billboard)	23

2021 year-end chart performance for Currents
Chart (2021)	Position
US Top Alternative Albums (Billboard)	30
US Top Rock Albums (Billboard)	46

2022 year-end chart performance for Currents
Chart (2022)	Position
Australian Albums (ARIA)	74
Belgian Albums (Ultratop Flanders)	121
Dutch Albums (Album Top 100)	94
Icelandic Albums (Tónlistinn)	42
Lithuanian Albums (AGATA)	55
US Billboard 200	138
US Top Alternative Albums (Billboard)	14
US Top Rock Albums (Billboard)	25

2023 year-end chart performance for Currents
Chart (2023)	Position
Australian Albums (ARIA)	76
Belgian Albums (Ultratop Flanders)	102
Dutch Albums (Album Top 100)	90
Icelandic Albums (Tónlistinn)	42
US Billboard 200	123
US Top Alternative Albums (Billboard)	13
US Top Rock Albums (Billboard)	19

2024 year-end chart performance for Currents
Chart (2024)	Position
Australian Vinyl Albums (ARIA)	20
Belgian Albums (Ultratop Flanders)	132
Dutch Albums (Album Top 100)	84
Icelandic Albums (Tónlistinn)	65
US Billboard 200	148

2025 year-end chart performance for Currents
Chart (2025)	Position
Australian Artist Albums (ARIA)	25
Belgian Albums (Ultratop Flanders)	76
Belgian Albums (Ultratop Wallonia)	190
Dutch Albums (Album Top 100)	42
Icelandic Albums (Tónlistinn)	44

== Certifications and sales ==
Region	Certification	Certified units/sales
Australia (ARIA)	Platinum	70,000^{^}
Canada (Music Canada)	Gold	40,000^{‡}
Denmark (IFPI Danmark)	2× Platinum	40,000^{‡}
France (SNEP)	Gold	50,000^{‡}
Germany (BVMI)	Gold	100,000^{‡}
Iceland (FHF)	—	3,316
Italy (FIMI)	Platinum	50,000^{‡}
Netherlands (NVPI)	Gold	20,000^{‡}
New Zealand (RMNZ)	4× Platinum	60,000^{‡}
Poland (ZPAV)	Platinum	20,000^{‡}
United Kingdom (BPI)	Platinum	300,000^{‡}
United States (RIAA)	Platinum	1,000,000^{‡}
^{^} Shipments figures based on certification alone.^{‡} Sales+streaming figures based on certification alone.
