= Disciples (song) =

Promotional single by Tame Impala

from the album Currents
- Released: 30 April 2015
- Recorded: 2012–2015
- Studio: Kevin Parker's home studio, Fremantle, Western Australia
- Genre: Psychedelic pop; dream pop; garage rock
- Length: 1:48
- Label: Modular; Fiction; Interscope
- Songwriter(s): Kevin Parker
- Producer(s): Parker

Tame Impala promo singles chronology
"Apocalypse Dreams" (2012)	"Disciples" (2015)

"Disciples" is a song by Australian psychedelic music project Tame Impala, first released on 30 April 2015 as a promotional single for their third studio album Currents, being the third track to be released in promotion of the record.

== Background ==
On April 29, 2015, the sole member of Tame Impala Kevin Parker did an "Ask me Anything" on Reddit, somebody asked him what questions he wanted, in which he responded that he was waiting for someone to ask him to hear a new song. Following this, and people asking to hear a new song, he posted the link for "Disciples", with it being officially released as a promotional single the next day. Other questions throughout the AMA included his favorite albums, what albums he liked to busy to, whether music will be free in the future, his opinion on American-rapper Kanye West, and the time Sean Lennon told Parker he sounded just like his father, John Lennon.

== Reception and composition ==
According to DIY, the track is the most "direct" of the singles released up that point, being "Let It Happen" and "'Cause I'm a Man", also noting how it is "filtered through a hazy aesthetic".

Bill Pearis of BrooklynVegan enjoyed the track, calling the track a very catchy, but little pop song.

Caesar Fajriansah, writing for indieaccent also enjoyed the track, describing it as deceptively optimistic and giving a "special kind of warmth run through my body whenever I hear those beautifully dreamy synthesizer and Kevin Parker's voice", overall wishing it was longer than it is.

Writing for Vice, Eric Sundermann simply stated that the track was blissful and kicked ass, enjoying the track.

In a short review about the release of the track, Beat Magazine called it an excellent lo-fi into hi-fi pop ditty. Another short review by Exclaim! called the track a slice of summery, sugary psychedelic pop.

Jess Marshalek of mxdwn called the track the most catchy of the ones released up to that point, stating that it will get you to "nod your head or tap your foot to the beat", having a psychedelic vibe, and featuring a prominent bass and drum line.

== Personnel ==
Tame Impala

- Kevin Parker – songwriting, performance, production, recording, mixing, cover concept

Technical

- Rob Grant – additional recording, mix advice
- Greg Calbi – mastering

== Certifications ==
Region	Certification	Certified units/sales
United States (RIAA)	Gold	500,000^{‡}
^{‡} Sales+streaming figures based on certification alone.
