= Live Versions =

Live album by Tame Impala
- Released: 19 April 2014
- Recorded: 10 October 2013
- Venue: Riviera Theatre, Chicago, Illinois, United States
- Genre: Psychedelic rock
- Length: 48:08
- Label: Modular

Tame Impala chronology
| Lonerism (2012) | Live Versions (2014) | Currents (2015) |

Live Versions is the first live album by the Australian psychedelic rock band Tame Impala, released on 19 April 2014 (Record Store Day) by Modular Recordings.

== Track listing ==
All songs written by Kevin Parker, except "Apocalypse Dreams", written by Kevin Parker and Jay Watson.

Live Versions
| No. | Title | Original album | Length |
|---|---|---|---|
| 1. | "Endors Toi" | Lonerism | 5:57 |
| 2. | "Why Won't You Make Up Your Mind?" | Innerspeaker | 4:22 |
| 3. | "Sestri Levante" | | 1:58 |
| 4. | "Mind Mischief" | Lonerism | 3:56 |
| 5. | "Desire Be, Desire Go" | Innerspeaker | 5:24 |
| 6. | "Half Full Glass of Wine" | Tame Impala | 8:14 |
| 7. | "Be Above It" | Lonerism | 7:29 |
| 8. | "Feels Like We Only Go Backwards" | Lonerism | 2:56 |
| 9. | "Apocalypse Dreams" | Lonerism | 7:56 |
| Total length: | | | 48:08 |

== Personnel ==
- Kevin Parker – vocals, guitar
- Jay Watson – keys, synth, backing vocals
- Dominic Simper – guitar, keys
- Cam Avery – bass
- Julien Barbagallo – drums
