= South Fremantle (disambiguation) =

South Fremantle might refer to:

- South Fremantle, Western Australia, a suburb of Perth
- Electoral district of South Fremantle, an electoral district of the Western Australian Legislative Assembly that existed between 1890 and 1962
- South Fremantle Football Club
- South Fremantle Power Station
