= Skip (audio playback) =

A skip occurs when a phonograph (gramophone), cassette tape or compact disc player malfunctions or is disturbed so as to play incorrectly, causing a break in sound or a jump to another part of the recording.

== Vinyl gramophone records ==
Vinyl records are easily scratched and vinyl readily acquires a static charge, attracting dust that is difficult to remove completely. Dust and scratches cause audio clicks and pops and, in extreme cases, they can cause the needle (stylus) to skip over a series of grooves, or worse yet, cause the needle to skip backwards, creating an unintentional locked groove that repeats the same 1.8 seconds (at 33⅓ RPM) or 1.3 seconds (at 45 RPM) of track over and over again. Locked grooves are not uncommon and are even heard occasionally in broadcasts. The locked groove gave rise to the expression broken record referring to someone who continually repeats the same statement with little if any variation.

== Compact discs ==
A skip or jump is when the laser of a CD player cannot read the faulty groove or block of data. Skips are usually caused by marks blocking the path of the beam to the disc, e.g., a finger mark, hair, dirt in general, or a scratch. Since the read mechanism has very little contact with the disc's surface and the data itself is not on the outer layer of the disc, the blockage is not a physical issue as with a record, but rather reflective.

=== Basic players ===
Early CD players were very basic in nature. A laser tracks the blocks of data from the centre of the disc outwards, while the disc itself revolves at a variable speed between a starting speed of 495 RPM, and a minimum finishing speed of 212 RPM. Generally, one cycle constitutes one block of data. If there is a faulty block of data, the player may do one of the following:

1. Repeat the previous block of audio
2. Skip the faulty block
3. Try and retry to read it, causing a stopping and starting of the music

A player may utilise one or more of these techniques, depending on how faulty the data is. In the case of severe, irrecoverable damage to the data, the player may try to rescan the disc to relocate its position. In this case, the machine may make a series of audible chirping noises as the laser is moving from the faulty block to the data information area and back again.

=== Later players ===
When CD players began their induction into battery-powered portable machines and vehicles, a skip could happen even for simple movement such as walking, vehicles jerking etc. Therefore a strategy was needed to try to prevent this. When certain techniques were tested and failed, the most successful and popular method to date was to spin the disc faster in order to read a chunk of the data into memory while playing. This meant that the player itself could concentrate on reading while the software controlling the buffers and memory distribution could also act as the audio feed. In the case of a minor error, the disc's rotation would again speed up to facilitate several attempts to read the data. A technique was also developed for testing data to prevent severe skipping. These two techniques were largely successful, unless of course the data was damaged beyond repair, in which case the audio may stop, or skip as before.

=== CD-ROM drives ===
In a computer, a CD-ROM drive is governed by the program controlling it. In most cases, the BIOS has rudimentary access to the drive for boot purposes, while operating systems usually come bundled with their own drivers. The drive itself has very little instruction, apart from direct instructions, such as spin up, read data, etc.

When playing a CD in the computer, the media player of choice is giving instructions to the CD drive, whether through the operating system's drivers or by accessing the device's low-level interface itself. Usually, similar to modern players, the media player will be reading audio into memory for later playback, especially given the extreme speeds used by CD-ROM drives in order to access raw data on other discs. Because of this, if there is a fault during playback, the player will already be performing a checksum to verify the data read is correct. If it is wrong, the audio is usually stopped, depending on the player.

== Cassette tapes ==
Cassette tape players can cause skips when the tape being played is worn or in some other way damaged. Since the tape is rolled into a reel, it depends on how the tape runs across the roll as to how the skip affects playback. Indeed, some early artists, such as the Beatles, deliberately rearranged the tape reels in order to produce loops used in their recordings.

== Computer audio ==
Electronic media on a computer can often skip. Such media may include compressed and uncompressed audio, and video containing audio. Generally, this cannot happen to music instructive files such as MIDI or MOD files, however, depending on the circumstance, single notes may become jammed, when the note-off message is not received by the playback device.

Computer skips can be caused by a lack of available RAM or processing power, damaged storage mediums (CD, hard drive etc.), a crash in the playback software, or a corrupted, incomplete or damaged audio file. Depending on the player and the operating system, a skip usually consists of a 50MS, 300MS, 500MS or a one-second loop, depending on the size or length of the chunk of data that is currently loaded into memory.

== Skipping as a musical component ==
Compact Disc skipping is prevalent in glitch music. The second half of the song, Let It Happen, on Tame Impala's third album Currents begins with a section that repeats itself like a CD scratch, which then slowly transitions into the rest of the second half. The producer, Kevin Parker, included this as he is fascinated with glitches in playback.

== See also ==
- Gramophone record limitations
- Wow (recording)
- Electronic skip protection
- Optical media preservation
