= Eventually (Tame Impala song) =

Single by Tame Impala

from the album Currents
- Released: 15 June 2015
- Recorded: Kevin Parker's home studio (Fremantle, Western Australia)
- Genre: Psychedelic rock; synth-pop; psychedelic pop
- Length: 5:19
- Label: Modular; Interscope
- Songwriter: Kevin Parker
- Producer: Kevin Parker

Tame Impala singles chronology
"'Cause I'm a Man" (2015)	"Eventually" (2015)	"The Less I Know the Better" (2015)

"Eventually" is a song by Australian psychedelic music project Tame Impala. It is the fifth track on the 2015 album Currents, and was originally released as a promotional single on 8 May 2015, alongside the announcement of the album. A radio edit was serviced radio in June 2015 as the third single from the album. "Eventually" was certified gold in Australia in 2020.

In April 2015, Parker told Under the Radar the song is about "knowing that you're about to damage someone almost irreparably, and the only consolation you get is this distant hope that they’ll be alright eventually, because you know they aren't going to be now or soon."

The song was shortlisted for Song of the Year at the APRA Music Awards of 2016.

== Plagiarism claim ==
In August 2015, Sam Culley, a member of the '70s funk group Skull Snaps claimed Parker sampled the band's song "It's a New Day" on "Eventually".

== Certifications ==
Region	Certification	Certified units/sales
Australia (ARIA)	2× Platinum	140,000^{‡}
New Zealand (RMNZ)	Platinum	30,000^{‡}
United Kingdom (BPI)	Gold	400,000^{‡}
United States (RIAA)	Platinum	1,000,000^{‡}
^{‡} Sales+streaming figures based on certification alone.

== Release history ==
Region	Date	Label	Format	Version
Various	8 May 2015	Modular	Digital download	Album version
Australia	June 2015	Modular	radio	Radio edit

== Covers ==
"Eventually" was covered by the indie pop band Lucius on their 2018 compilation album Nudes.
