= Apocalypse Dreams =

2012 song by Tame Impala

Promotional single by Tame Impala

from the album Lonerism
- Released: 8 July 2012
- Recorded: 2010–2012
- Studio: Kevin Parker's home studios in Perth and Paris
- Genre: Psychedelic rock; psychedelic pop
- Length: 5:56
- Label: Modular
- Songwriters: Parker; Jay Watson
- Producers: Parker; David Fridmann

Tame Impala promo singles chronology
"Apocalypse Dreams" (2012)	"Disciples" (2015)

"Apocalypse Dreams" is a song by Australian psychedelic rock artist Tame Impala. It was first released on July 8, 2012 as a promo single and first track released in promotion of the band's second studio album Lonerism as the third track.

It is the first track by the band to have a songwriting credit besides frontman Kevin Parker, being co-written by touring drummer Jay Watson.

== Background and release ==
According to Studio Rumblings, Kevin Parker recorded the track after watching the 2011 film Melancholia. In a statement about the track, Parker stated that "I think the first guitar comes three minutes in. Co-writing was... whoa... a huge thing for me, so that's a Parker/Watson number, and the rest is the usual story: me locked away."

The track was first premiered by Triple J Radio on 8 July 2012, immediately following the premier the track was made available to download for free on the artist’s website.

== Reception ==
Writing for Pitchfork upon the tracks original release, Larry Fitzmaurice praised the track, stating that it is proof the band hadn't lost their talent yet. They described the track as an "expansive psych epic" that finds "Parker building up and breaking down a pule day-glo melodies before just letting the whole thing run free during the song's closing minutes." Overall, describing the track as a "trip worth taking". Noisey Staff of Vice stated that the track "is an anthemic, piano-bashing soundtrack to skipping across a rolling countryside".

In a ranking of the top 40 Tame Impala tracks by Christie Eleizer of Tone Deaf, "Apocalypse Dreams" ranked number 17. They called the track a "cracker song", moreover, calling it "the type you’d turn up in the car or train, and be impressed by the depth in the deft instrumental and production touches". KCRW's review of the track states that "starts off like a classic Motown chugger and then turns into a stunningly woozy and inspired existential trip that recalls The Flaming Lips at their The Soft Bulletin finest." Overall, stating that it's "fantastic and hopefully a solid indicator of the fact that Tame Impala's new record is going to be anexcellent follow-up to their indelible debut. If only all dreams could be this apocalyptic."

Steven Moore of The A.V. Club described the track finding Parker in an existential crisis, "wondering how a changing world could impact an unwelcomed loner", Jim Carroll of The Irish Times believed that Parker sounded "a hell of a lot like John Lennon", along with "Why Won't They Talk to Me". In another Pitchfork review, Ian Cohen stated that Parker and co-producer Dave Fridmann "take control of the mixing consoles and shake the whole thing up like a snowglobe", furthermore, stating that the track build on the momentum of a "bouncy northern soul groove up to a peak before the mix abruptly cuts off and spits them back into a panoramic, HD jam". Brendan Frank of Beats Per Minute believed that the track picked up right where Tame Impala's previous album InnerSpeaker left off. Furthermore, stating that the track delivers "more echo-clasped guitar lines and pensive psychedelia". They described the track as being deeper, darker, and having breakdowns that "never distract from singer and group architect Kevin Parker’s greatest gift: melody", having "nightmarish synths" curling around "the sun-baked scuzz", adding "new hiccups and alterations to their old school sound."

Barry Walters of Spin stated that "true to his outsider identity, Parker is clearly already rebelling against the expectations that come with winning Album of the Year honors in Australia’s Rolling Stone" by sticking "bubblegum" piano riffs into the track while "hitting notes higher than those even Spears and Minogue can achieve." Writing for HuffPost, Andres Jauregui stated that "if Tame Impala were from Brooklyn, then one might unflinchingly say that their new song, "Apocalypse Dreams," which the band shared today, sounds like if the Beatles were from Bushwick, circa summer 2009." Additionally, stating that if you can "vibe on its airy waves of crashing fuzz-phase-reverb, rollicking drums and fab faux vocals, you might have gotten kaleidoscope-eyed at many a Market Hotel show."

== Personnel ==
Tame Impala

- Kevin Parker – production, recording; all vocals and instruments; cover photo

Additional musicians

- Jay Watson – writer, piano, keyboard

Production

- Dave Fridmann – mixing
- Greg Calbi – mastering
- Leif Podhajsky – artwork and layout
- Matthew C. Saville – studio photography
