= Karel Vaca =

Czech painter and graphic artist (1919–1989)

- Born: 21 July 1919; Prostějov, Czechoslovakia
- Died: 31 March 1989 (aged 69); Prague, Czechoslovakia
- Education: Academy of Arts, Architecture and Design in Prague
- Style: Abstraction, Cubism

Signature
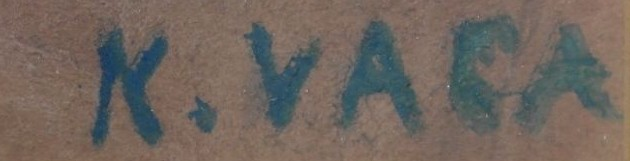

Karel Vaca (21 July 1919 – 31 March 1989) was a Czechoslovak painter, graphic artist, illustrator and designer.

== Life ==
Vaca was born on 21 July 1919 in Prostějov, Czechoslovakia.

From 1937 to 1938, Vaca studied at the Rotter School of Advertising in Prague. He later studied at the Academy of Arts, Architecture and Design in Prague from 1945 to 1950. From 1948 to 1988, he worked with several theatres, including the National Theatre in Prague, the National Theatre in Brno, and the ABC Theatre. After 1950, he worked freelance. His first solo exhibition was in 1958 in Prostějov. Beginning in 1959, he worked with the art group Trasa. After 1960, he began painting regularly.

Vaca died on 31 March 1989 in Prague.

Vaca created 341 posters (305 of which are for films, the rest for theatre) and participated in 260 collective exhibitions.

Vaca's works have been shown in the Museum of Modern Art (New York City), the Museum of Design (Zurich), the Tokyo Metropolitan Art Museum (Tokyo), and Trade Fair Palace (Prague), among others.

== Awards ==
Year	Received from	Placement	Film poster	Ref.
1964	Karlovy Vary international film festival	Second prize	The Sweet Life and Accused	
1977	The Hollywood Reporter	Special prize	The White Odyssey	
1980	Chicago International Film Festival	Grand prize	National Class Category Up to 785 ccm	
1982	The Hollywood Reporter	Third prize	Don't Call Me Major!	
1984	Chicago International Film Festival	Second prize	For 200 Grand, You Get Nothing Now	
1988		Best Poster of the Year Honorable mention	The Great Film Robbery	
