= South Fremantle Power Station =

Former power station in Western Australia

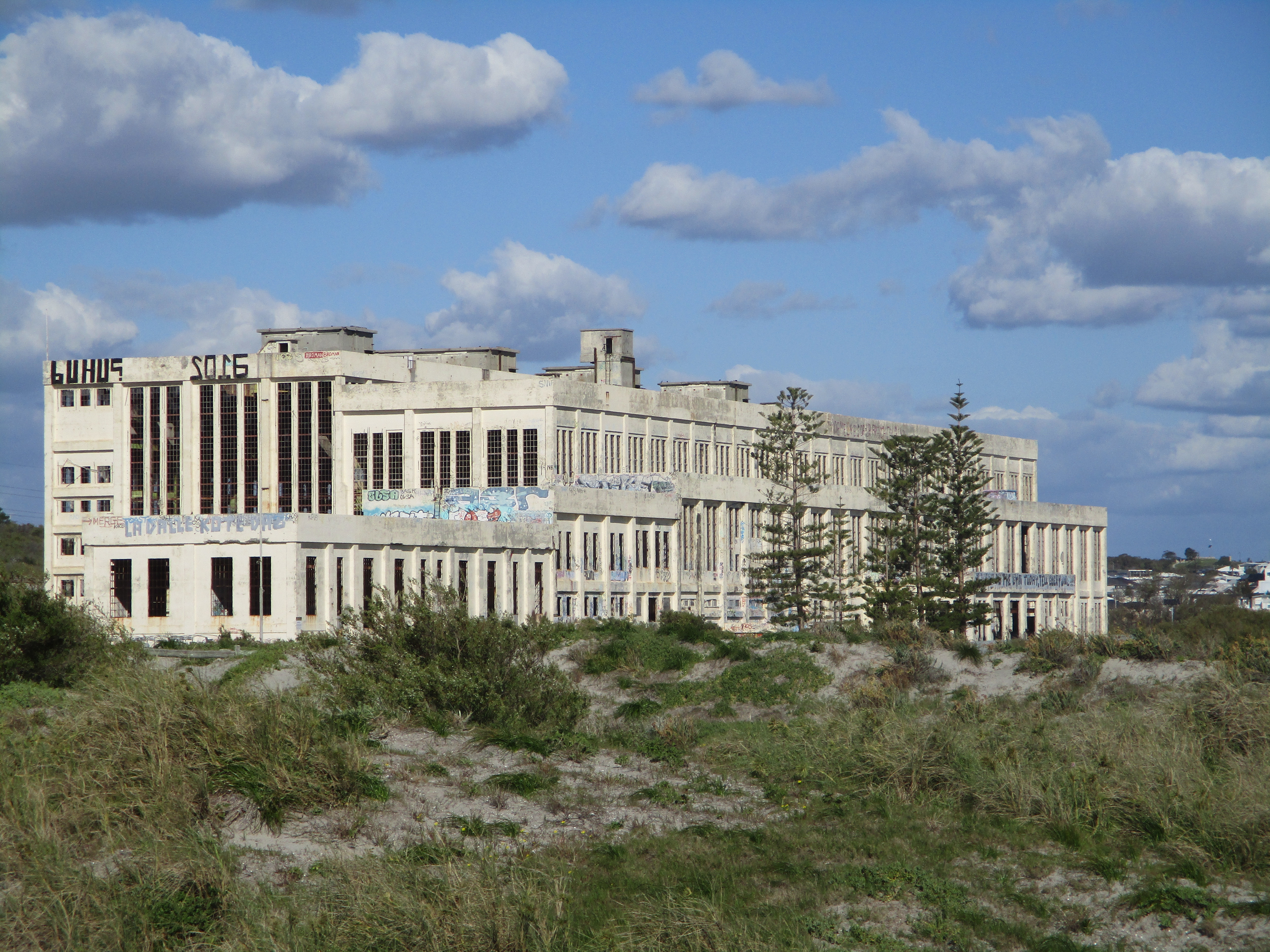
- The South Fremantle Power Station in 2019
- Interactive map of the South Fremantle Power Station area

General information
- Type: Power Station
- Location: North Coogee, Western Australia
- Coordinates: 32.094167°S 115.759167°E
- Construction started: 1946
- Completed: 1951
- Closed: 1985

Western Australia Heritage Register
- Official name: South Fremantle Power Station
- Type: State Registered Place
- Designated: 8 June 2021
- Reference no.: 3381

The South Fremantle Power Station is a former oil- and coal-fired power station located in North Coogee, Western Australia. The now disused building is listed on the Western Australian State Register of Heritage Places. The building is of Art Deco industrial design. It was the first major power generating equipment in Western Australia designed to operate on 50 Hz.

== Background ==
Power generation in Perth throughout the 1940s relied heavily on the sole 25-megawatt generator of the East Perth Power Station, backed up by a number of older, smaller and less efficient generators. Consequently, power cuts were frequent in the city throughout this era. As a further consequence, new electrical products were only very slowly introduced in the state and take up of those by the general public was slow as the unreliable power supply meant these could not be used reliably.

At this point, Perth's electricity network operated at 40 Hz but, in 1943 the recommendation was made in the Standardisation of Electricity Supply in Western Australia - 1943 report to upgrade this to 50 Hz. At the recommendation of Russell Dumas of the Public Works Department, a 25 MW at 50 Hz generator was purchased for the future South Fremantle Power Station in 1945.

Conversion of the network as well as consumer appliances to 50 Hz came at considerable cost, which the Western Australian Government agreed to contribute to.

== History ==
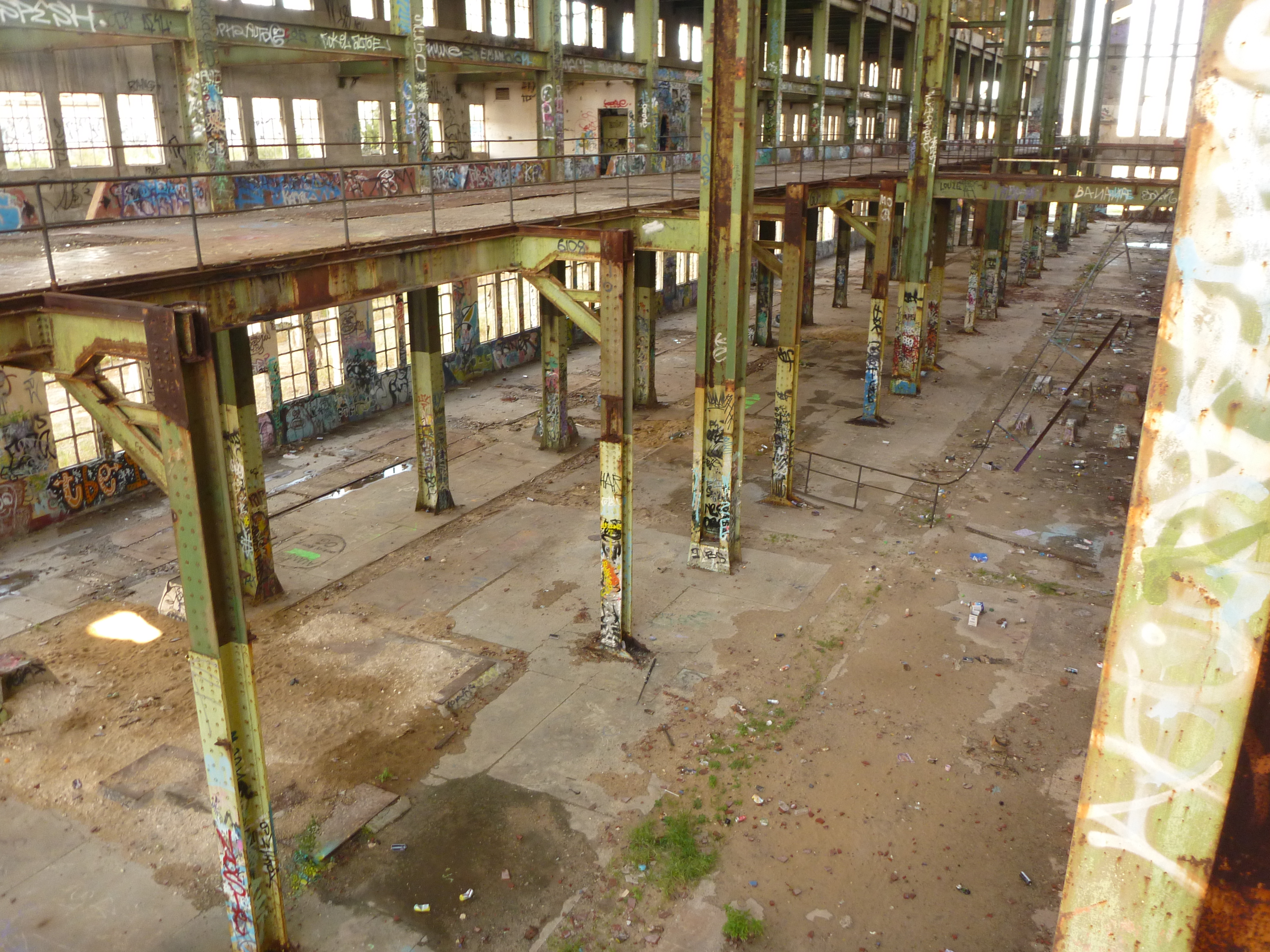
The eastern hall of the power station

Selection of the South Fremantle site for the future power station was based on a number of factors, among them the access to an existing railway line for coal deliveries, access to seawater for cooling purposes and proximity to a population centre. Planning for the new power station commenced in 1943 but construction only began after the Second World War, in January 1946.

Construction was slow and took six years to complete because of a shortage of materials like concrete, pipes and valves and, in some cases, alternative materials had to be found. In January 1951 the four boilers of Station A were first fired up, in May the alternator came online, and on 27 June 1951 the Minister for Electricity, David Brand, officially opened the power station. Most of the equipment for the power station had been sourced from the United Kingdom.

Power generation was achieved by coal heating steam, which in turn spun two turbines that rotated the two 25 MW generators to create electricity, with the second generator coming online in September 1951. Two more generators came online in 1954, raising power generation at South Fremantle to 100 MW. To operate in conjunction with the 40 Hz East Perth Power Station, a frequency changer was necessary at East Perth until 1960, when the conversion of the network to 50 Hz had been completed.

Coinciding with the opening of South Fremantle Power Station was a drastic rise in power consumption Perth. Just before the opening, only 50 percent of homes in Perth required any conversion work to 50 Hz, but this number had risen to 94 percent by 1956.

The power station suffered structural damage in a fire on the coal conveyor in 1954, an event that prompted conversion from coal to an oil-fired power station. This change was reverted again in the 1970s, when it became coal-fired once more until closure in 1985. The rising oil price of the early 1970s forced the return to coal but this caused concern about emissions as environmental awareness had increased. The smoke emissions at East Perth and South Fremantle had to meet new environmental standards by 1977.

With the expansion of the Muja Power Station at Collie, both East Perth and South Fremantle Power Stations became uneconomical to operate, with the former closed in 1981 and the latter in 1985.

From 1994 to 1997, equipment was removed from the plant and some of the facilities demolished. All asbestos was removed from site for future development but the facility continues to remain empty.

== Architectural style ==
The South Fremantle Power Station was one of only two power stations in Western Australia to be constructed as a steel and concrete structure, with extensive glazing.

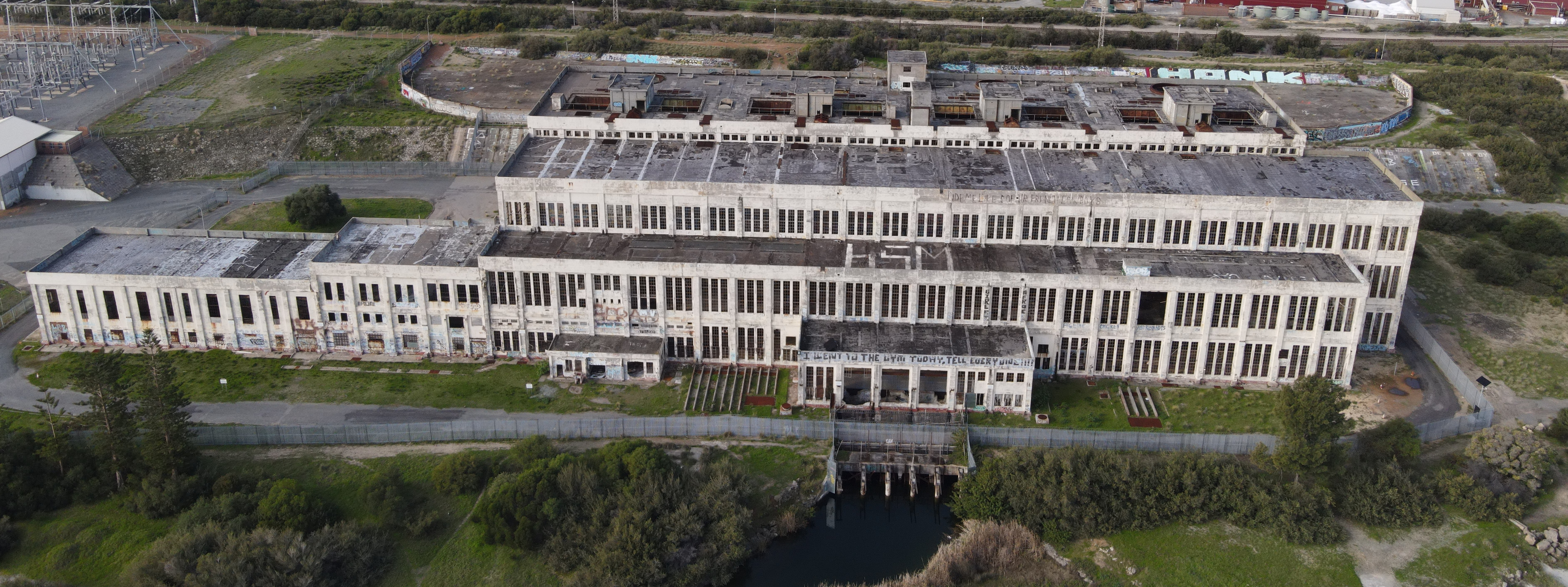
West side of the South Fremantle Power Station in 2024

The building's style was influenced by Art Deco, Inter War Functionalist and Stripped Classical architecture, of which it is the largest example in Western Australia.

== Popular culture ==
Tame Impala's album Currents is inspired in title and lyrically by Kevin Parker's time spent at the power station, with Parker dedicating a section in the collector's edition release of the album to the station and the impact of his experiences there on him and the album. "A lot of the songs on Currents have passages that were directly inspired by the power house and doing laps of it. It is scary and confronting, but such a beautiful thing. So much of Currents was mentally conceived between here and the power station all along the coast".

== Condition ==
Since its closure, the derelict industrial building has achieved iconic status and has extensive graffiti. It was a popular urban exploration and graffiti art site until a spate of incidents at the site, including a 24 year old man who fell to his death in 2016 whilst accessing the upper levels unreachable by the demolished internal stairways. Authorities reinforced the metal barricade fencing that explorers had cut holes in, and installed constant surveillance towers and on-site security to deter potential visitors.

South Fremantle Power Station in 2025

The building is derelict, with all windows destroyed, predominantly through vandalism. Both the concrete and the steel of the structure have deteriorated through the ingress of water.

== Redevelopment ==
In June 2021, the owner of the South Fremantle Power Station, Synergy, in turn owned by the Government of Western Australia, put the site up for sale. The deadline for offers was 2 July 2021 and Synergy hoped to complete the sale by September 2021. The redevelopment of the site was seen as costly and would require experience with developing a heritage site.

Despite the short time of listing the property for sale and its recent listing as state heritage, twelve offers for the South Fremantle Power Station were received in the first twenty four hours of listing.
