= Let It Happen =

Single by Tame Impala

from the album Currents
- Released: 10 March 2015
- Studio: Kevin Parker's home studio (Fremantle, Western Australia)
- Genre: Psychedelic pop; synth-pop; disco; progressive disco; psychedelic rock
- Length: 7:47 (album version); 4:16 (radio edit)
- Label: Modular; Fiction; Interscope
- Songwriter: Kevin Parker
- Producer: Kevin Parker

Tame Impala singles chronology
"Mind Mischief" (2013)	"Let It Happen" (2015)	"'Cause I'm a Man" (2015)

Music video
- "Let It Happen" on YouTube

"Let It Happen" is a song by Tame Impala, the project of Australian rock artist Kevin Parker. It was released as the lead single from his third studio album, Currents (2015), on 10 March 2015. The song explores themes of personal transition and was developed in various locations around the world. The song runs at nearly eight minutes long, and its second half contains a section of the song repeating akin to a scratched Compact Disc, and stripped-down lyrics consisting of gibberish. It also has vocoded-like vocals in the second half, which were actually manipulated with a keyboard sampler. Like with the rest of Currents, Parker was the song's sole writer and producer.

The song received widespread acclaim from music critics, who lauded its production, catchiness and creativity. It peaked at number 29 on the Belgian Flanders singles chart, number 84 on the ARIA Singles Chart and number 152 on the French Singles Chart. In the United States, the song charted at number 28 on Billboard's Adult Alternative Songs chart. "Let It Happen" appeared on many critics' year-end lists of the best songs of 2015. A music video for the song was uploaded on 17 August 2015 to the project's Vevo channel on YouTube.

It won Song of the Year at the APRA Music Awards of 2016.

== Background ==
"Let It Happen" is about "finding yourself always in this world of chaos and all this stuff going on around you and always shutting it out because you don't want to be part of it. But at some point, you realize it takes more energy to shut it out than it does to let it happen and be a part of 'it'." The theme of Currents is personal transition, and "Let It Happen" was sequenced as the album's opening song to exemplify acceptance.

Parker detailed the song's globetrotting development in an interview with Under the Radar in 2015:

I think most of that song was put together at different times, when I was on tour, actually. I remember it came to me, I think I was walking to my hotel room in Oklahoma. And then the chorus, I was at a festival in Hungary or Turkey. And then the midsection, the jam bit, I was on a train. That's a bit looping and a weird repetitive thing going on, and I had my laptop on a train in France, going to Toulouse. I think with that song, one thing led to another. I was just jamming by myself in the way I do, and I put it on a loop to see what sounds cool. I just see where it takes me.

== Composition ==
"Let It Happen" is a psychedelic pop, disco, synth-pop, progressive disco and psychedelic rock song. At one point, the song begins to skip, reminiscent of a skipping compact disc. Producer Kevin Parker included this as an extension of his fascination with glitches in playback. Nearing the song's conclusion, Parker begins singing wordless melodies through a keyboard sampler. He intended to write lyrics for the section, which he dubbed the "speaking in tongues version", but found that it lacked the "groove" of its original incarnation. In keeping with the song's title and subject matter, he left the gibberish in the final track.

== Release and remixes ==
"Let It Happen" premiered on 10 March 2015 as a free digital download from the band's website. Tame Impala first shared the track on their Facebook page, writing, "NEW SONG. Track 1." It was the first song released from Currents, and was intended to kick off a promotional cycle concluding with the release of the album and the band's Coachella appearance in May, but the record was subsequently delayed until July.

A remix of the song by electronic rock group Soulwax premiered on Zane Lowe's Beats 1 show on 8 September 2015. The song was also covered by Australian metalcore band Northlane, on the deluxe version of their album Node.

== Music video ==
The official music video for the song, lasting four minutes and seventeen seconds, was uploaded on 17 August 2015 to the group's Vevo channel on YouTube. Stereogum summed up the video, stating that the video's protagonist (Michael Instone) "blurs the line between nervous breakdown, medical crisis, and hallucination, most memorably when he finds himself strapped to an airplane seat falling through the sky." It was directed by David Wilson. The music video was shot in Kyiv, Ukraine (Boryspil International Airport and Hilton Kyiv).

== Critical reception ==
Upon its release, the song received critical acclaim. Pitchfork reviewer Ian Cohen awarded it the site's "Best New Track" designation, writing that the song "seems to be editing itself in real time with all manner of filters, manipulated vocals, swirling ambience, and a startling midsection where he mashes down the looper button and holds it. He's an expert at conveying the unexpected joy of beginner's luck behind the boards." Michelle Geslani of Consequence of Sound similarly praised the song's second section, commenting, "The song's second half proves especially inspiring, as it features a full-on wicked, synth-y jam session and magical vocoder harmonies."

=== Accolades ===
"Let It Happen" on year-end lists
Critic/Publication	List	Rank	Ref.
NPR	Favorite Songs of 2015	No ranking given	
APRA Music Awards of 2016	Song of the Year	1	

"Let It Happen" appeared on many critics' year-end lists of the best songs of 2015. Consequence of Sound ranked the song second-best of the year, calling it a "grand statement", "meticulously arranged", and "one of the boldest album openers of the year". The publication also said, "It's the best song [Parker's] ever written from the best album he's ever made." Pitchfork placed the song fifth on its year-end list, calling it a "highly intimate, interior experience" that "isn't so much psych rock as psyche rock—the sort of insta-jam that feels like it's being broadcast to you via telepathy rather than a stadium PA."

Spin ranked the song seventh on the magazine's list of the year's best songs, calling it "the Discovery of psych-rock, eight minutes of steady vamping that coalesce into an ideal synthesis of Tame Impala's gentle, kaleidoscopic powers and big-tent EDM's ability to physically command." The Fader ranked the song seventh-best, calling it "a jittery, stretched-out, immaculately produced sound bath that washes over the listener, beckoning them to submerge in the madness of feeling feels". Time ranked it seventh-best as well, describing it as "mov[ing] through all the states of matter: lava-lamp keyboards give way to gaseous soundscapes, robot voices depose into fuzzy guitar riffs, and stuttering sound effects briefly make you think your speakers are having a meltdown."

Paste placed it ninth on their year-end song rankings, calling it the album's "thesis statement" and saying, "The song's multiple movements swell and bloom into the cosmic psych-rock that Tame Impala so cleverly wielded on Innerspeaker and Lonerism, but there's a new dimension added this time around". Popmatters ranked it eleventh-best of the year, calling it "both the album's overture and its thematic peak" while praising it for "hit[ting] a pinnacle for a contemporary indie pop more indebted to classic disco records than Pavement or the Pixies". Rolling Stone ranked "Let It Happen" at number 17 on its year-end list of the 50 best songs of 2015. The Village Voice named "Let It Happen" the 14th-best single released in 2015 on their annual year-end critics' poll, Pazz & Jop. Noisey named the song the 25th-best of the year, calling it "a near eight-minute tortured wail—as defiant as it is fearful" and "a remarkable, hallucinatory exercise as comfortable in a sprawling cosmic DJ set as it is a dorm room bong sesh."

At the 2015 ARIA Music Awards, "Let It Happen" was nominated for Best Pop Release. Along with "The Less I Know the Better", the song was one of two from Tame Impala's Currents to reach the top five in the Triple J Hottest 100, 2015, coming in at #5.

"Let It Happen" appeared on several critics' end-of-decade lists of the best songs. Pitchfork ranked it the 47th-best song of the 2010s, with contributor Noah Yoo commenting, "with this heavy slab of space disco, Parker decidedly broke free of any preconceived notions about his abilities". Stereogum's Pranav Trewn ranked it 35th best, describing it as Parker's way of "fashioning EDM as high art". It was ranked at the same spot on NME's similar list. In 2020, it was voted as the best song of the 21st century by the listeners of the Dutch radio station NPO 3FM.

== Appearances in media ==
In September 2018, an edited version of the song appeared in a Ford Motor Company television advertisement for their 2019 car lineup. The song also appeared in a 2022 documentary about England cricketer Ben Stokes called Ben Stokes: Phoenix from the Ashes in a montage about Stokes' success on the cricket field.

== Track listing ==
Download single
No.	Title	Length
1.	"Let It Happen"	7:47

== Charts ==
=== Weekly charts ===
Chart (2015–16)	Peak position
Australia (ARIA)	84
Belgium (Ultratop 50 Flanders)	19
Belgium (Ultratip Bubbling Under Wallonia)	21
France (SNEP)	152
US Adult Alternative Airplay (Billboard)	28
US Hot Rock & Alternative Songs (Billboard)	41

Chart (2026)	Peak position
Netherlands (Single Tip)	18
Norway (IFPI Norge)	57
Portugal (AFP)	123
Sweden Heatseeker (Sverigetopplistan)	11
Switzerland (Schweizer Hitparade)	85

=== Year-end charts ===
Chart (2016)	Position
Belgium (Ultratop Flanders)	78

== Certifications ==
Region	Certification	Certified units/sales
Australia (ARIA)	4× Platinum	280,000^{‡}
Brazil (Pro-Música Brasil)	Platinum	60,000^{‡}
Denmark (IFPI Danmark)	Gold	45,000^{‡}
New Zealand (RMNZ)	2× Platinum	60,000^{‡}
Poland (ZPAV)	Gold	25,000^{‡}
United Kingdom (BPI)	Platinum	600,000^{‡}
United States (RIAA)	Platinum	1,000,000^{‡}
^{‡} Sales+streaming figures based on certification alone.

== Release history ==
Region	Date	Label	Format
Worldwide	11 March 2015	Modular	Digital download
