= The Less I Know the Better =

Single by Tame Impala

from the album Currents
- Released: 29 November 2015
- Recorded: 2014–2015; Kevin Parker's home studio (Fremantle, Western Australia)
- Genre: Disco; funk; psychedelic pop; disco-rock
- Length: 3:36
- Label: Modular; Interscope
- Songwriter: Kevin Parker
- Producer: Kevin Parker

Tame Impala singles chronology
"Eventually" (2015)	"The Less I Know the Better" (2015)	"Patience" (2019)

Music video
- "The Less I Know the Better" on YouTube

"The Less I Know the Better" is a song released by the Australian music project Tame Impala on 29 November 2015 as the fourth and final single from their third studio album, Currents. The song's accompanying music video mixes hand-drawn animation with live action and takes place in a high school, especially the gym and locker room, where a male basketball player suffers a broken heart.

In 2016, the song peaked at number 23 on the Belgian Flanders singles chart, number 66 on the ARIA Singles Chart, and number 195 on the French Singles Chart. In the US, the song charted at number 35 on Billboard's Hot Rock Songs chart. The song, along with "Let It Happen", was one of two singles from Currents to reach the top five in Triple J's Hottest 100 of 2015, ranking at number 4, whilst "Let It Happen" ranked at number 5.

It also topped Triple J's Hottest 100 of the 2010s in March 2020. The week after reaching number 1 in Triple J's Hottest 100 of the 2010s, the song entered the ARIA Top 50 for the first time, charting 49 places higher than its previous peak of number 66. On May 3rd, 2021, APRA AMCOS confirmed the song surpassed one billion streams. It surpassed two billion streams on June 17th, 2025.

== Background and composition ==
Parker stated that "The Less I Know the Better" originated from his love of disco:

That song originally I thought shouldn't be on a Tame Impala album, because it has this dorky, white disco funk. I wouldn't call it cheesy, but it's not trying to be too cool, because the lyrics are pretty dorky and the groove is pretty dorky. But at the same time, for me, I love that kind of music. I don't know why, but I've been obsessed with disco for the last year or two.

According to Parker, recording the song became obsessive. He recalled performing over 1,057 partial vocal takes for either "The Less I Know the Better" or the album's second single, "'Cause I'm a Man", though he could not recall which.

Parker stated the song was at one point given to Mark Ronson for his album Uptown Special before Ronson returned it to him:

I gave it to Mark Ronson for his album, but I took it back. I was putting off telling him that I wanted to use it for me. I was in America recording with him for a few days. I was like, "Ok now, [I’ve] got to tell him I want it for me." When I finally mustered up the strength, he was like, "Oh yeah, dude, I was going to say this song is yours. I feel like I’ve stolen your hard drive!" He was thinking the same thing anyway.

The song is written in the key of C-sharp minor and at a moderate tempo of around 118 beats per minute.

== Critical reception ==
"The Less I Know the Better" received widespread acclaim from both critics and the public. The track was widely praised for its modern psychedelic production, catchy melody, and emotionally impactful lyrics about jealousy and romantic disillusionment. Critics highlighted the funk and disco influences, with the song's prominent bass groove considered one of its standout features. Ian Cohen, from Pitchfork, noted the song's similarities to Michael Jackson's albums Thriller and Bad. Triple J, from ABC News (Australia), described the track as brilliant.

In 2025, the song placed 19 in the Triple J Hottest 100 of Australian Songs.

== Music video ==
The official music video for the song was uploaded on 29 November 2015 to the group's Vevo channel. The video follows a male high school basketball player lusting after a cheerleader who soon begins a relationship with the team's gorilla mascot (named "Trevor", a reference to the lyric "She was holding hands with Trevor" in the song). The music video was filmed by the Barcelona-based creative collective and directors known as Canada. The two primary lovebirds in the video are played by Spanish actors: the cheerleader is portrayed by actress Laia Manzanares; the basketball player by actor Albert Baró.

Lars Brandle of Billboard described it as "a strange tale of high school lust and jealousy (and King Kong) played out in a technicolor trip", while Luke Saunders of Happy Mag called it a "seriously incredible experience".

== Charts ==
=== Weekly charts ===
2015–16 weekly chart performance for "The Less I Know the Better"
Chart (2015–2016)	Peak position
Australia (ARIA)	66
Belgium (Ultratop 50 Flanders)	23
Belgium (Ultratip Bubbling Under Wallonia)	8
Czech Republic Airplay (ČNS IFPI)	55
France (SNEP)	195
Lithuania (AGATA)	82
US Hot Rock & Alternative Songs (Billboard)	35

2020 weekly chart performance for "The Less I Know the Better"
Chart (2020)	Peak position
Australia (ARIA)	17

2025–2026 weekly chart performance for "The Less I Know the Better"
Chart (2025–2026)	Peak position
Global 200 (Billboard)	86
Greece International (IFPI)	62
Lithuania (AGATA)	55
Netherlands (Single Tip)	5
Norway (IFPI Norge)	54
Portugal (AFP)	63
Sweden Heatseeker (Sverigetopplistan)	4
Switzerland (Schweizer Hitparade)	63

=== Year-end charts ===
2016 year-end chart performance for "The Less I Know the Better"
Chart (2016)	Position
US Hot Rock & Alternative Songs (Billboard)	74

2020 year-end chart performance for "The Less I Know the Better"
Chart (2020)	Position
Australia (ARIA)	88

== Certifications ==
Certifications for "The Less I Know the Better"
Region	Certification	Certified units/sales
Australia (ARIA)	10× Platinum	700,000^{‡}
Belgium (BRMA)	Gold	20,000^{‡}
Brazil (Pro-Música Brasil)	Diamond	250,000^{‡}
Canada (Music Canada)	Gold	40,000^{‡}
Denmark (IFPI Danmark)	2× Platinum	180,000^{‡}
Germany (BVMI)	Gold	200,000^{‡}
Italy (FIMI)	Platinum	100,000^{‡}
New Zealand (RMNZ)	6× Platinum	180,000^{‡}
Poland (ZPAV)	2× Platinum	100,000^{‡}
Portugal (AFP)	4× Platinum	100,000^{‡}
Spain (Promusicae)	Platinum	60,000^{‡}
United Kingdom (BPI)	3× Platinum	1,800,000^{‡}
United States (RIAA)	4× Platinum	4,000,000^{‡}
Streaming
Greece (IFPI Greece)	2× Platinum	4,000,000^{†}
^{‡} Sales+streaming figures based on certification alone.^{†} Streaming-only figures based on certification alone.

== See also ==
- List of highest-certified singles in Australia
