= 'Cause I'm a Man =

2015 single by Tame Impala

Single by Tame Impala

from the album Currents
- Released: 7 April 2015
- Studio: Kevin Parker's home studio; (Fremantle, Western Australia)
- Genre: Psychedelic pop; soft rock; R&B; chillwave
- Length: 4:02
- Label: Modular; Interscope
- Songwriter: Kevin Parker
- Producer: Kevin Parker

Tame Impala singles chronology
"Let It Happen" (2015)	"'Cause I'm a Man" (2015)	"Eventually" (2015)

Music video
- "'Cause I'm a Man" on YouTube

"'Cause I'm a Man" is a song by Australian musical project Tame Impala, released on 7 April 2015 as the second single from their third studio album Currents. The song peaked at number 80 on the ARIA Singles Chart. A music video for the song was uploaded on 21 May 2015 on the project's Vevo channel on YouTube.

== Background ==
Kevin Parker described the song as being "about how weak men are basically, and how we make all these excuses." In the song, Parker's vocals are clearer in the mix than in previous Tame Impala songs, an extension of his love of "that dreamy, silvery vocal sound." It was difficult for him, as he was uncomfortable with his vocal performance. According to Parker, recording the song became obsessive. He recalled performing over 1,057 partial vocal takes for either "'Cause I'm a Man" or the album's fourth single, "The Less I Know the Better", though he could not recall which.

The song courted controversy over its lyrics, which could be considered sexist. Parker addressed this in an interview with Stereogum:

It's really meant to be interpreted more like 'I'm a man' as in 'I'm a human. I'm merely a man.'" I understand how it can be perceived as sexist, almost misogynistic, but put it this way: I know deep in my heart, I am not in any way sexist. And I knew there would be people who would think that. There was a small part of me that was excited about ruffling some feathers 'cause I never do that, you know? I'm not that kind of person.

Parker intended the song as tongue-in-cheek, and noted that interpreting the song in such a way disappointed him.

== Release and remixes ==
The song debuted on Australia's Triple J on 5 April 2015, and was released for digital download on 7 April 2015.

A remix of the song by pop rock band Haim premiered on 6 August 2015. According to Billboard, Tame Impala asked Haim to remix the song, and subsequently promoted the song via their social media accounts. The song has been noted as more of a cover version than a remix, and Danielle Haim acknowledged this: "We've never really done a "remix" before so we decided to put out our own spin on the song."

== Critical reception ==
Evan Minsker of Pitchfork gave it the site's "Best New Track" designation, praising the song's universal theme and R&B balladry: "It's a vulnerable song—one with regret, sure, but also affection." Ryan Reed at Billboard gave it four stars out of five, praising the song as a "soulful single" spread over "four gorgeous minutes."

=== Accolades ===
The Arizona Republic ranked the song number seven on its list of the top 30 songs of 2015.

== Music video ==
The song received two music videos. The first "official" music video for the song, lasting four minutes and four seconds, was uploaded on 21 May 2015 to the group's Vevo channel on YouTube. The video is a 3D animation centered on a man with no face and his events in life involving work, women, and "the ultimate pitfalls of life", as stated by AXS TV. It was directed by Nicky Smith. The second, directed by Dan Dipaola and Megan McShane, features puppet versions of Tame Impala performing the song, and was released on 28 May. In June, Feltworth, a puppet band connected with the Canadian group Sloan, released a clip wherein its members debate the merits of the second clip.

== Track listing ==
Digital download
No.	Title	Length
1.	"'Cause I'm a Man"	4:02

== Charts ==
Chart (2015)	Peak position
Australia (ARIA)	80
Switzerland Airplay (Schweizer Hitparade)	74

== Certifications ==
Region	Certification	Certified units/sales
Australia (ARIA)	Gold	35,000^{‡}
New Zealand (RMNZ)	Gold	15,000^{‡}
United States (RIAA)	Gold	500,000^{‡}
^{‡} Sales+streaming figures based on certification alone.

== Release history ==
Region	Date	Label	Format
Various	7 April 2015	Modular	Digital download
