= Zdeněk Ziegler (artist) =

Czech poster artist (1932–2023)

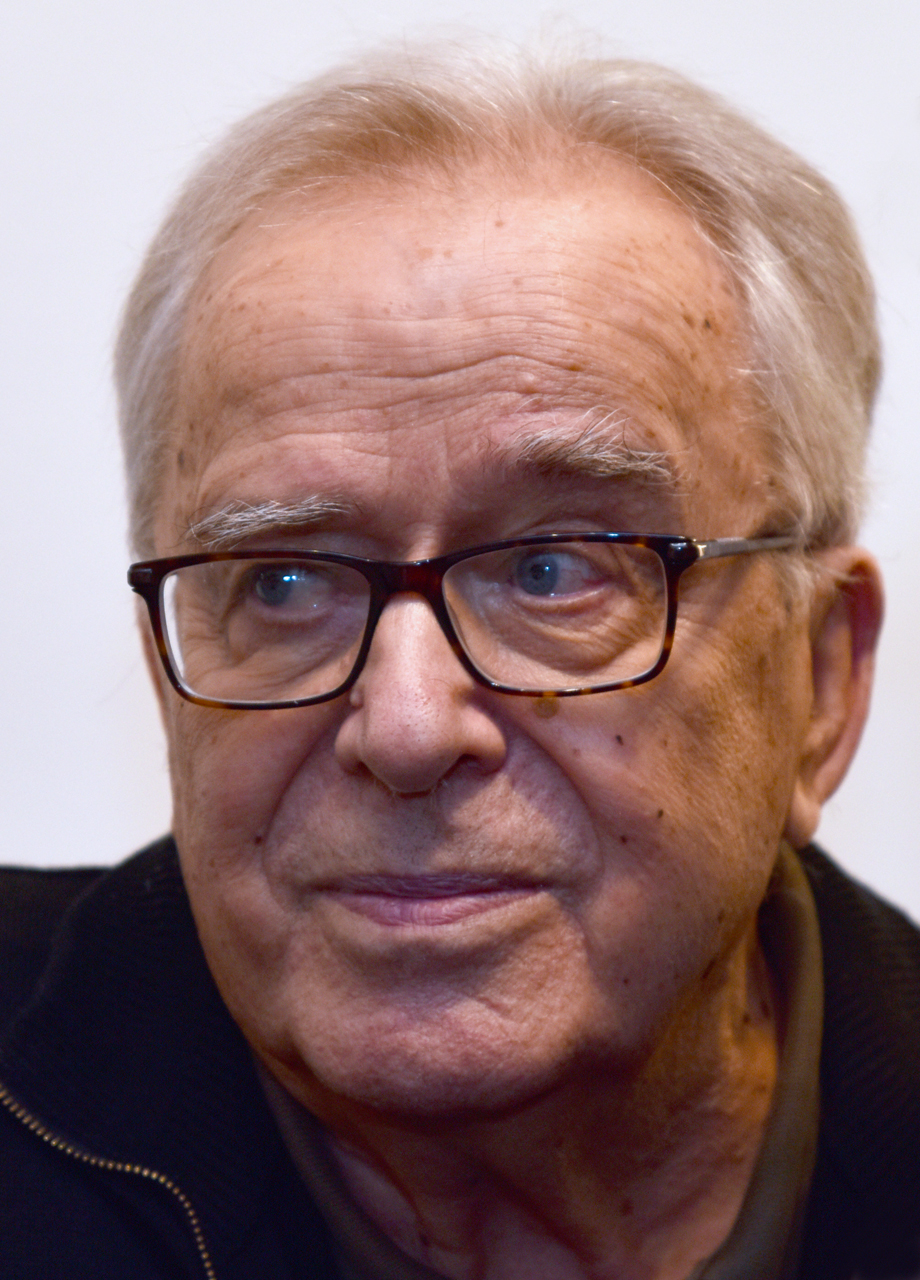
- Ziegler in 2020
- Born: 27 October 1932; Prague, Czechoslovakia
- Died: 18 April 2023 (aged 90); Prague, Czech Republic
- Education: Czech Technical University in Prague

Zdeněk Ziegler (27 October 1932 – 18 April 2023) was a Czech graphic artist.

== Life ==
Ziegler was born on 27 October 1932 in Prague. From 1955 to 1961, he studied at the Czech Technical University in Prague. He began designing film posters in 1964. In 1990, he began teaching at the Academy of Arts, Architecture and Design in Prague and was chancellor from 2000 to 2003.

Ziegler created 200 film posters in the years 1963–1989. He was a member of Alliance Graphique Internationale and the Association of Czech Graphic Designers.

In 2013, he was inducted into the Czech Design Hall of Fame.

He died on 18 April 2023 in Prague.

== Awards ==
Year	Received from	Placement	Film Poster	Ref.
1964	Montreal	Silver medal	For Eyes Only	
1965	Colombo	Silver Medal	And the Fifth Horseman Is Fear	
1976	Chicago International Film Festival	Gold Hugo	Electra Glide in Blue	
1977	The Hollywood Reporter	Honorable Mention	Dersu Uzala	
1982	Chicago International Film Festival	Silver Plaquette	Green Eyes	
1983	Chicago International Film Festival	Bronze Hugo	A Shot in the Back	
	University of West Bohemia	Ladislav Sutnar Award		
