= Elephant (Tame Impala song) =

2012 single by Tame Impala

Single by Tame Impala

from the album Lonerism
- Released: 26 July 2012
- Genre: Psychedelic rock; garage rock; stoner rock; alternative rock; glam rock
- Length: 3:31
- Label: Modular
- Songwriters: Kevin Parker; Jay Watson
- Producer: Kevin Parker

Tame Impala singles chronology
"Why Won't You Make Up Your Mind?" (2011)	"Elephant" (2012)	"Feels Like We Only Go Backwards" (2012)

"Elephant" is a song by Australian musical project Tame Impala, released on 26 July 2012 as the lead single from their second album, Lonerism (2012). The single features artwork from Australian artist Leif Podhajsky, who also created the artwork for Innerspeaker and the follow-up Lonerism.

"Elephant" was covered by children's music group the Wiggles for Australian youth broadcaster Triple J's Like a Version segment on 5 March 2021, which won the station's Hottest 100 of 2021.

== Background ==
Kevin Parker explains:

Elephant is actually one of the oldest songs that I have, it's just been in the vaults this whole time. I'm not sure why we never recorded it before, but we were just playing it at a sound check one night and everyone in the band was like, 'We should just put this on the album', and so we did.

— Kevin Parker

"Elephant" features a bluesier side of Tame Impala, heard more frequently on their self-titled extended play, as the song was written around that time. Thus "Elephant" is "an anomaly on Lonerism. There are no other songs that have that bluesy riffing".

In a retrospective interview with Beats 1 in 2019, Parker spoke of his surprise at how successful the track became. "I always thought it was a bit shallow, a bit cringe. But now I appreciate 'Elephant', because the character I'm singing about, from the loner's perspective... it's how I always envisioned big, egotistical people who would march around. It's kind of how a loner might see a jock—like an elephant." In the same interview, Parker added that his favourite Lonerism lyric is from "Elephant": "He pulled the mirrors off his Cadillac / 'Cause he doesn't like it looking like he looks back".

== Critical reception ==
Alicia Dennis from Zimbio called "Elephant" "the best psych-rock song ever written about a pompous jerk", while Nick Patch of the Times Colonist described it as a "distortion-drenched garage-rocker". It is also viewed as a "glam-rock gem" by the webzine PlayGround. Joe Levy from Rolling Stone stated that the song was "Tame Impala's 2012 alt-rock hit", describing the guitar riff as "gong-banging glam". Ian Cohen of Pitchfork gave the song the "Best New Track" accolade, praising its production and stating that it "splits wide open during its midsection for an expansive and lyrical guitar jam that these guys are doing better than just about anyone else right now." Nathan Reese of Refinery29 described the song as the group's "meaner, more immediate take on its garage-psych sound". He also commented that the song "with dueling keyboard and guitar solos that arrive midway through" resembles Pink Floyd's "Lucifer Sam", "channeled through the Stooges".

== Awards ==
- Appeared at No. 7 on Triple J's Hottest 100 for 2012.
- Won Best Song at the EG Music Awards
- Zane Lowe declared it the "Hottest Record in the World" for 26 July 2012.
- The song won Song of the Year at the APRA Music Awards in 2013.
- The video won Video of the Year at the 2013 West Australian Music Industry Awards.

== Chart performance ==
=== Weekly charts ===
Weekly chart performance for "Elephant"
Chart (2013)	Peak position
Australia (ARIA)	77
UK Singles (Official Charts Company)	131
US Hot Rock & Alternative Songs (Billboard)	36
US Rock & Alternative Airplay (Billboard)	12
US Alternative Airplay (Billboard)	8
US Mainstream Rock Airplay (Billboard)	40

=== Year-end charts ===
Year-end chart performance for "Elephant"
Chart (2013)	Peak position
US Hot Rock Songs (Billboard)	89
US Rock Airplay (Billboard)	33
US Alternative Songs (Billboard)	24

== Certifications ==
Certifications for "Elephant"
Region	Certification	Certified units/sales
Australia (ARIA)	Platinum	70,000^{‡}
Canada (Music Canada)	Gold	40,000^{‡}
New Zealand (RMNZ)	Platinum	30,000^{‡}
United Kingdom (BPI)	Gold	400,000^{‡}
United States (RIAA)	Gold	500,000^{‡}
^{‡} Sales+streaming figures based on certification alone.

== The Wiggles version ==
"Elephant (Triple J Like a Version)"

Single by the Wiggles

from the album ReWiggled
- Released: 12 March 2021
- Recorded: 5 March 2021
- Studio: Like a Version studio, Triple J (Sydney, Australia)
- Length: 3:22
- Label: ABC Music
- Songwriters: Kevin Parker; Jay Watson
- Producer: Anthony Field

The Wiggles singles chronology
"We're All Fruit Salad" (2021)	"Elephant (Triple J Like a Version)" (2021)	"The ABC New Zealand Alphabet Song" (2021)

Music video
- "Elephant (Triple J Like a Version)" on YouTube

Australian children's music band the Wiggles covered "Elephant" for Australian youth broadcaster Triple J's Like a Version segment on 5 March 2021, during which they interpolated their original song "Fruit Salad" throughout the performance. The cover was released as a single through ABC Music the following week, on 12 March 2021.

"Elephant" was included on the Wiggles' compilation album ReWiggled (2022), which features the group performing covers of songs by various Australian artists.

The performing line-up included new and original Wiggles Lachy Gillespie, Anthony Field, Simon Pryce, Emma Watkins, Jeff Fatt, and Murray Cook.

The cover received instantaneous acclaim, with various people, including comedian Andy Lee, flagging it as a contender for the station's Hottest 100 countdown. It later emerged as a favourite to top the 2021 poll, which it ultimately won, becoming the first cover song to do so.

On 26 January 2022, Australian Recording Industry Association (ARIA) published their mid-week chart, in which they revealed the cover was likely to make its debut on the ARIA Top 50 Singles Chart that week. On 28 January, the song debuted at number 10 on the ARIA Singles Chart dated 31 January, becoming the Wiggles' first top fifty appearance in the process.

=== Charts ===
Chart performance for "Elephant" (The Wiggles version)
Chart (2022)	Peak position
Australia (ARIA)	10

=== Certifications ===
Region	Certification	Certified units/sales
Australia (ARIA)	Gold	35,000^{‡}
^{‡} Sales+streaming figures based on certification alone.
