= Mind Mischief =

2012 song by Tame Impala

Single by Tame Impala

from the album Lonerism
- Released: 26 January 2013
- Genre: Psychedelic rock; psychedelic pop; neo-psychedelia
- Length: 4:31
- Label: Modular
- Songwriter: Kevin Parker
- Producer: Kevin Parker

Tame Impala singles chronology
"Feels Like We Only Go Backwards" (2012)	"Mind Mischief" (2013)	"Let It Happen" (2015)

"Mind Mischief" is a song by Australian psychedelic rock project Tame Impala. It is the fourth track on their 2012 album Lonerism, and was released as its third and final single on 26 January 2013. Kevin Parker wrote the song, and he also performed all the vocals and instruments on it by himself. A live performance of the song was also released on the album Live Versions.

The single peaked at number 38 on the Mexico Ingles Airplay chart.

== Music video ==
A music video for "Mind Mischief" was made. It was filmed on the premises of Ashlyns School in Berkhamsted, England. The video was controversial however, as it features a male student (played by Bill Milner) fantasising about his female teacher. The head teacher of the school, James Shapland, said: "If we had known it was going to be quite like that, we would not have agreed to it".

== Reception ==
Paste ranked "Mind Mischief" the third best Tame Impala song. They thought that it had the catchiest guitar riff written by Parker, as well as perhaps his most interesting percussion.

In 2015, Ciara Knight, writing for the Irish website Joe, ranked "Mind Mischief" #22 on her ranking of every Tame Impala song. She wrote: "From the first guitar chord the tone is set for what is guaranteed to be a slow but punchy little jam that's best enjoyed late in the day, ideally with a beer and a cigarette".

The Australian website Beat considered "Mind Mischief" to be one of the best Tame Impala songs, and called it an adored cut, as it "presents a stellar drum loop and magnetic bass line".

== Personnel ==
Kevin Parker – all vocals and instruments

== Certifications ==
Certifications for "Mind Mischief"
Region	Certification	Certified units/sales
Australia (ARIA)	Gold	35,000^{‡}
^{‡} Sales+streaming figures based on certification alone.
