= Feels Like We Only Go Backwards =

Single by Tame Impala

from the album Lonerism
- Released: 1 October 2012
- Genre: Psychedelic rock; psychedelic pop; neo-psychedelia
- Length: 3:12
- Label: Modular
- Songwriter: Kevin Parker
- Producer: Kevin Parker

Tame Impala singles chronology
"Elephant" (2012)	"Feels Like We Only Go Backwards" (2012)	"Mind Mischief" (2013)

"Feels Like We Only Go Backwards" is a song by Australian psychedelic rock band Tame Impala. It is the seventh track on their 2012 album Lonerism, and was released as its second single on 1 October 2012. The single features artwork from Australian artist Leif Podhajsky, who also created the artwork for their first album, Innerspeaker. In an interview with Rick Rubin on the podcast Broken Record, Kevin Parker said he wrote "Feels Like We Only Go Backwards" after being inspired by "Walk in the Park" by Beach House.

At the 2013 West Australian Music Industry Awards, the song won Single of the Year.

== Music video ==
The music video was directed by Joseph Pelling and Becky Sloan, best known as creators of Don't Hug Me I'm Scared web series. The music video consists of psychedelic clay animation.

== Critical reception ==
The song was voted on many year end best of lists in 2012. Pitchfork named it the 7th best song of 2012, and said of the track; "it will blow your brain back to its most purely joyous and least cynical recesses." The same website also ranked it #192 on their list of the 200 best songs of the 2010s. It placed ninth on the Triple J Hottest 100 of 2012.

== Usage in media ==
"Feels Like We Only Go Backwards" was used in the promotion of Via X's Chilean TV program Moov.

The Irish sports podcast Second Captains used the song as the theme music for its 2014 FIFA World Cup coverage.

The collaboration version of the song (with Kendrick Lamar) was featured in the movie Divergent.

The song was used in the Netflix show The Imperfects.

The song plays over the credits of the film Shimmer Lake, which features a narrative told in reverse.

The song was also used in the 2021 drama We Children of Bahnhof Zoo.

== Charts ==
Chart (2014)	Peak position
Belgium (Ultratip Bubbling Under Flanders)	67
US Alternative Airplay (Billboard)	37

== Certifications ==
Region	Certification	Certified units/sales
Australia (ARIA)	3× Platinum	210,000^{‡}
Brazil (Pro-Música Brasil)	Platinum	60,000^{‡}
Denmark (IFPI Danmark)	Gold	45,000^{‡}
New Zealand (RMNZ)	2× Platinum	60,000^{‡}
United Kingdom (BPI)	Platinum	600,000^{‡}
United States (RIAA)	Platinum	1,000,000^{‡}
^{‡} Sales+streaming figures based on certification alone.
