= Lonerism =

Studio album by Tame Impala
- Released: 5 October 2012
- Recorded: 2010–2012
- Studios: Kevin Parker's home studios in Perth and Paris
- Genres: Psychedelic rock; psychedelic pop; neo-psychedelia; dream pop; lo-fi
- Length: 51:53
- Label: Modular
- Producer: Kevin Parker

Tame Impala chronology
Innerspeaker (2010)	Lonerism (2012)	Live Versions (2014)

Singles from Lonerism
- 1. "Elephant" Released: 26 July 2012; 2. "Feels Like We Only Go Backwards" Released: 1 October 2012; 3. "Mind Mischief" Released: 26 January 2013

Lonerism is the second studio album by Australian musical project Tame Impala, released on 5 October 2012 by Modular Recordings. Like his debut studio album, Innerspeaker (2010), Lonerism was written, recorded, performed, and produced by Kevin Parker, with live member Jay Watson contributing on two tracks. Recorded mostly in Perth, Australia, and Paris, France, Lonerism builds on the psychedelic sound of its predecessor, favoring synthesizers and samples over guitars. Parker attempted to incorporate his love for pop music into his songwriting for the record through catchier melodies. Many tracks feature ambient sounds recorded by Parker with a dictaphone. The album's theme of isolation is reflected in the album cover, featuring an image of a fenced-off Jardin du Luxembourg in Paris.

Lonerism was heavily acclaimed. Many critics ranked it among the best albums of 2012. It reached number four on the charts in Australia, number 14 in the United Kingdom, and number 34 in the United States. It has sold over 210,000 copies in the United States, and is certified platinum in Australia and silver in the UK. At the 2013 ARIA Awards, Lonerism won Best Rock Album and Album of the Year, while at the 56th Annual Grammy Awards, it was nominated for Best Alternative Music Album. Three singles were released, including "Elephant" and "Feels Like We Only Go Backwards", which charted in several countries. At the J Awards of 2012, the album won Australian Album of the Year.

== Background ==
Tame Impala's debut album, Innerspeaker, was released to widespread acclaim in 2010, winning a J Award and a Rolling Stone Award for Album of the Year, and 5 nominations at the ARIAs. This led to Tame Impala's global Innerspeaker Tour from 2010 to 2011.

== Recording ==
Kevin Parker started writing and recording new material for Lonerism almost immediately after releasing Innerspeaker, saying "I started writing songs straight after Innerspeaker, but I told myself I wouldn't get hung up with the pressure, so I kinda pretended they were for some other weird project that wasn't going to have as much consequence". While Innerspeaker was recorded in a very structured manner with a designated time period to record, Parker recorded Lonerism in many different places around the world whilst touring with Tame Impala. Speaking about this, Parker revealed "I've got a recording thing with me at the moment, I can do vocal takes and guitar takes wherever I am, so it's getting recorded all over the world. There's a guitar take in Vienna, or a vocal take in the aeroplane from Singapore to London. I've got my studio at home, so a lot is being done in Perth."

Speaking about the recording process in a 2019 interview with Beats 1's Matt Wilkinson, Parker went into more detail about his home setup in Perth: "It was this amazing time of unhinged experimentation and exploration. I would record until 5am, I'd go to sleep and wake up and start again. I'd just be drinking red wine all night and smoking spliffs. It was this really, really amazing time. This period of discovery. I had found a new guitar sound which led to me finding a new way of writing chords. And these new chords were making me write music that was conjuring up emotions that I hadn't felt in a long time. It reminded me of being a child again, basically."

With the success of Innerspeaker, Parker had "So much more time. With Innerspeaker, we had an engineer come in, we booked a location, we got a house; it was all very official. With this album, it was just me in my home studio. I still had two other housemates, but Tame Impala paid for one of the rooms with the band account and all the money we got from festivals. I started so soon after finishing the last album, so it ended up being two years before the label was expecting to see something. There was time to experiment and completely indulge." With the extra time to record, Parker gave into his desire to make "cheesy pop" songs and said "I've got a whole album waiting for Kylie Minogue. That sounds like a joke, but I actually do. I have seven songs ready."

In late 2010, Parker ran into some problems with the new album: "I had all these demos, half of the new album, on my iPod. And I've got a hole in my bag and it fell out somewhere between Amsterdam and London. So I've been really freaked out recently that the album's just going to turn up on YouTube, half finished, or that it's just going to come out under some other Dutch band name." The demos were later found and returned to Parker. Parker later relocated to Paris in 2011 and "crammed into this little Paris apartment, which looks like a reclusive bunker".

The recording of the album was completed by late 2011, while the mixing of the album was started on 7 December 2011 and completed on 2 March 2012, with Parker again enlisting the help of famed producer Dave Fridmann after Fridmann mixed previous album Innerspeaker. Parker says he felt "paranoid" about the album before he put it out.

The working title of the album was Loner Pop, but was changed last second by Parker to Lonerism.

A controversial music video for the track "Mind Mischief" was filmed on the premises of Ashlyns School in Berkhamsted, England.

== Composition ==
Heavily inspired by Todd Rundgren's 1973 album A Wizard, a True Star, Lonerism represents somewhat of a musical departure for Tame Impala. Whilst making Innerspeaker, Parker felt the need to "make an album that was comfortably audible, easily enjoyed, but still smart". However, for the second album, he said, "I surrendered to temptation and desire to make an album that is really fucked up. But I also have a desire to sound like Britney Spears, I love pop music and bad plastics. On the one hand this album is weird and fucked up, but on the other hand it's very pop." After the album was completed Parker later revealed that some of the more indulgent pop moments of the album were removed: "Thankfully, those bits were culled from the final project. The big thing that was difficult to put a lid on was the excessiveness of really cheesy pop things. For whatever reason, I started to become obsessed with pop melodies and pop chord progressions. I fell in love with the disposable-ness of it. Maybe it was because we had suddenly become involved in this indie scene, and a part of my personality was trying to reject whatever environment I was in; we were in love with the idea that people would hate it. We just let ourselves go, doing these six-minute prog-pop pieces." However, Parker said "We still have them; we'll probably make them B-sides."

Parker explained his decision to explore pop elements in Lonerism: "For me I love everything; every kind of element available. I would never do a pop melody just to sell more records or anything. I genuinely love the emotion that a pop song can use to touch me. Pop music is in a way so much more pure than all other types of music – there's no intellectual level; it's just pure feelings."

Fellow Tame Impala member, Jay Watson revealed in an interview that Lonerism has "got lots of synths on it, but it's got lots of everything on it. It's got all the sort of stuff that was on the first one and a whole lot more stuff." Parker had "exhausted [his] love of experimenting with guitar sounds" and wanted to experiment with new equipment. Parker was "at my friend's studio one day and he had this kind of vintage synth. I'd never played one before, and I just put my finger on one of the keys and found this whole unique world in a key...I love finding new ways of making crazy sounds."

Parker also stated that "[Lonerism] will be the kind of music that I felt as though I wanted to make during Innerspeaker, but I felt that it was too much of a jump. Back when I was doing Innerspeaker, I felt like I should make an album with only guitars, and use no synths, because I felt like it was a compromise to what we do. But I now know that it's not." and also describing Innerspeaker as being "pseudo-electronic", and revealing that Lonerism will feature more synths, drum machines and samples. He also said "For me, it's a combination of nice sugary pop crossed with really fucked-up, explosive, cosmic music. It's like Britney Spears singing with The Flaming Lips."

Speaking of the album's "explosiveness" Parker said "With Innerspeaker I was more into melodies that beam at you rather than wash over you. This time, I want the songs to be like waves that hit you rather than you swimming in an ocean of melody."

"Apocalypse Dreams", the first song to be released from Lonerism, shows this change. It features poppy verses featuring piano stabs and a poppy melody. The choruses and outro of the song feature the classic Tame Impala sound, only more lush and expansive, with heavy guitar overdubs and synth effects. "Apocalypse Dreams" was co-written with Tame Impala member Jay Watson, which marks the first time Parker has co-written with another person for Tame Impala. Two songs, "Apocalypse Dreams" and "Elephant", on Lonerism were co-written by Parker and Watson. Parker has "always respected Jay immensely as a songwriter".

Lyrically, Parker views Lonerism as being almost like a prequel to previous album Innerspeaker, stating "[Lonerism is] quite a childish album, almost like a persona who turns into the one from Innerspeaker. That's kinda what I hear anyway". Parker later elaborated "For me it's like the last album was singing about someone who's already blissfully in oblivion, so I was already there. Whereas this album is like the child version of that, someone growing up and discovering other people and just realising their place is not involved with the rest of the world kind of thing. Like discovering that you're a loner." Parker also said that the lyrics are written from a different persona rather than himself and that "It's about the persona of someone who is really isolated – but not necessarily deliberately. Most of the songs are really about other people, being amongst other people. It's really just the idea of being someone who doesn't feel part of the rest of the world, someone trying to figure out where their place amongst everyone else is, and having a really confusing time with it and then slowly accepting that it's in their blood just to be a solitary wanderer. It's meant to put it in a positive light but also a negative light, as the album progresses."

Parker revealed that the album title and general themes of isolation and introspection were selected when "We were touring so much and doing all these gigs and going to places with people. It reminded me of when I was a kid trying to be social and trying to be a people person and realising that I'm not. The last years of touring and me being a people person is just something that's not in my blood. All these cool parties just make me realise I'm just a total outcast. I just can't really talk to anyone without feeling stupid." and "Sometimes I just want to run home and never come out of my bedroom again".

Multiple songs from Lonerism also feature ambient sounds recorded by Parker on his dictaphone, which Parker explained "I obsessively record sounds wherever I am. Like, if I'm at a train station, I'll record the trains or a megaphone talking. I love ambient sounds. For me it's like taking photos. I love the idea of recording a collection or a library of weird sounds of stuff." An example of this is on the track "Keep on Lying", which features a recording of people talking at a party which has been digitally manipulated with delay added. Parker said "it's meant to sound like there's this dinner party going on and there's music playing in the background" and "for me it makes the listener feel even more alienated", which ties in with the theme of isolation. Opening track "Be Above It" also features ambient sounds of a person walking which was recorded on the dictaphone by Parker sticking his recorder out of a window at a hotel he was staying at. Parker recorded this because "The street had a weird shape to it and it had a cool reverb whenever someone walked by. You see that run through the album." Closing track "Sun's Coming Up" has ambient sounds recorded in the second half of the song of Parker "walking from the carpark to my local beach in Perth. You can hear my walking on the tar and then the wind blowing and then finally the water where you can hear waves and a girl talking before it chops off. I guess it's recording my being alone even though I'm not."

In addition to being an influence, Todd Rundgren contributed a remix of the first single, "Elephant", and Tame Impala added a cover of Rundgren's song "International Feel" to their set list.

== Artwork ==
Parker once again selected Australian artist Leif Podhajsky to create the artwork for Lonerism, after he created the artwork for Innerspeaker and its singles. The image for Lonerism was personally taken by Parker with a Diana F camera and edited by Podhajsky; it features an exterior gate of the Luxembourg Garden in Paris. This image ties into the themes of isolation of Lonerism with the gate separating the viewer from the people in the Garden. The light leak in the corner of the image was the result of Parker incorrectly winding the film.

The meaning behind the image was also lost on some people, which Parker went into detail, saying, "I didn't know whether people were going to get what the picture was getting at. Which was great in the end because I love that people can look at that picture and just see a picture of some people and think, 'What's the big deal?', and some people can see the meaning; the separation of the person looking through the fence."

Upon closer inspection there is more going on in the image, Parker explains: "I love the expression of people's faces in this picture. It's kind of this snap shot of life, and the more you examine, if you're going to get the vinyl version, you can really examine what's going on in the picture. There's some guy touching himself, I think, having some kind of fun. He's talking to some girl and he's got his hand on his crotch, and there's a policeman, and there's all this other sort of crazy shit if you look really hard. And the more you examine all these things, the more you realise you're really just perving from the other side of the fence."

The sign on the gate, written in French, translates to "Dogs, even on a leash, are not admitted beyond this point".

== Release ==
On 27 June 2012, Tame Impala uploaded a short trailer for the album, featuring a snippet of the outro to the song "Apocalypse Dreams" set to various video footage shot during Tame Impala's Innerspeaker Tour, and revealing the title to be Lonerism at the end. On 9 July 2012, the entire track "Apocalypse Dreams" was released for free download, showing a poppier side to their psychedelia, and a more lavish and expansive sound. It was also revealed that the first single from Lonerism would be released in late July 2012, entitled "Elephant". On 13 July 2012, details of the new album emerged, including the album artwork and track listing. The release date was also revealed, with Lonerism set to be released on 5 October 2012, in Australia, and worldwide by 9 October 2012. A deluxe edition of Lonerism will follow the regular release, with Tame Impala taking in suggestions from fans about what to include with it. The first official single from Lonerism, "Elephant", was released on 26 July 2012. Parker revealed that "Elephant" "is actually one of the oldest songs that I have, it's just been in the vaults this whole time. I'm not sure why we never recorded it before, but we were just playing it at a sound check one night and everyone in the band was like, 'We should just put this on the album', and so we did." "Elephant" features a bluesier side of Tame Impala, heard more frequently on their EP, as the song was written around that time. Thus "Elephant" is "an anomaly on that album. There are no other songs that have that bluesy riffing. That's kind of why we put out 'Apocalypse Dreams' before 'Elephant', because we didn't really want the first thing to come out to be too misleading. The rest of the album is pretty psychedelic, with melancholy melodies and sounds. I guess it's a lot more like 'Apocalypse Dreams'. But at the same time, 'Apocalypse Dreams' is pretty different as well." On 6 September, the album was leaked.

== Critical reception ==
Professional ratings
Aggregate scores
Source	Rating
AnyDecentMusic?	8.5/10
Metacritic	88/100
Review scores
Source	Rating
AllMusic	5/5 stars
The A.V. Club	A−
The Guardian	5/5 stars
The Irish Times	4/5 stars
Mojo	4/5 stars
NME	9/10
Pitchfork	9.0/10
Q	4/5 stars
Spin	8/10
Uncut	8/10

Lonerism received widespread critical acclaim from music critics. Metacritic, which assigns a normalised rating out of 100 to reviews from mainstream critics, reported an average score of 88, based on 35 reviews, described as "universal acclaim". Lonerism has received critical acclaim from the likes of Pitchfork, NME, Allmusic, and Spin. The album also holds an 8.5 overall rating from the UK-based review aggregator AnyDecentMusic?.

=== Accolades ===
In November 2012, Lonerism won the 2012 J Award for Australian Album of the Year. They also won it for their debut album Innerspeaker in 2010. This makes them the first band to have won the J Award more than once, and the first band to have won a J Award for every album that they have ever released. They followed this achievement up in January 2013 by winning the Rolling Stone Australia award for 2012 Album of the Year again, after they also won it the previous year for Innerspeaker. Lonerism was ranked as the best album of 2012 by Rolling Stone Australia, Triple J, NME, Filter, Urban Outfitters, FasterLouder and Obscure Sound's 2012 Album of the Year polls. The album was nominated for Best Alternative Music Album at the 56th Annual Grammy Awards. The album was recognized as the 7th Best Album of the Decade So Far by Pitchfork in August 2014.

=== Year-end lists ===
Publication	Country	Accolade	Year	Rank
Triple J	AUS	2012 Album of the Year J Award	2012	1
NME	UK	50 Best Albums of 2012	2012	1
Rolling Stone	AUS	2012 Album of the Year Award	2012	1
Filter	US	Top 10 Albums of 2012	2012	1
Urban Outfitters	US	2012 Album of the Year	2012	1
Chicago Sun-Times	US	Best of 2012: 20 Overall Albums	2012	2
musicOMH	UK	100 Best Albums of 2012	2012	2
Chicago Tribune	US	Top 10 Albums of 2012	2012	3
Pitchfork	US	Top 50 Albums of 2012	2012	4
The Canadian Press	CA	Canadian Press' Top Songs and Albums of 2012	2012	4
The Guardian	UK	The Best Albums of 2012	2012	6
Virgin Records	UK	Top 20 Albums of 2012	2012	6
Pitchfork	US	The 100 Best Albums of the Decade So Far (2010–2014)	2014	7
PopMatters	US	The Best 75 Albums of 2012	2012	7
The Fly	UK	The Top 50 Albums of 2012	2012	10
Stereogum	US	The Top 50 Albums of 2012	2012	11
Uncut	UK	The Top 75 Albums of 2012	2012	11
Mojo	UK	The Top 20 Albums of 2012	2012	12
AllMusic	US	The Top 50 Albums of 2012	2012	13
Clash	UK	The Top 40 Albums of 2012	2012	13
Paste	US	The 50 Best Albums of 2012	2012	16
BBC	UK	BBC Music's Top 25 Albums of 2012	2012	21
Spin	US	Spin's 50 Best Albums of 2012	2012	26
Complex	US	Top 50 Best Albums of 2012	2012	37
Tiny Mix Tapes	US	Favorite 50 Albums of 2012	2012	37
Consequence of Sound	US	Top 50 Albums of 2012	2012	41

== Commercial performance ==
In the United States, Lonerism debuted at number 34 on the Billboard 200, selling 12,000 copies in its first week. In total, it has sold 210,000 copies to date in the US.

== Track listing ==
All tracks are written by Kevin Parker; "Apocalypse Dreams" and "Elephant" co-written by Jay Watson.

No.	Title	Length
1.	"Be Above It"	3:21
2.	"Endors Toi"	3:06
3.	"Apocalypse Dreams"	5:56
4.	"Mind Mischief"	4:31
5.	"Music to Walk Home By"	5:12
6.	"Why Won't They Talk to Me?"	4:46
7.	"Feels Like We Only Go Backwards"	3:12
8.	"Keep on Lying"	5:54
9.	"Elephant"	3:31
10.	"She Just Won't Believe Me"	0:57
11.	"Nothing That Has Happened So Far Has Been Anything We Could Control"	6:01
12.	"Sun's Coming Up"	5:20
Total length:		51:53

Bonus tracks
No.	Title	Length
13.	"Led Zeppelin" (iTunes bonus track†)	3:08
14.	"Beverly Laurel" (Deluxe edition bonus track†)	3:07

Notes
† The iTunes version has "Led Zeppelin" as the 10th of its 13 tracks, between "Elephant" and "She Just Won't Believe Me". It is also available with the deluxe edition of Lonerism on 7-inch vinyl.

† "Beverly Laurel" is available with the deluxe edition of Lonerism on 7-inch vinyl. It is also available for streaming on Spotify and Apple Music.

Lonerism - B-Sides & Remixes
No.	Title	Length
1.	"Beverly Laurel"	3:10
2.	"Be Above It (Erol Alkan Rework)"	7:43
3.	"Mind Mischief (The Field Remix)"	10:47
4.	"Elephant (Todd Rundgren Remix)"	5:39
5.	"Elephant (Canyons Wooly Mammoth Extension)"	7:19
Total length:		34:38

Lonerism 10th Anniversary Edition
No.	Title	Length
13.	"Retina Show" (Unreleased Demo)	5:22
14.	"Sidetracked Soundtrack" (Unreleased Demo)	4:19
15.	"Assorted Sketches, 2010-2012"	19:09
Total length:		80:25

== Personnel ==
Tame Impala

- Kevin Parker – production, recording; all vocals and instruments; cover photo

Additional musicians

- Jay Watson – writer, piano and keys (tracks 3, 9) drums (track 9)
- Melody Prochet – spoken word (track 11)

Production

- Dave Fridmann – mixing
- Greg Calbi – mastering
- Leif Podhajsky – artwork and layout
- Matthew C. Saville – studio photography

== Charts ==
=== Weekly charts ===
2012 weekly chart performance for Lonerism
Chart (2012)	Peak position
Australian Albums (ARIA)	4
Australian Artist Albums (ARIA)	1
Belgian Albums (Ultratop Flanders)	38
Belgian Albums (Ultratop Wallonia)	62
French Albums (SNEP)	106
Irish Albums (IRMA)	39
Italian Albums (FIMI)	72
New Zealand Albums (RMNZ)	34
Norwegian Albums (VG-lista)	27
Scottish Albums (Official Charts)	18
Swedish Albums (Sverigetopplistan)	50
Swiss Albums (Schweizer Hitparade)	60
UK Albums (Official Charts)	14
UK Independent Albums (Official Charts)	4
US Billboard 200	34
US Independent Albums (Billboard)	8
US Top Alternative Albums (Billboard)	10
US Top Rock Albums (Billboard)	14
US Indie Store Album Sales (Billboard)	5

2015 weekly chart performance for Lonerism
Chart (2015)	Peak position
Dutch Albums (Album Top 100)	45

2022–2026 weekly chart performance for Lonerism
Chart (2022–2026)	Peak position
Greek Albums (IFPI)	7
Portuguese Albums (AFP)	177
UK Progressive Albums (Official Charts)	5

=== Year-end charts ===
2012 year-end chart performance for Lonerism
Chart (2012)	Position
Australian Albums (ARIA)	94

2013 year-end chart performance for Lonerism
Chart (2013)	Position
Australian Albums (ARIA)	90
US Independent Albums (Billboard)	35

== Certifications ==
Certifications for Lonerism
Region	Certification	Certified units/sales
Australia (ARIA)	Platinum	70,000^{^}
Canada (Music Canada)	Gold	40,000^{‡}
New Zealand (RMNZ)	Platinum	15,000^{‡}
United Kingdom (BPI)	Gold	100,000^{‡}
^{^} Shipments figures based on certification alone.^{‡} Sales+streaming figures based on certification alone.

== Awards ==
Year	Award	Category	Nominee(s)	Result	Ref.
2012	J Awards	Australian Album of the Year	Lonerism	Won	
2012	EG Music Awards	Best Song	"Elephant"	Won	
2013	Grammy Awards	Best Alternative Music Album	Lonerism	Nominated	
2013	Rolling Stone Australia Awards	Album of the Year	Lonerism	Won	
2013	APRA Awards	APRA Song of the Year	"Feels Like We Only Go Backwards"	Won	
2013	APRA Awards	APRA Song of the Year	"Elephant"	Nominated	
2013	ARIA Awards	Album of the Year	Lonerism	Won	
2013	ARIA Awards	Best Rock Album	Lonerism	Won	
2013	ARIA Awards	Best Group	Lonerism	Won	
2013	ARIA Awards	Best Australian Live Act	Lonerism Tour	Nominated	
