= Wednesday Campanella discography =

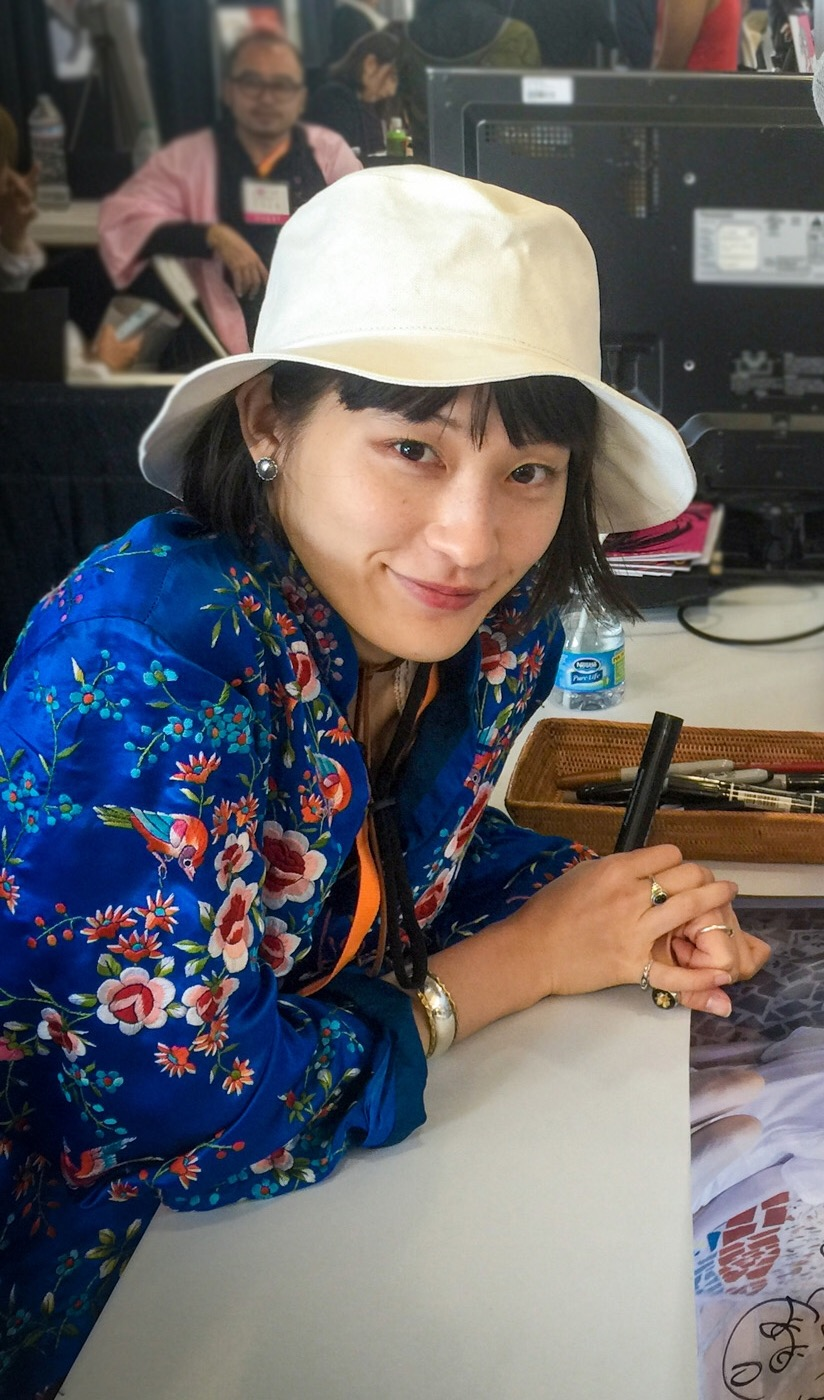
- Wednesday Campanella's KOM_I signing autographs at J-POP Summit 2016.
- Studio albums: 2
- EPs: 18
- Soundtrack albums: 1
- Singles: 11

The discography of Wednesday Campanella contains 2 studio albums, 1 soundtrack, 18 extended plays (including compilation extended plays), and 11 singles.

== Studio albums ==
List of albums, with selected chart positions
Title	Album details	Peak positions	
Title	Album details	JPN Oricon	JPN Billboard (Note: Sources for chart positions are as follows: Zipangu, UMA, Superman, Galapagos, Neon and Rabbit Star, Pop Delivery.)
Zipangu (ジパング)	Released: November 11, 2015; Label: Tsubasa Records; Formats: CD, digital download	11	16
Superman	Released: February 8, 2017; Label: Warner Music Japan; Formats: CD, digital download, USB	9	7

== Soundtracks ==
List of soundtracks performed by Wednesday Campanella
Title	Album details
Neko wa Daku Mono (Original Soundtrack) (猫は抱くもの（オリジナルサウンドトラック）)	Released: June 22, 2018; Label: Warner; Formats: digital download

== Extended plays ==
List of extended plays, with selected chart positions
Title	EP details	Peak positions	
Title	EP details	JPN Oricon (Note: Additional sources for chart positions are as follows: Rashōmon, Cinema Jack, Watashi o Onigashima ni Tsuretette.)	JPN Billboard
Suiyōbi no Campanella Demo (水曜日のカンパネラdemo)	Released: November 10, 2012; Label: Independent; Formats: CD	—	—
Crawl to Sakaagari (クロールと逆上がり; "Crawl and Back Hip Circle")	Released: May 15, 2013; Label: Tsubasa Records; Formats: CD, digital download	—	—
Norway no Mori (ノルウェイの盛り)	Released: May 15, 2013; Label: Tsubasa Records; Formats: digital download	—	—
Suiyōbi no Campanella Demo 2 (水曜日のカンパネラdemo2)	Released: May 18, 2013; Label: Independent; Formats: CD	—	—
Rashōmon (羅生門)	Released: October 9, 2013; Label: Tsubasa Records; Formats: CD, digital download	—	— (Note: Charted at number 47 on the Top Independent Albums and Singles chart.)
Cinema Jack (シネマジャック)	Released: March 19, 2014; Label: Tsubasa Records; Formats: CD, digital download	136	—
Watashi o Onigashima ni Tsuretette (私を鬼ヶ島に連れてって; "Take Me to the Island of the Ogres")	Released: October 29, 2014; Label: Tsubasa Records; Formats: CD, digital download	34	— (Note: Charted at number 22 on the Top Albums Sales chart, and number 6 on the Top Independent Albums and Singles chart.)
Anmin Dōfu (安眠豆腐)	Cover EP; Released: November 5, 2014; Label: Tsubasa Records; Formats: CD, digital download	—	—
Triathlon (トライアスロン)	Released: April 1, 2015; Label: Tsubasa Records; Formats: CD, digital download, record	23 (Note: Charted on the Oricon singles chart.)	— (Note: Charted at number 25 on the Top Albums Sales chart, and number 4 on the Top Independent Albums and Singles chart.)
UMA	Released: June 22, 2016; Label: Warner; Formats: CD, digital download	12	10
Galapagos (ガラパゴス)	Released: June 27, 2018; Label: Warner; Formats: CD, LP record, digital download	28	27
Neon (ネオン)	Released: May 25, 2022; Label: Warner; Formats: CD, digital download, streaming	12	12
Rabbit Star	Released: May 3, 2023; Label: Warner; Formats: CD, digital download, streaming	14	11
Pop Delivery	Released: June 5, 2024; Label: Warner; Formats: CD, digital download, streaming	23	13
Kawaii Joshi (可愛女子)	Released: September 24, 2025; Label: Warner; Formats: CD, digital download, streaming	36	—
"—" denotes items which were ineligible to chart, or charted on a Billboard sub-chart.

=== Compilation extended plays ===
List of extended plays
Title	Album details
Tsutaya Rental-ban 1 (ツタヤレンタル盤1; "Tsutaya Rental Disc 1")	Released: August 26, 2015; Label: Tsubasa Records; Formats: rental CD
Tsutaya Rental-ban 2 (ツタヤレンタル盤2; "Tsutaya Rental Disc 2")	Released: August 26, 2015; Label: Tsubasa Records; Formats: rental CD
Jugem' je t'aime (寿限無ジュテーム)	Released: December 18, 2015; Label: Specific Recordings / Allegori Music / Tsubasa Records; Formats: LP

== Singles ==
=== As a lead artist ===
List of singles, with selected chart positions
Title	Year	Peak chart positions		Certifications	Album
Title	Year	JPN Oricon (Note: Additional sources for chart positions are as follows: "Mitsuko", "Momotarō",)	JPN Billboard (Note: Sources for chart positions are as follows: "Momotarō", "Tsuchinoko", "Aladdin", "Ikkyū-san", "Melos", "Edison".)	Certifications	Album
"Mothra" (モスラ)	2013	—	—		Cinema Jack
"Raoh" (ラオウ)	2013	—	—		Cinema Jack
"Mitsuko" (ミツコ) (Note: Originally released as a digital single in November 2013, the song was released on CD as Suiyōbi no Campanella Demo 4 with the song "Nikaidō Mari" (二階堂マリ), and was used as the leading promotional song from Cinema Jack in February 2014)	2013	68	—		Cinema Jack
"Nikita" (ニキータ)	2014	—	—		Cinema Jack
"Chupacabra" (チュパカブラ)	2016	—	— (Note: The song charted at number 62 on the Billboard Radio Songs chart.)		UMA
Superkid (Note: A digital maxi single featuring the songs "Aladdin" and "Kamehameha Daiō", and additionally "Matsuo Bashō" on the iTunes release.)	2016	—	—		Superman
"Ikkyū-san" (一休さん)	2017	—	36		Superman
"Melos" (メロス)	2017	—	98		Galapagos
"Eisei" (嬴政)	2017	—	— (Note: The song charted at number 76 on the Billboard Radio Songs chart.)		Non-album single
"Picasso" (ピカソ)	2017	—	—		Galapagos
"Gala" (ガラ)	2017	—	—		Non-album single
"Alice" (アリス)	2021	—	—		Neon
"Buckingham" (バッキンガム)	2021	—	—		Neon
"Maneki Neko" (招き猫)	2022	—	—		Neon
"Edison" (エジソン)	2022	—	17	RIAJ: Gold (streaming)	Neon
"Tinkerbell" (ティンカーベル)	2022	—	—		Non-album singles
"Nabe Bukyō" (鍋奉行)	2022	—	—		Non-album singles
"—" denotes items that were ineligible to chart on Oricon singles chart, or items that did not chart.

=== As a featured artist ===
Title	Year	Album
"Out of My Head" (Chvrches featuring Wednesday Campanella)	2018	Love Is Dead: Japan Deluxe Edition

== Promotional singles ==
List of singles, with selected chart positions
Title	Year	Peak chart positions		Album
Title	Year	JPN Oricon	JPN Billboard	Album
"Marie Antoinette" (マリー・アントワネット) (Note: Originally released on CD as Suiyōbi no Campanella Demo 3 in August 2013 with the song "Char" (シャア, Shā), "Marie Antoinette" was also the leading promotional song from Rashōmon in October.)	2013	—	—	Rashōmon
"Kungfu Lady" (カンフー・レディー)	2014	—	—	Anmin Dōfu
"Momotarō" (桃太郎) (Note: Originally released on CD as Suiyōbi no Campanella Demo 5 in September 2014 with the song "Sen no Rikyū" (千利休), "Momotarō" was also the leading promotional song from Watashi o Onigashima ni Tsuretette in November.)	2014	53	79	Watashi o Onigashima ni Tsuretette
"Napoleon" (ナポレオン)	2014	—	— (Note: The song charted at number 89 on the Billboard Radio Songs chart.)	Triathlon
"Shakushain" (シャクシャイン) (Note: Released as Suiyōbi no Campanella Demo 6, a single track CD, in April 2015.)	2014	—	—	Zipangu
"Twiggy" (ツイッギー) (Note: Released as Suiyōbi no Campanella Demo 7, a single track CD, in July 2015.)	2014	—	—	Zipangu
"Ra" (ラー)	2014	—	—	Zipangu
"Tsuchinoko" (ツチノコ)	2016	—	74	UMA
"Matsuo Bashō" (松尾芭蕉)	2016	—	— (Note: The song charted at number 36 on the Billboard Radio Songs chart.)	Superkid (single)
"Aladdin" (アラジン)	2016	—	57	Superkid (single) / Superman
"Ama no Uzume" (アマノウズメ)	2017	—	— (Note: The song charted at number 91 on the Billboard Radio Songs chart.)	Superman
"Audrey" (オードリー)	2017	—	— (Note: The song charted at number 51 on the Billboard Radio Songs chart.)	Superman
"Edokko Doko Doko" (江戸っ子どこどこ)	2018	—	—	Non-album single
"Mizaru Kikazaru Iwazaru" (見ざる聞かざる言わざる; "See No Evil, Hear No Evil, Speak No Evil")	2018	—	—	Galapagos
"Matryoshka" (マトリョーシカ) (Wednesday Campanella & Moodoïd)	2018	—	—	Galapagos
"Kaguya-hime" (かぐや姫)	2018	—	—	Galapagos
"Langage" (Moodoïd & Wednesday Campanella)	2018	—	—	Cité Champagne
"Orihime" (織姫)	2022	—	—	Neon
"Himiko" (卑弥呼)	2022	—	—	Neon
"—" denotes items that were ineligible to chart on Oricon singles chart, or items that did not chart.

== Guest appearances ==
Title	Year	Other artists	Album
"Tiny Tea Room"	2019	Ryan Hemsworth	Tiny Tea Room (single)
"Fullmoon Lullaby"	2021	Porter Robinson	Nurture
