= I Can't Lose =

I Can't Lose may refer to:

- "I Can't Lose" (Jonas Brothers song), 2025
- "I Can't Lose" (Mark Ronson song), 2015
