= Bon Voyage (Melody's Echo Chamber album) =

Studio album by Melody's Echo Chamber
- Released: 15 June 2018
- Genre: Psychedelic pop; tropicália
- Length: 33:17
- Label: Domino; Fat Possum
- Producer: Melody Prochet, Fredrik Swahn and Reine Fiske

Melody's Echo Chamber chronology
Melody's Echo Chamber (2012)	Bon Voyage (2018)	Emotional Eternal (2022)

Singles from Bon Voyage
- 1. "Shirim" Released: 15 October 2014; 2. "Cross My Heart" Released: 5 April 2017; 3. "Breathe In, Breathe Out" Released: 3 April 2018; 4. "Desert Horse" Released: 15 May 2018

Bon Voyage is the second studio album by French psychedelic pop band Melody's Echo Chamber. Released on 15 June 2018 on Fat Possum Records, the album is a collaboration between Melody Prochet and members of the Swedish psychedelic rock band Dungen.

Originally slated to be released in the spring of 2017, Bon Voyage was pushed back a year due to Prochet's suffering a brain aneurysm and broken vertebrae from an unspecified accident, which resulted in her being in the hospital for several months.

== Background ==
Bon Voyage was produced in Solna by Melody Protchet, Reine Fiske of Dungen, and Fredrik Swahn after Protchet's move to nearby Bagarmossen, Sweden. Both Flying Lotus and Tyler, the Creator reached out to Protchet, with Flying Lotus letting her record demos in his Los Angeles studio, but Protchet ultimately ended up moving to Bagarmossen instead to record with Fiske and Swahn.

Plans for a second studio album date back to late 2014, when Melody Prochet released "Shirim". Originally slated to be released in 2017, with "Cross My Heart" being released in April of that year, the album was delayed due to Prochet suffering a "serious accident" earlier in June; her then-upcoming tour was cancelled.

The album was formally announced on 3 April 2018, with lead single "Breathe In, Breathe Out" being released along with an accompanying music video. Prochet wrote that she was "enchanted" to share the music video, describing it as a "little animated fable" and thanking "Daniel Foothead and Team". In a positive review of the track, Larry Fitzmaurice of Pitchfork described the song as having "stop-start melodic breaks" and "a jarring conclusion", and commented that the song is "packed with ideas" and leaves listeners "wondering what comes next". The track was featured as song of the day on Minnesota Public Radio, the Minnesota affiliate of the U.S.-based National Public Radio, on 1 May 2018.

== Reception ==
Professional ratings
Aggregate scores
Source	Rating
AnyDecentMusic?	7.5/10
Metacritic	77/100
Review scores
Source	Rating
AllMusic	4.5/5 stars
The A.V. Club	B+
Chicago Tribune	3/4 stars
DIY	4/5 stars
The Guardian	3/5 stars
The Independent	3/5 stars
Mojo	4/5 stars
NME	3/5 stars
Pitchfork	7.1/10
Uncut	9/10

At Metacritic, which assigns a normalised rating out of 100 to reviews from mainstream critics, Bon Voyage received an average score of 77, based on 17 reviews, indicating "generally favorable reviews". The album also received a 7.5 aggregate on AnyDecentMusic?.

Writing for AllMusic, Tim Sendra stated that the album demonstrates that the band is "far from […] just a Kevin Parker creation" and that "Prochet's vision is her own, […] strong enough here to fly free of any and all constraints". Chicago Tribune writer Greg Kot praised the album's composition, describing Bon Voyage as "even stranger" than the band's debut, with each of its songs "splashed in psychedelic colors".

While Rachel Aroesti of The Guardian felt that the album's "restless experimentalism" failed to establish "a strong personality to anchor it", Keiron Tyler of Mojo praised the album's experimentation and diversity of influences, with Tyler drawing comparisons to the work of Tropicália artists such as Os Mutantes and Tom Zé and noting the album's "singular appeal".

== Track listing ==
All lyrics are written by Melody Prochet, except "Var har du vart?" by Gustav Ejstes.

No.	Title	Writer(s)	Length
1.	"Cross My Heart"	Melody Prochet, Fredrik Swan, Reine Fiske	6:55
2.	"Breathe In, Breathe Out"	Prochet	2:50
3.	"Desert Horse"	Prochet, Swan, Fiske	5:15
4.	"Var har du vart?"	Gustav Ejstes	1:28
5.	"Quand les larmes d'un ange font danser la neige"	Prochet, Swan, Fiske, Mattias Gustavsson, David Svedmyr, Johan Holmegard, Nicholas Allbrook	7:07
6.	"Visions of Someone Special, on a Wall of Reflections"	Prochet, Swan, Fiske	4:55
7.	"Shirim"	Prochet	4:47
Total length:			33:17

== Personnel ==
All personnel credits adapted from album liner notes

- Melody Prochet – vocals (all tracks), drums (tracks 1–3), keyboards (tracks 2, 3, 5), electric guitar (tracks 2, 6), violin (tracks 5 and 6), all instruments (track 7), production (all tracks except 4), mixing (tracks 2, 6)
- Fredrik Swahn – keyboards (tracks 1, 5), bass guitar (track 2), sound engineering (tracks 1–3, 5, 6), production (all tracks except 7), mixing (tracks 2, 4–6)
- Reine Fiske – guitars (tracks 1, 3, 5, 6), bass guitar (tracks 1, 3, 5, 6), keyboards (tracks 1 and 2), drums (tracks 2 and 3), percussion (tracks 2, 3, 6), violin (track 3, 6), production (tracks 1–3, 5, 6), mixing (tracks 2, 5, 6)
- Gustav Ejstes – piano (track 2), beatbox (track 3), scream (track 3), percussion (track 3), vocals (track 4), guitar (track 4), organ (track 6)
- Johan Holmegard – drums (tracks 5 and 6)
- Nicholas Allbrook – spoken word (track 5)
- Maxime Leguil – mixing (tracks 1, 3)
- Raphael Jonin – mastering (all tracks)
- Silly Jane – artwork
- Paul J. Street, Matthew Cooper – design

== Release history ==
Region	Date	Label	Format(s)	Catalog
United Kingdom	15 June 2018	Domino	CD	WIG427
United Kingdom	15 June 2018	Domino	LP	WIG427
United States	15 June 2018	Fat Possum	CD	16541
United States	15 June 2018	Fat Possum	LP	16542
United States	15 June 2018	Fat Possum	Digital download	16543
