= Sarah McDaniel =

American model

- Born: Sarah Rose McDaniel; 1995 or 1996 (age 30–31); Roseville, California, U.S.
- Occupations: Model, actress
- Years active: 2013–present
- Modeling information
- Hair color: Brown
- Agency: L.A. Models (former)

Sarah Rose McDaniel is an American model. She appeared in the music video for Mark Ronson and Kevin Parker's songs "Summer Breaking" and "Daffodils", and was the cover girl for Playboy magazine's first non-nude issue in March 2016.

== Early life ==
McDaniel was born in Roseville, California.

== Career ==
McDaniel was on the cover of Playboy's first non-nude issue for March 2016. She has also appeared as a guest on The Late Show with Stephen Colbert, where a minor wardrobe failure caused McDaniel to have to visibly cover her cleavage. Colbert attempted to joke about the situation to ease the awkwardness, and at one point playfully put a paper towel on her chest, a move McDaniel later criticized in an interview with HasanAbi. She described the entire incident as one of the worst moments of her life. A clip of the interview posted on YouTube has more than 49 million views and is one of the most watched videos ever posted to The Late Show YouTube channel, as of 2025.

McDaniel has appeared in several music videos, first in the video for Mark Ronson's "Summer Breaking / Daffodils" featuring Kevin Parker. Her second appearance was for G-Eazy's single "Some Kind of Drug" featuring Marc E. Bassy. She made her acting debut in Edouard Pluvieux's series SuperHigh, starring alongside Kev Adams and DeStorm.

She has also done some work as a journalist. McDaniel wrote science-based entries on Filthy and Huffington Post. Her blogs covered emotion-changing parasites, zombie fungus, and black holes.

== Heterochromia ==
McDaniel states that her heterochromia iridum appeared a few weeks after she was born, with her right eye brown and her left eye blue. She has stated in interviews that a previous agent and different modeling companies wanted to have her wear colored contacts in an effort to focus more on the design, and McDaniel highlights social media for her embracing her look.

However, McDaniel's father has come out with statements saying her heterochromia iridum is fake. McDaniel insists that she does have heterochromia and has been "devastated by the accusation" and the online abuse she has received. Photographs of McDaniel's posted online (including some by her father) "seemed to show the color of McDaniel’s blue eye changing, from blue-green dappled with brown, turquoise with a brown ring around the pupil, to solid aquamarine with a black ring at the perimeter".
