= Melody's Echo Chamber (album) =

2012 album by Melody's Echo Chamber

Studio album by Melody's Echo Chamber
- Released: 25 September 2012
- Recorded: 2011–2012
- Studio: Jetlag Studio, Perth; Australia & Jardin des Abeilles, Cavalaire-sur-Mer, France
- Genre: Psychedelic pop; dream pop; neo-psychedelia; psychedelic rock; space rock; shoegaze
- Length: 44:33
- Label: Weird World; Fat Possum
- Producer: Kevin Parker

Melody's Echo Chamber chronology
Melody's Echo Chamber (2012)	Bon Voyage (2018)

Singles from Melody's Echo Chamber
- 1. "Endless Shore" Released: 17 August 2012; 2. "I Follow You" Released: 5 September 2012; 3. "Crystallized" Released: 18 March 2013; 4. "Some Time Alone, Alone" Released: 1 July 2013

Melody's Echo Chamber is the debut studio album by French musician Melody Prochet, under her project name Melody's Echo Chamber. It was released on 25 September 2012 on Weird World Record Co and Fat Possum Records. It received generally favorable reviews from critics who praised Prochet's efforts for her debut and also Kevin Parker's role in production. She supported the album's release with a tour that followed in North America, France and the United Kingdom and all of Europe.

A compilation containing recording sessions for a scrapped sophomore album titled Unfold was released on 30 September 2022 to coincide with the 10th anniversary of the album.

== Musical style ==
Speaking of the album's production, Melody Prochet wanted the tracks to be out of her comfort zone: "I tend to write songs with pretty chords and arpeggios, and I was kind of boring myself", she then had her producer Kevin Parker of Tame Impala "destroy everything" and "put it back together piece by piece." James Skinner of BBC Music said that this method resulted in "something that’s often otherworldly: washed-out and languid, frayed edges combining to create a beguiling whole; fuzzy arpeggios ringing out over washes of synth and electronica, electric guitars and live drums." Jon Parales termed the music as both neo-psychedelia and French pop and also considered the album an "anachronistic daydream of loops and live instruments." He continued that it has "vintage drum samples and shoegazer distortion, string sections and abstract sounds running forward and backward."

== Release ==
Melody's Echo Chamber was released on 25 September 2012 on Fat Possum Records in the United States, 17 October on Hostess Entertainment in Japan and 5 November on Weird World Record Co in Europe. The album was originally issued on CD, LP and as a digital download, and a limited-edition reissue on cassette was released on Burger Records in the US in November 2014.

Four singles were released from Melody's Echo Chamber. "Endless Shore" was released on 17 August 2012; "I Follow You" was released on 5 September 2012; "Crystallized" was released on 18 March 2013; and "Some Time Alone, Alone" was released on 1 July 2013. "Crystallized" had previously been featured on a split 7-inch single that preceded the album's release, which included a cover of the album track "Endless Shore" by Unknown Mortal Orchestra; the single was released in the US in July 2012. The standalone digital release in 2013 featured the B-side "Je Me Perds de Vue", a song which appeared "reversed and warped" on Melody's Echo Chamber as "IsThatWhatYouSaid", and which had since been restored.

In support of the album's release in the US Melody's Echo Chamber announced a 16-date North American tour opening for The Raveonettes. The tour began on 21 September 2012 in Portland, Oregon and concluded on 12 October in San Francisco, California. The band's first ever headline show was held at Cargo in London, England on 6 November, prior to a 14-date French and UK tour that took place from 8 December 2012 to 5 March 2013. A full European tour with Tame Impala subsequently took place over an eight-month period from April to December 2013 and included performances at various festivals, including Printemps de Bourges in France, Hultsfred Festival in Sweden, Primavera Sound in Portugal and Spain, and All Tomorrow's Parties in England.

Following the album's release, the press focused solely on Parker's contributions, particularly around the album's similarities to Tame Impala instead of Prochet's own work. She commented that "[Parker] never acknowledged it and didn’t do anything to protect me or my work."

== Reception ==
Professional ratings
Aggregate scores
Source	Rating
Metacritic	79/100
Review scores
Source	Rating
AllMusic	4/5 stars
Consequence of Sound	C+
DIY	7/10
Drowned in Sound	9/10
Mojo	4/5 stars
NME	8/10
The Observer	3/5 stars
Pitchfork Media	7.4/10
PopMatters	7/10 discs
Under the Radar	7/10 stars

At Metacritic, which assigns a normalised rating out of 100 to reviews from mainstream critics, Melody's Echo Chamber received an average score of 79, based on 19 reviews, indicating "generally favorable reviews". AllMusic reviewer Tim Sendra praised Melody Prochet's "lovely singing and evocative songwriting" and Kevin Parker's "inspired production", writing that "the perfect balance the duo strikes between pop and art makes Melody's Echo Chamber a rather stunning debut." In a review for Consequence of Sound, Frank Mojica said that "the album is akin to an Inception-style dream within a dream, where there's a risk of never waking, instead remaining trapped in limbo. While some albums evoke a dream-like state, Melody's Echo Chamber ensnares the listener into its elegant wilderness, not wanting to let go". Mojica also drew comparisons between the album's material and releases from Air and M83.

Writing for DIY, Dean Lucas praised Parker's production, though wrote that "[Parker's] degree of influence could easily be overstated, as it's not the song writing that shows his presence… Prochet merely uses Parker's colours to paint an entirely different picture". In a review for Drowned in Sound, Dom Gourlay said that "while there are comparisons to be made with artists of [shoegazing] both old and new, Melody's Echo Chamber has much more to offer than being a mere revisionist exercise". Gourlay also noted similarities to Kevin Shields and My Bloody Valentine's Loveless with Parker's production, and added that "the future possibilities for [Prochet] and Melody's Echo Chamber are endless … they've conjured up one of 2012's… finest debuts."

Mojo summarised Melody's Echo Chamber as "[a] luscious layercake of flange and Echoplex." NME writer Gavin Haynes compared Melody's Echo Chamber to several artists, including Stereolab, Broadcast and the Cocteau Twins in his review and said that "when Melody's light-saturated first single 'Crystallized' rolled into our Twitter feeds back in March, it was easy to dismiss the shimmery-shiny song as standard blog-bait. But Melody’s Echo Chamber manages to create something just as dark as it is light." While Skinner believed "It would have been interesting to see what form Prochet’s songs might have taken had she and Parker not deconstructed them so thoroughly", he called the album a "bold, expressive debut". Some reviewers were critical of the album's latter half, With Jordan Blum of PopMatters writing that its "synthesis of 1960s hippie female songwriters and eccentric production masters… gets a bit repetitive by the end, but it's almost indisputable to say that Prochet offers some charismatic melodies … and interesting sounds along the way".

== Track listing ==
All tracks are written by Melody Prochet.

No.	Title	Length
1.	"I Follow You"	3:36
2.	"Crystallized"	4:01
3.	"You Won't Be Missing That Part of Me"	4:16
4.	"Some Time Alone, Alone"	3:46
5.	"Bisou magique"	4:09
6.	"Endless Shore"	4:56
7.	"Quand vas tu rentrer?"	4:21
8.	"Mount Hopeless"	4:32
9.	"IsThatWhatYouSaid"	2:30
10.	"Snowcapped Andes Crash"	5:15
11.	"Be Proud of Your Kids"	3:11
Total length:		44:33

== Personnel ==
All personnel credits adapted from Melody's Echo Chamber's album notes.

- Melody Prochet – instrumentation
- Kevin Parker – instrumentation; production, mixing
- Jérôme Pichon – guitar on "Crystallized"
- Zelda Coutureau – special guest appearance on "Be Proud of Your Kids"
- Rob Grant – mastering
- Diane Sagnier – photos
- Tony Gaglio – artwork's texture
- B. Seavers – design

== Chart positions ==
Chart (2012)	Peak position
UK Independent Album Breakers Chart	16
US Billboard Heatseeker Albums Chart	61

== Release history ==
Region	Date	Format(s)	Label	Catalogue
United States	25 September 2012	CD, LP, digital download	Fat Possum	FP1279
Japan	17 October 2012	CD, digital download	Hostess Entertainment	HSE-60134
Europe	5 November 2012	CD, LP, digital download	Weird World	WEIRD019
United States	26 November 2014	Cassette	Burger	BRGR594

== Unfold ==
Unfold

Compilation album by Melody's Echo Chamber
- Released: 30 September 2022
- Recorded: 2013
- Studio: Barnett Street and Norfolk Hotel's basement (Fremantle, Perth)
- Genre: Psychedelia
- Length: 20:32
- Label: Fat Possum
- Producer: Melody Prochet; Kevin Parker

Melody's Echo Chamber chronology
Emotional Eternal (2022)	Unfold (2022)	Unclouded (2025)

Singles from Unfold
- 1. "Unfold" Released: 23 August 2022; 2. "Norfolk Hotel" Released: 27 September 2022

The accompanying compilation album Unfold was released on 30 September 2022, to coincide with the 10th anniversary of Melody's Echo Chamber, originally intended as her sophomore album. The title track, "Unfold", was released on 23 August 2022.

=== Background ===
Prochet began writing tracks for Unfold while on tour during 2012, then began recording in Australia with Parker in 2013 and continued sessions in France, with "fifty percent completed". However, the album was conceived during a difficult period for Prochet, as she and Parker ended their relationship. She was unable to complete it on her own and with other musicians, and the album was scrapped, with much of the material reported to have been deleted. The surviving tracks had been reconstructed for the compilation, some of which were previously uploaded in 2016 by Prochet under the title From Pink They Fell Into Blue.

=== Critical reception ===
Professional ratings
Review scores
Source	Rating
AllMusic	4/5 stars

Tim Sendra of AllMusic wrote that "Unfold serves as a wonderfully hypnotic and spacey bridge between Melody Prochet's debut LP and her later work like the near-perfect psychedelic epic Bon Voyage… While she and Parker made a good team, it's clear she had some exploring to do on her own, and this was an important first step."

=== Track listing ===
All tracks are written by Melody Prochet.

Unfold track listing
No.	Title	Length
1.	"Pêcheuse de Lune"	3:35
2.	"Ocean Road"	2:40
3.	"Norfolk Hotel"	4:34
4.	"Unfold"	1:30
5.	"From Pink They Fell into Blue"	3:45
6.	"Pieces of Sound"	0:41
7.	"The Cure"	3:43
Total length:		20:32

=== Personnel ===
Credits adapted from liner notes.

- Melody Prochet - production and mixing
- Kevin Parker - production and mixing
- Matt Colton - mastering
- Thibaut Javoy - mixing (tracks 1, 4, 5)
- Matt Saville - artwork
- Matthew Cooper - layout
