= Feel Right (Mark Ronson song) =

Single by Mark Ronson featuring Mystikal

from the album Uptown Special
- A-side: "Uptown Funk"
- Released: 29 March 2015
- Recorded: 2015
- Genre: Funk; hip hop; deep funk
- Length: 3:42
- Label: RCA
- Songwriters: Mark Ronson; Michael Tyler; Homer Steinweiss; Thomas Brenneck; Peter Hernandez; Philip Lawrence; Nick Movshon; Brody Brown
- Producers: Mark Ronson; Jeff Bhasker; Bruno Mars; Boys Noize

Mark Ronson singles chronology
"Daffodils" (2015)	"Feel Right" (2015)	"Everyday" (2015)

Mystikal singles chronology
"Oochie Pop" (2004)	"Feel Right" (2015)	"Just a Lil' Thick (She Juicy)" (2016)

Music video
- "Feel Right" on YouTube

"Feel Right" is a song recorded by British record producer Mark Ronson, with vocals from American rapper Mystikal, for Ronson's fourth studio album, Uptown Special (2015). It was later released as the album's second single in the United Kingdom, and the third official single overall, on 29 March 2015.

== Music video ==
The official audio for the single was uploaded to Vevo on November 24, 2014. The music video, co-directed by Cameron Duddy and Bruno Mars, premiered on Ronson's Vevo channel on 10 May 2015. The video takes place during a school talent show set in the fictional Sunnydale High, with actress Florence Henderson making an appearance to announce the band Uptown Special. Mars, Mystikal and Ronson appear in the video as judges of the show.

== Live performances ==
On 22 November 2014, Ronson first performed the song live on Saturday Night Live, with Mystikal making an appearance and Bruno Mars doing background vocals. On 10 February 2015, Ronson and Mystikal performed the track with The Roots on The Tonight Show with Jimmy Fallon.

== Track listing ==
CD single

1. "Feel Right" (featuring Mystikal) – 3:42

== Charts ==
=== Weekly charts ===
Chart (2015)	Peak position
Belgium (Ultratop 50 Flanders)	45
Belgium Urban (Ultratop Flanders)	12
Belgium (Ultratip Bubbling Under Wallonia)	30
France (SNEP)	146
Mexico Ingles Airplay (Billboard)	16
UK Singles (Official Charts Company)	152
US Rhythmic Airplay (Billboard)	35
