= Emotional Eternal =

2022 studio album by Melody's Echo Chamber

Studio album by Melody's Echo Chamber
- Released: 29 April 2022
- Studio: Buller & Bäng (Stockholm, Sweden)
- Genre: Psychedelic pop
- Length: 31:40
- Language: French; English
- Label: Domino
- Producer: Melody Prochet; Fredrik Swahn; Reine Fiske

Melody's Echo Chamber chronology
Bon Voyage (2018)	Emotional Eternal (2022)	Unfold (2022)

Emotional Eternal is the third studio album by French psychedelic pop band Melody's Echo Chamber, released on 29 April 2022 by Domino Records.

== Reception ==
Professional ratings
Aggregate scores
Source	Rating
AnyDecentMusic?	7.1/10
Metacritic	77/100
Review scores
Source	Rating
AllMusic	4/5 stars
The Line of Best Fit	7
Loud & Quiet	6/10
Mojo	4/5 stars
NME	4/5 stars
Record Collector	4/5 stars
The Scotsman	4/5 stars
Spin	8/10
Uncut	8/10

At Metacritic, which assigns a normalised rating out of 100 to reviews from mainstream critics, Emotional Eternal received an average score of 77, based on 7 reviews, indicating "generally favorable reviews". The album also received a 7.1 aggregate on AnyDecentMusic?.

== Track listing ==
All tracks are written by Melody Prochet, Fredrik Swan and Reine Fiske.

No.	Title	Length
1.	"Emotional Eternal"	3:47
2.	"Looking Backward"	3:22
3.	"Pyramids in the Clouds"	3:32
4.	"The Hypnotist"	3:52
5.	"Personal Message"	4:01
6.	"Where the Water Clears the Illusion"	3:03
7.	"A Slow Dawning of Peace"	3:21
8.	"Alma_The Voyage"	6:42
Total length:		31:40

== Personnel ==
All personnel credits adapted from album liner notes.

- Melody Prochet – production
- Matt Colton – mastering
- Matthew Cooper – design
- Fredrik Swahn – production, mixing
- Reine Fiske – production, mixing
- Gustav Ejstes – organ (track 7), piano and flute (track 8)
- Moussa Fadera – drums (track 3)
- Johan Holmegard – drums (track 8)
- Josefin Runsteen – strings (track 5)
- Diane Sagnier – photography
- Drew Tetz – phenakistoscope

== Charts ==
Chart performance for Emotional Eternal
Chart (2022)	Peak position
UK Albums Sales (OCC)	50
UK Independent Album Breakers (OCC)	5
UK Independent Albums (OCC)	24
UK Physical Albums (OCC)	50
US Top Current Album Sales (Billboard)	65
