= Moodoïd =

French psychedelic rock band

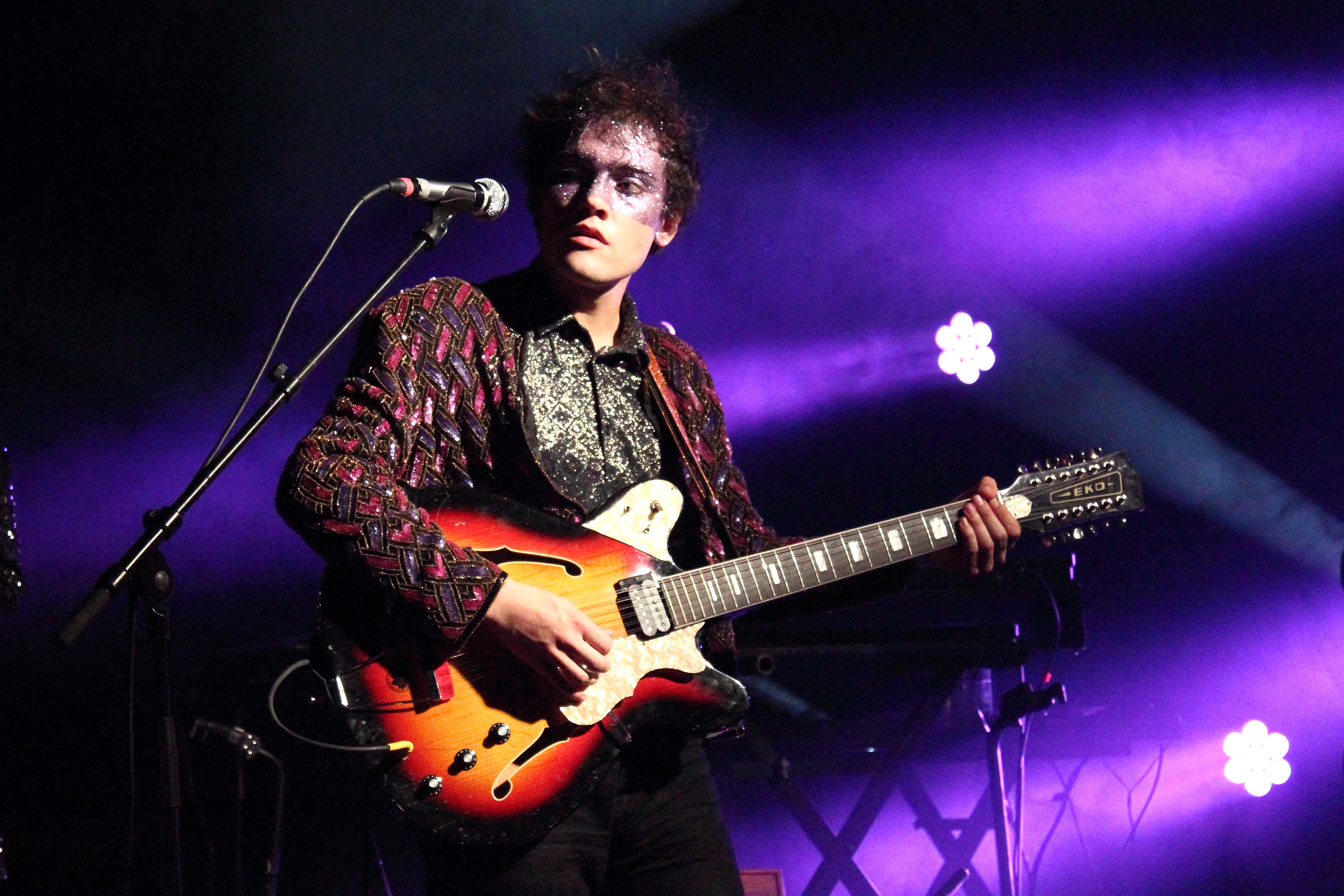
- Moodoïd performing live in Poitiers, in 2014

Background information
- Origin: Paris, France
- Genres: Psychedelic rock, Fusion music
- Years active: 2010–present
- Labels: Because; Entreprise; Sony
- Members: Pablo Padovani; Clémence Lasme; Lucie Droga; Lucie Antunes; Maud Nadal
- Website: www.moodoid.com

Moodoïd (/ˈmuːdɔɪd/) is a French psychedelic rock band and a musical fusion project spearheaded by Pablo Padovani, the guitarist for Melody's Echo Chamber. The other members are Clémence on bass guitar, Lucie on keyboards and Lucie on drums.

Moodoïd released its self-titled EP Moodoïd on French label Enterprise in late 2013. The EP was mixed by Tame Impala's Kevin Parker. It was followed by Moodoïd's debut studio album Le monde Möö released on 18 August 2014 on Enterprise and Sony, that included the Moodoïd EP materials as a second CD with the release.

The band is influenced by various genres of rock, pop, folk, metal, psychedelic sounds and international ethnic influences. Members appear in flamboyant clothing and makeup and release colourful music videos including "Les chemins de traverse", "La lune", "Je suis la montagne", "La chanson du ciel de diamants", "De folie pure" etc. Moodoïd appeared as one of the main acts of festival Fnac Live Paris on 19 July 2014.

== Members ==
- Pablo Padovani – vocals and frontman. Prior to Moodoïd, he was a guitarist for Melody's Echo Chamber. He is the son of Jean Marc Padovani, a celebrated jazz musician himself who also contributed to the production. He has also directed some short films and music videos.
- Clémence Lasme – bass guitar
- Lucie Droga – keyboards
- Lucie Antunes – drums
- Maud Nadal – vocal, guitar

== Discography ==
=== Albums ===
Year	Title	Album details
2014	Le Monde Möö	Date of release : 18 August 2014 Label : Entreprise / Sony Format : CD, LP, Digital
2018	Cité Champagne	Date of release : 8 June 2018 Label : Because Music Format : CD, LP, Digital

=== EP ===
Year	Title	EP details
2013	Moodoïd EP - Je suis la Montagne / De Folie Pure	Date of release : 9 September 2013 Label : Entreprise / Sony
2017	Reptile	Date of release : 29 November 2017 Label : Because Music Format : CD, LP, Digital

=== Singles ===
Year	Title	Date of release
2014	La Lune / Les Chemins de Traverse	Date of release : 16 June 2014 Label : Entreprise / Sony
2015	Le Lac d'Or	Date of release : 11 March 2015 Label : Entreprise / Sony

== Video director ==
Year	Title	Artist	Director	Producer
2016	Toi et Moi	Paradis	Pablo Padovani	Barclay / Universal
2015	Heavy Metal Be Bop 2	Moodoïd	Pablo Padovani	Entreprise
2014	Les Chemins de Traverse	Moodoïd	Pablo Padovani	Entreprise
2013	Winter IX	Caandides	Pablo Padovani	Entreprise
2013	First US Shenanigans / Snowcapped Andes Crash	Melody's Echo Chamber	Pablo Padovani	Domino
2013	De Folie Pure	Moodoïd	Pablo Padovani	Entreprise
2013	Sensation Pop	Garçon d'Argent	Pablo Padovani	Garçon d'Argent
2013	Mauvaise Mine	Lafayette	Pablo Padovani	Entreprise
2013	Je Suis La Montagne	Moodoïd	Pablo Padovani	Moodoïd
2012	Basement Love	Bot'Ox	Pablo Padovani	I'm A Cliché
