= Daffodils (song) =

Single by Mark Ronson featuring Kevin Parker

from the album Uptown Special
- Released: 4 February 2015
- Studio: Royal (Memphis, Tennessee); Zelig (London, UK); Enormous (Venice, California); The Premises (London, UK)
- Genre: Funk; psychedelic rock
- Length: 4:58
- Label: RCA
- Songwriters: Michael Chabon; Kevin Parker
- Producers: Mark Ronson; Jeff Bhasker; James Ford (add.); Riton (add.)

Mark Ronson singles chronology
"Uptown Funk" (2014)	"Daffodils" (2015)	"Feel Right" (2015)

Kevin Parker singles chronology
"Daffodils" (2015)

"Daffodils" is a song recorded by British record producer Mark Ronson, with vocals from Australian singer Kevin Parker better known by the stage name Tame Impala, for Ronson's fourth studio album, Uptown Special (2015), released as the album's second single. It was officially released to adult album alternative radio in the United States on 4 February 2015.

== Music video ==
The official audio for the single was uploaded to Vevo on 22 December 2014. An official music video was premiered on 10 February 2016, featuring model Sarah McDaniel. The music video was directed by Theo Wenner and it includes the song "Summer Breaking" along with "Daffodils".

== Personnel ==
Musicians

- Kevin Parker – vocals, guitars, bass, keys
- Mark Ronson – keys, percussion
- Jeff Bhasker – keys
- James Ford – keys, analogue sequencer
- Riton – analogue sequencer
- Kirin J. Callinan – guitar
- Carlos Alomar – guitar
- Steve Jordan – "silky disco" hi-hat

Production

- Mark Ronson – production, engineering
- Jeff Bhasker – production, engineering
- James Ford – additional production, engineering
- Riton – additional production
- Boo Mitchell – engineering
- Artie Smith – engineering
- Josh Blair – engineering
- Riccardo Damian – engineering
- Tom Elmhirst – mixing
- Joe Visciano – mixing assistance
- Tom Coyne – mastering

== Charts ==
=== Weekly charts ===
Chart (2015)	Peak position
Mexico Ingles Airplay (Billboard)	28
Russia Airplay (Tophit)	206
