= Unclouded =

Studio album by Melody's Echo Chamber
- Released: 5 December 2025
- Genre: Psychedelic pop
- Length: 29:59
- Label: Domino
- Producer: Melody Prochet; Sven Wunder

Melody's Echo Chamber chronology
Unfold (2022)	Unclouded (2025)

Singles from Unclouded
- 1. "Daisy" Released: 10 September 2025; 2. "In the Stars" Released: 30 September 2025; 3. "Eyes Closed" Released: 29 October 2025; 4. "The House That Doesn't Exist" Released: 01 December 2025

Unclouded is the fourth studio album by French musician Melody Prochet, under her psychedelic pop project Melody's Echo Chamber. It was released on 5 December 2025 through Domino Records.

== Background and promotion ==
On September 8, 2025, Melody's Echo Chamber announced a new collaboration with El Michels Affair, titled "Daisy". It was released two days later on September 10.

On September 30, Prochet officially announced Unclouded and released the second single from the album, "In the Stars".

In support of the album's release, she announced a 21-date Europe and US tour. It is set to start on April 14, 2026 in Berlin, and conclude on May 23, 2026 in Seattle.

On October 29, the third single "Eyes Closed" was released, and on December 1, the final pre-release single "The House That Doesn't Exist" was released.

== Track listing ==
All tracks are written by Melody Prochet and Joel Danell except "Daisy", which was co-written by Melody Prochet, Leon Michels, and Paul Castelluzzo.

No.	Title	Length
1.	"The House That Doesn't Exist"	2:23
2.	"In the Stars"	2:39
3.	"Flowers Turn Into Gold"	1:30
4.	"Eyes Closed"	2:57
5.	"Childhood Dream"	3:17
6.	"Memory's Underground"	2:40
7.	"Broken Roses"	2:27
8.	"Burning Man"	2:27
9.	"Into Shadows"	2:47
10.	"How to Leave Misery Behind"	2:08
11.	"Unclouded"	2:00
12.	"Daisy" (featuring El Michels Affair)	2:44
Total length:		29:59

== Personnel ==
Credits adapted from Tidal.

=== Musicians ===
- Melody Prochet – vocals
- Joel Danell – keyboards (tracks 1–11), string conductor (1, 4–8, 10, 11)
- Love Örsan – bass guitar (1–11)
- Malcolm Catto – drums (1–11)
- Daniel Ögren – guitar (1–11)
- Josefin Runsteen – string conductor, violin (1, 4–8, 10, 11); background vocals (5, 10)
- Kristina Winiarski – cello (1, 4, 5, 7, 8, 10, 11)
- Reine Fiske – guitar (2–8, 10)
- Anders Scherp – vibraphone (5, 8, 11)
- Per "Texas" Johansson – flute (8)
- Leon Michels – vocals, flute, organ, piano, recorder, synthesizer (12)
- Paul Castelluzzo – bass guitar, drums (12)

=== Technical ===
- Melody Prochet – production
- Sven Wunder – production, engineering, recording (1–11)
- Leon Michels – production (12)
- Hether – production (12)
- Jens Jungkurth – mixing (1–11)
- Alex Deturk – mastering
- Andreas Tengblad – recording (1–11)
- Malcolm Catto – recording (1–11)
- Léo Grislin – sound editing (1–11)

== Charts ==
Chart performance for Unclouded
Chart (2025)	Peak position
UK Album Downloads (OCC)	47
UK Independent Albums (OCC)	29
UK Record Store (OCC)	19
