= Back hip circle =

The back hip circle is an element in men's and women's artistic gymnastics. It is usually performed on the uneven bars or horizontal bar, but can also be done on the balance beam.

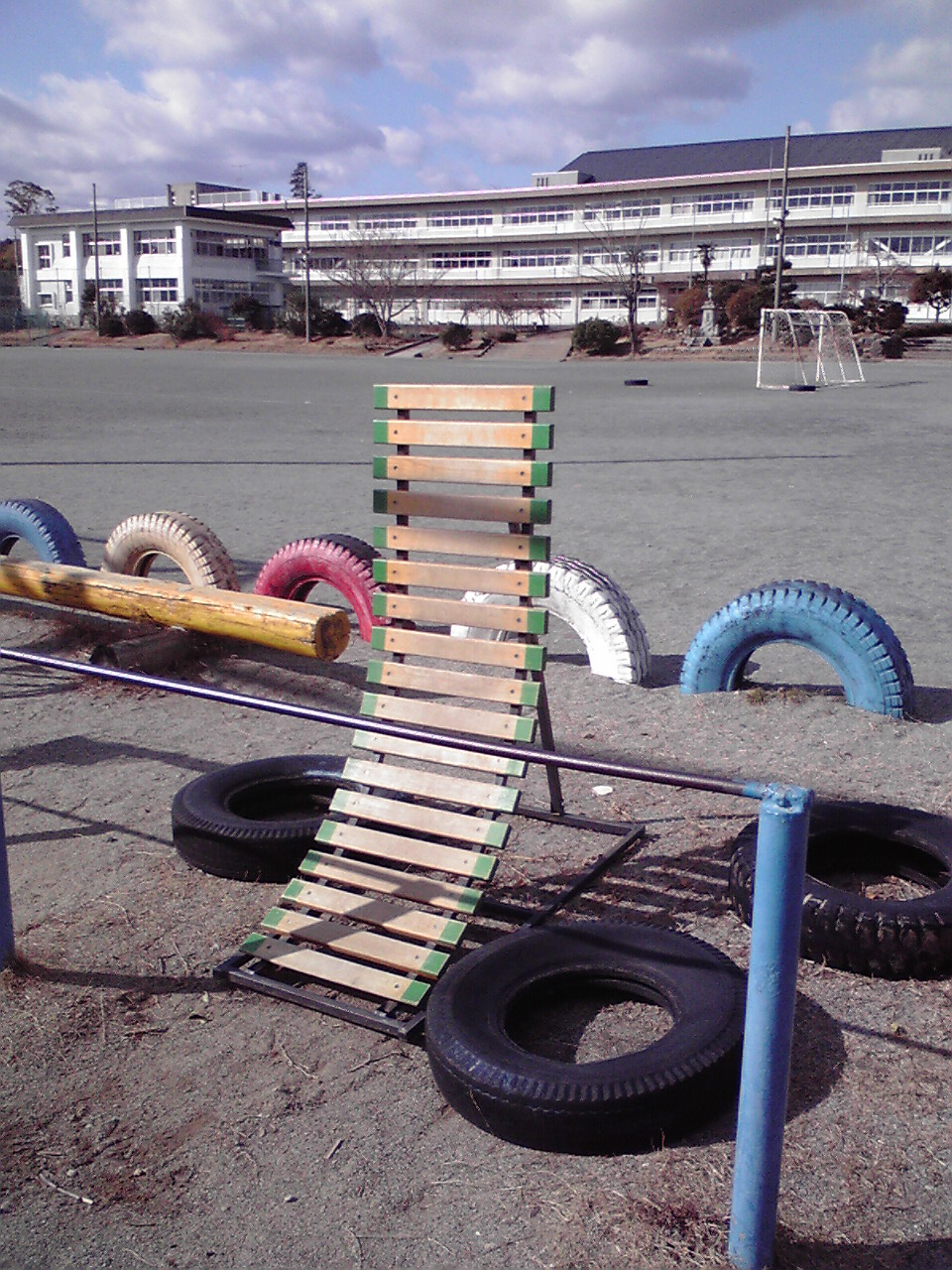
Back hip circle training apparatus in Japan

The back hip circle is a basic skill and is usually one of the first learned by beginning gymnasts. It also appears as a component of more advanced moves.

On bars, the back hip circle is usually performed in combination with a cast. To perform the skill, the gymnast rests on the bar in a front support. He casts away, returns to the bar, and travels around it, returning to a front support.

A more advanced version of the back hip circle is the clear hip. In this move, the gymnast still circles backwards around the bar, but does not return to a front support. A clear hip can be linked to a handstand, dismount or release move.

On beam, the Yurchenko loop and the Teza both end in back hip circles.
