= Melody Prochet =

French singer (born 1987)

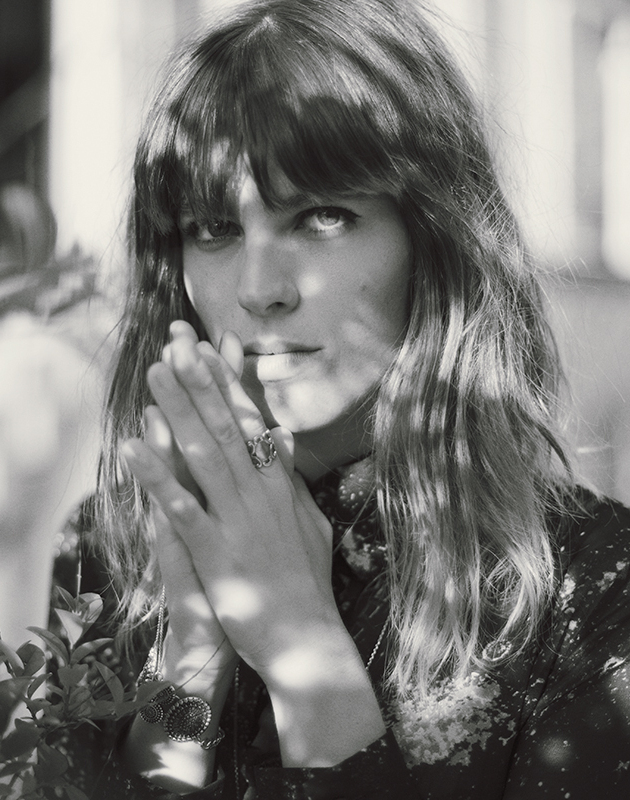
- Prochet in 2012

Background information
- Also known as: Melody Van Kappers
- Born: Juliana Melody Prochet; 3 April 1987 (age 39); Puyricard, France
- Genres: Psychedelic rock, dream pop, neo-psychedelia, space rock
- Occupations: Singer, songwriter
- Years active: 2010–present
- Labels: Fat Possum Records & Domino Records

Juliana Melody Prochet (born 3 April 1987) is a French musician. She is the lead singer and songwriter of her musical project Melody's Echo Chamber. Prochet's musical style has been described as dream pop, space rock, psychedelic rock, and shoegaze. Music critics have compared her work with that of Stereolab, Broadcast, and Cocteau Twins.

== Early life ==
Melody Prochet was born and raised in Puyricard. She had a musical upbringing, learning to play the piano and the viola at a young age, the latter of which she says influenced her "orchestral" approach to songwriting.

== Career ==
=== 2010–2011: My Bee's Garden and The Narcoleptic Dancers ===
In 2010, Prochet released her first album, Hunt the Sleeper, as part of the band My Bee's Garden.

Prochet, under the name Melody Van Kappers, formed The Narcoleptic Dancers in 2010 with Dutch musician Anton Louis Jr. They released their only album Never Sleep in 2011. Prochet and Louis claimed to the press that they were half-siblings born to a Dutch professional soccer player named Johnny Van Kappers, and that they discovered a shared passion for music after meeting at their father's funeral in the early 2000s; the validity of these statements is unclear, as there appears to be no record of Johnny Van Kappers' existence or soccer career.

=== 2012–present: Melody's Echo Chamber ===
Prochet released her self-titled debut album as Melody's Echo Chamber in 2012. The album was produced by her then-boyfriend Kevin Parker of Tame Impala. It peaked at number 61 on the US Billboard Heatseekers Album Chart and received generally favorable reviews from critics. Q Magazine rated the album 8/10, calling it an "intoxicating listen that's well worth experiencing for yourself." Drowned in Sound's Dom Gourlay awarded the album 9/10 and stated: "Whatever happens next, she can rest assured safe in the knowledge that together with her beau they've conjured up one of 2012's--or any other year in recent memory--finest debuts." While the album gave Prochet recognition, the press had focused on Parker's contributions, particularly around the album's similarities to Tame Impala instead of her own work. She commented that "[Parker] never acknowledged it and didn't do anything to protect me or my work." Prochet has stated that she and Parker were working on a second album together before their breakup, but was scrapped due to what she described the recording process as a "painful" period for her.

In the years following the release of her debut album Prochet went on several tours, playing shows around the world. She was scheduled to play at the Levitation festival in Austin, Texas, in 2015, but her performance was later cancelled due to visa issues.

In 2014 Prochet released the single "Shirim", which was thought to be a teaser for her next studio album; however, she remained on musical hiatus for nearly three years. On 3 April 2017, Prochet's 30th birthday, she announced her second album Bon Voyage and released its second single "Cross My Heart". This was followed by "Breathe In/Breathe Out" one year later in April 2018. Bon Voyage was released on 15 June 2018, to "generally favorable reviews" from critics. It was recorded in Sweden and produced by Swedish musicians Reine Fiske of Dungen and Fredrik Swahn of The Amazing. Prochet did not tour or play any live shows following the album's release, citing a desire to focus on her family.

Prochet told Pitchfork shortly after the release of Bon Voyage that she was taking a break from writing music, stating "There is always music inside of me. Maybe I'll let it [stay] in there for a while."

== Personal life ==
On 27 June 2017, a statement was released by Prochet's family that she had been in a serious accident and would need to be in the hospital for several months, resulting in the cancellation of her upcoming tour. Her family later provided an update saying she experienced a brain aneurysm and broken vertebrae. No further details about the accident were ever released. This incident pushed back the release date of Bon Voyage, originally slated to be in the spring of 2017, to June 2018.

Prochet has one child, a daughter named Alma.

== Discography ==
=== Albums ===
==== My Bee's Garden ====
- 2010 – Hunt the Sleeper

==== The Narcoleptic Dancers ====
- 2011 – Never Sleep
- 2010 – Not Evident (EP)
- 2011 – Rastakraut (Single)

==== Melody's Echo Chamber ====
- 2012 – Melody's Echo Chamber
- 2018 – Bon Voyage
- 2022 – Emotional Eternal
- 2022 – Unfold
- 2025 – Unclouded
