= Uptown Special =

Studio album by Mark Ronson
- Released: 13 January 2015
- Studios: Royal (Memphis, Tennessee); Dunham (Brooklyn, New York); Zelig (London, England); Cherry Beach (Toronto, Ontario); Enormous (Venice, California); The Premises (London, England); Chicago Recording Company (Chicago, Illinois); The Armoury (Vancouver, British Columbia); Levcon (Los Angeles, California); Daptone (Brooklyn, New York)
- Genres: Funk; R&B
- Length: 38:50
- Labels: RCA; Sony
- Producers: Mark Ronson; Jeff Bhasker; Bruno Mars; Emile Haynie; Boys Noize; DJ Zinc; James Ford; Riton; TEED

Mark Ronson chronology
Record Collection (2010)	Uptown Special (2015)	Late Night Feelings (2019)

Singles from Uptown Special
- 1. "Uptown Funk" Released: 10 November 2014; 2. "Daffodils" Released: 4 February 2015; 3. "Feel Right" Released: 29 March 2015

Uptown Special is the fourth studio album by British musician, DJ and producer Mark Ronson. The album was released on 13 January 2015 in the US and 19 January 2015 in the UK. It is his first album in nearly five years, following Record Collection (2010) and his first solo album since Version (2007). Ronson dedicated the album to the late Amy Winehouse.

Uptown Special became Ronson's first number one on the UK Albums Chart (with his previous two albums charting at number two), and reached number two on the Australian ARIA Albums Chart and number five on the US Billboard 200.

== Composition ==
=== Music and lyrics ===
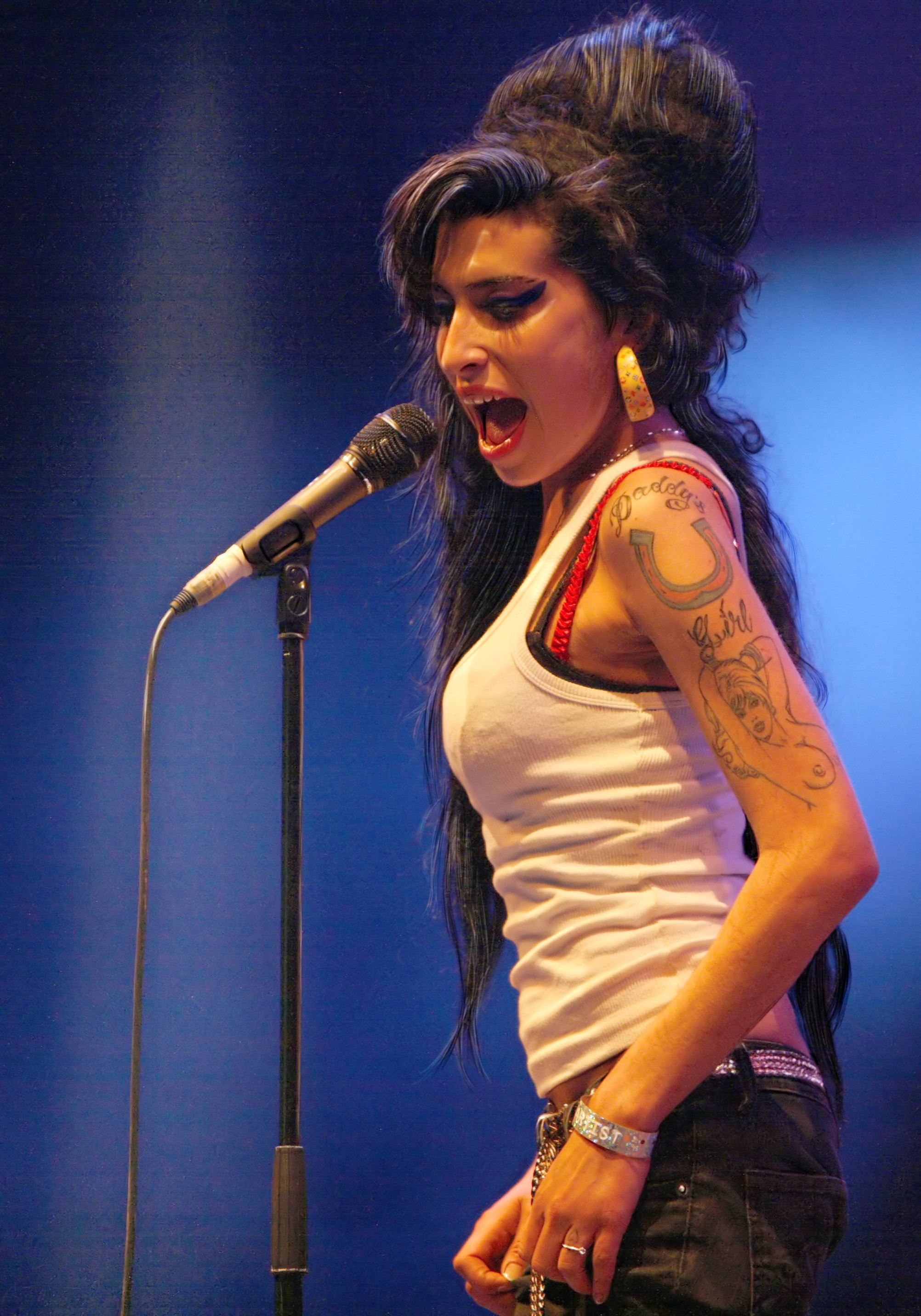
Uptown Special was dedicated to Amy Winehouse (pictured in 2007) who had previously worked with Ronson.

The melody for "Uptown's First Finale" was inspired by the first set of lyrics that Michael Chabon sent to Mark Ronson. Despite Ronson loving the lyrics he kept hearing the melody as if it were being played by Stevie Wonder with his signature melodica tone. Owing to this, Ronson decided to send a "Hail Mary" letter and the song to Wonder's manager. Despite not expecting a response, a few months later Ronson was contacted and told that Wonder had recorded the part for him. Ronson said of the event "When I first heard it, it was one of the most emotional experiences I've ever had. I was dumbfounded, speechless, whatever word you want to use, I was all of those things. I still can't believe somewhere in a studio in Chicago one night, Stevie Wonder actually recorded a piece of music that I wrote. I've listened to it a hundred times and it still messes me up when I play it". Additionally, the track's title serves as an homage to Wonder's 1974 album Fulfillingness' First Finale.

"Summer Breaking" came out when Ronson met Jeff Bhasker in his house in Venice, LA to start working on Ronson's album. Ronson wrote the chords and melody to the song in one night that Bhasker left earlier. Ronson stated "It's something way more complex than anything I've done before, I don't really even know the names of the chords – they just sort of came out of me."

"Feel Right" backing track was recorded on a "whim", before Mark went in studio with Mystikal, in Memphis. However "it worked out to be so well suited to his vocal style". The two met in Baton Rouge with Bhasker and "[legendary New Orleans rap producer]" KLC, thanks to jazz musician Trombone Shorty, who gave Mystikal's phone number to Ronson.

"Uptown Funk" had its beginning "out of a jam in Bruno's studio in LA". While Mars was drumming, Bhasker was playing the synths and Ronson was on the bass. After they "got the basic groove", Philip Lawrence joined and they wrote the lyrics to the first verse. They finished the song in Toronto, six months later.

"I Can’t Lose" was written mostly by Bhasker, who came up with the idea of "drive through the deep south to find someone to sing it". Ronson loved the idea "of discovering a new talent" and the two ended by up hearing a "few hundred amazing singers" in churches, nightclubs, bars and community centers. However they "had a very specific vocalist in mind", who turned out to be Keyone as both of them realised as she started singing.

"Daffodils" riff and vocal idea first played in demo form and sent by Kevin Parker of Tame Impala. The lyrics were written by Parker and Chabon in Memphis. Later Ronson, Riton and James Ford added the synths and Kirin J. Callinan "laid this insane guitar solo", as described by Ronson. Finally, in the process of mixing in New York, Tom Elmhirst (the mix engineer) took some of the synths out.

The lyrics to "Crack in the Pearl" were the first Chabon wrote for the album, and the first he sent to Ronson and Bhasker. The melody of the song started to form in Ronson's head as he read the words of the chorus ("Is this how you pictured it?/Is this how you thought it would be?"). Ronson admits that is unusual for him to have melodies popping into his head, referring to the experience as "alley-oop".

"Leaving Los Feliz" lyrics are based on "an ageing hipster who doesn’t want to admit that he’s too old to still be going to the party". Ronson added, "it's not semi-autobiographical at all". He explained "Los Feliz is an artsy/hipster/musician area of Los Angeles".

Regarding "Crack in the Pearl pt. II", Ronson admitted that he had to bring Wonder back "one more time!".

== Singles ==
- "Uptown Funk" was the first single released from the album on 10 November 2014, and it featured guest vocals from Bruno Mars. The single peaked at number one on the UK Singles Chart, marking Ronson's first number one song as an artist and producer; as well as peaking at number one on the Irish Singles Chart. It topped the Billboard Hot 100, becoming Ronson's first number-one single in the country and Mars' sixth.
- "Daffodils", with Kevin Parker's vocals, was initially released as the album's second promotional single. It was officially released to adult album alternative radio in the United States on 4 February 2015.
- "Feel Right", featuring Mystikal, was initially released as the album's first promotional single. It was later released as the album's second single in the United Kingdom, and third official single overall, on 29 March 2015.

== Critical reception ==
Professional ratings
Aggregate scores
Source	Rating
Metacritic	73/100
Review scores
Source	Rating
AllMusic	3.5/5 stars
The A.V. Club	A−
Consequence of Sound	C+
The Daily Telegraph	4/5 stars
Entertainment Weekly	B+
The Guardian	4/5 stars
Pitchfork	6/10
Rolling Stone	3.5/5 stars
Slant Magazine	3.5/5 stars
Spin	6/10

Upon release, Uptown Special received positive reviews from music critics. Lily Moayeri from The A.V. Club gave the album an A−, commenting that the album is "pop-friendly, and undeniably sexy collection of funk and R&B", and praised the tracks "Summer Breaking", "Daffodils", "Feel Right", "I Can’t Lose", "Crack in the Pearl", and "Heavy and Rolling". Kyle Anderson from Entertainment Weekly gave the album a B+ and stated that "the cumulative effect of Special's contagious cool will keep hands up and bad vibes down – and if all else fails, just put 'Feel Right' on repeat".

Alexis Petridis from The Guardian gave the album four out of five stars, noting the "absence of anything that resembles the music that made Mark Ronson famous". James Reed from The Boston Globe felt Ronson came back with a "hard funk album that pays tribute to the music he grew up with" and felt the album worked "under the guise of what Ronson considers funky". Q felt that "It's quite a feat to produce music that works for the mind and the hips, but Ronson has pulled it off magnificently, with virtually every track sounding like a single". Neil McCormick from The Daily Telegraph gave the album four out of five stars, stating that the album "veers wildly from high to low brow, stupid to sophisticated" and that "occasionally the mix jars but mostly it’s a compelling collision, falling somewhere between a chin-stroking jazz poetry recital and a riotous teenage disco". Randall Roberts of Los Angeles Times gave the album a 3/4 rating, calling it "the kind that strive[s] for an everyman universality while acknowledging a rich past of soul-inspired pop music.".

Andy Kellman from AllMusic, Will Hermes from Rolling Stone, and Annie Galvin from Slant Magazine all also gave the album three and a half out of five stars. Kellman dubbed Uptown Special as a "nostalgic fantasy that provides light entertainment and provokes backtracking". Hermes found that the album "could even teach Prince a trick or two". While, Galvin believes if it was not for "Chabon's peculiar imagery and Ronson's use of the occasional drum machine and synthesizer", the album would sound "like an earnestly literary concept album or a kitschy imitation of Ronson's favorite records from the not so distant past". Ryan B. Patrick of Exclaim! felt that the record favoured style over substance, writing that "Uptown Special is unapologetic in revelling in its musical influences and ultimately represents a light and mainstream-friendly primer to funk and soul."

In a mixed review, Andrew Unterberger of Spin gave the album a 6/10 rating, and felt the material was "fun, and unexpectedly thrilling at times, but jarring and never totally satisfying." Kevin Harley of The Independent believes the album offers "fresh pleasures is the pay-off, but don’t come looking to it for substance". Jim Farber from Daily News gave an overall 3/5 rating and claimed that Ronson "just got lucky". He particularly criticized “Uptown Funk” for being a "lazy track", unlike the rest of the songs, which "obsess on the past, but most enliven it".

== Commercial performance ==
The album debuted at number 5 on the US Billboard 200, selling a total of 76,727 copies, with 46,680 of those copies calculated from individual song sales and streaming data. This is a tracking change was implemented by Nielsen SoundScan and Billboard in December 2014. In its second week, the album fell to number 10, selling 42,582 copies, with 38,942 of those copies calculated from individual song sales and streaming data. In its third week, the album fell to number 11, selling 42,780 copies, with 36,522 of those copies calculated from individual song sales and streaming data. In its fourth week, the album fell to number 13, selling 42,269 copies, 7,389 of which were whole album sales. In its fifth week, the album rose to number 12, selling 35,041 copies, 4,944 of which were whole album sales. In its sixth week, the album fell to number 16, selling 32,475 copies, 4,317 of which were whole album sales. In its seventh week, the album remained at number 16, selling 29,278 copies, 4,248 were whole album sales.

== Track listing ==
No.	Title	Writer(s)	Producer(s)	Length
1.	"Uptown's First Finale" (featuring Stevie Wonder and Andrew Wyatt)	Mark Ronson; Jeff Bhasker; Michael Chabon	Ronson; Bhasker; Emile Haynie^{[a]}	1:40
2.	"Summer Breaking" (featuring Kevin Parker)	Ronson; Bhasker; Chabon; Kevin Parker	Ronson; Bhasker; Haynie^{[a]}	3:07
3.	"Feel Right" (featuring Mystikal)	Ronson; Michael Tyler; Bruno Mars; Philip Lawrence; Brody Brown; Nick Movshon; Homer Steinweiss; Thomas Brenneck	Ronson; Bhasker; Mars; Boys Noize^{[a]}	3:42
4.	"Uptown Funk" (featuring Bruno Mars)	Ronson; Bhasker; Mars; Lawrence; Devon Gallaspy; Nicholaus Williams; Lonnie Simmons; Ronnie Wilson; Charles Wilson; Rudolph Taylor; Robert Wilson	Ronson; Bhasker; Mars	4:30
5.	"I Can't Lose" (featuring Keyone Starr)	Ronson; Bhasker; Chabon	Ronson; Bhasker; Haynie^{[a]}; DJ Zinc^{[a]}; TEED^{[a]}	3:16
6.	"Daffodils" (featuring Kevin Parker)	Chabon; Parker	Ronson; Bhasker; James Ford^{[a]}; Riton^{[a]}	5:01
7.	"Crack in the Pearl" (featuring Andrew Wyatt)	Ronson; Bhasker; Chabon	Ronson; Bhasker; Haynie^{[a]}	2:25
8.	"In Case of Fire" (featuring Jeff Bhasker)	Ronson; Bhasker; Chabon; Movshon; Alex Greenwald; Rufus Wainwright	Ronson; Bhasker	4:33
9.	"Leaving Los Feliz" (featuring Kevin Parker)	Ronson; Bhasker; Chabon; Parker; Haynie; Chris Vatalaro	Ronson; Bhasker	4:18
10.	"Heavy and Rolling" (featuring Andrew Wyatt)	Ronson; Bhasker; Chabon; Andrew Wyatt	Ronson; Bhasker; Haynie^{[a]}	3:57
11.	"Crack in the Pearl Pt. II" (featuring Stevie Wonder and Jeff Bhasker)	Ronson; Bhasker; Chabon	Ronson; Bhasker	2:16
Total length:				38:50

Notes

- ^{^a} signifies an additional producer.

Sample credits

- "Uptown Funk" embodies portions of "All Gold Everything", written by Devon Gallaspy and Nicholaus Williams, "Oops Up Side Your Head", written by Lonnie Simmons, Ronnie Wilson, Charles Wilson, Rudolph Taylor and Robert Wilson, and "Early in the Morning", written by Wilson, Simmons and Taylor. The last was initially uncredited.
- "I Can't Lose" contains elements of "Ain't No Fun (If the Homies Can't Have None)", written by Nathaniel Hale, Ricardo Brown, Warren Griffin, Andre Young and Calvin Broadus and an interpolation of "Hot Music", written by Joseph Longo.

== Personnel ==
Credits adapted from the album's liner notes.

- Mark Ronson – guitar (tracks 1–5, 7–11), bass (track 11), keyboards (tracks 2, 6), drum programming (tracks 1, 4, 9 and 11), percussion (tracks 2, 6), production (tracks 1–11)
- Jeff Bhasker – lead vocals (track 8, 11), backing vocals (tracks 1, 2, 5, 7, 9, 10), keyboards (tracks 1, 2, 4–11), synthesizer (11) percussion (track 3), talk box (track 4), production (tracks 1–11)
- Bruno Mars – lead vocals (track 4), backing vocals (track 3), drums (track 4), production (tracks 3, 4)
- Kevin Parker – lead vocals (tracks 2, 6, 9), backing vocals (track 10), guitar (track 6), bass (track 6), drums (1, 7, 11), keyboards (6, 9)
- Andrew Wyatt – lead vocals (track 1, 7, 10), backing vocals (track 2, 11), programming (track 10)
- Mystikal – lead vocals (track 3)
- Keyone Starr – lead vocals (track 5), backing vocals (track 1, 7, 11)
- Philip Lawrence – backing vocals (tracks 3,4)
- Lawrence "Boo" Mitchell – backing vocals (track 4)
- Emile Haynie – additional production (tracks 1, 2, 5, 8, 10)
- Boys Noize – additional production (track 3)
- DJ Zinc – additional production (track 5)
- James Ford – keyboards and analogue sequencer (track 6), additional production (track 6)
- Riton – analogue sequencer (track 6), additional production (track 6)
- TEED – additional production (track 5)
- Carlos Alomar – guitar (tracks 1, 5–7, 9, 11)
- Teenie Hodges – guitar (tracks 1, 7)
- Thomas Brenneck – guitar (tracks 3, 8)
- Kirin J. Callinan – guitar (track 6)
- Nick Movshon – bass (tracks 3, 5, 8)
- Willie Weeks – bass (tracks 2, 10)
- Body Brown – bass (track 3)
- Jamareo Artis – bass (track 4)
- Homer Steinweiss – drums (tracks 3, 5, 8)
- Steve Jordan – drums (tracks 2, 10)
- Stevie Wonder – harmonica (tracks 1, 11)
- Peter Cottonale – additional keyboards (tracks 1, 7)
- Phred Brown – additional keyboards (track 4)
- Geoff Zanelli – synth string (track 1)
- Karl Vanden Bossche – percussion (tracks 1, 2, 7, 10)
- Dan Oestreicher – baritone saxophone (tracks 3, 5)
- Ian Hendrickson-Smith – baritone saxophone (track 4)
- Timothy Kinzy McFatter – tenor saxophone (tracks 3, 5)
- Neal Sugarman – tenor saxophone (track 4)
- Dwayne Dagger – tenor saxophone (track 4)
- Trombone Shorty – trumpet & trombone (tracks 3, 5)
- Nico Segal – trumpet (track 1)
- Ray Mason – trombone (track 4)
- Kameron Whalum – trombone & backing vocals (tracks 4)
- David Guy – trumpet (track 4)
- Michael Leonhart – trumpet (track 4)
- Jimmy King – trumpet & backing vocals (track 4)

== Charts ==
=== Weekly charts ===
Chart (2015)	Peak position
Australian Albums (ARIA)	2
Belgian Albums (Ultratop Flanders)	12
Belgian Albums (Ultratop Wallonia)	36
Canadian Albums (Billboard)	3
Danish Albums (Hitlisten)	15
Dutch Albums (Album Top 100)	5
Finnish Albums (Suomen virallinen lista)	8
French Albums (SNEP)	18
German Albums (Offizielle Top 100)	23
Irish Albums (IRMA)	7
Italian Albums (FIMI)	72
New Zealand Albums (RMNZ)	10
Norwegian Albums (VG-lista)	27
Scottish Albums (Official Charts)	2
Spanish Albums (Promusicae)	55
Swedish Albums (Sverigetopplistan)	53
Swiss Albums (Schweizer Hitparade)	3
UK Albums (Official Charts)	1
US Billboard 200	5
US Indie Store Album Sales (Billboard)	4

=== Year-end charts ===
Chart (2015)	Position
Australian Albums (ARIA)	33
Belgian Albums (Ultratop Flanders)	104
Belgian Albums (Ultratop Wallonia)	183
French Albums (SNEP)	148
UK Albums (OCC)	56
US Billboard 200	27

== Certifications ==
Region	Certification	Certified units/sales
Australia (ARIA)	Gold	35,000^{^}
Denmark (IFPI Danmark)	Gold	10,000^{‡}
Mexico (AMPROFON)	Gold	30,000^{‡}
New Zealand (RMNZ)	2× Platinum	30,000^{‡}
Poland (ZPAV)	Gold	10,000^{‡}
United Kingdom (BPI)	Gold	100,000^{*}
United States (RIAA)	Platinum	1,000,000^{‡}
^{*} Sales figures based on certification alone.^{^} Shipments figures based on certification alone.^{‡} Sales+streaming figures based on certification alone.
