= Cast (gymnastics) =

Basic skill in artistic gymnastics

A cast is a basic skill on uneven bars, parallel bars, rings, or horizontal bar in artistic gymnastics. From the front hang, a gymnast pikes (allowing the knee to touch the bar) and slides upwards to a handstand. Some gymnasts may perform the move with straddled legs.
