= Tom Cosm =

New Zealand musician and educator

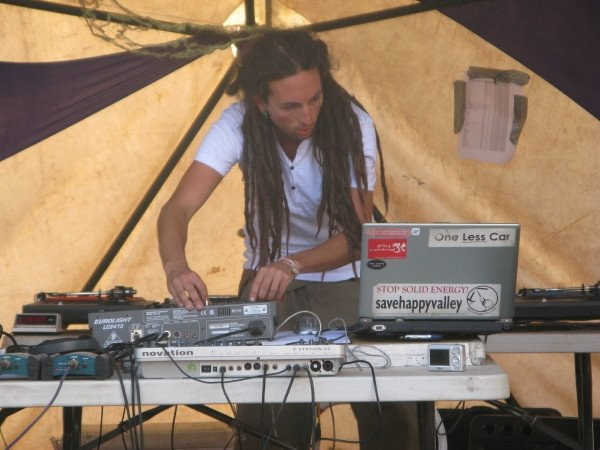
Cosm at the decks at the Rainbow Serpent Festival in 2008

Tom Cosm is an electronic musician and educator based in Christchurch, New Zealand. He is best known for his work within the computer music scene, especially for the creation and distribution of tutorials related to the use of Ableton Live.

== Performing ==
He has performed extensively in both New Zealand (Aotearoa) and Australia, as well as many countries in Europe, Asia and South America. One of his more notable performances was at the Canaan Downs festival in New Zealand.

== Teaching ==
Cosm has led workshops at the Boom Festival in 2008 and the Rainbow Serpent Festival. Along with Pitch Black, Tom led a workshop at Cargo in London on 24 July 2008.

Tom is New Zealand's only Ableton certified trainer and assisted Ableton with both the Australian (2009) and Israeli (2011) certification events.

Cosm makes and publishes online tutorials, providing the methods and techniques for performing live electronic music.

Cosm runs and moderates a teaching website, based on the business model of voluntary payment. Users are able to access a multitude of regularly updated tutorials for free in standard, YouTube-style format, or high-definition through a monthly subscription. All of Tom Cosm's knowledge is given openly. The only real difference between material given to those who voluntarily pay and those that don't, seems to be the quality of video, and the fact that a student can download a lesson in its entirety after subscribing.

Each year he travels to Europe and USA, giving public and private workshops.

== Releases ==
Tom contributed a track to the Compilation Contact Lens on Cosmic Conspiracy Records, two tracks to the compilation Ultrapop 2 on Fabularecords in 2007, and the Earthbeatz compilation on Native Harmonix Records (2008). Tom has since decided not to commercially release any more music, as making it freely available helps build public recognition of his name.

== Distribution ==
Tom makes his work freely available through his website. He has several live sets and tunes available for download. He also offers the component parts of his computer compositions so that others can download and see how they are created.

In his own words "I treat music as a form of communication that completely overpowers that of any other kind of human interaction, and I don't want money or middle men getting in between the link that we create when you listen to my music, or have its access restricted to people who can either afford it, or have the technical ability to steal it. Everyone can download my music free at anytime directly from the source where it was created."

== Personal life and career ==
Tom was born in Christchurch, New Zealand, where he spent his formative years. He left Linwood College (New Zealand) in 2001. Growing up he was influenced by Happy Hardcore, Drum'n'bass and Breakcore/IDM. He also cites classical composers such as Sergei Rachmaninoff and Franz Liszt as large influences. He studied towards a degree in music, specifically Jazz, at the Christchurch Polytechnic Institute of Technology, but left after two years to continue his work with computers and music.
