= I Can't Lose (Mark Ronson song) =

- The Remixes EP artwork

Promotional single by Mark Ronson featuring Keyone Starr

from the album Uptown Special
- Released: 2015
- Recorded: 2014
- Genre: Synthfunk; soul-pop
- Length: 3:16
- Label: Sony; Columbia; RCA
- Songwriters: Jeff Bhasker; Calvin Broadus; Ricardo Brown; Michael Chabon; Warren Griffin; Nathaniel Hale; Joseph Longo; Mark Ronson; Andre Young
- Producers: Jeff Bhasker; Mark Ronson; Totally Enormous Extinct Dinosaurs

"I Can't Lose" is a song by English DJ and record producer Mark Ronson with featured vocals by Keyone Starr. The song is a promotional single from Ronson's fourth studio album Uptown Special, released on 13 January 2015.

== Background ==
The song was written as the follow-up to "Uptown Funk" from Uptown Special. "I Can't Lose" was written mostly by Jeff Bhasker and samples Snoop Dogg's "Ain't No Fun (If the Homies Can't Have None)" and "Hot Music" by Soho; in an interview with The Guardian, Ronson described how Bhaskar had decided that the most appropriate way of discovering an appropriate vocalist for the song was to "drive through the deep south to find someone to sing it", an idea which Ronson loved. This trawling process led to Ronson and Bhaskar sifting through "a few hundred amazing singers" in assorted churches, nightclubs, bars and community centres. However they "had a very specific vocalist in mind", who turned out to be Keyone as both of them realised as she started singing in Mississippi State University.

== Music video ==
A music video was produced for the song. It features both Ronson and Starr performing in an underground Chinatown club along with assorted musicians. The title of the source album, Uptown Special, appears frequently throughout the video. Two rival gangs gamble whilst this performance is going on; after one group loses, a dance-fight breaks out in the car park, with the song's trumpet break causing the club to vibrate. Starr then proceeds to abscond with the winnings and Ronson acts as the getaway driver.

== Critical reception ==
Rolling Stone termed the song "a seductive soul-pop jam". The Guardian described it as "a brass-studded, synth-funk bagatelle that sounds straight outta [sic] 1982".

== Track listing ==
- The Remixes EP
1. I Can't Lose (Artful Remix) – 4:47
2. I Can't Lose (Lindstrøm Remix) – 7:42
3. I Can't Lose (Pomo Remix) – 3:37
4. I Can't Lose (Duke Dumont Remix) – 4:21
5. I Can't Lose (MenuWriteMessage Remix) – 2:32

== Charts ==
Chart (2015)	Peak position
UK Singles (Official Charts Company)	103
