= Kevin Parker =

Australian musician (born 1986)

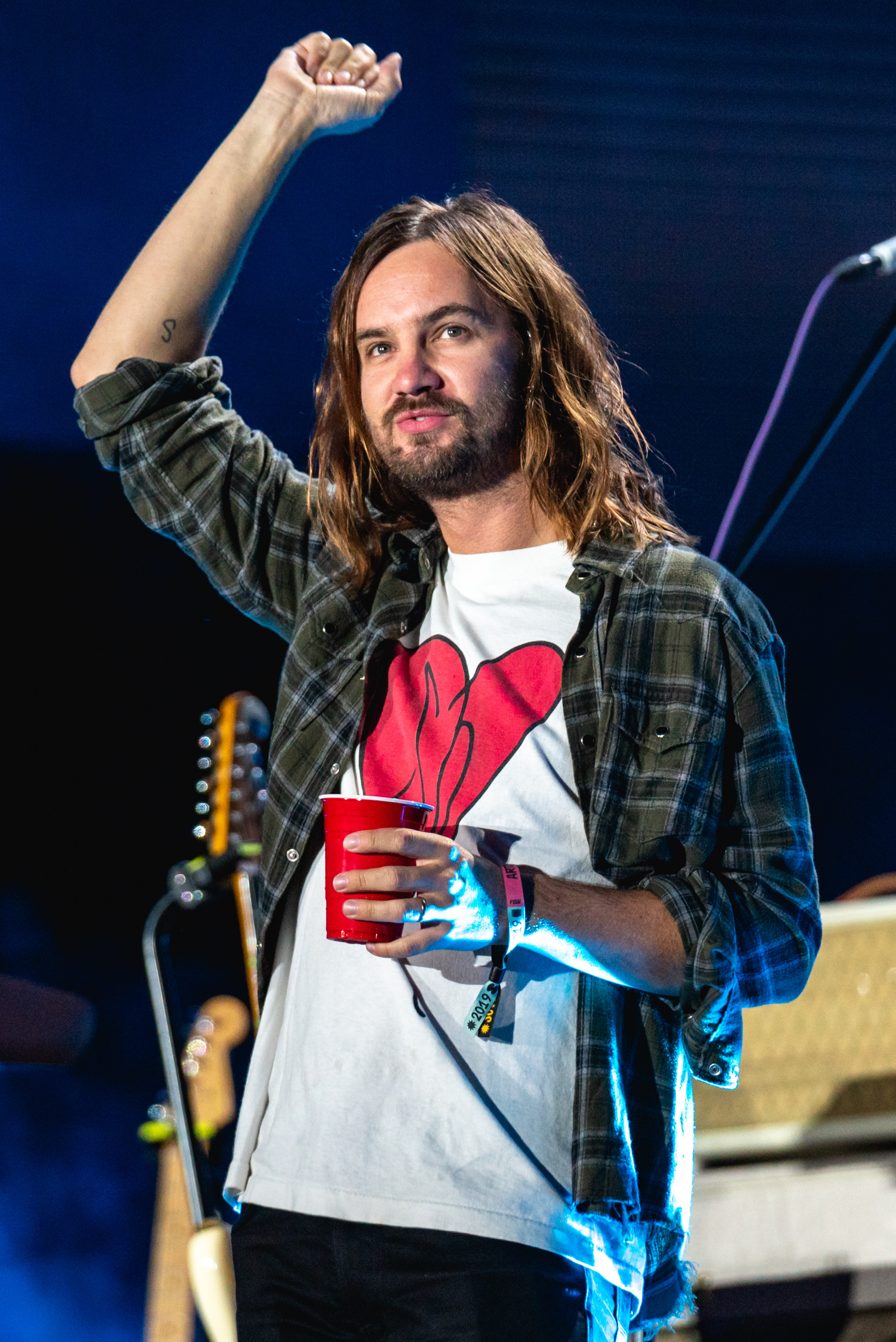
- Parker in 2019
- Born: Kevin Richard Parker; 20 January 1986 (age 40); Sydney, New South Wales, Australia
- Occupations: Singer-songwriter; multi-instrumentalist; musician; record producer; DJ
- Years active: 2005–present
- Children: 2
- Musical career
- Origin: Perth, Western Australia
- Genres: Psychedelic pop; psychedelic rock; neo-psychedelia; synth-pop
- Instruments: Vocals; guitar; drums; bass; keyboards
- Labels: Modular; Interscope; Columbia
- Member of: Tame Impala
- Formerly of: Pond; Mink Mussel Creek
- Website: tameimpala.com

Kevin Richard Parker (born 20 January 1986) is an Australian singer-songwriter, musician, record producer, and DJ, best known for his psychedelic rock musical project Tame Impala, for which he writes, produces, records, and performs the music. Parker has released five Tame Impala albums: Innerspeaker (2010), Lonerism (2012), Currents (2015), The Slow Rush (2020) and Deadbeat (2025). He has won 13 ARIA Music Awards, two APRA Awards, and a Brit Award, and two Grammy Awards from five nominations.

In addition to his work for Tame Impala, Parker was the drummer of Pond from 2009 until 2011. He co-produced the band's studio albums Beard, Wives, Denim (2012), Hobo Rocket (2013), Man It Feels Like Space Again (2015), The Weather (2017), and Tasmania (2019). As a producer, Parker has collaborated with many artists.

== Early life and career beginnings ==
Parker was born on 20 January 1986 in Sydney, Australia. Parker's father is from Zimbabwe, and his mother is from South Africa. Shortly after Parker was born, his family moved to Western Australia, where his father worked as a chief financial officer for the mining firm Gold Fields in Kalgoorlie. The family later moved to Perth, where his parents separated when he was three years old. After moving to Perth, Parker lived primarily with his mother and later stepfather in Mount Lawley, whereas his father moved to Cottesloe. The splitting of his family led to a chaotic upbringing.

Parker grew up with a passion for music from a young age. His father "played a lot of music as a hobby" and was a "big part of [Kevin's] musical upbringing". His first experience playing an instrument was accompanying his father on guitar. He said: "I learned guitar by playing rhythm guitar to his Shadows leads. He wanted to play Shadows lead riffs, because he loves Hank B. Marvin, and he got me to play the chords in the background." Parker's father also played music by The Beatles, The Beach Boys and Supertramp in a cover band, which Parker believes was where he "got [his] love of melody", which has been a significant part of Parker's music. Parker also recalls "amusing [him]self by singing along to the vacuum cleaner when [his] mum was cleaning." Parker's father later purchased his first guitar.

At age 11, Parker took up the drums like his brother did, and later was making "excessively melodic music from about the age of 12 to 15", which was "really weird and repetitive and almost genre-less", by recording his drumming and overdubbing guitar and other instruments in lo-fi experiments. To support his music interests after becoming skilled at music production, Parker got his first eight-track recorder at age 16.

At age 13, Parker met fellow Tame Impala member Dominic Simper in their music class at John XXIII College, Perth, whom he found a musical connection with. Parker and Simper started off playing covers of various artists. In his late-teens, Parker discovered the many 1960s and 1970s psychedelic rock artists that would have a huge influence on his music. He also said that he listened to The Doors, Colour Haze and Black Sabbath, with his main form of inspiration being The Doors and Jefferson Airplane.

As a younger teenager, Parker had periods where he felt lost and alone, saying: "I didn't have the most solid family life. I didn't have a solid base to fall back on there, so I was tackling a lot of things on my own. And I was just lost. I remember thinking, 'I've got no-one'. I remember once, when I was 15 or something, I was brushing my teeth, and I just broke down crying. I just felt so alone." Parker also felt that Tame Impala's 2012 album Lonerism "validates" a lot of the feelings he had as a teenager. He said: "It's got this weird hopefulness to it. Maybe that's the charm of it. Maybe that's why it's done so well."

Parker later had a job as a legal clerk, delivering court documents in Perth. While working there, he wrote songs in his head amidst the boredom. He later quit the job.

=== Early career ===
By the time he was 18, Parker was "playing in the pub scene" and at the time was writing "heavy 70's-style almost prog-rock songs, like Blue Cheer".

Parker's father had always warned him about getting into the music industry, leading to him going on to university for a while and studying engineering. He said: "I wanted to please my dad in a way. I had no idea what I wanted to do, because I didn't enjoy anything other than music." Parker hated it, and later decided to change to astronomy. During an astronomy lecture, Parker saw a slide that he would later paint for the artwork of the Tame Impala EP. However, Parker did not abandon his original dream. He said: "I was at uni, and a couple of months before we got signed, I had submitted to the reality that I wasn't actually going to be a famous musician and I should just get on with my career. So that was when I started to knuckle down and actually do stuff at uni. But at the same time, I could never passionately give my attention to anything other than music. Like, it was a disease. I would not be able to listen to a word in lectures because I'd just be thinking about my new song." On his way to his last astronomy exam, Parker was contacted by Modular Recordings who wished to sign Tame Impala to their label. Upon hearing this, Parker turned his car around from the exam and drove home to make music.

While Parker was recording his first album, his father died after a year-long struggle with cancer. Jerry's death had a "massive" effect on Parker, who said, "It was a weird time, extremely confusing, and I didn't really know what to make of it."

== Music career ==
Parker is a part of the large and diverse Perth music scene, where he has played in various different bands in addition to his main project, Tame Impala. Commenting on this, Parker said "it's a really close-knit scene, quiet, separated from the rest of Australia" and "Tame Impala is just one sliver of the giant amount of noise-making that we do as a circle of friends. I don't feel bad doing the recording by myself because I don't expect that input in their bands...to us Tame Impala is just Kevin Parker's project and everyone has a project."

=== The Dee Dee Dums ===
In 2005, Parker formed a band called The Dee Dee Dums, which would later become the basis of Tame Impala. Originally a two-piece project, with Parker and Luke Epstein, long time Tame Impala member, Dominic Simper, joined the band later on in 2007. The Dee Dee Dums achieved some local acclaim, getting second place at the 2005 AmpFest and winning third place later that year in the state final of The Next Big Thing. In October 2006 Epstein was replaced by drummer Sam Devenport, Epstein going on to play with Sugarpuss. They later went on to win the Western Australia state final of the National Campus Band Competition. Live video of the band in their two piece form, from two different gigs, can be viewed on YouTube.

In late 2007, Parker renamed the band to Tame Impala, and recruited Jay Watson on drums; Devenport went on to pursue an acting career.

Before recruiting Jay Watson on drums, Watson used to "go watch [The Dee Dee Dums] all the time and I was this little 17-year-old fan boy rocking up at their gigs... I knew it was an awesome band. They were my favourite band in Perth actually. I think I told Kevin once that they were in my top 20 bands ever."

Watson then joined the band two months before Modular Recordings approached them. "Those two months before (then) no one cared when we played. Dom and Kev had been playing together for years and we had a good two months of gigs to like seven people at our local pub before we got signed. And they were the best two months ever man!"

Former live bassist Nick Allbrook noted a change in Parker's music and his band, "There were a couple of months where there was a seismic shift in [Kevin's] thing from the Cream influenced, Dee Dee Dums era, and fairly quickly there was the blissed-out, pretty melody, psychedelic thing. And then there was a name change (to Tame Impala), and then a new drummer (Jay Watson) whose style was more elegant than the last drummer."

=== Tame Impala ===
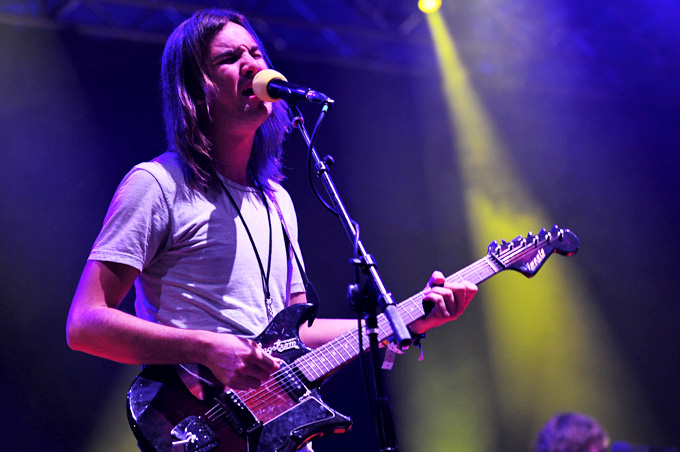
Parker performing in 2011

Tame Impala is Parker's psychedelic rock project. He writes and records almost all of Tame Impala's music, and plays guitar and sings live.

After sending off approximately 20 songs, many of them later leaked to YouTube, that Parker had recorded as far back as 2003 to different record labels, Tame Impala was signed to Modular Recordings. After the release of their 2008 debut EP, Parker revealed his intentions for recording: "Most of the songs on the EP were never meant to be heard by the rest of Perth, let alone the rest of the world. They were just recorded for my own listening sake, and burning a CD of it and putting it in my car and giving it to my friends."

After much touring in 2008 and 2009, Tame Impala's debut album, Innerspeaker was released to widespread critical acclaim in 2010, winning a J Award and a Rolling Stone Award for Album of the Year, and 5 nominations at the ARIAs. Parker's ability to take many elements of 1960s psychedelic rock, and give it a distinctly modern twist, creating a new and original sound was praised. Parker also received a WAMI Award for Best Guitarist and an APRA Award for Breakthrough Songwriter of the Year.

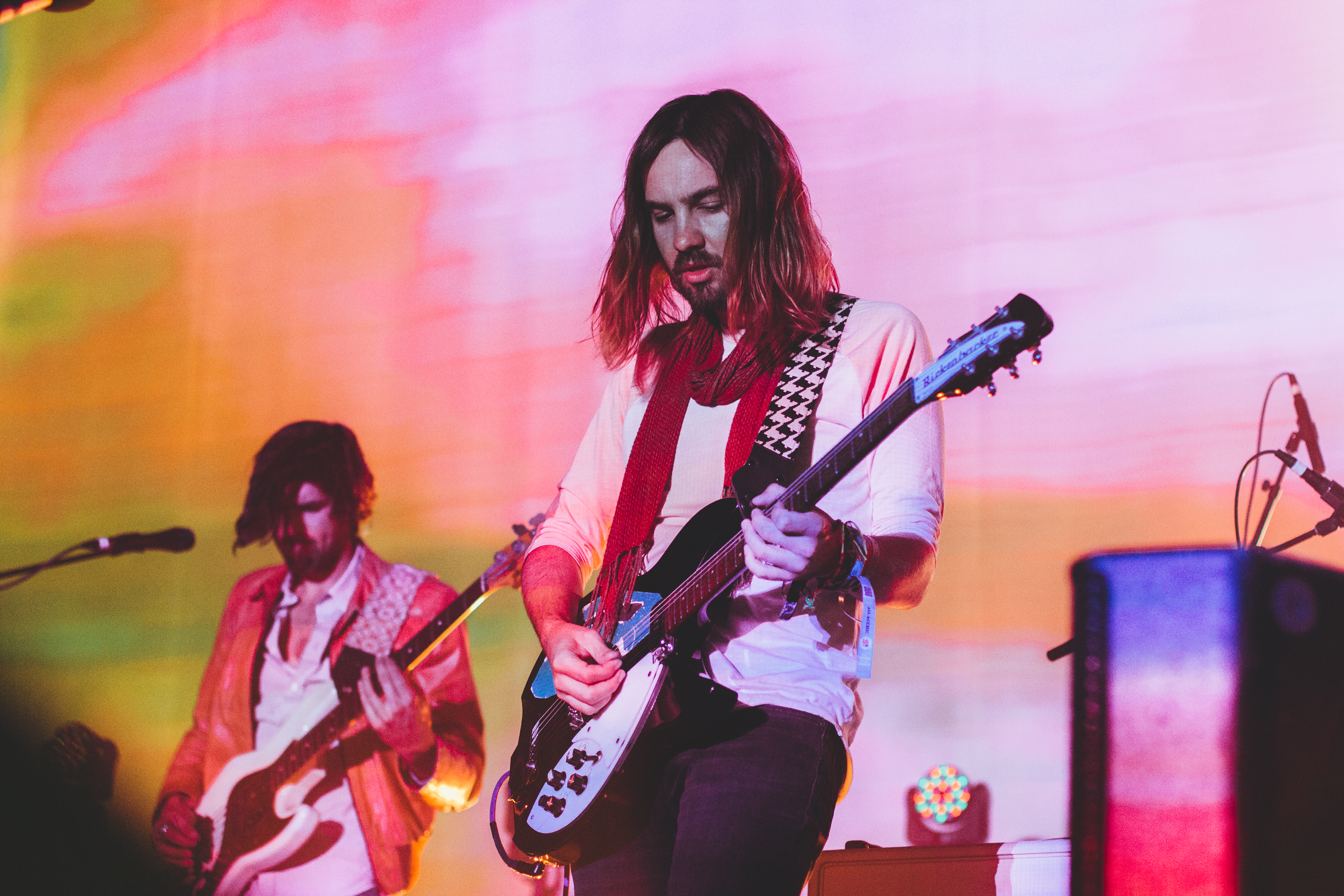
Cam Avery and Parker, performing with Tame Impala in June 2014

Work on the next Tame Impala album Lonerism had already started before Innerspeaker was even released. Lonerism was released on 5 October 2012 to widespread critical acclaim, winning many Album of the Year awards from the likes of NME, Rolling Stone, and Triple J. Lonerism marks an extension of Parker's music, featuring synths and poppier melodies, and also a more lavish, lush and expansive sound. Commenting on the new-found sound, Parker said that "[Lonerism] will be the kind of music that I felt as though I wanted to make during Innerspeaker, but I felt that it was too much of a jump. Back when I was doing Innerspeaker, I felt like I should make an album with only guitars, and use no synths, because I felt like it was a compromise to what we do. But I now know that it's not." At the ARIA Music Awards of 2015 he won two trophies, Engineer of the Year and Producer of the Year, for his work on Tame Impala's Currents (July 2015); the group won three further categories at the ceremony: Album of the Year, Best Group and Best Rock Album. On 30 March 2019, the band performed live on Saturday Night Live. On 13 April 2019 Tame Impala, performed as a headlining act of the Coachella Valley Music and Arts Festival. On 28 June 2019, the group performed as the Other Stage headliner at the Glastonbury Festival. The fourth album under the Tame Impala project, The Slow Rush, was released on 14 February 2020. The fifth studio album, Deadbeat, was released on 17 October 2025.

=== Pond ===
Parker joined Pond live on drums in late 2009 after being recruited by fellow Tame Impala members Jay Watson and Nick Allbrook. Parker later joined Pond in the studio on drums for the album Beard, Wives, Denim, and also produced it, putting his distinctive production sound on the album. Cameron Avery later filled in for Parker live on Pond's 2012 tour, while Parker was putting the finishing touches on the second Tame Impala album, Lonerism. On 28 June 2012, Parker joined Pond for a one-off performance with legendary Can frontman Damo Suzuki. Parker played drums and later played guitar for the one-off, totally improvised performance with one of his musical idols, Suzuki. Parker has also produced the Pond albums Hobo Rocket, Man It Feels Like Space Again, The Weather and Tasmania.

=== Mink Mussel Creek ===
In 2005, Parker, along with other musical companions, including Tame Impala member, Nick Allbrook and Shiny Joe Ryan, formed Mink Mussel Creek. Initially Parker was recruited as a guitarist with founding member Sam Devenport on the drums. However Sam would leave the band in 2007 and Parker moved onto the drums. Parker's drumming was a strong feature of the band's sound, which in turn propelled the Mink Mussel Creek brand of "heavy psych" forward. Mink Mussel Creek slowly built up a fanbase in Perth and was a popular live act.

In 2008, after receiving a AUD$10,000 government grant, Mink Mussel Creek recorded its first album. However, due to circumstances out of the band's control, primarily concerning a problematic producer and dysfunctional recording process, the album was never released;^{[subjective citation]} the album was eventually leaked on the internet under the title Kingdom Tapes, and the band members went their separate ways with other musical projects.

In 2011, Mink Mussel Creek reformed; Parker produced and played drums on Mink Mussel Manticore, an album that was recorded live over the course of a week at local Fremantle venue, the Norfolk Basement. It was later released on USB wristband. As of 2015, the album has been re-released online as well as on vinyl.

=== Melody's Echo Chamber ===
In 2012, Parker teamed up with French singer and then girlfriend, Melody Prochet, for her dream pop psychedelic project, Melody's Echo Chamber. The two met after Prochet gave Parker a CD with songs from her other band, My Bee's Garden. This led to a support slot for My Bee's Garden, opening for Tame Impala. Their collaborative self-titled album was released on 2 October 2012, to critical acclaim. Allmusic's Tim Sendra called it "a rather stunning debut". Parker played drums and bass guitar, and also a guitar solo on the track 'I Follow You', featuring his distinctive spacey, phased guitar sound with Prochet's dreamy vocals, and also produced the album.

=== Other collaborations ===
Space Lime Peacock were a short-lived psychedelic funk band, formed in 2008, that featured Parker in various roles, such as on drums, backing vocals, guitar and bass. Space Lime Peacock also featured Jay Watson and Nick Allbrook of Tame Impala. They recorded an album's worth of demos, which never saw an official release, but were leaked on the internet. Parker's developing and distinct guitar tones can be heard on the demos.

Parker has collaborated with Australian electronic duo, Canyons, on various occasions throughout Tame Impala's existence. Canyons have remixed many Tame Impala songs, and in 2011 Parker repaid the favour by contributing vocals on the songs "Tonight" and "When I See You Again" on their album Keep Your Dreams. A bearded Parker also appeared in their music video for 'When I See You Again', for a shot where Parker has been cloned many times on an outdoor staircase.

Parker later spoke of how his musical relationship with Canyons came to be: "They used to run a label which Tame Impala used to sort of be on. We released a 12" vinyl with them once, on one side it had three Tame Impala songs and on the other it was the same three songs remixed by Canyons and that was really cool, it was a really casual relationship. We always talked about releasing things but we never got round to it because I'd just go round to his house and talk about music for a while. So we never actually got anything pressed until we had signed with Modular and then we went back and did stuff with Canyons."

In 2013, Parker collaborated with the French electronic duo Discodeine for their track '"Aydin", from their EP Aydin. Parker provided vocals for the track. Also in 2013, Parker revealed that a new musical project involving French drummer (and Tame Impala live drummer) Julien Barbagallo, called Relation Longue Distance (which translates in English to "long-distance relationship"), had formed. After playing some small shows in France, they hope to play some more shows, with the possibility of an official release.

Parker and Cam Avery formed the psychedelic funk/space rock band Kevin Spacey (a play on words, using Parker's first name with the space rock music they played to form the actor's name) on 22 July 2013. The band featured Parker on drums, Avery on bass and fellow Perth musician Cam Parkin on keys. The band was formed as a fundraiser for another Perth musician and close friend Felicity Groom who had her car stolen. Their set featured five improvised jams with Groom joining them on vocals for one of the jams. A full video of the gig emerged on YouTube, which was filmed by an old musical acquaintance of Parker's. Kevin Spacey played their second gig under the name of The Golden Triangle Municipal Funk Band on 21 December 2013, where live video emerged of a song (later known to be "Daffodils") that featured Parker on drums, and guitar played by former front man of Perth band The Chemist, Ben Witt. The group changed their name once again to AAA Aardvark Getdown Services, where they were they played on 22 February 2014 at a gig organised by local record label Spinning Top, alongside fellow Perth acts Pond, The Silents, Felicity Groom and Peter Bibby. There is also live video, from the same YouTube channel responsible for the previous gig videos, which features most of the group's set.

Parker also mixed French psychedelic rock band Moodoïd's self-titled EP and debut album "Le Monde Möö". Moodoïd is a musical project from Pablo Padovani, the live guitarist for Melody's Echo Chamber.

Parker collaborated with Mark Ronson for the tracks "Summer Breaking", "Daffodils" and "Leaving Los Feliz" on Ronson's album Uptown Special. "Daffodils" premiered on 11 November 2014, which was primarily written by Parker and performed with his funk/disco band AAA Aardvark Getdown Services in late 2013 and early 2014.

Parker produced Perth hip hop/nu jazz septet Koi Child's debut album, with the debut single "Slow One" released on 11 November 2014. Parker discovered them when "two local groups – electronic hip-hop trio Child's Play and nu-jazz quartet Kashikoi – decided to get together for an experimental jam night at X-wray Cafe in Fremantle", with Parker in attendance. This gig landed Koi Child a supporting slot for Tame Impala on Rottnest Island.

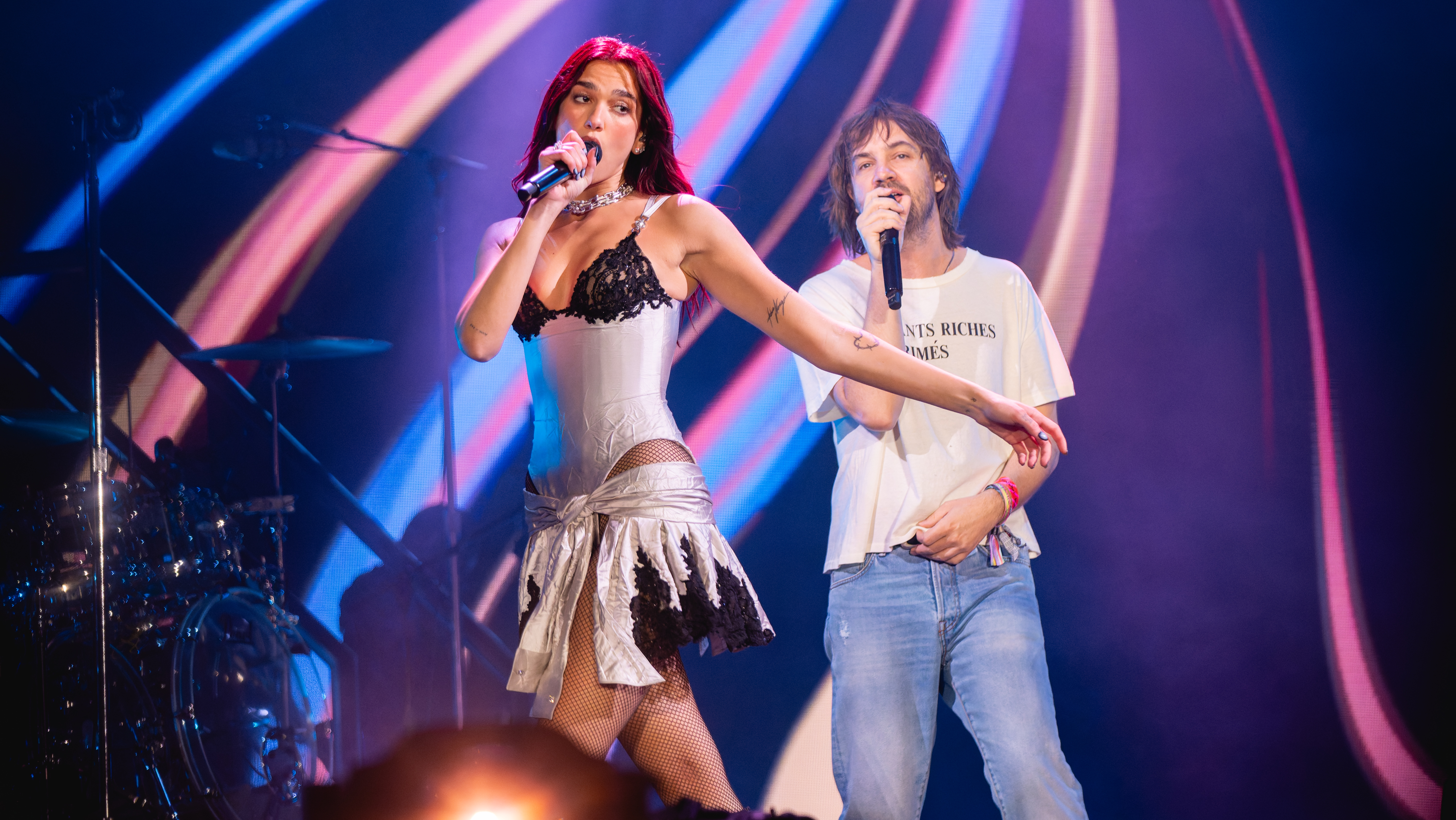
Parker performing with Dua Lipa at the Glastonbury Festival 2024

In 2016, Parker remixed Miguel's "Waves" on the singer's EP, "Rogue Waves". He also did a remix of friend and bandmate Julien Barbagallo's track, "Longue la nuit".

Parker worked with Lady Gaga on her 2016 album Joanne. The lead single, "Perfect Illusion", is a collaboration between Parker, Gaga, Mark Ronson and BloodPop.

In 2018, Parker collaborated with Kali Uchis on the song "Tomorrow" for her debut album Isolation.

In May 2021, Parker thanked fans after his hit song "The Less I Know the Better", reached over one billion streams across all major streaming services.

At All Points East in August 2022, Parker was brought on stage alongside Bootie Brown by Gorillaz front man Damon Albarn to perform a new Gorillaz song. The song titled "New Gold" was released as a single later that same month and would be featured on Gorillaz's 2022 album Cracker Island.

In April 2023, Thundercat and Tame Impala released a song titled "No More Lies". The song would later be put onto Thundercat's 2026 album Distracted.

The 2023 movie Barbie soundtrack featured the song "Journey to the Real World" by Tame Impala.

In 2024, Parker collaborated with electronic band Justice on their 2024 album Hyperdrama. Parker was featured on the tracks "One Night/All Night" and "Neverender".

Parker worked with Dua Lipa on her 2024 album Radical Optimism. He helped write and produce many of the songs on the album, most notably the songs "Houdini", "Illusion", and "Training Season". In March 2025, Dua Lipa would also bring out Tame Impala to perform his song "The Less I Know the Better" at a show in Sydney.

In 2026, Parker, alongside SZA and King Gizzard & the Lizard Wizard, collaborated once again with Justice on the song "Flower In a Hurricane" for Grand Theft Auto VI: The Album, the official soundtrack album for the video game Grand Theft Auto VI.

== Business interests ==
In July 2024, Parker collaborated with the French luxury apparel company A.P.C. on a Tame Impala collection of clothing imbued with "psychedelic minimalism".

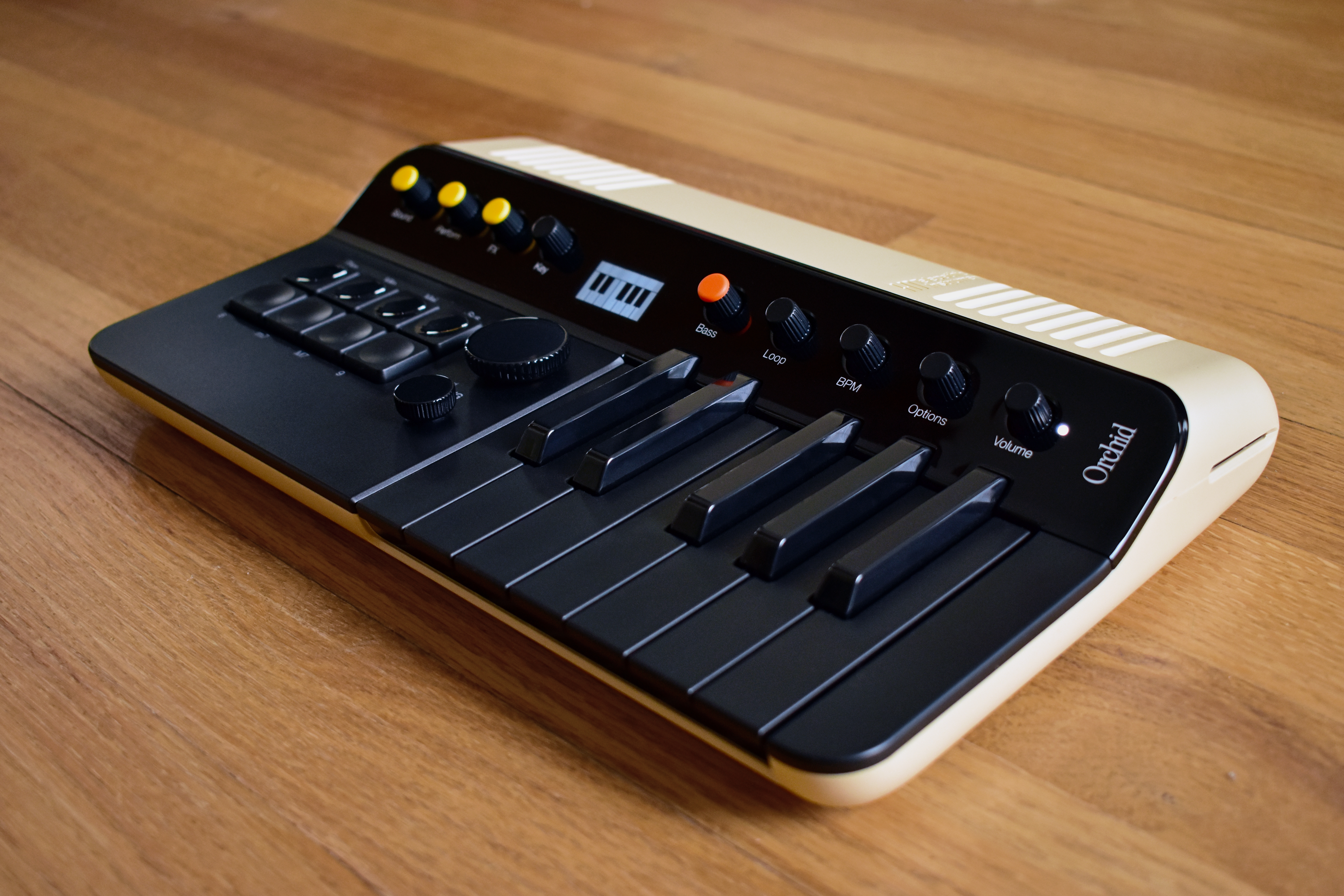
The Orchid, a music synthesiser conceived by Parker and developed by Telepathic Instruments, a company co-founded by him

In 2024, it was announced that Parker had co-founded the company Telepathic Instruments with Ignacio Germade, Chris Adams, Charl Laubscher, and Tom Cosm. In November, the company announced a musical synthesiser called the Orchid, based on an idea that Parker had conceived of more than a decade prior. A portable instrument with built-in speakers and a rechargeable battery, it allows players to generate chords using a single-octave keyboard, chord type buttons, and a voicing dial. The first 1,000 units went on sale in December 2024 and shipped in February 2025, followed by an additional 3,000 units going on sale in May and a wider public release in October. According to Telepathic Instruments, the company sold over 10,000 units and earned A$12 million in revenue as of February 2026.

== Musical equipment and sound ==
Parker's sound is heavily reliant on various effects pedals to achieve his distinctive guitar tones. The following is a list of Parker's guitars and effects pedals.

=== Guitars ===
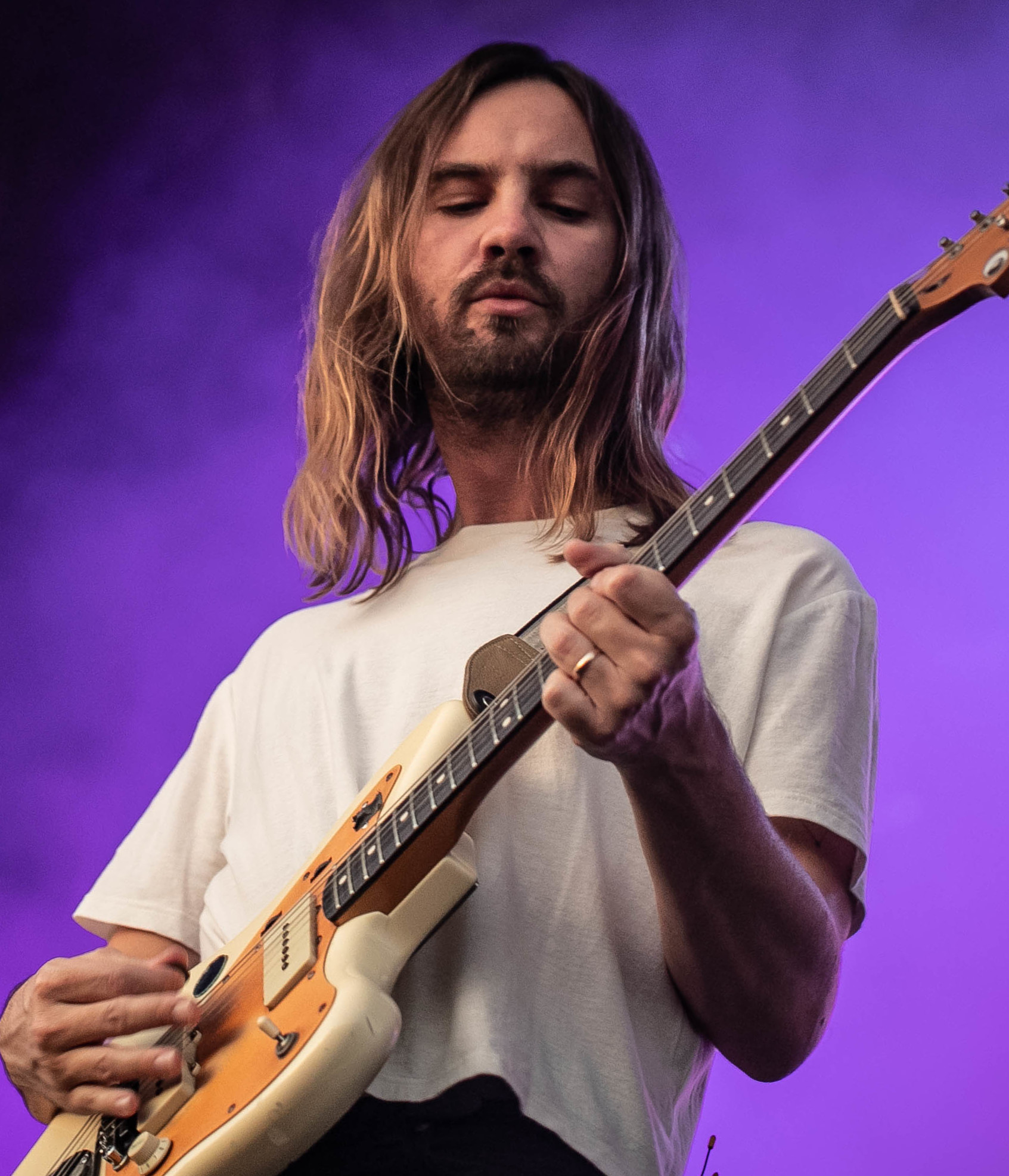
Parker performing live on a Fender Squier J Mascis Jazzmaster in 2019

Parker tunes his guitars down two semitones to D standard to relieve the tension on the strings and to experiment with the different sounds the tuning offers.

- Fender Roadhouse Stratocaster – arctic white with brown shell pickguard and a rosewood fretboard – Parker's primary guitar, used in the studio and live from 2008 to 2015. It appears that Parker has stopped using this live guitar as it has been damaged, although it was used to record Currents, as seen in promotional videos of the album. The guitar is equipped with a MIDI pickup.
- Rickenbacker 335 From 1967 in the colour of Jetglo with toaster pickups – Parker Bought this guitar in 2009 shortly after finishing recording of Innerspeaker. As of 2012, this is Parker's primary guitar.
- Hagström Impala – purchased by Parker in 2010 and used frequently in conjunction with his Stratocaster. Has been used live by Simper as of 2012.
- Epiphone Les Paul – tobacco sunburst – seen live with The Dee Dee Dums in 2006–2007 and during Innerspeaker recording, not seen since.
- Fender Squier J Mascis Jazzmaster – Parker credits his Fender Jazzmaster's custom guitar synthesizer for the synth-like sounds on Currents, claiming the pickups make the guitar sound more like a synthesizer.
- Fender Stratocaster – sunburst (finish) – first seen in 2018, used live for "Sundown Syndrome", Innerspeaker era songs, "The Less I Know The Better" and "Love/Paranoia". Also used for the recording of Tame Impala's 4th album. The guitar has been seen during the live performance of "Patience" on Saturday Night Live 30 March 2019. It is unclear the exact model of his new Stratocaster. Parker mentioned that this guitar was destroyed by a wildfire in 2020 and he has been seen with a new American Professional II Stratocaster in 2021.

=== Effects pedals ===
These are the effects pedals that Parker has been seen with in his pedal board as of 2011:

- TC Electronic PolyTune
- Boss TU-3 Tuner Pedal
- Boss AB-2 2-Way Selector
- Electro-Harmonix Holy Grail Reverb Pedal
- Electro-Harmonix Holy Grail Nano Reverb Pedal
- Boss BD-2 Blues driver
- Dunlop DVP1 Volume Pedal
- Boss VE-20 Vocal Performer
- Boss FV-50L Volume Pedal
- Boss FS-5U Footswitch
- Dunlop Cry Baby Wah Pedal
- Dunlop MXR Carbon Copy Analog Delay Pedal
- Dunlop MXR Dyna Comp Compression Pedal
- DOD FX25 Envelope Filter Pedal
- Electro-Harmonix Small Stone Phaser Pedal
- Dunlop Fuzz Face Fuzz Pedal
- Diamond Vibrato Pedal
- Moog MoogerFooger MF-105 MuRF
- Seymour Duncan KTG-1 rack unit
- Boss GT-100 Multi-effects Board

Essentially, the key components to Parker's pedal setup is a Small Stone phaser into a Holy Grail reverb into a Carbon Copy delay into a Dyna Comp into a Blues Driver into a Fuzz Face and then into a Diamond Vibrato (vibrato added during Lonerism-era). The reverb into a fuzz and phasers set to a slow rate are the hallmarks of Parker's guitar sound, which has influenced many modern psychedelic rock bands to have a similar setup, which Parker says "it's the most flattering thing in the world to hear a band ripping you off. I know some people get pissed off by it, but if I ever hear an artist and I can tell they're using a phaser pedal the way I do, it's a massive compliment. It makes you feel like you're making an impression, having an impact on people, which is really humbling, flattering".

=== Amplifiers ===
- Vox AC30 – typically an AC30H2 since Innerspeaker onwards
- Roland KC-150 Keyboard Amp – used alongside the AC30 for DI guitar-tones since Lonerism onwards, mostly likely used in conjunction with the Seymour Duncan KTG-1 rack unit.

=== Sound ===
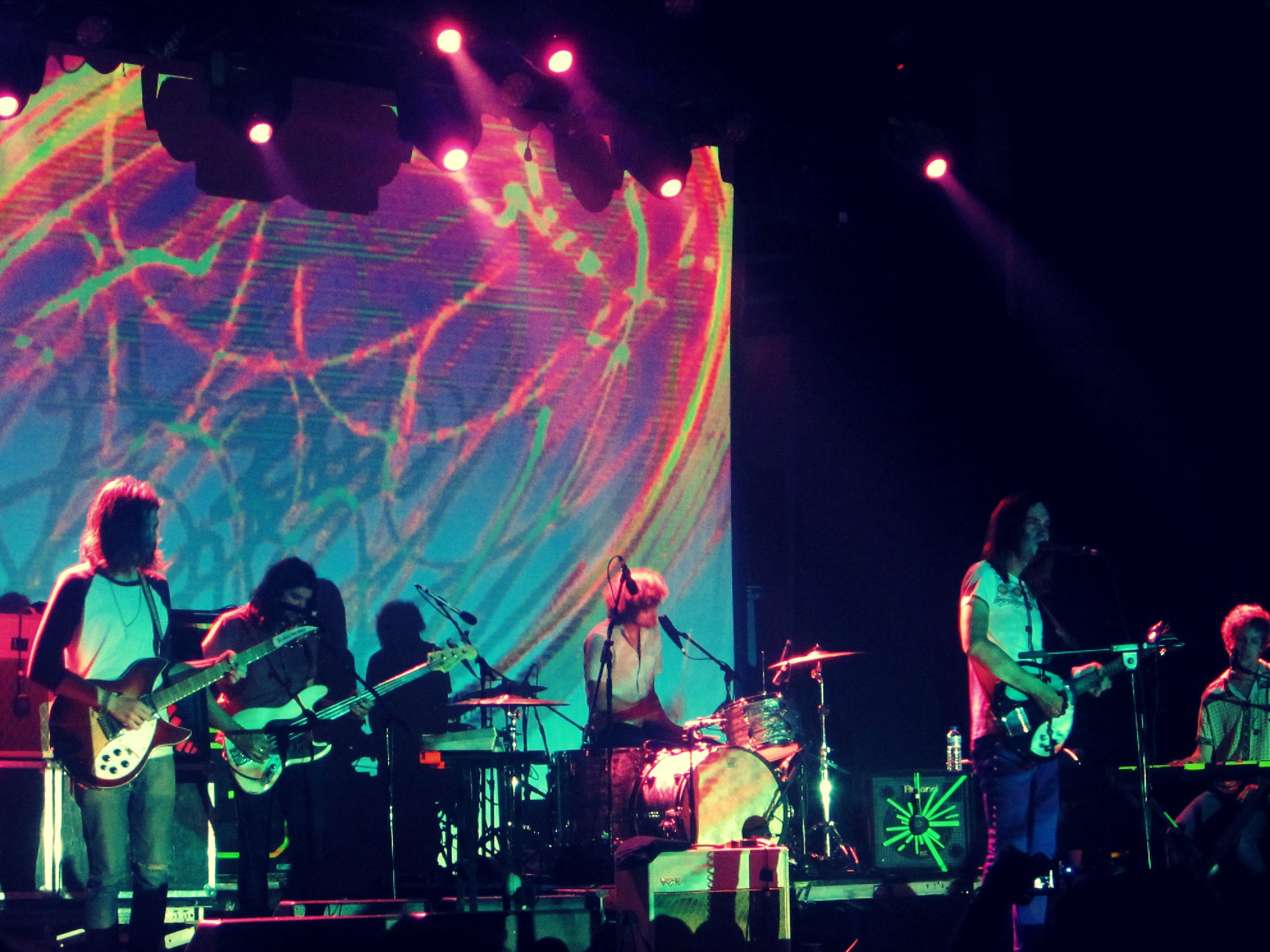
Parker's music is heavily influenced by psychedelic rock.

Parker's music is heavily influenced by psychedelic rock, psychedelic pop, and neo-psychedelia, which is achieved through various production methods. Some favoured and often-used effects by Parker include phasing, delay, reverb and fuzz.

Parker's decision to make the music for Tame Impala in the studio by himself is a result of Parker liking "the kind of music that is the result of one person constructing an awesome symphony of sound. You can layer your own voice 700 times for half a second if you want, and I just love that kind of music." However, Parker has to translate his music to a live setting with the band, and the band doesn't play the songs until they have been recorded. "The only jamming that's done as a band is done a long time after the song is recorded for the sake of the live environment. It's good for us, because we can take a song that's been recorded and do what we want to it: slow it down, speed it up, make it 10 seconds or 10 minutes long. It gives us a lot of freedom."

Experimentation with different effects pedals has led to Parker creating new and unique sounds. "If you make an effort to not put the pedals in the order you're meant to, then you'll end up with something new sounding. We don't have any things that we got from another planet or anything, it's the same things everyone else has used." "People have a distortion pedal and then a reverb pedal. A reverb is meant to make it sound like it's in a cathedral or something. If you put it the other way around, it won't sound like a guitar being played in a church, it'll sound like a church being stuffed inside a shoebox and then exploded. You can do different things just by treating things differently."

Parker also has a strong sense of melody in his music, having composed "excessively melodic music from about the age of 12 to 15". As a result of Parker's love of melody, he also has revealed that he has a "fetish for extremely sugary pop music" from artists like Britney Spears and Kylie Minogue. He particularly cited the influence of Air's Talkie Walkie, Supertramp's Breakfast in America, Michael Jackson's Thriller, Queens of the Stone Age's Rated R and Dungen's Ta Det Lugnt/4 growing up.

In addition to a love of melody, Parker also loves "fucked-up explosive cosmic music" in the vein of The Flaming Lips, whom Parker collaborated with on the track Children of the Moon in 2012, for the release The Flaming Lips and Heady Fwends.

Combining these two things, shoegaze act My Bloody Valentine have influenced Parker's music with their contrasting combination of loud guitars and ethereal melodies. Parker has "always been in love with the wall of sound as employed by My Bloody Valentine" and he tries to capture that "melancholy dreamy feel". Parker tries to incorporate this balance into his own music. "If I was singing, I wouldn't be able to match the tone of the instruments, which is really crunchy. The instruments are quite sonically brutal, but the voice is really soft, and I think that kind of resonates with people. It's kind of like My Bloody Valentine, where it's really brutal sounding, but kind of beautiful at the same time." Tame Impala live keyboardist Jay Waston has described Parker's music as containing "shoegazey guitar sound, but not played in a shoegazey manner".

Electronic music is another influence. Parker has used rock instrumentation in an electronic manner, saying "The way we do music, it's organic, but it's meant to be quite repetitive and hypnotic, almost in a kind of electronic nature. Using our playing as though it was a living sample." A heavy feature on Innerspeaker is a pitch-shifted guitar tone that many mistook for a synth. Parker mentioned this by saying "I had a few obsessions when recording Innerspeaker. One was to make the guitars sound like synths and drums sound like drum samples and pretty much anything except guitars and drums. I'm obsessed with confusing people as to the origin of a sound."

Parker was inspired to take up various creative endeavours at a young age, "I used to draw a lot when I was very young, and I used to get the most immense feeling of satisfaction from finishing a picture and looking back at it, even though I wasn't actually that good. When I started playing music I got the same feeling from making a song, even if it was just a few noises or drum patterns put together. It was all about the buzz from making something from nothing. Music always affected me greatly as a listener anyway, usually from listening to music in my dad's car or listening to him play guitar."

Parker's process for making music is "I'll have a sudden, spontaneous vision of a song, have all the parts mapped out in mind, and do my best to record it as quick as I can. I'll find my eight-track and do a quick demo of just the riff, or a verse or a chorus. The song will go for like 30 seconds. I'll have a whole bunch of them [demos] and then I'll just choose which ones to make into full songs." For Parker, the music comes before the lyrics, "I usually write the lyrics after the melody and its timing have been decided. But the words have to be meaningful. I try to synchronise certain words with the best parts of the melody, but it can be really difficult and does my head in. I like to keep the meaning pretty open and ambiguous so that it's not just me that gets something out of the lyrics. I usually write lyrics from a persona rather than tell a specific story." Parker also said "Usually I am sufficiently motivated to think of new songs every day, but I usually forget them. I seem to get an emotional kick out of sensing feelings of general desperation or hopelessness, whether it's me or someone near me or someone in a movie or anything. It's really difficult to sit down and force yourself to write a song, and that forced nature usually comes out in the song so I just have to wait until they come to me."

Lo-fi music is also a favourite of Parker's, and he incorporated it heavily in the early days of Tame Impala, heard prominently on the Tame Impala EP. With the release of Innerspeaker, Parker went for a different approach to a lo-fi sound, aiming more for a more cosmic and sonic wall of sound, helped by mixer Dave Fridmann. Parker explained "It sounds more cohesive, like an organism. It has a different emotion to it, it brings out a different feeling when it's absolutely blaring at you. I love that sound."

== Personal life ==
Parker was previously in a relationship with Melody Prochet of Melody's Echo Chamber, having produced the band's 2012 self-titled debut album. On 9 February 2019, Parker married his girlfriend Sophie Lawrence, a former schoolmate, at a vineyard in Western Australia. Their first child, a daughter, was born in 2021. Their second child, a son, was born in 2025. As of 2020, he was dividing his time between Perth and Los Angeles, where he owns a home in the Hollywood Hills.

Parker is a supporter of the Fremantle Dockers in the Australian Football League (AFL) and was named the club's number-one ticket holder on 22 May 2021. To show his appreciation for the honour, Parker recorded an original "pump-up" song for the team that is now played at Fremantle's home matches.

On 15 May 2024, Sony Music Publishing acquired Parker's entire catalog, encompassing all past and future works. The financial terms of the deal were not disclosed, but it is considered the primary factor in Parker's 2024 entry into the Australian Financial Review's Young Rich List. This acquisition includes Parker's songwriting catalog including works with Rihanna, Travis Scott and Dua Lipa.

== Discography ==
- Innerspeaker (2010)
- Lonerism (2012)
- Currents (2015)
- The Slow Rush (2020)
- Deadbeat (2025)

== Awards ==
=== APRA Awards ===
The APRA Awards are presented annually from 1982 by the Australasian Performing Right Association (APRA), "honouring composers and songwriters".

Year	Nominee / work	Award	Result	Ref.
2011	Breakthrough Songwriter of the Year	Himself	Nominated	
2013	Song of the Year	"Feels Like We Only Go Backwards"	Won	
2013	Song of the Year	"Elephant" by Tame Impala (Kevin Parker)	Nominated	
2020	Song of the Year	"Borderline" by Tame Impala (Kevin Parker)	Shortlisted	
2021	Song of the Year	"Is It True" by Tame Impala (Kevin Parker)	Shortlisted	
2021	Song of the Year	"It Might Be Time" by Tame Impala (Kevin Parker)	Shortlisted	
2021	Song of the Year	"Lost in Yesterday" by Tame Impala (Kevin Parker)	Nominated	
2021	Most Performed Alternative Work	"Lost in Yesterday" by Tame Impala (Kevin Parker)	Nominated	
2021	Himself	Songwriter of the Year	Won	
2025	"Houdini" by Dua Lipa (Kevin Parker, Dua Lipa, Caroline Ailin, Danny L Harle, Tobias Jesso Jr.)	Song of the Year	Shortlisted	
2025	"Houdini" by Dua Lipa (Kevin Parker, Dua Lipa, Caroline Ailin, Danny L Harle, Tobias Jesso Jr.)	Most Performed Pop Work	Won	
2025	"Houdini" by Dua Lipa (Kevin Parker, Dua Lipa, Caroline Ailin, Danny L Harle, Tobias Jesso Jr.)	Most Performed Australian Work	Won	
2025	"Bandit" by Don Toliver (Kevin Parker, Edgard Herrera, Sean Reid, Cody Rounds, Danny Snodgrass, Caleb Toliver)	Most Performed Hip Hop / Rap Work	Shortlisted	
2026	"End of Summer" by Tame Impala (Kevin Parker)	Song of the Year	Shortlisted	
2026	"Loser" by Tame Impala (Kevin Parker)	Song of the Year	Shortlisted	

=== ARIA Music Awards ===
The ARIA Music Awards is an annual awards ceremony that recognises excellence, innovation, and achievement across all genres of Australian music. They commenced in 1987.

Year	Nominee / work	Award	Result	Ref.
2020	Kevin Parker for Tame Impala – "Is It True"	Best Video	Nominated	
2020	Kevin Parker for Tame Impala – The Slow Rush	Album of the Year	Won	
2015	Kevin Parker for Tame Impala – Currents	Album of the Year	Won	
2013	Kevin Parker for Tame Impala – Lonerism	Album of the Year	Won	
2025	Kevin Parker for Tame Impala – "End of Summer"	Best Produced Release	Won	
2025	Kevin Parker for Tame Impala – "End of Summer"	Best Engineered Release	Won	
2026	Kevin Parker for Tame Impala – Deadbeat	Best Produced Release	Won	
2026	Kevin Parker for Tame Impala – Deadbeat	Best Engineered Release	Won	

=== MPEG Awards ===
The Music Producer and Engineers’ Guild (MPEG Awards) Awards celebrate excellence in music production and engineering in Australia. They commenced in 2024.

Year	Nominee / work	Award	Result	Ref.
2025	Charles Fisher	Writer Producer of the Year	Won	

=== West Australian Music Industry Awards ===
The West Australian Music Industry Awards are annual awards celebrating achievements for Western Australian music. They commenced in 1985.

Year	Nominee / work	Award	Result	Ref.
2011	Kevin Parker	Best Guitarist	Won	
