= Melody's Echo Chamber =

French musical project

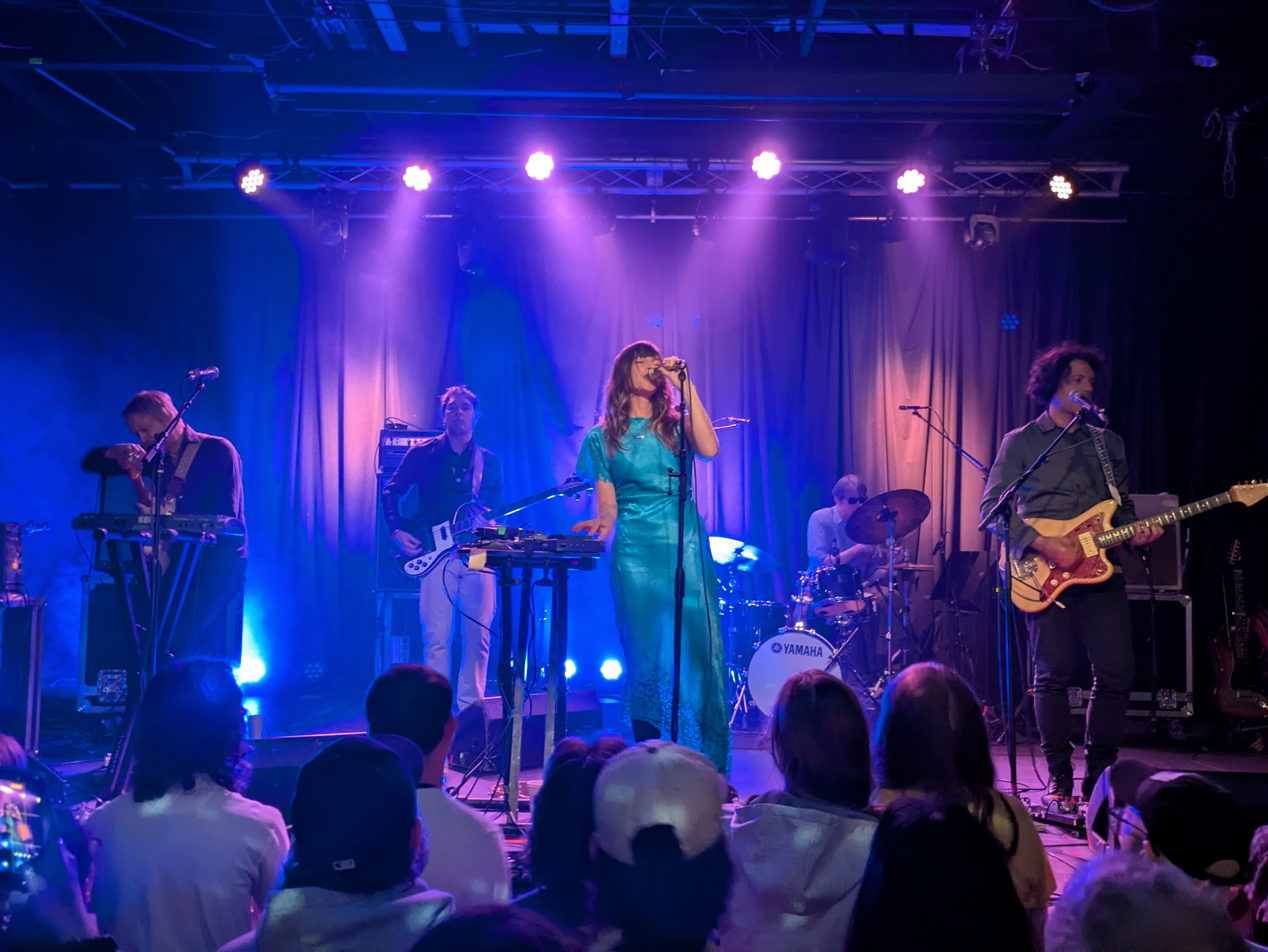
- Melody's Echo Chamber in Salt Lake City in 2026

Background information
- Origin: Aix-en-Provence, Bouches-du-Rhône, France
- Genres: Psychedelic rock; psychedelic pop; neo-psychedelia; dream pop; space rock
- Years active: 2012–present
- Labels: Fat Possum; Domino
- Members: Melody Prochet
- Website: Melody Prochet

Melody's Echo Chamber is the musical project of French musician Melody Prochet, based in Aix-en-Provence, France. The project began in 2012 following Prochet's collaboration with Australian musician Kevin Parker of Tame Impala, who produced her debut material. The project works primarily in psychedelic rock, psychedelic pop, dream pop, and neo-psychedelia.

Melody's Echo Chamber has released four studio albums: the self-titled debut Melody's Echo Chamber (2012), Bon Voyage (2018), Emotional Eternal (2022), and Unclouded (2025). A lost album, Unfold, recorded with Parker but shelved after their relationship ended, was released in 2022 alongside a reissue of the debut. The project is currently signed to Domino Recording Company.

== History ==
When Melody Prochet's previous project My Bee's Garden supported Tame Impala on their European tour in 2010, Prochet collaborated with Kevin Parker to produce her new solo material as Melody's Echo Chamber. The material was recorded in Parker's makeshift studio in Perth, Australia and Prochet's grandmother's seaside home in the south of France. The self-titled debut album was released under Fat Possum Records in 2012.

In 2013, the debut album peaked at 61 on the US Billboard Heatseekers Album Chart. Q Magazine rated the album 8/10, calling it an "intoxicating listen that's well worth experiencing for yourself." Drowned in Sound's Dom Gourlay awarded the album 9/10 and stated: "Whatever happens next, she can rest assured safe in the knowledge that together with her beau they've conjured up one of 2012's—or any other year in recent memory—finest debuts."

Melody's Echo Chamber released "Shirim" in October 2014, which was set to be featured in her next album. In December, it was announced that Melody's Echo Chamber would play at the 2015 Levitation Festival in Austin, Texas, but her appearance was later cancelled due to visa issues.

In 2017, Prochet released a new track on YouTube titled "Cross My Heart", with the announcement of her independently produced album Bon Voyage. It was set to be released in the same year, but was delayed as Prochet had suffered a "serious accident", followed by the cancellation of her world tour.

In April 2018, Prochet released the single “Breathe In, Breathe Out”, and Bon Voyage was released in June.

In January 2022, Prochet released the single "Looking Backward", and Emotional Eternal was released in April.

In September 2022, Prochet released her lost album Unfold and a reissue of her self-titled album in recognition of the tenth anniversary of her debut. Originally intended to be her sophomore album, Unfold was shelved after her relationship with co-producer Kevin Parker "just didn't make it through the process."

In 2023, Prochet released the single "Le Temple Volant" with American psychedelic pop band Crumb.

In September 2025, Melody's Echo Chamber announced her fourth studio album, Unclouded. It was released on December 5, 2025 under Domino Recording Company.

== Discography ==
=== Albums ===
- Melody's Echo Chamber (2012)
- Bon Voyage (2018)
- Emotional Eternal (2022)
- Unclouded (2025)

=== Compilation albums ===
- Unfold (2022)

=== Singles ===
- "Endless Shore" (2012)
- "I Follow You" (2012)
- "Crystallized (changed from ‘A Play on Pacman’" (2013)
- "Some Time Alone, Alone" (2013)
- "Shirim" (2014)
- "Cross My Heart" (2017)
- "Breathe In, Breathe Out" (2018)
- "Desert Horse" (2018)
- "Looking Backward" (2022)
- "Personal Message" (2022)
- "Alma" (2022)
- "Unfold" (2022)
- "Le Temple Volant" (2023) (with Crumb)
- "Daisy" (2025)
- "In the Stars" (2025)
- "Eyes Closed" (2025)
- "The House That Doesn't Exist" (2025)

=== Music videos ===
- "I Follow You" (2012)
- "You Won't Be Missing That Part Of Me" (2012)
- "Crystallized" (2013)
- "Some Time Alone, Alone" (2013)
- "Breathe In, Breathe Out" (2018)
- "Desert Horse" (2018)
- "Cross My Heart" (2018)
- "Shirim" (2018)
- "Looking Backward" (2022)
- "Personal Message" (2022)
- "Alma" (2022)
- "In the Stars" (2025)

Music videos for "Breathe In, Breathe Out", "Desert Horse", and "Cross My Heart" are fully animated and in the same style.
