= List of awards and nominations received by Mark Ronson =

Accolades of English musician Mark Ronson

Mark Ronson awards and nominations
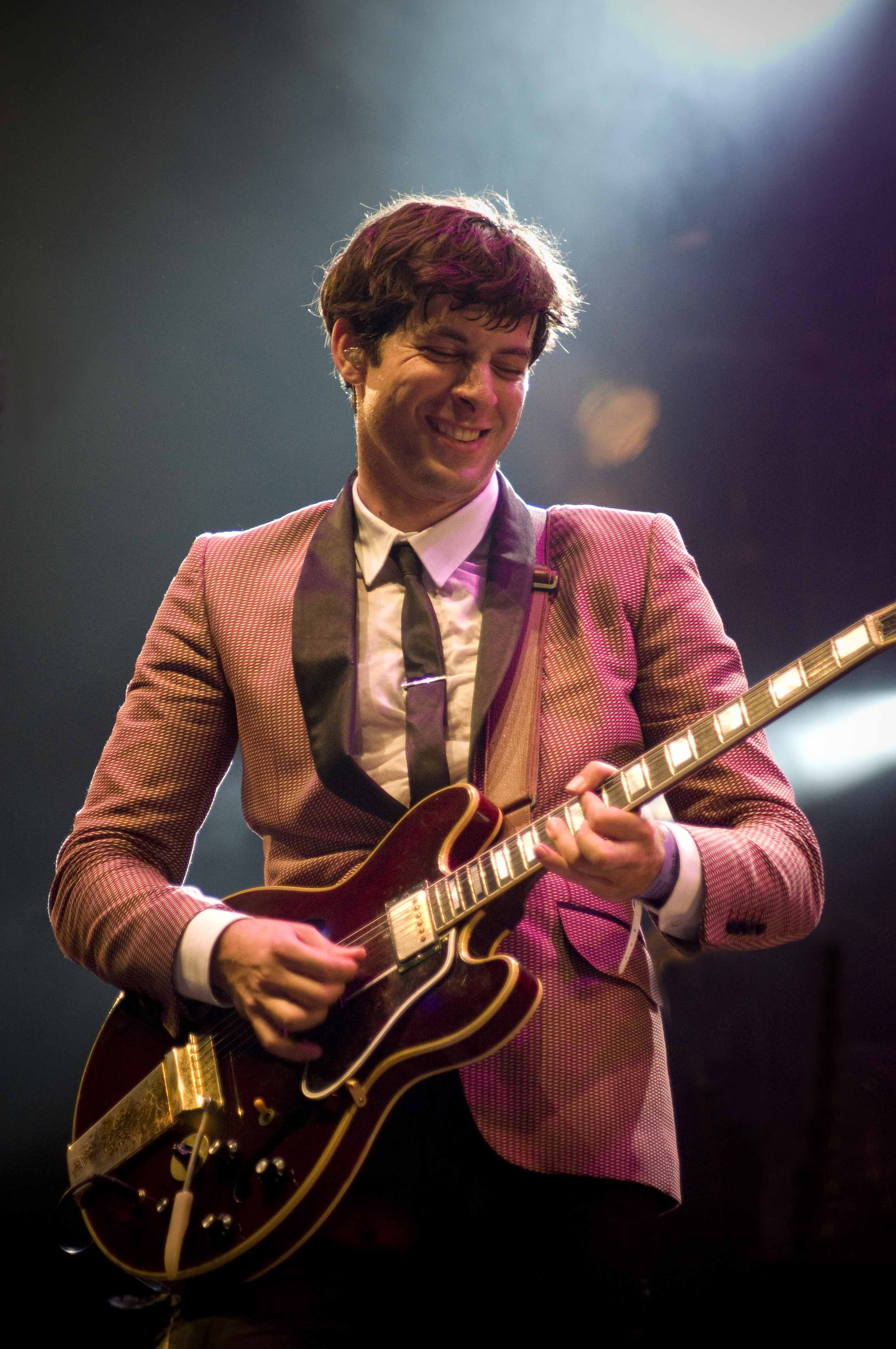
- Ronson performing at the 2008 North Sea Jazz Festival
Awards and nominations
Award	Wins	Nominations
Academy Awards	1	2
American Music Awards	0	2
ARIA Music Awards	0	1
APRA Awards	1	1
BBC Music Awards	0	1
BET Awards	0	2
Billboard Music Awards	0	3
BMI Pop Awards	6	6
BMI London Awards	2	2
Brit Awards	2	8
Critics' Choice Movie Awards	2	3
Daytime Emmy Awards	0	1
Georgia Film Critics Association	1	1
Golden Globe Awards	1	3
Grammy Awards	9	19
Guinness World Records	1	1
GQ Men of The Year	1	1
Houston Film Critics Society	1	1
iHeartRadio Music Awards	1	2
Los Angeles Online Film Critics Society	1	1
LOS40 Music Awards	0	1
MelOn Music Awards	1	1
MOBO Awards	0	4
MTV Europe Music Awards	0	2
MTV Millennial Awards	0	1
MTV Video Music Awards	1	5
MTV Japan Music Awards	0	1
NME Awards	0	1
Premios Juventud	0	1
Primetime Emmy Awards	0	1
Soul Train Music Awards	2	5
Teen Choice Awards	0	3
Telehit Awards	1	1
UK Music Video Awards	1	1

Totals (Note: Certain award groups do not simply award one winner. They acknowledge several different recipients, have runners-up, and have third place. Since this is a specific recognition and is different from losing an award, runner-up mentions are considered wins in this award tally. For simplification and to avoid errors, each award in this list has been presumed to have had a prior nomination.)
- Wins: 46
- Nominations: 128

This is a list of awards and nominations received by English musician, DJ, songwriter and record producer Mark Ronson.

Ronson came to prominence in later 2000s as a music producer for Christina Aguilera, Robbie Williams, and Amy Winehouse's second and last studio album Back to Black, winning three Grammy Awards – Producer of the Year, Non-Classical, Best Pop Vocal Album while its lead single "Rehab" won Record of the Year. In the same years he published two studio album Here Comes the Fuzz (2003) and Version (2007), receiving a nomination at the MTV Europe Music Awards and being recognized with the Brit Award for British Male Solo Artist.

In 2010, he released his third studio album, Record Collection. He was later nominated for Record of the Year at the 56th Annual Grammy Awards for producing American singer Bruno Mars' single "Locked Out of Heaven". Ronson's fourth studio album, Uptown Special (2015) promoted by the collaboration "Uptown Funk" with Bruno Mars. The songs gave Ronson several awards nominations, winning for "Uptown Funk" at the Brit Awards, the MTV Video Music Awards, the Soul Train Music Awards, and the Grammy Awards.

In 2016, Ronson received his seventh Grammy Award nomination at the 59th Annual Grammy Awards in the category Best Compilation Soundtrack for Visual Media for producing the soundtrack to the documentary Amy. In 2018, Ronson formed the duo Silk City with fellow producer Diplo, producing the single "Electricity" featuring Dua Lipa, being nominated at the Grammy Award for Best Dance Recording. In 2019 he published his fifth studio album Late Night Feelings promoted by "Nothing Breaks Like a Heart" with Miley Cyrus, which received nominees at the MTV Europe Music Awards and Brit Awards.

Since later 2010s, Ronson has begun working in the film industry, writing and producing tracks for soundtracks. In 2018 he co-wrote the song "Shallow" for the film A Star is Born winning an Academy Award, a Golden Globe Award, a Critics' Choice Movie Award, and a Satellite Award in the respective sections to the best original song. The song also won the Grammy Award for Best Song Written for Visual Media. In 2023 he wrote and produced the score of Greta Gerwig's film Barbie, receiving several critics' awards and nominations, including the Grammy Award for Best Compilation Soundtrack for Visual Media and his first Billboard Music Award for Top Soundtrack. The original songs "Dance the Night" and "I'm Just Ken" were nominated at the major film awards ceremonies, including at the 96th Academy Awards, 81st Golden Globe Awards and gave Ronson his second Critics' Choice Movie Award for Best Song.

Ronson is also a recipient of the BMI Champion Award for his contribution in the music industry. In 2016 he was nominated for the Daytime Emmy Award for Outstanding Musical Performance in a Talk Show/Morning Program for his performance on The Ellen DeGeneres Show.

== Awards and nominations ==
Award	Year	Category	Nominated work	Result	Ref.
Academy Awards	2018	Best Original Song	"Shallow" (from A Star Is Born)	Won	
Academy Awards	2023	Best Original Song	"I'm Just Ken" (from Barbie)	Nominated	
Annie Awards	2019	Outstanding Achievement for Music in an Animated Feature Production	Spies in Disguise	Nominated	
American Music Awards	2015	Song of the Year	"Uptown Funk" (featuring Bruno Mars)	Nominated	
American Music Awards	2015	Collaboration of the Year	"Uptown Funk" (featuring Bruno Mars)	Nominated	
ARIA Music Awards	2015	Best International Artist	Himself	Nominated	
APRA Music Awards	2016	International Work of the Year	"Uptown Funk" (featuring Bruno Mars)	Won	
APRA Music Awards	2020	Most Performed Most Performed International Work of the Year	"Nothing Breaks Like a Heart" (featuring Miley Cyrus)	Nominated	
The Astra Awards	2023	Best Original Song	"Dance the Night" (from Barbie)	Nominated	
The Astra Awards	2023	Best Original Song	"I'm Just Ken" (from Barbie)	Won	
Austin Film Critics Association	2023	Best Original Score	Barbie	Nominated	
BBC Music Awards	2015	Song of the Year	"Uptown Funk" (featuring Bruno Mars)	Nominated	
BET Awards	2015	Best Collaboration	"Uptown Funk" (featuring Bruno Mars)	Nominated	
BET Awards	2015	Centric Award	"Uptown Funk" (featuring Bruno Mars)	Nominated	
Billboard Music Awards	2015	Top Digital Song	"Uptown Funk" (featuring Bruno Mars)	Nominated	
Billboard Music Awards	2016	Top Radio Song	"Uptown Funk" (featuring Bruno Mars)	Nominated	
Billboard Music Awards	2016	Top Streaming Song (Video)	"Uptown Funk" (featuring Bruno Mars)	Nominated	
Billboard Music Awards	2023	Top Soundtrack	Barbie the Album	Won	
BMI Pop Awards	2008	Award Winning Songs	"Hurt"	Won	
BMI Pop Awards	2016	Award Winning Songs	"Uptown Funk" (featuring Bruno Mars)	Won	
BMI Pop Awards	2016	Song of the Year	"Uptown Funk" (featuring Bruno Mars)	Won	
BMI Pop Awards	2018	Champion Award	Himself	Won	
BMI Pop Awards	2020	Award Winning Songs	"Electricity"	Won	
BMI Pop Awards	2024	Award Winning Songs	"Dance the Night" (from Barbie)	Won	
BMI London Awards	2016	Award Winning Songs	"Uptown Funk" (featuring Bruno Mars)	Won	
BMI London Awards	2018	Award Winning Songs	"Million Reasons"	Won	
Brit Awards	2008	British Male Solo Artist	Himself	Won	
Brit Awards	2008	British Single of the Year	"Valerie" (featuring Amy Winehouse)	Nominated	
Brit Awards	2008	British Album of the Year	Version	Nominated	
Brit Awards	2011	British Male Solo Artist	Himself	Nominated	
Brit Awards	2015	British Single of the Year	"Uptown Funk" (featuring Bruno Mars)	Won	
Brit Awards	2015	British Video of the Year	"Uptown Funk" (featuring Bruno Mars)	Nominated	
Brit Awards	2016	British Male Solo Artist	Himself	Nominated	
Brit Awards	2016	British Producer of the Year	Himself	Nominated	
Brit Awards	2020	Song of the Year	"Nothing Breaks Like a Heart" (featuring Miley Cyrus)	Nominated	
Brit Awards	2026	Outstanding Contribution to Music	Himself	Won	
Chicago Film Critics Association	2023	Best Score	Barbie	Nominated	
Critics' Choice Movie Awards	2018	Best Song	"Shallow" (from A Star Is Born)	Won	
Critics' Choice Movie Awards	2023	Best Song	"Dance the Night" (from Barbie)	Nominated	
Critics' Choice Movie Awards	2023	Best Song	"I'm Just Ken" (from Barbie)	Won	
Critics' Choice Movie Awards	2023	Best Score	Barbie	Nominated	
Daytime Emmy Awards	2016	Outstanding Musical Performance in a Talk Show/Morning Program	Mark Ronson and Bruno Mars on The Ellen DeGeneres Show	Nominated	
Dorian Awards	2024	Film Music of the Year	Barbie	Won	
Georgia Film Critics Association	2018	Best Original Song	"Shallow" (from A Star Is Born)	Won	
Georgia Film Critics Association	2023	Best Original Song	"I'm Just Ken" (from Barbie)	Runner-up	
Golden Globe Awards	2018	Best Original Song	"Shallow" (from A Star Is Born)	Won	
Golden Globe Awards	2023	Best Original Song	"Dance the Night" (from Barbie)	Nominated	
Golden Globe Awards	2023	Best Original Song	"I'm Just Ken" (from Barbie)	Nominated	
Grammy Awards	2007	Album of the Year	Back to Black	Nominated	
Grammy Awards	2007	Record of the Year	"Rehab"	Won	
Grammy Awards	2007	Best Pop Vocal Album	Back to Black	Won	
Grammy Awards	2007	Producer of the Year, Non-Classical	Himself	Won	
Grammy Awards	2013	Record of the Year	"Locked Out of Heaven"	Nominated	
Grammy Awards	2015	Record of the Year	"Uptown Funk"	Won	
Grammy Awards	2015	Best Pop Duo/Group Performance	"Uptown Funk"	Won	
Grammy Awards	2015	Best Pop Vocal Album	Uptown Special	Nominated	
Grammy Awards	2016	Best Compilation Soundtrack for Visual Media	Amy	Nominated	
Grammy Awards	2018	Song of the Year	"Shallow"	Nominated	
Grammy Awards	2018	Best Dance Recording	"Electricity"	Won	
Grammy Awards	2018	Best Song Written for Visual Media	"Shallow"	Won	
Grammy Awards	2022	Album of the Year	Special	Nominated	
Grammy Awards	2023	Song of the Year	"Dance the Night"	Nominated	
Grammy Awards	2023	Best Compilation Soundtrack for Visual Media	Barbie the Album	Won	
Grammy Awards	2023	Best Score Soundtrack Album for Visual Media	Barbie	Nominated	
Grammy Awards	2023	Best Song Written for Visual Media	"Dance the Night" (from Barbie the Album)	Nominated	
Grammy Awards	2023	Best Song Written for Visual Media	"I'm Just Ken" (from Barbie the Album)	Nominated	
Grammy Awards	2024	Best Remixed Recording	"Espresso" (Working Late remix) (with FnZ)	Won	
Guild of Music Supervisors Awards	2018	Best Song Written and/or Recording Created for a Film	"Shallow" (from A Star Is Born)	Won	
Guild of Music Supervisors Awards	2023	Best Song Written and/or Recording Created for a Film	"I'm Just Ken" (from Barbie)	Nominated	
Guinness World Records	2017	Most weeks at No.1 on the U.S. Digital Song Sales	"Uptown Funk" (featuring Bruno Mars)	Won	
Hawaii Film Critics Society	2023	Best Original Score	Barbie	Won	
Hollywood Music in Media Awards	2018	Best Original Song in a Feature Film	"Shallow" (from A Star Is Born)	Won	
Hollywood Music in Media Awards	2023	Best Original Score in a Sci-Fi/Fantasy Film	Barbie	Nominated	
Hollywood Music in Media Awards	2023	Best Original Song in a Feature Film	"I'm Just Ken" (from Barbie)	Nominated	
Houston Film Critics Society	2018	Best Original Song	"Shallow" (from A Star Is Born)	Won	
Houston Film Critics Society	2023	Best Original Song	"Dance the Night" (from Barbie)	Nominated	
Houston Film Critics Society	2023	Best Original Song	"I'm Just Ken" (from Barbie)	Won	
iHeartRadio Music Awards	2016	"Uptown Funk" (feat. Bruno Mars)	Song of the Year	Nominated	
iHeartRadio Music Awards	2016	"Uptown Funk" (feat. Bruno Mars)	Collaboration of the Year	Won	
International Film Music Critics Association	2023	Best Original Score for a Comedy Film	Barbie	Nominated	
Latino Entertainment Journalists Association	2023	Best Score	Barbie	Nominated	
Latino Entertainment Journalists Association	2023	Best Score	"Dance the Night" (from Barbie)	Nominated	
Latino Entertainment Journalists Association	2023	Best Score	"I'm Just Ken" (from Barbie)	Won	
Los Angeles Online Film Critics Society	2018	Best Original Song	"Shallow" (from A Star Is Born)	Won	
Los Angeles Online Film Critics Society	2023	Best Music	Barbie	Runner-up	
LOS40 Music Awards	2015	Best International Song	"Uptown Funk" (featuring Bruno Mars)	Nominated	
LOS40 Music Awards	2019	Best International Album	Late Night Feelings	Nominated	
LOS40 Music Awards	2019	Best International Video	"Nothing Breaks Like a Heart" (featuring Miley Cyrus)	Nominated	
MelOn Music Awards	2015	Best Pop	"Uptown Funk" (featuring Bruno Mars)	Won	
MOBO Awards	2010	Best Video	"Bang Bang Bang" (featuring Q-Tip & MNDR)	Nominated	
MOBO Awards	2010	Best Song	"Bang Bang Bang" (featuring Q-Tip & MNDR)	Nominated	
MOBO Awards	2015	Best Song	"Uptown Funk" (featuring Bruno Mars)	Nominated	
MOBO Awards	2015	Himself	Best Male Act	Nominated	
MTV Europe Music Awards	2007	Best UK & Ireland Act	Himself	Nominated	
MTV Europe Music Awards	2015	Best Song	"Uptown Funk" (featuring Bruno Mars)	Nominated	
MTV Europe Music Awards	2015	Best Collaboration	"Uptown Funk" (featuring Bruno Mars)	Nominated	
MTV Europe Music Awards	2019	Best Collaboration	"Nothing Breaks Like a Heart" (featuring Miley Cyrus)	Nominated	
MTV Millennial Awards	2015	International Hit of the Year	"Uptown Funk" (featuring Bruno Mars)	Nominated	
MTV Video Music Awards	2015	Video of the Year	"Uptown Funk" (featuring Bruno Mars)	Nominated	
MTV Video Music Awards	2015	Best Male Video	"Uptown Funk" (featuring Bruno Mars)	Won	
MTV Video Music Awards	2015	Best Pop Video	"Uptown Funk" (featuring Bruno Mars)	Nominated	
MTV Video Music Awards	2015	Best Collaboration	"Uptown Funk" (featuring Bruno Mars)	Nominated	
MTV Video Music Awards	2015	Best Direction (Directors: Bruno Mars and Cameron Duddy)	"Uptown Funk" (featuring Bruno Mars)	Nominated	
MTV Video Music Awards Japan	2015	Best Male Video – International	"Uptown Funk" (featuring Bruno Mars)	Nominated	
New York Film Critics Online Awards	2023	Best Use of Music	Barbie	Won	
NME Awards	2015	Dancefloor Filler	"Uptown Funk" (featuring Bruno Mars)	Nominated	
North Carolina Film Critics Association	2023	Best Original Song	"I'm Just Ken" (from Barbie)	Won	
North Dakota Film Society	2023	Best Original Song	"I'm Just Ken" (from Barbie)	Nominated	
Online Film Critics Society	2023	Technical Achievements: Original Song	"I'm Just Ken" (from Barbie)	Won	
Premios Juventud	2015	Favorite Hit	"Uptown Funk" (featuring Bruno Mars)	Nominated	
Primetime Emmy Awards	2025	Outstanding Variety Special (Live)	SNL50: The Homecoming Concert	Nominated	
RTHK International Pop Poll Awards	2015	Top 10 Gold International Gold Songs	"Uptown Funk" (featuring Bruno Mars)	Won	
Satellite Awards	2018	Best Original Song	"Shallow" (from A Star Is Born)	Won	
Satellite Awards	2023	Best Original Song	"I'm Just Ken" (from Barbie)	Nominated	
Saturn Awards	2023	Best Music	Barbie	Nominated	
Society of Composers & Lyricists	2023	Outstanding Original Song for a Comedy or Musical Visual Media Production	"I'm Just Ken" (from Barbie)	Nominated	
St. Louis Film Critics Association	2023	Best Music Soundtrack	Barbie	Won	
Soul Train Music Awards	2015	Song of the Year	"Uptown Funk" (featuring Bruno Mars)	Won	
Soul Train Music Awards	2015	Video of the Year	"Uptown Funk" (featuring Bruno Mars)	Won	
Soul Train Music Awards	2015	The Ashford & Simpson Songwriters Award	"Uptown Funk" (featuring Bruno Mars)	Nominated	
Soul Train Music Awards	2015	Best Dance Performance	"Uptown Funk" (featuring Bruno Mars)	Nominated	
Soul Train Music Awards	2015	Best Collaboration	"Uptown Funk" (featuring Bruno Mars)	Nominated	
Teen Choice Awards	2015	Choice Music Single: Male	"Uptown Funk" (featuring Bruno Mars)	Nominated	
Teen Choice Awards	2015	Choice Music Party Song	"Uptown Funk" (featuring Bruno Mars)	Nominated	
Teen Choice Awards	2015	Choice Music: Collaboration	"Uptown Funk" (featuring Bruno Mars)	Nominated	
Telehit Awards	2015	Song of the Year	"Uptown Funk" (featuring Bruno Mars)	Won	
UK Music Video Awards	2015	Best Pop Video – UK	"Uptown Funk" (featuring Bruno Mars)	Won	
UK Music Video Awards	2019	Best Pop Video – UK	"Nothing Breaks Like a Heart" (featuring Miley Cyrus)	Nominated	
UK Music Video Awards	2019	Best Styling in a Video	"Late Night Feelings" (featuring Lykke Li)	Nominated	
World Soundtrack Awards	2018	Best Original Song Written Directly for a Film	"Shallow" (from A Star Is Born)	Won	

== Other awards ==
- Glamour Women of the Year – Men of the Year – Winner 2008
- Vodafone Live Music Awards – Best Live Male – Winner 2008
