= Ilsey Juber =

American singer-songwriter

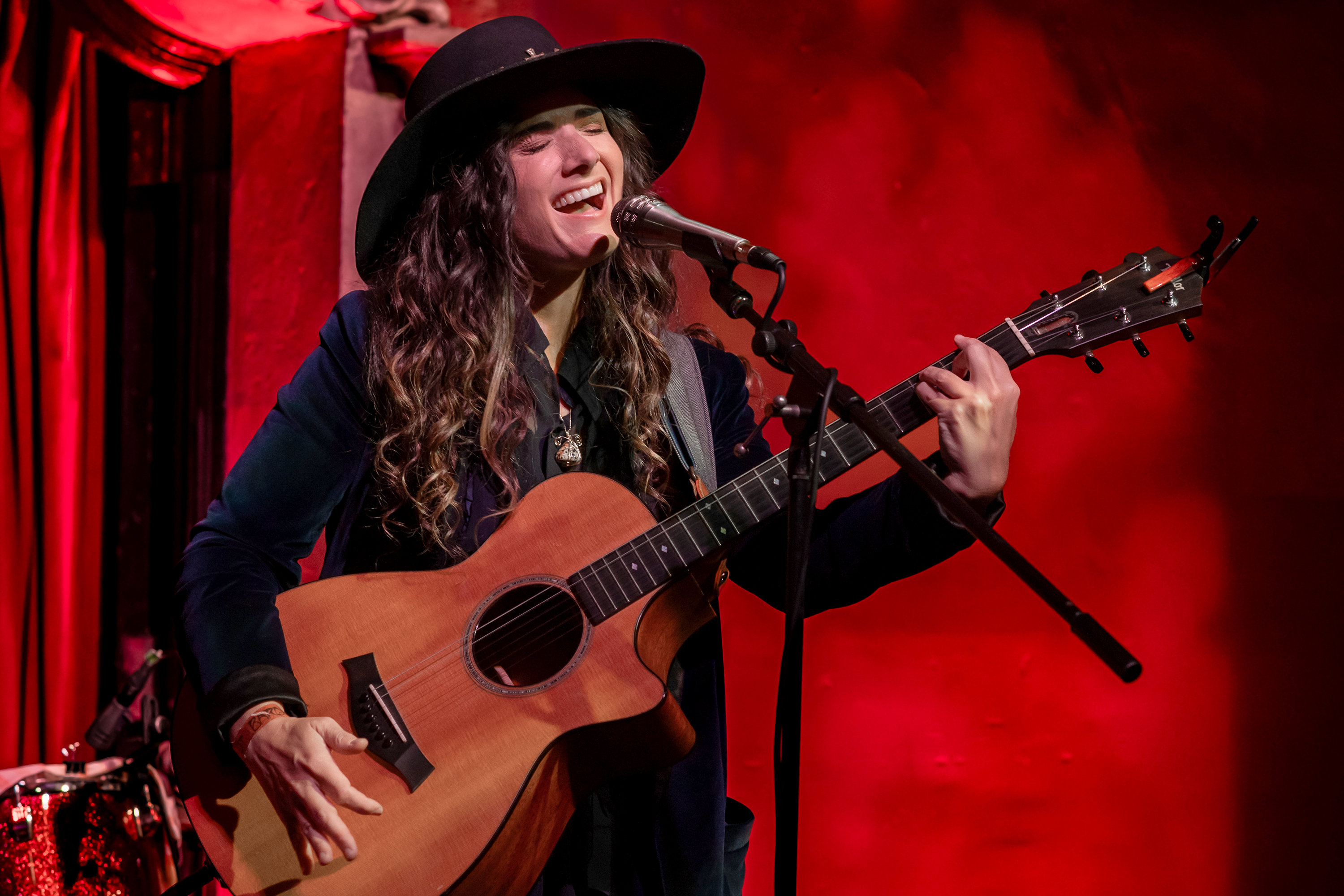

Background information
- Born: Ilsey Anna Juber; April 17, 1986 (age 40); Los Angeles, California
- Label: Elektra
- Website: www.ilsey.com

Ilsey Anna Juber (/ɪlsi dʒuːbər/, IL-see JOO-bər; born April 17, 1986) is a British-American singer and professional songwriter from Los Angeles, California. Before releasing her debut album From the Valley in 2023, Juber co-wrote songs for artists such as Beyoncé and Miley Cyrus. She also co-wrote Panic! at the Disco's hit song "High Hopes".

== Early career ==
Juber began writing songs professionally after her band, which had just signed a publishing deal with Sony, broke up.

Juber co-wrote Mark Ronson's "Nothing Breaks Like a Heart" featuring Miley Cyrus, along with much of Ronson's Late Night Feelings album with vocals featured on the track "Spinning". In 2020, she worked on "Midnight Sky" as well as two other songs from Cyrus' album, Plastic Hearts. On October 3, "Midnight Sky" hit No. 11 on the Billboard Adult Top 40. Cyrus performed her song live at the 2020 MTV Video Music Awards. Additionally, Juber co-wrote "All Night" by Beyoncé, and Panic! at the Disco's "High Hopes", which reached No. 1 on the US Hot AC, Alternative, and Top 40 radio charts. She was also a co-writer on the 2015 single "Powerful" by Major Lazer featuring Ellie Goulding. In 2018, Juber won two BMI awards for her work co-writing "Mercy" by Shawn Mendes and "In the Name of Love" by Martin Garrix and Bebe Rexha. She sings on the track "Soldier" from Stanley Clarke's 2011 Grammy for Best Contemporary Jazz Album, The Stanley Clarke Band.

In August 2017, Juber extended her publishing deal with Sony/ATV Music Publishing.

== Debut album ==
On June 23, 2023, Elektra Records announced that Juber would be releasing her first solo album, From the Valley, with that label. The album was released on October 6, 2023, and its first single was "No California".

== Family ==
Juber is the daughter of Hope and Laurence Juber, and sister to Nico Juber. Her father was the lead guitarist for the band Paul McCartney and Wings from 1978 to 1981, and is now a solo, fingerstyle guitarist. Juber's maternal grandfather was Sherwood Schwartz, the American television producer behind Gilligan’s Island and The Brady Bunch.

== Discography ==
=== Studio albums ===
- From The Valley (2023)

=== Features ===
Year	Song	Artist
2026	"Baby"	The Chainsmokers
2026	"ALL THE TIME"	John Summit, The Chainsmokers
2024	"When The Drugs Don't Work (with Ilsey)"	Jelly Roll
2024	"Evergreen (feat. Ilsey)"	Deyaz
2021	"Mimi"	Big Red Machine
2019	"Spinning (feat. Ilsey)"	Mark Ronson
2018	"Uncover You"	Fairlane
2015	"Disarm You (feat. Ilsey)"	Kaskade
2015	"Headlights (feat. Ilsey)"	Robin Schulz

=== Songwriting credits ===
indicates a credited background vocal contribution.

indicates a credited vocal/featured artist contribution.

Year	Artist	Album	Song	Co-written with
2026	Ari Abdul	The Void	"Seductive"	Ajay Bhattacharyya, Ari Abdul, Ella Boh
2026	Dove Cameron	Final Girl	"Silver Screen Baby"	Dove Cameron, Madison Love, Mark Schick
2026	Dove Cameron	Final Girl	"When in Rome"	Dove Cameron, CJ Baran, Madison Love, Mark Schick
2026	Dove Cameron	Final Girl	"Hot Girl"	Dove Cameron, Madison Love, Mark Schick, Eli Teplin
2026	Dove Cameron	Final Girl	"Skin Over Bone"	Dove Cameron, Madison Love, Mark Schick
2026	Nia Archives	Emotional Junglist	"There Goes Ma Head"	Dehaney Hunt, Ethan P. Flynn
2026	Koe Wetzel	The Night Champion	"Nowhere Fast"	Carrie K, Josh Serrato, Gabe Simon, Ropyr Wetzel
2026	Koe Wetzel	The Night Champion	"When I Was"	Carrie K, Josh Serrato, Gabe Simon, Ropyr Wetzel
2026	Nia Smith	Non-album singles	"High"	Nia Smith, Jack Rochon, Violet Skies
2026	Bebe Stockwell	Non-album singles	"Wild Love"	Bebe Stockwell
2026	Diplo	Non-album singles	"Would U Still Love Me" (featuring Cameron Whitcomb)	Thomas Wesley Pentz, Henry Agincourt Allen, Jesse Fink, Mark Schick, Gian Michael Stone
2026	Lykke Li	The Afterparty	"Famous Last Words"	Lykke Li, Jacob Olofsson
2026	Lykke Li	The Afterparty	"So Happy I Could Die"	Lykke Li, Rick Nowels
2026	Holly Humberstone	Cruel World	"Lucy"	Holly Humberstone, Rob Milton
2026	John Summit	CTRL ESCAPE	"ALL THE TIME" (featuring The Chainsmokers and Ilsey)	Jesse Fink, Alex Pall, Andrew Taggart, John Walter Schuster
2026	Jelly Roll	Non-album singles	"Thorns"	Rocky Block, Ryan Vojtesak, Jason Deford, Taylor Phillips
2026	Saint Harison	Non-album singles	"stuck"	Harrison Fisher, Dernst Emile II, Akeel Henry, Natalie Roseblade
2026	Elmiene	sounds for someone	"Lie With Me"	Abdala Elamin, Jeffy "Gitty" Gitelman
2026	Michael Marcagi	Under The Streetlights	"Anna Lee"	Michael Marcagi, Dan Wilson
2026	Mon Rovîa	Bloodline	"Bloodline"	Eli Teplin, Andrew Lowe
2026	The Castellows	Non-album singles	"Love Is A Game"	Rick Nowels
2026	Shenseea	Non-album singles	"Time For Me"	Chinsea Lee, Dernst Emile II, Theron Thomas
2025	Brett Kissel	Non-album singles	"Heart To Forget"	Parker Welling, Casey Brown
2025	FLETCHER	Would You Still Love Me If You Really Knew Me?	"D i s t a n c e"	Jennifer Decilveo, Cari Fletcher, James Ho
2025	Cil	don't hold me accountable	"forgot to be my lover"	Evan Blair, Cil
2025	Noah Rinker	The Pines	"The Pines"	Noah Rinker, Joel Little
2025	Noah Rinker	Burning Daylight	"The Bend"	Noah Rinker, Ben Johnson
2025	Sam Barber	Music for the Soul	"Dust and Smoke"	Sam Barber, Carrie K
2025	Cam	All Things Light	"Look At The Pretty Girls!"	Adriano Celentano, Camaron Ochs, Nick Lobel, Simon Maartensson, Tofer Brown
2025	Cam	All Things Light	"Hallelujah"	Anders Mouridsen, Camaron Ochs, Tyler Johnson
2025	Bailey Zimmerman	Different Night Same Rodeo	"Chevy Silverado"	Gavin Lucas, Bailey Zimmerman, Heath Warren, Tucker Beathard
2025	Bon Iver	SABLE, fABLE	"Day One" (featuring Dijon and Flock of Dimes)	Dijon Duenas, Brandon Burton, Jennifer Wasner, Justin Vernon, Samuel Tsang
2025	Bon Iver	SABLE, fABLE	"From"	Jacob Collier, Jim-E Stack, Denise Stoudmire, Justin Vernon, Michael Gordon, Tobias Jesso Jr.
2025	Bon Iver	SABLE, fABLE	"There's A Rhythmn"	Justin Vernon, Sean Carey, Eli Teplin, Jim-E Stack, Denise Stoudmire, Rob Moose
2024	Debbii Dawson	Non-album single	"The Great Magician"	Alida Garpestad Peck, Deborah Dawson, Kevin Hickey
2024	Gwen Stefani	Bouquet	"Reminders"	Gwen Stefani, Stephen McGregor
2024	Jelly Roll	Beautifully Broken (Pickin' Up The Pieces)	"Don't Want To (with Keith Urban)"	Geoff Warburton, Jason Deford, Joe Fox, Joe Reeves
2024	Jelly Roll	Beautifully Broken	"My Cross"	Geoff Warburton, Jason Deford, Joe Fox, Ryan Vojtesak
2024	Jelly Roll	Beautifully Broken	"Woman"	Geoff Warburton, Jason Deford, Joe Fox, Joe Reeves
2024	Jelly Roll	Beautifully Broken	"Time of Day"	Ashley Gorley, Brandon Allen, Colson Baker, Jason Deford, Michael Wayne Atha, Steve Basil, Zach Crowell
2024	Jelly Roll	Beautifully Broken	"Grace"	Ian Fitchuk, Ben Johnson, Jason Deford
2024	Jelly Roll	Beautifully Broken	"When The Drugs Don't Work (with Ilsey)"	Alysa Vanderheym, Hillary Lindsey, Jason Deford, Vincent Pontare
2024	Jelly Roll	Beautifully Broken	"Burning"	Ian Fitchuk, Jason Deford, Zach Crowell
2024	Phantogram	Memory Of A Day	"Jealousy"	John Hill, Josh Carter, Sarah Barthel
2024	Leon Bridges	Leon	"Simplify"	Josh Block, Todd Bridges, Jerome Castille, Austin Jenkins, Tyler Johnson, Brandon Marcel, Michael Uzowuru, Chris Vivion, Dylan Wiggins
2024	James Vincent McMorrow	Non-album single	"Glu"	James Vincent McMorrow
2024	Jamie xx	In Waves	"Waited All Night"	Alan Glass, Alesha Dixon, David Brandt, James Smith, Mary Ann Morgan, Oliver Sim, Romy Madley Croft
2024	Ben Platt	Honeymind	“Cherry On Top”	Sammy Witte, Ben Platt
2024	Sheryl Crow	Evolution	"Waiting In The Wings"	Sheryl Crow, Mike Elizondo
2024	Deyaz	Non-album singles	"Evergreen (feat. Ilsey Juber)"	Deyaz Willis-Browne, Eli Teplin, Jesse Shatkin
2024	Elmiene	Non-album singles	"Sweetness"	Abdala Elamin, Dahi, Ely Rise
2024	Rosa Linn	Non-album singles	"Universe"	Connor McDonough, Henry Walter, Riley McDonough, Rosa Linn
2023	Del Water Gap	I Miss You Already + I Haven't Left Yet	"Doll House"	S. Holden Jaffe, Sammy Witte
2023	Del Water Gap	I Miss You Already + I Haven't Left Yet	"Glitter & Honey"	S. Holden Jaffe, Sammy Witte
2023	Romy	Mid Air	"Twice"	Romy Madley Croft, Fred Gibson
2023	Ashnikko (feat. Ethel Cain)	Weedkiller	"Dying Star"	Ashton Nicole Casey, Ethel Cain, Slinger
2023	Diplo (feat. Jessie Murph & Polo G)	Non-album single	"Heartbroken"	Amy Allen, Elie Rizk, Emeric Boxall, Jessie Murph, Taurus Bartlett, Thomas Wesley Pentz
2023	6lack	Since I Have a Lover	"Testify"	Alexander Izquierdo, Stefan Johnson, Marcus Lomax, Jordan Johnson, Adeyinka Bankole, Simon Hessmann, Ricardo Valdez Valentine Jr., Joseph Reeves, Kill September, Singawd
2023	Luke Grimes	Non-album single	"Hold On"	Foy Vance
2023	A R I Z O N A	Non-album single	"Dark Skies"	David Labuguen, Nathan Esquite, Zachary Charles, PJ Bianco
2022	Olivia Dean	Messy (album)	"Danger"	Nathaniel Ledwidge, Olivia Dean, Tre-Jean Marie
2022	The 1975	Being Funny In A Foreign Language	"Oh Caroline"	Matty Healy, Benjamin Francis Leftwich, George Daniel, Jamie Squire, Jimmy Hogarth
2022	The 1975	Being Funny In A Foreign Language	"Looking For Somebody (To Love)"	Matty Healy, George Daniel, Jamie Squire
2022	Chayce Beckham	Non-album single	"Tell Me Twice"	Chayce Beckham, Ross Copperman
2022	Years & Years	Night Call	"Make It Out Alive"	Mark Ralph, Olly Alexander, Jesse Shatkin
2022	Noah Cyrus	The Hardest Part	"Hardest Part"	Noah Cyrus, Mike Crossey
2022	Noah Cyrus	The Hardest Part	"Unfinished"	Dan Wilson, Jonathan Rotem, Noah Cyrus
2022	MØ	Motordrome (The Dødstrom Edition)	"Spaceman"	Jas Mann, Karen Ørsted, Noonie Bao, Oscar Holter
2022	Clinton Kane	MAYBE SOMEDAY IT'LL ALL BE OK	"KEEP IT TO YOURSELF"	Clinton Kane, Steve Rusch, William Wiik Larsen
2022	James Bay	Leap	"Right Now"	James Bay
2022	Martin Garrix, Justin Mylo, Dewain Whitmore	Sentio	"Find You"	Dewain Whitmore Jr., Emilio Behr, Martijn Garritsen
2022	Joshua Bassett	Doppelgänger	"Doppelgänger"	Joshua Bassett, Davis Naish
2021	Kito, BROODS	Blossom	"Locked On You (feat. BROODS)"	Georgia Nott, Maaike Kito Lebbing, Noah Beresin
2021	Brasstracks, Tori Kelly	Welcome Back Era	"Still Life"	Tyler Johnson, Ivan Rosenberg, Victoria Loren Kelly
2021	Kane Brown, H.E.R.	Non-album single	"Blessed & Free"	Kane Brown, Gabriella Wilson, David Biral, Denzel Michael-Akil Baptiste, Russ Chell
2021	Lil Nas X	MONTERO	"ONE OF ME (feat. Elton John)"	Jasper Sheff, John Cunningham, Montero Hill
2021	Yebba	Dawn	"Boomerang"	Abbey Smith, Tommy Brenneck
2021	Yebba	Dawn	"All I Ever Wanted"	Mark Ronson, Abbey Smith, James Francies
2021	Yebba	Dawn	"Love Came Down"	Mark Ronson, Abbey Smith
2021	Kacey Musgraves	Star-Crossed	"Justified"	Kacey Musgraves, Ian Fitchuk, Brandon Joyner Burton
2021	Kacey Musgraves	Star-Crossed	"Breadwinner"	Kacey Musgraves, Ian Fitchuk, Brandon Joyner Burton
2021	Big Red Machine	How Long Do You Think It's Gonna Last?	"Mimi (feat. Ilsey)"	Aaron Dessner, Justin Vernon
2021	Weezer	OK Human	"All My Favorite Songs"	Rivers Cuomo, Ben Johnson, Ashley Gorley
2020	Jimmie Allen, Noah Cyrus	Non-album single	"This Is Us"	Jordan Schmidt, Tyler Hubbard, D'Mile, Noah Cyrus
2020	Sam Smith	Love Goes	"Laurel Canyon"	Sam Smith, Tor Hermansen, Mikkel Eriksen
2020	Miley Cyrus	Plastic Hearts	"Midnight Sky"	Andrew Wotman, Ali Tamposi, Jonathan Bellion, Louis Bell, Miley Cyrus
2020	Miley Cyrus	Plastic Hearts	"Never Be Me"	Mark Ronson, Miley Cyrus
2020	Miley Cyrus	Plastic Hearts	"Edge of Midnight" (Midnight Sky Remix) (featuring Stevie Nicks)	Andrew Wotman, Ali Tamposi, Jonathan Bellion, Louis Bell, Miley Cyrus, Stevie Nicks
2020	Miley Cyrus	Plastic Hearts	Bad Karma (featuring Joan Jett & The Blackhearts)	Miley Cyrus
2020	Fletcher	The S(ex) Tapes	Sex (With My Ex)	James Ho, Cari Fletcher
2019	Lost Kings	Paper Crowns	"Don't Kill My High" (featuring Wiz Khalifa and Social House)	Robert Abisi, Nicholas Shanholtz, Ruth-Anne Cunningham, John Ryan II, Ian Franzino, Andrew Haas, Sabrina Bernstein, James Newman, Marcus Lomax, Alexander Izquerdio, Cameron Thomaz Michael Foster, Charles Anderson
2019	P!nk	Hurts 2B Human	"My Attic"	Julia Michaels, Fredrick Wexler
2019	Miley Cyrus	SHE IS COMING	"Unholy"	Miley Cyrus, Andrew Wyatt, Jasper Sheff, John Cunningham
2019	Miley Cyrus	SHE IS COMING	"D.R.E.A.M." (featuring Ghostface Killah)	Miley Cyrus, John Cunningham, Clifford Smith, Corey Woods, David Porter, Dennis Coles, Gary Grice, Isaac Hayes, Jason Hunter, Lamont Hawkins, Robert Diggs, Russell Jones
2019	Miley Cyrus	SHE IS COMING	"Cattitude" (featuring RuPaul)	Miley Cyrus, Alma-Sofia Miettinen, Andrew Wyatt, Rupaul Andre Charles
2019	Miley Cyrus	SHE IS COMING	"The Most"	Miley Cyrus, Mark Ronson, Jonny Price, Marcus Lomax, Stefan Johnson, Brandon Burton
2019	Zara Larsson	Poster Girl (Japanese Deluxe Edition)	"All the Time"	Zara Larsson, Jonnali Parmenius, Linus Wiklund
2019	Mark Ronson	Late Night Feelings	"Late Night Prelude"	Mark Ronson, Lykke Li, Stephen Kozmeniuk
2019	Mark Ronson	Late Night Feelings	"Late Night Feelings" (featuring Lykke Li)	Mark Ronson, Lykke Li, Stephen Kozmeniuk
2019	Mark Ronson	Late Night Feelings	"Find U Again" (featuring Camila Cabello)	Mark Ronson, Kevin Parker, Karla Estrabao
2019	Mark Ronson	Late Night Feelings	"Pieces of Us" (featuring King Princess)	Mark Ronson, Mikaela Straus, Michael Malchicoff
2019	Mark Ronson	Late Night Feelings	"Truth" (featuring Alicia Keys and The Last Artful, Dodgr)	Mark Ronson, Thomas Brenneck, Nicholas Movshon, Diana Gordon, Alana Chenevert
2019	Mark Ronson	Late Night Feelings	"2AM" (featuring Lykke Li)	Mark Ronson, Thomas Brenneck, Lykke Li
2019	Mark Ronson	Late Night Feelings	"Spinning" (featuring Ilsey)	Mark Ronson, Lykke Li, Stephen Kozmeniuk
2019	Lykke Li	Still Sad Still Sexy EP	"Two Nights Part II" (with Skrillex and Ty Dolla Sign)	Lykke Li, Jeff Bhasker, Sonny Moore, Jonathan Coffer, James Ho, Tyrone Griffin Jr., Adam Daniel
2019	Adam Lambert	Velvet: Side A	"Superpower"	Adam Lambert, Thomas Schleiter
2019	Gryffin	Gravity	"Baggage" (with Gorgon City and AlunaGeorge)	Daniel Griffith, Jonnali Parmenius, Aluna Francis, Jakob Hazell, Svante Halldin
2019	Neiked	Non-album single	"Sometimes" (featuring Kes Kross and Jackson Penn)	Victor Radstrom, Kevin Kessee, Fredrick Wexler, Albin Nedler
2019	James Arthur	You	"Sad Eyes"	James Arthur, Daniel Parker, Henry Allen
2019	Harry Styles	Fine Line	"Treat People with Kindness"	Harry Styles, Jeff Bhasker
2018	Camila Cabello	Camila	"She Loves Control"	Karla Estrabao, Mustafa Ahmed, Sonny Moore, Adam Feeney, Louis Bell
2018	Bleachers	Love, Simon OST	"Alfie's Song (Not So Typical; Love Song)"	Harry Styles, Jack Antonoff
2018	Anne-Marie	Speak Your Mind	"Machine"	Anne-Marie Nicholson, Teddy Geiger
2018	Diplo	Non-album single	"Stay Open" (featuring MØ)	Thomas Pentz, Philip Meckseper, Henry Allen, Karen Marie Ørsted
2018	Panic! at the Disco	Pray for the Wicked	"High Hopes"	Brendon Urie, Taylor Parks, Lauren Pritchard, Samuel Hollander, Jenny Owen Youngs, Jonas Jeberg, William Lobban-Bean
2018	Lykke Li	so sad so sexy	"deep end"	Lykke Li, Jeff Bhasker, James Ho, Tyler Williams, Stephen Kozmeniuk
2018	Lykke Li	so sad so sexy	"two nights" (featuring Aminé)	Lykke Li, Jeff Bhasker, James Ho, Jonathan Coffer, Adam Daniel
2018	Lykke Li	so sad so sexy	"last piece"	Lykke Li, Alexander Payami
2018	Lykke Li	so sad so sexy	"jaguars in the air"	Lykke Li, Jeff Bhasker, James Ho, Tyler Williams
2018	Lykke Li	so sad so sexy	"sex money feelings die"	Lykke Li, James Ho, Dacoury Natche, Sarah Aarons, Thomas Hull
2018	Lykke Li	so sad so sexy	"so sad so sexy"	Lykke Li, Andrew Wyatt, Emile Haynie, Jeff Bhasker, James Ho
2018	Lykke Li	so sad so sexy	"better alone"	Lykke Li, Carlos Montagnese
2018	Lykke Li	so sad so sexy	"bad woman"	Lykke Li, Rick Nowels, James Ho
2018	Lykke Li	so sad so sexy	"utopia"	Lykke Li, James Ho, Jonathan Coffer
2018	Christina Aguilera	Liberation	"Accelerate" (featuring Ty Dolla Sign and 2 Chainz)	Christina Aguilera, Kanye West, Michael Dean, Christopher Guevara, Ernest Brown, Carlton Mays, Jr. Badrilla Bourelly, Taylor Parks, Kirby Lauryen, Tyrone Griffin, Jr., Tauheed Epps, Ronald Brown
2018	Christina Aguilera	Liberation	"Maria"	Christina Aguilera, Kanye West, Ross Birchard, Jahron Brathwaite, Taylor Parks, Christopher Guevara, Noah Goldstein, Lawrence Brown, Linda Glover, Horgay Gordy, Allen Story
2018	Christina Aguilera	Liberation	"Masochist"	Christina Aguilera, Timothy Anderson, Darhyl Camper Jr.
2018	MAX	Non-album singles	"Still New York" (featuring Joey Bada$$)	Max Schneider, Samuel Hollander, Grant Michaels, Mark Landon, Warren Felder, Jo-Vaughn Scott
2018	Fairlane	Non-album singles	"Uncover You" (featuring Ilsey)	Nina Woodford-Wells, Catherine Dennis, Andrew Goldstein
2018	MØ	Forever Neverland	"Sun in Our Eyes" (with Diplo)	Karen Marie Ørsted, Thomas Pentz, Jonathan Hill, Henry Allen
2018	The New Respects	Before The Sun Goes Down	"Before The Sun Goes Down"	Theron Feemster, Alexandra Fitzgerald, Alexis Fitzgerald, Darius Fitzgerald, Jasmine Mullen
2018	Lil Xan	Be Safe	"Live or Die" (with Noah Cyrus)	Nicholas Diego Leanos, Noah Cyrus, Timothy McKenzie, Stanley Benton, Aris Ray
2018	David Guetta	7	"Drive" (with Black Coffee featuring Delilah Montagu)	Pierre Guetta, Nkosinathi Maphumulo, Ralph Wegner, Mikkel Eriksen, Tor Hermansen, Philip Fender
2018	Wankelmut	Non-album single	"Thicker Than Water" (with EZEE)	Jacob Dilßner, Ole Lehmann, Henry Durham, Rafael Greifer
2018	Martin Garrix	Bylaw EP	"Breach (Walk Alone)" (with Blinders)	Martijn Garritsen, Mateusz Owsiak, Dewain Whitmore Jr.
2018	Martin Garrix	Non-album singles	"Ocean" (featuring Khalid)	Martijn Garritsen, Giorgio Tuinfort, Dewain Whitmore Jr., Khalid Robinson
2018	Martin Garrix	Non-album singles	"Burn Out" (with Justin Mylo featuring Dewain Whitmore)	Martijn Garritsen, Emilio Behr, Dewain Whitmore Jr.
2018	Martin Garrix	Non-album singles	"Dreamer" (featuring Mike Yung)	Martijn Garritsen, Brian Lee, Michael Young, Alexander Parkhomenko, Yury Parkhomenko
2018	New Hope Club	Welcome to the Club, Pt. 2 EP	"Crazy"	Reece Bibby, Blake Richardson, George Smith, Dewain Whitmore Jr., Ian Kirkpatrick
2018	Rita Ora	Phoenix	"Let You Love Me"	Rita Ora, Jonnali Parmenius, Linus Wiklund, Fredrik Gibson, Finn Keane
2018	Rita Ora	Phoenix	"New Look"	Jonnali Parmenius, Jordan Suecof, Jakob Hazell, Svante Halldin
2018	Noah Cyrus	Good Cry EP	"Topanga (Voice Memo)"	Noah Cyrus
2018	Sigala	Brighter Days	"Brighter Days" (featuring Paul Janeway)	Bruce Felder, Paul Janeway
2018	Michael Bublé	Love	"Love You Anymore"	Charles Puth Jr., Scott Friedman, Johan Carlsson
2018	Rudimental	Toast to Our Differences	"Walk Alone" (featuring Tom Walker)	Amir Izadkhah, Piers Aggett, Kesi Dryden, Leon "DJ Locksmith" Rolle, Cass Lowe, Dacoury Natche, Thomas Walker, Jesse Shatkin, Jonathan Mensah
2018	Mark Ronson	Late Night Feelings	"Nothing Breaks Like a Heart" (featuring Miley Cyrus)	Mark Ronson, Thomas Brenneck, Miley Cyrus, Conor Szymanski, Clement Picard, Maxime Picard
2018	Clean Bandit	What Is Love?	"Nowhere" (featuring Rita Ora and Kyle)	Jack Patterson, Grace Chatto, Jonnali Parmenius, Linus Wiklund, Kyle Harvey
2017	Tinashe	Joyride	"Flame"	Tinashe Kachingwe, Simon Wilcox, Nolan Lambroza, Nasri Atweh
2017	Linkin Park	One More Light	"Talking to Myself"	Bradford Phillip Delson, Michael Kenji Shinoda, Jonathan Reuven Routem
2017	Linkin Park	One More Light	"Sharp Edges"	Bradford Phillip Delson, Michael Kenji Shinoda
2017	Dua Lipa	Dua Lipa	"No Goodbyes"	Dua Lipa, Lindy Robbins, Daniel Traynor
2017	Hey Violet	From the Outside	"Where Have You Been (All My Night)"	Maureen McDonald, Julian Bunetta
2017	Drake	More Life	"Glow"	Majid Al Maskati, Philip Bailey, CyHi the Prynce, Gabriel Garzón-Montano, Noah Goldstein, Aubrey Graham, Anthony Jeffries, Louis King Johnson Jr., King Louie, Illangelo, Kenza Samir, Sakiya Sandifer, Noah Shebib, Jordan Ullman, Kanye West, Maurice White, Malik Yusef
2017	Noah Cyrus	Non-album singles	"Almost Famous"	Noah Cyrus, Daniel Dodd Wilson
2017	DJ Snake	Non-album singles	"A Different Way" (featuring Lauv)	William Grigahcine, Edward Sheeran, Johnny McDaid, Steve McCutcheon, Lindy Robbins
2017	Demi Lovato	Tell Me You Love Me	"Only Forever"	Demi Lovato, Toby Gad, Warren Felder, Sean Douglas
2017	Kelly Clarkson	Meaning of Life	"Meaning of Life"	James Morrison, Jesse Shatkin
2017	Majid Jordan	The Space Between	"Not Ashamed"	Majid Al-Maskati, Jordan Ullman
2017	Majid Jordan	The Space Between	"What You Do to Me"	Majid Al-Maskati, Jordan Ullman
2017	Paloma Faith	The Architect	"WW3"	Paloma Faith, Jesse Shatkin
2017	Pia Mia	The Gift 2 EP	"Off My Feet"	Pia Perez, Yasmin Yedesma, Nicholas Balding, David Park, Dillon Deskin
2016	K. Michelle	More Issues Than Vogue	"If It Ain't Love"	Floyd Nathaniel Hills, Rosina Russell, Patrick Hayes
2016	Beyoncé	Lemonade	"All Night"	Beyonce Knowles-Carter, Alki King, Timothy Thomas, Theron Thomas, Thomas Pentz, Henry Allen, Jaramaye Daniels, André Benjamin, Antwan Patton, Patrick Brown
2016	Cash Cash	Blood, Sweat & 3 Years	"How to Love" (featuring Sofia Reyes)	Samuel Frisch, Alexander Makhlouf, Jean Paul Makhlouf, Jennifer Decilveo
2016	Bea Miller	Non-album singles	"Yes Girl"	Beatrice Miller, Andrew Wansel, Warren Felder, Trevor Brown, William Simmons
2016	Alisan Porter	Non-album singles	"Down That Road"	Alisan Porter, Ely Rise
2016	Nick Jonas	Last Year Was Complicated	"Unhinged"	Nick Jonas, Nolan Lambroza
2016	LEEHI, DOK2	SEOULITE	"FXXK WIT US"	Dok2, Lee Hi, Code Kunst, Tablo
2016	Martin Garrix	Non-album single	"In the Name of Love" (with Bebe Rexha)	Martijn Garritsen, Bleta Rexha, Matthew Radosevich, Ruth-Anne Cunningham, Stephen Philibin, Yael Nahar
2016	Jake Miller	Overnight EP	"Overnight"	Travis Mills, James Abrahart, Leroy Clampitt, Andreas Schuller, James Wong
2016	Jake Miller	Overnight EP	"Superhuman"	Amanda Lucille Warner, Leroy Clampitt, Andreas Schuller
2016	Britney Spears	Glory	"Man on the Moon"	Brandon Lowry, Phoebe Ryan, Jason Evigan, Marcus Lomax
2016	Hey Violet	Non-album single	"Guys My Age"	Rena Lovelis, Nia Lovelis, Miranda Miller, Casey Moreta, John Ryan II, Julian Bunetta, Henry Walter, Jacob Kasher Hindlin
2016	Shawn Mendes	Illuminate	"Mercy"	Shawn Mendes, Teddy Geiger, Daniel Parker
2016	Deorro	Non-album single	"Goin' Up" (with DyCy)	Erick Orrosquieta, Fransisca Hall
2016	Paul Janeway	Non-album single	"Healing"	Paul Janeway, Thomas Rowlands
2016	Train	A Girl, a Bottle, a Boat	"Working Girl"	Patrick Monahan, William Wiik Larsen
2015	Fifth Harmony	Reflection	"Body Rock"	Timothy Thomas, Theron Thomas, Harmony Samuels, John DeNicola, Donald Markowitz, Franke Previte
2015	Snoh Aalegra	Non-album single	"Emotional"	Robert Diggs, Clarence Coffee Jr., Ronnie Williams, David Porter
2015	Drake	If You're Reading This It's Too Late	"Jungle"	Aubrey Graham, Majid Al Maskati, Jordan Ullman, Carlos Montagnese, Paul Jeffries, Noah "40" Shebib, Gabriel Garzón-Montano
2015	Robin Schulz	Sugar	"Headlights" (featuring Ilsey)	Robin Schulz, Dennis Bierbrodt, Guido Kramer, Jürgen Dohr, John Ryan II, Eric Frederic, Andreas Schuller, Joseph Spargur, Thomas Peyton
2015	Mariah Carey	#1 to Infinity	"Infinity"	Mariah Carey, Taylor Parks, Priscilla Hamilton, Eric Hudson
2015	Major Lazer	Peace Is the Mission	"Powerful" (featuring Ellie Goulding and Tarrus Riley)	Thomas Wesley Pentz, Maxime Picard, Clement Picard, Omar Riley, Fransisca Hall
2015	Majid Jordan	Majid Jordan	"My Love" (featuring Drake)	Majid Al Maskati, Jordan Ullman, Aubrey Graham, Carlos Montagnese, Paul Jeffries, Noah "40" Shebib
2015	Kaskade	Automatic	"Disarm You" (featuring Ilsey)	Ryan Raddon, Finn Bjarnson, Nathaniel Motte, Jeremy Coleman
2015	T Mills	Non-album single	"Young & Stupid" (featuring T.I.)	Travis Mills, John Ryan II, Eric Frederic, Andreas Schuller, Joseph Spargur, Thomas Peyton, Clifford Harris Jr.
2015	Grace Mitchell	Raceday EP	"NoLo"	Grace Mitchell, Mark Foster, Sean Cimino, Isom Innis, Morgan Reid, Annaliese Schiersch
2014	Jennifer Lopez	A.K.A.	"Never Satisfied"	Jennifer Lopez, Alejandro Salazar
2014	Pitbull	Globalization	"Fireball" (featuring John Ryan)	Armando Perez, John Ryan II, Eric Frederic, Andreas Schuller, Joseph Spargur, Thomas Peyton
2012	Taryn Manning	Freedom City	"Send Me Your Love" (featuring Sultan & Ned Shepard)	Taryn Manning, Michael Linney, Ivan Corraliza, John Saviano, James Saviano
2008	Terrence Howard	Shine Through It	"Sanctuary"	Terrence Howard
