= Find U Again =

2019 single by Mark Ronson featuring Camila Cabello

Single by Mark Ronson featuring Camila Cabello

from the album Late Night Feelings
- Released: 30 May 2019
- Recorded: 2017 – January 2019
- Studio: Zelig, Los Angeles, California, U.S.; Diamond Mine, Queens, New York, U.S.
- Genre: Synth-pop; disco-pop
- Length: 2:56
- Label: Sony; RCA
- Songwriter(s): Mark Ronson; Camila Cabello; Kevin Parker; Ilsey Juber
- Producer(s): Mark Ronson; Kevin Parker

Mark Ronson singles chronology
"Don't Leave Me Lonely" (2019)	"Find U Again" (2019)	"Pieces of Us" (2019)

Camila Cabello singles chronology
"Mi Persona Favorita" (2019)	"Find U Again" (2019)	"Señorita" (2019)

Music video
- "Find U Again" on YouTube

"Find U Again" is a song by English record producer Mark Ronson featuring American singer Camila Cabello. It was released on 30 May 2019, as the fourth single from Ronson's fifth studio album Late Night Feelings (2019). The song contains elements of synth-pop and disco-pop, and is accompanied by synthesizers and vocodered vocals. It was compared to bedroom pop songs by Lesley Gore and the Shangri-Las from the 1960s. The lyrics describe the process of searching for a new relationship after a previous heartbreak. The song was written by Cabello, Ilsey Juber, and the producers Ronson and Kevin Parker.

"Find U Again" received generally positive reviews from music critics, who praised Ronson's production and Cabello's vocal delivery. The song peaked at number one on the US Dance Club Songs chart after several remixes were made, and charted at number 27 on the UK Singles Chart where it received a silver certification. An accompanying music video was directed by Bradley & Pablo and depicts Ronson rescuing Cabello from bounty hunters. The video was compared to the film noir and western movie genres, in addition to Quentin Tarantino-directed films such as Kill Bill (2003).

== Background and release ==
In 2017, Mark Ronson and Tame Impala musician Kevin Parker collaborated on the melody of "Find U Again" while they were on tour. Ronson offered to finish the song for his next album when Parker needed to return to Perth, stating that he needed "the perfect person whose voice is just gonna cut through, and it's gonna be the right person to write the lyrics". He decided to include Camila Cabello after hearing her 2017 song "Never Be the Same" on the radio, stating that it "cuts so hard, but she delivers a lot of emotion". She immediately accepted when he texted her about the concept of his fifth studio album Late Night Feelings (2019), particularly about the theme of heartbreak. During the recording session, Cabello contributed her own lyrics to the song's chorus, some of which she had had since the age of 16. According to other sources, however, she thought of the lyrics the night before entering the recording studio. Ronson was surprised by how fast Cabello formulated the lyrics, admitting that writing lyrics to a pre-existing melody can be challenging. Describing Cabello's vocals, he compared them to a laser which "cuts through," acknowledging that not many artists have that capability.

In January 2019, Ronson, Cabello, and songwriter Ilsey Juber shared a picture from a recording studio and hinted at a possible collaboration. While Ronson was on the red carpet at the 61st Annual Grammy Awards, he confirmed that Cabello would appear on a track titled "Find U Again". Prior to its release, Cabello posted a video of herself singing the song in a car, while Ronson posted a teaser on Instagram. "Find U Again" premiered on Zane Lowe's Beats 1 station on 30 May 2019. It was distributed to streaming services and made available for digital download on the same day.

== Composition ==
"Find U Again" is a synth-pop and disco-pop song, accompanied by a 1980s synthesizer and Auto-Tuned vocals. According to the sheet music published at Musicnotes.com by BMG Rights Management, the song is based on 4/4 common time, with a tempo of 104 beats per minute, and is played in the key of C minor. Cabello's vocal range spans from the low note of B♭_{3} to the high note of C_{5}. She croons throughout the song over twinkling keys and synth-bass, which was described as an experimental sonic track compared to 1960s bedroom songs by Lesley Gore and the Shangri-Las. The instrumentation challenged Cabello's vocals, as they deviated from her previous pop songs, which consisted of a trap drum kit and top 40 sounds. Writing for Billboard, Andrew Unterberger stated that Cabello's versatile vocals were similar to that of Charli XCX and Kim Petras, noting that both artists had songs which were included on Spotify's New Music Friday playlist the same week.

The song's middle eight contains a mellifluous vocoder, as Cabello transitions from singing in a ballad-style manner in the chorus, to each verse in a "sing-speak-y falsetto" with a bubblegum pop cadence. She despairingly sings the lyric in the second verse with an increased pitch, "Have mercy on me please / I messed up to the third degree". Brittany Spanos of Rolling Stone compared her vocodered vocals on the ramped up second verse to Taylor Swift's 2018 song "Delicate". Couplets are used in the lyric, "this crush is kind-of crushing me / I do therapy at least twice a week", which is described as a "breathy falsetto plea for patience". Cabello modulates her voice when she sings the lyric, "tears in your eyes".

The lyrics describe the process of finding a new relationship while recovering from heartbreak, as Cabello sings about losing a person that she would never see again. She attempts to forget the memories by seeking new lovers and reacquainting with past haunts. Lyrically, "Find U Again" portrays the intense emotions of breakup sadness similar to the Backstreet Boys' 1999 song "I Want It That Way", which accentuates "soul-destroying sadness". Amanda Mitchell of O, The Oprah Magazine suggested that the song was written about Ronson's divorce from French actress Joséphine de La Baume.

== Critical reception ==
Kat Bein of Billboard described "Find U Again" as a "a sugary-sweet, vocoded crush song". Variety staff member Jem Aswad stated that it was "the most pop-friendly track" on Late Night Feelings, commending the "sultry melody" and "comfortable groove". Writing for Bandwagon, Indran Paramasivam stated that "Find U Again" is a "mood-perfect herald" for Late Night Feelings, describing it as "high-gloss, bass-forward pop with a tear-stained heft". Mitchell described "Find U Again" as "dance floor magic". Spanos praised Ronson's light and fresh production, which "never overshadows Cabello's effectively minimalistic delivery" and acknowledged that she has the "innate ability to add that extra, inexplicably something to anything she touches".

Writing for Uproxx, Chloe Gilke stated that Cabello's vocals perfectly matched the song's "moody melancholy" theme, which she similarly compared to her debut 2018 studio album Camila in "finding the beauty in distress and ugly feelings". Paper staff member Brendan Wetmore acknowledged that "Find U Again" "far exceeded expectations", commending the drastic shift in tone from Cabello's previous ventures such as Fifth Harmony and Camila. Shaad D'Souza of The Fader noted that the song displayed an emotional intensity of breakup sadness despite containing lyrical clichés and generic phrases, praising Cabello's lyrical depth in the track that was disguised as "wide-reaching simplicity".

== Commercial performance ==
"Find U Again" topped the US Dance Club Songs chart on the Billboard chart dated 9 October 2019, after it was remixed by MK, Robert Eibach and The Scene Kings. It was Cabello's first number one song on the chart, while it was Ronson's fourth after "Nothing Breaks Like a Heart" (2018), "Electricity" (2018), and "Uptown Funk" (2014). The song ranked at number 32 on the Dance Club Songs 2019 year-end chart in the United States. "Find U Again" peaked at number 67 on the Canadian Hot 100 chart dated 15 June 2019, where it remained for nine weeks. The song was certified gold by Music Canada (MC) on 3 September 2019, for selling 40,000 units in Canada.

On the UK Singles Chart, "Find U Again" debuted at number 41 on the chart dated 13 June 2019. It peaked at number 27 on the chart dated 26 July 2019, and charted for 13 weeks. The song was certified silver by the British Phonographic Industry (BPI) on 27 September 2019, for track-equivalent sales of 200,000 units in the United Kingdom. In Australia, "Find U Again" peaked at number 53 on the ARIA Singles Chart on the chart dated 8 June 2019, and was certified platinum by the Australian Recording Industry Association (ARIA) for sales of 70,000 track-equivalent units in Australia. The song was certified gold by the Polish Society of the Phonographic Industry (ZPAV) on 10 February 2021, for selling 10,000 units in Poland.

== Music video ==
=== Background and development ===
On 8 July 2019, Ronson announced the release date of the music video on his social media accounts with a promotional poster, while RCA Records released a trailer. Cabello also shared an image on Instagram, which showed her with blonde hair and a fringe, pink lips, and kohl surrounding her eyes. She is seen wearing a silver dress with embellished sleeves, while holding a coffee cup. The music video was officially released on 9 July 2019. It was directed by Bradley & Pablo, and filmed in Los Angeles. Scenes filmed outside were shot in grayscale while scenes filmed inside contained "pops of colour", with an emphasis on blue.

=== Synopsis ===
The music video was compared to film genres such as western and film noir, in addition to Tarantino-directed films such as Kill Bill: Volume 1 (2003).

In a motel, a bounty hunter called the Duke receives a call to pursue Cabello after learning that there is a bounty placed on her. Other bounty hunters were notified, including a duo named as the Twins. Ronson is also offered a $5,000 bounty to capture her "dead or alive". Cabello is disguised as a cabaret performer at Club Heartbreak, wearing a blonde wig and rhinestone-encrusted sequined bodysuit, while performing the song alongside two backup dancers. Ronson is the first person to arrive, but decides to watch her performance instead. A line of text is displayed with the sentence, "he has no idea he is about to fall in love".

The Duke is seen driving a muscle car and wearing a cowboy hat, while the Twins share a motorcycle. A truck driver by the name Nova Mercedes follows after them, who is stated to be a "curious opportunist" by the accompanying text. Club Heartbreak is raided and ripped apart by various bounty hunters led by the Duke, as they search for Cabello. The lights continuously flicker as Cabello is missing from the stage; she is seen crouching beside Ronson in the dark. Both artists drive off in Ronson's car when Cabello rips off her wig, revealing her natural brunette hair. She begins to smile as they make a getaway into the night.

=== Reception ===
Writing for Billboard, Kirsten Spruch stated that the music video's retro and vintage atmosphere matched Ronson's production, which reminded her of old western films. Shakiel Mahjouri of Entertainment Tonight Canada noted that it contained "an Old Western vibe". Karen Gwee of NME opined that the music video contained film noir elements. Spanos compared it to 2003 martial arts film Kill Bill. ABC News Radio staff also considered the video to be similar in style to Quentin Tarantino-directed films. Israel Daramola of Spin thought that it was complete with a car chase and the evocative presence of people, while Gilke considered the music video to be "strikingly cinematic".

== Other cover versions ==
Mabel performed a cover of "Find U Again" on BBC Radio 1's Live Lounge segment, which was uploaded to its official Vevo account on 7 August 2019.

== Track listing ==
Digital download – Marc Kinchen remix
No.	Title	Length
1.	"Find U Again" (MK Remix)	3:49

== Credits and personnel ==
Credits adapted from the liner notes of Late Night Feelings.

Recording

- Recorded at Zelig Studios, Los Angeles, California and Diamond Mine, Queens, New York
- Mixed at MixStar Studio, Virginia Beach, Virginia
- Mastered at Sterling Sound, New York City, New York

Personnel

- Mark Ronson – production, songwriting, programming, synthesizer
- Camila Cabello – vocals, background vocals, songwriting
- Kevin Parker – production, songwriting, background vocal, guitar, synth bass, programming, recording engineering, synthesizer
- Ilsey Juber – songwriting
- Nick Movshon – bass
- Homer Steinweiss – drums
- Leon Michels – synthesizer
- Phil Joly – engineering
- Randy Merrill – mastering engineering
- Serban Ghenea – mixing engineering
- Riccardo Damian – programming, recording engineering
- Beatriz Artola – recording engineering
- Jens Jungkurth – recording engineering
- Todd Monfalcone – recording engineering
- Abby Echiverri – assistant engineering
- John Hanes – assistant engineering

== Charts ==
=== Weekly charts ===
Weekly chart performance for "Find U Again"
Chart (2019)	Peak position
Australia (ARIA)	53
Belgium (Ultratip Bubbling Under Flanders)	29
Belgium (Ultratip Bubbling Under Wallonia)	32
Canada (Canadian Hot 100)	67
Canada Hot AC (Billboard)	36
China Airplay/FL (Billboard )	6
Croatia (HRT)	35
Czech Republic (Singles Digitál Top 100)	75
Greece (IFPI)	27
Hungary (Stream Top 40)	25
Ireland (IRMA)	24
Latvia (LAIPA)	28
Lithuania (AGATA)	19
Mexico (Billboard Mexican Airplay)	46
New Zealand Hot Singles (RMNZ)	4
Scotland (OCC)	45
Singapore (RIAS)	15
Slovakia (Singles Digitál Top 100)	42
Sweden Heatseeker (Sverigetopplistan)	6
Switzerland (Schweizer Hitparade)	83
UK Singles (OCC)	27
US Bubbling Under Hot 100 (Billboard)	2
US Adult Pop Airplay (Billboard)	32
US Dance Club Songs (Billboard)	1
US Pop Airplay (Billboard)	25

=== Year-end charts ===
Year-end chart performance for "Find U Again" in 2019
Chart (2019)	Position
US Dance Club Songs (Billboard)	32

== Certifications ==
Certifications and sales for "Find U Again"
Region	Certification	Certified units/sales
Australia (ARIA)	Platinum	70,000^{‡}
Brazil (Pro-Música Brasil)	Platinum	40,000^{‡}
Canada (Music Canada)	Gold	40,000^{‡}
Mexico (AMPROFON)	Gold	30,000^{‡}
New Zealand (RMNZ)	Gold	15,000^{‡}
Poland (ZPAV)	Gold	10,000^{‡}
United Kingdom (BPI)	Silver	200,000^{‡}
^{‡} Sales+streaming figures based on certification alone.

== Release history ==
List of release dates, showing region, format(s), version(s), label(s) and reference(s)
Region	Date	Format(s)	Version(s)	Label(s)	Ref.
Various	30 May 2019	Digital download; streaming	Original	SME	
United Kingdom	31 May 2019	Contemporary hit radio	Original	Columbia	
Australia	31 May 2019	Contemporary hit radio	Original	RCA; SME	
United States	3 June 2019	Hot adult contemporary	Original	RCA	
United States	4 June 2019	Contemporary hit radio	Original	RCA	
Various	5 July 2019	Digital download; streaming	Marc Kinchen remix	SME	
Italy	26 July 2019	Contemporary hit radio	Original	SME	

== See also ==
- List of Billboard number-one dance songs of 2019
