= Brasstracks =

American R&B-hip hop production duo

- Origin: Brooklyn, New York City, U.S.
- Genres: R&B; Soul; Hip hop
- Years active: 2014–present
- Labels: Capitol, EQT
- Members: Ivan Jackson; Conor Rayne
- Website: brasstracks.co

Brasstracks are an American R&B-hip hop production duo based in Alphabet City, Manhattan, New York, composed of Ivan Jackson and Conor Rayne. They won two Grammy Awards for their work on Chance the Rapper's single "No Problem", and released their debut full-length album Golden Ticket on August 21, 2020.

== History ==
Jackson and Rayne formed Brasstracks in 2014 after meeting while attending the Manhattan School of Music, where Jackson was a trumpet player and Rayne a drummer. Jackson is originally from Manhattan and Rayne is originally from New Jersey. They primarily use live instrumentation, with Jackson on brass instruments and Rayne on drums. Their first track was the instrumental "Say U Will", and their first EP, Good Love, was released on August 19, 2016. It includes collaborations with Roses Gabor, Jay Prince, Lido, and Masego.

The duo produced the single "No Problem" by Chance the Rapper featuring 2 Chainz and Lil Wayne, off Chance the Rapper's 2016 mixtape Coloring Book. They appeared on "Am I Wrong" by Anderson .Paak featuring Schoolboy Q, and have produced and written for Wyclef Jean, GoldLink, Harry Styles, Khalid, and Mark Ronson. In 2017, they released the EP For Those Who Know Pt. I. It includes collaborations with Robert Glasper, The Underachievers, Bxrber, and S'natra. They released part 2 of the EP the following year.

In 2019, they signed with Capitol Records, and released the live EP Before We Go: Live From Capitol Studios, featuring live versions of their EP Before We Go from earlier in the year. Before We Go features guest spots from R.LUM.R, Grace, and Pell, and is a shift to a more R&B and hip hop style from their previous jazzy electronic sound. In May 2020, in advance of their debut full-length album Golden Ticket, they released the lead single "Change For Me" featuring Samm Henshaw, followed by the second single "Missed Your Call" featuring Col3trane, and then the single "Golden Ticket" featuring Masego and Common. Golden Ticket was released on Capitol Records on August 21, 2020.

They have toured with Lido, Mr. Carmack, Jack Garratt, GRiZ, and Big Gigantic. In 2019, they appeared alongside Miley Cyrus and Mark Ronson on Saturday Night Live, performing "Nothing Breaks Like a Heart".

== Members ==
- Ivan Jackson (horns, production)
- Conor Rayne (drums, production)

== Awards ==
Year	Award	Category	Work	Result
2017	Grammy Award	Best Rap Performance	"No Problem" by Chance the Rapper	Won
2017	Grammy Award	Best Rap Song	"No Problem" by Chance the Rapper	Nominated
2017	Grammy Award	Best Rap Album	Coloring Book by Chance the Rapper	Won
2021	Grammy Award	Best Pop Solo Performance	"Watermelon Sugar" by Harry Styles	Won
2021	Grammy Award	Best Pop Vocal Album	Fine Line by Harry Styles	Nominated

== Discography ==
=== Studio albums ===
List of full-length albums, with selected details
Title	Album details
For Those Who Know (Deluxe)	Released: October 3, 2018; Label: Self-released; Formats: Vinyl, digital download, streaming
Golden Ticket	Released: August 21, 2020; Label: Capitol Records; Formats: Digital download, streaming
Indigo	Released: June 2, 2023; Label: Self-released; Formats: Digital download, streaming

=== EPs ===
List of extended plays, with selected details
Title	Album details
Good Love	Released: August 19, 2016; Label: Self-released; Formats: Digital download, streaming
For Those Who Know Pt. I	Released: October 20, 2017; Label: Self-released; Formats: Digital download, streaming
For Those Who Know Pt. II	Released: August 24, 2018; Label: Self-released; Formats: Digital download, streaming
Before We Go	Released: February 21, 2019; Label: EQT Recordings; Formats: Vinyl, digital download, streaming
Before We Go: Live From Capitol Studios	Released: August 2, 2019; Label: Capitol Records; Formats: Digital download, streaming

=== Singles ===
==== As lead artist ====
Title	Year	Album
"Say U Won't"	2016	Good Love
"Favorite"	2017	Non-album single
"Those Who Know"	2017	For Those Who Know
"All of the Lights" (featuring Alexander Lewis)	2017	Non-album singles
"XO Tour Lif3"	2017	Non-album singles
"Fever"	2017	Non-album singles
"Favorite" (featuring VanJess)	2017	Non-album singles
"Those Who Know"	2017	Non-album singles
"Brownstone" (featuring BXRBER)	2017	Non-album singles
"Good Kid Brass City"	2017	Non-album singles
"Vibrant" featuring Pell)	2018	Non-album singles
"Improv #1" (Live) (featuring The Underachievers)	2018	Non-album singles
"Opposite Ways" (Live)	2018	Non-album singles
"Opposite Ways" (Live) (featuring S'natra and FATHERDUDE)	2018	Non-album singles
"Stay There" (featuring Xavier Omär)	2018	For Those Who Know, Pt. II
"In My Feelings"	2018	Non-album singles
"Too Far Too Fast"	2018	
"I'm Alright" (featuring R.LUM.R	2019	Before We Go
"Professional" (featuring Kyle Dion)	2019	
"Snowdaze" (featuring Charles Gaines)	2019	Before We Go
"Always Be My Baby"	2019	Non-album single
"Change For Me" (featuring Samm Henshaw)	2020	Golden Ticket
"Missed Your Call" (featuring Col3trane)	2020	Golden Ticket
"Hold Ya" (featuring Lawrence)	2020	Golden Ticket
"Will Call" (featuring Elliott Skinner and Victoria Canal)	2020	Golden Ticket
"Golden Ticket" (featuring Masego and Common)	2020	Golden Ticket
"My Boo	2020	Non-album singles
"Swerve" (featuring Pell)	2020	Non-album singles
"Disco Break" (Live) (featuring Julius Rodriguez)	2020	Non-album singles
"What's Next"		Non-album singles
"Welcome Back"	2021	Welcome Back Era
"Kool Aid" (featuring Cait Harris)	2021	Welcome Back Era
"After A While" (featuring COOKIE)	2021	Welcome Back Era
"Summertime 1, 2 (featuring Yung Pinch and Rothstein)	2021	Welcome Back Era
"Good Luck For Real" (featuring TOBi)	2021	Welcome Back Era
"Give It Right Back to You" (featuring TOBi)		Welcome Back Era
"Still Life" featuring Tori Kelly)		Welcome Back Era
"Monica" (featuring Rothstein)	2022	Dreamboat
"Limestone" (featuring FATHERDUDE)	2022	Dreamboat
"Dance Machine" (featuring Kemba J. Hoard)	2022	Indigo
"Last Christmas"	2021	Bells On
"Sugar, We're Going Down"	2022	
"Nobody's Fool" (featuring FATHERDUDE and TOBi)	2023	Indigo
"Anesthesia"	2023	Indigo
"Indigo"	2023	Indigo
"Cowboy"	2023	Indigo

=== As featured artist ===
Title	Year	Album
"Our Style" (WILYWNKA featuring Brasstracks)	2021	Non-album single)
"Blue in the Face" (Rothstein featuring Alexander Lewis and Brasstracks)	2021	Hemlock (Note: Hemlock is the name of a three-song single.)
"Put My Mom in Gucci" (Rothstein featuring Alexander Lewis, Radamiz, and Brasstracks)	2021	Hemlock
"Morning Glory" (Rothstein featuring Alexander Lewis, Nic Hanson, and Brasstracks)	2021	Hemlock

== Producing and writing credits ==
Year	Artist(s)	Album	Song	Credit
2015	"GoldLink"	And After That, We Didn't Talk	"Dark Skin Women"	Producer
2016	Chance the Rapper feat. 2 Chainz and Lil Wayne	Coloring Book	"No Problem"	Producer
2016	Anderson .Paak feat. Schoolboy Q	Malibu	"Am I Wrong"	Horns
2016	Khalid		"Whirlwind"	Producer
2016	Xavier Omär	The Everlasting Wave	"Special Eyes"	Producer
2018	Mark Ronson feat. Miley Cyrus	Late Night Feelings	"Nothing Breaks Like a Heart"	Writer
2019	Harry Styles	Fine Line	"Lights Up"	Horns
2019	Harry Styles	Fine Line	"Watermelon Sugar"	Horns
2019	Harry Styles	Fine Line	"Fine Line"	Horns
2019	The Brand New Heavies	TBNH	"These Walls"	Horns
2019	88-Keys feat. Mac Miller and Sia		"That's Life"	Horns
2019	Madeon	Good Faith (Madeon album)	"Hold Me Just Because"	Horns
2019	MAX and Felly	Colour Vision	"Acid Dreams"	Horns
2020	Radamiz feat. Kota the Friend	Synonyms of Strength	"Goya"	Producer
2020	BTS	BE	"Dis-ease"	Producer
2022	J-Hope	Jack in the Box	"More"	Writer & Producer
2022	J-Hope	Jack in the Box	"Future"	Writer & Producer
2022	Polyphia	Remember That You Will Die	"Genesis"	Writer

== Other appearances ==
Title	Year	Credited artist(s)	Album
"Flamingo"	2023	Cory Wong (featuring Brasstracks)	"The Lucky One"
