= 2014 BBC Music Awards =

1st BBC Music Awards
- Date: 11 December 2014
- Location: Earls Court Exhibition Centre, London
- Hosted by: Chris Evans; Fearne Cotton

Television/radio coverage
- Network: BBC One; BBC Radio 1 BBC Radio 2

The 2014 BBC Music Awards was the inaugural music award show, created out of the BBC's new strategy for music, BBC Music in 2014. The awards were held on 11 December 2014 at the Earls Court Exhibition Centre in London, which would be the final event to be broadcast from the venue. The awards show was announced on 16 June 2014.

The awards recognise the biggest and most exciting artists from the previous 12 months, as well as looking forward to new talent in 2015. A panel of judges decided the winners of each category, except 'Song of the Year', which was decided by the public.

Ed Sheeran, Pharrell Williams and Sam Smith all had two nominations apiece, with Williams winning two awards and Sheeran winning 'British Artist of the Year'.

== Performances ==
Artist(s)	Song(s)
Coldplay	"A Sky Full of Stars"
Labrinth; Ella Henderson	"Jealous" "Ghost"
Clean Bandit; Love Ssega; Jess Glynne	"Mozart's House" "Rather Be"
George Ezra	"Budapest"
Gregory Porter	"Feeling Good" "Liquid Spirit"
One Direction	"Steal My Girl"
Ed Sheeran	"Sing"
Calvin Harris; John Newman; Ellie Goulding	"Blame" "Outside"
Catfish and the Bottlemen	"Kathleen"
Paloma Faith; Sigma	"Only Love Can Hurt Like This" "Changing"
Take That	"These Days"
will.i.am Cody Wise	"It's My Birthday"
Tom Jones; Paloma Faith; BBC Concert Orchestra	"God Only Knows"

== Nominees and winners ==
British Artist of the Year (presented by Tom Jones)	International Artist of the Year (presented by Chris Evans)
Ed Sheeran; David Bowie; Elbow; Jungle; Royal Blood; Sam Smith	Pharrell Williams; Lorde; Dolly Parton; Gregory Porter; Prince; Taylor Swift
Song of the Year (presented by Idris Elba)	BBC Introducing Award (presented by Fearne Cotton)
Pharrell Williams – "Happy"; Clean Bandit featuring Jess Glynne – "Rather Be"; Coldplay – "A Sky Full of Stars"; George Ezra – "Budapest"; Ella Henderson – "Ghost"; Kiesza – "Hideaway"; Nico & Vinz – "Am I Wrong"; Lorde – "Royals"; Ed Sheeran – "Sing"; Sam Smith – "Money on My Mind"	Catfish and the Bottlemen

== Ratings ==
The show achieved a total of 4.17 million viewers, making it the fifth most watched programme of the night. The show received higher ratings than the 2014 BRIT Awards earlier in the year, which achieved 3.84 million viewers, the lowest ratings in its history.
