= Love Me like You Do =

2015 single by Ellie Goulding

"Love Me Like You Do"

Single by Ellie Goulding

from the album Fifty Shades of Grey (Original Motion Picture Soundtrack)
- Released: 7 January 2015
- Recorded: 2014
- Studio: MXM (Los Angeles and Stockholm); Wolf Cousins (Stockholm); The RedRoom (Gothenburg)
- Genre: Electropop
- Length: 4:10
- Label: Cherrytree; Interscope; Republic
- Songwriters: Max Martin; Savan Kotecha; Ilya Salmanzadeh; Ali Payami; Tove Nilsson
- Producers: Max Martin; Ali Payami

Ellie Goulding singles chronology
"Outside" (2014)	"Love Me Like You Do" (2015)	"Powerful" (2015)

Music video
- "Love Me Like You Do" on YouTube

"Love Me like You Do" is a song recorded by the English singer-songwriter Ellie Goulding for the soundtrack to the film Fifty Shades of Grey (2015). The song was written by Savan Kotecha, Ilya Salmanzadeh, Tove Lo, Max Martin and Ali Payami; the latter two also produced it. Goulding was selected to provide vocals to the track. It was released on 7 January 2015 as the second single from the soundtrack. The song was also included on Goulding's third studio album, Delirium (2015).

"Love Me like You Do" is a mid-tempo electropop power ballad, with instrumentation consisting of massive synths and crushing drums. Lyrically, similar to the film's theme, the song talks about the uncontrollable feeling of falling in love and being seduced by someone whose touch leaves her begging for more, even when it hurts. It received acclaim from music critics, who praised Goulding's soft vocals and the song for being sultry and grandiose. The song earned Goulding her first Grammy Award nomination for Best Pop Solo Performance, while the songwriters were nominated for the Grammy Award for Best Song Written for Visual Media, the Golden Globe Award for Best Original Song, and the Broadcast Film Critics Association Award for Best Song.

"Love Me like You Do" topped the UK Singles Chart, a position it maintained for four weeks and held the record for the most-streamed track in a single week in the United Kingdom at the time. Outside the United Kingdom, "Love Me like You Do" became Goulding's most successful single as well as becoming her first chart-topper in various countries, going number one in over 30 official charts worldwide, including Australia, Austria, Bulgaria, the Czech Republic, Denmark, Finland, Germany, Greece, Hungary, Italy, Luxembourg, New Zealand, Norway, Poland, Portugal, the Republic of Ireland, Slovakia, Slovenia, Spain, Sweden and Switzerland and peaking within the top ten of the charts in various countries, including Belgium, Colombia and the United States. It was the bestselling song of 2015 in Slovenia. It is certified multiplatinum in fifteen countries including eight-times Platinum in the US, Diamond in Germany and Double Diamond in Poland. Its accompanying music video, which features scenes of the film and Goulding dancing with her partner in a ballroom, received a nomination at the 2015 MTV Video Music Awards for Best Female Video, and in 2016 became the 21st video to receive one billion views on YouTube. The video later reached two billion views.

== Background ==
While seeking material for the Fifty Shades of Grey soundtrack, Republic Records contacted various artists, managers and music publishers to create a compilation that would appropriately represent the film's tone. "Love Me like You Do" was the result of Republic executive Tom Mackay contacting Max Martin's manager about writing a song for the film. Ilya started writing the chorus, while Ali Payami and Martin came next, with Martin "tweaking" the song and Savan Kotecha and Tove Lo also contributing with lyrics. According to Kotecha, "Love Me like You Do" was already being developed by both him and Martin prior to Fifty Shades of Grey, and he had considered giving the song to American singer Demi Lovato. However, after being shown a scene from the film during a meeting for the film's soundtrack, Martin thought "Love Me like You Do" could work, and began reworking the song for inclusion. After that, the film director Sam Taylor-Johnson asked Ellie Goulding to sing the song. Goulding, who previously contributed songs to the soundtracks to The Twilight Saga: Breaking Dawn – Part 2, The Hunger Games: Catching Fire and Divergent, initially thought about declining the invitation to record another song for a soundtrack to focus on her then-upcoming third studio album. However, after meeting the film crew and hearing the ballad she accepted. She commented:

"I wasn't going to get involved in that soundtrack because I've done a lot of soundtracks and we kind of thought we've done a bit too much film stuff. So we should probably just chill and write that third album, which is what I should be focusing on. And then I met the director [Sam Taylor-Johnson] and everyone involved and I was like, 'This is a pretty cool thing to be involved in.' Then I heard the song and I was like, 'Woah, this is a pretty awesome song.' I didn't know that it was going to be this big, genuinely. I thought [maybe] it would do well."

A slightly reworked version of the song was included on the soundtrack to the 2018 film Fifty Shades Freed, the third and final installment in the series.

== Composition and lyrics ==
"Love Me like You Do" was written by Max Martin, Savan Kotecha, Ilya Salmanzadeh, Ali Payami and Tove Lo, with production by Martin and Payami; they were also responsible for programming, drums, percussion, keys and bass. Strings were arranged by Mattias Bylund, violin was played by Mattias Johansson and cello by David Bukovinsky. Peter Carlsson was responsible for vocal editing, as well as background vocals, along with Martin, Payami, Ilya, Kotecha, Oscar Holter, Robin Fredriksson, Mattias Larsson, Oscar Görres and Ludvig Söderberg. It was recorded in Los Angeles and Stockholm. According to the sheet music published at MusicNotes.com by Kobalt Music Group, the song is written in the key of A♭ major, with a moderate tempo of 95 beats per minute. Goulding's vocal range spans from the low note of A♭_{3} to the high note of E♭_{5}.

"Love Me like You Do" is a tender electropop power ballad, with a "synth-filled, '80s-sounding" production. Its instrumentation consists of massive synthesisers and crushing drums, while Goulding delivers a "soft, understated vocals". In the opening seconds she sings, "You're the cure/ you're the pain/ you're the only thing I want to touch/ Never knew that it/ could mean so much/ You're the fear/ I don't care/ 'Cause I've never been so high." Lyrically, "Love Me like You Do" contrasts "innocent romantic longing" and "brooding, addictive, pain-laced sensuality", which according to Plugged In's Adam R. Holz, "mirrors the story arc of Anastasia Steele and Christian Grey" in both the book and the film. He went on to explain its lyrical content: "[It] tells the tale of a woman entranced and seduced by someone whose touch leaves her begging for more, even when—or perhaps especially when—it hurts."

== Critical reception ==
"Love Me like You Do" was acclaimed by music critics. Samantha Grossman of Time called the song "sultry" and dubbed it a "solid addition to the Fifty Shades soundtrack." Christina Garibaldi of MTV News also called it "sultry" and "soft", adding that "we can totally picture it being played during any steamy scene." Ryan Reed of Rolling Stone opined that its "results are grandiose, considering the film's sensual subject matter." Jim Farber of the New York Daily News praised her "little-girl-lost voice", noting that "Goulding sounds sweet even when she's courting danger. The music, likewise, goes for a high gloss take on romance, recalling the heavily echoed beats and dense synthesizers of a Phil Collins ballad from the '80s." Robbie Daw of Idolator described "Love Me like You Do" as "a sweeping power ballad that finds Goulding delivering soft, understated vocals over producer Max Martin's swelling bed of synths." Lucas Villa of AXS commended Goulding for "masterfully tread[ing] between delicacy and power in her performance", calling the song "intimately magnificent". Glenn Gamboa of Newsday called it "sweet, catchy, near-perfect rom-com fare".

Carolyn Menyes of Music Times complimented the song for being "sweet and dreamy, like the majority of Goulding's discography", also observing that "[t]he crawling pace works well as Goulding rolls her way through the melody, all at once being enchanting and loving. Her breathy vocals, as always, complete the atmospheric sensibility of the track." While reviewing the Fifty Shades of Grey soundtrack, Dave Holmes wrote for Esquire that the song was "[t]he closest thing to a single we've heard so far", adding that the song has "a touch of longing, a little bit of a beat" and "Goulding's voice is the sound of heavy petting." Mikael Wood, writing for Los Angeles Times, said that Goulding "put across a tender sensuality [...] even as super-producer Max Martin jacks the stadium-rave beat." Stephen Thomas Erlewine of AllMusic, in his soundtrack analysis, wrote that "it moves into the area of background romantic music, a vibe that's sometimes pierced by those overly familiar oldies that surely play a bigger role onscreen than they do on album." In a less favourable review, Jason Lipshutz of Billboard gave the song two and a half stars out of five, complimenting Goulding's voice as "one of pop's more distinct voices" and the tune's "colossal chorus", but panning its "clichéd lyrics".

=== Accolades ===
"Love Me like You Do" was first nominated for a 2015 Teen Choice Award in the category "Song from a Movie or TV Show", but eventually lost to Furious 7's "See You Again", performed by Wiz Khalifa and Charlie Puth. It was also nominated for a 2015 MTV Europe Music Award for Best Song, but lost to Taylor Swift's "Bad Blood". At the 2015 BBC Music Awards, the song was nominated for "Song of the Year", losing to Hozier's "Take Me to Church". It won the award for Best International Song at the 2015 Los Premios 40 Principales. The song was also nominated for "Favorite Song of the Year" at the 42nd People's Choice Awards, losing to Justin Bieber's "What Do You Mean?". It also received two nominations at the 58th Annual Grammy Awards: Best Pop Solo Performance (lost to Ed Sheeran's "Thinking Out Loud") and Best Song Written for Visual Media (losing to Selma's "Glory", performed by Common and John Legend), becoming the first time Goulding was nominated. The song also received a Golden Globe nomination in its 73rd edition on the Best Original Song category, but lost to Spectre's "Writing's on the Wall", performed by Sam Smith.

Full list of accolades for "Love Me like You Do"

Year	Award	Category	Result
2015	MTV Italian Music Awards	Best Tormentone	Won
2015	Teen Choice Awards	Choice Song from a Movie or TV Show	Nominated
2015	MTV Video Music Awards	Best Female Video	Nominated
2015	MTV Europe Music Awards	Best Song	Nominated
2015	BBC Music Awards	Song of the Year	Nominated
2015	Los Premios 40 Principales	Best International Song	Won
2016	People's Choice Awards	Favorite Song of the Year	Nominated
2016	Golden Globe Awards	Best Original Song	Nominated
2016	Critics' Choice Awards	Best Song	Nominated
2016	Grammy Awards	Best Pop Solo Performance	Nominated
2016	Grammy Awards	Best Song Written for Visual Media	Nominated
2016	Brit Awards	British Single of the Year	Nominated
2016	Radio Disney Music Awards	Best Crush Song	Nominated

== Commercial performance ==
"Love Me like You Do" entered at the top of the UK Singles Chart with first-week sales of 172,368 units, becoming Goulding's second number one on the chart after "Burn" (2013). The single remained at number one for a second week with chart sales of 118,225 copies and 2.25 million streams, and then a third consecutive week selling a further 118,000 copies. In its third week at number one, "Love Me like You Do" broke the streaming record in the United Kingdom at the time, with 2.58 million streams over seven days, surpassing Mark Ronson and Bruno Mars' "Uptown Funk" previous record. At the same time, the song was streamed almost 15.5 million times globally. It spent a total of four weeks at the top of the UK Singles Chart, becoming her longest number-one single on the listing.

Elsewhere in Europe, "Love Me like You Do" topped the charts in Austria, Bulgaria, the Czech Republic, Denmark, Finland, Germany, Greece, Hungary, Ireland, Italy, Luxembourg, Norway, Poland, Portugal, Slovakia, Slovenia, Spain, Sweden and Switzerland. In France, the song peaked at number five, Goulding's highest-charting single and second top-10 single on the French Singles Chart. In the Netherlands, the song became her first solo single to reach the top 10, peaking at number two on the Dutch Top 40.

In the United States, "Love Me like You Do" debuted at number 45 on the Billboard Hot 100 chart dated 24 January 2015, with first-week sales of 79,000 copies. The following week, the song climbed to number 36, and then to number 20 in its third week. On the issue dated 14 February 2015, it rose to number 14. "Love Me like You Do" reached number nine the following week, becoming Goulding's second top-10 entry on the chart. In its seventh week, the song peaked at number three on the Billboard Hot 100, becoming her highest-charting single since "Lights" peaked at number two on the chart in July 2012. On the Pop Songs chart, it was her second single to top the charts, and on the Adult Top 40 chart, it was her first number-one. "Love Me like You Do" debuted at number 38 on the Canadian Hot 100 for the week ending 24 January 2015, later peaking at number three.

In Australasia, track entered at number eight on the Australian Singles Chart and at number three on the New Zealand Singles Chart. In its fourth week, "Love Me like You Do" reached number one on both charts, becoming Goulding's first number-one single in both countries.

== Music video ==
The music video for "Love Me like You Do" was directed by Georgia Hudson and premiered on 22 January 2015. It stars Goulding and her on-screen partner, Charlie Harding, ballroom dancing in a mansion, as well as scenes from Fifty Shades of Grey. Regarding the dance in the video, she commented: "I am in it. That's me! I'm dancing in it!. [...] I basically have become fascinated with ballroom dancing so I was like, 'Can I please do some dancing in it?'. So they let me do that. There's a guy in it, Charlie, and there's some really sensual moments in it, and it's in a really beautiful house. I think it's one of my favourite videos." The video received a nomination for Best Female Video at the 2015 MTV Video Music Awards. The video passed one billion views on YouTube at the end of February 2016; the 21st song to achieve this milestone.

In France, the music video was broadcast on some channels with a warning Not advised to kids under 10 years old (in French : déconseillé aux moins de 10 ans) with some scenes from the movie blurred.

== Live performances and cover versions ==
=== Live ===
Goulding performed "Love Me like You Do" in March 2015 at a Nike app launch. On 17 October 2015, Goulding was invited by Taylor Swift on her 1989 Tour as a surprise guest to sing a duet with her. On 25 October 2015, Goulding delivered a performance at the 2015 MTV Europe Music Awards, which Billboard called "sexy" and "straightforward". On 7 November 2015, she sang it at the NRJ Music Awards. In the same month, she was also part of the American Express Unstaged, directed by Scarlett Johansson. On 20 November 2015, Goulding's performance at Idol Sweden included the song. On 24 November 2015, she and James Corden sang it in several genres during The Late Late Show with James Corden, including rock, hip hop, country, rave, reggae, folk, and gospel. Goulding performed it during Victoria's Secret Fashion Show, which aired on 8 December 2015. On 6 December 2015, she appeared at Capital FM's Jingle Bell Ball. On 10 December 2015, she gave another rendition of the song at the 2015 BBC Music Awards with the BBC Concert Orchestra. On 18 April 2020, Goulding performed the song's acoustic version at One World: Together at Home.

On 13 October 2023, Goulding performed an orchestral arrangement of the song composed by Japanese rock star Yoshiki at Royal Albert Hall.

=== Covers ===
In March 2015, Circa Waves performed a rock cover at BBC Radio 1's Live Lounge. That same month, James Arthur covered the song for MTV. In May 2015, Ella Henderson delivered an acoustic cover at Spin 1038 Live Room. In September 2015, Rhodes covered the song at BBC Radio 1's Live Lounge.

The song appears in the 2019 Max Martin jukebox musical & Juliet where it is performed by Romeo. Jordan Luke Gage, who originated the role on the West End, recorded the song for the official cast soundtrack.

== Track listings ==
Digital download
No.	Title	Length
1.	"Love Me like You Do"	4:12

CD single
No.	Title	Length
1.	"Love Me like You Do" (radio edit)	3:52
2.	"Love Me like You Do" (instrumental)	4:12

== Credits and personnel ==
Credits were adapted from the liner notes of Fifty Shades of Grey: Original Motion Picture Soundtrack.

=== Recording ===
- Recorded at MXM Studios (Los Angeles, California, and Stockholm, Sweden) and Wolf Cousins Studios (Stockholm, Sweden)
- Strings recorded at The RedRoom (Gothenburg, Sweden)
- Mixed at MixStar Studios (Virginia Beach, Virginia)
- Mastered at Bernie Grundman Mastering (Hollywood, California)

=== Personnel ===
- Ellie Goulding – lead vocals
- Max Martin – production, programming, drums, percussion, keys, bass, backing vocals
- Ali Payami – production, programming, drums, percussion, keys, bass, backing vocals
- Serban Ghenea – mixing
- John Hanes – engineering for mix
- Sam Holland – engineering
- Peter Carlsson – vocal editing, backing vocals
- Brian Gardner – mastering
- Mattias Bylund – strings, string arrangement, string recording, string editing
- Mattias Johansson – violin
- David Bukovinszky – cello
- Ilya – backing vocals
- Savan Kotecha – backing vocals
- Oscar Holter – backing vocals
- Robin Fredriksson – backing vocals
- Mattias Larsson – backing vocals
- Oscar Görres – backing vocals
- Ludvig Söderberg – backing vocals

== Charts ==
=== Weekly charts ===
2015 weekly chart performance for "Love Me like You Do"
Chart (2015)	Peak position
Australia (ARIA)	1
Austria (Ö3 Austria Top 40)	1
Belgium (Ultratop 50 Flanders)	2
Belgium (Ultratop 50 Wallonia)	3
Brazil Hot 100 Airplay (Billboard Brasil)	26
Bulgaria Airplay (BAMP)	1
Canada Hot 100 (Billboard)	3
Canada AC (Billboard)	4
Canada CHR/Top 40 (Billboard)	1
Canada Hot AC (Billboard)	1
CIS Airplay (TopHit)	5
Colombia Anglo Airplay (National-Report)	5
Czech Republic Airplay (ČNS IFPI)	1
Czech Republic Singles Digital (ČNS IFPI)	1
Denmark (Tracklisten)	1
Euro Digital Song Sales (Billboard)	1
Finland (Suomen virallinen lista)	1
France (SNEP)	5
Germany (GfK)	1
Greece Digital (Billboard)	1
Hungary (Rádiós Top 40)	16
Hungary (Single Top 40)	1
Hungary (Stream Top 40)	1
Iceland (RÚV)	7
Ireland (IRMA)	1
Israel International Airplay (Media Forest)	1
Italy (FIMI)	1
Japan Hot 100 (Billboard)	36
Luxembourg Digital Song Sales (Billboard)	1
Mexico Airplay (Monitor Latino)	15
Mexico Ingles Airplay (Billboard)	1
Netherlands (Dutch Top 40)	2
Netherlands (Single Top 100)	2
New Zealand (Recorded Music NZ)	1
Norway (VG-lista)	1
Poland Airplay (ZPAV)	1
Portugal Digital Song Sales (Billboard)	1
Romania Airplay (Media Forest)	1
Russia Airplay (TopHit)	5
Scottish Singles Sales (Official Charts)	1
Slovakia Airplay (ČNS IFPI)	1
Slovakia Singles Digital (ČNS IFPI)	1
Slovenia Airplay (SloTop50)	1
South Africa Airplay (EMA)	1
South Korea International (Gaon)	12
Spain (Promusicae)	1
Sweden (Sverigetopplistan)	1
Switzerland (Schweizer Hitparade)	1
Ukraine Airplay (TopHit)	3
UK Singles (Official Charts)	1
US Billboard Hot 100	3
US Adult Contemporary (Billboard)	4
US Adult Pop Airplay (Billboard)	1
US Dance Club Songs (Billboard)	30
US Dance Airplay (Billboard)	1
US Pop Airplay (Billboard)	1
US Rhythmic Airplay (Billboard)	27

2016 weekly chart performance for "Love Me like You Do"
Chart (2016)	Peak position
CIS Airplay (TopHit)	101
Russia Airplay (TopHit)	103
Ukraine Airplay (TopHit)	27

2017 weekly chart performance for "Love Me like You Do"
Chart (2017)	Peak position
CIS Airplay (TopHit)	167
Ukraine Airplay (TopHit)	42

2018 weekly chart performance for "Love Me like You Do"
Chart (2018)	Peak position
Ukraine Airplay (TopHit)	176

2022 weekly chart performance for "Love Me like You Do"
Chart (2022)	Peak position
CIS Airplay (TopHit)	179
Ukraine Airplay (TopHit)	118

2023 weekly chart performance for "Love Me like You Do"
Chart (2023)	Peak position
Estonia Airplay (TopHit)	150
CIS Airplay (TopHit)	146
Romania Airplay (TopHit)	114

2024 weekly chart performance for "Love Me like You Do"
Chart (2024)	Peak position
CIS Airplay (TopHit)	152
Romania Airplay (TopHit)	153

2025 weekly chart performance for "Love Me like You Do"
Chart (2025)	Peak position
Belarus Airplay (TopHit)	180
CIS Airplay (TopHit)	147
Romania Airplay (TopHit)	73

2026 weekly chart performance for "Love Me like You Do"
Chart (2026)	Peak position
Vietnam Hot 100 (Billboard)	73

=== Monthly charts ===
2015 monthly chart performance for "Love Me like You Do"
Chart (2015)	Peak position
CIS Airplay (TopHit)	6
Russia Airplay (TopHit)	6
Ukraine Airplay (TopHit)	5

2016 monthly chart performance for "Love Me like You Do"
Chart (2016)	Peak position
Ukraine Airplay (TopHit)	42

2017 monthly chart performance for "Love Me like You Do"
Chart (2017)	Peak position
Ukraine Airplay (TopHit)	76

=== Year-end charts ===
2015 year-end chart performance for "Love Me like You Do"
Chart (2015)	Position
Australia (ARIA)	7
Austria (Ö3 Austria Top 40)	7
Belgium (Ultratop 50 Flanders)	13
Belgium (Ultratop 50 Wallonia)	7
Brazil (Crowley)	30
Canada (Canadian Hot 100)	13
CIS Airplay (TopHit)	18
Denmark (Tracklisten)	3
France (SNEP)	9
Germany (Official German Charts)	4
Hungary (Rádiós Top 40)	58
Hungary (Single Top 40)	2
Ireland (IRMA)	6
Israel International Airplay (Media Forest)	2
Italy (FIMI)	10
Netherlands (Dutch Top 40)	18
Netherlands (Single Top 100)	16
New Zealand (Recorded Music NZ)	12
Poland (ZPAV)	17
Russia Airplay (TopHit)	26
Slovenia (SloTop50)	1
Spain (PROMUSICAE)	7
Sweden (Sverigetopplistan)	2
Switzerland (Schweizer Hitparade)	8
Taiwan (Hito Radio)	22
Ukraine Airplay (TopHit)	10
UK Singles (OCC)	4
US Billboard Hot 100	13
US Adult Contemporary (Billboard)	7
US Adult Top 40 (Billboard)	10
US Dance/Mix Show Airplay (Billboard)	6
US Mainstream Top 40 (Billboard)	8

2016 year-end chart performance for "Love Me like You Do"
Chart (2016)	Position
Slovenia (SloTop50)	22
Ukraine Airplay (TopHit)	114

2017 year-end chart performance for "Love Me like You Do"
Chart (2017)	Position
Slovenia (SloTop50)	47
Ukraine Airplay (TopHit)	162

2018 year-end chart performance for "Love Me like You Do"
Chart (2018)	Position
Portugal Full Track Download (AFP)	153

2022 year-end chart performance for "Love Me like You Do"
Chart (2022)	Position
Hungary (Rádiós Top 40)	35

2023 year-end chart performance for "Love Me like You Do"
Chart (2023)	Position
Hungary (Rádiós Top 40)	58

2024 year-end chart performance for "Love Me like You Do"
Chart (2024)	Position
Hungary (Rádiós Top 40)	71

=== Decade-end charts ===
Decade-end chart performance for "Love Me like You Do"
Chart (2010–2019)	Position
Norway (VG-lista)	28
Ukraine Airplay (TopHit)	115
UK Singles (OCC)	62

== Certifications and sales ==
Certifications for "Love Me like You Do"
Region	Certification	Certified units/sales
Australia (ARIA)	9× Platinum	630,000^{‡}
Austria (IFPI Austria)	Platinum	30,000^{‡}
Belgium (BRMA)	2× Platinum	60,000^{*}
Brazil (Pro-Música Brasil)	9× Diamond	2,250,000^{‡}
Canada (Music Canada)	7× Platinum	560,000^{‡}
Denmark (IFPI Danmark)	4× Platinum	360,000^{‡}
France (SNEP)	Gold	75,000^{*}
Germany (BVMI)	Diamond	1,000,000^{‡}
Italy (FIMI)	5× Platinum	250,000^{‡}
Mexico (AMPROFON)	Platinum	60,000^{*}
Netherlands (NVPI)	5× Platinum	150,000^{‡}
New Zealand (RMNZ)	6× Platinum	180,000^{‡}
Norway (IFPI Norway)	6× Platinum	240,000^{‡}
Poland (ZPAV)	2× Diamond	500,000^{‡}
South Korea (Gaon)	—	350,000
Spain (Promusicae)	2× Platinum	80,000^{‡}
Sweden (GLF)	9× Platinum	360,000^{‡}
Switzerland (IFPI Switzerland)	Platinum	30,000^{‡}
United Kingdom (BPI)	5× Platinum	3,000,000^{‡}
United States (RIAA)	8× Platinum	8,000,000^{‡}
^{*} Sales figures based on certification alone.^{‡} Sales+streaming figures based on certification alone.

== Release history ==
Release dates and formats for "Love Me like You Do"
Region	Date	Format	Label	Ref.
Canada	7 January 2015	Digital download	Universal	
United States	7 January 2015	Digital download	Cherrytree; Interscope; Republic	
United States	13 January 2015	Contemporary hit radio	Interscope	
France	19 January 2015	Digital download	Universal	
Australia	23 January 2015	Digital download	Universal	
Ireland	30 January 2015	Digital download	Polydor	
United Kingdom	1 February 2015	Digital download	Polydor	
Germany	6 February 2015	Digital download	Universal	
Japan	9 February 2015	Digital download	Universal	
Germany	12 February 2015	CD single	Universal	
