= Late Night Feelings =

Studio album by Mark Ronson
- Released: June 21, 2019
- Recorded: 2018
- Studio: Electric Lady Studios
- Genre: Indie pop
- Length: 43:06
- Labels: RCA; Sony
- Producers: Mark Ronson (also exec.); Picard Brothers; P2J; Da Honorable C.N.O.T.E.; Jr Blender; Kevin Parker; Tom Elmhirst; Brandon Bost; Jae5; Jamie xx

Mark Ronson chronology
Uptown Special (2015)	Late Night Feelings (2019)	Barbie (2023)

Singles from Late Night Feelings
- 1. "Nothing Breaks Like a Heart" Released: 29 November 2018; 2. "Late Night Feelings" Released: 12 April 2019; 3. "Don't Leave Me Lonely" Released: 17 May 2019; 4. "Find U Again" Released: 30 May 2019; 5. "Pieces of Us" Released: 17 June 2019

Late Night Feelings is the fifth studio album by British and American DJ and producer Mark Ronson. It was released on 21 June 2019. It is his first album in four years, following Uptown Special (2015). Its lead single, "Nothing Breaks Like a Heart" featuring Miley Cyrus, was released on 29 November 2018. The title track "Late Night Feelings", featuring Lykke Li, was released alongside the album pre-order on 12 April. "Don't Leave Me Lonely" was released on 17 May 2019 as the album's third single. "Find U Again" featuring Camila Cabello was released on 30 May 2019 as the fourth single. "Pieces of Us" featuring King Princess was released on 17 June 2019 as the album's fifth single.

== Background ==
In an interview with Las Vegas Weekly, Ronson described the album as "definitely the best thing" he has ever made and the album he has worked the hardest on. He also agreed that the album contains "sad bangers", as those are the kinds of songs that have "emotional resonance" and that he was drawn to making during the writing and recording process.

== Critical reception ==
Professional ratings
Aggregate scores
Source	Rating
Metacritic	75/100
Review scores
Source	Rating
AllMusic	4/5 stars
Clash	9/10
The Guardian	3/5 stars
The Irish Times	3/5 stars
Mojo	3/5 stars
Newsday	3/4 stars
NME	4/5 stars
Paste	8.1/10
Pitchfork	7.2/10
Rolling Stone	3.5/5 stars

Late Night Feelings received generally positive reviews upon release. On Metacritic, the album has an average rating of 75/100, which indicates generally positive reviews.

In a positive review, Yasmin Cowan of Clash said that the album, "might be a collection of "sad bangers" but this is a powerful - and empowering - project." Though noting some flaws, Hannah Mylrea of NME called the album "bold, brilliant and genuinely interesting pop music."

== Track listing ==
No.	Title	Writer(s)	Producer(s)	Length
1.	"Late Night Prelude"	Mark Ronson; Ilsey Juber; Lykke Li Zachrisson; Stephen Kozmeniuk	Ronson; Picard Brothers^{[a]}	1:29
2.	"Late Night Feelings" (featuring Lykke Li)	Ronson; Zachrisson; Juber; Kozmeniuk	Ronson; Picard Brothers^{[a]}; Honorable C.N.O.T.E.^{[b]}; Jr Blender^{[b]}	4:11
3.	"Find U Again" (featuring Camila Cabello)	Ronson; Cabello; Kevin Parker; Juber	Ronson; Parker	2:56
4.	"Pieces of Us" (featuring King Princess)	Ronson; Mikaela Straus; Michael Malchicoff	Ronson; Picard Brothers^{[a]}	3:26
5.	"Knock Knock Knock" (featuring Yebba)	Abbey Smith; Nick Movshon; Homer Steinweiss	Ronson	1:31
6.	"Don't Leave Me Lonely" (featuring Yebba)	Ronson; Smith; Andrew Wyatt; Victor Axelrod; Maxime Picard; Clément Picard	Ronson; Jae5^{[a]}; Picard Brothers^{[a]}; P2J^{[b]}; Tom Elmhirst^{[b]}; Brandon Bost^{[b]}	3:36
7.	"When U Went Away" (featuring Yebba)	Smith; Wyatt; Movshon; Steinweiss	Ronson	1:57
8.	"Truth" (featuring Alicia Keys and The Last Artful, Dodgr)	Ronson; Thomas Brenneck; Movshon; Alana Chenevert; Diana Gordon; Juber	Ronson; Honorable C.N.O.T.E.^{[a]}	3:48
9.	"Nothing Breaks Like a Heart" (featuring Miley Cyrus)	Ronson; Cyrus; Juber; Brenneck; M. Picard; C. Picard; Conor Rayne Szymanski	Ronson; Picard Brothers^{[a]}; Jamie xx^{[b]}	3:38
10.	"True Blue" (featuring Angel Olsen)	Ronson; Olsen	Ronson; Picard Brothers^{[b]}	5:48
11.	"Why Hide" (featuring Diana Gordon)	Ronson; Leon Michaels; Gordon; Romy Madley Croft; Steinweiss; Movshon	Ronson; Picard Brothers^{[b]}	4:19
12.	"2 AM" (featuring Lykke Li)	Juber; Brenneck; Ronson; Zachrisson	Ronson; Picard Brothers^{[a]}	3:18
13.	"Spinning" (featuring Ilsey)	Ronson; Zachrisson; Juber; Kozmeniuk	Ronson; Picard Brothers^{[a]}	3:09
Total length:				43:06

Japanese edition bonus tracks
No.	Title	Writer(s)	Producer(s)	Length
14.	"Nothing Breaks Like a Heart" (featuring Miley Cyrus) (acoustic version)	Ronson; Cyrus; Juber; Brenneck; M. Picard; C. Picard; Conor Rayne Szymanski	Ronson; Picard Brothers^{[a]}; Jamie xx^{[b]}	3:41
15.	"Nothing Breaks Like a Heart" (featuring Miley Cyrus) (Don Diablo Remix)	Ronson; Cyrus; Juber; Brenneck; M. Picard; C. Picard; Conor Rayne Szymanski	Ronson; Picard Brothers^{[a]}; Jamie xx^{[b]}	3:38
16.	"Nothing Breaks Like a Heart" (featuring Miley Cyrus) (Dimitri from Paris Remix)	Ronson; Cyrus; Juber; Brenneck; M. Picard; C. Picard; Conor Rayne Szymanski	Ronson; Picard Brothers^{[a]}; Jamie xx^{[b]}	3:32
Total length:				54:04

Notes

- ^{^[a]} signifies a co-producer
- ^{^[b]} signifies an additional producer

== Personnel ==
- Mark Ronson – bass, drums, guitars, piano, programming, synthesizers
- Picard Brothers – programming, synthesizers
- Honorable C.N.O.T.E. – programming
- Jr Blender – programming
- Kevin Parker – background vocals, guitar, programming, synthesizers
- P2J – additional production
- Tom Elmhirst– additional production, mixing
- Brandon Bost – engineering, programming, synthesizers
- JAE5 – programming, synthesizer
- Jamie xx – additional production
- Lykke Li – vocals
- Camila Cabello – vocals
- King Princess – vocals
- YEBBA – vocals
- Alicia Keys – vocals
- The Last Artful, Dodgr – vocals
- Miley Cyrus – vocals
- Angel Olsen – guitar, vocals
- Diana Gordon – vocals
- Ilsey Juber – drums, vocals
- Denise Renee – background vocals
- Amandla Stenberg – background vocals
- Tiff Stevenson – background vocals
- Chris Turner – background vocals
- Nick Movshon – bass, drums, engineering
- Alissia Benveniste – bass
- Homer Steinweiss – drums, engineering
- Conor Szymanski – drums
- Thomas Brenneck – guitars, piano, synthesizer
- Joe Crispiano – guitar
- Jonah Feingold – guitar
- Alex Greenwald – guitar, synthesizer
- Victor Axelrod – synthesizer
- Ivan Jackson – synthesizer, trumpet
- John Carroll Kirby – synthesizer
- Greg Phillinganes – synthesizer
- Leon Michaels – piano, synthesizer
- Daniel Bhattacharya – violin
- Charlie Bisharat – violin
- Fiona Brice – violin
- Chris Clad – violin
- Anna Croad – violin
- Francis Grimes – violin
- Marianne Haynes – violin
- Gerardo Hilera – violin
- Ian Humphries – violin
- Carrie Kennedy – violin
- Patrick Kiernan – violin
- Natalie Leggett – violin
- Kirsty Mangan – violin
- Eleanor Mathieson – violin
- Perry Montague-Mason – violin
- Steve Morris – violin
- Charles Mutter – violin
- Sara Parkins – violin
- Kerenza Peacock – violin
- Michele Richards – violin
- Jenny Sacha – violin
- Neil Samples – violin
- Sarah Sexton – violin
- Ellie Stamford – violin
- Christopher Tombling – violin
- Shalini Vijayan – violin
- Matthew Ward – violin
- Honor Watson – violin
- Deborah Widdup – violin
- Paul Willey – violin
- John Wittenberg – violin
- Nick Barr – viola
- Reiad Chibah – viola
- Tom Lea – viola
- Shawn Mann – viola
- Bryony Mycroft – viola
- Virginia Slater – viola
- Dave Walther – viola
- Katie Wilkinson – viola
- Rodney Wirtz – viola
- Katie Burke – cello
- Dave Daniels – cello
- Rosie Danvers – cello
- Katherine Jenkinson – cello
- Jo Knight – cello
- Jane Oliver – cello
- Roger Linley – double bass
- Richard Pryce – double bass
- Wayne Bergeron – flugelhorn
- Laura Brenes – French horn
- Dave Guy – trumpet
- Chris Elliot – arranger, conductor
- David Campbell – conductor
- Raymond Mason – conductor
- Riccardo Damian – engineering, mixing, programming
- Todd Monfalcone – engineering, mixing assistant
- Barry McCready – engineering
- Dylan Neustadter – engineering
- Leo Abrahams – engineering
- Nick Taylor – engineering
- Phil Joly – engineering
- Rob Bisel – engineering
- Rowan McIntosh – engineering
- Tyler Beans – engineering
- Jens Jungkurth – engineering
- Abby Echiverri – engineering assistant
- Mikayla Mundy – engineering assistant
- Matthew Scatchell – engineering assistant
- Tommy Vicari – horn and string engineer
- Martin Hollis – string engineer
- Joshua Blair – string engineer
- Serban Ghenea – mixing
- John Hanes – mixing assistant
- Randy Merrill – mastering

== Charts ==
Chart (2019)	Peak position
Australian Albums (ARIA)	7
Austrian Albums (Ö3 Austria)	67
Belgian Albums (Ultratop Flanders)	28
Belgian Albums (Ultratop Wallonia)	57
Canadian Albums (Billboard)	42
Dutch Albums (Album Top 100)	48
French Albums (SNEP)	47
German Albums (Offizielle Top 100)	56
Irish Albums (IRMA)	13
Japanese Albums (Oricon)	73
Latvian Albums (LAIPA)	23
Lithuanian Albums (AGATA)	9
New Zealand Albums (RMNZ)	33
Portuguese Albums (AFP)	49
Scottish Albums (Official Charts)	8
South Korean Albums (Gaon)	72
Spanish Albums (Promusicae)	93
Swiss Albums (Schweizer Hitparade)	20
UK Albums (Official Charts)	4
US Billboard 200	61

== Certifications ==
Region	Certification	Certified units/sales
Brazil (Pro-Música Brasil)	Gold	20,000^{‡}
New Zealand (RMNZ)	Gold	7,500^{‡}
Poland (ZPAV)	Platinum	20,000^{‡}
United Kingdom (BPI)	Gold	100,000^{‡}
^{‡} Sales+streaming figures based on certification alone.
