= Late Night Feelings (song) =

2019 single by Mark Ronson

- Remix single cover

Single by Mark Ronson featuring Lykke Li

from the album Late Night Feelings
- Released: 12 April 2019
- Genre: Disco
- Length: 4:11
- Label: Sony
- Songwriters: Mark Ronson; Ilsey Juber; Lykke Li Zachrisson; Stephen Kozmeniuk
- Producers: Mark Ronson; The Picard Brothers (co.); Da Honorable C.N.O.T.E. (add.); Jr Blender (add.)

Mark Ronson singles chronology
"Nothing Breaks Like a Heart" (2018)	"Late Night Feelings" (2019)	"Don't Leave Me Lonely" (2019)

Lykke Li singles chronology
"Two Nights" (2018)	"Late Night Feelings" (2019)	"No Hotel" (2022)

Music video
- "Late Night Feelings" on YouTube

"Late Night Feelings" is a song by English producer Mark Ronson featuring vocals from Swedish singer Lykke Li. Released on 12 April 2019, it is the title track and second single from his fifth studio album of the same name.

== Music ==
The Guardian said the song "pulls off the old disco trick of sounding simultaneously euphoric and yearning".

== Track listing ==
- Digital single'
1. "Late Night Feelings" (featuring Lykke Li) – 4:11
- Krystal Klear Remix'
1. "Late Night Feelings" (featuring Lykke Li) – 4:14
- Jax Jones Midnight Snack Remix'
1. "Late Night Feelings" (featuring Lykke Li) – 3:48
- Channel Tres Remix'
1. "Late Night Feelings" (featuring Lykke Li) – 4:19

== Charts ==
Chart (2019)	Peak position
Belgium (Ultratip Bubbling Under Flanders)	5
Belgium (Ultratip Bubbling Under Wallonia)	22
Iceland (RÚV)	10
Ireland (IRMA)	40
New Zealand Hot Singles (RMNZ)	21
Scotland (OCC)	17
Sweden Heatseeker (Sverigetopplistan)	11
UK Singles (OCC)	30
US Dance Club Songs (Billboard)	5

== Certifications ==
Region	Certification	Certified units/sales
Australia (ARIA)	Gold	35,000^{‡}
Poland (ZPAV)	Gold	10,000^{‡}
United Kingdom (BPI)	Platinum	600,000^{‡}
^{‡} Sales+streaming figures based on certification alone.

== Release history ==
List of release dates, showing region, format(s), version(s), label(s) and reference(s)
Region	Date	Format(s)	Version(s)	Label(s)	Ref.
Various	12 April 2019	Digital download; streaming	Original	Columbia	
Various	26 April 2019	Digital download; streaming	Krystal Klear remix	Columbia	
Italy	10 May 2019	Contemporary hit radio	Original	Sony	
Various	10 May 2019	Digital download; streaming	Jax Jones remix	Columbia	
Various	24 May 2019	Digital download; streaming	Channel Tres (singer) remix	Columbia	
