= BBC Music Awards =

Annual awards

- Awarded for: Best in popular music from the last 12 months
- Country: United Kingdom
- Presented by: BBC Music
- Hosted by: Fearne Cotton (2014–16); Chris Evans (2014–15); Claudia Winkleman (2016–17); Gemma Cairney (2016); Clara Amfo (2017)
- First award: 11 December 2014; 11 years ago
- Final award: 8 December 2017; 8 years ago
- Website: BBC Music Awards

Television/radio coverage
- Network: BBC One (2014–16); BBC Radio 1 (2014–16); BBC Radio 2 (2014–16); BBC Two (2017)
- Runtime: 120 minutes (2014–15); 90 minutes (2016); 60 minutes (2017)
- Produced by: Guy Freeman (executive); Cerrie Frost; Helen Riddell; Daniel Brookes

The BBC Music Awards were the BBC's annual pop music awards, held every December, as a celebration of the musical achievements over the past twelve months. The event was coordinated by the BBC's music division, BBC Music. Held between 2014 and 2017, an awards ceremony took place for the first three years which were broadcast live on BBC One. The final edition was scaled-back with no live awards ceremony held and was instead broadcast on BBC Two.

The overall purpose of the BBC Music Awards was to celebrate the music progression and production of the year in focus. The show looked at artists from the United Kingdom for a majority of the awards and provided other categories for international artists as well. The BBC looked at what songs, albums, and artists had been successful in the year both nationally and globally. The award shows also celebrated how an artist performed in a live setting, such as a large concert or music festival, held throughout the year. The live event, broadcast across TV, radio and online, included an opportunity for several artists to showcase their talent as they performed on the stage in front of the live audience.

== History ==
=== 2014 ===
The inaugural BBC Music Awards was held on 11 December 2014, broadcast live simultaneously across BBC One, BBC Radio 1 and BBC Radio 2. It was held at London's Earl's Court and presented by BBC Radio's Chris Evans and Fearne Cotton.

Artists who performed during the first awards ceremony included One Direction, will.i.am from The Black Eyed Peas and The Voice UK, George Ezra, Take That, Labrinth, Ella Henderson and Catfish and the Bottlemen.

An average audience of 3.9 million watched the ceremony live on BBC One, with a peak audience of 4.7 million at 21:00 GMT.

=== 2015 ===
The second BBC Music Awards took place on 10 December 2015. In 2015, the award for Best Live Performance was introduced, given to an artist who delivered a "stand out live moment" on the BBC. It was held in Birmingham at the Genting Arena.

=== 2016 ===
The third BBC Music Awards was announced on 28 October, stating it would take place on 12 December. It took place in London at ExCeL London. Two new awards were introduced, the BBC Radio 1 Live Lounge Performance of the Year award and the BBC Radio 2 Album of the Year award.

=== 2017 ===
On 21 November 2017, the BBC announced that the fourth BBC Music Awards would be scaled-back with no awards ceremony held. The awards were included as part of The Year In Music 2017, a new studio-based BBC Two programme hosted by Claudia Winkleman and Clara Amfo on 8 December. The show covered the One Love Manchester benefit concert held earlier in the year following the terrorist attack during an Ariana Grande concert in May and featured a larger influence of music than the years prior with new performances and archive broadcasts from different events.

The winners were:

- Live Performance of the Year – Foo Fighters at Glastonbury Festival
  - Boy Better Know at Glastonbury Festival
  - Chic at Glastonbury Festival
  - Depeche Mode at Glasgow Barrowland Ballroom
  - Katy Perry at BBC Radio 1's Big Weekend
  - U2 at The Joshua Tree Tour 2017
- Album of the Year – Rag'n'Bone Man, Human
  - Calvin Harris, Funk Wav Bounces Vol. 1
  - Dua Lipa, Dua Lipa
  - Ed Sheeran, ÷
  - Stormzy, Gang Signs & Prayer
  - The xx, I See You
- Artist of the Year – Stormzy
  - Ed Sheeran
  - Harry Styles
  - Kendrick Lamar
  - Lorde
  - Rag'n'Bone Man
- BBC Introducing Artist of the Year – Declan McKenna

== List of ceremonies ==
Year	Date	Venue	Broadcast	Introducing Artist of the Year	Hosts
2014	11 December	Earls Court Exhibition Centre	BBC One; BBC Radio 1 BBC Radio 2	Catfish and the Bottlemen	Fearne Cotton and Chris Evans
2015	10 December	Genting Arena	BBC One; BBC Radio 1 BBC Radio 2	Jack Garratt	Fearne Cotton and Chris Evans
2016	12 December	ExCeL London	BBC One; BBC Radio 1 BBC Radio 2	Izzy Bizu	Fearne Cotton, Claudia Winkleman and Gemma Cairney
2017	8 December	No awards ceremony	BBC Two	Declan McKenna	Claudia Winkleman and Clara Amfo

== Performances ==
Year	Performers (chronologically)
2014	Coldplay, Labrinth, Ella Henderson, Clean Bandit, Love Ssega, Jess Glynne, George Ezra, Gregory Porter, One Direction, Ed Sheeran, Calvin Harris, John Newman, Ellie Goulding, Catfish and the Bottlemen, Paloma Faith, Sigma, Take That, will.i.am, Cody Wise, Tom Jones and the BBC Concert Orchestra
2015	One Direction, Ellie Goulding, Stereophonics, Hozier, Little Mix, Omi, Jess Glynne, James Bay, Jack Garratt, The Shires, Paul Heaton, Jacqui Abbott, Years and Years, Faithless and Rod Stewart
2016	The 1975, Lukas Graham, Emeli Sandé, Coldplay, John Legend, Izzy Bizu, Kaiser Chiefs, Craig David, Zara Larsson and Robbie Williams
