= 2015 BBC Music Awards =

2nd award show of BBC Music

- Date: 10 December 2015
- Location: Genting Arena, Birmingham
- Hosted by: Chris Evans; Fearne Cotton
- Website: https://www.bbc.co.uk/events/e5rwhn

Television/radio coverage
- Network: BBC One; BBC Radio 1 BBC Radio 2

The 2015 BBC Music Awards was the second music award show, created out of the BBC's strategy for music, BBC Music, in 2015. The awards were held on 10 December 2015 at the new location of the Genting Arena in Birmingham following the closure on 13 December 2014 of the Earls Court Exhibition Centre in London, which held the inaugural event. Once again, the awards recognise the biggest and most exciting artists from the previous 12 months, as well as looking forward to new talent in 2016. A panel of judges decides the winners of each category, except 'Song of the Year', which is decided by the public.

The show was hosted by English television and radio hosts Chris Evans and Fearne Cotton. It was a rainy night and many fans lined up along the red carpet to take photos with the artists arriving.

Adele, Ed Sheeran, Hozier, Major Lazer and The Weeknd all had two nominations apiece, with Adele winning two awards and Hozier winning 'Song of the Year'.

== Performances ==
Artist(s)	Song(s)
One Direction	"Drag Me Down"
Ellie Goulding	"Love Me like You Do"
Stereophonics	"C'est la Vie"
Hozier	"Take Me to Church"
Little Mix	"Black Magic"
OMI	"Cheerleader"
Jess Glynne	"Hold My Hand"
James Bay	"Hold Back the River"
Jack Garratt	"Worry"
The Shires; Paul Heaton; Jacqui Abbott	"The Austerity of Love" "Nashville Grey Skies" "Leaving on a Jet Plane"
Years and Years	"King"
Rod Stewart	"Please" "Sailing"

BBC asked popular bands and solo artists to sing in front of the live audience on the night of the award show. The famous performers were shown at various parts of the evening in the audience, on the red carpet with fans and interviewers, and as they were preparing for their performance.

One Direction opened the show with their top charting single, "Drag Me Down". Their performance included the use of pyrotechnics as flames would rise up throughout their song. This performance was done without former band member, Zayn Malik (who now performs as Zayn), and was one of the final performances from the band before their hiatus (beginning in 2016).

Ellie Goulding sang her hit song, "Love Me Like You Do" from the Universal Pictures movie, Fifty Shades of Grey, that was released in February 2015. Accompanying her in the performance was the BBC Concert Orchestra in an orchestral rendition of the tune.

Another well received performance was done by pop girl group, Little Mix as they sang their popular song, "Black Magic".

To perform, "The Austerity of Love", "Nashville Grey Skies", and "Leaving on a Jet Plane" former South stars, Paul Heaton and Jacqui Abbot joined The Shires on stage.

Ending the show with "Please" and "Sailing" was rock singer Rod Stewart.

Several performances can be found on YouTube along with highlights, news discussions, and speeches from the winners of the evening.

== Nominations and winners ==
British Artist of the Year (presented by Rod Stewart)	International Artist of the Year (presented by Adil Ray)
Adele; Jamie xx; Florence and the Machine; Foals; Ed Sheeran; Years & Years	Taylor Swift; Foo Fighters; Hozier; Major Lazer; Prince; The Weeknd
Song of the Year (presented by Jo Whiley and Greg James)	BBC Live Performance of the Year (presented by Brian May)
Hozier – "Take Me to Church"; Jason Derulo – "Want to Want Me"; Jess Glynne – "Hold My Hand"; Ellie Goulding – "Love Me like You Do"; Wiz Khalifa featuring Charlie Puth – "See You Again"; Major Lazer and DJ Snake featuring MØ – "Lean On"; Omi – "Cheerleader" (Felix Jaehn remix); Mark Ronson featuring Bruno Mars – "Uptown Funk"; Ed Sheeran – "Bloodstream"; The Weeknd – "Can't Feel My Face"	"Adele at the BBC"; "Florence + the Machine (Glastonbury)"; "Jeff Lynne's ELO (Radio 2 in Concert)"; "Lionel Richie (Glastonbury)"; "Radio 1 Ibiza Prom (BBC Proms)"; "1Xtra Grime Prom (BBC Proms)"
BBC Introducing Award
Jack Garratt

Several artists were unable to make the award show the evening of the event. When Adele had won Performance of the Year and British Artist of the Year, she was on a prerecorded video call to accept the awards. At the time she was in the United States of America and could not be there in person. These awards were given to her after her recent single "Hello" released and helped her maintain her status as a popular artist. American singer, Taylor Swift won the International Artist of the Year award but could not make her appearance at the award show either while she was in Australia for her 1989 World Tour. Taylor also accepted her award over a prerecorded message for the audience. Both artists joked about the weight of the award in their acceptance speech. This joke continued in the evening as performer, Hozier, also referenced the weight of the award during his acceptance speech for Song of the Year for his international hit, "Take Me to Church". He also mentioned the possibility of the award being used as a weapon for the popular board game Cluedo. BBC awarded Jack Garratt for the BBC Introducing Artist of the Year.
