= The Last Artful, Dodgr =

American hip hop recording artist

- Also known as: The Last Artful; Dodgr; The L.A. Dodger
- Born: Alana Chenevert; May 26, 1987 (age 39)
- Origin: Los Angeles, California, United States
- Genres: Hip hop
- Occupations: Rapper; singer; songwriter
- Instrument: Vocals
- Years active: 2011–present
- Labels: EYRST; Fresh Selects

Alana Chenevert (born May 26, 1987), better known by her stage name The Last Artful, Dodgr, is an American hip hop recording artist from Portland, Oregon. She has been rapping and performing since 2011. In 2016 she gained wider recognition and acclaim following her single "Squadron" released via EYRST.

== Early life ==
The Last Artful, Dodgr grew up in Los Angeles, California and attended the Los Angeles Center for Enriched Studies from grades 6–12. She graduated from Humboldt State University in 2011 becoming a fixture at local hip-hop shows and as a DJ on KRFH.

== Career ==
Dodgr released her first mixtape, 199NVRLND, on July 1, 2013. In 2015, Dodgr signed with Portland independent music label EYRST, which was founded by former NBA player Martell Webster. Since signing with EYRST, Dodgr has released one extended play (EP) with Portland producer Neill Von Tally entitled Fractures and a collaborative EP with rapper Myke Bogan and Von Tally entitled Rare Treat. She has also released two non-album singles via EYRST, "Squadron," "Jelly Hunt;" and "Oofda," the first single off her and Von Tally's upcoming album Bone Music, to be released in 2017, which she also co-produced.

On November 16, 2016, Dodgr appeared on Late Night with Jimmy Fallon as a backup singer for Portland artist Aminé. The next day, November, 17th, she appeared on Sway Calloway's The Wake Up Show.

Dodgr and Von Tally released their first full-length album, Bone Music, on February 3, 2017, via EYRST. The album is eleven tracks and has features from fellow Portland artists Myke Bogan and Natasha Kmeto.

== Discography ==
=== LPs ===
- Bone Music (with Neill Von Tally)

=== Mixtapes ===
- 199NVRLND

=== Extended plays (EPs) ===
- Fractures (with Neill Von Tally)
- Rare Treat (with Myke Bogan and Neill Von Tally)

=== Singles ===
- "Squadron"
- "Jelly Hunt" (with Neill Von Tally)
- "Oofda"
- "Sway"
- "Caverns"
- "Jazz Crimes" (with Neill Von Tally)
- "Win Is Enough"
- "Hot / Wrong Way"
- "Better Safe Than Social"

=== Guest appearances ===
- "Anywhere" (Anderson Paak featuring Snoop Dogg & The Last Artful, Dodgr)
- "Quiet Trip", "Nature of the Beast" & "Fuel" (Black Thought featuring Portugal. The Man & The Last Artful, Dodgr)
- "The American Dream" (Blu & Exile featuring Miguel (singer) & The Last Artful, Dodgr)
