= Nothing Breaks Like a Heart =

2018 single by Mark Ronson featuring Miley Cyrus

Single by Mark Ronson featuring Miley Cyrus

from the album Late Night Feelings
- Released: 29 November 2018
- Recorded: 2018
- Studio: Shangri-La (Los Angeles, CA); Electric Lady Studios (New York, NY); Zelig Studios (Los Angeles, CA); British Grove Studios (London, England)
- Genre: Country-disco; pop
- Length: 3:37
- Label: RCA
- Songwriters: Mark Ronson; Miley Cyrus; Ilsey Juber; Conor Szymanski; Clément Picard; Maxime Picard; Thomas Brenneck
- Producers: Mark Ronson; Picard Brothers; Jamie xx

Mark Ronson singles chronology
"Diamonds Are Invincible" (2018)	"Nothing Breaks Like a Heart" (2018)	"Late Night Feelings" (2019)

Miley Cyrus singles chronology
"Younger Now" (2017)	"Nothing Breaks Like a Heart" (2018)	"Mother's Daughter" (2019)

Music video
- "Nothing Breaks Like a Heart" on YouTube

"Nothing Breaks Like a Heart" is a song by British musician Mark Ronson featuring American singer Miley Cyrus, released on 29 November 2018 by RCA Records as the lead single from Ronson's fifth studio album, Late Night Feelings (2019).

The song was a worldwide success, peaking at number 1 on eleven official charts, and reaching the top 5 on eleven other official charts. It peaked at number 2 on the UK Singles Chart and number 43 on the US Billboard Hot 100. The song was nominated for Song of the Year at the 2020 Brit Awards, marking Cyrus' first ever nomination.

== Background and promotion ==
Ronson and Cyrus reportedly wrote the track in May 2018, posting on social media that they were working together in the studio. In June 2018, Ronson said that the song was "coming soon". While it had been rumoured beforehand, the song title was later confirmed on the BBC's website listing for The Graham Norton Show. The single was announced on 25 November 2018 via Ronson's social media. The following day, Cyrus announced the single, ending her four-month hiatus from social media.

== Live performances ==
The track was first performed on The Graham Norton Show on 7 December 2018. Ronson and Cyrus also performed the track on Live Lounge on 13 December 2018 and Saturday Night Live on 15 December. On 28 January 2019, the duo performed on The Ellen DeGeneres Show. Cyrus joined Ronson to perform the song during his set at Radio 1's Big Weekend on 25 May 2019 and, in turn, he joined Cyrus during her set at the Glastonbury Festival on 30 June 2019.

== Chart performance ==
In the United States, "Nothing Breaks Like a Heart" debuted at number 67 on the Billboard Hot 100, becoming Cyrus' 46th and Ronson's third entry on the chart, and later peaked at number 43. In the United Kingdom, the single debuted at number 10 on the UK Singles Chart, making it Cyrus' fourth and Ronson's sixth top 10 song on the chart. The song eventually peaked at number two in January 2019.

== Music videos ==
Cyrus first teased the music video for "Nothing Breaks Like a Heart" on Twitter and Instagram on 26 November 2018. The video was filmed in October 2018 in Kyiv, Ukraine, with scenes taking place on the New Darnytskyi Bridge. It premiered on 29 November 2018. A vertical video of the song was released the following day, exclusively on Spotify. On 9 January 2019, the vertical video was uploaded on Cyrus' official YouTube channel.

=== Original video ===
The original music video was released through YouTube Premieres on 29 November 2018. The video begins with a news report of Cyrus driving a W220-generation Mercedes-Benz S-Class to an unknown destination, and being followed by law enforcement officers on the New Darnytskyi Bridge. Throughout the video, a television news report titled "Miley's Wild Ride" can be seen. The song was not available on YouTube prior to the release of this video.

== Track listings ==
Digital download
No.	Title	Length
1.	"Nothing Breaks Like a Heart" (featuring Miley Cyrus)	3:37

Digital download
No.	Title	Length
1.	"Nothing Breaks Like a Heart" (featuring Miley Cyrus) (Acoustic)	3:40

Digital download
No.	Title	Length
1.	"Nothing Breaks Like a Heart" (featuring Miley Cyrus) (Boston Bun Remix)	3:40

Digital download
No.	Title	Length
1.	"Nothing Breaks Like a Heart" (featuring Miley Cyrus) (Dimitri from Paris Remix)	3:32

Digital download
No.	Title	Length
1.	"Nothing Breaks Like a Heart" (featuring Miley Cyrus) (Martin Solveig Remix)	4:12

Digital download
No.	Title	Length
1.	"Nothing Breaks Like a Heart" (featuring Miley Cyrus) (Don Diablo Remix)	3:36

== Charts ==
=== Weekly charts ===
Chart (2018–2025)	Peak position
Argentina (Argentina Hot 100)	78
Australia (ARIA)	6
Australia Dance (ARIA)	1
Austria (Ö3 Austria Top 40)	20
Belgium (Ultratop 50 Flanders)	2
Belgium (Ultratop 50 Wallonia)	3
Bolivia (Monitor Latino)	10
Canada Hot 100 (Billboard)	19
Canada AC (Billboard)	25
Canada CHR/Top 40 (Billboard)	15
Canada Hot AC (Billboard)	14
CIS Airplay (TopHit)	105
Colombia (National-Report)	79
Croatia (HRT)	1
Czech Republic Airplay (ČNS IFPI)	1
Czech Republic Singles Digital (ČNS IFPI)	13
Denmark (Tracklisten)	12
Dominican Republic (SODINPRO)	49
France (SNEP)	29
Germany (GfK)	16
Germany Airplay (BVMI)	1
Greece Digital Songs (Billboard)	2
Hungary (Rádiós Top 40)	27
Hungary (Single Top 40)	1
Hungary (Stream Top 40)	1
Ireland (IRMA)	2
Israel (Media Forest)	1
Italy (FIMI)	33
Latvia (LAIPA)	14
Lebanon (Lebanese Top 20)	2
Lithuania (AGATA)	6
Mexico (Billboard Mexico Airplay)	20
Netherlands (Dutch Top 40)	4
Netherlands (Single Top 100)	22
New Zealand (Recorded Music NZ)	11
Norway (VG-lista)	19
Poland Airplay (ZPAV)	2
Portugal (AFP)	26
Romania (Airplay 100)	4
Scottish Singles Sales (Official Charts)	1
Slovakia Airplay (ČNS IFPI)	1
Slovakia Singles Digital (ČNS IFPI)	4
Slovenia (SloTop50)	1
Spain (Promusicae)	49
Sweden (Sverigetopplistan)	16
Switzerland (Schweizer Hitparade)	10
UK Singles (Official Charts)	2
Ukraine Airplay (TopHit)	75
US Billboard Hot 100	43
US Adult Contemporary (Billboard)	26
US Adult Pop Airplay (Billboard)	19
US Dance Club Songs (Billboard)	1
US Dance Airplay (Billboard)	5
US Pop Airplay (Billboard)	16
Venezuela (National-Report)	83

2025 weekly chart performance for "Nothing Breaks Like a Heart" (Damiano David Cover)
Chart (2025)	Peak position
Serbia Airplay (Radiomonitor)	20

=== Year-end charts ===
Chart (2018)	Position
Hungary (Single Top 40)	76
Chart (2019)	Position
Australia (ARIA)	41
Belgium (Ultratop Flanders)	15
Belgium (Ultratop Wallonia)	18
Canada (Canadian Hot 100)	61
Denmark (Tracklisten)	70
France (SNEP)	75
Germany (Official German Charts)	63
Hungary (Single Top 40)	31
Iceland (Tónlistinn)	40
Ireland (IRMA)	35
Netherlands (Dutch Top 40)	32
Netherlands (Single Top 100)	97
Poland (ZPAV)	6
Portugal (AFP)	114
Romania (Airplay 100)	19
Slovenia (SloTop50)	2
Switzerland (Schweizer Hitparade)	41
UK Singles (Official Charts Company)	28
US Dance Club Songs (Billboard)	21
Chart (2020)	Position
Hungary (Rádiós Top 40)	59
Chart (2025)	Position
Hungary (Rádiós Top 40)	42

== Certifications ==
Region	Certification	Certified units/sales
Australia (ARIA)	6× Platinum	420,000^{‡}
Austria (IFPI Austria)	Platinum	30,000^{‡}
Belgium (BRMA)	Gold	20,000^{‡}
Brazil (Pro-Música Brasil)	Diamond	160,000^{‡}
Canada (Music Canada)	2× Platinum	160,000^{‡}
Denmark (IFPI Danmark)	Platinum	90,000^{‡}
France (SNEP)	Diamond	333,333^{‡}
Germany (BVMI)	Platinum	400,000^{‡}
Italy (FIMI)	Platinum	50,000^{‡}
Mexico (AMPROFON)	Platinum+Gold	90,000^{‡}
New Zealand (RMNZ)	3× Platinum	90,000^{‡}
Norway (IFPI Norway)	Platinum	60,000^{‡}
Poland (ZPAV)	4× Platinum	80,000^{‡}
Portugal (AFP)	Gold	5,000^{‡}
Spain (Promusicae)	2× Platinum	120,000^{‡}
Switzerland (IFPI Switzerland)	Platinum	20,000^{‡}
United Kingdom (BPI)	2× Platinum	1,200,000^{‡}
United States (RIAA)	Platinum	1,000,000^{‡}
Streaming
Sweden (GLF)	Gold	4,000,000^{†}
^{‡} Sales+streaming figures based on certification alone.^{†} Streaming-only figures based on certification alone.

== Release history ==
"Nothing Breaks Like a Heart" release history
Region	Date	Format(s)	Version(s)	Label	Ref.
Various	29 November 2018	Digital download; streaming	Original	RCA	
Australia	30 November 2018	Radio airplay	Original	Columbia	
Italy	30 November 2018	Radio airplay	Original	Sony	
United States	3 December 2018	Adult contemporary radio; hot adult contemporary radio; modern adult contemporary radio	Original	RCA	
United States	4 December 2018	Contemporary hit radio	Original	RCA	
Various	21 December 2018	Digital download; streaming	Boston Bun remix	RCA	
Various	28 December 2018	Digital download; streaming	Dimitri from Paris remix	RCA	
Various	4 January 2019	Digital download; streaming	Acoustic	RCA	
Various	18 January 2019	Digital download; streaming	Martin Solveig remix	RCA	
Various	25 January 2019	Digital download; streaming	Don Diablo remix	RCA	
Various	13 April 2019	12-inch	Radio edit; Dimitri from Paris remix; Boston Bun remix	Columbia	

== See also ==
- List of Billboard number-one dance songs of 2019
