= Mark Ronson discography =

Discography of British-American musician Mark Ronson

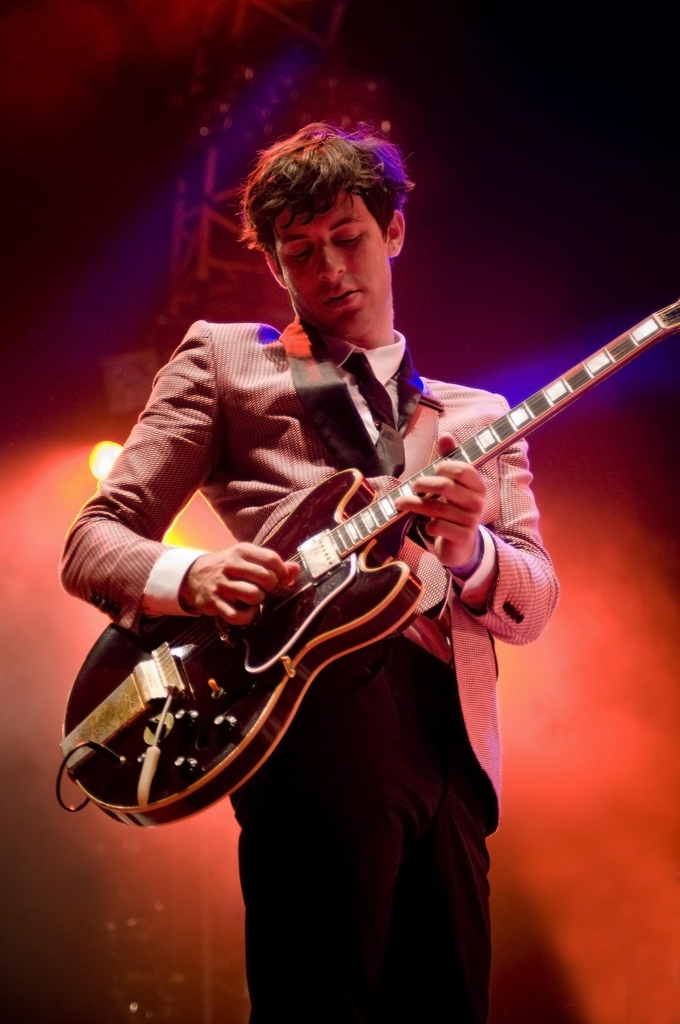
- Ronson performing at the 2008 North Sea Jazz Festival
- Studio albums: 5
- Singles: 22

British-American DJ, songwriter, record producer and record executive Mark Ronson has released five studio albums and twenty-two singles.

Here Comes the Fuzz, Ronson's debut studio album, was released in 2003 and was critically acclaimed and a financial success, despite initially poor sales. It included three top 10 hits and won Ronson a Brit Award for British Male Solo Artist in 2008. The best known song from the album, "Ooh Wee", samples "Sunny" by Boney M. and features Nate Dogg, Ghostface Killah, Trife Da God, and Saigon. It was featured that year in the film Honey and its soundtrack. The song was later used in Hitch and Harold & Kumar Escape from Guantanamo Bay.

The covers effort Version, Ronson's second studio album, was released in 2007. Ronson released a cover of The Smiths' track "Stop Me If You Think You've Heard This One Before" (in medley with The Supremes' "You Keep Me Hangin' On") under the shortened title "Stop Me" on 2 April 2007, featuring Australian singer and frequent collaborator Daniel Merriweather on vocals, which reached number two on the UK Singles Chart. The album also spawned a hit in the song "Valerie" sung by Amy Winehouse, a cover of another UK chart hit by The Zutons.

Record Collection, Ronson's third studio album, was released in 2010. The first single "Bang Bang Bang", which featured rapper Q-Tip and singer MNDR, was released on 12 July 2010, where it peaked at number 6 on the UK Singles Chart, giving Ronson his fourth top 10 hit. The second single from the album, "The Bike Song", was released on 19 September 2010 and features Kyle Falconer from The View and Spank Rock.

Uptown Special, Ronson's fourth studio album, was released on 13 January 2015. On 30 October 2014, Ronson announced on Twitter the release of the lead single of his upcoming album on 10 November 2014. The single, "Uptown Funk" features vocals from Bruno Mars. The song was performed on Saturday Night Live on 21 November 2014. "Uptown Funk" topped the Billboard Hot 100 on 7 January 2015, knocking Taylor Swift from the top spot. It gave Ronson his first number-one single in the US and Mars' sixth. The song has sold over 2.5 million copies in the US as of January 2015. The song also reached number one on the pop charts in the UK, Canada and Australia.

== Albums ==
=== Studio albums ===
List of studio albums, with selected details, chart positions, sales, and certifications
Title	Details	Peak chart positions									Sales	Certifications (sales threshold)
Title	Details	UK	AUS	BEL	FRA	IRE	NL	NZ	SWI	US	Sales	Certifications (sales threshold)
Here Comes the Fuzz	Released: 8 September 2003; Format: Digital download, CD; Label: Elektra	70	—	—	—	—	—	—	—	—	UK: 92,676	BPI: Silver
Version	Released: 16 April 2007; Format: Digital download, CD; Label: Allido, Columbia	2	—	—	—	21	44	—	51	129	UK: 884,532	BPI: 3× Platinum; RMNZ: Platinum
Record Collection (with The Business Intl.)	Released: 27 September 2010; Format: Digital download, CD; Label: Allido, RCA, Columbia, J	2	6	60	48	16	67	33	40	81	UK: 105,584	BPI: Gold; ARIA: Gold
Uptown Special	Released: 13 January 2015; Format: Digital download, CD, LP; Label: Sony	1	2	12	18	7	5	10	3	5	UK: 150,000	BPI: Gold; ARIA: Gold; RIAA: Platinum; RMNZ: 2× Platinum
Late Night Feelings	Released: 21 June 2019; Format: Digital download, CD, LP, MD, cassette, 8-track; Label: Sony	4	7	28	47	13	48	33	20	61		BPI: Gold; ARIA: Gold; RMNZ: Gold
"—" denotes an album that did not chart or was not released in that territory.

=== Soundtrack album ===
Title	Details
Watch the Sound with Mark Ronson (Apple TV+ Original Series Soundtrack)	Released: 30 July 2021; Format: Digital download, streaming; Label: Sony

== Singles ==
=== As lead artist ===
Title	Year	Peak chart positions										Certifications (sales threshold)	Album
Title	Year	UK	AUS	AUT	FRA	GER	IRE	NL	NZ	SWI	US	Certifications (sales threshold)	Album
"Ooh Wee" (featuring Ghostface Killah, Nate Dogg, Trife and Saigon)	2003	15	83	—	—	95	9	82	—	—	—	BPI: Silver	Here Comes the Fuzz
"Just" (featuring Alex Greenwald)	2006	48	—	—	—	—	—	—	—	—	—		Exit Music
"Stop Me" (featuring Daniel Merriweather)	2007	2	64	—	—	65	38	—	—	11	—	BPI: Silver	Version
"Oh My God" (featuring Lily Allen)	2007	8	72	—	—	—	21	—	—	—	—	BPI: Silver	Version
"Valerie" (featuring Amy Winehouse)	2007	2	—	5	—	3	3	1	39	4	—	BPI: 5× Platinum; ARIA: 3× Platinum; BVMI: Platinum; RMNZ: 7× Platinum	Version
"Wake Up Call" (with Maroon 5 featuring Mary J. Blige)	2007	—	—	—	—	—	—	—	—	—	—		Call and Response: The Remix Album and Soul Is Forever: The Remix Album
"Just" (featuring Phantom Planet)	2008	31	—	—	—	—	—	—	—	—	—		Version
"Bang Bang Bang" (with The Business Intl featuring MNDR and Q-Tip)	2010	6	16	75	—	43	18	68	25	65	—	BPI: Silver; ARIA: Platinum; RMNZ: Gold	Record Collection
"The Bike Song" (with The Business Intl featuring Kyle Falconer and Spank Rock)	2010	17	66	—	—	—	—	—	—	—	—		Record Collection
"Somebody to Love Me" (with The Business Intl featuring Boy George and Andrew Wyatt)	2010	55	—	—	—	—	—	—	—	—	—		Record Collection
"Anywhere in the World" (with Katy B)	2012	55	—	68	110	—	95	84	—	40	—		Non-album single
"Uptown Funk" (featuring Bruno Mars)	2014	1	1	6	1	3	1	1	1	1	1	BPI: 8× Platinum; ARIA: 22× Platinum; BVMI: 2× Platinum; IFPI AUT: Gold; NVPI: Platinum; RIAA: 11× Platinum; RMNZ: 9× Platinum; SNEP: Diamond	Uptown Special
"Daffodils" (featuring Kevin Parker)	2015	—	—	—	—	—	—	—	—	—	—		Uptown Special
"Feel Right" (featuring Mystikal)	2015	152	—	—	146	—	—	—	—	—	—		Uptown Special
"Diamonds Are Invincible" (with Michael Jackson)	2018	—	—	—	—	—	—	—	—	—	—		Non-album single
"Nothing Breaks Like a Heart" (featuring Miley Cyrus)	2018	2	6	20	29	16	2	22	11	10	43	BPI: 2× Platinum; ARIA: 6× Platinum; BVMI: Platinum; IFPI AUT: Gold; RIAA: Platinum; RMNZ: 3× Platinum; SNEP: Platinum	Late Night Feelings
"Late Night Feelings" (featuring Lykke Li)	2019	30	—	—	—	—	40	—	— (Note: "Late Night Feelings" did not enter the NZ Top 40 Singles Chart, but peaked at number 21 on the NZ Hot Singles Chart.)	—	—	BPI: Platinum; ARIA: Gold	Late Night Feelings
"Don't Leave Me Lonely" (featuring Yebba)	2019	58	—	—	—	—	—	—	— (Note: "Don't Leave Me Lonely" did not enter the NZ Top 40 Singles Chart, but peaked at number 34 on the NZ Hot Singles Chart.)	—	—	BPI: Silver	Late Night Feelings
"Find U Again" (featuring Camila Cabello)	2019	27	53	—	—	—	24	—	— (Note: "Find U Again" did not enter the NZ Top 40 Singles Chart, but peaked at number four on the NZ Hot Singles Chart.)	83	— (Note: "Find U Again" did not enter the Billboard Hot 100, but peaked at number two on the Bubbling Under Hot 100 chart.)	BPI: Silver; ARIA: Platinum; RMNZ: Gold	Late Night Feelings
"Pieces of Us" (featuring King Princess)	2019	—	—	—	—	—	—	—	— (Note: "Pieces of Us" did not enter the NZ Top 40 Singles Chart, but peaked at number 24 on the NZ Hot Singles Chart.)	—	—		Late Night Feelings
"I Want to See the Bright Lights Tonight" (featuring Raissa)	2020	—	—	—	—	—	—	—	—	—	—		Non-album singles
"Too Much" (featuring Lucky Daye)	2022	—	—	—	—	—	—	—	—	—	—		Non-album singles
"Ancora, ancora, ancora" (with Mina)	2023	—	—	—	—	—	—	—	—	—	—		Non-album singles
"Suzanne" (with Raye)	2025	34	—	—	—	—	—	—	—	—	—	BPI: Silver	Non-album singles
"—" denotes a single that did not chart or was not released in that territory.

=== As featured artist ===
Title	Year	Charts			Certifications	Album
Title	Year	UK	AUS	US	Certifications	Album
"Everyday" (ASAP Rocky featuring Rod Stewart, Miguel and Mark Ronson)	2015	56	49	92	BPI: Platinum; ARIA: Platinum; BVMI: Gold; RIAA: Gold; RMNZ: 4× Platinum	At. Long. Last. ASAP
"Easy" (Troye Sivan featuring Kacey Musgraves and Mark Ronson)	2020	—	—	—	ARIA: Gold; RIAA: Gold	Non-album singles
"Electricity" (Silk City with Dua Lipa featuring Mark Ronson)	2020	4	22	62	RMNZ: 2× Platinum	Non-album singles
"—" denotes a single that did not chart or was not released in that territory.

=== Promotional singles ===
Title	Year	Album
"Toxic" / "God Put a Smile upon Your Face" (featuring Ol' Dirty Bastard and Tiggers / featuring Daptone Horns)	2007	Version
"I Can't Lose" (featuring Keyone Starr)	2015	Uptown Special

== Other charted songs ==
Title	Year	Chart positions		Album
Title	Year	UK	US Rhy.	Album
"International Affair" (featuring Sean Paul and Tweet)	2003	—	21	Here Comes the Fuzz
"God Put a Smile upon Your Face" (featuring The Daptone Horns)	2007	63	—	Version
"No One Knows" (featuring Domino)	2007	66	—	Version
"—" denotes a song that did not chart.
