= Too Much =

Too Much may refer to:

== Music ==
=== Albums ===
- Too Much, by Bonaparte, or the title song, 2008

=== Songs ===
- "Too Much" (Blondie song), 2017
- "Too Much" (Bros song), 1989
- "Too Much" (Carly Rae Jepsen song), 2019
- "Too Much" (Cheap Trick song), 2003
- "Too Much" (Dave Matthews Band song), 1996
- "Too Much" (Dove Cameron song), 2025
- "Too Much" (Drake song), 2013
- "Too Much" (Elvis Presley song), 1957
- "Too Much" (Girl in Red song), 2024
- "Too Much" (The Kid Laroi, Jung Kook and Central Cee song), 2023
- "Too Much" (Marshmello and Imanbek song), 2020
- "Too Much" (Spice Girls song), 1997
- "Too Much" (Tara Kemp song), 1991
- "Too Much" (Zayn song), 2018
- "Too Much", by All Time Low from Nothing Personal, 2009
- "Too Much", by Arnis Mednis, representing Latvia in the Eurovision Song Contest 2001
- "Too Much", by the Easybeats from It's 2 Easy, 1966
- "Too Much", by Emeli Sandé from How Were We to Know, 2023
- "Too Much", by French Montana from Jungle Rules, 2017
- "Too Much", by The Game from Doctor's Advocate, 2006
- "Too Much", by Ghetto Concept, 1998
- "Too Much", by Guy Clark from Boats to Build, 1992
- "Too Much", by Kehlani from SweetSexySavage, 2017
- "Too Much", by Kylie Minogue from Aphrodite, 2010
- "Too Much", by Redfoo from Party Rock Mansion, 2016
- "Too Much", by Mark Ronson, 2022
- "Too Much", by Pepper from Kona Town, 2002
- "Too Much", by Pirates of the Mississippi from Walk the Plank, 1992
- "Too Much", by Sufjan Stevens from The Age of Adz, 2010
- "Too Much", by Tyga from Legendary, 2019
- "Too Much", by Zendaya from Zapped, 2014
- "Too Much", by Zion I from Heroes in the City of Dope, 2006

== Television ==
- Too Much (TV series), a 2025 American romantic comedy series
- "Too Much" (Private Practice), a 2012 episode

== Other uses ==
- Too Much (professional wrestling), later Too Cool, a professional wrestling tag team
- Too Much Media, an American software company

== See also ==
- "2 Much", a 2021 song by Justin Bieber from Justice
- Two Much, a 1995 American-Spanish romantic comedy film
- Two Much!, a 1960 album by Ann Richards and the Stan Kenton Orchestra
