= Mark Ronson =

English musician (born 1975)

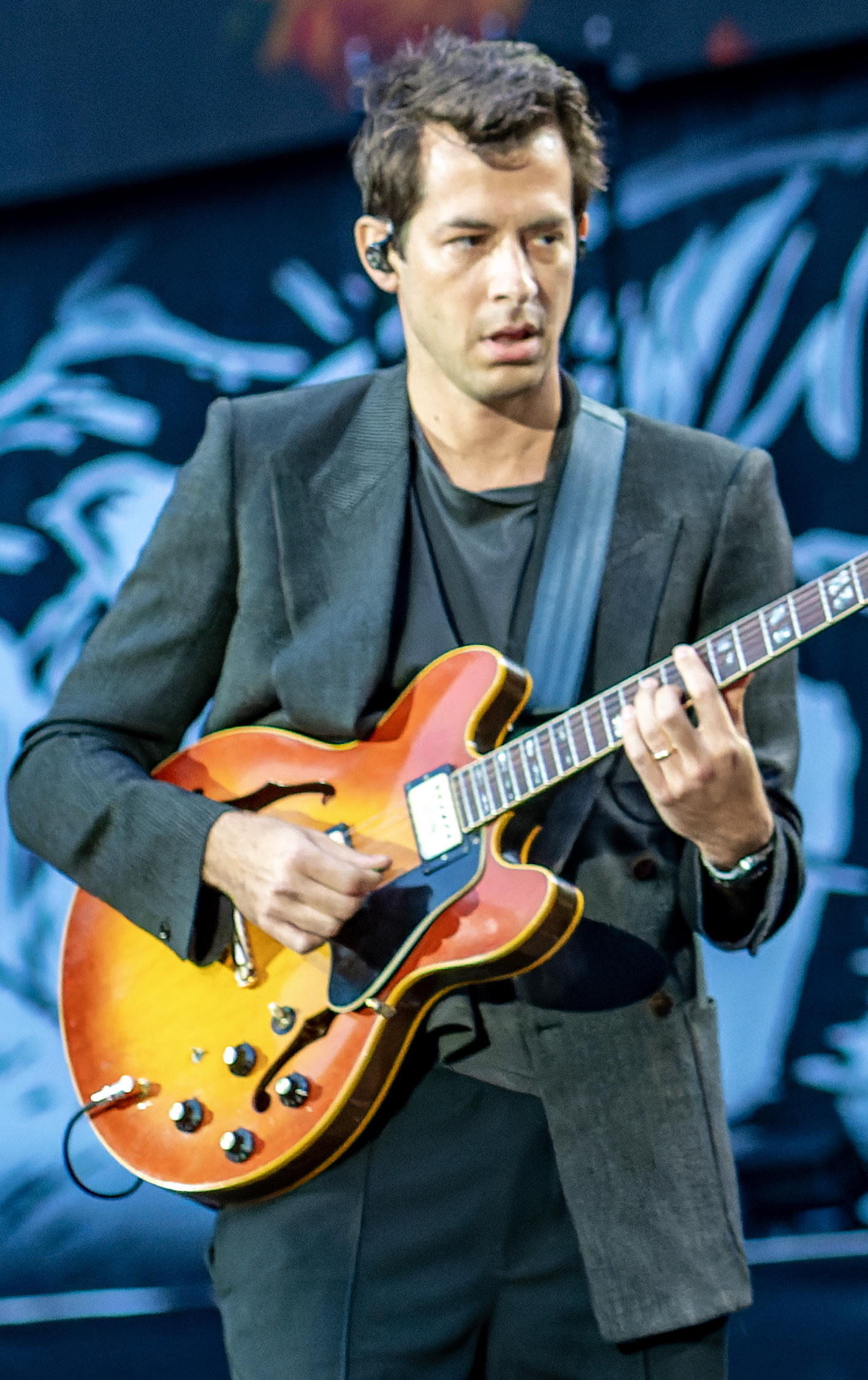
- Ronson performing in 2022
- Born: Mark Daniel Ronson; 4 September 1975 (age 51); London, England
- Other name: DJ Ronson
- Citizenship: United Kingdom; United States
- Education: Vassar College; New York University (BS)
- Occupations: Musician; record producer; disc jockey; songwriter
- Years active: 1993–present
- Works: Discography; production
- Spouses: Joséphine de La Baume (m. 2011; div. 2018) Grace Gummer (m. 2021)
- Children: 2
- Relatives: Charlotte Ronson (sister); Samantha Ronson (sister); Annabelle Dexter-Jones (half-sister)
- Awards: Full list
- Musical career
- Origin: New York City, U.S.
- Genres: Pop; hip-hop
- Instruments: Guitar; bass; keyboards; synthesiser
- Labels: Allido; Elektra; Columbia; RCA; J
- Member of: Silk City; The Soundhustlers
- Formerly of: The Flip Squad; Mark Ronson & The Business Intl.
- Website: markronson.co.uk

Signature
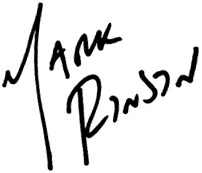

Mark Daniel Ronson (born 4 September 1975) is a British and American musician, record producer, songwriter and DJ. He has won ten Grammy Awards, including Producer of the Year for Amy Winehouse's album Back to Black (2006), as well as two for Record of the Year with her 2006 single "Rehab" and his own 2014 single "Uptown Funk" (featuring Bruno Mars). Ronson has also won an Academy Award for Best Original Song, a Golden Globe and a Grammy Award for co-writing "Shallow" (performed by Lady Gaga and Bradley Cooper) for the film A Star Is Born (2018).

Ronson signed with Elektra Records to release his debut studio album, Here Comes the Fuzz (2003), which contained guest performances from prominent American hip-hop acts and was met with lukewarm commercial reception. Due to this, he parted ways with Elektra the following year and co-founded his own label, Allido Records. By 2006, Ronson gained wider recognition for his production work on albums and singles for Lily Allen, Christina Aguilera, and Amy Winehouse.

During 2007, he signed with Columbia Records and released the Motown-funk cover singles "Stop Me" (featuring Daniel Merriweather) and "Valerie" (featuring Amy Winehouse), both of which peaked at number two on the UK Singles Chart in promotion of his second album, the covers effort Version (2007). It peaked at number two on the UK Albums Chart earned him the Brit Award for British Male Solo Artist. His third album, Record Collection (2010), matched its chart position and moderately entered the U.S. Billboard 200.

Ronson's 2014 single "Uptown Funk" (featuring Bruno Mars), yielded his furthest commercial success internationally, spending 14 consecutive weeks atop the U.S. Billboard Hot 100, seven non-consecutive weeks atop the UK Singles Chart, and becoming one of the best-selling singles of all-time. "Uptown Funk" served as the lead single for his fourth studio album Uptown Special (2015), which was dedicated to Winehouse and peaked atop the UK Albums Chart, as well as number five on the Billboard 200. In 2018, Ronson founded the record label Zelig Records, an imprint of Columbia Records, and formed the duo Silk City with fellow producer Diplo; their debut single, "Electricity" (featuring Dua Lipa) was released in September of that year and won a Grammy Award for Best Dance Recording.

Ronson was lead and executive producer for the soundtrack to the 2023 Greta Gerwig film Barbie, on which he also composed and co-wrote several of its songs with his production partner Andrew Wyatt. The soundtrack won three Grammy Awards—"What Was I Made For?" won Song of the Year and Best Song Written for Visual Media, while the parent album won Best Compilation Soundtrack for Visual Media—from 11 nominations, as well as an Academy Award for Best Original Song from two nominations. Ronson and Wyatt would collaborate with Gerwig again in 2026 for the soundtrack to her adaptation of Narnia: The Magician's Nephew for Netflix.

== Early life ==
Mark Daniel Ronson was born on 4 September 1975 in Notting Hill, London, to Laurence Ronson, a then music manager and publisher, now real estate developer, and Ann (née Dexter), a writer, jewellery designer, and socialite. His Ashkenazi Jewish ancestors emigrated from Austria, Lithuania, and Russia. Ronson was brought up in a Conservative Jewish household and became bar mitzvah.

After his parents' divorce, Ann married Foreigner guitarist Mick Jones. Jones wrote Foreigner's song "I Want to Know What Love Is" about his burgeoning relationship with her.

Ronson, along with his mother, stepfather, and sisters, moved to New York City when he was eight years old. Living on the Upper West Side of Manhattan, Ronson counted Sean Lennon among his childhood friends. At age 12, being a self-described music nerd, he pestered Rolling Stone founder Jann Wenner into an internship at the magazine. Ronson attended high school at the private Collegiate School in Manhattan before attending Vassar College and then New York University. In 2008, he obtained American citizenship so that he could vote in that year's presidential election.

=== Family ===
Ronson was born into the Ronson family, who were one of Britain's wealthiest families during the 1980s, and the founders of Heron International. His family lost $1 billion of their wealth in the property crash of the early 1990s. He is the nephew of businessman Gerald Ronson. Mark is not related to guitarist Mick Ronson.

Through his mother, Ronson is distantly related to British Conservative politicians Sir Malcolm Rifkind and Leon Brittan, and Odeon Cinemas founder Oscar Deutsch.

Ronson has two younger sisters: twins Charlotte, a fashion designer, and Samantha, a singer and DJ. Through his mother's second marriage to Mick Jones, Ronson has two older step-siblings and two half-siblings, including actress Annabelle Dexter-Jones. Through his father's second marriage, Ronson has three other half-siblings.

== Career ==
While attending New York University, Ronson became known as a DJ on the local club scene in the early 1990s. He played a diverse, genre-spanning selection, noting: "I've always loved everything. I've never had any kind of genre boundaries". In 1999, Ronson was featured in an ad for Tommy Hilfiger wearing the company's denim in the recording studio.

=== 2001–2005: Here Comes the Fuzz and initial producing ===
Ronson transitioned from DJ to producer after Nikka Costa's manager, Dominique Trenier, heard one of his sets and introduced him to several musicians. Ronson produced Costa's song "Everybody Got Their Something", and Ronson soon signed a record contract with Elektra Records. He had already produced tracks for Hilfiger ads and, in 2001, used the connection to have Costa's single "Like a Feather" feature in an advertisement.

Ronson's debut album, Here Comes the Fuzz, was released in 2003 and according to a retrospective review "the record sold poorly and (...) critical reception was lukewarm at best, dismissive at worst". The album featured performances from artists from diverse genres, including Mos Def, Jack White, Sean Paul, Nappy Roots and Rivers Cuomo. The lead single "Ooh Wee," reached no. 15 on the UK Singles Chart, and was used in a number of films, including in Honey (2003). Two weeks after releasing Here Comes the Fuzz, Elektra Records dropped Ronson. In 2004, Ronson formed his own record label, Allido Records, a subsidiary of Sony BMG's J Records, along with his longtime manager Rich Kleiman.

=== 2006–2009: Version ===
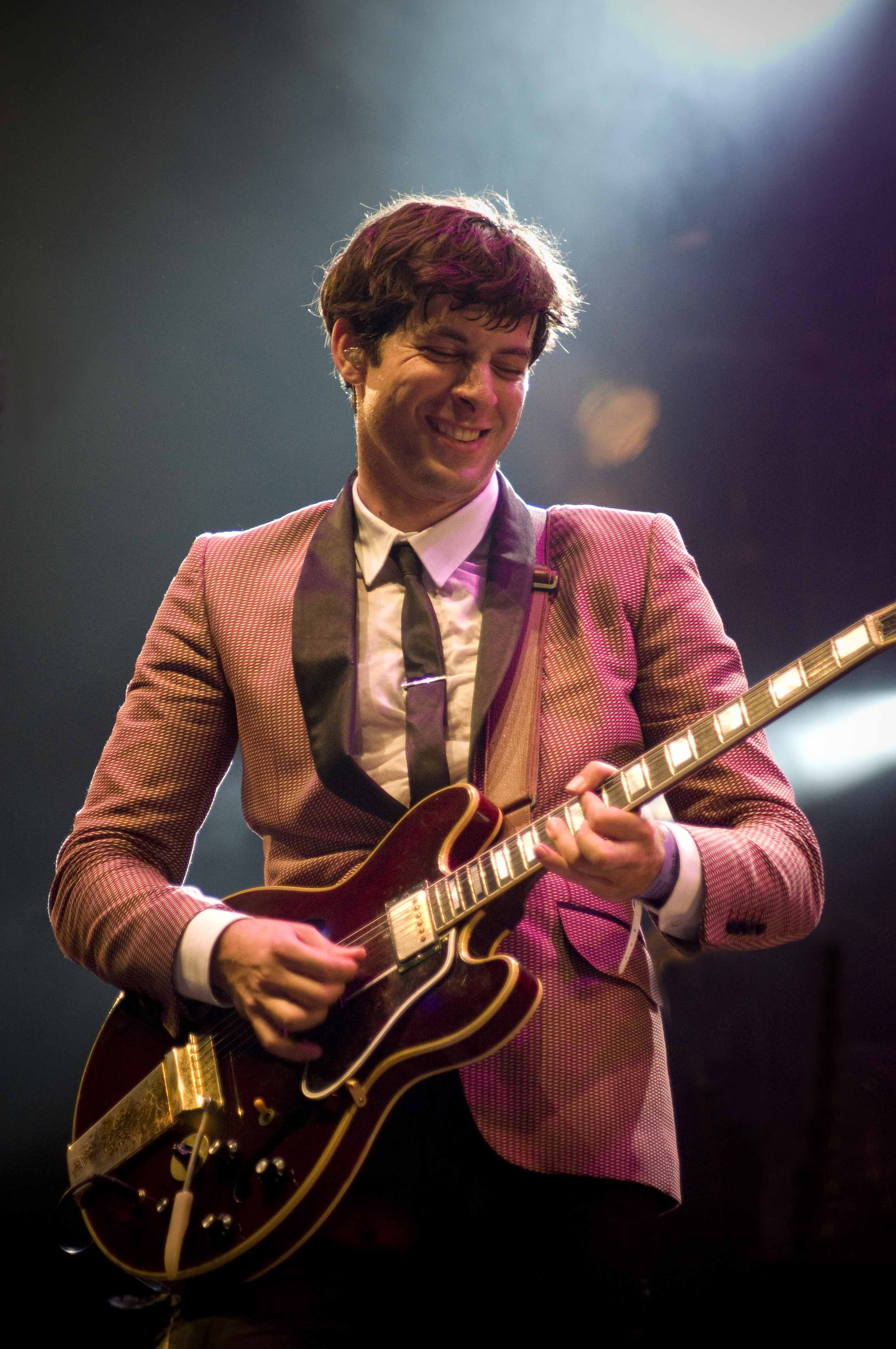
Ronson performing at the 2008 North Sea Jazz Festival

On 2 April 2007, Ronson released a cover of The Smiths' track "Stop Me If You Think You've Heard This One Before", in medley with the Supremes' "You Keep Me Hangin' On", under the shortened title "Stop Me", featuring Australian singer and frequent collaborator Daniel Merriweather. It reached number 2 in the UK singles charts, giving Ronson his highest-peaking single until 2014's "Uptown Funk". Ronson remixed the Bob Dylan song "Most Likely You Go Your Way And I'll Go Mine" in promotion for the three-disc Bob Dylan collection titled Dylan released October 2007. Ronson has also produced Candie Payne's single "One More Chance" in 2007. The cover album Version appeared on his own label with Alexis Petridis describing the song interpretations as "an affectionate pastiche of a 60s soul revue's brass-laden sound". In May 2007 it was awarded the title Album of the Month by the British dance music magazine, Mixmag. On 23 June, Ronson made the cover of The Guardian newspaper's Guide magazine, alongside singer Lily Allen.

In June 2007, Ronson signed DC hip-hop artist Wale to Allido Records. In late 2007, he focused on production, working with Daniel Merriweather on his debut album, and recording again with Amy Winehouse and Robbie Williams. On 24 October 2007, Ronson performed a one-off set at The Roundhouse in Camden, London as part of the BBC Electric Proms 2007. The performance featured the BBC Concert Orchestra and included special guests Terry Hall, Sean Lennon, Tim Burgess, Alex Greenwald, Ricky Wilson (substituting for Lily Allen), Charlie Waller of The Rumble Strips, Adele and Kyle Falconer.

In December 2007, Ronson received his first Grammy Award nomination, for Producer of the Year, Non-Classical. Ronson's work with Amy Winehouse also received substantial accolades, gaining 6 nominations. Winehouse's Back to Black album, mostly produced by Ronson, was nominated for Album of the Year and Best Pop Vocal Album. Her song "Rehab" received nods for Best Female Pop Vocal Performance, Song of the Year and Record of the Year. Ronson would go on to win three Grammys: Producer of the Year as well as Best Pop Vocal Album and Record of the Year (the latter two of which he shared with Amy Winehouse) in early February 2008.

Ronson is credited as producer on a mixtape album called Man in the Mirror, released in January 2008 by the rapper Rhymefest which is a tribute to the pop star Michael Jackson. The album features Rhymefest appearing to speak to Michael Jackson using archive audio from interviews with the pop star. The same month Ronson received three nominations for the Brit Awards, including 'Best Male Solo Artist,' 'Best Album' (Version) and 'Song of the Year' ("Valerie"). Ronson won his first Brit for 'Best Male Solo Artist' in mid-February 2008 over favourite Mika. He also performed a medley of Coldplay's "God Put a Smile upon Your Face" with Adele, "Stop Me" with Daniel Merriweather, and "Valerie" with Amy Winehouse. The performance allowed for a large boost in sales in the iTunes UK Top 100. "Valerie" would jump almost 30 spots in the days after the event, while "Just", "Stop Me" and "Oh My God" all appeared in the chart as well. That same week, Ronson appeared twice in the UK Top 40, with "Valerie" rebounding to number 13 and "Just" at number 31, his fourth Top 40 entry from "Version". The Brits performance also allowed for "Version" to climb 18 spots to number 4.

Around this time, Ronson received his first number one on an international chart (Dutch Top 40) for "Valerie," which spent four consecutive weeks at the top of the chart. He collaborated with the Kaiser Chiefs on their third album. Ronson toured the album "Version" extensively through both the UK and Europe during 2008. Notable sold-out performances at The Hammersmith Apollo and Brixton Academy. Ronson is known to champion new upcoming artists on the road with him, such as Sam Sparro and Julian Perretta. Ronson's string backing was provided by the all-female string quartet Demon Strings.

On 2 July 2008, in Paris, Ronson performed live with Duran Duran for an invited audience. They played new arrangements by Ronson of some Duran Duran songs, along with tracks from the band's new album, Red Carpet Massacre. Ronson & the Version Players also performed songs from his album Version. Simon Le Bon sang. As of March 2009, Ronson was working with the group on their 13th album. The Album, titled All You Need Is Now, was released digitally exclusively via Apple's iTunes on 21 December 2010, while the physical CD was released in March 2011 with additional tracks. In 2013–14 Ronson was once again in the studio producing Duran Duran's 14th album, Paper Gods, making it the first time the band has worked with the same producer on consecutive albums since Colin Thurston produced their first two albums in the 1980s.

=== 2010–2012: Record Collection ===
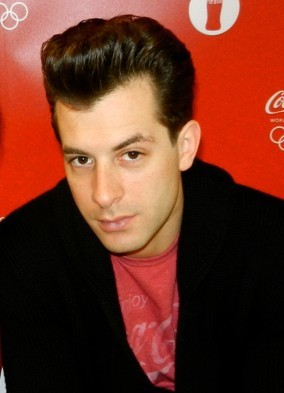
Ronson in 2011

In the spring of 2010, Ronson confirmed the name of his new album Record Collection, and said that he hoped to have it out by September 2010. Additionally, Ronson announced the name of his new band, "The Business Intl.'", which is the alias adopted by Ronson on the third studio album. The first single, "Bang Bang Bang," which featured rapper Q-Tip and singer MNDR, was released on 12 July 2010, where it peaked at number 6 on the UK Singles Chart, giving Ronson his fourth Top 10 single. The single also entered the Irish Singles Chart, where it peaked at number 18. The second single from the album, "The Bike Song", was released on 19 September 2010, and features the Scottish musician Kyle Falconer from The View and the American rapper Spank Rock. The album was released on 27 September 2010. This is the first Ronson album on which he features as a singer.

Although Ronson had never met Michael Jackson, he was given the vocal track to a song titled "Lovely Way", sung by Jackson, in 2010 to produce for his posthumous album Michael. He submitted the track, but it did not make the tracklisting for Michael. Ronson said about the rumours surrounding the vocals on the track (due to the controversy surrounding the Cascio tracks on that same album), "It was definitely him singing. I was given a vocal track to work with but I never actually met Michael. [...] It's in the vein of Elton John's 'Goodbye Yellow Brick Road' and John Lennon's 'Imagine'." He provided the score for the 2011 film Arthur. Ronson was one of the artists featured in the 2012 documentary Re:GENERATION Music Project. His song "A La Modeliste" features Mos Def, Erykah Badu, Trombone Shorty, members of The Dap-Kings, and Zigaboo Modeliste.

=== 2013–2017: Uptown Special and Amy ===
On 30 October 2014, Ronson announced, via Twitter, a new single from his upcoming album, to be released on 10 November 2014. The single, "Uptown Funk," features the American singer-songwriter Bruno Mars on vocals. On 22 November 2014, Ronson and Mars appeared as the musical guest on Saturday Night Live performing "Uptown Funk" and "Feel Right" (featuring Mystikal). "Uptown Funk" reached number one in the UK and US singles charts, and also became the all-time most streamed track in a single week in the UK, having been streamed a record 2.49 million times in a week. "Uptown Funk" reached the top 10 in nearly every country it charted; it spent fifteen weeks at number one on the Canadian Hot 100, fourteen weeks at number one on the Billboard Hot 100, and seven weeks at number one on the UK Singles Chart. In February 2015 the song won Ronson the Brit Award for British Single of the Year. As of August 2022, the song's music video on YouTube has amassed over 4.6 billion views. In 2015, Ronson starred in the documentary film Amy about his late friend Amy Winehouse. His voice features in the film where he talks about his career and relationship with Winehouse and there is footage of Ronson from the recording session of the single "Back to Black" from March 2006 and also at Winehouse's funeral in London in July 2011. On 16 October 2015, Ronson became a patron of the Amy Winehouse Foundation. In January 2016, Ronson was nominated for two Brit Awards; Best British Male Solo Artist, and British Producer of the Year, at the 2016 Brit Awards.

At the 2016 Grammy Awards Ronson won two awards for "Uptown Funk", including Record of the Year. Jason Iley, the head of Sony Music UK and Ronson's UK label Columbia Records, hailed Ronson as "a true gentleman" and "one of the most considerate, kind and humble artists in our industry." He added, "the monumental success of Uptown Funk is so thoroughly deserved and has established itself as, not only one of the Records of the Year but of our lifetime." At the Super Bowl 50 Halftime Show Ronson performed "Uptown Funk" with Mars. He went on to executive produce Lady Gaga's fifth album, Joanne. Ronson produced the Queens of the Stone Age's 2017 album Villains.

=== 2018–present: Silk City, "Shallow", Late Night Feelings and Night People ===
In 2018, Ronson founded his own label, Zelig Records, an imprint of Columbia Records and the first artist he signed was singer King Princess. He formed the duo Silk City with fellow producer Diplo. Their first single "Electricity" featuring Dua Lipa was released on 6 September and peaked at the US Dance Club Songs and received the Grammy Award for Best Dance Recording at the 61st Annual Grammy Awards.

In May 2018, it was revealed that Ronson was working with the American singer Miley Cyrus in the studio. Their first collaboration "Nothing Breaks Like a Heart" was released in November 2018. Ronson also co-wrote the song "Shallow" for the film A Star Is Born with his frequent collaborators Lady Gaga, Andrew Wyatt, and Anthony Rossomando. The song earned Ronson an Academy Award and the Golden Globe Award for Best Original Song, as well as two Grammy nominations, winning the Grammy Award for Best Song Written for Visual Media.

On 12 April 2019, it was announced that Ronson would release his fifth album, Late Night Feelings, on 26 June 2019. The album features Cyrus, Angel Olsen, Lykke Li and Camila Cabello. Ronson has described the album as a collection of "sad bangers," with the title track laying down a warm mid-tempo dance groove under Li's melancholy vocals. On 12 October 2019, BBC Two broadcast the documentary Mark Ronson: From the Heart, directed by Carl Hindmarch. In June 2021, Ronson, along with the Foo Fighters, shared a "re-version" of their single "Making a Fire".

In 2023, Ronson was announced as the executive producer of Barbie the Album, the soundtrack of the film Barbie by Greta Gerwig. In addition to executive producing the album, Ronson also served as co-producer and co-writer on several of the tracks, including "Dance the Night", "What Was I Made For?", "Man I Am", and "I'm Just Ken". He co-wrote the score of the film. In October 2023 Ronson released a remixed version of Mina's classic "Ancora, ancora, ancora". The song premiered at Gucci’s runway at Milan Fashion Week in September 2023.

Ronson's debut memoir Night People: How To Be A DJ in ‘90s New York City was published by Grand Central Publishing on 16 September 2025. He received the Brit Award for Outstanding Contribution to Music at the Brit Awards in February 2026.

== Personal life ==
Ronson divides his time among London, Los Angeles, and New York. Since childhood, he has been a fan of English Premier League football club Chelsea F.C. He is also a fan of the New York Knicks.

In 2009, Ronson was voted the most stylish man in the UK by GQ magazine.

In 2011, a portrait of Ronson was painted by British artist Joe Simpson; the painting was exhibited around the UK, including a solo exhibition at the Royal Albert Hall in London.

In 2015, he was named one of the magazine's 50 best-dressed British men.

On 20 August 2019, Ronson and several other celebrities invested in a funding round for Lowell Herb Co, a California cannabis brand. He is known to be "a dedicated cannabis consumer".

Ronson was friends with American singer, actress, and model Aaliyah, meeting her at a photoshoot for Tommy Hilfiger and staying friends until her death in 2001.

=== Relationships ===
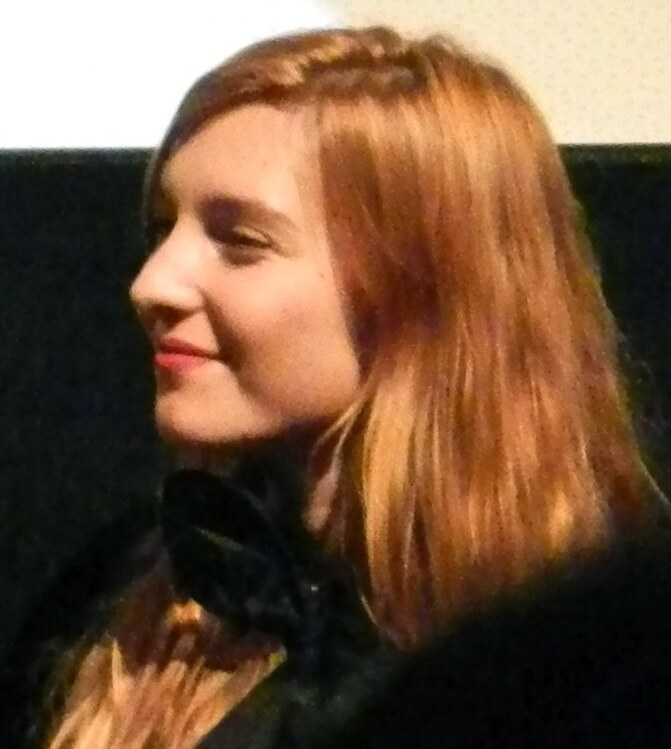
Ronson's first wife Joséphine de La Baume in 2014

Ronson's second wife Grace Gummer at the 2026 Met Gala

In 2001, Ronson began dating the American actress Rashida Jones. They were engaged in March 2003, after Ronson proposed by creating a crossword puzzle with the message "Will you marry me." Their relationship ended about a year later.

On 3 September 2011, Ronson married French actress and singer Joséphine de La Baume, who had appeared in the music video for "The Bike Song". On 16 May 2017, it was reported that de La Baume had filed for divorce from Ronson, listing the separation date as 21 April 2017. The divorce was finalized in October 2018.

On 4 September 2021, Ronson announced his marriage to actress Grace Gummer, after a year of dating. On 13 October 2022, Gummer and Ronson announced they were expecting their first child. Their daughter was born in December 2022. In February 2025 they welcomed their second daughter.

== Discography ==
- Here Comes the Fuzz (2003)
- Version (2007)
- Record Collection (with The Business Intl.) (2010)
- Uptown Special (2015)
- Late Night Feelings (2019)

== Filmography ==
- Zoolander (2001) – Himself
- Behind the Music: Remastered (2010) – Himself; Episode: "Duran Duran"
- Amy (2015) – Himself
- Gaga: Five Foot Two (2017) – Himself
- Spies in Disguise (2019) – Agency Control Room Technician (cameo)
- Freedom Uncut (2022) – Himself
- Getting It Back: The Story of Cymande (2022) – Himself

=== Videos ===
Ronson created a video, along with directors Gary Breslin and Jordan Galland, called Circuit Breaker, which was an homage to the video game The Legend of Zelda: A Link to the Past. In 2001, Ronson appeared in the Aaliyah music video "More Than a Woman", as a DJ; the video was released in January 2002, five months after Aaliyah's August 2001 death in a plane crash. On 30 July 2021, the documentary series Watch the Sound with Mark Ronson was released on Apple TV+.

=== Film soundtrack ===
Song	Year	Album	Co-Artist(s)
"Grandma Calls the Boy Bad News"	2025	F1 the Album	Rachel Keen, Christopher Braun, Homer Steinweiss, Nick Movshon, Victor Axelrod

== Production discography ==
Adapted from AllMusic.

Year	Artist	Track	Album	Details
1998	The Flip Squad	"Turntables"	The Flip Squad All-Star DJs	
1998	The Flip Squad	"Only Time You Love 'Em"	The Flip Squad All-Star DJs	
1999	The High & Mighty		Home Field Advantage	Additional programming
2001	Nikka Costa	"Like a Feather"	Everybody Got Their Something	Co-producer, co-writer
2001	Nikka Costa	"So Have I for You"	Everybody Got Their Something	Co-producer, co-writer
2001	Nikka Costa	"Tug of War"	Everybody Got Their Something	Co-producer, co-writer
2001	Nikka Costa	"Everybody Got Their Something"	Everybody Got Their Something	Co-producer, co-writer
2001	Nikka Costa	"Nothing"	Everybody Got Their Something	Co-producer, co-writer
2001	Nikka Costa	"Nikka What?"	Everybody Got Their Something	Co-producer, co-writer
2001	Nikka Costa	"Hope It Felt Good"	Everybody Got Their Something	Co-producer, co-writer
2001	Nikka Costa	"Some Kind of Beautiful"	Everybody Got Their Something	Co-producer, co-writer
2001	Nikka Costa	"Nikka Who?"	Everybody Got Their Something	Co-producer, co-writer
2001	Nikka Costa	"Just Because"	Everybody Got Their Something	Co-producer, co-writer
2001	Nikka Costa	"Push & Pull"	Everybody Got Their Something	Co-producer, co-writer
2001	Nikka Costa	"Corners of My Mind"	Everybody Got Their Something	Co-producer, co-writer
2001	Nikka Costa	"I Don't Want to Be the Rain	Everybody Got Their Something	Co-producer, co-writer
2001	Nikka Costa	"Call Me" (Blondie cover)	Zoolander (Music From The; Motion Picture)	Co-producer
2002	Jimmy Fallon	"Idiot Boyfriend"	The Bathroom Wall	Bass, backing vocals, keyboards, mixing
2002	Jimmy Fallon	"(I Can't Play) Basketball"	The Bathroom Wall	Bass, backing vocals, keyboards, mixing
2002	Jimmy Fallon	"Drinking in the Woods"	The Bathroom Wall	Bass, backing vocals, keyboards, mixing
2002	Jimmy Fallon	"Road Rage"	The Bathroom Wall	Bass, backing vocals, keyboards, mixing
2002	Jimmy Fallon	"Snowball"	The Bathroom Wall	Bass, backing vocals, keyboards, mixing
2002	Sean Paul	"International Affair" (feat. Debi Nova)	Dutty Rock	
2002	Saigon	"The Corner"	The Best of Saigon a.k.a.The; Yardfather Volume 1	
2003	Macy Gray	"When I See You"	The Trouble with Being Myself	Guitar
2003	Macy Gray	"It Ain't the Money" (feat. Pharoahe Monch)	The Trouble with Being Myself	Programming, turntables
2003	Macy Gray	"Screamin'"	The Trouble with Being Myself	Guitar
2003	Mark Ronson	"Intro"	Here Comes the Fuzz	
2003	Mark Ronson	"Bluegrass Stain'd" (feat. Nappy Roots and Anthony Hamilton)	Here Comes the Fuzz	
2003	Mark Ronson	"Ooh Wee" (feat. Ghostface Killah, Nate Dogg, Trife Diesel and Saigon)	Here Comes the Fuzz	
2003	Mark Ronson	"High" (feat. Aya)	Here Comes the Fuzz	
2003	Mark Ronson	"I Suck" (feat. Rivers Cuomo)	Here Comes the Fuzz	
2003	Mark Ronson	"International Affair" (feat. Sean Paul and Tweet)	Here Comes the Fuzz	
2003	Mark Ronson	"Diduntdidunt" (feat. Saigon)	Here Comes the Fuzz	
2003	Mark Ronson	"On the Run" (feat. Mos Def and M.O.P.)	Here Comes the Fuzz	
2003	Mark Ronson	"Here Comes the Fuzz" (feat. Freeway and Nikka Costa)	Here Comes the Fuzz	
2003	Mark Ronson	"Bout to Get Ugly" (feat. Rhymefest and Anthony Hamilton)	Here Comes the Fuzz	
2003	Mark Ronson	"She's Got Me" (feat. Daniel Merriweather)	Here Comes the Fuzz	
2003	Mark Ronson	"Tomorrow" (feat. Q-Tip and Debi Nova)	Here Comes the Fuzz	
2003	Mark Ronson	"Rashi (Outro)"	Here Comes the Fuzz	
2003	Mark Ronson	"NYC Rules" (feat. Daniel Merriweather and Saigon)	Here Comes the Fuzz	
2005	Ol' Dirty Bastard	"Dirty Dirty"	Osirus	Producer and co-writer
2005	Terry Sullivan		TheErthMoovsAroundTheSun	Guitar
2005	Teriyaki Boyz	"The Takeover"	Beef or Chicken	Producer
2006	Mark Ronson	"Just" (feat. Alex Greenwald)	Exit Music: Songs with Radio Heads	Radiohead cover
2006	Lily Allen	"Littlest Things"	Alright, Still	Co-producer, co-writer
2006	Lily Allen	"Smile" (version revisited)	Alright, Still	Remix artist
2006	Rhymefest	"Devil's Pie"	Blue Collar	Producer
2006	Rhymefest	"Tell a Story"	Blue Collar	Producer
2006	Rhymefest	"Build Me Up" (feat. Ol' Dirty Bastard)	Blue Collar	Producer
2006	Christina Aguilera	"Slow Down Baby"	Back to Basics	Co-producer, guitars, bass, beats, keyboards, engineer
2006	Christina Aguilera	"Without You"	Back to Basics	Co-producer, guitars, bass, beats, keyboards, engineer
2006	Christina Aguilera	"Welcome"	Back to Basics	Co-producer, guitars, bass, beats, keyboards, engineer
2006	Christina Aguilera	"Hurt"	Back to Basics	Co-producer, guitars, bass, beats, keyboards, engineer
2006	Amy Winehouse	"Rehab"	Back to Black	
2006	Amy Winehouse	"You Know I'm No Good"	Back to Black	
2006	Amy Winehouse	"Back to Black"	Back to Black	
2006	Amy Winehouse	"Love Is a Losing Game"	Back to Black	
2006	Amy Winehouse	"Wake Up Alone"	Back to Black	
2006	Amy Winehouse	"He Can Only Hold Her"	Back to Black	
2006	Amy Winehouse	"You Know I'm No Good" (remix feat. Ghostface Killah)	Back to Black	
2006	Amy Winehouse	"Rehab" (Hot Chip remix)	Back to Black	
2006	Amy Winehouse	"Back to Black" (The Rumble Strips remix)	Back to Black	
2006	Robbie Williams	"Lovelight"	Rudebox	Producer, guitar, bass, beats, keyboards, turntables, percussion, engineer
2006	Robbie Williams	"Bongo Bong and Je ne t'aime plus"	Rudebox	Producer, guitar, bass, beats, keyboards, turntables, percussion, engineer
2006	Robbie Williams	"Keep On"	Rudebox	Producer, guitar, bass, beats, keyboards, turntables, percussion, engineer
2006	Robbie Williams	"Good Doctor"	Rudebox	Producer, guitar, bass, beats, keyboards, turntables, percussion, engineer
2006	Rhymefest & Samantha Ronson	"Wanted"	Half Nelson: Original Motion; Picture Soundtrack	
2006	Saigon	"The Corner"	Half Nelson: Original Motion; Picture Soundtrack	
2006	Ghostface Killah	"You Know I'm No Good"	More Fish	Producer
2007	Wale	"Let's Ride"	100 Miles & Running	Producer
2007	Wale	"Smile" (remix) (Feat. Lily Allen)	100 Miles & Running	Producer
2007	Mark Ronson	"God Put a Smile upon Your Face" (feat. the Daptone Horns)	Version	Coldplay cover
2007	Mark Ronson	"Oh My God" (feat. Lily Allen)	Version	Kaiser Chiefs cover
2007	Mark Ronson	"Stop Me" (feat. Daniel Merriweather)	Version	The Smiths and the Supremes cover
2007	Mark Ronson	"Toxic" (feat. Ol' Dirty Bastard and Tiggers)	Version	Britney Spears cover
2007	Mark Ronson	"Valerie" (feat. Amy Winehouse)	Version	The Zutons cover
2007	Mark Ronson	"Apply Some Pressure" (feat. Paul Smith)	Version	Maxïmo Park cover, featuring the band's frontman Paul Smith
2007	Mark Ronson	"Inversion"	Version	
2007	Mark Ronson	"Pretty Green" (feat. Santigold)	Version	The Jam cover
2007	Mark Ronson	"Just" (re-issue, feat. Phantom Planet)	Version	Radiohead cover
2007	Mark Ronson	"Amy" (feat. Kenna)	Version	Ryan Adams cover
2007	Mark Ronson	"The Only One I Know" (feat. Robbie Williams)	Version	The Charlatans cover
2007	Mark Ronson	"Diversion"	Version	
2007	Mark Ronson	"L.S.F. (Lost Souls Forever)" (feat. Kasabian)	Version	Kasabian cover, featuring Kasabian themselves
2007	Mark Ronson	"Outversion"	Version	
2007	Mark Ronson	"Pistol of Fire" (feat. D. Smith)	Version B-sides, Radio 1: Established 1967 and Version (Digital deluxe edition)	Kings of Leon cover
2007	Mark Ronson	"No One Knows" (feat. Domino Kirke)	Version B-sides, Radio 1: Established 1967 and Version (Digital deluxe edition)	Queens of the Stone Age cover
2007	Mark Ronson	"You're All I Need to Get By" (feat. Wale and Tawiah)	Version B-sides, Radio 1: Established 1967 and Version (Digital deluxe edition)	Method Man and Mary J. Blige cover
2008	Rhymefest		Man in the Mirror	Producer
2008	Adele	"Cold Shoulder"	19	Producer, guitar, drums, keyboards, programming
2008	Estelle	"Magnificent" (feat. Kardinal Offishall)	Shine	Producer
2008	Wale	"The Remake of a Remake (All I Need)"	The Mixtape About Nothing	Producer
2008	Wale	"The Chicago Falcon (Remix)"	The Mixtape About Nothing	Producer
2008	Solange Knowles	"6 O'Clock Blues"	Sol-Angel and the Hadley St. Dreams	Co-producer, co-writer
2008	Nas	"Fried Chicken" (feat. Busta Rhymes)	Nas	Producer, co-writer
2008	Kaiser Chiefs		Off with Their Heads	Producer, agogo bells, engineer
2008	Wiley	"Cash in My Pocket"	See Clear Now	Producer
2009	Bebel Gilberto	"The Real Thing"	All in One	Co-producer
2009	Foreigner	"Fool For You Anyway"	Can't Slow Down	Producer
2009	Wale & 9th Wonder	"Pot Of Gold"	Back to the Feature	Producer
2009	Wale & 9th Wonder	"Um Ricka"	Back to the Feature	Producer
2009	Richard Swift		The Atlantic Ocean	Co-producer, synthesizer, engineer
2009	Wale	"Mirrors" (feat. Bun B)	Attention Deficit	Producer, co-composer
2009	Wale	"90210"	Attention Deficit	Producer, co-composer
2009	Wale	"Beautiful Bliss" (feat. Melanie Fiona & J. Cole)	Attention Deficit	Producer, co-composer
2009	Daniel Merriweather	"For Your Money"	Love & War	Producer, engineer
2009	Daniel Merriweather	"Impossible"	Love & War	
2009	Daniel Merriweather	"Change" (feat. Wale)	Love & War	
2009	Daniel Merriweather	"Chainsaw"	Love & War	
2009	Daniel Merriweather	"Cigarettes"	Love & War	
2009	Daniel Merriweather	"Red"	Love & War	
2009	Daniel Merriweather	"Could You"	Love & War	
2009	Daniel Merriweather	"Not Giving Up"	Love & War	
2009	Daniel Merriweather	"Getting Out"	Love & War	
2009	Daniel Merriweather	"Live by Night"	Love & War	
2009	Daniel Merriweather	"You Don't Know What Love Is" (The White Stripes cover)	Love & War	
2009	Daniel Merriweather	"The Children"	Love & War	
2009	Daniel Merriweather	"I Think I'm in Love"	Love & War	
2009	The Rumble Strips		Welcome to the Walk Alone	Producer
2009	Ol' Dirty Bastard	"Lift Ya Skirt (Remix)"	A Son Unique	Producer
2010	The Like		Release Me	Producer
2010	Mark Ronson & The Business Intl.	"Bang Bang Bang" (feat. Q-Tip and MNDR)	Record Collection	Producer, composer, vocals, guitar, bass, beats, keyboards, percussion, engineer
2010	Mark Ronson & The Business Intl.	"Lose It (In the End)" (feat. Ghostface Killah and Alex Greenwald)	Record Collection	Producer, composer, vocals, guitar, bass, beats, keyboards, percussion, engineer
2010	Mark Ronson & The Business Intl.	"The Bike Song" (feat. Kyle Falconer and Spank Rock)	Record Collection	Producer, composer, vocals, guitar, bass, beats, keyboards, percussion, engineer
2010	Mark Ronson & The Business Intl.	"Somebody to Love Me" (feat. Boy George and Andrew Wyatt)	Record Collection	Producer, composer, vocals, guitar, bass, beats, keyboards, percussion, engineer
2010	Mark Ronson & The Business Intl.	"You Gave Me Nothing" (feat. Rose Elinor Dougall and Andrew Wyatt)	Record Collection	Producer, composer, vocals, guitar, bass, beats, keyboards, percussion, engineer
2010	Mark Ronson & The Business Intl.	"The Colour of Crumar"	Record Collection	Producer, composer, vocals, guitar, bass, beats, keyboards, percussion, engineer
2010	Mark Ronson & The Business Intl.	"Glass Mountain Trust" (feat. D'Angelo)	Record Collection	Producer, composer, vocals, guitar, bass, beats, keyboards, percussion, engineer
2010	Mark Ronson & The Business Intl.	"Circuit Breaker"	Record Collection	Producer, composer, vocals, guitar, bass, beats, keyboards, percussion, engineer
2010	Mark Ronson & The Business Intl.	"Introducing the Business" (feat. Pill and London Gay Men's Chorus)	Record Collection	Producer, composer, vocals, guitar, bass, beats, keyboards, percussion, engineer
2010	Mark Ronson & The Business Intl.	"Record Collection" (feat. Simon Le Bon and Wiley)	Record Collection	Producer, composer, vocals, guitar, bass, beats, keyboards, percussion, engineer
2010	Mark Ronson & The Business Intl.	"Selector"	Record Collection	Producer, composer, vocals, guitar, bass, beats, keyboards, percussion, engineer
2010	Mark Ronson & The Business Intl.	"Hey Boy" (feat. Rose Elinor Dougall and Theophilus London)	Record Collection	Producer, composer, vocals, guitar, bass, beats, keyboards, percussion, engineer
2010	Mark Ronson & The Business Intl.	"Missing Words"	Record Collection	Producer, composer, vocals, guitar, bass, beats, keyboards, percussion, engineer
2010	Mark Ronson & The Business Intl.	"The Night Last Night" (feat. Rose Elinor Dougall and Alex Greenwald)	Record Collection	Producer, composer, vocals, guitar, bass, beats, keyboards, percussion, engineer
2010	Mark Ronson & The Business Intl.	"Sound of Plastic" (feat. Nick Rhodes, Rose Elinor Dougall, Spank Rock, Jamie Reynolds, and Anthony Rossomando)	Record Collection (Deluxe)	Producer, composer, vocals, guitar, bass, beats, keyboards, percussion, engineer
2010	Quincy Jones	"It's My Party"	Q Soul Bossa Nostra	Producer
2010	Duran Duran	"All You Need Is Now"	All You Need Is Now	Producer
2010	Duran Duran	"Blame the Machines"	All You Need Is Now	Producer
2010	Duran Duran	"Being Followed"	All You Need Is Now	Producer
2010	Duran Duran	"Leave a Light On"	All You Need Is Now	Producer
2010	Duran Duran	"Safe (In the Heat of the Moment)" (feat. Ana Matronic)	All You Need Is Now	Producer
2010	Duran Duran	"Girl Panic!"	All You Need Is Now	Producer
2010	Duran Duran	"A Diamond in the Mind"	All You Need Is Now	Producer
2010	Duran Duran	"The Man Who Stole a Leopard" (featuring Kelis)	All You Need Is Now	Producer
2010	Duran Duran	"Other People's Lives"	All You Need Is Now	Producer
2010	Duran Duran	"Mediterranea"	All You Need Is Now	Producer
2010	Duran Duran	"Too Bad You're So Beautiful"	All You Need Is Now	Producer
2010	Duran Duran	"Runway Runaway"	All You Need Is Now	Producer
2010	Duran Duran	"Return to Now"	All You Need Is Now	Producer
2010	Duran Duran	"Before the Rain"	All You Need Is Now	Producer
2010	Duran Duran	"Networker Nation"	All You Need Is Now (Deluxe)	Producer
2010	Duran Duran	"This Lost Weekend"	All You Need Is Now (Deluxe)	Producer
2010	Duran Duran	"Too Close to the Sun"	All You Need Is Now (Deluxe)	Producer
2010	Duran Duran	"Early Summer Nerves"	All You Need Is Now (Deluxe)	Producer
2011	Black Lips		Arabia Mountain	Producer
2011	Amy Winehouse	"Will You Still Love Me Tomorrow"	Lioness: Hidden Treasures	Producer
2011	Amy Winehouse	"Valerie ('68 version)"	Lioness: Hidden Treasures	
2011	Arthur Orchestra	"A Harmless Game Of Dress Up"	Arthur: Original Motion Picture; Soundtrack	
2011	Daniel Merriweather	"A Little Bit Better"	Arthur: Original Motion Picture; Soundtrack	
2011	Daniel Merriweather	"Dazed"	Arthur: Original Motion Picture; Soundtrack	
2011	Daniel Merriweather	"Can't Buy You"	Arthur: Original Motion Picture; Soundtrack	
2012	Rufus Wainwright	"Out of the Game"	Out of the Game	Producer, bass, drum programming
2012	Rufus Wainwright	"Jericho"	Out of the Game	Producer, bass, drum programming
2012	Rufus Wainwright	"Rashida"	Out of the Game	Producer, bass, drum programming
2012	Rufus Wainwright	"Barbara"	Out of the Game	Producer, bass, drum programming
2012	Rufus Wainwright	"Welcome to the Ball"	Out of the Game	Producer, bass, drum programming
2012	Rufus Wainwright	"Montauk"	Out of the Game	Producer, bass, drum programming
2012	Rufus Wainwright	"Bitter Tears"	Out of the Game	Producer, bass, drum programming
2012	Rufus Wainwright	"Respectable Dive"	Out of the Game	Producer, bass, drum programming
2012	Rufus Wainwright	"Perfect Man"	Out of the Game	Producer, bass, drum programming
2012	Rufus Wainwright	"Sometimes You Need"	Out of the Game	Producer, bass, drum programming
2012	Rufus Wainwright	"Song of You"	Out of the Game	Producer, bass, drum programming
2012	Rufus Wainwright	"Candles"	Out of the Game	Producer, bass, drum programming
2012	Rufus Wainwright	"WWIII"	Out of the Game	Producer, bass, drum programming
2012	Bruno Mars	"Locked Out of Heaven"	Unorthodox Jukebox	Producer, DJ, recording
2012	Bruno Mars	"Gorilla"	Unorthodox Jukebox	Producer, beats, DJ, recording
2012	Bruno Mars	"Moonshine"	Unorthodox Jukebox	Producer, co-writer, guitar, bass, beats
2013	Paul McCartney	"Alligator"	New	Producer
2013	Paul McCartney	"New"	New	Producer
2014	The Ghost of a Saber Tooth Tiger		Midnight Sun	Producer, bass
2015	Emile Haynie		We Fall	Bass
2015	Mark Ronson	"Uptown's First Finale" (feat. Stevie Wonder and Andrew Wyatt)	Uptown Special	Producer, guitar, bass, drums, keyboards, percussion, programming
2015	Mark Ronson	"Summer Breaking" (feat. Kevin Parker)	Uptown Special	Producer, guitar, bass, drums, keyboards, percussion, programming
2015	Mark Ronson	"Feel Right" (feat. Mystikal)	Uptown Special	Producer, guitar, bass, drums, keyboards, percussion, programming
2015	Mark Ronson	"Uptown Funk" (feat. Bruno Mars)	Uptown Special	Producer, guitar, bass, drums, keyboards, percussion, programming
2015	Mark Ronson	"I Can't Lose" (feat. Keyone Starr)	Uptown Special	Producer, guitar, bass, drums, keyboards, percussion, programming
2015	Mark Ronson	"Daffodils" (feat. Kevin Parker)	Uptown Special	Producer, guitar, bass, drums, keyboards, percussion, programming
2015	Mark Ronson	"Crack in the Pearl" (feat. Andrew Wyatt)	Uptown Special	Producer, guitar, bass, drums, keyboards, percussion, programming
2015	Mark Ronson	"In Case of Fire" (feat. Jeff Bhasker)	Uptown Special	Producer, guitar, bass, drums, keyboards, percussion, programming
2015	Mark Ronson	"Leaving Los Feliz" (feat. Kevin Parker)	Uptown Special	Producer, guitar, bass, drums, keyboards, percussion, programming
2015	Mark Ronson	"Heavy and Rolling" (feat. Andrew Wyatt)	Uptown Special	Producer, guitar, bass, drums, keyboards, percussion, programming
2015	Mark Ronson	"Crack in the Pearl Pt. II" (feat. Stevie Wonder and Jeff Bhasker)	Uptown Special	Producer, guitar, bass, drums, keyboards, percussion, programming
2015	Elle King	"Last Damn Night"	Love Stuff	Co-writer, guitar, bass
2015	Duran Duran	"Pressure Off"	Paper Gods	Producer, co-writer
2015	Duran Duran	"Only in Dreams"	Paper Gods	Producer, co-writer
2015	Action Bronson	"Brand New Car"	Mr. Wonderful	Producer, co-writer, guitar, bass, drums, keyboards, turntables, programming
2015	Action Bronson	"Baby Blue" (feat. Chance the Rapper)	Mr. Wonderful	Producer, co-writer, guitar, bass, drums, keyboards, turntables, programming
2015	Mark Ronson & Geoff Zanelli	Score and soundtrack	Mortdecai (Original Motion; Picture Soundtrack)	Co-composer
2015	ASAP Rocky	"Everyday"	At. Long. Last. ASAP	Producer, co-writer, bass, keyboards, drum programming, engineering
2015	CeeLo Green	"Mother May I"	Heart Blanche	Producer, co-writer
2015	Adele	"Lay Me Down"	25	Producer, synthesizers
2016	Scarlett Johansson	"Trust in Me"	The Jungle Book (Original; Motion Picture Soundtrack)	Producer
2016	Lady Gaga	"Diamond Heart"	Joanne	Producer, co-writer, guitar, bass, keyboards, synthesizers
2016	Lady Gaga	"A-Yo"	Joanne	Producer, co-writer, guitar, bass, keyboards, synthesizers
2016	Lady Gaga	"Joanne"	Joanne	Producer, co-writer, guitar, bass, keyboards, synthesizers
2016	Lady Gaga	"John Wayne"	Joanne	Producer, co-writer, guitar, bass, keyboards, synthesizers
2016	Lady Gaga	"Dancin' In Circles"	Joanne	Producer, co-writer, guitar, bass, keyboards, synthesizers
2016	Lady Gaga	"Perfect Illusion"	Joanne	Producer, co-writer, guitar, bass, keyboards, synthesizers
2016	Lady Gaga	"Million Reasons"	Joanne	Producer, co-writer, guitar, bass, keyboards, synthesizers
2016	Lady Gaga	"Sinner's Prayer"	Joanne	Producer, co-writer, guitar, bass, keyboards, synthesizers
2016	Lady Gaga	"Come To Mama"	Joanne	Producer, co-writer, guitar, bass, keyboards, synthesizers
2016	Lady Gaga	"Hey Girl" (feat. Florence Welch)	Joanne	Producer, co-writer, guitar, bass, keyboards, synthesizers
2016	Lady Gaga	"Angel Down"	Joanne	Producer, co-writer, guitar, bass, keyboards, synthesizers
2016	Lady Gaga	"Grigio Girls"	Joanne	Producer, co-writer, guitar, bass, keyboards, synthesizers
2016	Lady Gaga	"Just Another Day"	Joanne	Producer, co-writer, guitar, bass, keyboards, synthesizers
2016	Action Bronson with Mark Ronson and Dan Auerbach	"Standing in the Rain"	Suicide Squad: The Album	Producer, co-writer, guitar, keyboards, background vocals
2016	Passion Pit, Mark Ronson, and A$AP Ferg	"Get Ghost"	Ghostbusters (Original Motion; Picture Soundtrack)	Producer, co-writer
2017	Queens of the Stone Age	"Feet Don't Fail Me"	Villains	
2017	Queens of the Stone Age	"The Way You Used to Do"	Villains	Producer
2017	Queens of the Stone Age	"Domesticated Animals"	Villains	Producer
2017	Queens of the Stone Age	"Fortress"	Villains	Producer
2017	Queens of the Stone Age	"Head Like a Haunted House"	Villains	Producer
2017	Queens of the Stone Age	"Un-Reborn Again"	Villains	Producer
2017	Queens of the Stone Age	"Hideaway"	Villains	Producer
2017	Queens of the Stone Age	"The Evil Has Landed"	Villains	Producer
2017	Queens of the Stone Age	"Villains of Circumstance"	Villains	Producer
2017	Dua Lipa	"IDGAF"	Dua Lipa	Instrumentation, programming
2018	Lily Allen	"Family Man"	No Shame	
2018	Lily Allen	"My One"	No Shame	
2018	Father John Misty	"Disappointing Diamonds Are the Rarest of Them All"	God's Favorite Customer	Bass credit only
2018	Miguel	"Vote"	Crazy Rich Asians	
2018	MC Paul Barman	"(((commandments)))"	(((echo chamber)))	Recording credit only
2018	MC Paul Barman	"(((happy holidays)))"	(((echo chamber)))	Producer
2019	Vampire Weekend	"This Life"	Father of the Bride	Co-writer
2019	Miley Cyrus	"The Most"	She Is Coming	Co-producer and co-writer
2019	Mark Ronson	"Late Night Prelude"	Late Night Feelings	
2019	Mark Ronson	"Late Night Feelings" (feat. Lykke Li)	Late Night Feelings	
2019	Mark Ronson	"Find U Again" (feat. Camila Cabello)	Late Night Feelings	
2019	Mark Ronson	"Piece of Us" (feat. King Princess)	Late Night Feelings	
2019	Mark Ronson	"Knock Knock Knock" (feat. Yebba)	Late Night Feelings	
2019	Mark Ronson	"Don't Leave Me Lonely" (feat. YEBBA)	Late Night Feelings	
2019	Mark Ronson	"When U Went Away" (feat. YEBBA)	Late Night Feelings	
2019	Mark Ronson	"Truth" (feat. Alicia Keys & The Last Artful, Dodgr)	Late Night Feelings	
2019	Mark Ronson	"Nothing Breaks Like a Heart" (feat. Miley Cyrus)	Late Night Feelings	
2019	Mark Ronson	"True Blue" (feat. Angel Olsen)	Late Night Feelings	
2019	Mark Ronson	"Why Hide" (feat. Diana Gordon)	Late Night Feelings	
2019	Mark Ronson	"2 AM" (feat. Lykke Li)	Late Night Feelings	
2019	Mark Ronson	"Spinning" (feat. Ilsey)	Late Night Feelings	
2020	Alicia Keys	"Authors of Forever"	Alicia	Co-producer
2021	Duran Duran	"Wing"	Future Past	Guitars, co-writer
2023	Mark Ronson, Andrew Wyatt	Barbie original motion picture soundtrack	Barbie the Album	Original score composer, replaced Alexandre Desplat
2023	Dua Lipa	"Dance the Night"	Barbie the Album	Co-writer, co-producer
2023	Sam Smith	"Man I Am"	Barbie the Album	Co-writer, co-producer
2023	Ryan Gosling	"I'm Just Ken"	Barbie the Album	Co-writer, co-producer
2023	Billie Eilish	"What Was I Made For?"	Barbie the Album	Co-producer
2024	Kelly Clarkson	"You For Christmas"	When Christmas Comes Around... Again	Co-writer, producer
2025	Daniel Merriweather	"For Winter"	New Sincerity	Producer
2026	Mark Ronson, Andrew Wyatt	Narnia: The Magician's Nephew original motion picture soundtrack	Narnia: The Magician's Nephew original motion picture soundtrack	Original score composer

=== Other singles ===
- 1997: Posse-O – "It's Up to You..."*
- 1998: Powerule – "Heatin' Up"*
- 1998: Powerule – "Rhymes to Bust" / "It's Your Right"*
- 2002: J-Live – "School's In"*
- 2004: Daniel Merriweather – "City Rules"*
- 2004: Daniel Merriweather – "She's Got Me"*
- 2005: Rhymefest – "These Days"*
- 2005: Rhymefest – "Brand New"*
- 2007: Candie Payne – "One More Chance"*
- 2007: Bob Dylan – "Most Likely You Go Your Way (And I'll Go Mine) (Mark Ronson Re-version)"*
- 2007: Maroon 5 featuring Mary J. Blige – "Wake Up Call (Mark Ronson Remix)"*
- 2008: Leon Jean-Marie – "Bed of Nails"*
- 2008: Kaiser Chiefs – "Never Miss a Beat"*
- 2008: Wiley – "Cash in My Pocket"*
- 2008: Kaiser Chiefs – "Good Days Bad Days"*
- 2009: Daniel Merriweather – "Change"*
- 2009: Daniel Merriweather – "Red"*
- 2009: Daniel Merriweather – "Impossible"
- 2012: Rufus Wainwright – "Out of the Game"*
- 2012: Rufus Wainwright – "Jericho"*
- 2013: Giggs – "(Is It Gangsta?) Yes Yes Yes"*
- 2015: Duran Duran featuring Janelle Monáe and Nile Rodgers – "Pressure Off"*
- 2016: Various Artists – "Hands"*
- 2018: Michael Jackson - "Diamonds Are Invincible"* (Mash-Up)
- 2018: Silk City - "Electricity"* featuring Dua Lipa, Diplo and Mark Ronson
- 2018: Lady Gaga and Bradley Cooper – "Shallow"*
- 2020: Troye Sivan featuring Kacey Musgraves and Mark Ronson - "Easy"*
- 2023: Dua Lipa - "Dance the Night"*

== Awards and nominations ==
In 2026, Ronson was honoured with the Outstanding Contribution to Music award at the BRIT Awards held at the Co-op Live arena in Manchester. The award recognised his influential and enduring impact on popular music as both a producer and performer, spanning collaborations with artists such as Amy Winehouse, Lady Gaga, Dua Lipa, and Bruno Mars. During the ceremony, Ronson paid tribute to the late Amy Winehouse, reflecting on their work together on Back to Black, and performed a career-spanning medley featuring contributions from collaborators including Ghostface Killah and Dua Lipa.

== See also ==
- List of British Grammy winners and nominees
