= Pill (rapper) =

American rapper (born 1983)

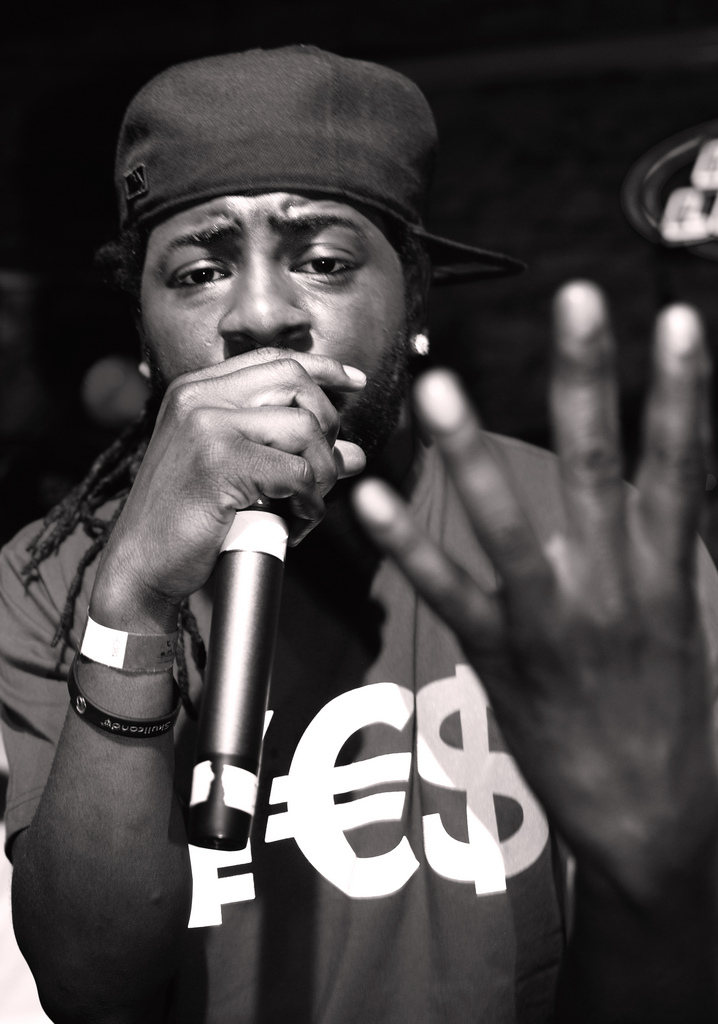
- Pill at SXSW in 2010

Background information
- Born: Tyrone Gregory Rivers; 27 November 1983 (age 42); Atlanta, Georgia, U.S.
- Genres: Hip-hop
- Occupation: Rapper
- Years active: 2009–present
- Labels: MMG; D5M; Asylum; Warner Bros.
- Website: pill4180.com

Tyrone Gregory Rivers, better known by his stage name Pill, is an American rapper from Atlanta, Georgia.

== Musical career ==
In early 2009, Pill's first mixtape 4180: The Prescription, and his first single "Trap Goin' Ham" was released. In September 2009, Pill was featured in The Source's Unsigned Hype section. The mixtape received praise from fellow Atlanta rapper André 3000. Later that year he was featured in XXL's Show & Prove section. He also appeared on Killer Mike's Underground Atlanta compilation, on the tracks "Bunkin'" and "Grind Time." Pill's second mixtape 4075: The Refill and his second single off the mixtape "Glass" was released.

In 2010, he was featured on the cover of XXL as part of the XXL Freshman 10 line-up, with Donnis, Nipsey Hussle, Jay Rock, J. Cole, OJ da Juiceman and more. In June 2010, he released his third mixtape and first Gangsta Grillz mixtape 1140: The Overdose which was hosted by DJ Drama. He later appeared on fellow XXL Freshman Freddie Gibbs's EP Str8 Killa No Filla on the track "Do Wrong." He was also featured on "Introducing the Business" by Mark Ronson, which featured on Ronson's album Record Collection.

Maybach Music Group, the hip-hop imprint founded by Rick Ross, has announced a partnership with Warner Bros. Records. Maybach also announced its latest signee, Atlanta rapper Pill, on 22 February 2011.

Recently Pill was featured on "Ya Killin Me", a song off of Tech N9ne's new All 6's and 7's album, which appeared as a bonus track.

On 3 January 2012, Pill announced that he was leaving Maybach Music Group Imprint and Warner Bros. Records via his Twitter account.

After a six-year hiatus, Pill released a single "Back Right" on 15 February 2018, produced by 808 Mafia.

== Discography ==
=== Mixtapes ===
- 4180: The Prescription (2009)
- 4075: The Refill (2009)
- 1140: The Overdose (2010)
- The Diagnosis (2011)
- The Epidemic (2012)
