= London Gay Men's Chorus =

British gay choir

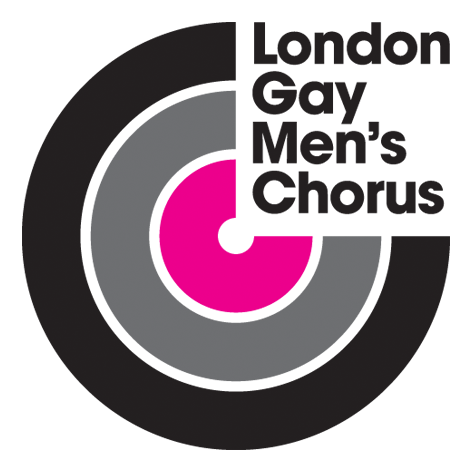
- London Gay Men's Chorus logo

Background information
- Origin: London, England
- Genres: 20th century, baroque, choral, classical, folk, gospel, jazz, popular, show tunes,
- Occupation: Men's Choir
- Instrument: 300 voices
- Years active: 1991–present
- Members: Chair; Martin Brophy MBE; Artistic Director; Simon Sharp; Assistant Musical Director; Chris Pethers; Principal Accompanist; Laurie Denman
- Website: www.lgmc.org.uk

London Gay Men's Chorus is a gay choir that was founded in 1991 by a group of nine gay men. The group now has around 200 singing members at any one time and over 300 members in total.

== Introduction ==
With a widely varying repertoire from classical music to folk, jazz, pop, R&B or show tunes, and often including choreography, the Chorus's Vision is 'Everyone Brought Together Through Song'. The LGMC's Mission is to 'Create, Enable and Connect Confident Voices across Communities with fun, hope, love, joy and fearless allyship', while the values which guide the charity are "all-in", "harmony", "community" and "transformation". The Chorus operates an open access policy, allowing anyone to join. New members are simply voice-tested and not auditioned when they join the group.

The Chorus often rehearses at Cecil Sharp House, Camden Town and has offices at Capital House in London, England.

== Structure ==
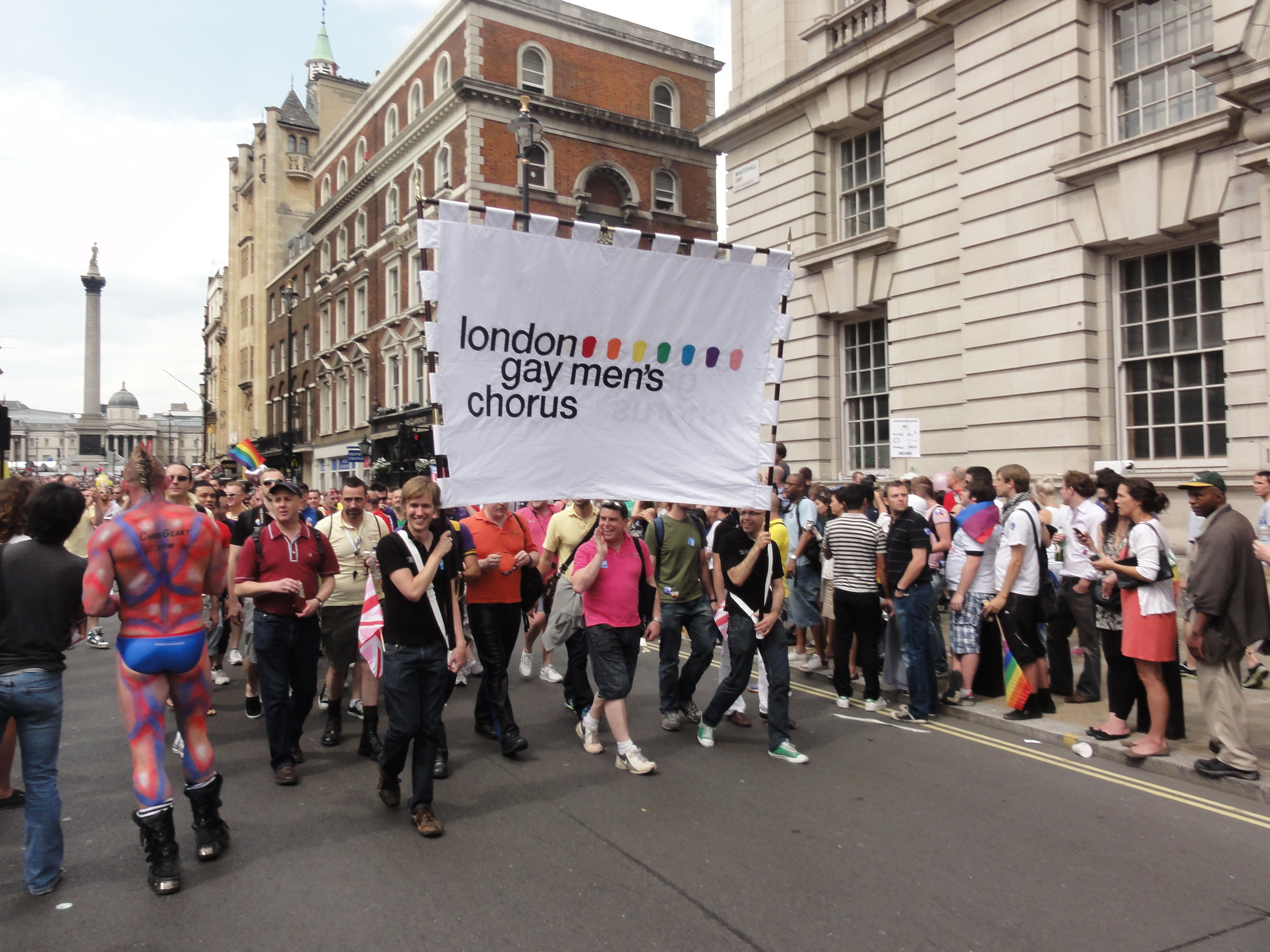
London Gay Men's Chorus members marching in Pride London 2011

With approximately 200 voices, the London Gay Men's Chorus has four singing sections, bass, baritone, first tenor and second tenor. Each section is divided between upper and lower voices supported by a music support team drawn from the ranks. Semitones are non-singing members who help support the chorus, including performing Front of House activities during a concert.

A group of auditioned members constitute the 'ensemble' (LGMCe), a small group which works as an ambassadorial and fundraising entity and performs at corporate events, civil partnership and wedding ceremonies.

In August 2024, the Chorus converted from being a charitable company limited by guarantee to a Charitable Incorporated Organisation (CIO) (Reg. No. 1092827). It is governed by a board of 13 trustees comprising seven members and six external trustees.

Revenue is drawn from membership subscriptions, ticket and merchandise sales, donations, and performance fees.

The Chorus has had a number of commercial sponsors, both monetary donors and providers of pro bono professional services, including the former pioneering gay website Queer Company, design firm Marsh and Malone who developed a new corporate identity in 2005–6, and fundraising consultants Brakeley. The Chorus also enjoyed a commercial relationship with Selfridges, and has sung carols in the Oxford Street store during the Christmas season for five years (between 2004 and 2008). Further relationships with Baker McKenzie and ARUP have more recently been established.

== Historic overview ==
Original logo of the London Gay Men's Chorus

After humble beginnings in 1991 at Angel Underground station (where the station had to be closed due to the crowd that had gathered), the Chorus has performed around the United Kingdom and toured overseas in the United States, France, Italy, Canada, Spain, Poland, Ireland, the Czech Republic and Australia and sung with the Helsinki Gay Men's Chorus in the summer of 2009.

The chorus has made many TV appearances and radio broadcasts including Top of the Pops, So Graham Norton, Loose Ends, Ruby Wax Christmas special, London Tonight, the Paul Ross weekend breakfast show on LBC, and Comic Relief, and has sung and performed with stars including Sir Elton John, The Human League, Heather Small, Damien Hirst, Simon Callow, Alison Jiear, Jocelyn Brown, Toyah Willcox, k.d. lang, Rula Lenska, Sandi Toksvig, Dame Cleo Laine, Mark Ronson and The Pet Shop Boys.

Over the years the Chorus has raised thousands of pounds for charity (the Food Chain, the Royal Marsden Hospital, Crusaid, the RNIB, Changing Attitude, [The National Autistic Society], the Terrence Higgins Trust, the Orchid Cancer Appeal, Cara and others), and sung everywhere from the tube station of its beginnings to pubs and street corners, XXL, Heaven, Trafalgar Square, the Royal Festival Hall and Queen Elizabeth Hall, the Sydney Opera House and the Sydney Football Stadium, the Millennium Dome in the presence of HM The Queen, La Cigale in Paris, The Kennedy Center in Washington, D.C., the National Concert Hall in Dublin, the Gianni Agnelli Auditorium in Turin, the London Coliseum (for the centenary of the building), the Palau de la Música Catalana in Barcelona, the Congress Hall in Warsaw, Poland and the Royal Albert Hall. Most recently it has once again raised funds for the Terrence Higgins Trust, who it partnered with back in 1991 when it was founded, as part of both their 30th and 40th anniversary celebrations.

== Recent history ==
=== 2024 ===
The Chorus returned to Alexandra Palace Theatre to showcase a celebration of global pride in its production of Queer Carnival - a show performed in multiple languages and in partnership with the Kaleidoscope Trust

=== 2023 ===
Returning to Cadogan Hall, the LGMC presented two concerts - 'Proud' in June followed by 'A Winter's Tale' hosted by Sandi Toksvig in November. This was followed up with a Christmas show at the Clapham Grand on 22 & 23 December, aptly titled, 'It's Christmas!'. The summer concert helped to raise awareness and funds for Parkinson's UK and the winter concerts for Stonewall Housing. The Chorus also traveled to Florence & Bologna, Italy to participate in Various Voices 2024, finishing off the year with a surprise appearance on Patron Hannah Waddingham's Apple TV Special 'Hannah Waddingham - Home for Christmas' filmed at the London Coliseum.

=== 2022 ===
In 2022 the LGMC marked the incredible contribution of Stephen Sondheim to music and theatre through its 'Sondheim Songtime' performances at Cadogan Hall, followed by a return of the Halloween Ball at the Alexandra Palace Theatre - a reboot of 2013's Ball at the Hackney Empire.

=== 2021 ===
This year saw its triumphant return to stage with performances of 'Perfect Day' at Cadogan Hall, celebrating its return to stage, and its 'Big Birthday Bash' performance at the Clapham Grand, marking the official 30th birthday.

=== 2020 ===
Due to the global COVID-19 pandemic live, in-person performances were paused but member-focussed activities continued, with online performances also held throughout one of the most challenging year in the LGMC's history.

=== 2019 ===
On Saturday 15 June, in a show celebrating the iconic sound of Motown, the Chorus presented Hitsville – a concert penned by some of the all-time greats of popular music. The show took place again at London's Troxy. At the show, the Nigerian gay-rights activist Bisi Alimi was announced as the chorus' newest patron.

For the Christmas season, the chorus tackled the idea of 'home'. Finding Home took audiences through a moving, uplifting and thoroughly entertaining show at Cadogan Hall.

=== 2018 ===
On 15 June, the LGMC performed the first of two Summer concerts at Cadogan Hall, Polyphonica. The chorus travelled to Munich in May 2018 as part of the Various Voices LGBT chorus festival where they sang repertoire from the show along with some other favourites, including a duet with Conchita Wurst on Rise Like A Phoenix.

On 5 September, the Chorus performed at the GQ Men of the Year Awards at Tate Modern and introduced Charles, Prince of Wales to the stage as he accepted The Editor's Lifetime Achievement Award For Services To Philanthropy.

On 20 December, the LGMC performed the first of four Christmas shows at the Clapham Grand, Oom-Pah-Pah! which took its inspiration from the Victorian music hall.

=== 2017 ===
In January 2017, the Chorus started rehearsing for their next show, Agitpop, at Cadogan Hall. The chorus also took the show to New York City in May 2017 where they performed at the city's Skirball Cultural Center alongside the New York City Gay Men's Chorus before decamping to Chicago to perform with the Chicago Gay Men's Chorus. The chorus also performed AgitPop at the Snape Festival in Snape Maltings in August.

During this season, the chorus also collaborated with the cast of The Lion King to sing a version of "Circle of Life" to coincide with Pride in London.

In December, the Chorus presented Tinseltown, a tribute to Hollywood featuring Rachel Tucker and Dylan Turner.

On 6 May, members of the LGMC performed at the wedding of Tom Daley and Dustin Lance Black.

=== 2016 ===
In 2016, the Chorus celebrated its 25th anniversary and Silver Jubilee, with its first show of the year at Cadogan Hall for 'History' a retrospective of both the Chorus' own history and key events since it formed in 1991.

In the wake of the Orlando nightclub shooting, the LGMC attended a vigil on London's Old Compton Street, singing Simon and Garfunkel's Bridge Over Troubled Water to the waiting crowd. Due to the public reaction, the Chorus released the song as a single on Friday 24 June, with all profits going to the Orlando victims fund and GALOP UK, a Uk-based charity combating hate crime.

The Chorus also undertook a regional tour of the UK, travelling to Brighton in August to sing with the Brighton Gay Men's Chorus for Brighton Pride, and singing with Gay Abandon and The Deep C Divas in Leeds in October. They performed at Newcastle the next day. In October, the Chorus also returned to Union Chapel to take part once again in the Robert Grace Trust fundraiser.

On 27 November, the Chorus performed a special show, UGotMale at the Royal Festival Hall. The show celebrated the Silver Jubilee and also closed the Southbank Centre's Being a Man festival. For this special show, the Chorus was joined by patron Hannah Waddingham and Hannah Peddley, as well as members of the Orion Symphony Orchestra and the London Gay Big Band.

To finish the year, the Chorus performed at Angel and Tottenham Court Road tube stations on 1 December to celebrate the Jubilee and commemorate World AIDS Day. The LGMC Ensemble also performed a Christmas show in December (Homo Alone: A Christmas Story) at the Lost Theatre, and the Chorus released XXV - celebrating 25 years (see below).

=== 2015 ===
This year's performances focussed on the theme of Love, for summer at Cadogan Hall; the winter then played host to the Big Gay Swing at the Roundhouse.

=== 2014 ===
2014 saw a collaboration with the New York City Gay Men's Chorus with 'You Say Tomato' at the Queen Elizabeth Hall, Southbank Centre, as well as 'We Are London' at Union Chapel as well as a traditional Christmas concert at Cadogan Hall.

=== 2013 ===
The Chorus performed an unforgettable set of Halloween performances at the Hackney Empire - a move away from its more traditional Christmas themed performances in the second half of the year.

=== 2012 ===
In February, the Chorus sang at 10 Downing Street in the presence of Prime Minister David Cameron for an event against homophobia in sport.

The Chorus performed its 21st anniversary show, A Band of Brothers, at the Royal Festival Hall (for the first time) on 6 May 2012 in support of the Kaleidoscope Trust with participation of the Southbank Centre's Voicelab and London school children. The compere for the show was Paul Gambaccini. They also performed the show at the Grand Opera House in Belfast on 20 May.

The repertoire for this show includes Madonna, Lady Gaga, Richard Wagner, Lily Allen, The Smiths and a new commission with music by Conor Mitchell and book by Mark Ravenhill entitled Shadow Time. The piece explores the evolution of mentalities in respect of homosexuality in the lifetime of the Chorus.

As part of an outreach project the Chorus worked with two London schools (Stoke Newington School, Riverside School). The pupils involved in this (some of them with special needs) took part in the show at the Royal Festival Hall. A short film about the project, introduced by Jon Snow, was produced by the Media Trust and shown on the Community Channel as part of the Untold Stories series.

The Chorus also performed at Southwark Cathedral on 6 July as part of World Pride while members took part in various events linked to the Olympic and Paralympic Games.

Members of the Chorus also feature in episode 5 of a new BBC Three sitcom. The show, Dead Boss, is written by Sharon Horgan and features Jennifer Saunders, Caroline Quentin and Susan Calman. Episode 5 also features Tony Blackburn and Carl Barât. The show aired in June and July.

=== 2011 ===
The Chorus performed the summer show, Sound: An Aural Adventure on 24 and 25 June at the Union Chapel. Guests performers included members of the London Bulgarian Choir. The repertoire included a Bollywood medley and a 16-part version of Björk's Triumph of the Heart, complete with beatboxing.

The Christmas show, Make Mine a Snowball, was performed on 16 and 17 December to a sold-out crowd at Cadogan Hall.

=== 2010 ===
The summer show, The Seven Deadly Sins was performed at the Camden Roundhouse on 25 & 26 June 2010. The Chorus performed in the Congress Hall in Warsaw, Poland on 16 July 2010 and took part in the Europride 2010 parade. Members of the Chorus appeared on the (originally eponymous) track "Introducing The Business" in Mark Ronson's album Record Collection.

The Christmas show Make Your Own Kind of Christmas was performed on 10–11 December 2010 at the Cadogan Hall with its trademark mix of fabulous pop hits and stunning classical pieces, all laced with a generous splash of festive spirit.

It was a work inspired by how some gay men's live the Christmas celebration, with an eclectic soundtrack including music by Kurt Weill, the Smiths, Handel, Kylie Minogue and Carly Simon.

A share of the proceeds from these concerts supported the Samaritans UK.

=== 2009 ===
Members of the Chorus spearheaded the bid for London to host the European choir festival Various Voices 2009, which was awarded the Inspire Mark by the organisers of the London 2012 Olympics. The festival took place at the Southbank Centre in May 2009 in collaboration with the 2 other London LGBT choirs (The Pink Singers and Diversity), and with the support of Visit London and the Greater London Authority.

The Chorus visited Helsinki in June and performed with Out and Loud the Finnish gay male voice choir in a one night concert in Helsinki. The LGMC also marched in Helsinki gay pride and sang on the main stage.

The Chorus's repertoire for that season brought together a selection of songs about London. The show at the Shaw Theatre on 16 July was called Songs of London.

On 30 October the Chorus together with members of the LGBT choirs of London, Brighton and Hove, Birmingham and Reading as well as the London Gay Symphonic Wind took part in a vigil against hate crime in Trafalgar Square in memory of Ian Baynham who died after a homophobic attack near the Square. The event gathered several thousand people and was hosted by Sandi Toksvig. It featured contributions by Richard Barnes (Deputy Mayor of London), Chris Bryant MP (Minister for Europe) and Maria Eagle MP (Minister of State for Equalities and twin of the only out lesbian MP), Stephen K Amos and Sue Perkins.

The Chorus's winter performances, which included panto elements and titled Singderella took place at the Cadogan Hall on 4 and 5 December. The performances were in support of Everyman, Marie Curie Cancer Care and St John's Hospice.

The Chorus was also invited to be the lead choir at the annual GLA Carol Service at Southwark Cathedral on 15 December.

The Chorus appeared as one of the many guests of Sandi Toksvig's Christmas Cracker series of shows at The Royal Festival Hall. The performance on 22 December 2009 was broadcast live on Sky Arts 1.

=== 2008 ===
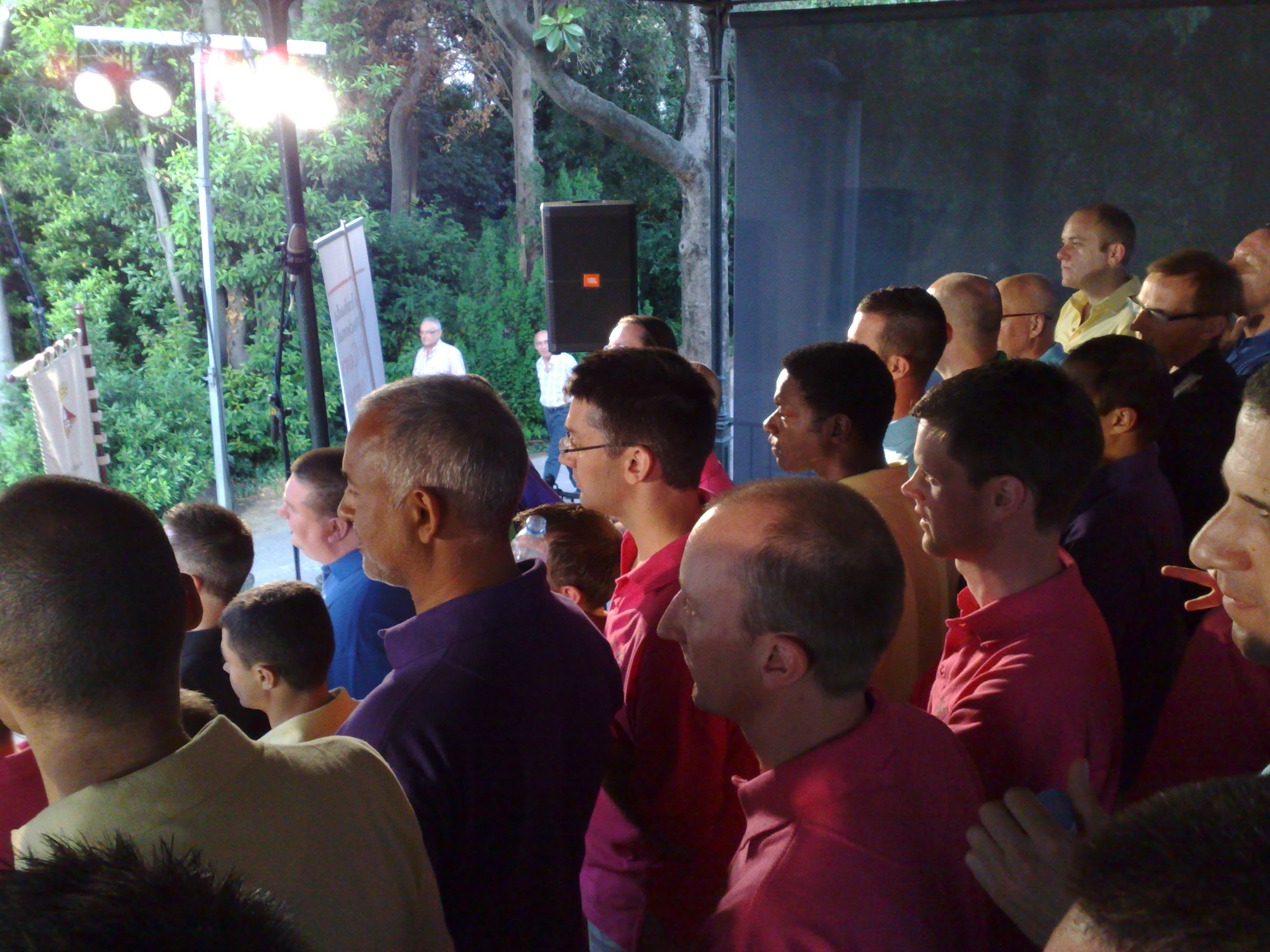
The LGMC during its performance at Castellar del Vallès

In July, the Chorus performed a selection of songs based on the work of William Blake, Songs of Innocence and Experience at the Cadogan Hall on 4 and 5 July.

Later in the month, the Chorus was invited to take part in the second edition of the Trobada Internacional de Cors d'Homes in Catalonia (Spain). The Chorus, one of the five male voice choirs taking part, performed at Palau de la Música Catalana, Barcelona with the other choirs, in La Garriga with the Societat Coral L'Aliança, Castellar del Vallès with the Coral Sant Josep, and in Vila-Seca.

The Christmas show, For Christmas' Sake, took place at the Cadogan Hall and was in support of the National Autistic Society.

=== 2007 ===
On 26 and 27 May, the Chorus made its first visit to Scotland with performances at the Usher Hall in Edinburgh and the Strathclyde Suite at the Royal Concert Hall, Glasgow. They were performing with one of Scotland's LGBT choirs, Loud & Proud. The show, directed by Julian Woolford, was titled Bad Boys and compiled rock anthems with classical/operatic pieces. It also featured the premiere of My Friends, a song by Julian Woolford and Richard John, which was performed by Far From Kansas. It is a tribute to those who died in the 1980s during the AIDS crisis. There were also two sold-out performances at the Cadogan Hall in London on 20 and 21 July.

At the end of the summer season, Charles Beale, the musical director left to become musical director of the New York City Gay Men's Chorus. Andrea Brown also had to leave to Chorus after having been offered a teaching job at Morley College (south London).

On 16 December, the Chorus appeared on the stage of the London Palladium. The show, Accentuate the Positive, directed by Stuart Burrows, marked the 25th anniversary of the Terrence Higgins Trust. Alison Jiear appeared on stage with the Chorus.

=== 2006 ===
To celebrate its fifteenth anniversary, the Chorus organised celebration concerts at the Cadogan Hall, London, and in Cardiff in July as well as a party at Heaven, London. The Chorus also took part in the Europride celebrations held in London, and performed at Europride 2006, The Show was produced by Sir Ian McKellen at the Royal Albert Hall in July.

In September, the Chorus was invited to take part in the prestigious international music festival, Settembre Musica in Turin, Italy. The Chorus, still collaborating with Raymond Gubbay Ltd, sold out the Barbican Hall once again with their third Christmas show there (20 December). The show was hosted by Sandi Toksvig.

=== 2005 ===
In December, the Chorus returned with a second edition of their Christmas show, Make the Yuletide Gay promoted like the previous year by Raymond Gubbay Ltd and hosted by Rula Lenska who sang and danced as well as hosting the show. The Chorus performed at Symphony Hall in Birmingham, The Concert Hall in Brighton and the Barbican Hall in London. At the same time, they released their fifth recording, and first Christmas CD, Make the Yuletide Gay.

=== 2004 ===
In December the Chorus sold out the Barbican Hall with their Christmas show Make the Yuletide Gay hosted by Simon Callow. This was the fastest ever sell-out concert for the venue. In May 2005, the Chorus took part in the Various Voices festival in Paris. In July of the same year, they gave three performances of You'll Do For Now at the Cadogan Hall, London. The show, devised by a Chorus member, charted the lives of four gay men in London over the second half of the twentieth century. The inclusion of a narrative thread to a show was a new artistic challenge for the Chorus.

== Online presence ==
In addition to its corporate website, the Chorus has a wide online presence on social media. Its recordings can be found on most music download websites.

== Discography ==
=== XXV (2016) ===
A studio recording to celebrate the Silver Jubilee of the LGMC. Featuring live recordings from the History show at Cadogan Hall in June 2016, and studio recordings at Henry Wood Hall.

No.	Title	Length
1.	"Diamond's are a Girl's Best Friend"	3:31
2.	"One Day Like This"	4:39
3.	"I Sing the Body Electric"	4:20
4.	"These are the Days of Our Lives"	5:08
5.	"Let's Do It (Let's Fall in Love)"	2:04
6.	"A Nightingale Sang in Berkeley Square"	4:23
7.	"Memphis Skyline"	4:33
8.	"Candyman"	3:27
9.	"Through the Barricades"	5:15
10.	"Get Happy"	3:16
11.	"Rise Like a Phoenix"	3:49
12.	"Bridge Over Troubled Water"	5:17
13.	"Mr Blue Sky"	3:47
14.	"The Way Old Friends Do"	3:06

=== Accentuate the Positive (2009) ===
A studio recording of the LGMC sell-out show Accentuate the Positive. First performed at the London Palladium, December 2007

No.	Title	Length
1.	"Accentuate the Positive"	02:20
2.	"Let's Face the Music and Dance"	02:28
3.	"One Night Only"	03:11
4.	"Bless the Broken Road"	03:55
5.	"Trust the Wind" (featuring Alison Jiear)	03:53
6.	"Don't You Worry 'Bout a Thing"	03:28
7.	"The Internet is for Porn"	01:54
8.	"I Cain't Say No"	03:01
9.	"Seasons of Love"	03:35
10.	"Ya Gotta Look Out for Yourself"	01:55
11.	"Being Alive"	03:18
12.	"House of Fun"	02:46
13.	"What I Did for Love"	04:01
14.	"Life is a Celebration"	02:58
15.	"Non, Je Ne Regrette Rien"	03:16
16.	"Last Dance" (featuring Alison Jiear)	03:51
Total length:		49:50

=== Make the Yuletide Gay (2005) ===
The LGMC Christmas show from 2005.

No.	Title	Length
1.	"Have Yourself a Merry Little Christmas"	02:20
2.	"Children Go Where I Send Thee"	02:52
3.	"All I Want for Christmas"	03:59
4.	"We Need a Little Christmas"	05:09
5.	"Santa Baby"	02:49
6.	"I don't Remember Christmas"	02:29
7.	"Deck the Halls"	01:14
8.	"Walking in the Air"	04:05
9.	"Carol of the Bells"	01:26
10.	"Coventry Carol"	03:48
11.	"Stopping by Wood"	04:22
12.	"Gaudete"	01:55
13.	"O Magnum Mysterium"	02:45
14.	"Homeless"	03:36
15.	"Carol Suite"	13:18
Total length:		42.49

=== From the Ritz to the Anchor & Crown (2004) ===
LGMC's collection of audience favourites.

No.	Title	Length
1.	"London Pride"	04:22
2.	"Keep Your Lamps"	02:59
3.	"Barbie Girl"	03:20
4.	"We Kiss in a Shadow"	04:31
5.	"The Cuckoo"	02:22
6.	"What We Did for Love"	04:03
7.	"The Trolley Song"	04:03
8.	"Stopping by Woods on a Snowy Evening"	05:41
9.	"Kiss Him Goodbye"	03:26
10.	"Mil Harddach Wyt Na'r Rhosyn Gwyn"	02:55
11.	"Teddy Bears' Picnic"	03:32
12.	"Cantique de Jean Racine"	06:29
13.	"Not a Day Goes By"	04:37
14.	"It's Raining Men"	05:13
15.	"Love Don't Need a Reason"	04:11
16.	"Keep it Gay"	05:34
Total length:		67.18

=== Showtime (2003) ===
This CD is a selection of songs from the LGMC 2003 touring production, Tying the Knot.

No.	Title	Length
1.	"Welcome"	01:08
2.	"All I Care About Is Love"	03:03
3.	"Sing Me Not a Ballad"	03:35
4.	"Seasons of Love"	03:53
5.	"Compere"	00:32
6.	"Heaven Help My Heart"	03:55
7.	"Mein Herr"	04:45
8.	"Back in Business"	02:58
9.	"Emcee"	01:31
10.	"Tea for Two"	04:07
11.	"The Masochism Tango"	04:59
12.	"I Am a Vamp"	05:10
13.	"Compere"	00:11
14.	"Happy Birthday"	00:40
15.	"Stand By Your Man"	03:53
16.	"Lady Marmalade"	04:51
17.	"Come What May"	05:54
Total length:		55:05

=== Moving Ahead (2002) ===
Recorded (mostly) live in front of the capacity audiences for the Golden Reign concerts staged in the Queen Elizabeth Hall, London, July 2002.

No.	Title	Length
1.	"The Rose"	04:00
2.	"Can't Get You Out of My Head"	04:47
3.	"Sweet Love Doth Now Invite"	02:01
4.	"Kiss Him Goodbye"	03:26
5.	"Can You Feel The Love Tonight" (Surrey Harmony)	02:52
6.	"Hymne A L'Amour (Surrey Harmony)" (Surrey Harmony)	03:16
7.	"Claire De Lune" (Melo'men)	04:46
8.	"Choros No. 3" (Melo'men)	03:58
9.	"Entrance and March of The Peers"	05:55
10.	"Doors – from Closer Than Ever"	03:22
11.	"I Will Follow Him"	03:47
12.	"Homeless"	03:38
13.	"I Don't Hear The Drums" (Kander & Ebb medley)	08:43
14.	"Dancing Queen"	04:08
15.	"Celebration"	05:38
16.	"Bedlam / O Waly Waly" (Studio Recording)	06:30
17.	"Teddy Bear" (Studio Recording)	01:47
18.	"Dancing Queen" (Studio Recording)	04:03
Total length:		76:37

=== Hear the Difference (1998) ===
LGMC's first effort in CD production mostly recorded at the Croydon Lesbian and Gay Forum show held in 1998.

No.	Title	Length
1.	"Rhythm of Life"	03:59
2.	"Nkosi Sikelel' I Afrika"	03:11
3.	"On a Clear Day"	03:16
4.	"Add A Riff"	02:05
5.	"Moon River"	04:20
6.	"Thulanklazlya & Sin Je Je Je"	02:32
7.	"Chim Chim Cheree"	02:59
8.	"Ride the Chariot"	02:33
9.	"What the World Needs Now Is Love"	02:51
10.	"Georgy Girl"	02:08
11.	"I Will Follow Him"	03:47
12.	"Bushes and Briars"	02:34
13.	"Aquarius / Let the Sunshine In"	03:29
14.	"Gimme! Gimme! Gimme!"	02:33
15.	"Hava Nagila"	03:25
16.	"Hello Dolly"	02:48
17.	"Something Inside So Strong"	04:29
Total length:		52:59
