= Somebody to Love Me (Mark Ronson & The Business Intl. song) =

2010 single by Mark Ronson & The Business Intl. featuring Boy George and Andrew Wyatt

Single by Mark Ronson & The Business Intl. featuring Boy George and Andrew Wyatt

from the album Record Collection
- Released: 26 November 2010
- Genre: Alternative hip hop, synthpop
- Length: 4:58
- Label: Columbia
- Songwriters: Anthony Rossomando; Andrew Wyatt; Mark Ronson; Cathy Dennis; Alex Greenwald; Jake Shears; K'naan; Nick Movshon
- Producer: Mark Ronson

Mark Ronson singles chronology
"The Bike Song" (2010)	"Somebody to Love Me" (2010)	"Anywhere in the World" (2012)

Boy George singles chronology
"Run" (2002)	"Somebody to Love Me" (2010)	"Amazing Grace" (2011)

Andrew Wyatt singles chronology
"Somebody to Love Me" (2010)	"Some Minds" (2015)

Music video
- "Somebody to Love Me" on YouTube

"Somebody to Love Me" is the third and final single taken from Record Collection, the third studio album by Mark Ronson, released under the moniker Mark Ronson & The Business Intl. The song features Boy George and Andrew Wyatt on vocals.

== Music video ==
The video for the track, directed by Saam Farahmand, was released on 14 October 2010. It features a club party in a home video style theme, with the date stamp "14.6.1982" - or 14 June 1982, which was Boy George's 21st birthday. However neither Ronson, Boy George or Andrew Wyatt feature in the video. Diane Kruger stars as Boy George. On the 21 December 2018 episode of The Graham Norton Show (S24E12) featuring Emily Blunt, Lin-Manuel Miranda, Ben Whishaw, Emily Mortimer, Boy George, and Culture Club, Boy George disclosed that Emily Blunt was originally asked to play him for the video but she was unavailable/declined.

== Charts ==
Chart (2010)	Peak position
Belgium (Ultratop 50 Flanders)	16
Belgium (Ultratop 50 Wallonia)	50
Israel International Airplay (Media Forest)	4
UK Singles (OCC)	55

The song also reached number 10 in Australia's Triple J Hottest 100 for 2010.

== Release history ==
Region	Release	Format	Ref.
United Kingdom	26 November 2010	Digital download, 12"	
