= Bang Bang Bang (Mark Ronson song) =

Single by Mark Ronson & The Business Intl. featuring Q-Tip and MNDR

from the album Record Collection
- Released: 9 July 2010
- Studio: Dunham Studios (Brooklyn, New York City); Downtown Music Studios (Manhattan, New York City)
- Genre: Alternative hip hop; synth-pop
- Length: 3:54
- Label: Columbia
- Songwriters: Amanda Warner; Kamaal Fareed; Nick Hodgson; Mark Ronson; Alex Greenwald; Homer Steinweiss; Peter Wade Keusch
- Producer: Mark Ronson

Mark Ronson singles chronology
"Just" (2008)	"Bang Bang Bang" (2010)	"The Bike Song" (2010)

Q-Tip singles chronology
"Move" (2008)	"Bang Bang Bang" (2010)	"A Little Party Never Killed Nobody (All We Got)" (2013)

MNDR singles chronology
"C.L.U.B." (2009)	"Bang Bang Bang" (2010)	"Caligula" (2010)

"Bang Bang Bang" is a song from Mark Ronson's 2010 album Record Collection. The song features performances by Q-Tip and MNDR. 'Bang Bang Bang' was released as the album's lead single on 9 July 2010 in the United Kingdom. The full album, Record Collection, was released on 24 September 2010.

The song is based on the popular French-Canadian children's song "Alouette", meaning "skylark". The chorus directly references lyrics from "Alouette", including the line "Je te plumerai la tête" (meaning "I shall pluck your head"). The beginning of the music video also depicts a young girl singing the opening lines to "Alouette". "Bang Bang Bang" debuted at number six on the UK Singles Chart with 50,170 copies sold in its first week.

== Critical reception ==
Renowned for Sound states, "An '80s synth infused toe tapper, the Brit award winning DJ and producer has called on the talents of rapper friend Q-Tip and vocalist MNDR to create a nice slice of synth happy pop. A progressive step from his previous jazzy singles and an appropriate move considering the success of the synth-pop influx lately, he proves that if something works then go with the flow," and "The melody is infectious and Q-tip’s rapping merged with MNDR’s boppy vocals mix well."

Anthony Hill from Clickmusic describes "Bang Bang Bang" as having "the impromptu charm and inexorable appeal of a 1980s New York block party". He further comments, "'Un, deux, trois' slams the intro, revealing the exact number of seconds it takes Mark Ronson's latest effort to gatecrash its way into the brain. Once lodged among the neurons, it deftly impels every muscle and limb to move spasmodically to its infectious beat."

Sarah-Louise James of The Daily Star wrote, "The new sound is a short, sharp slap in the face to anyone who thought they'd got the measure of Ronno. It's barmy and brilliant, fresh and fantastic."

== Music video ==
The music video for "Bang Bang Bang", featuring (from left to right) Q-Tip, Mark Ronson, and Amanda Warner.

The music video was directed by Warren Fu.

Daniel Kreps from Rolling Stone described the video as:

Bookended by two seemingly unrelated pieces of footage – a fictitious retro commercial for sandwich spread and a dramatic tennis match – stars Ronson as the guest on an offbeat, '70s-style Japanese talk show. When he's asked to chat about his music, Ronson transforms into a smooth Bryan Ferry figure and hops behind a bank of synthesisers to perform his latest composition. The clip is equal parts American Bandstand and Tron – and the most effective time-capsule music video since Snoop Dogg resurrected the Rick James era with "Sexual Eruption".

== Usage in media ==
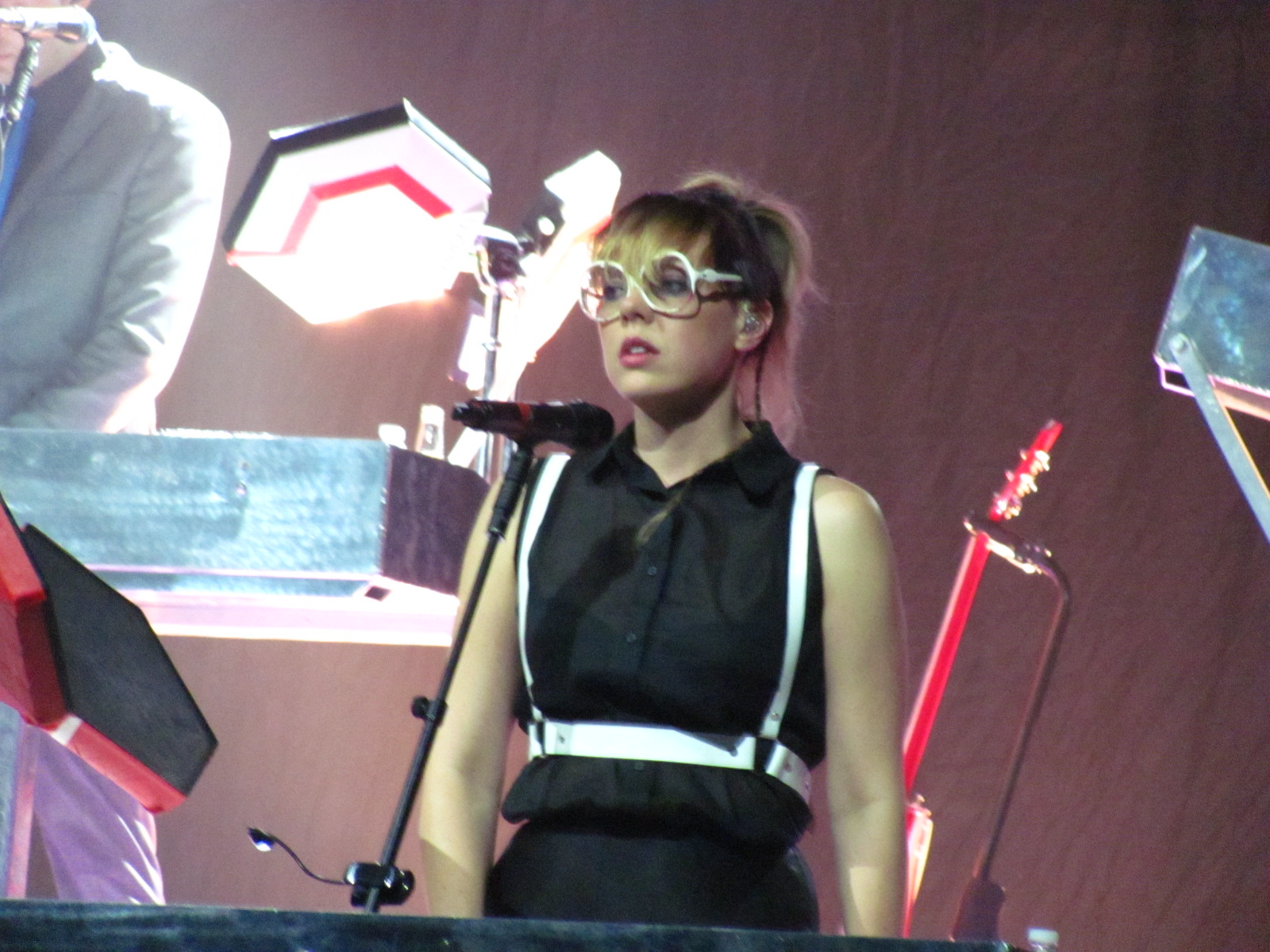
MNDR performing the song with Ronson and Q-Tip at Webster Hall in October 2010

"Bang Bang Bang" was featured in episodes of Gossip Girl, 90210, CSI: Crime Scene Investigation and Entourage. The song was also used in the 2011 comedy film No Strings Attached and appears on its No Strings Attached: Music from the Motion Picture soundtrack.

"Bng Bang Bang" was used diegetically during the warehouse party scene of the season 1, episode 7 of Girls, "Welcome to Bushwick a.k.a. The Crackcident", which originally aired on May 27, 2012.

It is also heard in the season 7, episode 8 of the American television series Entourage, "Sniff Sniff Gang Bang", which originally aired on August 22, 2010.

"Bang Bang Bang" was used by the E4 TV Channel to promote the sixth series of The Big Bang Theory, from 2012-2013.

The song is featured in the soundtrack of the PlayStation Vita game Lumines Electronic Symphony.

== Track listings ==
"Bang Bang Bang"
A sample of "Bang Bang Bang"

- Amazon MP3 single
1. "Bang Bang Bang" – 4:05
2. "Bang Bang Bang" (Count and Sinden Remix) – 5:23
- iTunes EP
1. "Bang Bang Bang" – 4:05
2. "Bang Bang Bang" (Count and Sinden Remix) – 5:21
3. "Bang Bang Bang" (Russ Chimes Remix) – 6:12
- US iTunes EP
1. "Bang Bang Bang" – 4:05
2. "Bang Bang Bang" (Count and Sinden Remix) – 5:22
3. "Bang Bang Bang" (Russ Chimes Remix) – 6:10
4. "Bang Bang Bang" (SBTRKT Remix) – 3:50
- 12" single

A1. "Bang Bang Bang" (Album Version) – 4:05
A2. "Bang Bang Bang" (Russ Chimes Remix) – 6:10
B1. "Bang Bang Bang" (Count and Sinden Remix) – 5:22
B2. "Bang Bang Bang" (SBTRKT Remix) – 5:02

== Personnel ==
Credits adapted from 12" single liner notes.

- Mark Ronson – production
- Ona Ascoli – backing vocals
- Victor Axelrod – keyboards
- Thomas Brenneck – recording
- Joseph Elmhirst – backing vocals
- Tom Elmhirst – mixing
- Emmett Farley – assistant recording
- Brian Gardner – mastering
- Nick Hodgson – backing vocals
- Peter Wade Keusch – engineering, vocal production, synths, writing
- Mat Maitland – art direction, imagery
- Vaughan Merrick – additional engineering, editing, programming, recording
- MNDR – keyboards, vocals
- Nick Movshon – bass
- Rob Murray – recording
- Dan Parry – mixing assistant
- Q-Tip – vocals
- Gerard Saint – art direction
- Scarlet Smith – backing vocals
- Bryony Shearmur – portraits
- Stevie Smith – backing vocals
- Homer Steinweiss – drums
- Amanda Warner – additional programming

== Charts ==
Chart (2010)	Peak position
Australia (ARIA)	16
Austria (Ö3 Austria Top 40)	75
Belgium (Ultratip Bubbling Under Flanders)	3
Belgium (Ultratip Bubbling Under Wallonia)	19
Denmark Airplay (Tracklisten)	18
European Hot 100 Singles	18
Germany (GfK)	43
Ireland (IRMA)	18
Japan (Japan Hot 100)	37
Netherlands (Single Top 100)	68
New Zealand (Recorded Music NZ)	25
Scottish Singles Sales (Official Charts)	7
South Korea International (Circle)	43
Switzerland (Schweizer Hitparade)	65
UK Singles (Official Charts)	6

== Certifications ==
Certifications for "Bang Bang Bang"
Region	Certification	Certified units/sales
Australia (ARIA)	Gold	35,000^{‡}
New Zealand (RMNZ)	Gold	7,500^{*}
United Kingdom (BPI)	Silver	200,000^{*}
^{*} Sales figures based on certification alone.^{‡} Sales+streaming figures based on certification alone.
