= Diamonds Are Invincible =

Single by Michael Jackson and Mark Ronson
- Released: August 29, 2018
- Length: 5:00
- Label: Epic
- Songwriters: Michael Jackson; Teddy Riley; Bernard Belle; Steve Porcaro; John Bettis; Rodney Jerkins; Fred Jerkins III; LaShawn Daniels; Nora Payne
- Producer: Mark Ronson

Michael Jackson singles chronology
"Don't Matter to Me" (2018)	"Diamonds Are Invincible" (2018)	"Say Say Say" (2023)

Mark Ronson singles chronology
"Everyday" (2015)	"Diamonds Are Invincible" (2018)	"Nothing Breaks Like a Heart" (2018)

Music video
- "Michael Jackson x Mark Ronson: Diamonds Are Invincible" on YouTube

"Michael Jackson x Mark Ronson: Diamonds Are Invincible", often shortened to just "Diamonds Are Invincible", is a song by Michael Jackson and Mark Ronson. The mashup was released digitally on what would have been Jackson's 60th birthday, August 29, 2018.

== Background and release ==
On August 29, 2018, for the celebration of Jackson's 60th birthday, "Diamonds Are Invincible" premiered worldwide. The song is a mash-up composed of eight of Jackson's hit songs—"Don't Stop 'Til You Get Enough", "Wanna Be Startin' Somethin'", "Billie Jean", "Smooth Criminal", "Remember the Time", "Human Nature", "You Rock My World" and "The Way You Make Me Feel".

== Track listing ==
Digital single
No.	Title	Length
1.	"Michael Jackson x Mark Ronson: Diamonds Are Invincible"	5:00
