= Watch the Sound with Mark Ronson =

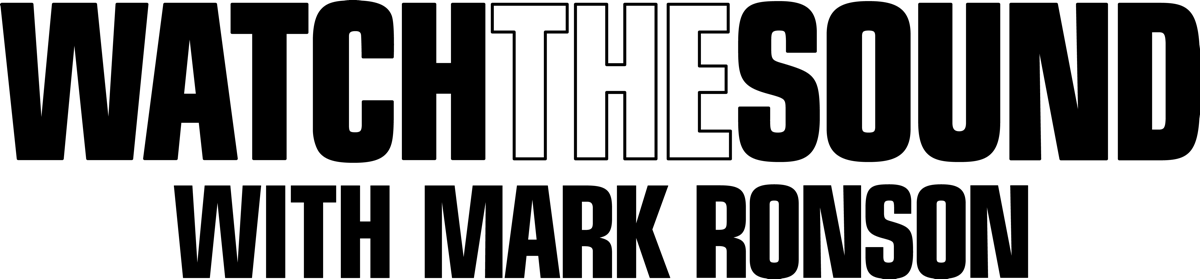
- Genre: Documentary series
- Created by: Morgan Neville
- Presented by: Mark Ronson
- Country of origin: United States
- Original language: English
- No. of seasons: 1
- No. of episodes: 6

Production
- Executive producers: Mark Ronson; Morgan Neville; Mark Monroe; Jason Zeldes; Kim Rozenfeld
- Production company: Tremolo Productions

Original release
- Network: Apple TV+
- Release: July 30, 2021

Watch the Sound with Mark Ronson is an American documentary series created by Morgan Neville, and hosted by Mark Ronson. The series premiered on Apple TV+ on July 30, 2021.

The series was not renewed for a second season.

== Episodes ==
No.	Title	Featured guest(s)	Original release date
1	"Auto-Tune"	Ezra Koenig, Ariel Rechtshaid, Dr Andy Hildebrand, King Princess, T-Pain, Charli XCX, Paul McCartney, Sean Ono Lennon, Ash Koosha, Ilsey Juber	July 30, 2021
2	"Sampling"	Paul McCartney, DJ Premier, Beastie Boys	July 30, 2021
3	"Reverb"	Angel Olsen, King Princess, Jonsi	July 30, 2021
4	"Synthesizers"	Kevin Parker, Gary Numan, members of Duran Duran, Paul McCartney	July 30, 2021
5	"Drum Machines"	Questlove, Too Short, Beastie Boys, Dave Grohl, King Princess	July 30, 2021
6	"Distortion"	Vernon Reid, Dave Grohl, Josh Homme, Santigold, Kathleen Hanna, Beastie Boys, Denzel Curry, Thurston Moore	July 30, 2021

== Production ==
On April 13, 2021, it was announced that Apple TV+ had picked up a six-part documentary series hosted by Mark Ronson. In the series, Ronson will "examine sound creation and revolutionary technology used to shape music, [...] and the lengths producers and creators are willing to go to find the perfect sound".

The series is executive produced by Ronson, Morgan Neville for Tremolo Productions, Mark Monroe, Jason Zeldes and Kim Rozenfeld.
