= The Bike Song =

2010 single by Mark Ronson & The Business Intl. featuring Kyle Falconer and Spank Rock

Single by Mark Ronson & The Business Intl. featuring Kyle Falconer and Spank Rock

from the album Record Collection
- B-side: "The Bike Song"; (The View version)
- Released: 17 September 2010
- Genre: Alternative hip hop
- Length: 3:46 (Single version); 4:25 (Album version)
- Label: Columbia
- Songwriters: Dave McCabe, Homer Steinweiss, Naeem Juwan, Victor Axelrod, Thomas Brenneck
- Producer: Mark Ronson

Mark Ronson singles chronology
"Bang Bang Bang" (2010)	"The Bike Song" (2010)	"Somebody to Love Me" (2010)

Kyle Falconer singles chronology
"The Bike Song" (2010)	"Laura" (2021)

Spank Rock singles chronology
"Bump" (2006)	"The Bike Song" (2010)	"Energy" (2011)

"The Bike Song" is the second single taken from Record Collection, the third studio album by Mark Ronson, released under the moniker Mark Ronson & The Business Intl. The song featured singer Kyle Falconer from Scottish indie rock band The View and American rapper Spank Rock. It was released on 17 September 2010 in the UK.

== Music video ==
The music video was directed by Warren Fu and shot in a South London park. It features Kyle Falconer and Spank Rock as well as a cameo by Ronson's wife, actress and musician Joséphine de La Baume, actress Felicity Jones and Rose Elinor Dougall (who is currently in Mark Ronson's touring band).

The song was also used for a video promoting cycling on the Transport for London website, featuring celebrities cycling around some of their favourite parts of London.

== Critical reception ==
Fraser McAlpine of BBC Chart Blog gave the song a positive review stating:

Pop music often searches to find the eternal in the everyday. Songs attempt to freeze time around one emotional moment - I haven't got enough money! I wish I could wish on a falling star! Girls are sexy! - and to make sure it's communicated to as many people as possible, it'll often take place in the most mundane of locations: a street, the house you grew up in, a nightclub.

It's partly because gems often shine brighter when placed against a dull background, and partly a way to bring extra reality to the situation, so it feels truer. In the same way that we all tend to sit up and take a bit more notice of a film that says that it is based on a true story.

This is why it's a good idea to write a song with a bike in it. It's not just a fun hook to hang a lyric from, it speaks to our inner child. Most of us have ridden a bike, right? Well this sings to the part of us that yearns for a simpler life, free of boring distractions.

In fact (drumroll) it's not just a pop song, it's an integral part of the cycle of life (TISH!)..

== Track listings ==
Digital download
No.	Title	Length
1.	"The Bike Song"	4:23
2.	"The Bike Song" (Major Lazer Remix)	3:33
3.	"The Bike Song" (Lil Silva Remix)	5:37

== Charts ==
Chart performance for "The Bike Song"
Chart (2010)	Peak position
Australia (ARIA)	66
European Hot 100 Singles (Billboard)	64
Scotland Singles (OCC)	10
UK Singles (OCC)	17
