= Record Collection (album) =

Studio album by Mark Ronson & the Business Intl.
- Released: 24 September 2010
- Genres: Alternative hip-hop; synth-pop; new wave; alternative dance
- Length: 47:23
- Labels: Allido; RCA; Columbia; J
- Producer: Mark Ronson

Mark Ronson chronology
Version (2007)	Record Collection (2010)	Uptown Special (2015)

Singles from Record Collection
- 1. "Bang Bang Bang" Released: 9 July 2010; 2. "The Bike Song" Released: 17 September 2010; 3. "Somebody to Love Me" Released: 26 November 2010

Record Collection is the third studio album by British musician, DJ and producer Mark Ronson. The album was released under the moniker Mark Ronson & The Business Intl. and was released on 27 September 2010 in the UK and on 28 September 2010 in the US.

== Album cover ==
The cover, credited to art directors Gerard Saint and Mat Maitland, made reference to several famous record covers, notably Rio by Duran Duran (whose members, Simon Le Bon and Nick Rhodes, appeared on the album).

== Singles ==
- "Bang Bang Bang" was the first single released from the album, on 9 July 2010. The single peaked at number 6 on the UK Singles Chart, marking Ronson's fourth Top 10 hit; as well as peaking at number 18 on the Irish Singles Chart.
- "The Bike Song" was the second single released, on 17 September 2010.
- "Somebody to Love Me" was the third single released. It was to be released on 6 December 2010, however due to high interest in the single, it was moved forward to 26 November 2010.
- The title track also appeared in EA Sports game, FIFA 11.

== Critical reception ==
Professional ratings
Aggregate scores
Source	Rating
Metacritic	70/100
Review scores
Source	Rating
AllMusic	4/5 stars
The A.V. Club	A−
Clash	6/10
Entertainment Weekly	B+
NME	7/10
Pitchfork	5.4/10
PopMatters	7/10 discs
Rolling Stone	3.5/5 stars
Slant Magazine	3/5 stars
Spin	7/10

Record Collection was generally well-received by critics. It holds a score of 70 on Metacritic, indicating "generally favorable reviews". The A.V. Club's Marc Hawthorne assigned the album a grade of A−, saying: "Ronson raised the bar pretty high by making the synth fantasy 'Bang Bang Bang' the lead single and placing it first on the album... but there's enough big-bang boom throughout to make Record Collection feel complete." Other positive reviews came from Entertainment Weekly, who described the album as "impressively varied" and added that "Ronson's got the production chops to hold it all together;" and AllMusic, who praised the album as "one of the best albums of [Ronson's] career." A review from Pitchfork writer Stephen M. Deusner was mixed – "It's a bit too clipped and choppy to be especially funky," he wrote, "but it does keep things fleet and agile as Ronson introduces and develops new ideas, revealing a musical curiosity that Version seemed to preclude." Other reviews, while praising guests such as Boy George and Rose Elinor Dougall, were unimpressed by Ronson's stylistic approach. Dot Music described the album as "disappointingly weak", while Uncut noted that the album's guests were the only thing that "save[s] the venture from total ignominy."

== Track listing ==
Record Collection track listing
No.	Title	Writer(s)	Length
1.	"Bang Bang Bang" (featuring Q-Tip and MNDR)	Mark Ronson; Alex Greenwald; Homer Steinweiss; Amanda Warner; Kamaal Fareed; Nick Hodgson; Peter Wade Keusch	3:53
2.	"Lose It (In the End)" (featuring Ghostface Killah and Alex Greenwald)	Ronson; Greenwald; Jonathan Pierce; Dennis Coles; Nick Movshon	2:25
3.	"The Bike Song" (featuring Kyle Falconer and Spank Rock)	Ronson; Steinweiss; Dave McCabe; Naeem Juwan Hanks; Victor Axelrod; Thomas Brenneck	4:25
4.	"Somebody to Love Me" (featuring Boy George and Andrew Wyatt)	Ronson; Greenwald; Movshon; Anthony Rossomando; Andrew Wyatt; Cathy Dennis; Jake Shears; K'naan	4:58
5.	"You Gave Me Nothing" (featuring Rose Elinor Dougall and Andrew Wyatt)	Ronson; Pierce	4:00
6.	"The Colour of Crumar"	Ronson	1:28
7.	"Glass Mountain Trust" (featuring D'Angelo)	Ronson; Rossomando; Michael Archer	3:46
8.	"Circuit Breaker"	Ronson; Greenwald; Shimon Nolfo	4:24
9.	"Introducing the Business" (featuring Pill and London Gay Men's Chorus)	Ronson; Greenwald; Axelrod; Brenneck; Tyrone Rivers	3:42
10.	"Record Collection" (featuring Simon Le Bon and Wiley)	Ronson; Greenwald; Hodgson; Richard Cowie	3:49
11.	"Selector"	Ronson; Greenwald	1:06
12.	"Hey Boy" (featuring Rose Elinor Dougall and Theophilus London)	Ronson; Kai Fish; Theophilus London III	3:34
13.	"Missing Words"	Ronson; Greenwald; Movshon	1:29
14.	"The Night Last Night" (featuring Rose Elinor Dougall and Alex Greenwald)	Ronson; Greenwald; Rose Elinor Dougall; Charles Waller	4:24

Record Collection — iTunes Store deluxe edition bonus tracks
No.	Title	Writer(s)	Length
15.	"Sound of Plastic" (featuring Nick Rhodes, Rose Elinor Dougall, Spank Rock, Jamie Reynolds, and Anthony Rossomando)	Ronson; Dougall; Rhodes; Jamie Reynolds; Naeem Juwan Hanks	5:06
16.	"Bang Bang Bang" (The Count & Sinden remix)	Ronson; Greenwald; Steinweiss; Warner; Fareed; Hodgson; Keusch	5:22
17.	"The Bike Song" (Major Lazer remix)	Ronson; Greenwald; Steinweiss; Warner; Fareed; Hodgson; Keusch	3:33
18.	"Teeko Takes the Crate" (Record Collection Mastermix)		28:21

Record Collection — iTunes Store LP edition bonus videos
No.	Title	Length
19.	"Bang Bang Bang" (music video)	5:19
20.	"The Bike Song" (music video)	4:57
21.	"Circuit Breaker" (music video)	2:34
22.	"Record Collection" (making of the album)	5:48
23.	"Bang Bang Bang" (making of the video)	2:17
24.	"The Bike Song" (making of the video)	3:54

Record Collection — French re-issue bonus track
No.	Title	Writer(s)	Length
15.	"Record Collection 2012" (featuring Simon Le Bon, Simon Luque, Wiley, MNDR, Pharrell and Wretch 32)	Ronson; Greenwald; Hodgson; Cowie; Axelrod; Pharrell Williams; Jermaine Scott	4:02

== Personnel ==
=== The Business Intl. ===
- Mark Ronson – guitar, percussion, keyboards, drum machine, bass, bells, lead vocals on "Lose It (In the End)", co-lead vocals on "Record Collection"
- Nick Movshon – bass, drums
- Victor Axelrod – keyboards, percussion
- Homer Steinwess – drums
- Rose Elinor Dougall – keyboards, co-lead vocals on "You Gave Me Nothing" and "The Night Last Night", lead vocals on "Hey Boy" and "Sound of Plastic"

=== Additional personnel ===
- Kamaal "Q-Tip" Fareed – rapping on "Bang, Bang, Bang"
- Amanda Warner – lead vocals, keyboards and programming on "Bang, Bang, Bang"
- Nick Hodgson – backing vocals on "Bang, Bang, Bang"
- Ghostface Killah – rapping on "Lose It (In the End)"
- Thomas Brenneck – lead guitar on "Lose It (In the End)", bass on "Hey Boy"
- Alex Greenwald – percussion on "Lose It (In the End)", keyboards on "Circuit Breaker" and "Record Collection", lead vocals on "The Night Last Night"
- Kyle Falconer – lead vocals and bells on "The Bike Song"
- Spank Rock – rapping on "The Bike Song" and "Sound of Plastic"
- Boy George – lead vocals on "Somebody to Love Me"
- Andrew Wyatt – backing vocals on "Somebody to Love Me", lead vocals on "You Gave Me Nothing"
- D'Angelo – lead vocals on "Glass Mountain Trust"
- Teeko – turntables on "Circuit Breaker"
- Pill – rapping on "Introducing the Business"
- London Gay Men's Chorus – backing vocals on "Introducing the Business"
- Nick Rhodes – keyboards on "Record Collection", all instruments on "Sound of Plastic"
- Simon Le Bon – co-lead vocals on "Record Collection"
- Wiley – rapping on "Record Collection"
- Theophilus London – rapping and toasting on "Hey Boy"
- Jamie Reynolds – vocals on "Sound of Plastic"
- Anthony Rossomando – vocals on "Sound of Plastic"

=== Production credits ===
- All tracks produced by Mark Ronson, except "Sound of Plastic", produced by Nick Rhodes and Mark Ronson.
- Mixed by Tom Elmhirst assisted by Dan Parry at Metropolis Studios, London.
- Recorded by Thomas Brenneck and Vaughan Merrick at Dunham Studios, Brooklyn, New York except "Sound of Plastic", recorded and mixed by Joshua Blair at Sphere Studios, London.
- Additional engineering, editing and programming by Vaughan Merrick at 90 West Street, New York apart from "The Color of Crumar" (recorded by Ben Kane and D'angelo assisted by Chris Soper and mixed by Ben Kane at MSR Studios and Electric Lady Studios), "Selector" and "Missing Words" (recorded by Thomas Brenneck and Vaughan Merrick and mixed by Kennie Takahashi at Little Big Room, Los Angeles).
- Mastered by Brian Gardner at Bernie Grundman Mastering, Los Angeles.
- Executive produced by Dominic Treniere and Alex Greenwald.

== Charts ==
=== Weekly charts ===
Weekly chart performance for Record Collection
Chart (2010)	Peak position
Australian Albums (ARIA)	6
Belgian Albums (Ultratop Flanders)	61
Belgian Albums (Ultratop Wallonia)	60
Dutch Albums (Album Top 100)	67
French Albums (SNEP)	48
Irish Albums (IRMA)	16
New Zealand Albums (RMNZ)	33
Scottish Albums (Official Charts)	3
Swiss Albums (Schweizer Hitparade)	40
UK Albums (Official Charts)	2
US Billboard 200	81
US Top Alternative Albums (Billboard)	20

=== Year-end charts ===
Year-end chart performance for Record Collection
Chart (2010)	Position
UK Albums (OCC)	170

== Release history ==
Release history and formats for Record Collection
Country	Date	Format	Label	Catalogue
Ireland	24 September 2010	CD, digital download	Columbia	
United Kingdom	27 September 2010	CD, digital download	Columbia	88697736332
Poland	27 September 2010	CD, digital download	Columbia	65011089
United States	28 September 2010	CD, digital download	Columbia	
Canada	28 September 2010	CD, digital download	Columbia	
