= List of awards and nominations received by ASAP Rocky =

ASAP Rocky awards and nominations
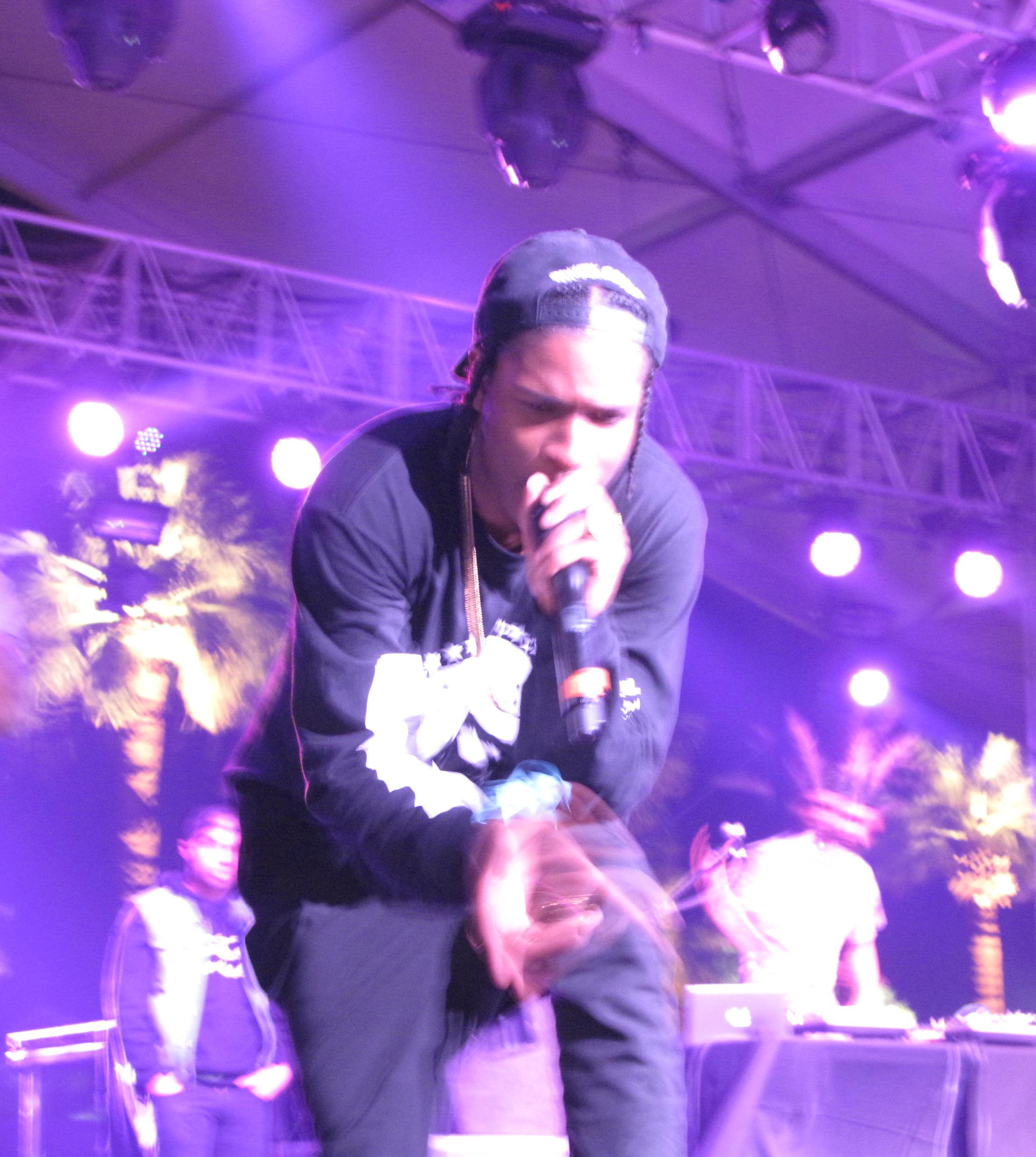
- ASAP Rocky performing in 2012
Awards and nominations
Award	Wins	Nominations
BET Awards	1	10
BET Hip Hop Awards	3	7
Grammy Awards	0	3
MTV Europe Music Awards	0	2
MTV Video Music Awards	0	3

Totals (Note: Certain award groups do not simply award one winner. They acknowledge several different recipients, have runners-up, and have third place. Since this is a specific recognition and is different from losing an award, runner-up mentions are considered wins in this award tally. For simplification and to avoid errors, each award in this list has been presumed to have had a prior nomination.)
- Wins: 5
- Nominations: 67

This is a list of awards and nominations received by American rapper ASAP Rocky.

== Awards and nominations ==
Award	Year	Work	Category	Result	Ref.
BBC Sound of	2011	Himself	Sound of 2012	Nominated	
Berlin Music Video Awards	2025	"Gansta"	Best Editor	Nominated	
Berlin Music Video Awards	2026	"PUNK ROCKY"	Best Narrative	Nominated	
BET Awards	2012	Himself	Best New Artist	Nominated	
BET Awards	2013	Himself	Best Male Hip-Hop Artist	Nominated	
BET Awards	2013	Himself	Video Director of the Year	Nominated	
BET Awards	2013	"Fuckin' Problems"	Video of the Year	Nominated	
BET Awards	2013	"Fuckin' Problems"	Best Collaboration	Won	
BET Awards	2013	"Fuckin' Problems"	Viewer's Choice	Nominated	
BET Awards	2023	Himself	Video Director of the Year	Nominated	
BET Awards	2026	Himself	Best male Hip-Hop Artist	Nominated	
BET Awards	2026	Himself	Fashion Vanguard Award	Nominated	
BET Awards	2026	Himself and Dan Streit	Video Director of the Year	Nominated	
BET Hip Hop Awards	2012	Himself	Rookie of the Year	Nominated	
BET Hip Hop Awards	2012	Himself	Best Live Performer	Nominated	
BET Hip Hop Awards	2012	Himself	Made-You-Look Award	Nominated	
BET Hip Hop Awards	2012	"Goldie"	Best Hip Hop Video	Nominated	
BET Hip Hop Awards	2012	LIVE.LOVE.A$AP	Best Mixtape	Nominated	
BET Hip Hop Awards	2012	Himself (with Sam Lecca)	Video Director of the Year	Nominated	
BET Hip Hop Awards	2013	Himself (with A$AP Ferg)	Video Director of the Year	Nominated	
BET Hip Hop Awards	2013	"Fuckin' Problems" (featuring Drake, 2 Chainz and Kendrick Lamar)	Best Collaboration, Duo or Group	Won	
BET Hip Hop Awards	2013	"Fuckin' Problems" (featuring Drake, 2 Chainz and Kendrick Lamar)	Best Hip-Hop Video	Nominated	
BET Hip Hop Awards	2013	"Fuckin' Problems" (featuring Drake, 2 Chainz and Kendrick Lamar)	People's Champ Award	Nominated	
BET Hip Hop Awards	2013	"Fuckin' Problems" (featuring Drake, 2 Chainz and Kendrick Lamar)	Best Club Banger	Nominated	
BET Hip Hop Awards	2013	Himself	Made-You-Look Award	Won	
BET Hip Hop Awards	2014	Himself	Made-You-Look Award	Nominated	
BET Hip Hop Awards	2015	Himself	Made-You-Look Award	Nominated	
BET Hip Hop Awards	2016	Himself	Made-You-Look Award	Nominated	
BET Hip Hop Awards	2017	Himself	Made-You-Look Award	Nominated	
BET Hip Hop Awards	2017	"Who Dat Boy" (featuring Tyler, The Creator)	Impact Track	Nominated	
BET Hip Hop Awards	2022	"D.M.B."	Best Hip Hop Video	Nominated	
BET Hip Hop Awards	2024	Himself	Hustler of the Year	Nominated	
BET Hip Hop Awards	2024	Himself	Video Director of the Year	Nominated	
BET Hip Hop Awards	2024	"Gangsta"	Sweet 16: Best Featured Verse	Nominated	
Berlin Music Video Awards	2020	"Kids Turned Out Fine"	Best Editor	Nominated	
Berlin Music Video Awards	2023	"Shittin me"	Best Director	Nominated	
Black Reel Awards	2024	"Am I Dreaming" (Metro Boomin, ASAP Rocky and Roisee)	Outstanding Original Song	Nominated	
Black Reel Awards	2026	Highest 2 Lowest	Outstanding Breakthrough Performance	Nominated	
Black Reel Awards	2026	Highest 2 Lowest	Outstanding Supporting Performance	Nominated	
Georgia Film Critics Association Awards	2024	"Am I Dreaming" (Metro Boomin, ASAP Rocky and Roisee)	Best Original Song	Nominated	
Grammy Awards	2014	"Fuckin' Problems"	Best Rap Song	Nominated	
Grammy Awards	2016	"LSD"	Best Music Video	Nominated	
Grammy Awards	2025	"Tailor Swif"	Best Music Video	Nominated	
Guild of Music Supervisors Awards	2024	"Am I Dreaming"	Favorite Collaboration	Nominated	
Hollywood Music in Media Awards	2023	"Am I Dreaming"	Song - Animated Film	Nominated	
Kids' Choice Awards	2016	"Good for You" (featuring Selena Gomez)	Favorite Collaboration	Nominated	
MTV Europe Music Awards	2012	Himself	US Artist About To Go Global	Nominated	
MTV Europe Music Awards	2012	Himself	Best Look	Nominated	
MTV Video Music Awards	2012	"Goldie"	Best Editing	Nominated	
MTV Video Music Awards	2013	"Fuckin' Problems"	Best Hip-Hop Video	Nominated	
MTV Video Music Awards	2015	"L$D"	Best Editing	Nominated	
MTV Video Music Awards	2015	"Good for You" (featuring Selena Gomez)	Song of Summer	Nominated	
MTV Video Music Awards	2020	"Babushka Boi"	Best Art Direction	Nominated	
MTV Video Music Awards	2026	Punk Rocky	Best Cinematography	Pending	
MTV Video Music Awards Japan	2013	"Fuckin' Problems"	Best Hip-Hop Video	Won	
mtvU Woodie Awards	2014	"Wild for the Night"	Best Collaboration Woodie	Won	
NAACP Image Awards	2017	"Blended Family (What You Do for Love)" (with Alicia Keys)	Outstanding Duo, Group or Collaboration	Nominated	
NAACP Image Awards	2026	Highest 2 Lowest	Outstanding Breakthrough Performance in a Motion Picture	Nominated	
NAACP Image Awards	2026	Highest 2 Lowest	Outstanding Supporting Actor in a Motion Picture	Nominated	
NAACP Image Awards	2026	Highest 2 Lowest	Outstanding Ensemble in a Motion Picture	Nominated	
Teen Choice Awards	2015	"Good for You" (featuring Selena Gomez)	Choice Music – Summer Song	Nominated	
World Music Awards	2014	Himself	World's Best Male Artist	Nominated	
World Music Awards	2014	Himself	World's Best Entertainer of the Year	Nominated	
World Music Awards	2014	Himself	World's Best Live Act	Nominated	
World Music Awards	2014	"Fuckin' Problems"	World's Best Song	Nominated	
World Music Awards	2014	"Fuckin' Problems"	World's Best Video	Nominated	
World Music Awards	2014	Long. Live. ASAP	World's Best Album	Nominated	
