= Jukebox Joints =

Song by ASAP Rocky featuring Joe Fox and Kanye West

from the album At. Long. Last. ASAP
- Released: May 26, 2015
- Recorded: 2014–2015
- Genre: Hip hop
- Length: 5:24
- Label: ASAP Worldwide; Polo Grounds; RCA
- Songwriter(s): Rakim Mayers; Che Pope; Kanye West; Joe Fox; Dicky Sulaksono; Warren Moore; William Robinson
- Producer(s): Pope; West

"Jukebox Joints" is a song by American rapper ASAP Rocky, featuring Joe Fox and Kanye West. It was released as the ninth track from ASAP Rocky's second studio album, At. Long. Last. ASAP (2015). An accompanying music video was released on August 10, 2015.

== Background ==
In an interview with Red Bull Music Academy, Che Pope explained how ASAP Rocky had become involved with the song:

Literally, maybe 5 in the morning one day, A$AP’s like, “Che, I know you got a bunch of soul samples.” He’s like, “I want to make a jukebox song.” Unbeknownst to me, that Kanye had actually already given him a track that I had given Kanye so then we just ended up adding onto it. I didn’t know it was going to be that long.

== Critical reception ==
Meaghan Garvey of Pitchfork praised "Jukebox Joints" as being "back-to-basics", writing that ASAP Rocky has "got real shit to say". Billboard complimented Fox's appearance on the song, as well as his other features on At. Long. Last. ASAP, writing that he "anchors almost a third of the album with sung hooks".

== Tonight Show performance ==
On June 11, 2015, Rocky was joined by The Roots on The Tonight Show Starring Jimmy Fallon to perform "Jukebox Joints" along with At. Long. Last. ASAP single "LSD". As Jimmy Fallon himself alluded to, it wasn't clear exactly how seriously Rocky had taken the drug-tinged lyrics of both songs before the performance, since it began with him reclining in a bed. The performance saw him rise from the bed to rap a medley of "Jukebox Joints" and "LSD".

== Samples ==
"Jukebox Joints" contains samples of several songs: "Doa untuk Kekasih" (1972), performed by Indonesian band Rasela; "Much Better Off" (1968), performed by Smokey Robinson and The Miracles; and "Who Cares" (1975), performed by Tony Aiken and Future 2000.

== Music video ==
On August 10, 2015, the music video for "Jukebox Joints" was released. It shows ASAP Mob relaxing in a variety of places, ranging from bedrooms to subway stations and the effects of psychedelic colours and smoke are used within the video. The version of the track used for the music video is different from the album version, as West's verse is not included. He doesn't appear in the video either, despite being credited as a feature in the title.

== Commercial performance ==
The song peaked at number 7 on the US Billboard Bubbling Under R&B/Hip-Hop Singles chart and spent a total of two weeks on it.

== Charts ==
Chart (2015)	Peak position
US Bubbling Under R&B/Hip-Hop Singles (Billboard)	7

== Certifications ==
Region	Certification	Certified units/sales
New Zealand (RMNZ)	Gold	15,000^{‡}
United States (RIAA)	Gold	500,000^{‡}
^{‡} Sales+streaming figures based on certification alone.
