= At. Long. Last. ASAP =

2015 studio album by ASAP Rocky

Studio album by ASAP Rocky
- Released: May 26, 2015
- Studios: Azari; Dean Street; Red Bull; Sarm West; Zelig (London); Clockwork; No Name; SlamHouse (Los Angeles); Downtown; Electric Lady; Germany; The Purple Palace (New York City); Mondo (Hollywood); Parkland Playhouse (Parkland)
- Genres: Hip-hop; psychedelic rap
- Length: 66:09
- Labels: ASAP; Polo Grounds; RCA
- Producers: ASAP Rocky; Che Pope; Danger Mouse; Da Honorable C.N.O.T.E.; Emile Haynie; FnZ; Frans Mernick; Hector Delgado; Jim Jonsin; Juicy J; Kanye West; Mark Ronson; Nez & Rio; Plu2o Nash; S.I.K.; Thelonious Martin; Vulkan the Krusader

ASAP Rocky chronology
Long. Live. ASAP (2013)	At. Long. Last. ASAP (2015)	Testing (2018)

10th anniversary re-release edition

Singles from At. Long. Last. ASAP
- 1. "Lord Pretty Flacko Jodye 2 (LPFJ2)" Released: January 7, 2015; 2. "Everyday" Released: May 8, 2015; 3. "LSD" Released: May 21, 2015

At. Long. Last. ASAP (stylized as AT.LONG.LAST.A$AP) is the second studio album by American rapper ASAP Rocky. It was released on May 26, 2015, by ASAP Worldwide, Polo Grounds Music, and RCA Records, and serves as a direct sequel to Rocky's previous studio effort, Long. Live. ASAP (2013). The project was executive produced by Danger Mouse, late mentor ASAP Yams and Rocky himself. Co-executive producers Hector Delgado and Juicy J contributed to the album's production, alongside Jim Jonsin, FnZ, Frans Mernick, Kanye West, Thelonious Martin, and Mark Ronson, among others. The album features guest appearances from West, Juicy J, Ronson, and Yams themselves, as well as Joe Fox, Rod Stewart, Lil Wayne, Future, Bones, M.I.A., Schoolboy Q, Miguel, and Mos Def, among others.

At. Long. Last. ASAP was supported by three singles: "Lord Pretty Flacko Jodye 2 (LPFJ2)", "Everyday", and "LSD". The album received generally positive reviews from critics and debuted at number one on the US Billboard 200. It is Rocky's second US number-one album. The album has been certified double platinum by the Recording Industry Association of America (RIAA).

== Background ==
People wanna hear bars, they wanna hear some music, they wanna hear me rapping. I was fortunate enough to be named after one of the greatest emcees of all time. That's like being named Michael Jordan or Magic Johnson to me, you get what I'm saying? Or Kobe Bryant or something like that. I was named after Rakim. I was intimidated because those shoes are too big to fulfill or walk in. I got to a point where I felt like I was 26 [and] I felt Rap was shit. I just hated Rap [in] 2014. I'm getting a headache thinking about it. I got to a point where I just was like, 'I need to do something about this shit.' This is the return of the God emcee, I'm talking some lord shit on this next album, At.Long.Last.A$AP. A-L-L-A. It's lit.

— ASAP Rocky, interviewed by CRWN in April 2015.

On March 16, 2014, announcements were made for two releases; including their first instrumental mixtape, Beauty and the Beast: Slowed Down Sessions (Chapter 1), and the ASAP Mob's collaborative album, L.O.R.D. ASAP Rocky revealed that he had been working on his second album. On September 26, 2014, ASAP Mob's founder ASAP Yams announced on his Tumblr account that the group scrapped the release for their collective's album, L.O.R.D., and instead named Rocky's second album as the label's next release. On October 2, 2014, Rocky announced that he signed a contract for worldwide representation with William Morris Endeavor.

On January 18, 2015, ASAP Rocky's mentor and business partner ASAP Yams died at the age of 26, which greatly affected the album's development. Upon ASAP Yams' death, Rocky revealed that his second album would be executive produced by himself and Yams, alongside rapper Juicy J, and record producer Danger Mouse; as well as collaborating with artists such as FKA Twigs and Lykke Li, with production by Clams Casino.

== Title ==
After performing at the 2015's South by Southwest (SXSW) festival, ASAP Rocky revealed to Billboard that the title to his second album would be A.L.L.A.. On March 26, 2015, in an interview with GQ, Rocky deciphered the album's title: "I'm claiming ownership of my legacy. Look at it: At.Long.Last.A$AP. A-L-L-A. Like slang for 'Allah.' It's the return of the god MC. I'm named after Rakim, and I'm finally facing what it means: I was born to do this shit. And I hope I get to do it for a very long time."

== Composition ==
Upon the release of the song "M's" (stylized "M'$"), Rocky revealed that he had also worked with New York City rapper Mos Def, as well as up-and-coming British musician Joe Fox (who is prominently featured on many tracks on the album). Hector Delgado and Rocky say that they met Joe Fox while roaming the streets of London: "I met the man. He was a street performer. [I met him in] London. I was at Dean's Studio until 4 a.m. I came outside and we waiting for our Uber to go to Starbucks, tired. This kid comes with his guitar and stuff. He was out there playing and stuff and he comes," Rocky explained of his first encounter with Fox. "It was about 4 a.m. so there's nobody in the streets. He tried to give me a CD and shit. I was like, 'I'm not about to listen to that, man. Play something. You got your guitar.' He played it and I was just like, 'Stop man. Come on let's go.' That's where it started."

== Release and promotion ==
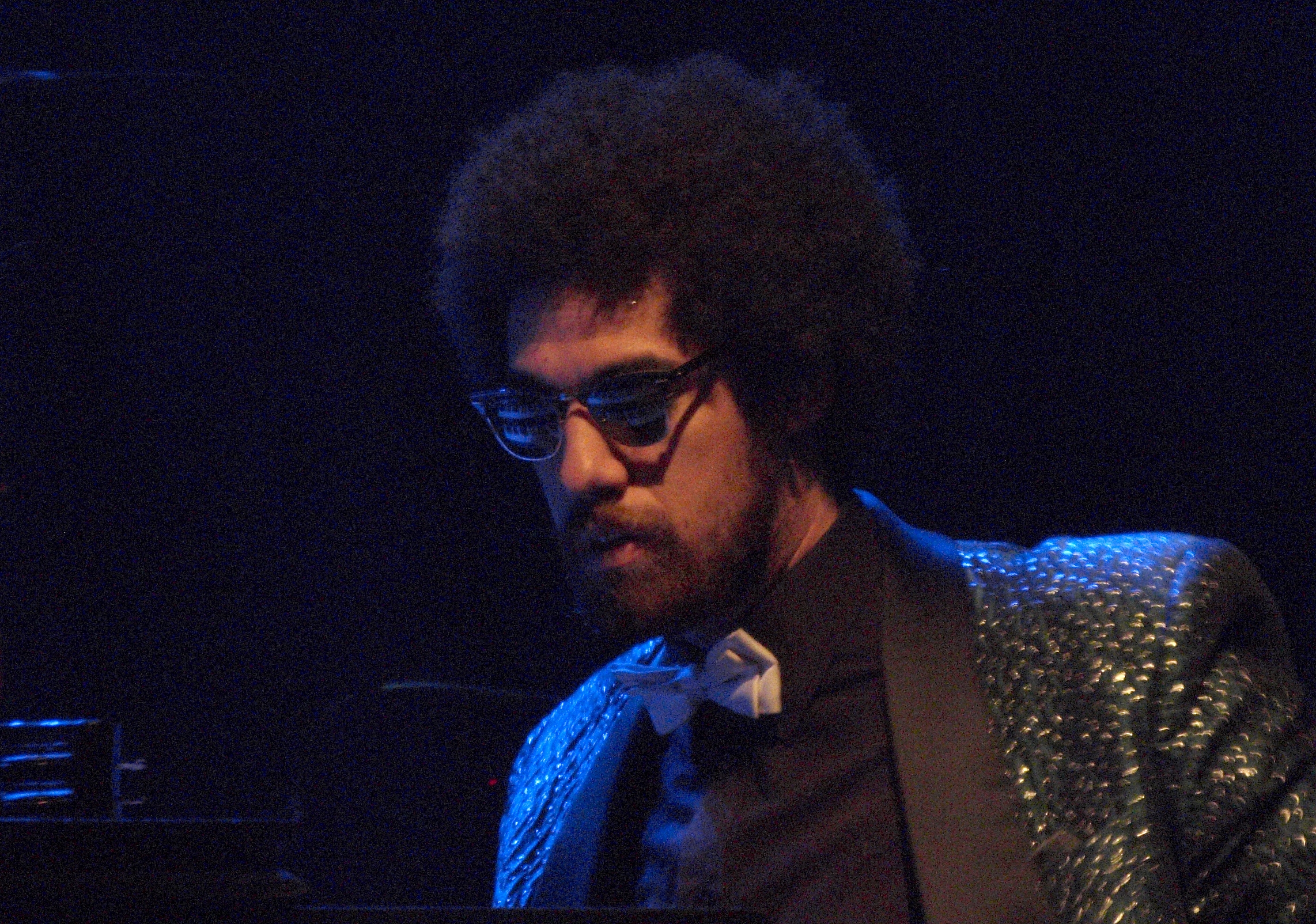
Danger Mouse served as an executive producer, and contributed production on several of the album's tracks.

On October 2, 2014, ASAP Yams and ASAP Rocky posted links to their website FlackoJodyeSeason.com, and then announced that Rocky's new single would be releasing at midnight. On October 3, Rocky released the album's promotional single, "Multiply" featuring Memphis-based rapper Juicy J. The song was accompanying by the music video (directed by ASAP Rocky and Shomi Patwary), which was officially released at midnight on the website, which had previously displayed a countdown timer. Upon the release, Rocky teased the release of his second studio album, which gave no further details.

On April 8, 2015, a song that was called "M's" debuted during Rocky's interview with the Red Bull Music Academy, and the song was released two days later on the iTunes Store. However, Rocky denounced the song as an official single from the album. The album version includes a re-worked version of the track, replacing Rocky's second verse, with a guest verse from New Orleans–based rapper Lil Wayne. On May 7, Rocky announced that the release date for the album is on June 2, 2015. On May 9, Rocky unveiled the album's cover art on his Instagram page, with the caption "AT LONG LAST...." On the same day, he also released the album's alternative artwork.

On May 25, 2015, the album was leaked online, approximately one week before its expected release. Rocky later tweeted to announce that the album had to be released at midnight, advancing the date to a week early. The album was released to digital retailers on May 26, 2015, by ASAP Worldwide, Polo Grounds Music and RCA Records. On August 30, Rocky performed "M's" and "LSD" at the 2015 MTV Video Music Awards.

== Singles ==
On January 7, 2015, ASAP Rocky released the album's lead single, titled "Lord Pretty Flacko Jodye 2 (LPFJ2)". The song was produced by the duo Nez & Rio. The music video, which was directed by Rocky, was released on February 11, 2015.

On May 8, 2015, Rocky released the album's second single, titled "Everyday". The track features guest appearances from musician Rod Stewart, American R&B recording artist Miguel, and Mark Ronson (who also produced the track as well, alongside Emile Haynie).

On May 19, 2015, Rocky released a music video for "LSD" (stylized "L$D", which stands for Love, $ex, Dream). The song was produced by Hector Delgado, Jim Jonsin and Finatik N Zac. The music video was directed by Dexter Navy. "LSD" was officially released as the album's third single on May 21, via digital distribution.

== Critical reception ==
Professional ratings
Aggregate scores
Source	Rating
AnyDecentMusic?	6.7/10
Metacritic	76/100
Review scores
Source	Rating
AllMusic	4/5 stars
The A.V. Club	B
The Daily Telegraph	4/5 stars
Entertainment Weekly	A−
The Guardian	4/5 stars
Mojo	3/5 stars
NME	8/10
Pitchfork	7.8/10
Rolling Stone	3.5/5 stars
Spin	7/10

At. Long. Last. ASAP was met with generally positive reviews. At Metacritic, which assigns a normalized rating out of 100 to reviews from professional publications, the album received an average score of 76, based on 33 reviews. Aggregator AnyDecentMusic? gave it 6.7 out of 10, based on their assessment of the critical consensus.

In The Daily Telegraph, Neil McCormick called it a "big, bold, madly ambitious album" on which Rocky "made a frequently dazzling spectacle, another reminder that hip hop is currently setting the bar very high indeed". Jon Caramanica of The New York Times said the rapper "doesn't absorb and repurpose his guests' styles. He's fully formed, a rapper who understands his talent in relation to that of his peers and that of his influences, unafraid of showing you his blueprint". Alex Denney of NME said, "Playground misogyny aside, ALLA is a thrillingly focused follow-up that betrays its anxieties even as it mostly makes do with extolling the virtues of vice". Jon Dolan from Rolling Stone credited the producers for sustaining the album's "expensive vibe" with "a sound that's at once tough and transporting — from the gospel-steeped 'Holy Ghost' to the interplanetary ass-shaker 'Electric Body' to the Rod Stewart-sampling soul fantasia 'Everyday' (featuring Miguel). Even at his trippiest, Rocky makes sure things never swirl off in a haze of incense and peppermints, with steely lyrics that often focus on inescapable truths". Ben Thomas of The Guardian said, "Some might call it retrograde in the year of To Pimp a Butterfly, but rap is big enough to contain multitudes – including self-regard when it's this perfectly delivered".

Rebecca Haithcoat was less impressed in Spin, highlighting the upbeat production of "LSD", "Excuse Me", and "Westside Highway", but finding the rest of the record often "despondent". Jonathan Hatchman of Clash said, "As a collected body of work At.Long.Last.A$AP is far from dreadful, but taken as a whole it lacks the elements of depth and star quality that—having set the bar incredibly high with his debut—many expect from A$AP Rocky". Mojo reviewer Andy Cowan gave it a lukewarm assessment, writing that while "there are few lyrical miracles in these scattershot songs obsessed with sex, drugs and shopping, in this intuitive stylist's mouth the words themselves are often beside the point". Brooklyn Russell of Pretty Much Amazing said, "Even if we were to give ALLA's abysmal lyrics a pass, the production doesn't help, either.... Still, Rocky can, at times, be an engaging figure that radiates charisma when he wants".

=== Year-end lists ===
Select year-end rankings of At. Long. Last. ASAP
Publication	List	Rank	Ref.
Consequence	Top 50 Albums of 2015	45	
Entertainment Weekly	The 40 Best Albums of 2015	5	
Fuse	The 20 Best Albums of 2015	14	
NME	NME's Albums of the Year 2015	12	
Noisey	The 50 Best Albums of 2015	30	
Spin	The 50 Best Hip-Hop Albums of 2015	16	
Time Out	The 25 Best Albums of 2015	6	

== Commercial performance ==
At. Long. Last. ASAP debuted at number one on the US Billboard 200 with 146,000 album-equivalent units, of which 117,000 were pure album sales. In conclusion to this, it also gave Rocky his second consecutive number one album on the charts to date. In Canada, the album debuted at number one, with 11,000 copies sold. The album spent two more weeks in the top ten of the Billboard 200. As of July 2015, the album has sold 215,000 copies in the United States.

Additionally, At. Long. Last. ASAP also spent four weeks at number one on the US Top R&B/Hip-Hop Albums from June 13 – July 4, before singer Leon Bridges' debut album, Coming Home, dethroned the album's run at the top slot. Also, as the R&B/Hip-Hop Albums chart's distillation, A.L.L.A. stayed at the top slot on the US Rap Albums chart for a total of five nonconsecutive weeks (between June 13 – July 11), before being dethroned by rapper Meek Mill's second studio album, Dreams Worth More Than Money, which also debuted at number one on the Billboard 200, giving Meek Mill his first number one album to date as well. On May 26, 2025, the album has been certified double platinum by the Recording Industry Association of America (RIAA) for achieving over two million album-equivalent units.

== Track listing ==
Credits adapted from album's liner notes.

At. Long. Last. ASAP track listing
No.	Title	Writer(s)	Producer(s)	Length
1.	"Holy Ghost" (featuring Joe Fox)	Rakim Mayers; Brian Burton; Joe Fox; Ben Nichols	Danger Mouse; DJ Khalil^{[b]}	3:11
2.	"Canal St." (featuring Bones)	Mayers; Frans Mernick; Hector Delgado; Elmo O'Connor	Delgado; Mernick; ASAP Rocky	3:47
3.	"Fine Whine" (featuring Future, Joe Fox and M.I.A.)	Mayers; Rameses Magnus-George; Axel Morgan; Ricci Riera; Nayvadius Wilburn	S.I.K.; THC^{[b]}	3:38
4.	"LSD"	Mayers; James Scheffer; Michael Mule; Issac de Boni; Michael Burman; Delgado; Bobbie Gentry	Jim Jonsin; FnZ; Delgado^{[a]}; ASAP Rocky^{[a]}	3:58
5.	"Excuse Me"	Mayers; Scheffer; Mule; de Boni; Delgado; Kim Gannon; Walter Kent; Buck Ram	Delgado; ASAP Rocky; Vulkan the Krusader; Jim Jonsin; FnZ	3:58
6.	"JD"	Mayers; Malcolm Lawson-Stribling	Plu2o Nash	1:48
7.	"Lord Pretty Flacko Jodye 2 (LPFJ2)"	Mayers; Mario Loving; Nesbitt Wesonga	Loving; Wesonga	2:07
8.	"Electric Body" (featuring Schoolboy Q)	Mayers; Delgado; Burton; Teddy Walton; Quincey Hanley; Edwin Perez; David Colquit	Delgado; Danger Mouse^{[b]}; Walton^{[b]}; THC^{[b]}	4:15
9.	"Jukebox Joints" (featuring Joe Fox and Kanye West)	Mayers; Che Pope; Kanye West; Fox; Dicky Sulaksono; Warren Moore; William Robinson	Pope; West	5:24
10.	"Max B" (featuring Joe Fox)	Mayers; Delgado; Fox; Leonard Cohen	Delgado; ASAP Rocky	4:01
11.	"Pharsyde" (featuring Joe Fox)	Mayers; Burton; Fox	Danger Mouse	3:42
12.	"Wavybone" (featuring Juicy J and UGK)	Mayers; Jordan Houston; Chad "Pimp C" Butler; Bernard "Bun B" Freeman; Delgado; Willie Mitchell; Yvonne Mitchell; Lawrence Seymore; Earl Randle	Juicy J; Delgado^{[b]}	5:03
13.	"West Side Highway" (featuring James Fauntleroy)	Mayers; Burton; James Fauntleroy	Danger Mouse	2:57
14.	"Better Things"	Mayers; Mernick; Zachary Yudin; Eric Michael Cardona; Gabel Mullen D'Amico; Udbhay Gupta; Andrea Estella Hernandez; Bryan Matthew Ujueta; Bobby Caldwell; Lowell Fulsom; Senen Reyes; Louis Freeze; Larry Muggerud	Mernick	3:19
15.	"M's" (featuring Lil Wayne)	Mayers; Carlton Mays, Jr.; Mike Dean; Dwayne Carter	Da Honorable C.N.O.T.E.; Dean^{[a]}	3:53
16.	"Dreams (Interlude)"	Mayers; Mernick; Daniel Lynas; Alex Dadras; Naja Rosa; Anders Holm	ASAP Rocky; Mernick	2:17
17.	"Everyday" (featuring Rod Stewart, Miguel and Mark Ronson)	Mayers; Mark Ronson; Miguel Pimentel; David Keith Bentley	Ronson; Emile Haynie; Jeff Bhasker^{[b]}; Hudson Mohawke^{[b]}; ASAP Rocky^{[b]}; Mernick^{[b]}; Tom Elmhirst^{[b]}	4:21
18.	"Back Home" (featuring Mos Def, Acyde and ASAP Yams)	Mayers; Malcolm Martin; Darryl Damien Washington; Dante Smith; Melvin Steals; Mervin Steals	Thelonious Martin; DDot Omen^{[a]}; ASAP Rocky^{[a]}	4:38
Total length:				66:09

Japanese version bonus tracks
No.	Title	Writer(s)	Producer(s)	Length
19.	"Multiply" (featuring Juicy J)	Mayers; Houston	Curtis Heron	3:43
20.	"M's"	Mayers; Dean; Mays, Jr.	Honorable C.N.O.T.E.; Dean^{[a]}	3:38
Total length:				73:30

Track notes

- ^{^[a]} indicates a co-producer
- ^{^[b]} indicates an additional producer
- Every featured artist is separated by an "x" in place of commas and an ampersand
- "LSD" features additional vocals by Joe Fox
- "Electric Body" features additional vocals by Joe Fox, King Kanobby and Theola "Theezy" Borden
- "Westside Highway" features background vocals by Christina Milian
- "M's" features additional vocals by 2 Chainz
- "Everyday" features additional vocals by Yasiin Bey
- "Back Home" features additional vocals by Anthony Pavel

Sample credits

- "Holy Ghost" contains a sample of "Noon as Dark as Midnight", performed by Lucero.
- "Canal St." contains a sample of "Dirt", written and performed by Bones.
- "LSD" contains a sample of "Ode to Billie Joe" (1967), performed by Lou Donaldson.
- "Excuse Me" contains a sample of "Come Home for Christmas" (Incorrectly credited as "I'll Be Home for Christmas"), performed by The Platters.
- "Electric Body" contains a portion of the composition "Shake That Ass", written by Edwin Perez and David Colquit, and performed by Tapp.
- "Jukebox Joints" contains samples of "Doa Tuk Kekashih", performed by Rasela; "Much Better Off", performed by Smokey Robinson and The Miracles; and "Who Cares", performed by Tony Aiken and Future 2000.
- "Max B" contains samples of "Who by Fire", written and performed by Leonard Cohen; and "Take Me to the Mardi Grass", performed by Bob James.
- "Wavybone" contains samples of "Heaven and Hell", performed by El Michels Affair; and "Could I Be Falling In Love", performed by Syl Johnson.
- "Better Things" contains samples of "Carry On", written and performed by Bobby Caldwell; "All Around and Away We Go", performed by Mr Twin Sister; "High School Lover", performed by Cayucas; and also contains a portion of "How I Could Just Kill a Man", performed by Cypress Hill.
- "Dreams (Interlude)" contains a sample of "Stuck In The Middle", written and performed by Naja Rosa and Anders Holm.
- "Everyday" contains a sample of "In a Broken Dream", performed by Python Lee Jackson and Rod Stewart.
- "Back Home" contains a sample of "Gotta Find My Way Back Home", performed by The Jaggerz.

== Personnel ==
Credits are adapted from AllMusic.

- ASAP Yams – featured artist
- A-Cyde – featured artist, vocals
- Derek "MixedByAli" Ali – mixing
- Angel "Onhel" Apontel – vocals
- Beatriz Artola – assistant, engineer, mixing
- ASAP Rocky – additional production, executive producer, primary artist, producer
- Dan Auerbach – guitar
- Awge – design, executive producer
- Victor Axelrod – keyboards
- Yasiin Bey – vocals
- Jeff Bhasker – additional production
- Bones – featured artist
- Theola Borden – vocals
- Nathan Burgess – assistant
- Michael Burman – guitar
- Austen Jux Chandler – engineer
- Maddox Chhim – assistant
- Da Honorable C.N.O.T.E. – producer
- Riccardo Damian – engineer
- Danger Mouse – additional production, executive producer, producer
- DDot Omen – producer
- Mike Dean – mixing, producer
- Hector Delgado – additional production, arranger, editing, engineer, executive producer, keyboards, mixing, producer, programming
- DJ Khalil – additional production
- Rhys Downing – engineer
- Pablo Dylan – assistant
- Tom Elmhirst – additional production
- Max Ervin – assistant
- James Fauntleroy – featured artist
- FnZ – keyboards, producer, programming
- Joe Fox – featured artist, guitar, vocals
- Future – featured artist
- Dan Fyfe – assistant
- Noah Goldstein – engineer
- Emile Haynie – drum programming, producer
- Hudson Mohawke – additional production
- James Hunt – assistant
- Jaycen Joshua – mixing
- Chace Johnson – executive producer
- Jim Jonsin – keyboards, producer, programming
- Juicy J – executive producer, featured artist, producer
- King Kanobby – vocals
- Ryan Kaul – assistant
- Kennie Takahashi – mixing
- Dave Kutch – mastering
- Michele Lamy – art direction
- Carter Lang – bass
- Bryan Leach – executive producer
- Lil Wayne – featured artist
- Mario Loving – producer
- Thelonious Martin – producer
- Nikolas Marzouca – engineer
- Rakim Mayers – producer
- Frans Mernick – additional production, drum programming, engineer, producer
- M.I.A. – featured artist
- Miguel – engineer, featured artist
- Christina Milian – background vocals
- Will Miller – trumpet
- Todd Monfalcone – assistant, assistant engineer, engineer, mixing assistant
- Mos Def – featured artist
- Dexter Navy – photography
- Anthony Pavel – vocals
- Plu2o Nash – producer
- Che Pope – producer
- Rebel Rock – producer
- Dana Richard – assistant
- Steven "A$AP Yams" Rodriguez – executive producer
- Mark Ronson – bass, drum programming, engineer, featured artist, keyboards, producer
- Matt Schafer – assistant
- Jason Schweitzer – mixing
- S.I.K. – producer
- Jason Staniulis – engineer
- Rod Stewart – featured artist
- THC – additional production
- UGK – featured artist
- Tom Upex – assistant
- Vulkan the Krusader – producer
- Teddy Walton – additional production
- Taheed Watson – assistant, assistant engineer, mixing assistant
- Nesbitt Wesonga – producer
- Kanye West – featured artist, producer
- Kenta Yonesaka – engineer

== Charts ==
=== Weekly charts ===
2015 chart performance for At. Long. Last. ASAP
Chart (2015)	Peak position
Australian Albums (ARIA)	5
Austrian Albums (Ö3 Austria)	29
Belgian Albums (Ultratop Flanders)	30
Belgian Albums (Ultratop Wallonia)	48
Canadian Albums (Billboard)	1
Danish Albums (Hitlisten)	4
Dutch Albums (Album Top 100)	46
Finnish Albums (Suomen virallinen lista)	8
French Albums (SNEP)	42
German Albums (Offizielle Top 100)	28
Hungarian Albums (MAHASZ)	32
Italian Albums (FIMI)	69
New Zealand Albums (RMNZ)	6
Norwegian Albums (VG-lista)	5
Polish Albums (ZPAV)	22
Swedish Albums (Sverigetopplistan)	10
Swiss Albums (Schweizer Hitparade)	5
UK Albums (Official Charts)	10
UK R&B Albums (Official Charts)	1
US Billboard 200	1
US Top R&B/Hip-Hop Albums (Billboard)	1

2017 chart performance for At. Long. Last. ASAP
Chart (2017)	Peak position
Latvian Albums (LaIPA)	88

=== Year-end charts ===
2015 year-end chart performance for At. Long. Last. ASAP
Chart (2015)	Position
Australian Albums (ARIA)	100
US Billboard 200	56
US Top R&B/Hip-Hop Albums (Billboard)	14

2016 year-end chart performance for At. Long. Last. ASAP
Chart (2016)	Position
US Billboard 200	142
US Top R&B/Hip-Hop Albums (Billboard)	83

== Certifications ==
Certifications and sales for At. Long. Last. ASAP
Region	Certification	Certified units/sales
Australia (ARIA)	Gold	35,000^{‡}
Canada (Music Canada)	Platinum	80,000^{‡}
Denmark (IFPI Danmark)	Platinum	20,000^{‡}
Germany (BVMI)	Gold	100,000^{‡}
Poland (ZPAV)	Platinum	20,000^{‡}
United Kingdom (BPI)	Gold	100,000^{‡}
United States (RIAA)	2× Platinum	2,000,000^{‡}
^{‡} Sales+streaming figures based on certification alone.

== See also ==
- List of UK R&B Albums Chart number ones of 2015
- List of Billboard 200 number-one albums of 2015
- List of Billboard number-one R&B/hip-hop albums of 2015
