= Lord Pretty Flacko Jodye 2 (LPFJ2) =

2015 single by ASAP Rocky

Single by ASAP Rocky

from the album At. Long. Last. ASAP
- B-side: "Multiply"
- Released: January 7, 2015
- Recorded: 2014
- Genre: Trap
- Length: 2:07
- Label: Polo Grounds; RCA
- Songwriters: Rakim Mayers; Mario Loving; Nesbitt Wesonga
- Producer: Nez & Rio

ASAP Rocky singles chronology
"Multiply" (2014)	"Lord Pretty Flacko Jodye 2 (LPFJ2)" (2015)	"Everyday" (2015)

Music video
- "Lord Pretty Flacko Jodye 2" on YouTube

"Lord Pretty Flacko Jodye 2 (LPFJ2)" is a song by the American rapper ASAP Rocky. It was released on January 7, 2015, as the first official single from his second studio album, At. Long. Last. ASAP (2015). ASAP Rocky wrote the track alongside production duo Nez & Rio, who were responsible for producing the song as well. An accompanying music video for the track, directed by Samantha Lecca was released on February 10.

The song serves as a sequel to the song "Pretty Flacko", which ASAP Rocky had previously released in 2013.

== Background and release ==
"Lord Pretty Flacko Jodye 2 (LPFJ2)" was first previewed at the end of the music video for ASAP Rocky's previous single, "Multiply" (2014). Following a performance of the track during a show at London in November 2014, ASAP Rocky announced that he was planning to release the song. According to HotNewHipHop, the song quickly became anticipated among fan circles, with a YouTube video of the snippet "racking up a ton of views".

"Lord Pretty Flacko Jodye 2 (LPFJ2)" was released as a white 7" vinyl record on April 18, 2015, to coincide with that year's Record Store Day. Limited to 2500 copies, the record also included ASAP Rocky's previous single, "Multiply", as its B-side.

== Composition ==
Ryan Reed of Rolling Stone found the track's production to be minimalist, describing it as "little more than a squealing synth lead, sub-bass drone and snapping hi-hat/snare". ASAP Rocky's lyrics feature him "confidently reminding listeners" who he is, which is scord with a "booming synth and bass ensemble" provided by Nez & Rio.

== Music video ==
The music video for "Lord Pretty Flacko Jodye 2 (LPFJ2)", directed by Samantha Lecca, was released on February 10, 2015. Its visuals have been described as "lo-fi" and "kaleidoscopic" by multiple publications, the former description being used by ASAP Rocky himself to describe the video. ASAP Rocky and his ASAP Mob group are seen partying at a variety of locations in New York City, such as a street corner and a laundromat. ASAP Rocky is projected onto various buildings in the video, playing shadow puppets on the side of a building and posing in front of a green screen The video ends with a dedication to the late ASAP Yams, founder of ASAP Mob and mentor to ASAP Rocky, who had died a month prior, reading: "Always strive and prosper. Rest in peace A$AP Yams." Much like how "Lord Pretty Flacko Jodye 2 (LPFJ2)" was previewed towards the end of the music video for "Multiply", an at-the-time unreleased song and music video starts to play at the end, which was later released as the song "M's".

In the hour prior to the debut of the song's music video, ASAP Rocky did a fan Q&A on the social media platform Tumblr. Commenting on the video, ASAP Rocky stated that he "wanted to make a fun lo-fi video using projectors and showcasing that fun energy", in reference to the various NYC spots shown in the video. In addition to giving out multiple other answers, many of which were unrelated to his music, ASAP Rocky gave insight into the current state of At. Long. Last. ASAP at the time, calling the album his "best work yet" and revealing the initials "A.L.L.A." for its title.

== Charts ==
Chart (2015)	Peak position
US Bubbling Under Hot 100 (Billboard)	1
US Hot R&B/Hip-Hop Songs (Billboard)	37

== Certifications ==
Region	Certification	Certified units/sales
Canada (Music Canada)	Platinum	80,000^{‡}
New Zealand (RMNZ)	Platinum	30,000^{‡}
Poland (ZPAV)	Gold	25,000^{‡}
United Kingdom (BPI)	Silver	200,000^{‡}
United States (RIAA)	3× Platinum	3,000,000^{‡}
^{‡} Sales+streaming figures based on certification alone.
