= Everyday (ASAP Rocky song) =

Single by ASAP Rocky featuring Rod Stewart, Miguel and Mark Ronson

from the album At. Long. Last. ASAP
- Released: May 8, 2015
- Recorded: 2015
- Genre: Alternative hip hop; cloud rap
- Length: 4:21
- Label: A$AP Worldwide; Polo Grounds; RCA
- Songwriters: David Bentley; Mark Ronson; Rakim Mayers; Frans Mernick
- Producers: Mark Ronson; Emile Haynie; Frans Mernick (add.); Jeff Bhasker (add.); LORD FLACKO (add.); Tom Elmhirst (add.); Hudson Mohawke (add.)

ASAP Rocky singles chronology
"Lord Pretty Flacko Jodye 2 (LPFJ2)" (2015)	"Everyday" (2015)	"L$D" (2015)

Rod Stewart singles chronology
"Can't Stop Me Now" (2013)	"Everyday" (2015)	"Love Is" (2015)

Miguel singles chronology
"Coffee" (2015)	"Everyday" (2015)	"Weekend" (2016)

Mark Ronson singles chronology
"Feel Right" (2015)	"Everyday" (2015)	"Diamonds Are Invincible" (2018)

"Everyday" is a song by American rapper ASAP Rocky. It was released through RCA Records on May 8, 2015, as the second single from his second studio album, At. Long. Last. ASAP (2015). It features English singer Rod Stewart, American singer Miguel, and English record producer Mark Ronson. Its production, handled by Ronson and Emile Haynie, incorporates a vocal sample of Python Lee Jackson and Stewart's 1970 song "In a Broken Dream"; in addition to the sampled performance, Stewart himself recorded new vocals for "Everyday".

"Everyday" peaked at number 92 on the Billboard Hot 100. Critically acclaimed, Rolling Stone ranked "Everyday" at number 38 on its annual year-end list to find the best songs of 2015.

== Charts ==
Chart (2015)	Peak position
Australia (ARIA)	49
Canada Hot 100 (Billboard)	87
France (SNEP)	192
Ireland (IRMA)	92
Sweden (Sverigetopplistan)	86
UK Singles (Official Charts)	56
US Billboard Hot 100	92
US Hot R&B/Hip-Hop Songs (Billboard)	31
US Hot Rap Songs (Billboard)	23

Chart (2026)	Peak position
Greece International (IFPI)	82

== Certifications ==
Region	Certification	Certified units/sales
Australia (ARIA)	Platinum	70,000^{‡}
Canada (Music Canada)	2× Platinum	160,000^{‡}
Denmark (IFPI Danmark)	Platinum	90,000^{‡}
Germany (BVMI)	Gold	200,000^{‡}
Italy (FIMI)	Gold	35,000^{‡}
New Zealand (RMNZ)	3× Platinum	90,000^{‡}
Poland (ZPAV)	Platinum	50,000^{‡}
Portugal (AFP)	2× Platinum	40,000^{‡}
United Kingdom (BPI)	Platinum	600,000^{‡}
United States (RIAA)	2× Platinum	2,000,000^{‡}
Streaming
Greece (IFPI Greece)	Platinum	2,000,000^{†}
^{‡} Sales+streaming figures based on certification alone.^{†} Streaming-only figures based on certification alone.

== Release history ==
Country	Date	Format	Label
United States	May 8, 2015	Digital download	A$AP Worldwide; Polo Grounds; RCA
