= Kronobergshäktet =

Prison in Stockholm, Sweden

Coordinates: 59°19′50.67″N 18°2′19.68″E

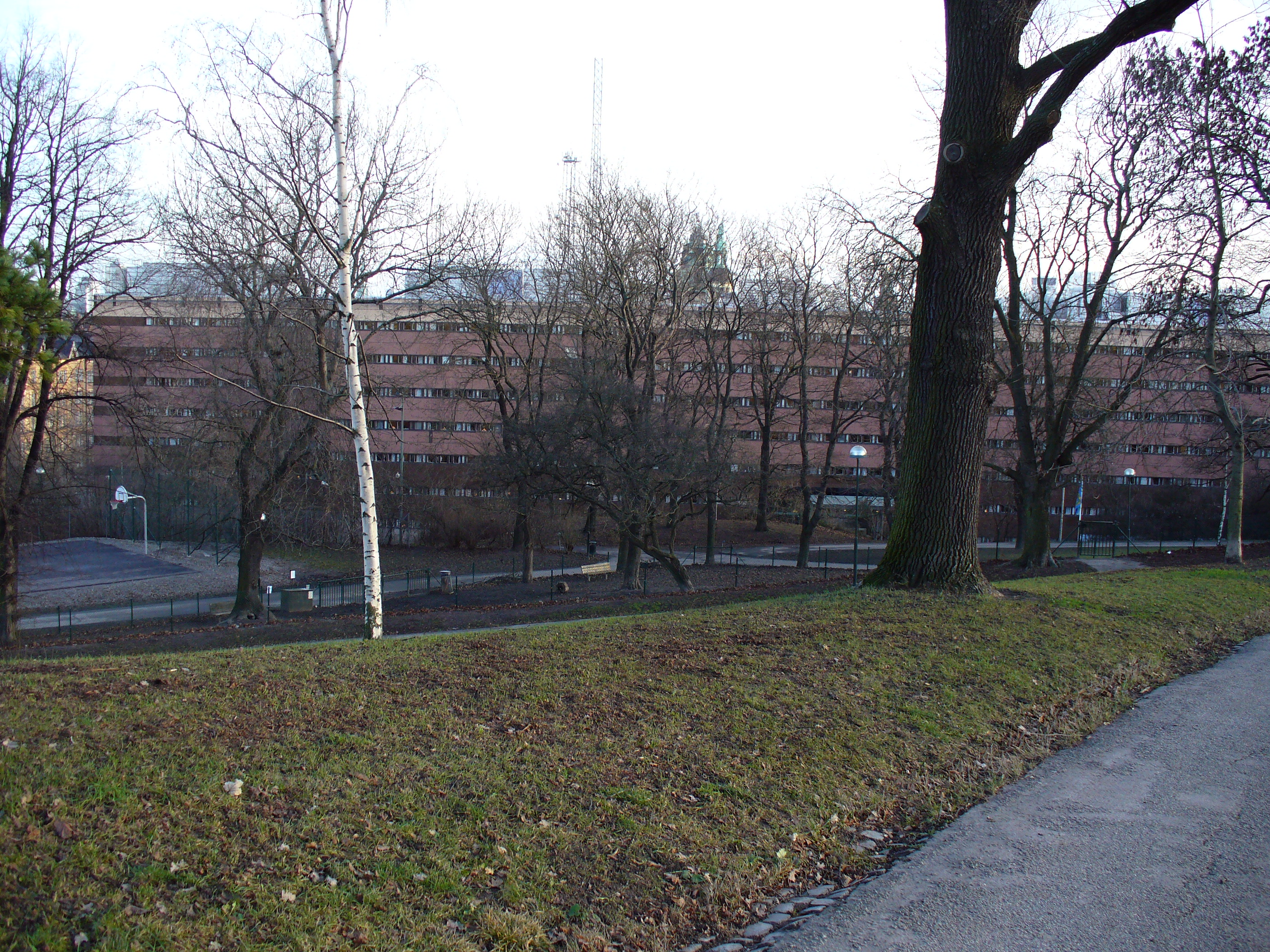
Kronoberg prison seen from Kronoberg Park

Kronobergshäktet (Kronoberg remand prison) is the largest remand prison in Sweden, with a capacity of circa 372 inmates. It's located the block Kronoberg on Kungsholmen in Stockholm.

== Notable inmates ==
- ASAP Rocky – arrested for assault in early July 2019 and remanded in custody at Kronobergshäktet.
