= Chase's Calendar of Events =

Annual American publication

Chase's Calendar of Events is an annual American publication, started in 1957 by brothers William (Bill) D. Chase (a journalist and publisher from Michigan), and Harrison V. Chase (a university social scientist from Florida). It includes special events, holidays, federal and state observances, historic anniversaries, and more unusual celebratory traditions. Bill Chase worked as a newspaper librarian and saw a need for "a single reference source for calendar dates, and for authoritative and current information about various observances throughout the year".

The brothers gathered information on events and the first edition of 2,000 copies was printed for 1958. "It was 32 pages, contained 364 entries and sold for $1", while recent editions are 752 pages and contain more than 12,000 entries including National Nothing Day. A promotion sponsored by the US Chamber of Commerce was added in 1958: a pamphlet listed commercial promotions as Special Days, Weeks and Months, and remained in future editions. Contemporary Books in Chicago, Illinois, took over publication in 1983 and the Chases retired in 1987 from compiling the calendar, which is now handled by an in-house staff of editors and researchers. Contemporary Books was acquired by Tribune in 1993 and sold to McGraw-Hill Companies in September 2000. McGraw-Hill sold the property to Rowman and Littlefield Publishing Group in January 2015, where it is now published by Bernan Press, an imprint of RLPG.

== Sections ==
Sections of the calendar include

- Astronomical Phenomena
- Religious Observances
- National and International Observances and Civic Holidays
- Special Days, Weeks and Months
- Presidential Proclamations
- Events and Festivals
- Anniversaries
- Birthdays Today
