= Honorable C.N.O.T.E. =

American record producer and songwriter (born 1981)

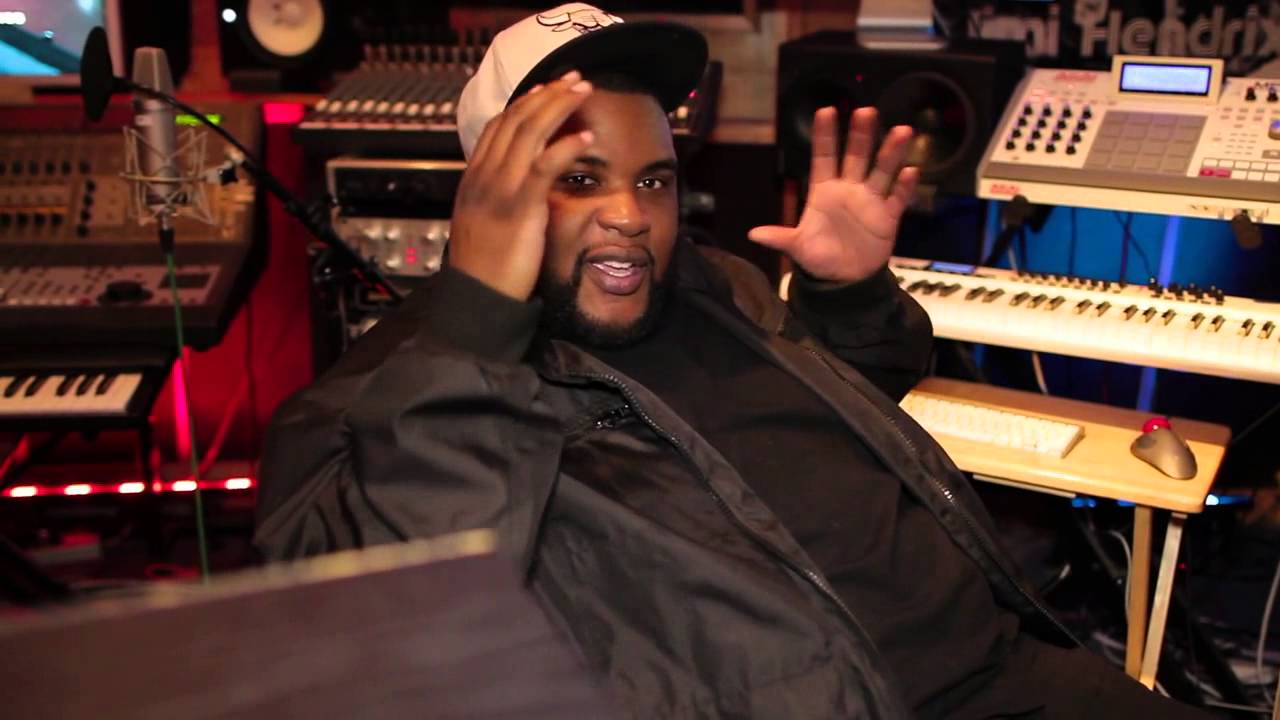
- Mays in 2013

Background information
- Also known as: Da Honorable C.N.O.T.E.; C-Note
- Born: Carlton Davis Mays Jr. April 8, 1981 (age 45); Benton Harbor, Michigan, U.S.
- Origin: Atlanta, Georgia, U.S.
- Genre: Hip-hop
- Occupations: Record producer; songwriter
- Instrument: Sampler
- Years active: 2007–present
- Label: 1017

Carlton Davis Mays Jr. (born April 8, 1981), known professionally as Honorable C.N.O.T.E., is an American hip-hop record producer and songwriter.

== Career ==
Mays started producing at the age of 15 in the Benton Harbor Area of Michigan, before moving to Atlanta in 2006. He has over 7,000 placements on albums and is best known for producing "New Level" by rapper ASAP Ferg, as well as the song "M'$" by rapper ASAP Rocky. Mays has also produced several tracks for various artists such as 2 Chainz, Migos, Ne-Yo, Flo Rida, Gucci Mane, Travis Scott, Yo Gotti, Future, Meek Mill, Lil Uzi Vert and Trippie Redd among others.
