= 2015 MTV Video Music Awards =

Award ceremony

- Date: Sunday, August 30, 2015
- Venue: Microsoft Theater (Los Angeles, California)
- Country: United States
- Hosted by: Miley Cyrus

Highlights
- Most awards: Taylor Swift (4)
- Most nominations: Taylor Swift (10)
- Website: www.mtv.com/vma/2015/

Television/radio coverage
- Network: MTV; MTV2; VH1; VH1 Classic; Logo TV; BET; Centric; Comedy Central; TV Land; CMT
- Runtime: 190 minutes
- Produced by: Amy Doyle; Jesse Ignjatovic; Dave Sirulnick; Van Toffler
- Directed by: Hamish Hamilton

The 2015 MTV Video Music Awards were held on August 30, 2015. The 32nd installment of the event was held at the Microsoft Theater in Los Angeles, California, and hosted by Miley Cyrus. Taylor Swift led the nominations with a total of ten, followed by Ed Sheeran, who had six, (Note: Another nominee, Kendrick Lamar, received four nominations for his video "Alright." The videos for Swift's "Bad Blood" and Flying Lotus' "Never Catch Me" (both of which he features on) earned seven and two nominations respectively—however, those are not counted since he is not the lead artist.) bringing his total number of mentions to 13. Swift's "Wildest Dreams" music video premiered during the pre-show. Cyrus also announced and released her studio album Miley Cyrus & Her Dead Petz, right after her performance at the end of the show. During his acceptance speech, Kanye West announced that he would be running in the 2020 United States presidential election. Taylor Swift won the most awards with four, including Video of the Year and Best Female Video. The VMA trophies were redesigned by Jeremy Scott.

This 2015 edition was seen by 9.8 million people in the United States during its simulcast across ten Viacom-owned networks. However, the ceremony's airing on the flagship MTV network alone had one of the lowest audience in the ceremony's 31-year history (with the following year's ceremony being the lowest of all time). According to Nielsen, it logged 5.03 million viewers on MTV, 39% less than the previous year, while cumulative viewers drew 9.8 million with the nine other simulcasting networks. The lowest viewed edition since Nielson began tracking in 1994 was in 1996, with 5.07 million viewers. This broadcast, however, broke the "US Twitter record", being the most tweeted about non-sports program, with 21.4 million tweets delivered by 2.2 million people. It was also streamed live through the MTV app for authenticated users on mobile devices and television sets via iOS, Android and Chromecast. Through its website, viewers could also get to see un-aired audience shots and backstage coverage. mtvU aired a behind-the-scenes feed and MTV Hits went dark.

== Performances ==
Artist(s)	Song(s)
Pre-show
Walk the Moon	"Shut Up and Dance" "Different Colors"
Todrick Hall	Video of the Year nominees' covers ("Uptown Funk", "7/11", "Bad Blood")
Nick Jonas	"Levels"
Main show
Nicki Minaj; Taylor Swift	"Trini Dem Girls" (Minaj) "The Night Is Still Young" "Bad Blood"
Macklemore & Ryan Lewis; Eric Nally; Melle Mel; Kool Moe Dee; Grandmaster Caz	"Downtown" (Live from outside The Orpheum Theatre)
The Weeknd	"Can't Feel My Face"
Demi Lovato; Iggy Azalea	"Cool for the Summer" (Live from outside The Orpheum Theatre)
Justin Bieber	"Where Are Ü Now" "What Do You Mean?"
Tori Kelly	"Should've Been Us"
Pharrell Williams	"Freedom" (Live from outside The Orpheum Theatre)
Twenty One Pilots; ASAP Rocky	"Heavydirtysoul" "M's" "Message Man" "Lane Boy" "LSD"
Miley Cyrus	"Dooo It!"

== Presenters ==
=== Pre-show ===
- Sway and Kelly Osbourne – hosts
- Kelly Osbourne and Jeremy Scott – presented Best Rock Video
- Carly Aquilino, Charlamagne Tha God, and Vic Mensa – presented Best Pop Video
- Awkwafina and Nessa – presented Song of Summer

=== Main show ===
- Nicki Minaj – introduced Macklemore & Ryan Lewis
- Ike Barinholtz and Andy Samberg – appeared in a pre-taped skit with host Miley Cyrus
- Britney Spears – presented Best Male Video
- Jared Leto – introduced The Weeknd
- Rebel Wilson – presented Best Hip-Hop Video
- Tyga, Juicy J, Mike Will Made It and Billy Ray Cyrus – appeared in a pre-taped skit with host Miley Cyrus
- Big Sean and Nick Jonas – presented Best Female Video
- Hailee Steinfeld – introduced Demi Lovato outside The Orpheum Theatre
- Serayah and Jussie Smollett – presented Best Video with a Social Message
- Ne-Yo and Kylie Jenner – introduced Tori Kelly
- Taylor Swift – presented Video Vanguard Award
- John Legend – introduced Pharrell Williams outside The Orpheum Theatre
- Rita Ora and Emily Ratajkowski – presented Artist to Watch
- Miguel and Gigi Hadid – introduced Twenty One Pilots and ASAP Rocky
- Ice Cube and O'Shea Jackson, Jr. – presented Video of the Year
- Happy Hippie Foundation members – introduced Miley Cyrus

== Winners and nominees ==
The nominations were announced on July 21, 2015 via Apple Music's Beats 1. Nominees for the social media-driven category, Song of Summer, were announced on August 18, 2015. Taylor Swift and Kendrick Lamar were tied with most nominations, 10. Ed Sheeran had 6, Nicki Minaj had 4.

Video of the Year	Best Male Video
Taylor Swift (featuring Kendrick Lamar) – "Bad Blood"; Beyoncé – "7/11"; Kendrick Lamar – "Alright"; Mark Ronson (featuring Bruno Mars) – "Uptown Funk"; Ed Sheeran – "Thinking Out Loud"	Mark Ronson (featuring Bruno Mars) – "Uptown Funk"; Nick Jonas – "Chains"; Kendrick Lamar - "Alright"; Ed Sheeran – "Thinking Out Loud"; The Weeknd – "Earned It"
Best Female Video	Artist to Watch
Taylor Swift – "Blank Space"; Beyoncé – "7/11"; Ellie Goulding – "Love Me Like You Do"; Nicki Minaj – "Anaconda"; Sia – "Elastic Heart"	Fetty Wap – "Trap Queen"; James Bay – "Hold Back the River"; George Ezra – "Budapest"; FKA Twigs – "Pendulum"; Vance Joy – "Riptide"
Best Pop Video	Best Rock Video
Taylor Swift – "Blank Space"; Beyoncé – "7/11"; Maroon 5 – "Sugar"; Mark Ronson (featuring Bruno Mars) – "Uptown Funk"; Ed Sheeran – "Thinking Out Loud"	Fall Out Boy – "Uma Thurman"; Arctic Monkeys – "Why'd You Only Call Me When You're High?"; Florence + the Machine – "Ship to Wreck"; Hozier – "Take Me to Church"; Walk the Moon – "Shut Up + Dance"
Best Hip-Hop Video	Best Collaboration
Nicki Minaj – "Anaconda"; Big Sean (featuring E-40) – "I Don't Fuck with You"; Fetty Wap – "Trap Queen"; Kendrick Lamar – "Alright"; Wiz Khalifa (featuring Charlie Puth) – "See You Again"	Taylor Swift (featuring Kendrick Lamar) – "Bad Blood"; Ariana Grande and The Weeknd – " Love Me Harder"; Jessie J, Ariana Grande and Nicki Minaj – "Bang Bang"; Mark Ronson (featuring Bruno Mars) – "Uptown Funk"; Wiz Khalifa (featuring Charlie Puth) – "See You Again"
Best Direction	Best Choreography
Kendrick Lamar – "Alright" (Directors: Colin Tilley and the Little Homies); Childish Gambino – "Sober" (Director: Hiro Murai); Hozier – "Take Me to Church" (Directors: Brendan Canty and Conal Thomson); Mark Ronson (featuring Bruno Mars) – "Uptown Funk" (Directors: Bruno Mars and Cameron Duddy); Taylor Swift (featuring Kendrick Lamar) – "Bad Blood" (Director: Joseph Kahn)	OK Go – "I Won't Let You Down" (Choreographer: OK Go, air:man and Mori Harano); Beyoncé – "7/11" (Choreographers: Beyoncé, Chris Grant and Gabriel Valenciano); Chet Faker – "Gold" (Choreographer: Ryan Heffington); Flying Lotus (featuring Kendrick Lamar) – "Never Catch Me" (Choreographers: Keone Madrid and Mari Madrid); Ed Sheeran – "Don't" (Choreographers: Nappytabs)
Best Visual Effects	Best Art Direction
Skrillex and Diplo (featuring Justin Bieber) – "Where Are Ü Now" (Visual Effects: Brewer, GloriaFX, Tomash Kuzmytskyi and Max Chyzhevskyy); Childish Gambino – "Telegraph Ave." (Visual Effects: GloriaFX); FKA Twigs – "Two Weeks" (Visual Effects: GloriaFX, Tomash Kuzmytskyi and Max Chyzhevskyy); Taylor Swift (featuring Kendrick Lamar) – "Bad Blood" (Visual Effects: Ingenuity Studios); Tyler, The Creator – "Fucking Young/Death Camp" (Visual Effects: GloriaFX)	Snoop Dogg – "So Many Pros" (Art Director: Jason Fijal); The Chemical Brothers – "Go" (Art Director: Michel Gondry); Skrillex and Diplo (featuring Justin Bieber) – "Where Are Ü Now" (Art Director: Brewer); Taylor Swift (featuring Kendrick Lamar) – "Bad Blood" (Art Director: Charles Infante); Jack White – "Would You Fight for My Love?" (Art Director: Jeff Peterson)
Best Editing	Best Cinematography
Beyoncé – "7/11" (Editors: Beyoncé, Ed Burke and Jonathan Wing); ASAP Rocky – "L$D" (Editor: Dexter Navy); Ed Sheeran – "Don't" (Editor: Jacquelyn London); Skrillex and Diplo (featuring Justin Bieber) – "Where Are Ü Now" (Editor: Brewer); Taylor Swift (featuring Kendrick Lamar) – "Bad Blood" (Editor: Chancler Haynes at Cosmo Street)	Flying Lotus (featuring Kendrick Lamar) – "Never Catch Me" (Director of Photography: Larkin Seiple); Alt-J – "Left Hand Free" (Director of Photography: Mike Simpson); FKA Twigs – "Two Weeks" (Director of Photography: Justin Brown); Ed Sheeran – "Thinking Out Loud" (Director of Photography: Daniel Pearl); Taylor Swift (featuring Kendrick Lamar) – "Bad Blood" (Director of Photography: Christopher Probst)
Best Video with a Social Message	Song of Summer
Big Sean (featuring Kanye West and John Legend) – "One Man Can Change the World"; Colbie Caillat – "Try"; Jennifer Hudson – "I Still Love You"; Rihanna – "American Oxygen"; Wale – "The White Shoes"	5 Seconds of Summer – "She's Kinda Hot"; Fetty Wap – "My Way"; Fifth Harmony – "Worth It"; Selena Gomez (featuring ASAP Rocky) – "Good for You"; David Guetta (featuring Nicki Minaj) – "Hey Mama"; Demi Lovato – "Cool for the Summer"; Major Lazer – "Lean On"; OMI – "Cheerleader"; Silentó – "Watch Me (Whip/Nae Nae)"; Skrillex and Diplo (featuring Justin Bieber) – "Where Are U Now"; Taylor Swift – "Bad Blood"; The Weeknd – "Can't Feel My Face"
Michael Jackson Video Vanguard Award
Kanye West

== Artists with multiple wins and nominations ==
Artists who received multiple awards
Wins	Artist
4	Taylor Swift

Artists who received multiple nominations
Nominations	Artist
10	Taylor Swift
6	Ed Sheeran
5	Beyoncé
5	Mark Ronson
4	Diplo
4	Kendrick Lamar
4	Nicki Minaj
4	Skrillex
3	Fetty Wap
3	FKA Twigs
3	The Weeknd
2	Ariana Grande
2	ASAP Rocky
2	Big Sean
2	Childish Gambino
2	Flying Lotus
2	Hozier
2	Wiz Khalifa

== Music Videos with multiple wins and nominations ==
Music Videos that received multiple awards
Wins	Artist(s)	Music Video
2	Taylor Swift (featuring Kendrick Lamar)	"Bad Blood"
2	Taylor Swift	"Blank Space"

Music Videos that received multiple nominations
Nominations	Artist(s)	Music Video
7	Taylor Swift (featuring Kendrick Lamar)	"Bad Blood"
5	Beyoncé	"7/11"
5	Mark Ronson (featuring Bruno Mars)	"Uptown Funk"
4	Kendrick Lamar	"Alright"
4	Skrillex and Diplo (featuring Justin Bieber)	"Where Are Ü Now"
4	Ed Sheeran	"Thinking Out Loud"
2	Ed Sheeran	"Don't"
2	Fetty Wap	"Trap Queen"
2	FKA Twigs	"Two Weeks"
2	Flying Lotus (featuring Kendrick Lamar)	"Never Catch Me"
2	Hozier	"Take Me to Church"
2	Nicki Minaj	"Anaconda"
2	Taylor Swift	"Blank Space"
2	Wiz Khalifa (featuring Charlie Puth)	"See You Again"

== See also ==
- 2015 MTV Europe Music Awards
