= Multiply (ASAP Rocky song) =

2014 single by ASAP Rocky featuring Juicy J

Promotional single by ASAP Rocky featuring Juicy J

from the album At. Long. Last. ASAP (Japanese version)
- A-side: "Lord Pretty Flacko Jodye 2 (LPFJ2)"
- Released: October 3, 2014
- Recorded: 2013–14
- Genre: Hip-hop
- Length: 3:44
- Label: RCA
- Songwriters: Rakim Mayers; Jordan Houston
- Producer: Curtis Heron

ASAP Rocky singles chronology
"Pretend" (2014)	"Multiply" (2014)	"Lord Pretty Flacko Jodye 2 (LPFJ2)" (2015)

Juicy J singles chronology
"She Knows" (2014)	"Multiply" (2014)	"I Don't Mind" (2014)

Music video
- "Multiply" on YouTube

"Multiply" is a hip hop song recorded by American rapper ASAP Rocky, which was made available for online streaming on October 3, 2014. Four days later, it was released as a digital single by RCA Records. The song features Juicy J and was produced by Curtis Heron. A music video for the track was co-directed by ASAP Rocky and Shomi Patwary. The single serves as a promotional single for Rocky's second studio album At. Long. Last. ASAP (2015).

== Release and composition ==
On October 2, 2014, ASAP Rocky announced that he had signed a contract with William Morris Endeavor and would be represented by the agency worldwide. The same day, ASAP Yams and ASAP Rocky posted links to the website FlackoJodyeSeason.com, and announced a release for midnight. The song, along with the music video, was released at midnight on the website, which had previously displayed a countdown timer. Upon the release, ASAP Rocky teased the release of his second studio album but gave no further details.

"Multiply" is three minutes and 44 seconds long (3:44). The song was produced by Curtis Heron and features Juicy J. In the song, ASAP Rocky makes several references to the fashion industry, saying "I'm the motherfuckin' lord of this fashion shit / Don't I deserve just to brag a bit?" and mentioning designer brands Balmain and Maison Martin Margiela. He also mocks fashion labels Been Trill and Hood By Air, which he has supported in the past. Further, ASAP Rocky honors deceased rapper Pimp C with the line "Even in my will, keep it trill to the day I peel."

The record was physically released as a B-side to the white 7" LPFJ2 vinyl record released for Record Store Day in 2015.

== Critical reception ==
Been Trill responded to the song by selling T-shirts printed with a screenshot of A$AP Rocky standing in front of a screen displaying a verboten sign placed over the Been Trill logo. He also showed disappointment towards ASAP Rocky but complimented the song and music video. Consequence of Sound described the sound of the song as a "gritty, hard-hitting anthem", while James Harris of Complex called it "aggressive" and an "absolute banger".

== Music video ==
The music video for "Multiply", co-directed by ASAP Rocky and Shomi Patwary, takes place in New York City and features the ASAP Mob rapping in a room equipped with numerous LED lights, on the streets of New York, and the subway. Rapper Yung Gleesh and M-1 of Dead Prez also make appearances in the video.

== Charts ==
Chart (2014)	Peak position
Belgium (Ultratip Bubbling Under Flanders)	79
Belgium Urban (Ultratop Flanders)	40
UK Singles (Official Charts Company)	184
UK Hip Hop/R&B (OCC)	27
US Hot R&B/Hip-Hop Songs (Billboard)	49

== Live performances ==
ASAP Rocky first performed "Multiply" with ASAP Ferg during the latter's set at the Coachella Valley Music and Arts Festival in April 2014.

== Release history ==
Country	Date	Format(s)	Label	Ref.
Australia	October 7, 2014	Digital download	RCA Records	
Canada	October 7, 2014	Digital download	RCA Records	
New Zealand	October 7, 2014	Digital download	RCA Records	
United Kingdom	October 7, 2014	Digital download	RCA Records	
United States	October 7, 2014	Digital download	RCA Records	

== Certifications ==
Certifications for "Multiply"
Region	Certification	Certified units/sales
United States (RIAA)	Gold	500,000^{‡}
^{‡} Sales+streaming figures based on certification alone.
