= Am I Dreaming (Metro Boomin, ASAP Rocky and Roisee song) =

2023 song by Metro Boomin, ASAP Rocky and Roisee

Song by Metro Boomin, A$AP Rocky and Roisee

from the album Spider-Man: Across the Spider-Verse (Soundtrack from and Inspired by the Motion Picture)
- Released: June 2, 2023
- Genre: Baroque pop; alternative hip hop
- Length: 4:16
- Label: Boominati; Republic
- Songwriters: Leland Wayne; Rakim Mayers; Uriel Brush; Michael Dean; Peter Lee Johnson; Landon Wayne
- Producers: Metro Boomin; Mike Dean; Johnson; Scriptplugg

"Am I Dreaming" is a song by American record producer Metro Boomin, American rapper A$AP Rocky, and American singer Roisee. It was released through Boominati Worldwide and Republic Records as the second track from Metro's first soundtrack album, which was for the film Spider-Man: Across the Spider-Verse, on June 2, 2023. The song was produced by Metro himself, Mike Dean, Peter Lee Johnson, and Scriptplugg, and the four wrote it with A$AP Rocky and Roisee. It plays during the opening sequence of the film's closing credits.

The track has received widespread critical acclaim especially for the promising introduction of Roisee into the mainstream and was shortlisted for the Academy Award for Best Original Song at the 96th Academy Awards, though it ultimately did not receive a nomination for the award.

== Composition and lyrics ==
The song features a string quartet sample in the key of A minor overlaid with synths and a trap beat with a tempo of 90 beats per minute. The string quartet sample was done by Peter Lee Johnson. In an interview, Metro Boomin talks about how he asked Johnson create some maximalist violins in the themes of 2010s era Kanye West. According to film co-writer and co-producer Phil Lord, Metro Boomin had texted him the strings sample and worked with producer Mike Dean to add the synths to the sample, creating what would later become "Am I Dreaming".

In the first verse, A$AP Rocky raps from the perspective of Miles Morales from the film Spider-Man: Across the Spider-Verse using lyrics like "Count up my ones, lacin' up my favorite 1s" and "Kiss my momma on the forehead 'fore I get the Code Red / And swing by 410, beef patty, cornbread". He references the film and possibly his life before fame. Rookie artist Roisee sings the chorus and adds a verse of her own.

== Accolades ==
Year	Organization	Award	Result	Ref.
2023	Hollywood Music in Media Awards	Song - Animated Film	Nominated	

== Charts ==
Chart performance for "Am I Dreaming"
Chart (2023)	Peak position
Australia (ARIA)	20
Australia Hip Hop/R&B (ARIA)	10
Canada Hot 100 (Billboard)	28
France (SNEP)	131
Global 200 (Billboard)	34
India International Singles (IMI)	13
Ireland (IRMA)	49
New Zealand (Recorded Music NZ)	16
Portugal (AFP)	184
Singapore (RIAS)	15
Slovakia Singles Digital (ČNS IFPI)	57
UK Singles (Official Charts)	51
UK Hip Hop/R&B (Official Charts)	24
US Billboard Hot 100	51
US Hot R&B/Hip-Hop Songs (Billboard)	15

== Certifications ==
Certifications for "Am I Dreaming"
Region	Certification	Certified units/sales
Australia (ARIA)	Platinum	70,000^{‡}
Brazil (Pro-Música Brasil)	Gold	20,000^{‡}
France (SNEP)	Gold	100,000^{‡}
New Zealand (RMNZ)	Gold	15,000^{‡}
Poland (ZPAV)	Gold	25,000^{‡}
United Kingdom (BPI)	Silver	200,000^{‡}
^{‡} Sales+streaming figures based on certification alone.
