= National Nothing Day =

Unofficial American observance on January 16

- Observed by: United States, unofficially
- Celebrations: None
- Date: January 16
- Next time: 16 January 2027
- Frequency: Annual

National Nothing Day is an "un-event" proposed in 1972 by columnist Harold Pullman Coffin and observed in the United States annually on January 16 since 1973, when it was added to Chase's Calendar of Events.

== Status and purpose ==
It is not a public holiday, as that requires an act of Congress. Its purpose is:

to provide Americans with one National Day when they can just sit without celebrating, observing or honoring anything.

It is sponsored by Coffin's National Nothing Foundation, registered in Capitola, California and has been advocated for by the YouTuber Ephemeral Rift.

== Clash with Martin Luther King Jr. Day ==
In the United States, the third Monday of every January has subsequently been inaugurated as Martin Luther King Jr. Day, which falls between the 15th and 21st. This means that January 16 now falls on a public holiday in approximately a seventh of all years (most recently in 2023), effectively usurping the very nature of National Nothing Day.

== Similar ideas ==
In contrast, the Realist Society of Canada (RSC) has a religious holiday called THABS ("There has always been something," pronounced /ˈtæbs/) Day. THABS Day is dedicated to the celebration of "the realization that 'if there was ever nothing, there would be nothing now.'" It is celebrated on July 8 of each year.

Coffin's commemoration, when proposed in 1972, was not a novel idea. In 1956, the Associated Press circulated the proclamation by Mayor James W. Morgan of Birmingham, Alabama, of a "National Nothing Week" to be celebrated Saturday, February 26 through Friday, March 3 that year. The news item appeared in newspapers nationwide.
