= M's (song) =

- Solo version cover

Promotional single by ASAP Rocky featuring Lil Wayne

from the album At. Long. Last. ASAP
- Released: April 10, 2015
- Recorded: 2013
- Genre: Trap
- Length: 3:38 (single version); 3:56 (album version)
- Label: ASAP Worldwide; Polo Grounds; RCA
- Songwriters: Rakim Mayers; Dwayne Carter; Mike Dean; Carlton Mays, Jr.
- Producers: Honorable C.N.O.T.E.; Mike Dean (co.)

"M's" (stylized "M'$") is a song by American rapper ASAP Rocky, taken from Rocky's second studio album At. Long. Last. ASAP (2015). The song, produced by Honorable C.N.O.T.E. alongside Mike Dean, features a guest appearance from fellow American rapper Lil Wayne on the album version. The song was originally released as a promotional single without Lil Wayne on April 10, 2015. Upon the release of the album, high downloads resulted in the song peaking at number 6 on the US Billboard Bubbling Under Hot 100 Singles chart.

== Chart performance ==
Chart (2015)	Peak position
US Bubbling Under Hot 100 (Billboard)	6
US Hot R&B/Hip-Hop Songs (Billboard)	41

== Release history ==
Country	Date	Format	Label
United States	April 10, 2015	Digital download	Polo Grounds; RCA
