= LSD (song) =

2015 single by ASAP Rocky

Single by ASAP Rocky

from the album At.Long.Last.ASAP
- Released: May 21, 2015
- Recorded: 2014
- Genre: Neo-soul; alternative R&B; neo-psychedelia
- Length: 3:58
- Label: Polo Grounds; RCA
- Songwriters: Rakim Mayers; Issac de Boni; Michael Burman; Hector Delgado; Bobbie Gentry; Michael Mule; James Scheffer
- Producers: Hector Delgado; Jim Jonsin; FnZ; ASAP Rocky

ASAP Rocky singles chronology
"Everyday" (2015)	"LSD" (2015)	"Good for You" (2015)

Music video
- "LSD" on YouTube

"LSD" (stylized as "L$D"; abbreviation for "Love, Sex, Dreams") is a song by ASAP Rocky, an American hip hop recording artist. It was released on May 21, 2015, as the third single from his second studio album, At. Long. Last. ASAP (2015). The song contains a sample from "Ode to Billie Joe" by Lou Donaldson for the song's drums. "LSD" is a musical shift for ASAP Rocky into a more melodious and introspective style.

== Music video ==
A music video for the song, directed by Dexter Navy and co-directed by ASAP Rocky himself, was released on May 19, 2015. The second half of the music video contains a snippet of "Excuse Me" which also appears on the album. Navy is known for directing other music videos for ASAP Rocky such as Kids Turned Out Fine and ASAP Forever. The video for "LSD" was nominated for Best Music Video at the 58th Annual Grammy Awards. The video directly borrows imagery and was heavily influenced by French director Gaspar Noe's 2009 psychedelic art film Enter the Void. The song came in at number 64 on the Triple J Hottest 100 for 2015.

== Awards and nominations ==
Year	Ceremony	Award	Result
2015	MTV Video Music Awards	Best Editing	Nominated
2016	Grammy Awards	Best Music Video	Nominated

== Charts ==
Chart (2015)	Peak position
Australia (ARIA)	83
Canada Hot 100 (Billboard)	79
Sweden Heatseeker (Sverigetopplistan)	19
US Billboard Hot 100	62
US Hot R&B/Hip-Hop Songs (Billboard)	20

== Certifications ==
Region	Certification	Certified units/sales
Australia (ARIA)	Platinum	70,000^{‡}
Canada (Music Canada)	Platinum	80,000^{‡}
Denmark (IFPI Danmark)	Gold	45,000^{‡}
New Zealand (RMNZ)	2× Platinum	60,000^{‡}
Poland (ZPAV)	Gold	25,000^{‡}
Portugal (AFP)	Gold	10,000^{‡}
United Kingdom (BPI)	Gold	400,000^{‡}
United States (RIAA)	4× Platinum	4,000,000^{‡}
^{‡} Sales+streaming figures based on certification alone.
