= ASAP Rocky =

American rapper (born 1988)

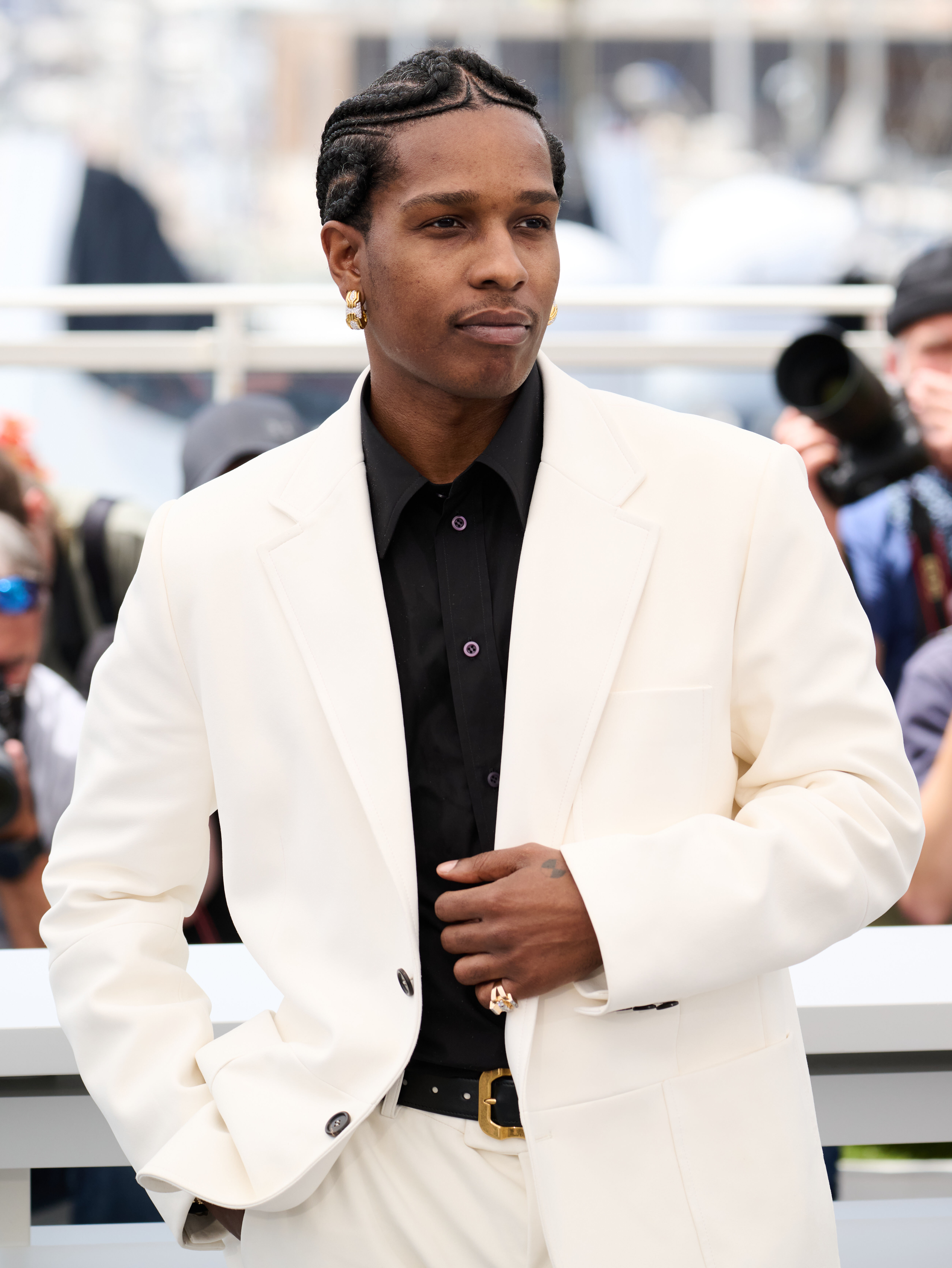
- ASAP Rocky at the 2025 Cannes Film Festival
- Born: Rakim Athelston Mayers; October 3, 1988 (age 38); New York City, U.S.
- Other names: Lord Flacko; Pretty Flacko Jodye II; Flacko; Lord Pretty Flacko Jodye
- Education: Bayard Rustin Educational Complex
- Occupations: Rapper; songwriter; record producer; model; actor; fashion designer
- Years active: 2007–present
- Organization: AWGE
- Agent: William Morris Endeavor
- Works: Discography; production
- Partner(s): Chanel Iman (2013–2014); Rihanna (2020–present)
- Children: 3
- Awards: Full list
- Musical career
- Genres: East Coast hip-hop; psychedelic rap; experimental hip-hop; alternative hip-hop; cloud rap
- Labels: ASAP Worldwide; AWGE; Polo Grounds; RCA
- Member of: ASAP Mob
- Website: asaprocky.com

Rakim Athelston Mayers (born October 3, 1988), known professionally as ASAP Rocky (Note: Taken from the ASAP Mob collective, it is short for Acronym Symbolizing Any Purpose) (/ˈeɪsæp/ AY-sap; stylized as A$AP Rocky), is an American rapper, record producer, actor, fashion designer, and model. Born and raised in Harlem, he embarked on his musical career as a member of the hip-hop collective ASAP Mob, from which he adopted his stage name. In August 2011, Mayers's single "Peso" was leaked online and began receiving radio airplay within weeks, propelling cloud rap into mainstream attention. He signed with Polo Grounds Music, an imprint of RCA Records, that October and released his debut mixtape, Live. Love. A$AP to widespread critical acclaim.

Mayers's 2012 single, "Fuckin' Problems" (featuring Drake, 2 Chainz and Kendrick Lamar), marked his first entry—at number eight—on the Billboard Hot 100, was nominated for Best Rap Song at the 56th Annual Grammy Awards, and preceded his debut studio album, Long. Live. A$AP (2013). A critical and commercial success, it debuted atop the Billboard 200 and received double platinum certification by the Recording Industry Association of America (RIAA). His second album, At. Long. Last. A$AP (2015), also debuted atop the chart and saw continued critical praise; its two lead singles, "Lord Pretty Flacko Jodye 2 (LPFJ2)" and "Everyday" (featuring Rod Stewart, Miguel and Mark Ronson), both received double platinum certifications by the RIAA, while its third, "L$D", was nominated for Best Music Video at the 58th Annual Grammy Awards. His third album, Testing (2018), debuted within the Billboard 200's top five, while his fourth album, Don't Be Dumb (2026), debuted atop the chart.

Aside from his musical career, Mayers founded the creative agency and record label AWGE in 2014. AWGE launched partnerships with Marine Serre, Amina Muaddi, Moncler, JW Anderson, Under Armour, PacSun, Vans, Mercedes-Benz, Selfridges, as well as conceptual collaborations with MTV and Needles. Mayers co-launched cult fashion label VLONE, co-chaired the Met Gala in 2025 and spearheaded campaigns for DKNY, Calvin Klein, Gucci, Bottega Veneta, Ferragamo, Beats by Dre, Dior Homme and more. As of 2025, he serves as the creative director for Puma F1 and Ray-Ban. As an actor, Mayers has had supporting roles in Dope (2015), Monster (2018), Spike Lee's Highest 2 Lowest (2025) alongside Denzel Washington, and If I Had Legs I'd Kick You (2025).

Mayers has received accolades such as a BET Award, two BET Hip Hop Awards, an MTV Video Music Award Japan and an MTVU Woodie Award. His creative entrepreneurship has been rewarded with the Global Style Icon Award, the Virgil Abloh award, the Cultural Innovator Award, the Collaboration Of The Year Award, and the Fashion Icon Award. He has been nominated for two Grammy Awards, six World Music Awards, three MTV Video Music Awards and two MTV Europe Music Awards. Furthermore, Mayers has co-directed most of his own music videos, as well as worked in production or co-writing for other artists, often under the pseudonym Lord Flacko.

== Early life ==
Rakim Athelston Mayers was born on October 3, 1988, in the Harlem neighborhood of Manhattan, a borough of New York City. His father, Adrian "Duke" Athelston Mayers, was from Barbados and his mother, Rina "Renee" Black, is of Black American descent. The couple raised four children together: Ricky, Erika B., Rakim and Asia. Both Rakim and Erika's names are taken from the Eric B. & Rakim duo. Mayers has 10 other paternal siblings. His cousin is fellow ASAP Mob member ASAP Nast.

Mayers started rapping at age nine, when he moved to Harrisburg, Pennsylvania. He learned how to rap from his older brother, who also wore the cornrows hairdo that Mayers later adopted. When Mayers was 13, his brother Ricky was killed by gun violence in Harlem. The death inspired Mayers to take rapping more seriously. Mayers grew up admiring Harlem-based rap group the Diplomats. He was also influenced by Mobb Deep, Three 6 Mafia, UGK, Run DMC, Wu-Tang Clan, and Bone Thugs-n-Harmony.

When Mayers was 12 years old, his father went to jail and he spent his teenage years moving around homeless shelters with his mother and sister. After living for a period in a shelter with his mother in New York City, he moved to Midtown Manhattan. His father died in 2012.

== Career ==
=== 2007–2011: Career beginnings ===
In 2007, Mayers joined the A$AP Mob crew, a Harlem-based collective of rappers, producers, music video directors, fashion designers, and bikers who shared similar interests in music, fashion, style, and art. It had been formed by A$AP Yams, A$AP Bari and A$AP Illz. In July 2011, Mayers released his single "Purple Swag" which quickly became a street anthem in New York City.

In August 2011, Mayers's single "Peso", was leaked online and within weeks received airplay on the high-profile Hot 97 New York radio station. After he released a music video for his song "Purple Swag", he received attention from several record labels. In October, he released the mixtape Live. Love. A$AP to critical acclaim. Earlier that month, he signed a two-year, $3 million record deal with Bryan Leach's Polo Grounds Music, which at the time was distributed by Clive Davis' Sony Music division of J Records. Upon his record deal, Mayers started a label, A$AP Worldwide, with A$AP Yams. However, Mayers's deal with J Records would be short-lived, when on October 7, RCA Music Group announced that it was merging J alongside Arista and Jive Records into RCA Records. With the shutdown, Mayers (and all other artists previously signed to these three labels) will release future material under RCA. On December 5, he was nominated for BBC's Sound of 2012 poll.

=== 2012–2014: Touring and Long. Live. A$AP ===
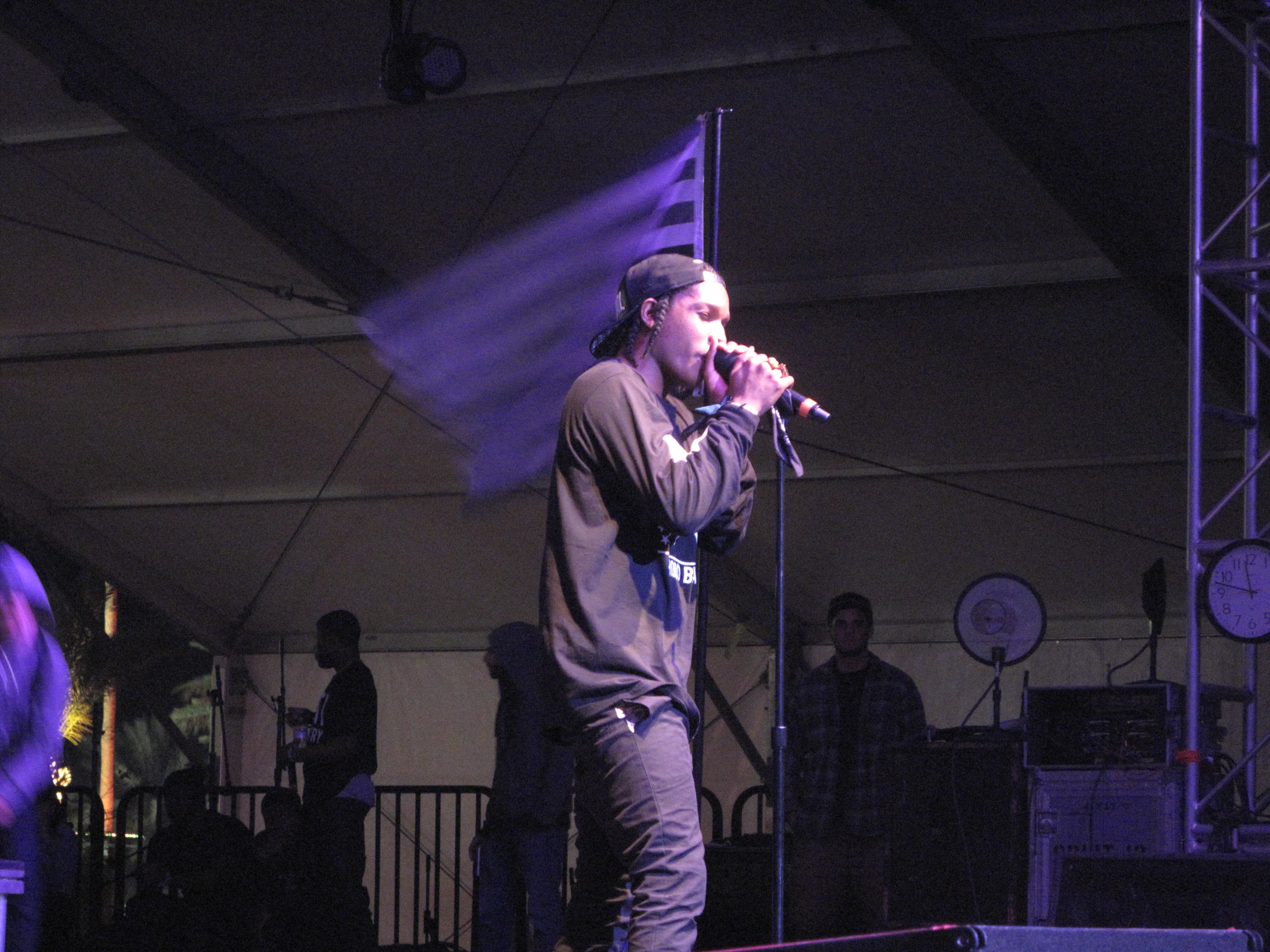
Mayers performing at the 2012 Coachella Valley Music and Arts Festival

In February 2012, Mayers joined Kendrick Lamar as the opening act for Drake's Club Paradise Tour. In June, SpaceGhostPurrp, founder of Miami-based collective Raider Klan and Mayers's past collaborator, accused A$AP Twelvyy of jumping Raider Klan's Matt Stoops and subsequently disassociated himself from A$AP Mob and Mayers in a YouTube video. He and Raider Klan also accused ASAP Mob of copying their style, and Mayers of using lyrics from SpaceGhostPurrp's song "My Enemy" on "Goldie". Mayers responded in a July interview for MTV, saying that SpaceGhostPurrp is "try[ing] to build hype" and told him to "stick to makin' beats".

In July 2012, Mayers performed at the Pitchfork Music Festival. He was scheduled to make his network television debut on Late Night with Jimmy Fallon on July 20, but he was then arrested the night before, after an alleged involvement in a brawl, with 21-year-old artist iRome. The scuffle took place in downtown Manhattan and the performance was canceled. After it was rescheduled for August 21, Mayers performed "Goldie" on the show. On September 6, he also performed a guest rap on Rihanna's "Cockiness (Love It)" at the 2012 MTV Video Music Awards.

Mayers recorded his debut studio album Long. Live. A$AP, along with several producers, such as Clams Casino, Hit-Boy, Friendzone, A$AP Ty Beats, Soufien3000 and Joey Fat Beats. "Goldie" was released as the album's first single on April 27. On August 27, his crew A$AP Mob released the mixtape Lords Never Worry as a free download. During September through November, Mayers promoted the album with the 40-date national concert tour, the Long Live ASAP Tour, with opening acts ScHoolboy Q, Danny Brown, and A$AP Mob. Long. Live. A$AP was released on January 15, 2013, to mostly positive reviews from critics. The album debuted at number one on the Billboard 200, with first-week sales of 139,000 copies in the United States. As of March 13, 2013, it has sold 284,000 copies. On March 16, 2015, Long. Live. A$AP was certified gold by the Recording Industry Association of America (RIAA), for the shipment of 500,000 copies in the United States.

On April 12, 2013, in an interview at Wild 94.9 radio station, Mayers revealed that he was working on an instrumental album, which he plans on releasing without notice. He also discussed his favorite music videos and talked about his desire to collaborate with veteran rapper André 3000. On June 21, Mayers told MTV News that he had completed his debut instrumental album, which mostly consists of ambient oriented instrumental tracks, titled Beauty & The Beast: Slowed Down Sessions (Chapter 1) and was originally set to be released during the summer for free download. However, that album was delayed with no release date announced. Mayers previewed two snippets that would have made the Beauty & The Beast: Slowed Down Sessions (Chapter 1) compilation, titled "Riot Rave" and "Unicorn". The project has not been released as of 2025.

=== 2015–2017: At. Long. Last. A$AP ===
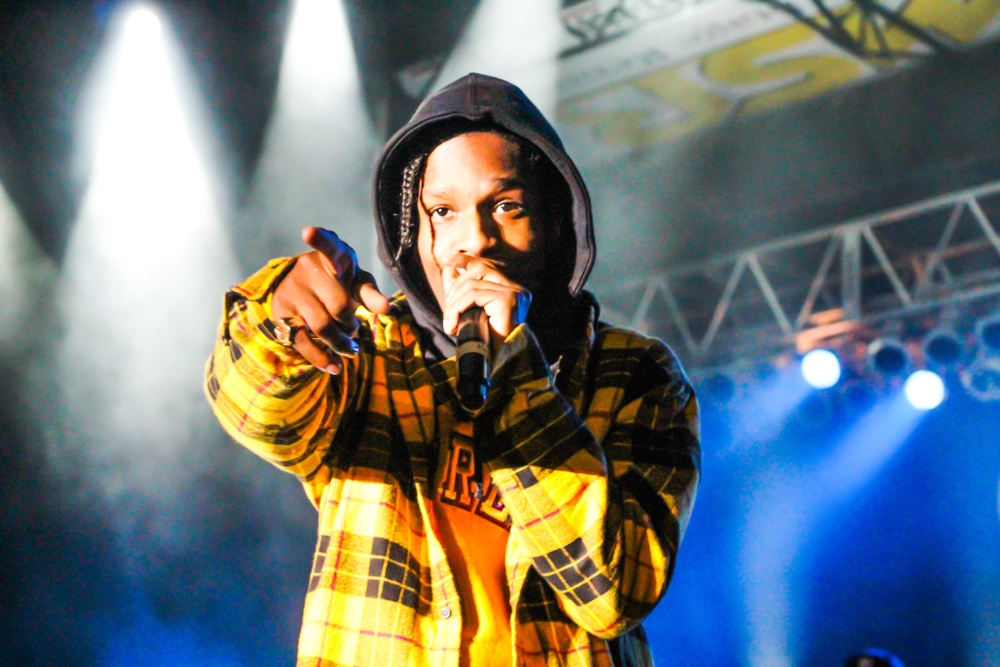
Mayers in 2013

On March 16, 2014, Mayers announced that he was working on his second studio album, entitled A.L.L.A. (an acronym for At. Long. Last. A$AP) which was a follow-up to his debut album, Long. Live. A$AP. Upon the wake of a delay of the ASAP Mob album, L.O.R.D., Mayers subsequently collaborated with cohorts A$AP Ferg, Nast and Twelvyy on the album's third single, "Hella Hoes", which was released on June 6, 2014. Nonetheless, A$AP Mob leader A$AP Yams announced on his Tumblr account that the album had been shelved. On October 3, 2014, his 26th birthday, Mayers launched a short-lived music giveaway called Flacko Jodye Season, which first premiered with "Multiply", which featured additional vocals from Juicy J; later released on iTunes one week after its premiere.

On New Year's Day 2015, Mayers released his second album's lead single, "Lord Pretty Flacko Jodye 2 (LPFJ2)", a sequel to "Pretty Flacko". Then, on January 18, seventeen days after the single's release, Mayers's mentor and partner, Steven "A$AP Yams" Rodriguez, died at the age of 26. However, some reports later stated that Yams' cause was ruled acute mixed drug intoxication while Mayers and several A$AP Mob members and affiliates said that the late leader of the collective died due to his sleep apnea, which caused asphyxiation and pulmonary aspiration. Weeks after Yams' death, Mayers revealed that At. Long. Last. A$AP was executive-produced by rapper Juicy J, producer Danger Mouse, Mayers and Yams themselves.

In 2015, Mayers appeared in a cameo role in the indie comedy-drama, Dope. The film premiered at the 2015 Sundance Film Festival on January 21, 2015. It opened in all movie theaters on June 12. There at the event, Mayers explained his expressions and grief over the death of his own friend and partner; performed "Multiply" on-stage as a dedication to his loving memory, minutes before running backstage to calm down. In March 2015, Mayers said in an interview with MTV News that he made songs such as "Wild For The Night" and "Fuckin' Problems" for mainstream commercial success, and that he now hated those songs.

On April 8, 2015, the rapper released a song, titled "M'$", debuted during an interview with the Red Bull Music Academy, and was released on the iTunes Store two days later, however, it was announced that the song was not an official single from the album. The album, however, did include a remixed version of the track that replaced Mayers's second verse with a guest verse from Lil Wayne. On May 9, Mayers unveiled the album's cover art on his official Instagram page, with the caption "AT LONG LAST...." On the same day, he then released the album's alternative artwork and released the album's second single, titled "Everyday" featuring Rod Stewart, Miguel and Mark Ronson (the latter of which also produced the track alongside Emile Haynie). Mayers also announced that the release date for A.L.L.A. was updated to June 2, 2015; however, on May 25, 2015, around 6:00 PM EDT, the album leaked online, approximately one week before its expected release. Subsequently, Mayers tweeted to announce that the album will be released at midnight (May 26), changing the date a week early.

Upon its release, At. Long. Last. A$AP received generally positive to mixed reviews from music critics. Overall, the album was supported by the release of three singles: "Lord Pretty Flacko Jodye 2 (LPFJ2)", "Everyday" and "L$D". At. Long. Last. A$AP debuted at number one on the Billboard 200, selling 116,000 copies in the United States. In conclusion to this, it also gave Mayers his second consecutive number one album on the charts to date. In Canada, the album debuted at number one, with 11,000 copies sold. The album has spent two more weeks beyond the top ten of the Billboard 200. As of July 2015, the album has sold 215,000 copies in the United States. It has sold 60,662 copies in the United Kingdom, as of June 2015.

On June 11, 2015, Mayers was featured on The Tonight Show, where he performed the song "L$D" with The Roots. In June, it was confirmed that he was featured on the single "Good for You" by Selena Gomez. In June 2015, he appeared on the "Carpool Karaoke" segment of The Late Late Show, riding with Rod Stewart and host James Corden. Mayers is featured on "Blended Family (What You Do for Love)", a track written with Alicia Keys for her sixth studio album Here in 2016. He is also featured on two tracks from the 2017 album Lust for Life by Lana Del Rey. The tracks are called "Summer Bummer", which also features Playboi Carti, and "Groupie Love". He is featured along with rapper Cardi B on "No Limit" by G-Eazy, released in September 2017. He also featured in "Pick It Up" by Famous Dex, released in October 2017.

=== 2018–present: Testing and Don't Be Dumb ===
On January 23, 2018, Mayers released "☆☆☆☆☆ 5ive $tar$" on SoundCloud, produced by Metro Boomin, Frans Mernick, Jordan Blackmon and Daniel Lynas and featuring uncredited vocals by DRAM. Over the following two days he shared "Above", produced by Mernick and "Money Bags Freestyle (Dean Blunt Meditation)", produced by Blunt and featuring uncredited vocals by Lil Yachty. The songs were captioned "TESTING COMING SOON" and "THIS IS JUST A TEST", leading to speculation that they were in promotion of an upcoming studio album entitled Testing. On February 16, Mayers collaborated with Gucci Mane and 21 Savage for "Cocky", in promotion of the film Uncle Drew. He released the single "Bad Company" on March 27. It features rapper BlocBoy JB, as well as further allusions to Testing in its marketing. On April 5, he released a second single: "ASAP Forever". The song samples record producer Moby's 2000 single "Porcelain", crediting him as a featured artist. It was premiered on The Tonight Show alongside new track "Distorted Records", and a music video was released the following day. A day later he was featured on the song "One Track Mind", from rock band Thirty Seconds to Mars' fifth studio album America.

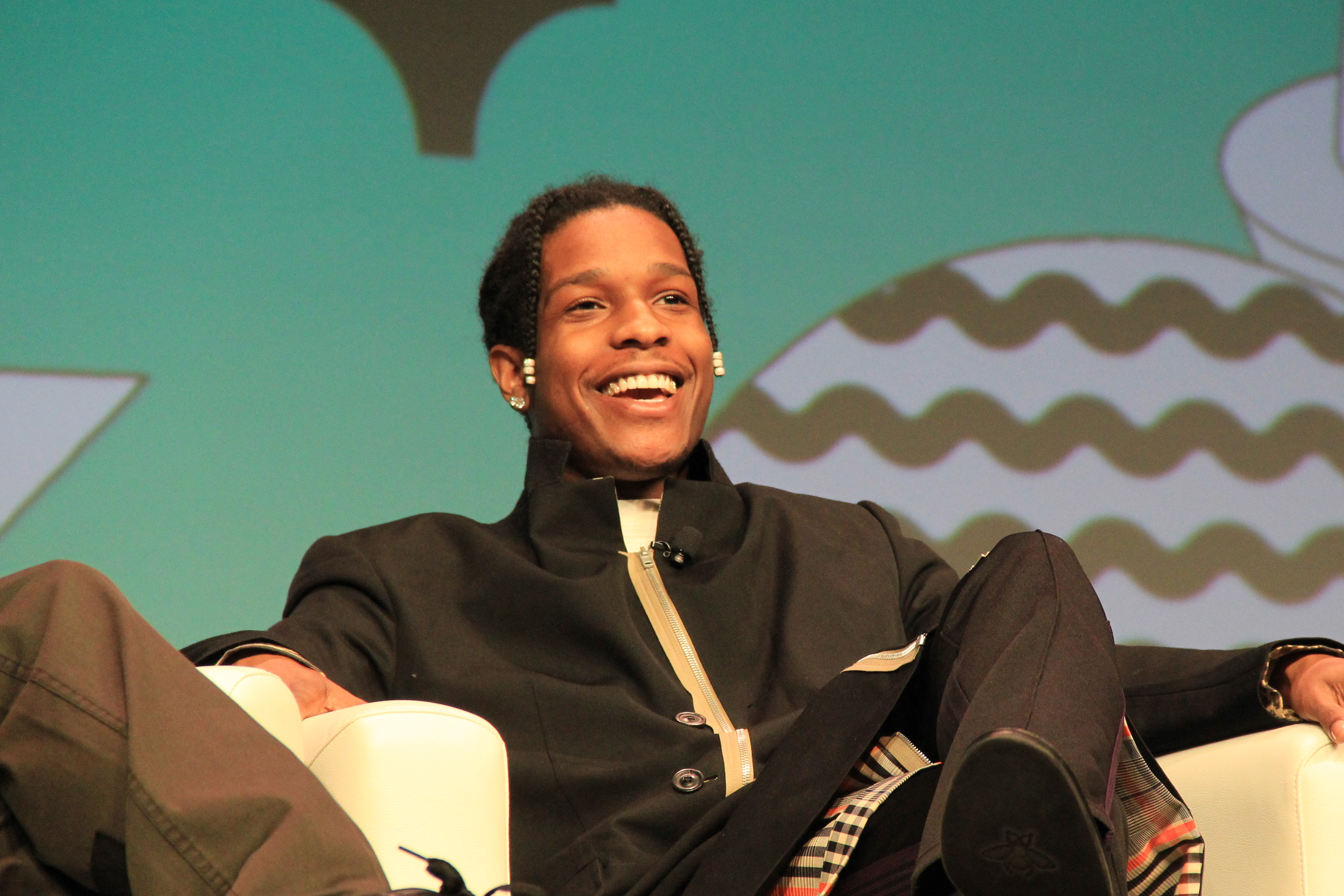
Mayers at South by Southwest in 2019

On May 25, 2018, Mayers released Testing to generally positive reviews from critics. It debuted at number four on the US Billboard 200, becoming Mayers's third consecutive top-five album on the chart.

In its second week, the album charted at number 15, with 26,000 album-equivalent units (1,000 copies). The following week, Testing remained on the Billboard 200 chart at number 22. On July 23, 2018, Mayers and Tyler, the Creator announced a collaborative project, WANGSAP, by releasing a music video of a remix of Monica's "Knock Knock" called "Potato Salad" on AWGE's "AWGE DVD (Vol. 3)". However, in January 2019, Tyler, the Creator announced this album did not yet materialize. In May 2019, Juicy J announced Mayers began working on his upcoming album, formerly titled All Smiles. On August 28, Mayers released the music video for "Babushka Boi", directed by Nadia Lee Cohen.

In October 2021, Mayers released his 2011 mixtape Live. Love. ASAP to all streaming platforms in celebration of its 10-year anniversary. Mayers appeared on two tracks from Nigo's album, I Know Nigo!, released March 25, 2022, the opening track "Lost and Found Freestyle 2019" with Tyler, the Creator, and the single, "Arya". Mayers supported the Red Hot Chili Peppers on their Unlimited Love Tour (2022). After he arrived late for a performance at Old Trafford, Manchester, he performed a shortened 20-minute set after the band. In May 2022, Mayers released the single, "D.M.B.", and followed up in December with "Shittin' Me". Also in December, he appeared on producer Metro Boomin's album Heroes & Villains, on the track "Feel the Fiyaaaah", which also featured late rapper Takeoff, who was killed a month prior to the album's release. He then confirmed a new album with production from Metro Boomin to materialize in the future. Later that month, he named his upcoming fourth album, Don't Be Dumb.

In January 2023, Mayers released "Same Problems?", featuring contributions from Lil Yachty, Miguel, Tyler, the Creator, and Thundercat. In June 2023, Mayers released "Riot (Rowdy Pipe'n)" with contributions from Pharrell Williams and Tyler, the Creator. In the same month, Mayers also appeared on two tracks from Metro Boomin's soundtrack album, Spider-Man: Across the Spider-Verse; "Nonviolent Communication" with James Blake and 21 Savage, and "Am I Dreaming" with Roisee, the latter of which was nominated in the 2023 Hollywood Music in Media Awards.

In August 2024, Mayers released "Highjack" featuring Jessica Pratt, followed by "Tailor Swif", "Ruby Rosary", and "Pray4DaGang", all of whom were intended to be lead singles on his fourth studio album, Don't Be Dumb, but weren't included on the pre-save tracklist.

In August 2025, he released the songs "Both Eyes Closed" and "Trunks", for the soundtrack of the film Highest 2 Lowest, in which he starred in a supporting role. In December 2025, Mayers revealed Don't Be Dumb's cover art, designed by American filmmaker Tim Burton, and the release date of January 16, 2026. The following month, Mayers previewed a teaser of the music video from the album's first single, titled "Punk Rocky". Directed by Mayers himself along with Folkert Verdoorn and Simon Becks, it starred American actress Winona Ryder, and was released on January 5. The album's second single, "Helicopter", was released shortly after, with an accompanying music video, on January 12.

In January 2026, Mayers was announced as a headliner for the June 7th closing date of New York City's multi-day 2026 Governors Ball Music Festival, set to be held at Flushing Meadows–Corona Park for the fourth consecutive year.

Don't Be Dumb was released on January 16, 2026, on National Nothing Day, featuring guest contributions from Brent Faiyaz, Danny Elfman, Doechii, Gorillaz, Sauce Walka, Slay Squad, Thundercat, Tyler, the Creator, Westside Gunn, and will.i.am, among others. The album became Mayers's third number one Billboard 200 album and his first since At. Long. Last. ASAP. Mayers is scheduled to embark on the "Don't Be Dumb World Tour" in support of the album. With legs in North America and Europe, the tour began in Chicago on May 27, and concluded in Athens on October 11, 2026.

On January 22, 2026, Mayers announced an upcoming deluxe reissue of Don't Be Dumb. The next day, he confirmed the re-release, hinting at production from Metro Boomin and Mike Will Made It, along with a possible feature from his partner Rihanna.

On September 3, 2026, special limited-edition jerseys that Mayers designed along with sportswear brand Puma for English Premier League club Manchester City, and Italian Serie A club AC Milan, were officially unveiled. The jerseys featured the phrase "Don't Be Dumb," the name of Mayer's album and tour.

== Business ventures ==
In October 2011, Mayers signed a record deal with Sony Music Entertainment worth $3 million ($1.7 million of which was earmarked for his solo work; $1.3 million earmarked to fund his company). Mayers said that he sought a "bigger platform" for him and his collective with the deal. His first studio album planned to be under the deal, but it allowed him to continue releasing mixtapes through Sony/RED. Fellow rapper and A$AP Mob member A$AP Ferg also signed a joint venture deal with the RCA-distributed Polo Grounds Music; Ferg released his single "Work", for digital retail via various platforms. He later announced an official remix featuring Mayers, French Montana, ScHoolboy Q and Trinidad James.

In 2013, he and ASAP Mob co-founder ASAP Bari released his A$AP merchandise brand, and went to collaborate with high-profile fashion designer and close friend Raf Simons. On October 2, 2014, Mayers announced he had officially signed a contract for worldwide representation with William Morris Endeavor. In February 2016, Guess released a collaboration with Mayers called GUE$$, which was inspired by Mayers's admiration for the brand's vintage '90s clothing that he wore while growing up.

In 2022, Mayers launched his own brand of whisky called Mercer + Prince. It was officially launched on the Revolt TV show, Drink Champs, during a segment in a two-hour long interview. In 2023, he collaborated with Gucci (Guilty perfume advertisements), Puma (sneakers in collaboration with F1) and with Bottega Veneta on a campaign based on paparazzi candids.

== Personal life ==
Mayers was previously a pescetarian. In 2012, he transitioned to a vegetarian diet with the help of his vegan manager after learning of the horrors of the poultry industry. On his 2019 single "Babushka Boi", Mayers stated he is vegan.

Mayers has said that while he was raised in a Christian household, he does not like going to an organized church, and instead has "[his] own relationship with God... I pray every day before I go to sleep." He addresses these views in the song "Holy Ghost" on his 2015 album At. Long. Last. ASAP. During Mayers's 2019 incarceration in Sweden, he prayed to keep himself occupied.

Mayers uses psychedelic drugs such as LSD and has said that they help him cope with life. One of his songs is titled LSD (stylized L$D) and he appeared in the 2020 Netflix documentary Have a Good Trip: Adventures in Psychedelics.

Mayers is 5 ft 11 in (1.80 m) tall, which he revealed in a Nikki & Sara Live interview to contextualize why he felt out-of-place standing next to the much taller Jason Collins.

=== Relationships and children ===
From 2011 to 2012, Mayers dated Australian rapper Iggy Azalea. He began dating model Chanel Iman in early 2013, and in April 2014, they were reported to be engaged, but broke up in June 2014.

On May 19, 2021, Mayers revealed in an interview with GQ that he was in a relationship with Barbadian singer Rihanna, describing her as "the love of my life". Mayers had previously performed as the opening act on Rihanna's Diamonds World Tour in 2013. Rihanna gave birth to their first son in 2022. Their second son was born in 2023, after Rihanna revealed her pregnancy during her Super Bowl LVII halftime show performance. The couple revealed a third pregnancy at the 2025 Met Gala. Their daughter was born later that year.

== Legal issues ==
In 2006, Mayers served two weeks in Rikers Island where he shared a cell with future rapper Casanova.

=== Assault in Sweden ===
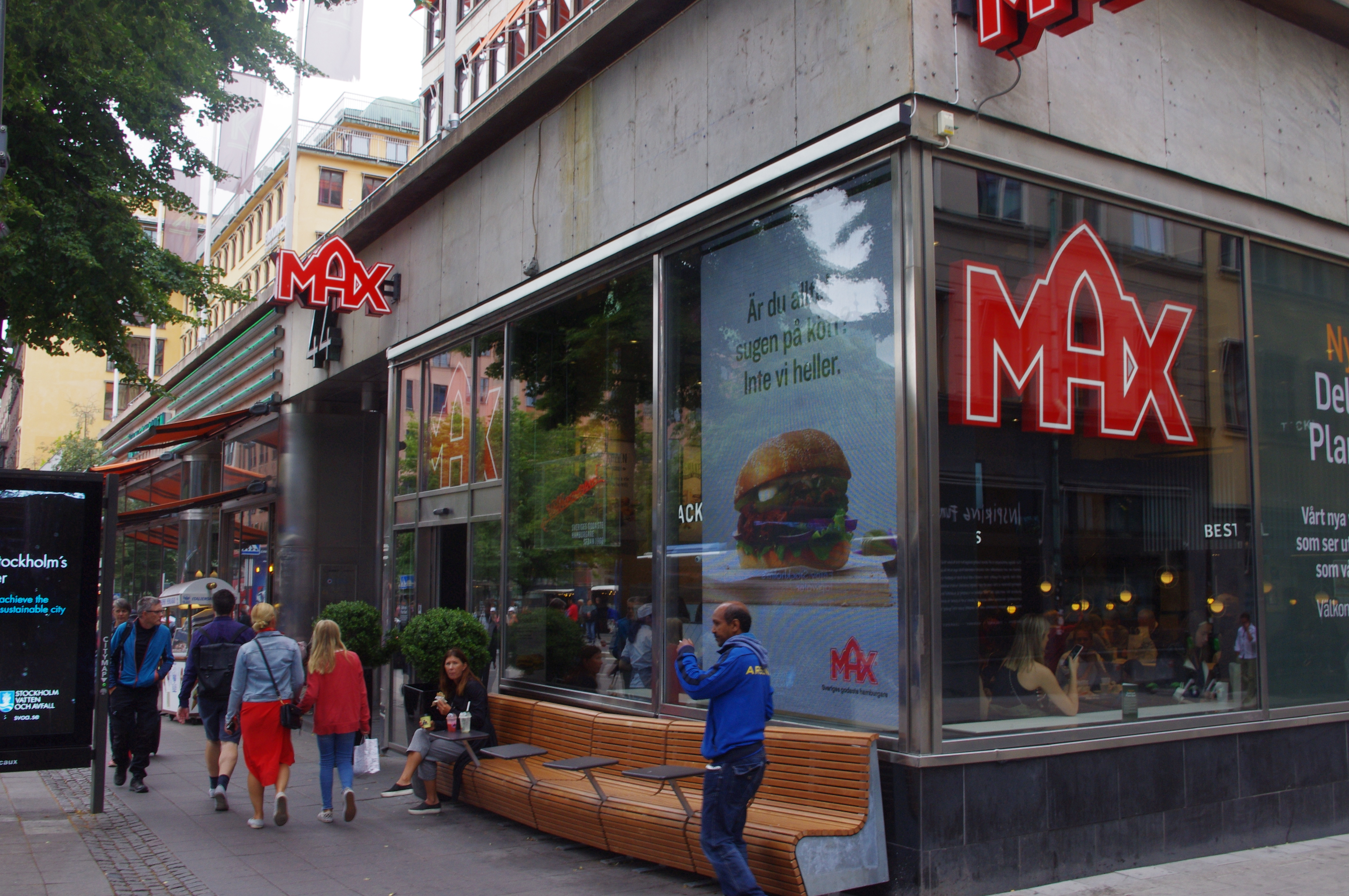
Max Hamburgers at Hötorget where the first contact was made. The victim's headphones were retrieved from the awning on the left in the picture.

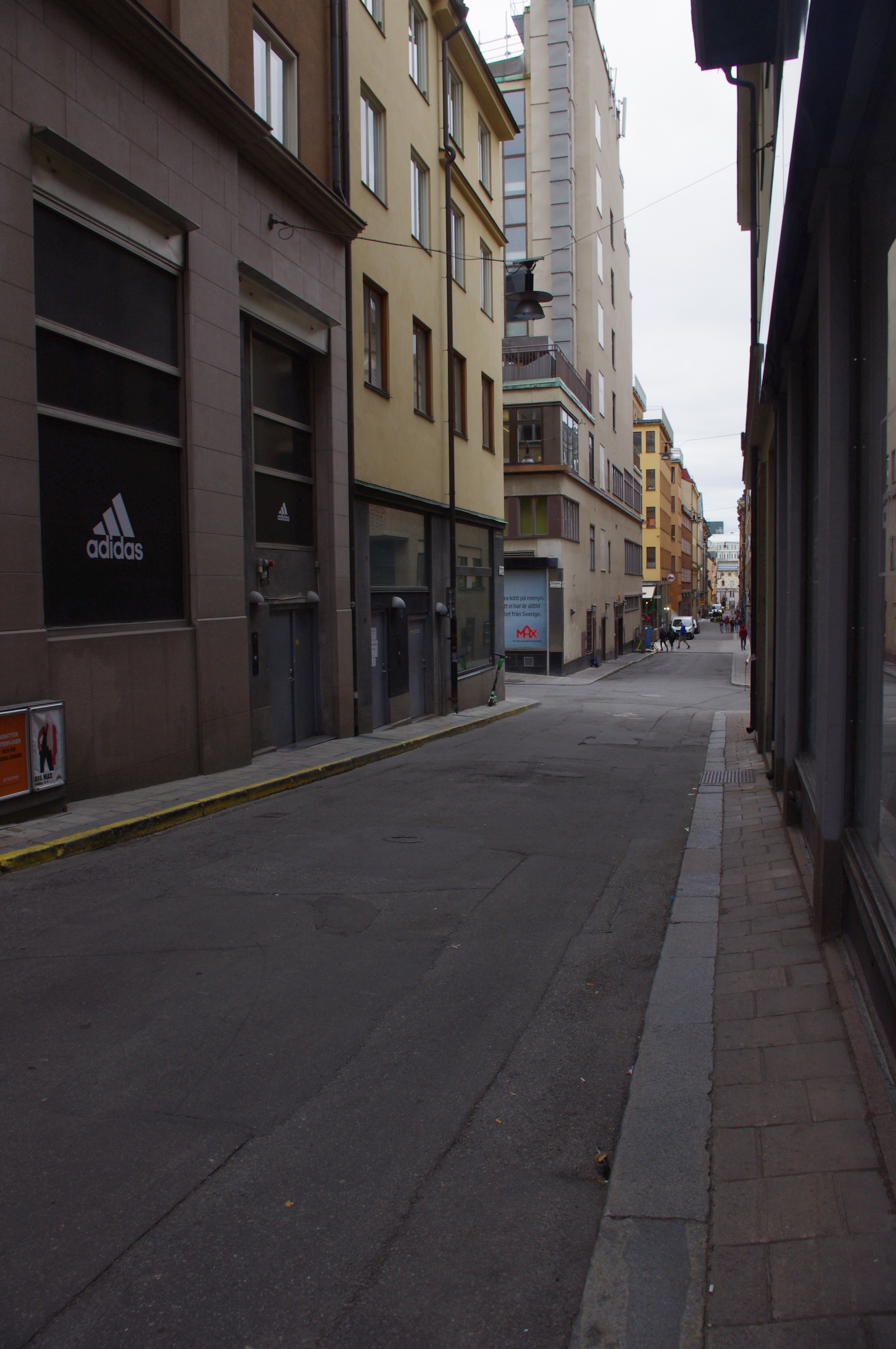
Apelbergsgatan behind Max Burgers where the final assault took place

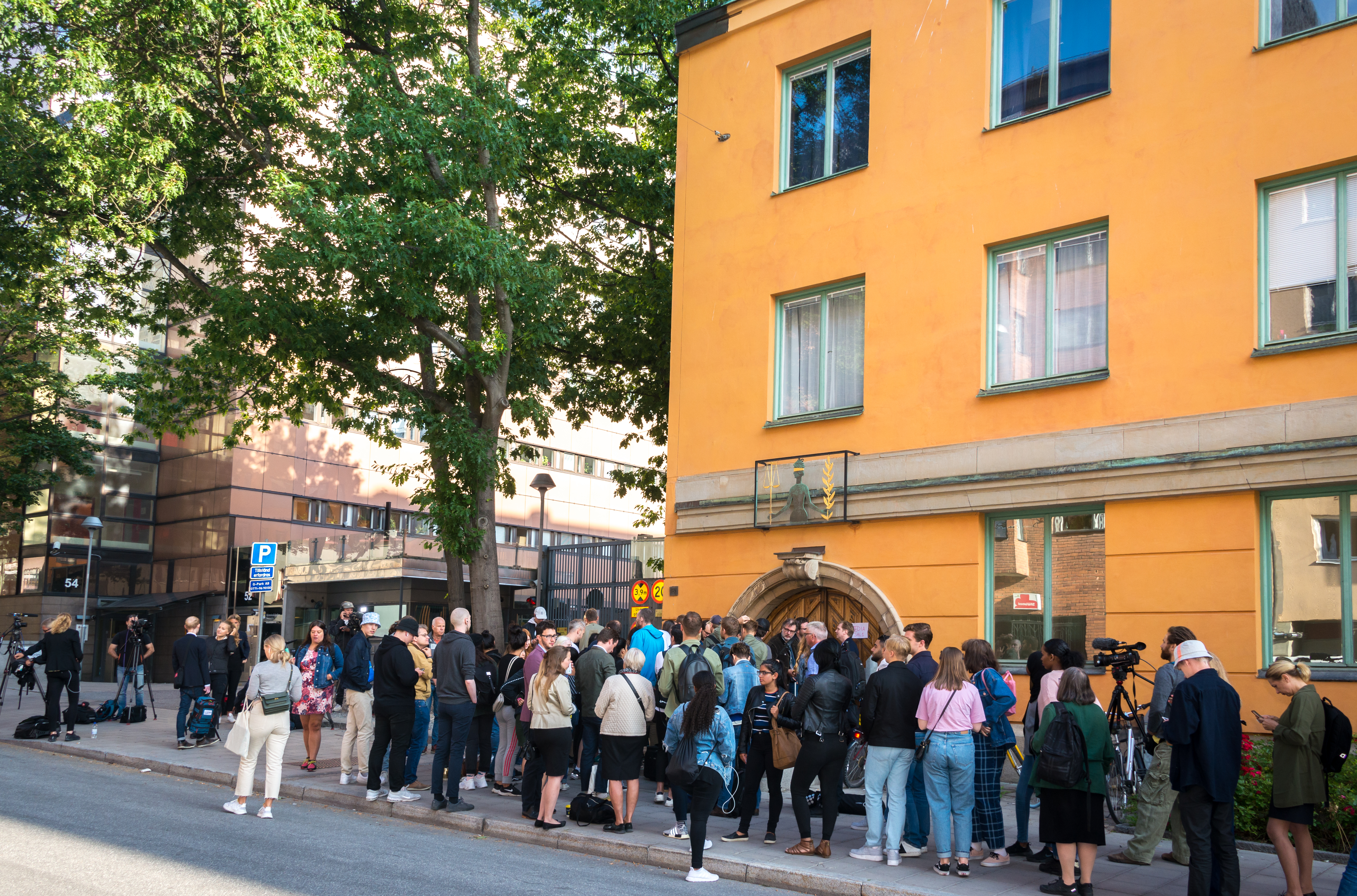
Media and audience outside Stockholm District Court where the trial against Mayers was being held

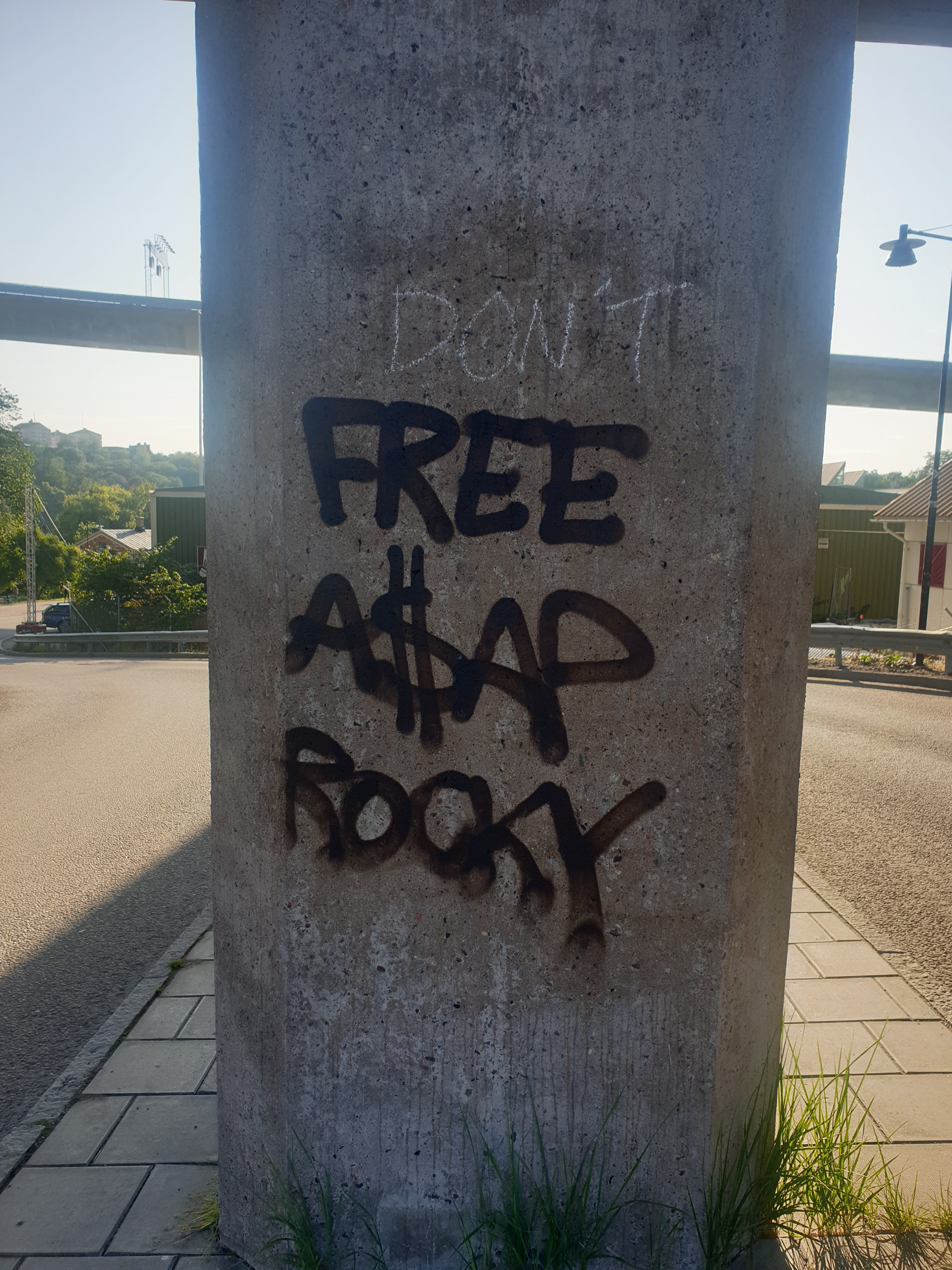
Graffiti about Mayers in Stockholm

In July 2019, Mayers was arrested initially for aggravated, then for simple assault in Stockholm, Sweden, after an altercation in the street against a man named Mustafa Jafari and another person that involved Mayers and three of his entourage on June 30. Jafari was beaten, kicked, and cut with broken bottles when down on the ground. He suffered several cuts, requiring stitches, and a fractured rib. Mayers uploaded two videos of the incident to Instagram. In the first, he and his entourage repeatedly ask two young men, including Jafari, to stop following them as the latter complains about his headphones. In the other, created from footage of assorted events, Jafari's headphones break during a scuffle, and he is seen hitting Mayers's bodyguard with them. A woman is also seen in the video, accusing the two men of groping. Henrik Olsson Lilja, the defense attorney for Mayers, maintained that his client acted in self-defense after being attacked by Jafari.

Mayers's bodyguard filed a counter-complaint against Jafari, and Jafari was initially suspected of harassment and minor assault or possibly attempted assault. The investigation against Jafari was dropped as prosecutors said he acted in self-defense, after being grabbed by the neck and pushed by the bodyguard. Mayers was arrested after being allowed to finish his gig at Stadion. As it was judged there was a risk that he may flee or tamper with evidence, he was kept in custody at Kronoberg Remand Prison until the trial, with two members of his entourage also under arrest. Mayers's ongoing tour was then put on hiatus due to the trial.

He was visited by personnel from the US embassy shortly after his arrest. Several US artists called for a boycott of Sweden due to the incident. A petition to release him was started. The family asked Al Sharpton for help. American President Donald Trump tweeted his support for Mayers, and it was later revealed by justice minister Morgan Johansson that Trump had threatened trade restrictions against Sweden if Mayers was not released. Former US ambassador to Sweden Mark Brzezinski suggested that the government should intervene and speculated that racism may have been the cause of the brawl. Foreign minister Margot Wallström said the government is not allowed to interfere citing Chapter 11 §3 of the Swedish constitutional Instrument of Government which explicitly forbids the interference of politicians, or unrelated government offices, in the work of the courts of law.

Mayers was convicted of assault, given a suspended prison sentence and asked to pay 12,500 kr ($1,270) in damages to the victim. The court could not decide who used the bottle, but said it was not a case of self-defense. As Mayers had already served over a month in jail for the incident before the sentence was handed out, it was determined that he did not need to serve any additional time. The conviction does not bar him from returning to Sweden.

=== Shooting in Hollywood ===
On April 20, 2022, Mayers was arrested by LAPD officers upon arriving to the Los Angeles International Airport after a vacation with his partner, Rihanna. He was arrested for a potential assault with a deadly weapon in a shooting that took place in Hollywood on November 6, 2021. The shooting victim, who survived the incident with only a graze to his knuckle, was reported to be former friend and collaborator Terell Ephron, better known as ASAP Relli. Bail was set at $550,000 and he was released shortly after.

After his arrest, detectives executed a warrant to search his home, gaining entry by using a pry bar to force the gate open. Detectives took several boxes from his home to use as evidence. Investigating officers did not find any shell casings at the scene and recovered no fingerprints from the 9mm casings Ephron later provided to police. The gun allegedly used was never found during a search of Mayers's residence. However, surveillance footage of the scene captured a man in a hooded sweatshirt, identified as the defendant, potentially holding a gun. On August 15, 2022, the Los Angeles County District Attorney's office filed charges against Mayers.

On November 20, 2023, a Los Angeles judge, M.L. Villar, determined that there was sufficient evidence for Mayers to stand trial after hearing roughly a day and a half of testimony from two witnesses during a preliminary court hearing. On January 8, 2024, Mayers entered a plea of not guilty, turning down a plea bargain of six months in jail, and risking a maximum sentence of over 20 years in prison. Mayers missed a hearing scheduled for March 6, 2024. During a court hearing which took place on May 23, Mayers had his trial set to start on October 21. The trial start date was pushed back to January 21, 2025. In a departure from typical practices in LA County courts, the judge allowed cameras to record almost the entirety of the trial. The defense team and witnesses stated that Mayers had used a prop gun that fired blanks. Jurors were instructed that they could acquit Mayers if he fired in self-defense. On February 18, Mayers was found not guilty.

== Discography ==
Studio albums

- Long. Live. ASAP (2013)
- At. Long. Last. ASAP (2015)
- Testing (2018)
- Don't Be Dumb (2026)

== Tours ==
=== Headlining ===
- LONGLIVEA$AP Tour (2012–2013)
- Injured Generation Tour (2019)
- Don't Be Dumb Tour (2026)

=== Co-headlining ===
- A$AP Mob Tour (with A$AP Mob members) (2012)
- Rocky and Tyler Tour (with Tyler, the Creator) (2015)
- 16 Day Trip Tour (with Wiz Khalifa) (2015)
- Too Cozy Tour (with A$AP Mob members) (2017)

=== Supporting ===
- Club Paradise Tour (for Drake) (2012)
- Diamonds World Tour (for Rihanna) (2013)
- Under the Influence of Music Tour (for Wiz Khalifa) (2013)
- Global Stadium Tour (for Red Hot Chili Peppers) (2022)

== Filmography ==
=== Film ===
Year	Title	Role	Notes
2015	Dope	Dom	
2015	Jeremy Scott: The People's Designer	Himself	Documentary
2016	Zoolander 2	Himself	
2016	Popstar: Never Stop Never Stopping	Himself	
2018	Monster	William King	
2020	Have a Good Trip: Adventures in Psychedelics	Himself	Documentary
2021	Stockholm Syndrome	Himself	Documentary
2021	A Man Named Scott	Himself	Documentary
2025	If I Had Legs I'd Kick You	Jamie	
2025	Highest 2 Lowest	Yung Felon	

=== Television ===
Year	Title	Role	Notes
2015	Comedy Bang! Bang!	Himself	Episode: "A$AP Rocky Wears a Black Button Up Jacket and Black Sneakers"
2016	Animals.	Bodega Cat 2 (voice)	Episode: "Flies."
2016	The Eric Andre Show	Himself	Episode: "Stacey Dash; Jack McBrayer"
2026	Saturday Night Live	Himself (musical guest)	Episode: "Finn Wolfhard/ASAP Rocky"

=== Video games ===
Year	Title	Role	Notes
2016	Marvel Avengers Academy	Falcon	Voice
2022	Need for Speed Unbound	Himself	Voice and likeness
2026	Fortnite	Himself	Likeness

=== Music videos ===
Year	Title	Artist	Role	Notes
2012	"National Anthem"	Lana Del Rey	John F. Kennedy	Lead role
2013	"Hold On, We're Going Home"	Drake	Guest Star	
2013	"White Walls" (featuring Schoolboy Q and Hollis)	Macklemore & Ryan Lewis	Guest Star	
2015	"Picture Me Rollin'"	Chris Brown	Guest Star	
2016	"Reminder"	The Weeknd	Guest Star	Featured on remix
2016	"What The Fuck Right Now"	Tyler, the Creator	Guest Star	Featured on remix
2016	"Surfin'"	Kid Cudi	Guest Star	
2016	"Nikes"	Frank Ocean	Guest Star	
2017	"See You Again"	Tyler, the Creator	Guest Star	
2017	"Who Dat Boy/911"	Tyler, the Creator	Guest Star	Featured on song
2018	"No Stylist"	French Montana	Guest Star	
2019	"Issues/Hold On"	Teyana Taylor	Guest Star	

== Awards and nominations ==
His accolades include three BET Awards, two MTV awards, and nominations for three Grammy Awards and six World Music Awards, for a total of five wins and 37 nominations overall.
