= Kokia discography =

- Studio albums: 14
- Extended plays: 4
- Live albums: 1
- Compilation albums: 5
- Tribute albums: 1
- Singles: 35
- Video albums: 21
- Music videos: 17

The discography of Japanese singer Kokia consists of fourteen studio albums, five compilations albums, four extended plays and 35 singles. Kokia has also released several music videos, mostly centred on her Mother Land management era with Victor Entertainment. Kokia has contributed to many soundtracks, mostly for games and anime. She has written several songs for other artists, most notably "Inori", a song sung by Mobile Suit Gundam 00 voice actor Ayahi Takagaki in the role of her character Feldt Grace.

Three of Kokia's albums and have sold over 10,000 copies, with her most successful album, 2003's Remember Me, selling 45,000 copies in Japan. Five of Kokia's singles have sold over 10,000 copies, with one of them, "The Power of Smile/Remember the Kiss," being certified gold by the RIAJ. Her 1999 single "Arigatō..." was a long-selling song digitally, and was certified gold in 2014.

== Studio albums ==
List of albums, with selected chart positions
Title	Album details	Peak positions		Sales (JPN) (Note: Sales provided by Oricon database and are rounded to the nearest thousand copies.)
Title	Album details	JPN	TWN East Asian	Sales (JPN)
Songbird	Released: July 16, 1999; Label: Pony Canyon; Formats: CD, digital download	—	—	
Trip Trip	Released: January 9, 2002; Label: Victor Entertainment; Formats: CD, digital download	—	—	
Remember Me	Released: November 12, 2003; Label: Victor; Formats: CD, digital download	15	—	45,000
Uta ga Chikara (歌がチカラ; "Songs Are Strength")	Released: July 21, 2004; Label: Victor; Formats: CD, digital download	23	—	20,000
Aigakikoeru: Listen for the Love	Released: November 29, 2006; Label: Victor; Formats: CD, digital download	67	6	6,000
The Voice	Released: February 20, 2008; Label: Victor; Formats: CD, digital download	42	—	8,000
Fairy Dance: Kokia Meets Ireland	Released: February 20, 2008; Label: Victor; Formats: CD, digital download	67	—	4,000
Christmas Gift	Released: October 22, 2008; Label: Victor; Formats: CD, digital download	56	—	3,000
Kokia Infinity Akiko: Balance	Released: March 18, 2009; Label: Victor; Formats: CD, digital download	51	—	5,000
Akiko Infinity Kokia: Balance	Released: March 18, 2009; Label: Anco&co; Formats: CD, digital download	—	—	
Real World	Released: March 31, 2010; Label: Victor; Formats: CD, digital download	44	—	4,000
Moment	Released: May 18, 2011; Label: Victor; Formats: CD, digital download	21	—	4,000
Where to Go My Love?	Released: March 20, 2013; Label: Victor; Formats: CD, digital download	38	—	3,000
I Found You	Released: March 18, 2015; Label: Victor; Formats: CD, digital download	—	—	3,000
Tokyo Mermaid	Released: 2018; Label: What's Music; Formats: CD, digital download		—	
"—" denotes items which were not released or did not chart in that region.

== Cover album ==
List of albums, with selected chart positions
Title	Album details	Peak positions	Sales (JPN)
Title	Album details	JPN	Sales (JPN)
Musique à la carte	Released: September 15, 2010; Label: Victor; Formats: CD, digital download	45	3,000

== Live album ==
List of extended plays
Title	Album details	Peak positions	Sales (JPN)
Title	Album details	JPN	Sales (JPN)
Color of Life	Released: February 12, 2014; Label: Victor; Formats: CD, digital download	64	1,000

== Compilation albums ==
List of albums, with selected chart positions
Title	Album details	Peak positions		Sales (JPN)
Title	Album details	JPN	TWN East Asian	Sales (JPN)
Pearl: The Best Collection	Released: February 1, 2006; Label: Victor; Formats: CD, digital download	19	12	19,000
Kokia Complete Collection 1998–1999	Pony Canyon era song collection; Released: September 17, 2008; Label: Pony Canyon; Formats: CD, digital download	254	—	600
Coquillage: The Best Collection II	Released: December 2, 2009; Label: Pony Canyon; Formats: CD, digital download	73	—	3,000
Pieces	Anime/game tie-up collection; Released: August 24, 2011; Label: Lantis; Formats: CD, digital download	62	—	2,000
Kokoro Bakari (心ばかり; "Just from the Heart")	B-side collection; Released: March 7, 2013; Label: Victor; Formats: CD, digital download	47	—	3,000

== Extended plays ==
List of extended plays, with selected chart positions
Title	Album details
A Piece of Christmas	Released: December 2003; Formats: CD
Birthday Present	Released: July 24, 2006; Formats: CD
Love Tears	Released: December 3, 2008; Label: Victor; Formats: digital download
Music Gift	Released: December 9, 2008; Label: Ancoro; Formats: CD

== Singles ==
List of singles, with selected chart positions
Title	Year	Peak chart positions	Sales (JPN)	Certifications	Album
Title	Year	Oricon Singles Charts	Sales (JPN)	Certifications	Album
"Aishiteiru Kara" (愛しているから; "Because I Love You")	1998	99	94		Songbird
"Ai no Field" (愛の輪郭(フィールド), Ai no Fīrudo; "Field of Love")	1998	—82	28		Brain Powerd Original Soundtrack 1
"Tears in Love"	1998	—80	83		Non-album single
"Arigatō..." (ありがとう...; "Thank You")	1999	—90	83	RIAJ (download): Gold	Songbird
"Tomoni" ("Together")	2001	—89	87		Trip Trip
"Say Hi!!"	2001	—23	56		Trip Trip
"Tenshi" (天使; "Angel")	2001	—890	85		Trip Trip
"Ningen tte Sonna Mono ne" (人間ってそんなものね; "People Are Just Like That")	2002	—848	79		Trip Trip
"Kawaranai Koto (Since 1976)" (かわらないこと; "Unchanging Thing")	2003	47	26,000		Remember Me
"The Power of Smile"	2003	15	32,000	RIAJ (physical): Gold	Remember Me
"Remember the Kiss"	2003	15	32,000	RIAJ (physical): Gold	Remember Me
"So Much Love for You"	2004	40	7,000		Uta ga Chikara
"Yume ga Chikara" (夢がチカラ; "Dreams Are Strength")	2004	30	8,000		Uta ga Chikara
"Dandelion"	2005	84	4,000		Pearl: The Best Collection
"Time to Say Goodbye"	2005	54	3,000		Pearl: The Best Collection
"Ai no Melody" (愛のメロディー; "Melody of Love")	2006	30	13,000		Pearl: The Best Collection
"Chōwa Oto (With Reflection)" (調和; "Harmony, Sound")	2006	30	13,000		Pearl: The Best Collection
"Arigatō... (The Pearl Edition)"	2007	139	2,000		Pearl: The Best Collection
"Watashi ni Dekiru Koto" (私にできること; "What I Can Do")	2007	—018	8,000		The Voice
"Follow the Nightingale"	2007	33	12,000		The Voice
"Tatta Hitotsu no Omoi" (たった1つの想い; "Just One Mind")	2008	38	10,000		Gunslinger Girl: Il Teatrino Vocal Album
"Karma"	2009	45	4,000		Phantom: Requiem for the Phantom Original Soundtrack Vol. 1
"Kimi o Sagashite" (君をさがして; "Searching for You")	2009	84—	8391		Real World
"Last Love Song"	2009	84—	8391		Real World
"Transparent"	2009	105	900		Phantom: Requiem for the Phantom Original Soundtrack Vol. 2
"Single Mother"	2009	—80	937		Real World
"Christmas no Hibiki" (クリスマスの響き; "Echo of Christmas")	2009	—80	937		Real World
"Kodoku na Ikimono" (孤独な生きもの; "Lonely Things")	2010	—01	81		Real World
"Ano Hi no Watashi ni" (あの日の私に; "To Me on That Day")	2010	—01	81		Real World
"Fate"	2010	85	1,000		Broken Blade Bangai-hen Drama CD
"Road to Glory (Long Journey)"	2010	92	3,000		Real World
"Sakura no Ki no Shita" (桜の樹の下; "Under the Cherry Tree")	2011	72	1,000		Non-album singles
"Hikari no Hō e" (光の方へ; "To the Light")	2011	72	1,000		Non-album singles
"Fate"	2011	85	1,000		Broken Blade Bangai-hen Drama CD
"Sekai o Tsutsumu Ribbon in Our Heart" (世界を包む; "Ribbon in Our Heart, Wrapping the World")	2011	—84	84		Kokoro Bakari
"New Day, New Life"	2012	29	4,000		Non-album singles
"Hikari o Atsumete" (光をあつめて; "Collecting the Light")	2012	45	2,000		Non-album singles
"Memorial Days"	2012	66	1,000		Non-album singles
"Yume Oibito" (夢追人; "Dream Chaser")	2012	156	400		Non-album singles
"Battle of Destiny"	2013	33	3,000		Non-album singles
"Kioku no Hikari" (記憶の光; "Light of Memory")	2013	47	2,000		Non-album singles
"—" denotes items which were released before the creation of the Billboard Japan Hot 100, items that did not chart or items that were ineligible to chart because no physical edition was released.

== Video albums ==
List of media, with selected chart positions
Title	Album details	Peak positions
Title	Album details	JPN DVD
Jewel: The Best Video Collection	Released: July 24, 2006; Label: Victor; Formats: DVD	100
Live in Paris 2007 Les couleurs de Paris	Released: May 5, 2007; Label: Anco&co; Formats: DVD	—
The Voice: 10th Anniversary Concert	Released: May 5, 2008; Label: Victor; Formats: DVD	48
Kokia World Tour 2009 Infinity	Released: July 22, 2009; Label: Anco&co; Formats: DVD	—
Wherever I Am: World Tour 2009 in Europe	Released: September 23, 2009; Label: Victor; Formats: DVD	86
Oto no Tabi Bito Kokia Concert Tour 2010	Released: August 1, 2010; Label: Anco&co; Formats: DVD	—
Moment no Moment (momentのmoment)	Released: May 18, 2011; Label: Anco&co; Formats: DVD	—
The 5th Season Concert	Released: September 14, 2011; Label: Anco&co; Formats: DVD	—
Music Like a Prayer	Released: March 7, 2012; Label: Anco&co; Formats: DVD	—
History	Released: August 31, 2012; Label: Anco&co; Formats: DVD	—
Color of Life	Released: September 10, 2013; Label: Anco&co; Formats: DVD	—
spring concert ～Release～	Released: August 13, 2014; Label: Anco&co; Formats: DVD	—
Falling in Love with the Orchestra	Released: March 18, 2015; Label: Anco&co; Formats: DVD	—
spring concert ～Oishii Otowo Tabetanara～	Released: October 1, 2015; Label: Anco&co; Formats: DVD	—
Kawaguchiko Concert Morito Utau Sorato Tsunagaru	Released: February 1, 2016; Label: Anco&co; Formats: DVD	—
Heart Touching Music	Released: July 1, 2016; Label: Anco&co; Formats: DVD	—
Layers～lights and shadows～	Released: January 23, 2017; Label: Anco&co; Formats: Blu-ray Disc	—
Bird Watching	Released: February 21, 2018; Label: Anco&co; Formats: DVD	—
20th Anniversary Concert Beyond Imagination	Released: July 27, 2018; Label: Anco&co; Formats: Blu-ray Disc	—
Journey to Me	Released: March 7, 2019; Label: Anco&co; Formats: DVD	—
KOKIA 2021 Live stream concert - THE MISSING PIECE - & Missing You	Released: October 5, 2021; Label: Anco&co; Formats: Blu-ray Disc	—

== Music videos ==
Unlike many popular musicians, Kokia does not have very many music videos. She has three main eras of music videos: her initial Pony Canyon era clips (1998), videos filmed when under Gai Records management (2000–2002) and videos filmed while working with Mother Land management (2003–2006). Since switching to her self-managed label Anco&co, Kokia has only filmed one music video, "The Woman," while in the Tunisian Safari.

Kokia's Pony Canyon videos were featured in the DVD on Kokia Complete Collection 1998–1999. Her Mother Land videos were compiled together and released as Jewel: The Best Video Collection in 2006. Her Gai Records videos have not been released to DVD.

Year	Title	Director(s)
1998	"Aishiteiru Kara"	
1998	"Tears in Love"	
2000	"Goes on Forever" (ЯKS feat. Kokia)	
2000	"Melody" (ЯKS feat. Kokia)	
2001	"Tomoni"	
2001	"Say Hi!!"	Smith (スミス)
2001	"Tenshi"	
2002	"Ningen tte Sonna Mono ne"	
2003	"Kawaranai Koto (Since 1976)"	Jun Hara (原淳)
2003	"The Power of Smile"	Shin'ichi Kudō (工藤伸一)
2003	"Remember the Kiss (Duet "Kokia & Piano")"	Tsuyoshi Inoue (井上強)
2004	"So Much Love for You"	Shin'ichi Kudō
2004	"Yume ga Chikara"	Jun Hara
2005	"Dandelion"	Tetsuma Maki (牧鉄馬)
2005	"Time to Say Goodbye"	Kōta Nakamaru (中丸航太)
2006	"Ai no Melody"	Takatoshi Tsuchiya (土屋隆俊)
2010	"The Woman"	Iori Iwamoto

== Other appearances ==
Kokia has appeared on many compilation albums, either with songs performed by her (often also written by her) or as a background vocalist.

Release	Artist	Title	Notes	Album
1998	Kokia	"For Little Tail"	Game Tail Concerto theme song	Road to Glory ~long journey~ single
1999	Kokia	"Nesia no Tabibito: Umi to Kaze to Hito no Uta" (ネシアの旅人～海と風と人の唄; "'Nesian Travellers: A Song of Sea, Sky and People")	TV show Nesia no Tabibito theme song	Nesia no Tabibito Original Soundtrack
2000	Kokia	"Sayonara wa Iwanaide" (さよならは言わないで; "Don't Say Goodbye")	Anime Karakurizōshi Ayatsuri Sakon insert song	Karakurizōshi Ayatsuri Sakon Original Soundtrack II
2000	Kokia & Yoko Ueno	"Currents"	Game Suikoden II image song	Suikoden II Ongakushū Orizzonte
2000	ЯKS feat. Kokia	"Goes on Forever"	Released as single, Oricon #70	Kanata Made
2000	ЯKS feat. Kokia	"Kaze" (風, Wind)	"Goes on Forever" B-side	Kanata Made
2000	ЯKS feat. Kokia	"Melody"	Released as single, Oricon #75	Kanata Made
2000	ЯKS feat. Kokia	"Jiyū na Hito" (自由な人; "Free Person")	"Melody" B-side.	Kanata Made
2000	ЯKS feat. Kokia	"Gekitsū" (激痛; "Sharp Pain")		Kanata Made
2000	Hideki Saijo	"Toki no Kizahashi" (時のきざはし; "Stairs of Time")	Background vocals. Released as single, Oricon #46	Planets: 30th Anniversary 12 Songs
2002	Vita Nova	"Rom no Aoi Hibiki" (ロムの青い響き; "The Blue Echo of Rom")	Background vocals	Shiawase
2003	Fake?	"Care"	Background vocals	Tomorrow Today
2004	Kokia	"Desperado"	Eagles cover, later featured on Pearl: The Best Collection	Hotel Venus Original Soundtrack
2004	Kokia	"Bom Bom!! Drive de Kimeyō" (Bom bom!! ドライブで決めよう; "Boom Boom!! Let's Go for a Drive")	Produced for Toyota Isis promotion, promo only	Tokyo Toyota Original CD Smile & Heart
2005	Roppongi Dansei Gasshō-dan Club with Kokia	"Peace Road" (ピース・ロード, Pīsu Rōdo)		–
2005	Yuri Hiranuma feat. Kokia	"Daiji na no wa Tsuyoku Omou Koto" (大事なのは強く想うこと; "Important Things Are Ones You Think About a Lot")		Mada Mienu Eiga no Tame no Ongaku
2007	Kokia	"Ai: Wazuka na Omoide" (藍～僅かな思い出; "Indigo: Small Thoughts")	Anime Red Garden insert songs.	Red Garden Original Soundtrack
2007	Kokia	"Katsu: Mabara na Hikari" (褐～まばらな光; "Brown: Sparse Light")	Anime Red Garden insert songs.	Red Garden Original Soundtrack
2007	Kokia	"Kurenai: Negai" (紅～願い; "Crimson: Wish")	Anime Red Garden insert songs.	Red Garden Original Soundtrack
2007	Kokia	"Shiro: Watashitachi no Hibiki" (白～私達の響き; "White: Our Echo")	Anime Red Garden insert songs.	Red Garden Original Soundtrack
2007	Kokia	"Sumire: Hi to Tomo ni" (菫～陽と共に; "Violet: Together with the Sun")	Anime Red Garden insert songs.	Red Garden Original Soundtrack
2008	Kokia	"Anata to Deatte" (あなたと出逢って; "Meeting You by Chance")	Book Girl inspired song	Bungaku Shōjo to Yumeutsutsu no Melody
2009	Kokia	"Demon's Souls"	Game Demon's Souls opening theme song	Demon's Souls Soundtrack
2009	Kokia	"Return to Slumber"	Game Demon's Souls ending theme song	Demon's Souls Soundtrack
2010	Kokia	"Exec_Rebirthia=Protocol/."	Game Ar tonelico III insert songs.	Sakiya=Rumei Ar tonelico III Hymmnos Concert Side Ao
2010	Kokia	"Exec_Cosmoflips/."	Game Ar tonelico III insert songs.	Sakiya=Rumei Ar tonelico III Hymmnos Concert Side Ao
2010	Kokia	"Hikari no Naka ni" (光の中に; "In the Light")	Game Ar tonelico III insert songs.	Sakiya=Rumei Ar tonelico III Hymmnos Concert Side Ao
2010	Kokia	"Kotonoha" (言の葉; "Words")	OVA Book Girl Memoire I ending theme song	Kotonoha (extended play)
2013	Paul Ruskay feat. Kokia	"Strike Suit Zero Main Theme."	Game Strike Suit Zero theme song	Strike Suit Zero Original Soundtrack
2013	Paul Ruskay feat. Kokia	"Ancient A.I"	Game Strike Suit Zero background music	Strike Suit Zero Original Soundtrack
2013	Paul Ruskay feat. Kokia	"Procession of the Lanterns"	Game Strike Suit Zero background music	Strike Suit Zero Original Soundtrack
2013	Paul Ruskay feat. Kokia	"Dr. Abram's Discovery"	Game Strike Suit Zero background music	Strike Suit Zero Original Soundtrack
2013	Paul Ruskay feat. Kokia	"Earth's Fate"	Game Strike Suit Zero background music	Strike Suit Zero Original Soundtrack
2013	Paul Ruskay feat. Kokia	"Unity with the Core"	Game Strike Suit Zero background music	Strike Suit Zero Original Soundtrack
2013	Paul Ruskay feat. Kokia	"Credits"	Game Strike Suit Zero ending theme song	Strike Suit Zero Original Soundtrack

== Songwriting credits ==
Throughout her career, Kokia has occasionally written musical pieces for other artists, either lyrics, musical composition or both.

Release	Artist	Title	Notes	Album
2000	Saori Yuki, Sachiko Yasuda	"Hatsukoi" (初恋; "First Love")	Wrote lyrics	Uta Uta Uta Vol. 5: Ashita no Omoide
2005	Hiroshi Ashino	"Larme" (ラルム, Rarumu; Fr: "Tears")	Wrote music	La Brise de la Côte d'Azur
2006	Yuki Otake	"Tokai no Hitsuji" (都会の羊; "City Sheep")	Wrote lyrics/music	Nemuru Kujaku
2009	Ayahi Takagaki comes across Feldt Grace	"Inori" (祈り†; "Prayer")	Wrote music/lyrics, Oricon #53	Inori/Justice (single)
2009	Ayahi Takagaki comes across Feldt Grace	"Justice"	Wrote music/lyrics, Oricon #53	Inori/Justice (single)
