= Karma (Kokia song) =

Single by Kokia

from the album Phantom: Requiem for the Phantom Original Sound Track Vol. 1
- B-side: "Insonnia"
- Released: April 22, 2009
- Genre: Neoclassical (dark wave)
- Length: 5:15
- Label: Lantis
- Songwriter: Kokia
- Producers: Shunji Inoue (executive, Lantis); Shigeyuki Hirano (Anco&co); Yoshiyuki Ito

Kokia singles chronology
"Tatta Hitotsu no Omoi" (2008)	"Karma" (2009)	"Kimi o Sagashite/Last Love Song" (2009)

"Karma" is a song by Kokia, released as her 20th single on April 22, 2009. It was used as the first opening theme song for the anime Phantom: Requiem for the Phantom, and would later feature in an edited version on the anime's soundtrack. Her song "Transparent" would be used as the second ending theme song for the same anime.

The song was covered on the album Exit Trance Presents Speed Anime Trance Best 8 by MK feat. R. Cena, later in November 2009.

== Background ==
"Karma" was released only a month after Kokia's 9th and 10th studio albums Kokia Infinity Akiko: Balance and Akiko Infinity Kokia: Balance. The single was her first release through anime retailer Lantis, as opposed to her usual release label Victor Entertainment. Kokia had released game/anime theme songs on a different label twice in her career: once through Victor Entertainment in 1998 while she was still signed to Pony Canyon ("Ai no Field" for anime Brain Powerd) and once through Marvelous Entertainment in 2008 ("Tatta Hitotsu no Omoi" for Gunslinger Girl: Il Teatrino).

Kokia had sung many songs for anime in the past. This was the third time her music had been used as an opening theme, after "Chōwa Oto (With Reflection)" in 2006 for the film Origin: Spirits of the Past, and "Tatta Hitotsu no Omoi" for Gunslinger Girl: Il Teatrino.

== Recording ==
"Karma" was recorded in January 2009, while Kokia was recording Kokia Infinity Akiko: Balance and Akiko Infinity Kokia: Balance. The song was recorded with a 4422 string section, a type of string arrangement featuring four lead violinists, four secondary vilionists, two viola players and two cellists. The song has Kokia's vocals layered twelve times to create the background vocals. The single's B-side "Insonnia" was recorded by Kokia on March 24.

Both songs were recorded in collaboration with veteran anime composer and songwriter, Masumi Itō, under the stage name Hikaru Nanase. "Karma" was arranged in collaboration with Kokia, however Kokia created "Insonnia" around a background instrumental piece supplied to her by Itō.

== Composition ==
"Karma"
A sample from chorus of Kokia's original version of "Karma."

"Insonnia"
A sample from the B-side on the single, an Italian language lullaby.

MK feat. R. Cena - "Karma"
A sample from the trance remix cover of "Karma," featured on the compilation album Exit Trance Presents Speed Anime Trance Best 8.

"Karma" is a mid-tempo atmospheric neoclassical (dark wave) song. It begins with Kokia's vocals in chorus with themselves, backed with synthesiser sounds, harp and a string section. As the chorus begins, layers of strings and percussion are added. Only two choruses are present in the song, with the other sections composed of either extended instrumentals, a central refrain and the initial verse repeated. After the first chorus, the majority of strings and percussion cease, except for the refrain, which uses the instrumental style from the chorus. The sections without a vocal lead mostly feature Kokia singing softly with non-lyrical sounds, however some sections are centred on the string section only. The end of the song features an extended version of the introduction, however with minimal vocals from Kokia. Kokia described the song as "a wonderful orchestra-lead melody, with a somehow suspicious atmosphere."

The lyrics describe somebody on their deathbed considering the concept of karma in terms of fate. The protagonist of the song asks "how many times have I fallen into a cycle of the same things," noting how their heart always leads back to the same things when perusing such memories. They describe life to be a spiral, where rebirth is "continued loitering." The lyrics talk about how in the future the person will not be able to remember this moment of clarity when they escaped the "wasteland of oblivion."

The B-side "Insonnia" is an Italian language lullaby. It is backed by synthesised harp sounds, piano and atmospheric synths. Kokia attempted to create a "feeling of being inside of a lasting dream" through the lyrics and melody of the song. The lyrics ask simple questions about where the dreamer is, noting that the person is still dreaming, and how they wait for someone who has not come yet. This is the second time Kokia has recorded a song in Italian, after "Il Mare dei Suoni" from her album The Voice in 2007.

== Chart reception ==
The song debuted at #29 on Oricon's daily singles chart, staying for much of the week in the top 30. It dropped out of the top 50 after five days. In its first week, the single peaked at #45, selling 2,300 copies. The single spent a further week in the top 100 at #71, and two more weeks between 100 and 200 (at #101 and #127 respectively). In its total four week run, the single sold a 4,300 copies.

== Track listing ==
No.	Title	Writer(s)	Arranger(s)	Length
1.	"Karma"	Kokia	Hikaru Nanase	5:15
2.	"Insonnia"	Kokia	Nanase	3:37
3.	"Karma (Inst)"	Kokia	Nanase	4:06
4.	"Insonnia (Instrumental)"	Kokia	Nanase	3:37
Total length:				17:44

== Japan Sales Rankings ==
Release	Chart	Peak position	First week sales	Sales total	Chart run
April 22, 2009	Oricon daily singles chart	29			
April 22, 2009	Oricon weekly singles chart	45	2,400	4,300	4 weeks
April 22, 2009	Oricon yearly singles chart				

== Personnel ==
- Shigeyuki Hirano - producer (Anco&co)
- Shunji Inoue - executive producer
- Yoshiyuki Ito - producer
- Ayumi Kamo - digital work
- Kokia - chorus vocalist, songwriter, vocalist
- Makiko Kojima - cover illustration retoucher
- Hikaru Nanase - arranger
- Eiichi Nishizawa - engineer
- OverDriveDesign - art direction, single jacket cover design
- Yūko Sakayori - cover jacket coordination
- Mutsumi Sasaki - cover illustration original manga artist
