= Love Tears =

EP by Kokia
- Released: 3 December 2008
- Recorded: 2006–2008
- Genre: J-pop, folk
- Length: 21:49
- Label: Victor Entertainment
- Producer: Kokia

Kokia chronology
Christmas Gift (2008)	Love Tears (2008)	Music Gift (2008)

Love Tears is an EP released by Kokia only through digital download service iTunes, on 3 December 2008. It features a collection of rarities featured as bonus tracks on Kokia releases between 2006 and 2008. Due to the success of this digital EP, Kokia decided to release three singles from her Real World album as four track digital only EPs, with booklets created by Kokia, in a similar manner to Love Tears.

== Song sources ==
Most of the songs had been released previously as bonus tracks on the Japanese versions of Kokia albums. "Arigatō... (from Kokia 2007)" originally came from the Japanese edition of Aigakikoeru: Listen for the Love, released in 2007. "Watashi ni Dekiru Koto" was originally released as a single limited to the area around Kashiwazaki, Niigata that suffered in the 2007 Chūetsu offshore earthquake in September 2007, however featured as a bonus track on her 2008 album The Voice. "Remember the Kiss (Dedicated to "New" NY)" is from her free release EP Music Gift that was given out on the streets of New York, however originally featured as a bonus track on her 2008 Christmas album Christmas Gift. "Nukumori (Aigakikoeru) (with Strings)" is an unpublished recording of the same titled song from Kokia's 2006 album Aigakikoeru: Listen for the Love, however with added string instruments. This version was featured in Kokia's short film Ojiisan no Tulip (おじいちゃんのチューリップ, Granddad's Tulips).

== Conception ==
The release of the EP was timed to be released when her song "Watashi ni Dekiru Koto" was featured in a segment on the TV show Daremo Shiranai Nakeru Uta. The show was broadcast on 9 December, featuring an in studio live performance by Kokia of the song. "Arigatō..." was featured in a similar program in 2007, in a segment of the variety show Kawazu-kun no Kensaku Seikatsu called Nakeru 2 Channel. Kokia considered the release to be a good entry for people who were unfamiliar with her music. The jacket and digital booklet were designed by Kokia herself.

== Track listing ==
All songs written by Kokia.

No.	Title	Arranger(s)	Length
1.	"Arigatō... (from Kokia 2007) (ありがとう…（from KOKIA 2007）, Thank You)"	Kokia	5:29
2.	"Watashi ni Dekiru Koto (私にできること, What I Can Do)"	Kokia	4:51
3.	"Nukumori (Aigakikoeru) (with Strings) (ぬくもり～aigakikoeru～（with strings）, Warmth (Listen for the Love))"	Kokia	5:08
4.	"Remember the Kiss (Dedicated to "New" NY)"	Toney Rhodes	6:00
