= Musique a la Carte =

Studio album by Kokia
- Released: September 15, 2010
- Recorded: 2002–2010
- Genres: J-pop, folk
- Length: 59:38
- Label: Victor Entertainment
- Producer: Kokia

Kokia chronology
Real World (2010)	Musique a la Carte (2010)

Musique à la Carte (French for Music from the Menu) is an album released by Kokia, on September 15, 2010. It is an album composed entirely of covers of songs by Western artists.

== Background ==
Of the 13 songs on the album, 8 were already released before the album in Kokia's discography. The earliest, "Moonlight Shadow," was released in 2002 on Kokia's single "Ningen tte Sonna Mono ne." Four are from Kokia's 2008 10th anniversary projects Fairy Dance: Kokia Meets Ireland and Christmas Gift, and three are B-sides from the 'life trilogy' of digital singles released prior to her 2010 studio album Real World.

Of the five new recordings, three were recorded in Ireland with Sean Whelan ("Love Me Tender," "Over the Rainbow" and "Scarborough Fair").

== Track listing ==
No.	Title	Writer(s)	Arranger(s)	Length
1.	"What a Wonderful World" (Louis Armstrong, from "Kimi o Sagashite" (君をさがして?, "Searching for You"), 2009)	Bob Thiele, George David Weiss	Kiyohide Ura	4:37
2.	"Hallelujah" (Leonard Cohen, from "Christmas Gift", 2008)	Leonard Cohen	Ura	4:42
3.	"Amazing Grace" (from "Christmas Gift", 2008)	John Newton	Kokia	4:49
4.	"Love Me Tender" (Elvis Presley, New Recording)	Ken Darby, Vera Matson, George R. Poulton, Elvis Presley	Kokia	4:36
5.	"Teo Torriatte (Let Us Cling Together)" (Queen, from "Christmas Gift", 2008)	Brian May	Sunny	4:34
6.	"Over the Rainbow" (Judy Garland, New Recording)	Harold Arlen, E.Y. Harburg	Kokia	4:12
7.	"Black Is the Colour" (from "Fairy Dance: Kokia Meets Ireland", 2008)	Traditional	Sean Whelan	3:47
8.	"Moonlight Shadow" (Mike Oldfield, from "Ningen tte Sonna Mono ne" (人間ってそんなものね?, "People Are Just Like That")", 2002)	Mike Oldfield	Susumu Nishikawa	4:07
9.	"Scarborough Fair" (New Recording)	Traditional	Kokia	4:30
10.	"Bye Bye Blackbird" (Standard, New Recording)	Mort Dixon, Ray Henderson	Kokia	2:36
11.	"The Long and Winding Road" (The Beatles, from "Kodoku na Ikimono" (孤独な生きもの?, "Lonely Things"), 2010)	Lennon–McCartney	Yasuhia Yamamoto	3:38
12.	"Bridge over Troubled Water" (Simon & Garfunkel, New Recording)	Paul Simon	Ura	5:44
13.	"Smile" (Charlie Chaplin, from "Single Mother", 2009)	John Turner, Geoffrey Parsons, Charlie Chaplin	Ura	4:08
14.	"Desperado" (Eagles, from "Original Sound Track: Hotel Venus", 2004)	Glenn Frey, Don Henley	Sawachika	3:38

== Chart rankings ==
Chart (2010)	Peak position
Oricon daily albums	15
Oricon weekly albums	45

=== Reported sales ===
Chart	Amount
Oricon physical sales	3,200
