= Follow the Nightingale =

Single by Kokia

from the album The Voice
- B-side: "'Say Goodbye & Good Day'"
- Released: November 21, 2007
- Genre: Neoclassical (dark wave)
- Length: 4:36
- Label: Flying Dog (Victor Entertainment)
- Songwriter: Kokia
- Producer: Kokia

Kokia singles chronology
"Watashi ni Dekiru Koto" (2007)	"Follow the Nightingale" (2007)	"Tatta Hitotsu no Omoi" (2008)

"Follow the Nightingale" is a song by Kokia, released as her 18th single on November 21, 2007. The song, along with the single's B-side "Say Goodbye & Good Day," were used as the opening and ending theme songs for the Nintendo DS game Tales of Innocence.

The song was featured on Kokia's sixth studio album, The Voice. "Say Goodbye & Good Day" was present as a bonus track on the French edition, but not on the Japanese edition. "Say Goodbye & Good Day" also features on Kokia's 2009 greatest hits collection Coquillage: The Best Collection II.

Kokia chose the theme of the single's cover to be of an oasis, with the theme that "all animals, people and trees need water to survive."

== Composition ==
Kokia likens the song to "Chowa Oto" from her Trip Trip album. She described the song as being like a magnificent film's soundtrack, such as Peter Jackson's Lord of the Rings trilogy. She also describes the song as being "like a horse running through a great plain."

"Follow the Nightingale" is an upbeat song influenced by dark wave neoclassical music, with two major movements. The first movement (occurring three times, 0:00-0:40, 1:19-1:50 and 2:17-3:23) are quiet, featuring light chorus work by Kokia, the harp, stringed instruments and the piano. The final section of this movement features an extended bridge, with Kokia singing in operatic vocals. The second movement (0:40-1:19, 1:50-2:17 and 3:57-4:36) begins with the sound of maracas and Kokia's voice amplified several times with layered chorus work. It then moves into a complex arrangement of strings and drums/cymbals, along with Kokia's chorus work and the maracas.

The lyrics of the song come in two different sections: coded Japanese and standard Japanese. Kokia describes these coded sections as "perplexing riddle words." The standard Japanese is written in capital letters in a roman script (such as the first line, "REGNIH REGNIH CI AN ETTAM REGNIH ETTAM ETTAM"). The standard Japanese only appears in the first movement's second and third sections, while the coded lyrics appear throughout the song.

Kokia has written coded lyrics previously, for her song "Chowa Oto" (in which each syllable was reversed). However, this cipher does not work for the lyrics of "Follow the Nightingale." If each individual letter is reversed, some comprehensible lyrics are able to be read (such as "ATTAMIJAHAHIRA TAGONOM" becoming "monogatari ha hajimatta" (物語は始まった, The Story Has Begun), and "ATERA REGANAHIAS" becoming "sai ha nagerareta" (骰は投げられた, The Dice Were Able to Have Been Thrown)), however this does not work in all cases.

"Say Goodbye & Good Day," in comparison, is a pop song, arranged with a standard band backing (bass, guitar, drums) and piano, with without complex chorus work. Kokia described "Say Goodbye & Good Day" as being a refreshing song. On her decision to use the word "goodbye" (despite its sad implications), she notes she chose it to give the feeling of "advancing to the next step."

== Promotion ==
"Follow the Nightingale" and "Say Goodbye & Good Day" were used as the theme song for the game Tales of Innocence, which was released 16 days later on the 6th of December.

Kokia featured in several minor media outlets in promotion of the single, such as internet TV show Ameba Studio on November 24, the NHK TV show Manga Yawa on the 29th, and on the Nippon Broadcasting radio show Mucomi on December the 6th. She also had a feature article in Shūkan Famitsū in the December 14 issue.

On December 22, 2007, Kokia performed "Follow the Nightingale" at the 2008 Jump Festa anime/game expo.

== Reception ==
The song debuted at #23 on Oricon's daily singles chart, peaking at #22. For her first week, Kokia's single peaked at #33, selling 4,600 copies. The single charted for nine weeks, selling a total of 12,000 copies in this time. Because of this, "Follow the Nightingale" is Kokia's fourth best selling single, after "The Power of Smile/Remember the Kiss," "Kawaranai Koto (Since 1976)" and "Ai no Melody/Chōwa Oto (With Reflection)".

== Track listing ==
No.	Title	Writer(s)	Arranger(s)	Length
1.	"Follow the Nightingale"	Kokia	Taisuke Sawachika	4:36
2.	"Say Goodbye & Good Day"	Kokia	Sawachika	6:06
3.	"Follow the Nightingale (Original Karaoke)"	Kokia	Sawachika	4:36
4.	"Say Goodbye & Good Day (Original Karaoke)"	Kokia	Sawachika	6:07
Total length:				18:45

== Japan Sales Rankings ==
Release	Chart	Peak position	First week sales	Sales total	Chart run
November 21, 2007	Oricon daily singles chart	22			
November 21, 2007	Oricon weekly singles chart	33	4,600	12,000	9 weeks
November 21, 2007	Oricon yearly singles chart				

== Personnel ==
"Follow the Nightingale"
A sample from the second movement of "Follow the Nightingale."

"Say Goodbye & Good Day"
The chorus of "Say Goodbye & Good Day."

- Katsuhiko "Chara" Asano - recording & mixing engineer
- Shigeyuki Hirano - director (Anco & Co.)
- Noriko Inose - photographer
- Masao Itō - head of promotion (Flying Dog/JVC Entertainment)
- Hiroshi Kawasaki - mastering engineer
- Kokia - performer, producer, styling, songwriter
- Keiichi Nozaki - director (Flying Dog/JVC Entertainment)
- Kaoru Nyūi - hair & makeup
- Shiro Sasaki - executive producer (Flying Dog/JVC Entertainment)
- Masakazu Sato - sales promoter (Victor Entertainment)
- Taisuke Sawachika - arranger
- Seishi Takeuchi - post pro editor (Victor Entertainment)
- E. Yaguchi - arti direction, design
- Hiroshi Yamashita - sales promoter (Flying Dog/JVC Entertainment)
