= Tatta Hitotsu no Omoi =

Single by Kokia

from the album Gunslinger Girl: Il Teatrino Vocal Album
- B-side: "'Umaretate no Shiro'"
- Released: January 23, 2008
- Genre: J-pop
- Length: 4:06
- Label: Marvelous Entertainment
- Songwriter: Kokia
- Producer: Kokia

Kokia singles chronology
"Follow the Nightingale" (2007)	"Tatta Hitotsu no Omoi" (2008)	"Karma" (2009)

"Tatta Hitotsu no Omoi" (たった1つの想い, Just One Thought) is a song by Kokia, released as her 19th single on January 23, 2008, a month before her sixth studio album The Voice (however the song was not featured on the album). The song was used as the opening theme song for the anime Gunslinger Girl's second series, Gunslinger Girl: Il Teatrino. To date it is her only single released through anime retailer Marvelous Entertainment.

The song was covered by Avex dance group Move on their anime cover album Anim.o.v.e 01 in 2009.

== Composition ==
"Tatta Hitotsu no Omoi" begins with the chorus, solely backed with stringed instrument-sounding synthesizer notes. The bulk of the song is arranged with bass, piano and percussion sound effects.

Kokia felt that the song was created from having the challenge of writing something uptempo (specifically for the anime). She noted it was her first uptempo song she had created in several years. She described the song as "having the feeling of sprinting."

Kokia finished writing the B-side, "Umaretate no Shiro," on 13 December 2007. The song is a celtic-inspired ballad backed with the guitar and a harp. The panpipes also feature in two instrumental sections in the song, as well as during the end. Kokia felt "Umaretate no Shiro" had an atmosphere that suited winter.

== Reception ==
The song debuted at #33 on Oricon's daily singles chart, peaking at #30. For her first week, Kokia's single peaked at #38, selling 3,200 copies. The single spent three weeks in the top 100, and spent an additional nine weeks charting between #100 and #200. By the end of its charting run, the single had sold 10,400 copies. Because of this, "Tatta Hitotsu no Omoi" is Kokia's fifth best selling single, after "The Power of Smile/Remember the Kiss," "Kawaranai Koto (Since 1976)," "Ai no Melody/Chōwa Oto (With Reflection)" and "Follow the Nightingale".

Critically, CDJournal praised the song for its "ephemeral melody that snatches away your heart." They praised the B-side "Umaretate no Shiro" for its "stress clearing harmony," and noted a Norse feel to the song.

== Track listing ==
No.	Title	Writer(s)	Arranger(s)	Length
1.	"Tatta Hitotsu no Omoi (たった1つの想い, Just One Thought)"	Kokia	Kokian's	4:06
2.	"Umaretate no Shiro (生まれたての白, Newborn White)"	Kokia	Yasuhiro Yamamoto	4:20
3.	"Tatta Hitotsu no Omoi (Inst)"	Kokia	Kokian's	4:06
4.	"Umaretate no Shiro (Inst)"	Kokia	Yamamoto	4:18
Total length:				16:50

== Japan Sales Rankings ==
Kokia - "Tatta Hitotsu no Omoi"
A sample from chorus of Kokia's original version.

M.O.V.E - "Tatta Hitotsu no Omoi"
The chorus of M.O.V.E's cover version.

Release	Chart	Peak position	First week sales	Sales total	Chart run
January 23, 2008	Oricon daily singles chart	30			
January 23, 2008	Oricon weekly singles chart	38	3,200	10,400	12 weeks
January 23, 2008	Oricon yearly singles chart				
