= Coquillage: The Best Collection II =

Greatest hits album by Kokia
- Released: December 2, 2009
- Recorded: 2006–2009
- Genre: J-pop, folk
- Length: 1:15:25; 1:25:11 (limited edition)
- Label: Victor Entertainment
- Producer: Kokia

Kokia chronology
| Kokia Infinity Akiko: Balance (2009) | Coquillage: The Best Collection II (2009) | Real World (2010) |

Coquillage: The Best Collection II (stylised as Coquillage～The Best Collection II～) is Kokia's second greatest hits album, released on December 2, 2009.

== Background ==
The album features material from her first album released under Anco&co management, Aigakikoeru: Listen for the Love, in 2006, up to her digital single "Kimi o Sagashite/Last Love Song" (君をさがして／last love song, Searching for You), released in August 2009. It follows her first greatest hits album, Pearl: The Best Collection, by four years.

The album was released after two of Kokia's "Life Trilogy" digital singles, "Kimi o Sagashite/Last Love Song" (君をさがして/last love song, I Search for You) in August 2009, and "Single Mother/Christmas no Hibiki" (single mother/クリスマスの響き, Echo of Christmas) in November 2009. None of the billed A-sides on these singles feature on the album (these were intended for Kokia's 11th studio album, Real World, in 2010), however one of the B-sides made it onto the album, Kokia's cover of Louis Armstrong's "What a Wonderful World" from "Kimi o Sagashite/Last Love Song."

== Conception ==
Kokia selected songs for the album with the concept of songs that can "cleaning your heart." She decided the title would be the French word for shell, coquillage, for several reasons. Firstly, it is a pun on her name ('coquillage' sounding like 'Kokia') Secondly, it is thematically related to her first greatest hits album, Pearl: The Best Collection, since pearls are formed within mollusc shells. Kokia chose the album art to feature Sandro Botticelli's 1486 painting The Birth of Venus due to Venus due to the shell Venus stands on.

"Inori"
Kokia's self-cover of "Inori," originally performed by Ayahi Takagaki.

"Arigatō... (The Coquillage Edition)"
The Coquillage version of "Arigatō..." was performed with only guitar backing.

Kokia chose at least one song from every original album release to feature on the album, along with four rarities/B-sides and two new recordings. "Atatakai Basho" and "Nukumori (Aigakikoeru)" are originally from Aigakikoeru: Listen for the Love (2006), however the strings version was a special version recorded for Kokia's film Ojiisan no Tulip and released on her 2008 digital download EP rarities EP Love Tears. "Ave Maria," "Chiisa na Uta" and "Everlasting" are from The Voice (2008). "Say Goodbye & Good Day," which appeared as the B-side to the lead single from The Voice, "Follow the Nightingale," and as a bonus track on the French version of the album also features on Coquillage. "Song of Pocchong (Shizuku no Uta)" was sourced from Fairy Dance: Kokia Meets Ireland (2008), and "Kokoro no Rōsoku" from Christmas Gift (2008). Two songs each from Kokia's 2009 albums were picked: "Dōke" and "Kono Mune no Kurushimi ga Itooshii Hodo ni Ikite" from Kokia Infinity Akiko: Balance, and the acoustic version of "Infinity" from Akiko Infinity Kokia: Balance, along with "Sekai no Owari ni."

"Candle in the Heart," the English version of "Kokoro no Rōsoku," was originally from Kokia's free release EP given out on the street of New York in 2008. "What a Wonderful World" came from Kokia's digital single "Kimi o Sagashite/Last Love Song" in August 2009.

Of the new recordings, "Inori" is a self-cover of the song "Inori" that Kokia wrote/produced for Ayahi Takagaki comes across Feldt Grace, a character single for Mobile Suit Gundam 00. "Arigatō..." (originally released as a single in 1999 and re-recorded three times previously) is a new acoustic guitar version of the song.

== Promotion ==
In December after the album's release, Kokia held a six date tour in Japan, Jū Ni Gatsu no Okurimono (12月の贈り物, December Present).

== Reception ==
The album charted for two days in Oricon's top 50 daily singles chart, as #27 and #48, before dropping off completely. In the first week, the album reached #73 and sold 2,100 copies, significantly lower than Kokia's original albums released under Anco&co. The album charted for a single more week at #250, selling a total of 2,700 copies.

== Track listing ==
All songs written and produced by Kokia, except for "Ave Maria" (Vladimir Vavilov) and "What a Wonderful World" (Bob Thiele, George David Weiss).

| No. | Title | Arranger(s) | Length |
|---|---|---|---|
| 1. | "Inori (祈り†, Prayer)" | Kiyohide Ura | 4:56 |
| 2. | "Ave Maria" | Taisuke Sawachika | 4:13 |
| 3. | "Atatakai Basho (あたたかい場所, Cosy Place)" | Yasuhisa Yamamoto | 6:31 |
| 4. | "Song of Pocchong (Shizuku no Uta) (ｓｏｎｇ ｏｆ ｐｏｃｃｈｏｎｇ～雫の歌, Song of a Drop of Water)" | Sean Whelan | 3:45 |
| 5. | "Dōke (道化, Antics)" | Ura | 6:00 |
| 6. | "What a Wonderful World" | Ura | 4:37 |
| 7. | "Kono Mune no Kurushimi ga Itooshii Hodo ni Ikite (この胸の苦しみが愛おしいほどに生きて, Living to the Point Where I Love This Pain in My Heart)" | Ura | 4:48 |
| 8. | "Nukumori (Aigakikoeru) (With Strings) (ぬくもり～ａｉｇａｋｉｋｏｅｒｕ～（ｗｉｔｈ ｓｔｒｉｎｇｓ）, Warmth (Listen for the Love))" | Kokia | 5:11 |
| 9. | "Infinity" | Yamamoto | 6:08 |
| 10. | "Say Goodbye & Good Day" | Sawachika | 6:10 |
| 11. | "Chiisa na Uta (小さなうた, A Little Song)" | Sawachika | 6:30 |
| 12. | "Sekai no Owari ni (世界の終わりに, At the End of the World)" | Ura | 5:28 |
| 13. | "Kokoro no Rōsoku (心のロウソク, Candle in the Heart)" | Kokia | 5:33 |
| 14. | "Everlasting" | Sawachika | 5:35 |

Limited edition bonus disc
| No. | Title | Arranger(s) | Length |
|---|---|---|---|
| 1. | "Arigatō... (The Coquillage Edition) (ありがとう…, Thank You...)" | Kokia | 4:24 |
| 2. | "Candle in the Heart" | Kokia | 5:22 |

== Japan Sales Rankings ==
| Release | Chart | Peak position | First week sales | Sales total | Chart run |
|---|---|---|---|---|---|
| December 2, 2009 | Oricon Daily Albums Chart | 27 | | | |
| December 2, 2009 | Oricon Weekly Albums Chart | 73 | 2,100 | 2,700 | 2 weeks |
| December 2, 2009 | Oricon Yearly Albums Chart | | | | |

== Personnel ==
- A&R – Jun Sukegawa
- Design coordination – Mikio Koike, Aki Okiyama
- Designer – Kokia
- Design support – Eri Yaguchi
- Director – Shigeyuki Hirano (Anco&Co.)
- Downloads marketing – Masahito Kuniyoshi
- Arrangers – Kokia (#8, #13, #2-1, #2-2), Taisuke Sawachika (#2, #10-11, #14), Kiyohide Ura (#1, #5-7, #12), Sean Whelan (#4), Yasuhisa Yamamoto (#3, #9)
- Engineers – Katsuhiko "Chara" Asano, Ciaran Byrne, Joseph Chester, Yoshikazu Sasahara, Sean Whelan*Label managers – Toshihiko Fujimi, Satoshi Kamata, Hiroyuki Makimoto,
- Management office – Anco&Co.
- Marketing – Kenji Nozaki
- Mastering – Hiroshi Kawasaki (Flair)
- Musicians – Takeshi Arai, Takashi Furuta, Hiroko Ishida, Harutoshi Ito, Ayako Karasawa, Atsushi Kawahata, Kimura Strings, Kazuhiro Matsuo, Tsuyoshi Miyagawa, Emi Nagoya, Katsuhiko Sato, Kyoichi Sato, Ryosei Sato, Taisuke Sawachika, Shigeki Serizawa, Shin Eai-Sung, Ryoji Takai, Gen Tanabe, Hanako Uesato, Kiyohide Ura, Sean Whelan, Yasuhisa Yamamoto
- Overseas licence – Emiko Kato, Hiroshi Kobayashi, Kazuhiro Yoshida, Sho Yoshimoto
- Producer – Kokia
- Publicist – Shuichi Matsuura
- Songwriters – Kokia (#1, #3-5, #7-14, #2-1, #2-2), Bob Thiele/George David Weiss (#6), Vladimir Vavilov (#2)
- Web promotion – Atsushi Suzuki
