= Music Gift =

EP by Kokia
- Released: 9 December 2008
- Recorded: 2008
- Genre: J-pop, folk
- Length: 16:30
- Label: Anco&co
- Producer: Kokia

Kokia chronology
Love Tears (2008)	Music Gift (2008)	Kokia Infinity Akiko: Balance (2009)

Music Gift is a free release EP released by Kokia, handed out on the streets of New York in on 9 December 2008, limited to 10,000 copies. It was created as a memorial for the 7th anniversary of the September 11 attacks. The original title of the project was the "Remember the Kiss Music Gift" when it was mentioned in Kokia's blog in September 2008. "Candle in the Heart" later featured on a bonus CD on Kokia's 2009 greatest hits album, Coquillage: The Best Collection II. The then First Lady of the United States, Laura Bush, wrote Kokia a letter thanking her for her efforts.

== Recording ==
"Amazing Grace" and "Remember the Kiss (Dedicated to "New" NY)" were released on Kokia's album Christmas Gift in October and November 2008. "Kokoro no Rōsoku" (心のロウソク), the original Japanese version of "Candle in the Heart," also featured. "Amazing Grace" and "Candle in the Heart" were recorded sometime between May and September 2008.

Kokia travelled to New York City for a week in early September 2008 to record "Remember the Kiss (Dedicated to "New" NY)," an English language translation of the song. The song was recorded with a church organ and church choir at the Institutional Church of God Church in Brooklyn.

== Distribution ==
On 9 December, Kokia flew into New York, and on the 9th handed out all 10,000 CDs in a single day at Times Square, dressed in a santa costume.

== Track listing ==
No.	Title	Writer(s)	Arranger(s)	Length
1.	"Remember the Kiss (Dedicated to "New" NY)"	Kokia	Toney Rhodes	6:22
2.	"Candle in the Heart"	Kokia	Kokia	5:22
3.	"Amazing Grace"	John Newton	Kokia	4:46
