= Remember Me (Kokia album) =

Studio album by Kokia
- Released: November 12, 2003 (Japan); November 26, 2003 (Asia)
- Recorded: 2003
- Genre: J-pop, folk
- Length: 1:13:07
- Label: Victor Entertainment
- Producer: Kokia

Kokia chronology
Trip Trip (2002)	Remember Me (2003)	A Piece of Christmas (2003)

Singles from Remember Me
- 1. "Kawaranai Koto (Since 1976)" Released: May 21, 2003; 2. "The Power of Smile/Remember the Kiss" Released: September 24, 2003

Remember Me (stylised as Remember me) is Kokia's third album, released in November 2003. It is currently her most commercially successful release, reaching #15 on the charts due to the success of the singles "Kawaranai Koto (Since 1976)" and "The Power of Smile/Remember the Kiss."

== Background ==
The recording sessions for Remember Me were the first under Victor Entertainment's main management, after releasing her 2002 album Trip Trip with a Victor subsidiary, Gai Records. Two singles were released before the album: "Kawaranai Koto (Since 1976)" in May, and "The Power of Smile/Remember the Kiss," two months before the album in September 2003. However, Kokia's first promoted song associated with the new management was "Tell Tell Bōzu" (tell tell 坊主, Teru Teru Bōzu). The song was used as the second ending theme for the anime Hungry Heart: Wild Striker from the 13th episode onwards, originally airing on Animax in December 2002. It was later released as a B-side of the "Kawaranai Koto" single, and did not make it onto the album.

For Kokia's first single release of 2003, "Kawaranai Koto (Since 1976)" was picked to be used as the daytime TV drama Itoshiki Mono e's theme song, airing everyday from March 31 until June 27. The single was released almost two months into the drama, and became Kokia's first solo single to chart since "Aishiteiru Kara" (愛しているから, Because I Love You) in 1998. Though it only reached #47, the single was a long-seller. It stayed in the top 50 for four weeks, and sold a total of 26,000 copies.

The second single, "The Power of Smile/Remember the Kiss," found more success, and (as of 2010) is Kokia's most successful single. It reached #15, and stayed in the top 30 for five weeks. Though Oricon reports sales of 32,000, the RIAJ certified the single gold (over 100,000 reported copies shipped) in October 2003.

All three A-sides has music videos filmed for them. However, the video for "Remember the Kiss" was not the version present on the single, instead it was the "Duet "Kokia & Piano"" version found on the album.

A track from the album, "Watashi no Taiyō" (私の太陽, My Sky), was also used as an ending theme song for the anime Hungry Heart: Wild Striker. It was used directly after "Tell Tell Bōzu" finished being used (the 40th episode), which first aired in June. Due to this, it was included in Kokia's first greatest hits album, Pearl: The Best Collection, in 2006. However, "Tell Tell Bōzu" was not.

== Reception ==
Professional ratings
Review scores
Source	Rating
CDJournal	(positive)
Hideo Kogure	(positive)

The album was Kokia's first to chart on the Japanese Oricon albums charts, reaching #15 and selling over 45,000 copies. It is currently also Kokia's most sold release, as of 2010.

The album received mostly positive reviews from critics. CDJournal praised the album as being more than just a showcase for Kokia's "beautifully simple" vibrato voice, instead also having songs with positive messages. They also noted Kokia's ability to naturally sing in a broad range of genres (classical, R&B, rock, etc.). Music critic Hideo Kogure praised Kokia's clear vocals, and her outlook on human nature (kindly expressing the beautiful and not so beautiful parts of humanity). He especially noted "Clap Your Hands!," praising the song for its "strange ethnic road" and unique singing techniques.

The leading track, "The Power of Smile," was given a heavily recommended rating by CDJournal (only two of her releases have been rated as such by CDJournal). The site praised the song for its "Nashville" power pop sound, along with its fresh vocals. Music critic Takeshi Ōsuka called the song "high quality" and likened her falsetto voice to Kate Bush, however found her Japanese lyrics mediocre.

== Track listing ==
All tracks are written by Kokia.

No.	Title	Arranger(s)	Length
1.	"Prologue "Remember Me""	Kokia	1:20
2.	"Watashi no Taiyō" (私の太陽 "My Sun")	Taisuke Sawachika	5:19
3.	"Different Way"	Sawachika	4:56
4.	"Kawaranai Koto (Since 1976)"	Sawachika	4:56
5.	"Happy Birthday to Me"	Junichi "Igao" Igarashi	5:59
6.	"With Music"	Sawachika, Kokia	3:53
7.	"Anshin no Naka" (安心の中 "In Relief")	Sawachika	6:11
8.	"Sora" (そら "Sky")	Tomoyuki Asakawa, Kokia	5:42
9.	"The Power of Smile"	Igarashi	4:06
10.	"Clap Your Hands"	Sawachika	5:25
11.	"I Believe (Umi no Soko Kara)" (Ｉ ｂｅｌｉｅｖｅ～海の底から～ "I Believe (From the Bottom of the Sea)")	Sawachika	6:08
12.	"Daiji na Mono wa Mabuta no Ura" (大事なものは目蓋の裏 "Important Things are Behind Your Eyes")	Sawachika	5:09
13.	"?"	Kazuhiro Matsuo	4:19
14.	"Sigh"	Igarashi	5:11
15.	"Remember the Kiss (Duet "Kokia & Piano")"	Kokia	4:33

== Singles ==
"Kawaranai Koto (Since 1976)"
A clip from the first single, "Kawaranai Koto (Since 1976)."

"The Power of Smile"
A clip from the leading track, "The Power of Smile."

"Remember the Kiss"
A clip from the original single version of "Remember the Kiss," not present on the album.

"Remember the Kiss (duet "Kokia & Piano")"
The studio live version of "Remember the Kiss" featured on the album.

Date	Title	Peak position	Weeks	Sales
May 21, 2003	"Kawaranai Koto (Since 1976)"	47 (Oricon)	11	25,721
September 24, 2003	"The Power of Smile/Remember the Kiss"	15 (Oricon)	9	32,359

== Japan Sales Rankings ==
Release	Chart	Peak position	First week sales	Sales total	Chart run
November 12, 2003	Oricon Daily Albums Chart	8			
November 12, 2003	Oricon Weekly Albums Chart	15	16,585	45,195	10 weeks
November 12, 2003	Oricon Yearly Albums Chart				
