= Tales of Innocence =

2007 video game

- Developers: Alfa System (DS); 7th Chord (PSV)
- Publisher: Namco Bandai Games
- Director: Taketoshi Inagaki
- Producers: Ryuji Ōdate; Makoto Yoshizumi (DS); Mika Murakita (PSV)
- Programmer: Masatoshi Fukasawa (DS)
- Artist: Mutsumi Inomata
- Writers: Mami Kajio (DS); Keisuke Shigematsu, Keishi Maeda (PSV)
- Composer: Kazuhiro Nakamura
- Series: Tales
- Platforms: Nintendo DS; PlayStation Vita
- Release: Nintendo DS: JP: December 6, 2007; PlayStation Vita: JP: January 26, 2012
- Genre: Action role-playing game
- Modes: Single-player, multiplayer

Tales of Innocence (Note: Tales of Innocence (Japanese: テイルズオブイノセンス, Hepburn: Teiruzu Obu Inosensu)) is an action role-playing game, developed and released for the Nintendo DS and PlayStation Vita. Innocence is the ninth main installment in the Tales series, developed by Alfa System and published by Bandai Namco Games. It was released in December 2007. A remake for the Vita developed by 7th Chord, Tales of Innocence R (Note: Tales of Innocence R (テイルズオブイノセンス アール, Teiruzu Obu Inosensu Āru)), was released in January 2012. Multiple elements are carried over from previous entries in the series, including the action-based Linear Motion Battle System. Innocence R includes both an updated battle system and additional story content. Both versions remain exclusive to Asia.

Both Innocence and Innocence R focus on Ruca, a merchant's son who encounters a fugitive named Illia. In rescuing her, he discovers he has inherited supernatural powers from his past life. He teams up with Illia and multiple others who have gained similar powers from past lives. The group become involved in the wars consuming the world, along with events pertaining to their past lives and the future of their world.

Innocence began production in 2006 at Alfa System as the next main entry in the Tales series. Developed parallel to Tales of the Tempest, the goal was to include all the series' main gameplay and narrative elements despite the limited medium. The character designs were done by Mutsumi Inomata, while the music was composed by series newcomer Kazuhiro Nakamura. Extensive voice acting was included using CRI Middleware's Kyuseishu Sound Streamer compression algorithm. After release, it was decided to remake Innocence for the Vita, using platform-specific gameplay functions, redone voice work and music, and new characters. Japanese singer-songwriter Kokia created the opening theme songs for both versions of Innocence. Both versions have been positively received in Japan, and Western opinions on the two versions of Innocence have been mostly positive.

== Gameplay ==
Gameplay as seen in Innocence (top) and its Vita remake (bottom). The two versions both share elements and have several differences in graphical quality and gameplay functions.

As with previous entries in the Tales series, Tales of Innocence is an action role-playing game. The player navigates overworld and town environments, and enters a separate arena-like area during battle. The characters and environments are represented using full 3D graphics and models. Characters gain experience levels using experience points, gained by completing quests and fighting. Side-quests separate from the main narrative can be taken through guilds in various parts of the overworld. As the player completes side-quests, guilds level up with the character, providing extra materials and items. Guilds level up as players complete quests for them, and some of the game's dungeons are directly linked to guild quests. Guilds are also used to communicate with other players using the Nintendo DS' wireless function. Multiplayer allows two players to cooperate in battle. During navigation, extra plot-related or casual conversations with characters called Skits can be triggered by the player. Some character interactions used a choice-based "bonding" system, where a dialogue choice is offered while conversing with another character or during certain story scenes: choosing the right response increases the bond with a character, granting both items and special boons in battle.

As with previous games, Innocence uses a retouched version of the "Linear Motion Battle System" (LMBS), a battle system involving direct control of characters similar to a fighting game. The version used is called the "Dimension Stride LMBS". Full range of movement is available, and when enemies are launched into the air by attacks, characters can jump up after them and continue attacking. Three characters are controllable in battle, with one controlled by the player and two handled by the game's artificial intelligence (AI). There are standard attacks, and more powerful moves called Artes. The player can switch between characters instantly. By stringing attacks together into long combos or successfully defending against attacks, characters charge up their tension gauge. When fully charged, the selected character enters an "awakened" state, allowing their attacks to deal more damage. This state can be maintained as long as the player continues to successfully attack and defend without taking hits. If the right buttons are pressed during this period, the character teams up with the other two and unleashes powerful Artes. In addition to these standard and special attacks, each character can activate Mystic Artes, transforming into a form resembling their past selves to deal high amounts of damage. Defeated enemies drop items and currency that the player must collect before they fade or the battle ends. Whereas previous titles had set roles for characters in battle such as healing or ranged attacks, Innocence allows full customization of both the AI-controlled characters' rough roles and their detailed behavior. Materials gathered in exploration and battle can be fused with the weapons. Different fusions can both make the weapon stronger and grant special abilities, such as poisoning the enemy while striking it.

Innocence R uses altered and improved features and elements from the original, including character displays, the "awakened" character state, and the skit, title, grade and cooking systems. The dungeons are rebuilt, featuring new puzzle elements, switches and the need to push boulders to form pathways and unblock passages. An extra dungeon tied into the extra story content is also added. The game uses an altered battle system under the name "Direct Interface LMBS", which includes a fourth playable character. During battle, the characters can be directly commanded using the PlayStation Vita's touch screen. A second Mystic Arte is included for the old characters and two new ones introduced for the two extra characters. After each battle, characters earn Ability Points (AP). AP are used in each character's skill tree by purchasing abilities and stat boosts. Each character has their own unique skill trees. Another additional element is the "Rave Gauge": players can line up different artes in the battle menu, then unleash them all at once on an enemy during battle. An arena is also open to players, where cameo characters from previous Tales titles can be fought.

== Plot ==
The world of Innocence is divided between the "divine" world of Devaloka (divided between the regions of Sensus and Ratio) and the lower human world of Naraka. As Devaloka needed human souls to survive, the Sensus general Asura decided to use the Manifest, an artifact created by the ancient Primordial Giant, to merge Devaloka and Naraka. This plan was opposed by many, leading to war between Sensus and Ratio. Asura was aided by the Devalokans Inanna, Orifiel and Sakuya; his sentient sword Durandal; and his dragon companion Vrtra. Asura eventually won, defeating the Ratio general Hypnos in battle. Before he could use the Manifest, Inanna betrayed and stabbed him with Durandal. He kills her before he dies, leaving the unification of Devaloka and Naraka unfinished. Most of Devaloka's population is killed in the process, with the others eventually dying years later. In the present, Naraka is governed by the imperial capital of Regnum and the western country of Garam, who are in a state of war. Added to this is the emergence of "avatars", Devalokans reincarnated in human form who hold supernatural powers. They are hunted and inducted into Regnum's military and used for experimentation or as front line troops in the war.

The story begins when Ruca Milda, the reincarnation of Asura, encounters another avatar Illia Animi, an avatar of Inanna. She is being chased by agents of Regnum. Ruca decides to protect her, awakening his supernatural powers. The two are eventually captured and forced to become fighters on the front lines along with swordsman Spada Belforma, the reincarnation of Durandal. During their time as prisoners, Ruca develops a relationship with Chitose Cxarma, who is a reincarnation of Sakuya and retains her former self's deep love for Asura. Ruca, Illia and Spada eventually escape, briefly encountering the mercenary Ricardo Soldato, who is a reincarnation of Hypnos. The three are eventually joined by Ricardo, along with Ange Serena and Hermana Larmo, the respective reincarnations of Orifiel and Vrtra.

As they travel across the war-torn land, they are confronted by avatars in the service of multiple nations, and Arca - a cult made up of avatars led by a woman known as Mathias. Chitose joins Arca to further their cause of a utopia for avatars, and tries to persuade Ruca to join, causing a rift between them. The conflicts between the groups is further inflamed as more people regain their memories as warriors of Sensus or Ratio, sparking old conflicts. In their adventures, the group works to end the fighting and learn about their past lives. When the full truth is revealed, they decide to fulfill Asura's wishes and unite the two worlds. This brings them into conflict with Mathias, who is revealed to be the incarnation of Asura's wrath at being betrayed, and now wishes to destroy both Devaloka and Naraka. Chitose, consumed by Sakuya's love for Asura, helps Mathias in her task. The party confront Mathias and Chitose in Devaloka's ruined capital, where the Manifest is hidden. They defeat Mathias, and Chitose kills herself in a fit of despair. Ruca then proceeds to use the Manifest to merge Devaloka and Naraka, nullifying the avatars' powers and lessening the chance of future conflicts. The group then returns to their normal lives.

Innocence R mostly preserves the story of Innocence, while adding two further characters: a spearwoman named QQ Selezneva, and a spellcaster named Kongwai Tao. These two belong to different worlds, and enter the world of Innocence through the so-called "Triverse Gate". Kongwai came to "save" two souls (Chitose and the antagonist Hasta Ekstermi, a reincarnation of the demonic spear Gaebolg), while QQ is an archeologist who comes to investigate the world of Innocence. Each enters and leaves the world while leaving the main events mostly unaltered. While they appear to be on friendly terms, a second playthrough reveals that they are bitter enemies who have been playing a "friendship game" while in the world of Innocence. As they return to their world, they part ways, with QQ swearing to kill Kongwai the next time they meet.

=== Characters ===
- Ruca Milda (ルカ・ミルダ, Ruka Miruda) is a merchant's son living in the capital city of Regnum. A student with high school grades, he is naturally shy and often teased by his classmates. He is the reincarnation of the Devalokan Asura (アスラ), general of the Sensus army.
- Illia Animi (イリア・アニーミ, Iria Anīmi) is an honest and independent village girl who was forced to flee from the Regnum authorities after her powers awaken. She is accompanied by Coda, one of a race called "Myusu" who follows her in order to eat nice food. Illia is the reincarnation of Inanna (イナンナ), a former ally of Asura.
- Spada Belforma (スパーダ・ベルフォルマ, Supāda Beruforuma) is a swordsman from Regnam, a former noble who was rejected by his family. Spada is the reincarnation of Asura's sentient sword and companion Durandal (デュランダル, Durandaru).
- Ricardo Soldato (リカルド・ソルダート, Rikarudo Sorudato) is a marksman and mercenary who is initially forced to fight Ruca, Illia and Spada. Raised in the middle of war, he is a professional type who takes his job seriously. He is the reincarnation of the Ratio general Hypnos (ヒュプノス, Hyupunosu).
- Ange Serena (アンジュ・セレーナ, Anju Serēna) is a priestess who takes in and cares for avatars, using her powers to heal the sick and wounded, earning the nickname of "saint". She acts as an older sister figure to Ruca. She is the reincarnation of Orifiel (オリフィエル, Orifieru), a strategist who defected from Ratio to Sensus.
- Hermana Larmo (エルマーナ・ラルモ, Erumāna Rarumo) is a street urchin who looks after war orphans in Regnum's sewers. Despite her deprived upbringing, she holds a positive outlook on life. She is the reincarnation of Vrtra (ヴリトラ, Vuritora), an ancient dragon who raised Asura.
- QQ Selezneva (キュキュ・セレツネワ, Kyukyu Seretsunewa) and Kongwai Tao (コンウェイ・タウ, Konwei Tau) are two characters introduced in Innocence R. Both traveled from other worlds. While Kongwai is a reserved spellcaster on a secretive mission, QQ is an outgoing, self-proclaimed archeologist fascinated by the technology of Innocence's world.

== Development ==
Planning and early development of Innocence began between March and April 2006, with full development beginning in late 2006 to early 2007. Total development time came to roughly a year and a half. It was being developed at the same time as Tales of the Tempest, another Tales title for the DS, as the next main entry in the Tales series. While Tempest was conceived as a "compact" version of a Tales title, Innocence was designed to include all the elements expected from a mainline console title, meaning it was created with very different development goals. Rather than by established Tales developer Namco Tales Studio, Innocence was developed by Alfa System, a Japanese studio that had previously worked on the first two Tales of the World spin-off titles. They were chosen to work on the game because of their previous successful efforts with these spin-offs. It was the company's first title for the DS. While developing the title, the team drew on previous difficulties suffered while developing Tempest to promote a smoother development and better final product. The team tweaked the battle system used for the title so that it felt fresh to series veterans while still retaining its identity. One of these aspects was the new character growth system, which relied on customization more than gaining levels in a linear fashion through experience; the theme behind the creation of this system was "a more profound battle with wider frontage". The team incorporated an updated version of the free-running ability from Tales of the Abyss so players could have maximum freedom in battle.

The game's title was inspired by Ruca's portrayal as an innocent young boy thrust into the world's troubles. Ruca himself was portrayed as a shy and introverted type, unlike many previous Tales protagonists, which were portrayed as outgoing and confident. As well as themes of coexistence common in the Tales series, the team incorporated aesthetics and motifs from the late 19th and early 20th centuries. The characters were designed by regular Tales artist Mutsumi Inomata, who almost turned down the offer to work on the title due to scheduling conflicts. She created the cast of Innocence at the same time as that of Tales of Hearts, leading to difficulties with her workload. Inomata's brief was not to emphasise the characters' status as heroes, with Luca being deliberately drawn and designed as a physically weak character. As with previous games, Innocence was given a characteristic genre name. The name for Innocence was Omoi o tsunagu RPG (想いを繋ぐRPG, RPG To Tie Thoughts Together). This name was carried over into Innocence R. The game's opening was animated by long-time collaborator Production I.G. Innocence was first announced at a special event in July 2007, alongside ports of Tales of Rebirth and Tales of Destiny as well as Tales of Symphonia: Dawn of the New World for the Wii. Innocence did not receive a localization, remaining a Japan-exclusive title. Despite this, a fan translation group working under the name "Absolute Zero" created a patch for the game that both translated the text, and fixed bugs and glitches.

=== Innocence R ===
At a much later date, members of the team decided to remake Innocence, as fan feedback had pointed out many features they had wanted to include despite putting all that was possible into Innocence. Controlling the characters using the PlayStation Vita's touch screen was included for ease of play, although gameplay features using the Vita's other functions was considered during development. Innocence R was developed by Japanese developer 7th Chord. Innocence R was a ground-up remake, with the "R" in the title standing for "re-imagination", referring to the team's development wish for the gameplay and story. Everything from the coding to the animation was redone. The team hoped that the game would provide a boost to the sales of its prospective platform. Inomata returned in her role as character designer for the new characters, while Mika Murakita joined Odate as a producer. New opening and in-game anime cutscenes were created by Production I.G. Development overlapped with the Vita remake of Hearts, with staff from Innocence R also working on Hearts R.

The existence of Innocence R was first revealed through information from a leaked issue of V Jump about the Tales games that were scheduled to appear at the 2011 Tokyo Game Show. The game's teaser site was officially unveiled shortly after this. The first details and gameplay footage were shown to the public during the show alongside Tales of the Heroes: Twin Brave. Innocence R was heavily promoted by the company, with one campaign involving playing out an animated skit using the outdoor monitors around Shibuya Station. As with the original, Innocence R has not received a localization, making it one of eleven mainline Tales titles not to be released in the west. The decision not to localize it was influenced by poor marketing feedback from western territories. Later, during an interview involving Hearts R and Tales of Xillia 2, series producer Hideo Baba stated that while the game was never intended for localization, if Hearts R sold well, a localization could be considered.

== Audio ==
Voice acting in Tempest was restricted to battles. Dissatisfied with this approach, the developers wanted to have full voice acting for Innocence while keeping as many planned features in the game as possible. After some trial and error, and on the verge of scrapping voice acting altogether, the team used CRI Middleware's Kyuseishu Sound Streamer compression algorithm to fit the voice acting into the game alongside the other features. The team first learned of the algorithm in May 2006, when the first prototype of Innocence had already been built. The inclusion of the algorithm forced the team to scrap elements of the first build and restart development. The new prototype was completed in November 2006. The predicted amount of voice recording was estimated at 120 minutes. The final product included 40 minutes more than that. According to Ōdate, approximately 70-80% percent of the main scenario was voiced, with the rest of the game's dialogue using text due to hardware limitations. The voice work took up one gigabit of storage space on the DS card. For Innocence R, the voice acting was re-recorded, with the entire main scenario being voiced. This enabled minor changes to character portrayals, as in the case of Kimura when she was redoing Luca's lines: according to her, she worked to inject a little more energy into Luca's voice. For the two new characters, the team created a fictional language called the "Triverse Language", which the characters' actors sometimes had trouble speaking.

=== Music ===
The music for Innocence was composed by Kazuhiro Nakamura, who had previously worked on the Time Crisis and Tekken series. The tracks were arranged with the help of Taisuke Sawachika. For his work on the game, Nakamura chose a different style of music from that of Motoi Sakuraba, who had handled the majority of previous Tales titles: he used ethnic music to distinguish it from earlier games. For the battle music, he used Sakuraba's battle compositions as a reference while keeping to his own style. The remixed and additional music for Innocence R was again handled and composed by Nakamura.

The theme song for Innocence, "Follow the Nightingale", was created and sung by Japanese singer-songwriter Kokia. She was asked on board by the game's staff as they were favorably impressed by her voice. While composing the song, she was allowed to draw inspiration from storyboards and early footage. The theme and lyrics of "Follow the Nightingale" tie in with the characters' status as people reincarnated in the game's present, focusing on the main protagonist Luca asking why they were reborn. As with some of her earlier songs, she wrote some parts of it in code, with Kokia herself describing them as "perplexing riddle words". For Innocence R, Kokia was brought in again and asked to create a different opening number, "New Day, New Life". For this song, Kokia drew from the opening sequence, where Luca wakes from dreaming of his past life and opens the window. Unlike "Follow the Nightingale", "New Day, New Life" was written entirely in standard Japanese, as she wanted to fully convey Luca's feelings in the song, along with those of Kongwai.

The official soundtrack album, Tales of Innocence Original Soundtrack Another Innocence (テイルズ オブ イノセンス オリジナルサウンドトラック アナザーイノセンス), was released on December 19, 2007. It did not enter the Oricon charts. Reviews of the soundtrack have been mixed to positive. Bryan Matheny, in a review published by Game-OST, said that while the music would satisfy Tales fans, it felt Nakamura had missed the chance of doing something different in the vein of Tales of Legendia. RPGFan's Patrick Gann called the album "solid", and noted several tracks that stood out including the battle and overworld themes. Despite this, he felt that it was "forgettable" compared to other Tales soundtracks. "Follow the Nightingale" was released on November 21, 2007, as a single alongside Innocence's ending song "say goodbye & good day". It reached #33 in the Oricon charts, and remained in the charts for nine weeks. "New Day, New Life" was released on January 25, 2012. It reached #29 in the charts, and remained for four weeks.

== Reception ==
Reception

Review scores
Publication	Score
Famitsu	35/40 (DS); 36/40 (Vita)
RPGFan	73% (Vita)

Prior to release, Innocence was reporting to be one of the most pre-ordered role-playing titles at Amazon Japan alongside Xbox 360 exclusive Lost Odyssey. The game received an initial shipment of 160,000 copies, with projected sales estimated at 150,000. Innocence reached #3 in the Japanese sales charts after Wii Fit and Mario Party DS, with estimated opening sales of 104,000 copies. After the first week, sales dropped dramatically, selling only 28,000 units the following week. Ultimately, Innocence was considered a success by the company, selling approximately 246,000 copies and exceeding their sales forecasts for the title. Innocence R reached #3 in the Japanese sales charts in its opening week, coming behind Armored Core V and Resident Evil: Revelations and selling 54,853 copies. By July of that year, Innocence R was the sixth best-selling title for the Vita, with total sales of 74,718 copies.

Famitsu praised Innocence's high-polygon character models, and the story and characters, which were generally engaging and entertaining. Gameplay was also praised, with the increased freedom of movement in battle being positively noted, along with the breadth of character customization available. Some minor points came in for criticism, such as parts of the game that would be difficult for newcomers, and a lack of explanation for some parts of the story. The score given by the magazine was noted as being the highest given by Famitsu to a Tales game up to that point. Paul Koehler of RPGamer, writing up his impression of the game at TGS 2007, was favorably impressed, calling map navigation "fluid" and saying that the graphics were "one of the better offerings at the show on the DS." Cubed3's Adam Riley was generally positive during his hands-on preview. He called the game's quality acting "amazingly high", praised the amount of voice acting, and saw it as "one of the better-rounded titles in the franchise so far." Comparing the game to Tempest, he said that Innocence made the previous DS game "look amateur in nature." RPGFan's Neal Chandran shared many points of praise with Riley, saying that the game promised to be "both a high quality RPG for Nintendo's DS and a high quality entry to this prolific RPG series."

Innocence R was also well received by Famitsu. General praise to the graphical upgrade over the original version, the rebuilt battle system and added voice acting and story content. Japanese website Game Watch was highly positive, praising the extra characters, updated gameplay and graphics. One minor reservation was that some aspects might be a little difficult or complex for players. The reviewer's closing comment was that it was a role-playing game they would "recommend to anyone". Abraham Ashton Liu of RPGFan was fairly mixed about some aspects of it. While he found aspects of comparing the characters' past and present lives and enjoyed the gameplay and side-characters, he generally found the lead characters irritating. He also found the graphics rather poor for the Vita and saw some gameplay elements as archaic or poorly tuned. In March 2013, Famitsu ranked the top games of 2012, and Innocence R reached 13th place. In July 2014, Innocence R was ranked by Japanese website Inside Games among the top ten popular role-playing games for the Vita.

== Additional media ==
Multiple pieces of media have been created either to promote or complement the game before and after release. To promote the original title's release, the company created an "Adventure Voice DVD", featuring multiple characters from previous Tales games. Multiple books were created after the game's release, including three guidebooks, a two-part novel adaptation released between January and March 2008, and a three-part weekly series of instruction guidebooks released between November 30 and December 30, 2007. The guidebooks contain gameplay hints, concept art and staff interviews. The game was also adapted into a two-part audio drama. Titled Tales of Innocence Drama CD (テイルズオブイノセンス ドラマＣＤ, Teiruzu Obu Inosensu Dorama CD), the two volumes were released on June 25 and July 25, 2008.

Shortly after the release of Innocence R, Bandai Namco developed and released a free smartphone app and released it through iTunes on January 27, 2012. The app allowed users to play selected songs from Innocence R, as well as view concept art and character profiles. A rhythm game was also included for the tunes, allowing players to post their scores on Twitter. Innocene R was adapted into a manga. It was collected into a single volume and released on May 25, 2012, as Tales of Innocence R Comic Anthology (テイルズオブイノセンス R コミックアンソロジー, Teiruzu Obu Inosensu R Komikku Ansorojī).
