= Ai no Melody / Chōwa Oto (With Reflection) =

"Ai no Melody/Chōwa Oto (With Reflection)"

Single by Kokia

from the album Pearl: The Best Collection
- Released: January 1, 2006
- Genre: J-pop, Neoclassical (dark wave)
- Length: 5:42; 4:38
- Label: Victor Entertainment
- Songwriter: Kokia
- Producer: Kokia

Kokia singles chronology
"Time to Say Goodbye" (2005)	"Ai no Melody/Chōwa Oto (With Reflection)" (2006)	"Arigatō... (The Pearl Edition)" (2006)

"Ai no Melody/Chōwa Oto (With Reflection)" (愛のメロディー / 調和oto 〜with reflection〜, Melody of Love/Harmony, Sound (With Reflection)) is Kokia's 15th single, released on January 1, 2006, a month before her greatest hits collection Pearl: The Best Collection. The songs were used as the ending and opening theme songs for the animated film Origin: Spirits of the Past. "Chōwa Oto (With Reflection)" is a re-recording of her song "Chōwa Oto" from her Gai Records' management era album Trip Trip (2002).

== Composition ==
=== Ai no Melody ===
The song is a piano-backed ballad. The song begins piano-backed, and leads into a chorus backed with percussion, guitar, piano and strings. The majority of the verses have a minimal arrangement, mostly only piano with occasional strings and other sound effects.

The soundtrack version has the same arrangement as the original, however has embellished background music in part (such as added harp) and extended instrumental sections.

The lyrics express the love for another, likening them to "sunbeams filtering through leaves", and saying that they had given the song's protagonist hope. The person feels that "Because I have you, I'm able to be like myself." Therefore, she sings a song born of the love they have for that person.

=== Chōwa Oto ===
The song is sung in a 12 note scale. The song begins with a 1:50 introduction in three steps: first Kokia sings Japanese lyrics against background sound effects and the piano. This leads into a section with added percussion where Kokia counts numbers in English. The final part of the introduction features Kokia harmonising with herself without lyrics.

This leads into the chorus, sung in coded Japanese. The chorus' arrangement is backed with a more complex variety of instruments. This leads into a more pop-inspired bridge, backed with added sound effects. This then leads into the chorus twice more, and finally one single abridged chorus backed only with piano.

There are three sections to the song's lyrics: standard Japanese, numbers and coded Japanese. The numbers are a code that represents the letters of the Latin alphabet (1=A, 26=Z). When decoded, the numbers (3 25 15 21 23 and 1) wrote the song's name in wāpuro rōmaji (C Y O U W A). The coded Japanese section features reversed syllables (such as the lyric "nimiunooto denzush", when reversed gives "Oto no umi ni shizunde" (音の海に 沈んで, sinking in a sea of sound)). Both the standard Japanese and coded section have lyrics which bring up many natural images (such as a "sea of sound", "drop of water", "quiet forest", etc.).

The re-arranged version on the single is not much different from the original in terms of structure. In terms of arrangement, the original features more synthesisers, less instruments and no piano.

== Music video ==
Kokia in the music video for "Ai no Melody"

A music video was filmed for the leading A-side, "Ai no Melody", directed by Takatoshi Tsuchiya (土屋隆俊). It was the last music video she created, until filming "The Woman" from Real World in 2010, four years later. It was shot near the beginning of December in the outskirts of Tokyo. A vote was taken on Kokia's official site as to which actress out of five potentials should be shot as the main character in the video, with Sachi Natsuo winning. The video was broadcast by streaming on Kokia's site from the 18th of November, 2005.

The video is centred on two main views. One is centred on Kokia, singing in front of a tree, set inside against a beige backing. The second is a mini-drama performed by actor Ryō Katsuji (the voice of Agito in Origin: Spirits of the Past) and actress Sachi Natsuo. The beginning of the video features Natsuo sitting down to watch a film, with nobody else in the cinema. An earlier scene of her is shown as she packs away belongings of her deceased boyfriend. Underneath a manga on the floor, she finds a copy of Kokia's "Ai no Melody" single.

The Kokia tree scene and the drama scenes now begin to merge: Katsuji's character, dressed in white, appears near the tree. Natsuo's character then visits a tree in a park where she and her former boyfriend used to spend time. Both characters touch their respective trees. Katsuji's tree begins to grow, and a leaf falls on Natsuo as she watches the film in the cinema.

The final scene (after the song has stopped playing) features Natuo's character walking past Kokia as she leaves the cinema.

== Promotion ==
Much promotion was centred on the music video, including the contest for the lead actress and the video being able to be streamed from Kokia's website. A special making of report was streamed on Yahoo!'s Japan streaming video site on November the 25th. A feature in the November 29 edition of Sports Hochi also centred on the music video. Kokia appeared in various magazines in December, mainly anime-based publications. These included Anican, Animage, Castvoice, JSBN, Newsmaker and fashion magazine Seventeen. Kokia appeared on two TV shows in late December, Bomber E and Power Jam.

== Reception ==
The song debuted at No. 33 in its first week, however ranked in higher at No. 30 in its second. This was despite her second week's sales being less than half of her first week's (2,300 copies as opposed to 6,500). The song spent two more weeks in the top 100, and a single extra week in the top 200, eventually selling 12,700 copies in this time. Because of this, "Ai no Melody/Chōwa Oto (With Reflection)" is Kokia's third best selling single, after "The Power of Smile/Remember the Kiss" and "Kawaranai Koto (Since 1976)" in 2003.

Critically, CDJournal gave the single a star of recommendation (an award reserved for CDJournal reviewers' favourite musical releases).

== Track listing ==
No.	Title	Writer(s)	Arranger(s)	Length
1.	"Ai no Melody (愛のメロディー, Melody of Love)"	Kokia	Taisuke Sawachika	5:42
2.	"Chōwa Oto (With Reflection) (調和oto 〜with reflection〜, Melody of Love/Harmony, Sound (With Reflection))"	Kokia	Takeshi Senoh	4:38
3.	"Ai no Melody (Soundtrack Ver.)"	Kokia	Sawachika	7:06
4.	"Ai no Melody (Instrumental)"	Kokia	Sawachika	5:41
Total length:				23:07

== Japan sales rankings ==
Release	Chart	Peak position	First week sales	Total sales	Chart run
January 1, 2006	Oricon daily singles chart				
January 1, 2006	Oricon weekly singles chart	38	6,500	12,700	6 weeks
January 1, 2006	Oricon yearly singles chart				

== Personnel ==
- Katsuhiko "Chara" Asano – engineering at Little Bach Harajuku, Crescent Studio, Sound Inn
- Kei Haneoka – strings arrangement, programming (#2)
- Masato Ishinari – guitars (#2)
- Yoshiaki Kanoh – guitars (#1, #3–4)
- Hiroshi Kawasaki – mastering
- Kokia – songwriter, vocalist
- Hijiri Kuwana Group – strings (#2)
- Taisuke Sawachika – arranger, keyboards, programming (#1, #3–4)
- Takeshi Senoh – arranger, piano (#2)
