= Aigakikoeru: Listen for the Love =

Studio album by Kokia
- Released: November 29, 2006 (France); May 23, 2007 (Japan)
- Recorded: 2006
- Genre: J-pop, folk
- Length: 1:11:01 (French Edition); 1:17:04 (Japanese Edition)
- Label: Wasabi Records, Victor Entertainment
- Producer: Kokia

Kokia chronology
Birthday Present (2006)	Aigakikoeru: Listen for the Love (2006)	The Voice (2008)

Aigakikoeru: Listen for the Love is Japanese singer Kokia's fifth album. It was originally released under Wasabi Records in France in November 2006, however was eventually released in Japan six months later. "Aigakikoeru" (standard Japanese "Ai ga Kikoeru" (愛が聴こえる)) means "Love Can Be Heard."

Two songs from the album feature on Kokia's 2009 greatest hits collection Coquillage: The Best Collection II: "Atatakai Basho" and a previously unpublished version of "Nukumori (Aigakikoeru)" featuring stringed instruments.

== Background ==
This album is Kokia's first to be managed by her own company, Anco & Co., after desiring greater creative autonomy from Victor Entertainment. However, when the album was released in Japan, it was still distributed under Victor.

In July 2006, Kokia created 47 Stories, which was a concept theme for her musical activities. The project intended to "deliver songs to the 47 Prefectures of Japan," as opposed to just the central metropolitan areas where concerts are generally held. A new song of hers, "Inori ni mo Nita Utsukushii Sekai," was made the theme song for the intended concerts. This would eventually make its way onto the album. Kokia, however, did not manage to reach all 47 wards of Japan. At the second date of her Kokia 2006 Keep Moving tour, Kokia gave out 100 Birthday Present EPs for the earliest people at the venue in celebration of her 30th birthday. The CD featured "Inori ni mo Nita Utsukushii Sekai" and another song that would be put onto the album, "Itsuka Dareka o Ai Shita Toki." Many of the songs performed at 47 Stories concerts made it onto the album, such as "Ahiru no Kokoro," "Atatakai Basho," "Inochi no Hikari," "Kakusei (Open Your Eyes)" and "So Sad So Bad."

== Recording ==
Kokia started forming Aigakikoeru in late August 2006, and finished recording in October. Kokia gave the album a theme of warmth, with Kokia using many of her songs that had kind and tender lyrics.

Many of the songs were stock songs written by Kokia at earlier points. "Uchū ga..." was originally performed in concerts in late 2002, however, rearranged for the album release. "Cocoro" was the opening number from her second solo concert, Your Side: Motto Soba ni, in 2003. "Futari no Musume" was also originally performed in 2003. "Yasashiku Sareru to Yasashiku Nareru Hana" was written as one of the possibilities for the ending theme of the film Origin: Spirits of the Past.

Kokia took her inspiration from many places. "Inori ni mo Nita Utsukushii Sekai" was written in the vein of hymns she heard at church when she was young. "Nukumori (Listen for the Love)" was written for her grandfather, when Kokia was spending time nursing him at his bedside in hospital, before his death. "Ahiru no Kokoro" is based on the fairy tale The Ugly Duckling by Hans Christian Andersen.

== Release ==
"Kokia Collection" cover, featuring Aigakikoeru.

The album was originally released in November 2006 in France, through Wasabi Records (primarily a distributor for anime-related music and DVDs). Kokia had previously performed a successful concert in Paris in early 2006. The French edition was released with an English booklet, as well as a bonus track: "Remember the Kiss (World Edition)." This version was a piano-backed English lyrics version of the song.

The eventual Japanese release, six months later, also featured bonus tracks: "Inochi no Hikari" and "Arigatō... (from Kokia 2007)." "Inochi no Hikari" was an original song Kokia has performed at concerts in 2006, while the other track is a re-recording of Kokia's Pony Canyon-era single.

The album was re-released in France as a part of a 3-CD set called Kokia Collection, on 22 October 2008. The album also featured 2008's The Voice and Christmas Gift, and features a cover similar to the Christmas Gift photoshoot cover.

== Reception ==
The album reached #67 on the Japanese Oricon albums charts, selling 6,000 copies. The album was not reviewed heavily by critics. However, one of the few reviews (by CDJournal) praised the album for its "mystery world of deeply emotional lyrics" and Kokia's vocals.

== Track listing ==
All songs written and produced by Kokia. Translations given are official English titles listed in French edition (except for track #6, tracks #14, #15 (Japanese Ed.)).

No.	Title	Arranger(s)	Length
1.	"Itsuka Dareka o Ai Shita Toki (Anthem Ver.) (いつか誰かを愛した時, Someday When You Love Someone)"	Kokia	5:49
2.	"Uchū ga... (宇宙が..., A Universe Is...)"	Taisuke Sawachika	4:51
3.	"Ahiru no Kokoro (アヒルのココロ, Hope of an Ugly Ducklin')"	Kokia	5:57
4.	"Futari no Musume (二人の娘, The Story of Two Daughters)"	Yasuhisa Yamamoto	5:32
5.	"Kakusei (Open Your Eyes) (覚醒～ｏｐｅｎ ｙｏｕｒ ｅｙｅｓ～, Awakening (Open Your Eyes))"	Sawachika	4:47
6.	"Cocoro (Heart)"	Yamamoto	5:01
7.	"Humanitarian"	Kokia	3:56
8.	"So Sad So Bad"	Yamamoto	5:04
9.	"Yasashiku Sareru to Yasashiku Nareru Hana (やさしくされるとやさしくなれる花, A Flower Blooming Under Tenderness)"	Sawachika	5:32
10.	"Nukumori (Aigakikoeru) (ぬくもり～ａｉｇａｋｉｋｏｅｒｕ～, Warmth (Listen for the Love))"	Kokia	5:09
11.	"Why Do I Sing?"	Toshiya Shioiri	3:37
12.	"Atatakai Basho (あたたかい場所, Cosy Place)"	Yamamoto	6:28

French Edition
No.	Title	Arranger(s)	Length
13.	"Remember the Kiss (World Edition)"	Shioiri	4:35
14.	"Inori ni mo Nita Utsukushii Sekai (祈りにも似た美しい世界, Music, Like a Prayer)"	Kokia	4:07
Total length:			1:11:01

Japanese Edition
No.	Title	Arranger(s)	Length
13.	"Inori ni mo Nita Utsukushii Sekai (祈りにも似た美しい世界, Music, Like a Prayer)"	Kokia	4:07
14.	"Inochi no Hikari (命の光, Light of Life)"	Kokia	5:08
15.	"Arigatō... (from Kokia 2007) (ありがとう... （ｆｒｏｍ ＫＯＫＩＡ ２００７）, Thank You...)"	Kokia	5:30
Total length:			1:17:04

== Japan Sales Rankings ==
"Nukumori (Aigakikoeru)"
The title track for the album, "Nukumori" features an acoustic "warm" sound.

"So Sad So Bad"
The "warmth" theme and lyrics are also expressed in the album's upbeat songs, such as "So Sad So Bad."

Release	Chart	Peak position	First week sales	Sales total	Chart run
May 23, 2007	Oricon Daily Albums Chart				
May 23, 2007	Oricon Weekly Albums Chart	67	2,878	5,749	4 weeks
May 23, 2007	Oricon Yearly Albums Chart				

== Personnel ==
Track numbers relate to the French edition of the album.

- Katsuhiko "Chara" Asano – mixing engineer
- Eco – piano (#6)
- Takako Fujieda – harp (#2)
- Masayoshi Furukawa – acoustic guitar (#6), classical guitar (#4)
- Nobuo Furukawa – cello (#11)
- Yoei Hashimono – mastering (at Aubrite Mastering Studio)
- Tetsuya Hayakawa – fretless bass (#6), washtub bass (#4)
- Shigeyuki Hirano – director
- Masami Horisawa – cello (#5, #9)
- Noriko Inose – photographer
- Atsushi Kawahata – keyboards/piano (#8, #12)
- Crusher Kimura – violin (#5, #9)
- Kokia – arranger (#1, #3, #7, #14), art work design, producer, programming (#7), songwriter, "ugly ducklin'" sound (#3), vocal chorus arrangement, vocals, violin (#7)
- Maiko – violin (#5)
- Hiroshi Matsubara – percussion (#2–3)
- Kazuhiro Matsuo – acoustic guitar (#2–3, #5, #10, #12, #14), electric guitar (#7), classical guitar (#9)
- Shoko Miki – viola (#5)
- Kyoko Ohsako – keyboard (#3)
- Hiroyasu Okada – siku/quena (#4)
- Haruhiko Saga – morin khuur (#4)
- Toshiya Shioiri – arrangement/piano (#11, #13)
- Taisuke Sawachika – arranger/programming (#2, #5, #9), piano (#2, #5)
- Ataru Sumiyoshi – electric bass (#3, #7–8, #12)
- Gen Tanabe – additional arrangement (#6, #8, #12), acoustic guitar (#6, #12), electric guitar (#6, #8, #12), noise design (#6), ukulele (#4)
- Yasuhisa Yamamoto (Usatrene Records) – arranger (#4, #6, #8, #12), keyboard (#6, #8), percussion (#4, #6, #12), programming (#6, #8, #12), strings arrangement (#4)
