= Christmas Gift (album) =

- French edition slipcase cover

Studio album by Kokia
- Released: October 22, 2008 (France); November 12, 2008 (Japan)
- Recorded: 2008
- Genre: J-pop, folk, Christmas carol
- Length: 1:01:52 (Japanese edition); 1:03:07 (French edition)
- Label: Victor Entertainment, Wasabi Records
- Producer: Kokia

Kokia chronology
Fairy Dance: Kokia Meets Ireland (2008)	Christmas Gift (2008)	Love Tears (2008)

Christmas Gift is Kokia's eighth studio album, released in October/November 2008. It is her first full-length Christmas album, though she had released a special Christmas EP for fans, A Piece of Christmas, in November 2006. It is the final of four albums released in 2008 to celebrate her 10th anniversary as a singer.

One song from the album, "Kokoro no Rōsoku," features on Kokia's 2009 greatest hits collection Coquillage: The Best Collection II.

== Recording ==
Kokia began recording the album in May 2008, though refused to mention what the sessions were for. In September, the album was still gradually being recorded, with Kokia working with producer Kiyohide Ura for several tracks. The album was confirmed in Kokia's blog on September the 1st, though recording was still continuing at this point.

Kokia also travelled to New York City for a week to record for her "Remember the Kiss Music Gift" project in early September. These sessions were for Kokia's special Music Gift EP, which featured Christmas recordings. One of the songs from these sessions, "Remember the Kiss (Dedicated to "New" NY)," was released as a bonus track on the Japanese edition. It was recorded on the organ with a church choir at the Institutional Church of God Church in Brooklyn.

== Song selection ==
Of the songs included in the album, 12 are covers and three are original Kokia songs (if counting medley songs and bonus tracks).

Of the covers, five are religious Christmas carols: "Amazing Grace," "It Came Upon the Midnight Clear," "The Little Drummer Boy," "The First Noël" and "We Three Kings of Orient Are". Four of the songs are secular Christmas songs: "I'll Be Home for Christmas," "Jingle Bells," "Let It Snow! Let It Snow! Let It Snow!" and "Santa Claus Is Comin' to Town." Three of these four secular songs are a part of the Christmas medley.

Two songs are covers of songs not directly related to Christmas by popular Western musicians. The first is Leonard Cohen's "Hallelujah," and the second is Queen's Japanese song, "Teo Torriatte (Let Us Cling Together)."

"Ave Maria" is a cover of the Johann Sebastian Bach classical piece of music with lyrics from Hail Mary prayer in Latin. Earlier the same year Kokia recorded Vavilov's "Ave Maria" on her "The Voice" album.

== Release ==
Much like Kokia's first album released on Wasabi Records, Aigakikoeru: Listen for the Love, it was released in France prior to the Japanese release. The French edition was released on October 22, three weeks before the Japanese release.

Christmas Gift was also simultaneously released in France as a part of a 3CD set called Kokia Collection. The album also featured 2006's Aigakikoeru: Listen for the Love 2008's and The Voice, and featured a cover similar to the Christmas Gift photoshoot cover.

== Reception ==
The album reached #56 on the Japanese Oricon albums charts, selling 3,000 copies. CDJournal called the album a "Christmas song selection you can enjoy with your family."

== Track listing ==
The French and Japanese versions were released with different track orders. The Japanese version also had a bonus track, "Remember the Kiss (Dedicated to "New" NY)."

French track list
No.	Title	Writer(s)	Arranger(s)	Length
1.	"Amazing Grace"	John Newton	Kokia	4:46
2.	"Ave Maria"	Bach	Ryosuke Nakanishi	3:00
3.	"I'll Be Home for Christmas"	Buck Ram, Kim Gannon, Walter Kent	Nakanishi	4:15
4.	"Christmas Medley: Santa Claus Is Comin' to Town, Let It Snow! Let It Snow! Let It Snow!, The Little Drummer Boy, The First Noël, Jingle Bells"	J. Fred Coots, Haven Gillespie, Sammy Cahn, Jule Styne, Katherine K. Davis, Traditional, James Lord Pierpont	Sunny	13:19
5.	"Hallelujah"	Leonard Cohen	Kiyohide Ura	4:41
6.	"Sei Naru Yoru ni (Holy Night) (聖なる夜に～ｈｏｌｙ ｎｉｇｈｔ, In the Holy Night)"	Kokia	Ura	4:34
7.	"Kokoro no Rōsoku (心のロウソク, Candle in the Heart)"	Kokia	Kokia	5:33
8.	"We Three Kings of Orient Are"	John Henry Hopkins Jr.	Yasuhisa Yamamoto	4:36
9.	"It Came Upon the Midnight Clear"	Edmund Sears	Yamamoto	5:09
10.	"Teo Torriatte (Let Us Cling Together)"	Brian May	Sunny	4:33

Japanese track list
No.	Title	Writer(s)	Arranger(s)	Length
1.	"Amazing Grace"	Newton	Kokia	4:46
2.	"Hallelujah"	Cohen	Ura	4:41
3.	"I'll Be Home for Christmas"	Ram, Gannon, Kent	Nakanishi	4:15
4.	"We Three Kings of Orient Are"	Hopkins	Yamamoto	4:36
5.	"Christmas Medley: Santa Claus Is Comin' to Town, Let It Snow! Let It Snow! Let It Snow!, The Little Drummer Boy, The First Noël, Jingle Bells"	Coots, Gillespie, Cahn, Styne, Davis, Traditional, Pierpont	Various	13:19
6.	"Teo Torriatte (Let Us Cling Together)"	May	Sunny	4:33
7.	"Ave Maria"	Bach	Nakanishi	3:00
8.	"It Came Upon the Midnight Clear"	Sears	Yamamoto	5:09
9.	"Sei Naru Yoru ni (Holy Night) (聖なる夜に～ｈｏｌｙ ｎｉｇｈｔ, In the Holy Night)"	Kokia	Ura	4:34
10.	"Kokoro no Rōsoku (心のロウソク, Candle in the Heart)"	Kokia	Kokia	5:33
11.	"Remember the Kiss (Dedicated to "New" NY)"	Kokia	Toney Rhodes	6:22

== Japan sales rankings ==
"Hallelujah"
A sample of Kokia's cover of the contemporary standard "Hallelujah."

"We Three Kings of Orient Are"
A sample of Kokia's cover of the traditional Christmas song "We Three Kings."

Release	Chart	Peak position	First week sales	Sales total
February 20, 2008	Oricon Weekly Albums Chart	56	2,297	3,020
