= Kokia Infinity Akiko: Balance =

Studio album by Kokia
- Released: March 18, 2009 (Japan); May 26, 2009 (North America); May 20, 2009 (Europe)
- Recorded: 2008–2009
- Genre: J-pop, neoclassical (dark wave), folk
- Length: 1:00:01
- Label: Victor Entertainment, Wasabi Records
- Producer: Kokia

Kokia chronology
| Music Gift (2008) | Kokia Infinity Akiko: Balance (2009) | Coquillage: The Best Collection II (2009) |

Additional covers
- 2CD set cover

Kokia Infinity Akiko: Balance (stylised as KOKIA∞AKIKO ～balance～) is Kokia's ninth equal studio album, released simultaneously with Akiko Infinity Kokia: Balance in March 2009.

Two songs from the album feature on Kokia's greatest hits collection Coquillage: The Best Collection II: "Dōke" and "Kono Mune no Kurushimi ga Itooshii Hodo ni Ikite."

To promote the albums, Kokia embarked on her first world tour, Infinity. The tour, beginning in April in Japan, went for two months, with Kokia visiting Belgium, France, Germany, Ireland and Poland.

== Conception ==
When Kokia wrote music throughout her career, she began to notice a division in her song-writing when she wanted to write songs about herself. There was a difference between songs written as "Kokia" (the musician), and "Akiko" (the person herself). Kokia described the simultaneously released album concept as "two different existences that live off of each other."

While Akiko Infinity Kokia is more intimate, Kokia Infinity Akiko deals with larger concepts.

The song "Infinity" is featured on both albums although the arrangements of the song on the two discs are completely different. The version on this album was described "a magnificent arrangement, like running through meadows," as opposed to the intimate tender sound of the Akiko Infinity Kokia version.

== Recording ==
The bulk of the album recording took place between December 2008 and early February 2009. Between December 15–17, Kokia recorded five tracks in single takes backed with studio musicians.

While some of the songs on the album were written specifically for it, many of them are older, unpublished songs. On January 6, Kokia replaced three older songs originally intended for the albums with newer tracks she had written.

"Dōke" was originally performed in 2002, and "Kono Mune no Kurushimi ga Itooshii Hodo ni Ikite" was performed at Kokia's special Akiko Yoshida Hikigatari Live: Piano to Akisuke concert in late 2004. "Usaghi" at the neoclassically themed Kokia 2006 Keep Moving concert in November 2006. Kokia wrote "Hana Utage" on March 13, 2007, after performing a concert at Minamihokke-ji in Takatori, Nara. "Hoshikuzu no Vocalize" was written on November 23, 2008, after thinking about her grandparents (her grandmother had died several days before, and her grandfather earlier in 2006).

On January 26, the final song for the album sessions was written ("Hajimari" (はじまり, Beginning) for Akiko Infinity Kokia), and on February 6, both albums were recorded in their entirety.

Kokia recorded musician Mihoko Ono performing the koto for her song "Hana Utage," the first time she has used the instrument in her career.

== Release ==
"Kokia Collection 2" cover, featuring Kokia Infinity Akiko.

The album was initially released in Japan in March 2009, through Victor Entertainment. It was released to music retailers and through online distribution services, much like Kokia's previous studio albums (Akiko Infinity Kokia was only released through Kokia's official site and as a digital download). The album was released two months later in France, during Kokia's European tour. The French version compiled both Kokia Infinity Akiko and Akiko Infinity Kokia together into a single 2-CD set.

Kokia Infinity Akiko was re-released in France as a part of a 3-CD set called Kokia Collection 2, on December 2, 2009. The box set also featured Akiko Infinity Kokia: Balance and Fairy Dance: Kokia Meets Ireland.

== Reception ==
The album reached #51 on the Japanese Oricon albums charts, selling 4,500 copies.

== Track listing ==
All songs written by Kokia.

| No. | Title | Arranger(s) | Length |
|---|---|---|---|
| 1. | "Hana Utage (花宴, Flower Party)" | Yasuhisa Yamamoto | 6:00 |
| 2. | "Usumomoiro no Kisetsu (うす桃色の季節, Pale Pink Season)" | Kiyohide Ura | 5:16 |
| 3. | "+Sing" | Yamamoto | 4:55 |
| 4. | "Dōke (道化, Antics)" | Ura | 6:00 |
| 5. | "Usaghi (Rabbit)" | Yamamoto | 4:27 |
| 6. | "Yoake (Rebirth) (夜明け～rebirth, Dawn (Rebirth))" | Daisuke Ehara | 4:31 |
| 7. | "Gematria (ゲマトリア, Gematoria)" | Shunsuke Kida | 4:48 |
| 8. | "Hoshikuzu no Vocalise (星屑のヴォカリーズ, Stardust Vocalise)" | Ehara | 3:57 |
| 9. | "Life Goes On" | Ura | 3:33 |
| 10. | "Senka no Hana (戦火の花, Flower of War)" | Kokia | 4:34 |
| 11. | "Kono Mune no Kurushimi ga Itooshii Hodo ni Ikite (この胸の苦しみが愛おしいほどに生きて, Living to the Point Where I Love This Pain in My Heart)" | Ura | 4:49 |
| 12. | "Infinity" | Yamamoto | 7:11 |

== Japan Sales Rankings ==
| Release | Chart | Peak position | First week sales | Sales total | Chart run |
|---|---|---|---|---|---|
| February 20, 2008 | Oricon Daily Albums Chart | 17 | | | |
| February 20, 2008 | Oricon Weekly Albums Chart | 42 | 4,653 | 7,765 | 4 weeks |
| February 20, 2008 | Oricon Yearly Albums Chart | | | | |

== Personnel ==
- Katsuhiko "Chara" Asano - mixing engineer (#5, #7, #12)
- Takeshi Arai - guitar (#2, #11)
- Chiei - g. guitar (#5)
- Eco - additional arrangement/piano (#1)
- Daisuke Ehara - arrangement/programming (#6, #8)
- Koichi Fujimoto - g. guitar (#7)
- Toshihiko Fujimi - publicist
- Takashi Furuta - drums (#4)
- Yuya Haraguchi - acoustic guitar (#3)
- Shigeyuki Hirano - director, mixing engineer (#6, #8, #10)
- Noriko Inose - photographer
- Hiroko Ishida - viola (#1, #12)
- Nao Ishizaka - hair designer
- Ayako Karasawa - cello (#1, #12)
- Emiko Kato - licence management
- Atsushi Kawahata - additional arrangement (#12), piano (#8, #10, #12)
- Hiroshi Kawasaki - mastering engineer
- Shunsuke Kida - arrangement/programming (#7)
- Kokia - arranger (#10), dress/styling, songwriter, producer, vocal chorus arrangement, vocals
- Masahiro Kuniyoshi - download sales
- Kazuhiro Matsuo - acoustic guitar (#4), guitars (#6)

"Dōke"
One of the songs that was chosen for Kokia's second greatest hits album.

"Infinity"
The title track of the album, in its Kokia Infinity Akiko form.

- Tsuyoshi Miyagawa - drums (#2, #11)
- Kaori Mori - make-up
- Kenji Nozaki - package sales
- Hiroyasu Okada - siku (#12)
- Mio Okamura Strings (#8)
- Mihoko Ono (Toone) - koto (#1)
- Yoshikazu Sasahara - mizing engineer (#1–4, #11)
- Ryosei Sato - fiddle (#4)
- Shin Eai-Sung - violin (#1, #12)
- Hisashi Sutoh - washtub bass (#3)
- Eiko Suzuki - art work assisting
- Ryoji Takai - bass (#2, #11), washtub bass (#4)
- Gen Tanabe - electric guitar (#5)
- Saburo Tanooka - accordion (#5)
- Hanako Uesato - violin (#1, #12)
- Kiyohide Ura - arrangement (#2, #4, #9, #11), keyboard (#2, #4, #11), piano/organ (#9), saxophone (#11)
- Eri Yaguchi - design assisting
- Yasuhisa Yamamoto (Usatrene Records) - arrangement (#1, #3, #5, #12), programming (#1, #5, #12), percussion (#1, #3–5, #12)
