= Fairy Dance: Kokia Meets Ireland =

Studio album by Kokia
- Released: September 24, 2008 (Japan); March 4, 2009 (France)
- Recorded: 2008
- Genre: Celtic, folk
- Length: 34:07; 29:08 (Japanese digital download)
- Label: Victor Entertainment, Wasabi Records
- Producer: Kokia

Kokia chronology
Kokia Complete Collection 1998-1999 (2008)	Fairy Dance: Kokia Meets Ireland (2008)	Christmas Gift (2008)

Fairy Dance: Kokia Meets Ireland (stylised as Fairy Dance ～KOKIA meets Ireland～) is Kokia's seventh studio album, released in September 2008. It is the third of four albums released in 2008 to celebrate her 10th anniversary as a singer. One song from the album, "Song of Pocchong (Shizuku no Uta)," features on Kokia's 2009 greatest hits collection Coquillage: The Best Collection II.

== Conception ==
Kokia first travelled to Ireland alone in 2000. She travelled to Ireland again in October 2006 to find inspiration for her music, and to scout for places and people to record with.

Kokia returned to Ireland again in February 2008, and recorded the album in a week with Sean Whelan and Puck Fair and local musicians, including violinist Niamh Varian-Barry.

== Song selection ==
Of the songs included in the album, five are covers and three are original Kokia songs.

Of the covers, three are traditional Celtic songs ("Black Is the Color," "Siúil A Rúin" and "Taimse im' Chodladh"). "Taimse im' Chodladh" and the chorus of "Siúil A Rúin" are sung in Irish. Two songs are Japanese kayōkyoku standards: "Soshū Yakyoku" (from the 1940 film Shina no Yoru) and "Kanashikute Yarikirenai" (originally by The Folk Crusaders in (1968)).

Of the three original compositions, two were composed specifically for the album ("Lydia (Fairy Dance)" and "Sono Mama de Ii (Be As You Are)"). "Song of Pocchong (Shizuku no Uta)" (song of pocchong～雫の歌, Song of a Drop of Water) is a rearranged version of the same song from Kokia's previous album, The Voice. It is slightly longer, and the kanji in the song's title is different (歌 for uta (song), instead of 唄).

== Release ==
The album was initially released in Japan in late September 2008. Unlike previous Ancoro era albums, Fairy Dance was not released in France until well after the Japanese release. it was released six month later, in March 2009. This meant that Fairy Dance was released after Christmas Gift in France.

Fairy Dance was released in France as a part of a 3-CD set called Kokia Collection 2, on December 2, 2009. The box set also featured Kokia Infinity Akiko: Balance and Akiko Infinity Kokia: Balance.

== Reception ==
The album reached #67 on the Japanese Oricon albums charts, selling 4,000 copies.

== Track listing ==
All songs arranged by Sean Whelan. Kokia's cover of Yoshiko Ōtaka's "Soshū Yakyoku" is not present on the Japanese digital download version of the album, but is present on the European release.

No.	Title	Lyrics	Music	Length
1.	"Lydia (Fairy Dance)"	Kokia	Kokia	3:56
2.	"Song of Pocchong (Shizuku no Uta) (song of pocchong～雫の歌, Song of a Drop of Water)"	Kokia	Kokia	3:46
3.	"Kanashikute Yarikirenai (悲しくてやりきれない, Unbearably Sad)"	Hachirō Satō	Kazuhiko Katō	4:22
4.	"Black Is the Color"	Traditional	Traditional	3:44
5.	"Soshū Yakyoku (蘇州夜曲, Suzhou Nocturne)"	Yaso Saijō	Ryoichi Hattori	4:59
6.	"Siúil A Rúin"	Traditional	Traditional	4:18
7.	"Sono Mama de Ii (Be As You Are) (そのままでいい～be as you are)"	Kokia	Kokia	4:46
8.	"Taimse im' Chodladh"	Traditional	Traditional	4:16

== Japan charts and sales ==
"Lydia (Fairy Dance)"
A sample from the title track, and one of the original Kokia compositions.

"Siúil A Rúin"
A sample of Kokia's cover of the traditional Irish song "Siúil A Rúin."

Release	Chart	Peak position	First week sales	Sales total
February 20, 2008	Oricon Weekly Albums Chart	67	2,715	4,121
