= The Voice (Kokia album) =

Studio album by Kokia
- Released: February 20, 2008 (Japan); February 28, 2008 (France)
- Recorded: 2007
- Genre: J-pop, folk
- Length: 1:01:52 (Japanese Edition); 1:03:07 (French Edition)
- Label: Victor Entertainment, Wasabi Records
- Producer: Kokia

Kokia chronology
Aigakikoeru: Listen for the Love (2006)	The Voice (2008)	Kokia Complete Collection 1998-1999 (2008)

French edition cover

Singles from The Voice
- 1. "Watashi ni Dekiru Koto" Released: September 16, 2007; 2. "Follow the Nightingale" Released: November 21, 2007

The Voice (stylised as The VOICE) is Kokia's sixth studio album, released in February 2008. It is the first of four album releases in 2008 celebrating her 10th anniversary as a singer.

Three songs from the album feature on Kokia's 2009 greatest hits collection Coquillage: The Best Collection II: "Ave Maria," "Chiisa na Uta" and "Everlasting." Also featured are "Say Goodbye and Good Day," the bonus track from the French edition, along with the Fairy Dance: Kokia Meets Ireland rearrangement of "Song of Pocchong."

In late 2009, "Lacrima" was chosen to be used as the ending theme song for the film Uyghur Kara Kita Shōnen.

== Background ==
In response to the 2007 Chūetsu offshore earthquake, Kokia wrote a charity song, "Watashi ni Dekiru Koto," after being contacted by one of her fans who lived in Kashiwazaki, Niigata. The fan sent copies of the song to the local FM station FM Pikkara, who put the song on heavy rotation. A month after the earthquake, Kokia performed at a special encouragement concert to 3,000 residents in Kashiwazaki, along with the Japan Self-Defense Forces' band. When Kokia returned from this concert, she wrote the lullaby "Lacrima," which also features on the album. Two months after the earthquake, the song was released as a CD locally, due to popular demand (featuring both "Watashi ni Dekiru Koto" and "Lacrima"). Both songs later feature on the album, though "Watashi ni Dekiru Koto" as a Japan-only bonus track. "Watashi ni Dekiru Koto" was later featured in a segment on the popular show Daremo Shiranai Nakeru Uta on December 9, 2008.

In November 2007, Kokia released "Follow the Nightingale," which was used as the opening theme song for the game Tales of Innocence. It was a commercial success, reaching #33 selling 12,000 copies (her fourth most sold single, as of 2010). The single's B-side, "Say Goodbye & Good Day" was used as the ending theme song for the game. It features on the French edition of The Voice as a bonus track.

Kokia also released a single "Tatta Hitotsu no Omoi" (たった１つの想い, Just One Thought) (the anime Gunslinger Girl: Il Teatrino's opening theme song) in January 2008 to commercial success (it sold over 10,000 copies), however the single was released through anime retailer label Marvelous Entertainment, instead of Kokia's regular retailer Victor Entertainment. Neither the leading track or its B-side "Umaretate no Shiro" (生まれたての白, Newborn White) feature on the album.

== Recording ==
Kokia first decided the theme for the album in May/June 2007. Kokia chose the album's title and concept based on what people always considered her strength in music. She generally chose album themes in the past based on lyrical messages, but for her 10th anniversary chose the theme to be her own voice. The album's neoclassical style and song selections were intended to show the entire range of Kokia's singing abilities. In an interview with Viviana, Kokia explained, "Simply put, I thought I'd made songs that only I could sing."

Kokia started focusing on recording the album in October 2007. Originally nine of the songs were planned to be recorded in November, however recording was briefly delayed due to Kokia catching a cold. It was resumed in late November. The album release date was officially announced in early December, before recording had finished. The final song recorded for the album was "Il Mare dei Suoni," on 8 December. The album had finished mastering on 13 December.

Many songs were written for the occasion, such as "Chiisa na Uta," however others were older songs "Nani mo Kamo ga Hoshi ni Natte" was originally performed by Kokia in concerts in 2003. "Todokimasu Yō ni" was performed at her June Garden concerts in 2005. She talked in detail about the creation of the song "Il Mare dei Suoni" in her blog in June 2006, which she had originally performed at her That's Why I Was Born solo live concert in 2003 (though it was originally titled "Sento nel Core" (It: Feel the Core)).

== Release ==
"Kokia Collection" cover, featuring The Voice.

Unlike Kokia's previous album, Aigakikoeru: Listen for the Love, it was released in Japan before in France. The Japanese edition was released on 20 February, eight days before the French edition.

The album was re-released in France as a part of a 3-CD set called Kokia Collection, on October 22, 2008. The album also featured 2006's Aigakikoeru: Listen for the Love 2008's and Christmas Gift, and features a cover similar to the Christmas Gift photoshoot cover.

== Reception ==
Professional ratings
Review scores
Source	Rating
CDJournal	(positive)

The album reached #42 on the Japanese Oricon albums charts, selling 8,000 copies.

CDJournal gave the album a positive review, noting Kokia's "wonderful natural sound." The Voice received an award from Adlib magazine in 2008, for the Domestic World/New-Age category. Adlib praised Kokia's "seven-coloured voice," as well as the wide range of genres on the album, encompassing classical, Irish folk music and Okinawan folk songs.

== Track listing ==
All songs written and produced by Kokia, except for "Ave Maria," which is a cover of the classical aria by Vladimir Fyodorovich Vavilov in Italian.

No.	Title	Arranger(s)	Length
1.	"Odoyaka na Shizukesa (Jōka) (穏やかな静けさ～浄歌, Calm Serenity: Purification Song)"	Yasuhisa Yamamoto	5:37
2.	"Follow the Nightingale"	Taisuke Sawachika	4:40
3.	"Ave Maria"	Sawachika	4:13
4.	"Todokimasu Yō ni (届きますように, So This Can Reach You)"	Kokia	3:25
5.	"Song of Pocchong (Shizuku no Uta) (ｓｏｎｇ ｏｆ ｐｏｃｃｈｏｎｇ～雫の唄, Song of a Drop of Water)"	Sawachika	3:33
6.	"Gomen ne. (ごめんね。, Sorry)"	Yamamoto	6:05
7.	"Lacrima (It: Tear)"	Kokia	5:23
8.	"Nani mo Kamo ga Hoshi ni Natte (何もかもが星になって, Anything Can Become a Star)"	Kokia	5:25
9.	"Il Mare dei Suoni (It: The Sea of Sounds)"	Kokia	6:23
10.	"Everlasting"	Sawachika	5:37
11.	"Chiisa na Uta (小さなうた, A Little Song)"	Sawachika	6:40

Japanese bonus track
No.	Title	Arranger(s)	Length
12.	"Watashi ni Dekiru Koto (私にできること, What I Can Do)"	Kokia	4:51

French bonus track
No.	Title	Arranger(s)	Length
12.	"Say Goodbye & Good Day"	Sawachika	6:06

== Japan Sales Rankings ==
"Follow the Nightingale"
A sample from the lead single, "Follow the Nightingale."

"Chiisa na Uta"
A sample the ballad "Chiisa na Uta," one of the four songs from The Voice to feature on Coquillage: The Best Collection II.

Release	Chart	Peak position	First week sales	Sales total	Chart run
February 20, 2008	Oricon Daily Albums Chart	17			
February 20, 2008	Oricon Weekly Albums Chart	42	4,653	7,765	4 weeks
February 20, 2008	Oricon Yearly Albums Chart				
