= Origin: Spirits of the Past =

2006 Japanese animated film

- Japanese theatrical poster
- Directed by: Keiichi Sugiyama
- Screenplay by: Nana Shiina; Naoko Kakimoto
- Story by: Umanosuke Iida
- Starring: Ryo Katsuji; Aoi Miyazaki; Yūko Kotegawa; Masaru Hamaguchi; Toshikazu Fukawa; Kenichi Endō; Ren Osugi
- Cinematography: Haruhide Ishiguro
- Edited by: Aya Hida
- Music by: Taku Iwasaki
- Production company: Gonzo
- Distributed by: Shochiku
- Release date: January 7, 2006
- Running time: 94 minutes
- Country: Japan
- Language: Japanese

Origin: Spirits of the Past, known in Japan as Silver-Haired Agito (Japanese: 銀色の髪のアギト, Hepburn: Gin'iro no Kami no Agito), is a 2006 Japanese animated science fiction film directed by Keiichi Sugiyama, written by Nana Shiina and Naoko Kakimoto, and was produced by Gonzo. The film stars the voices of Ryo Katsuji, Aoi Miyazaki, Yūko Kotegawa, Masaru Hamaguchi, Toshikazu Fukawa, Kenichi Endō and Ren Osugi. It premiered in Japan in January 2006, and premiered in the United States in September 2006 at the Fantastic Fest film festival in Austin, Texas.

== Plot ==
In the 24th century, Earth is a plant-strewn wasteland due to an ecocide caused by genetically modified trees arriving on the planet three centuries earlier. Japan is a dystopia ruled by the Forest, a huge expanse of sapient trees ruled the tree-like Druids, controls the nation's water supply for both trees and humans. Agito, a young boy, his father Agashi, and his friends Cain and Minka, live in Neutral City, a city at the edge of the Forest carved out of ruined skyscrapers. Neutral City acts as a buffer and bridge between the Forest and the militaristic nation of Ragna, which was established in part of the empty wasteland that now covers the rest of the planet. While the people of Neutral City work to co-exist peacefully with the trees of the Forest, Ragna aims to destroy the Forest to restore the Earth. One day, Agito and Cain race each other to see who can get to the water hole at the bottom of the city first. By disturbing the sanctity of the water hole and angering the Druids, the two boys are separated. After stumbling upon a large machine with cryogenic pods, Agito accidentally revives Toola, a young girl who has been asleep in the centuries since the plants arrived on Earth, and brings her to Neutral City.

Since Toola carries a Raban, a portable personal electronic device capable of communication and a variety of other tasks, the Forest fears that Shunack, a Ragna soldier awakened from his sleep, will use her Raban to locate an environmental defragmentation system (E.S.T.O.C.) to destroy it. The Forest sends a giant plant creature to stop the meeting between Shunack and Toola, but Shunack destroys it and reveals that he has been "enhanced"—he allowed himself to be genetically altered by the Forest to become stronger by using the trees' power. Convinced that finding E.S.T.O.C. is the only way to restore Earth, Toola joins Shunack in his quest over Agito's protestations. Agito consults his father Agashi, Neutral City's founder who has turned almost completely into a tree after overusing his enhanced powers. With few days left before becoming a tree completely, Agashi encourages his son to save the Forest from Shunack's plan, since destroying the trees would cause humanity's destruction. Agito journeys to the Forest and allows himself to be enhanced, his hair turning silver as a result.

Agito follows Shunack and Toola to E.S.T.O.C., a giant volcano converted into a mechanized, mobile weapon by Toola's father Dr. Sakul, the doctor who had begun the genetic research on the trees. A hologram of Dr. Sakul explains the story of how the research led to the world's current state, and he created E.S.T.O.C. as the best-possible safeguard against the altered trees. After betraying the Ragna army, Shunack reveals that, as one of the scientists who worked on the original genetic alteration experiments centuries ago, his impatience in speeding up the alteration process resulted in the catastrophic invasion of the mutant trees. Shunack intends to activate E.S.T.O.C. near Neutral City to restore Earth and right the guilt that has been plaguing him since the invasion. As the Ragna army helps in fighting E.S.T.O.C., Agito duels with Shunack. Agito transforms into a tree and absorbs Shunack, allowing Toola to shut down E.S.T.O.C. and automatically trigger its self-destruction.

Meanwhile, Agito's consciousness remains intact on another plane, and there the Forest reveals to him the truth about the relationship between itself and the humans. Agito learns that the genetic admixture that gives humans extraordinary strength and eventually turns them into trees is really a two-way exchange; it also changes the Forest, causing trees to give birth to new humans in giant fruits. Having become one with the Forest, Shunack is now at peace and no longer intends to fight Agito. Realizing that Agito can teach humanity that there is no need for either hostility or separation between themselves and the trees, the Forest returns Agito to his true form, allowing him and Toola to flee E.S.T.O.C.'s destruction. With the humans and the Forest saved, Agito brings peace between humans and the trees. Toola throws her Raban off a ledge down into the depths of the Forest, learning to live in harmony with the trees at last.

== Cast ==
Characters	Japanese voice actor	English dubbing actor
Agito	Ryō Katsuji	Christopher Patton
Young Agito	Yumiko Kobayashi	
Toola	Aoi Miyazaki	Carrie Savage
Yolda	Yūko Kotegawa	Pam Dougherty
Cain	Masaru Hamaguchi	John Burgmeier
Hajan	Toshikazu Fukawa	Christopher Sabat
Shunack	Kenichi Endō	Robert McCollum
Agashi	Ren Ōsugi	R. Bruce Elliot
Minka	Omi Minami	Laura Bailey
Jessica	Atsuko Yuya	Colleen Clinkenbeard
Bērui	Kurumi Mamiya	Luci Christian
Zērui	Tomoko Kaneda	Monica Rial
Doctor Sakul	Hideyuki Tanaka	Kent Williams
Nabe Oyagi	Mugihito	Grant James
Agohige	Katsuhisa Hōki	
Kuchihige	Takehiro Koyama	
Oyakata	Hiroshi Naka	
The Soldier	Mitsuaki Hoshino	
Announcer	Yukari Horie	

== Soundtrack ==
Origin: Spirits of the Past

Soundtrack album by Taku Iwasaki
- Released: January 7, 2006
- Label: Victor Entertainment

The film soundtrack was composed by Taku Iwasaki and released on January 7, 2006, by Victor Entertainment. The score was performed by the Warsaw Philharmonic Orchestra.

All pieces composed by Taku Iwasaki, except where noted.

1. "Mori no Kioku"
2. "Chouwa oto (With Reflection)" (Kokia)
3. "Agito to Kain"
4. "Doruido"
5. "Toola"
6. "Dai Kouzui"
7. "Chuuritsu Toshi"
8. "Taizai Kyoka"
9. "Ragna Gun"
10. Houshi Katsudou"
11. "Agito to Toola 1"
12. "Agashi"
13. "Kako Kara Kita Otoko"
14. "Sudachi"
15. "Toria City"
16. "Minka no Kanashimi"
17. "Kikan Shinden"
18. "Kyouka Karada"
19. "Agito to Toola 2"
20. "Chikara no Bousou"
21. "Yolda no Omoi"
22. "Tsuki ga Kowareta Hi"
23. "Chikyuu Ryokka Project"
24. "Istolk Shidou"
25. "Soukougeki"
26. "Istolk wo Yamero"
27. "Dai Funka (Agito to Toola 3)"
28. "Boku Tachi no Mirai no Tame ni"
29. "Mori to Nin wo Tsunagu Mono"
30. "Ai no Melody (Soundtrack Version)" (Kokia)
31. "M-10a – M-10b"
32. "M-21a"
33. "M-21b"
34. "M-23"

== Reception ==
Anime News Network praised the animation of the film and described it as "visually and audibly, Origin is everything one has come to expect from a top-end Gonzo production: great artistry, quality animation, excellent and well-integrated CG work, and an ambitious soundtrack. It is, in fact, the most impressive-looking anime movie to come out in North America since Steamboy.

== See also ==
- List of animated feature films
- Terraforming in popular culture
