= Kawaranai Koto (Since 1976) =

Single by Kokia

from the album Remember Me
- Released: May 21, 2003
- Genre: J-pop
- Length: 4:57
- Label: Victor Entertainment
- Songwriter: Kokia
- Producer: Taisuke Sawachika

Kokia singles chronology
"Ningen tte Sonna Mono ne" (2002)	"Kawaranai Koto (Since 1976)" (2003)	"The Power of Smile/Remember the Kiss" (2003)

"Kawaranai Koto (Since 1976)" (かわらないこと～ｓｉｎｃｅ１９７６～, Unchanging Thing (Since 1976)) is Kokia's 9th single, released on May 21, 2003. It is Kokia's second most commercially successful single after "The Power of Smile/Remember the Kiss," due to being used as the daytime TV drama Itoshiki Mono e's theme song.

== Background ==
This single was the Kokia's first to be released under Victor Entertainment management, after being managed under Gai Records for her second album Trip Trip and Pony Canyon for her debut Songbird. Previous to this single, Kokia had found severely limited chart success. Despite releasing two albums and 8 singles, only one of these had charted at all, "Aishiteiru Kara" at #99.

== Promotion ==
Other than "Kawaranai Koto (Since 1976)" being featured in Itoshiki Mono e, the single was promoted in a variety of ways. The B-side "Tell Tell Bōzu" was used as the second ending theme song to the anime Hungry Heart: Wild Striker. Kokia was featured in many music-related and fashion-related magazines in May 2003, such as "Barfout," "Caz," "CD Hits," "Gekkan Piano," "Girl Pop," "Grand Magasin," "What's In?" and "Zappy."

== Composition ==
"Kawaranai Koto (Since 1976)" is a mid-tempo pop song, featuring a sparse piano, percussion and occasional strings arrangement. The two choruses, however, feature a band arrangement with added guitars and percussion. The lyrics express somebody thanking a person they have been watching over and protecting for making them realise how much they loved them, despite being unable to express this to them. The lyrics ask the person's beloved to "instead of say thank you, look at me."

== Music video ==
Kokia in the music video for "Kawaranai Koto (Since 1976)."

The music video was directed by Jun Hara (原淳). The majority of the clip is made up of double exposed shots spliced together. In these shots, there three main sequences: one featuring Kokia and a man dressed in black in a brown field, one featuring Kokia in a tall room with flowing curtains in which she sings the song, and one in which a child holds a red ball in an alleyway, as Kokia stands near to him. Other scenes the child, as well as of the house with tall, flowing curtains are shown. One distinctive shot in the piece is in the brown field, where a small green plant with red flowers is shown near the beginning and ending of the clip. At the beginning, there is only one flower, however at the end there are two.

== Reception ==
The song debuted at #49 in its first week, selling 4,000 copies. A long selling single, it charted in the low top 50 for four weeks, peaking at #47. After seven weeks in the top 100 and an additional four between 100 and 200, the single managed to sell a total of 26,000 copies.

== Track listing ==
No.	Title	Writer(s)	Arranger(s)	Length
1.	"Kawaranai Koto (Since 1976)"	Kokia	Taisuke Sawachika	4:57
2.	"Tell Tell Bōzu (ｔｅｌｌ ｔｅｌｌ 坊主, Tell Tell Teru Teru Bōzu)"	Kokia	Sawachika	5:00
3.	"Kawaranai Koto (Since 1976) (Instrumental Version)"	Kokia	Sawachika	4:57
4.	"Tell Tell Bōzu (Instrumental Version)"	Kokia	Sawachika	4:57
Total length:				19:51

== Japan Sales Rankings ==
"Kawaranai Koto (Since 1976)"
A clip from the leading track, "Kawaranai Koto (Since 1976)."

"Tell Tell Bōzu"
A clip from the B-side, "Tell Tell Bōzu."

Release	Chart	Peak position	First week sales	Sales total	Chart run
May 21, 2003	Oricon daily singles chart				
May 21, 2003	Oricon weekly singles chart	47	4,200	26,000	11 weeks
May 21, 2003	Oricon yearly singles chart				
