= Kokia (singer) =

- KOKIA
- Born: Akiko Yoshida; July 22, 1976 (age 50); Tokyo, Japan
- Occupations: Singer; songwriter
- Years active: 1998–present
- Musical career
- Genres: Pop; folk; world music; new age music
- Labels: Pony Canyon (JP, 1998–2000); Victor (JP, 2001–present); Kazé/Wasabi (FR); Universal (TW, 2011–present)
- Website: www.kokia.com

Akiko Yoshida (吉田亜紀子, Yoshida Akiko; born July 22, 1976) is a Japanese singer and songwriter performing under the stage name Kokia (styled KOKIA). Her most well known songs are "Arigatō..." (ありがとう..., Thank You) (which reached number 2 in Hong Kong when it was covered by Sammi Cheng) and "The Power of Smile" (which topped at No. 8 in the singles chart). She is also recognized for her numerous contributions to anime/game soundtracks, the most notable being "Ai no Melody/Chōwa Oto (With Reflection)" for the film Origin: Spirits of the Past, "Follow the Nightingale" for the game Tales of Innocence, "Tatta Hitotsu no Omoi" for the anime Gunslinger Girl: Il Teatrino, "Dance of the Spirits" for the anime The Ancient Magus' Bride and "For Little Tail" for the game Tail Concerto.

Kokia often performs in Europe, basing her activities in Paris and releasing music through Wasabi Records, a subsidiary of Kazé.

== Biography ==
=== Early life, Pony Canyon debut ===
Kokia was born in 1976. She started playing the violin when she was two and a half years old, but preferred the family piano. Often instead of playing with toys, Kokia played with the family piano. Kokia remembers putting picture books on the music stand and creating music that represented the scenes.

When Kokia was 10, she went abroad to America with her sister Kyoko to study at the Summer music school (and did so again when she was 14). In high school, she studied in vocal music and opera, later majoring in opera at the Toho Gakuen School of Music.

While at university, a friend gave a demo tape Kokia had recorded to a record executive. Kokia was then signed to Pony Canyon, and debuted in 1998 while still at university. She created her stage name by reversing the syllables of her birth name, Akiko (something she had done as a game when she was very young). Her first released song, "For Little Tail", was used as the opening theme song for the game Tail Concerto (although this was released as the secondary track to the "Road to Glory" single album.)

The leading single from the album, "Arigatō..." (ありがとう...; "Thank You"), found success in Hong Kong. It was awarded third in the 1999 Hong Kong International Popular Song Award. Hong Kong entertainer Sammi Cheng covered the song, and released it as the eponymous track from her album Arigatou in October 1999. The song became a big hit in Hong Kong, reaching to no2 in the pop charts there.

=== Victor Entertainment ===
After the release of her debut album, Kokia did not continue to release music with Pony Canyon. Her first releases after this were five songs for Luna Sea vocalist Ryuichi Kawamura's production project, ЯKS, in 2000. The album was released under Victor Entertainment, heralding in Kokia's relationship with the label. In 2001, she re-debuted in proper under Victor, and released three singles.

Kokia continued to have success throughout Asia, with her music used in Asia-wide ad campaigns. In 2001, she performed at two high-profile Chinese concerts: an anti-drugs concert to 30,000 people with the so-called Four Heavenly Kings of Hong Kong entertainment (Jacky Cheung, Andy Lau, Aaron Kwok and Leon Lai), and also to over 120,000 people at a 2001 new year's countdown event in Taiwan. In January 2002, Kokia released her second album, Trip Trip, her first album to be self-produced.

In 2003, however, Kokia first gained public notice. Her single "Kawaranai Koto (Since 1976)" was used as the drama Itoshiki Mono e's theme song, breaking Kokia into the top 50. Her biggest hit, however, was "The Power of Smile/Remember the Kiss". It gained notoriety after being used in a Kao haircare commercial. After which, Kokia was asked to perform on popular music show Music Station. The single broke the top 20 in Japan and was certified gold by the RIAJ. The resulting album, Remember Me, also broke the top 20, and sold over 45,000 copies.

Her Pony Canyon-era songs "I Catch a Cold" and "Shiroi Yuki" (白い雪; "White Snow") were used in the soundtrack for the popular Chinese drama At the Dolphin Bay in 2003.

Kokia's fourth album Uta ga Chikara (released in 2004) also found modest success, selling 20,000 copies. The biggest single from this album, "Yume ga Chikara", was used as the encouragement song for the Japan team at the 2004 Athens Olympic games.

While Kokia has been associated with game/anime music since her debut, it was in 2006 when a theme song of hers became most successful. Her single "Ai no Melody/Chōwa Oto (With Reflection)" was used as the two theme songs for the anime film Origin: Spirits of the Past, and it reached number 30 on Oricon's single charts.

In February 2006, Kokia released her greatest hits collection, Pearl: The Best Collection, and a greatest video clips collection, Jewel: The Best Video Collection. The best collection reached number 19 on the albums charts.

=== Anco and Co., France ===
From 2006 onwards, Kokia began working in European markets, as well as taking greater control over her musical releases. In January, she held her first European concert in Paris, and performed at the Midem music industry trade fair. Pearl was released a month earlier than its Japanese release throughout France and Spain.

In June 2006, Kokia decided to set up her own production company separate from Victor Entertainment, called Anco & Co., after desiring more creative control over her works. In November, she debuted in France with the anime-based retailer Wasabi Records, releasing her 5th album, Aigakikoeru: Listen for the Love, there six months before its Japanese release.

In November 2007, Kokia had her second successful game/anime tie-up single, with "Follow the Nightingale". The song, used for the game Tales of Innocence, reached number 30 on Oricon.

Kokia's greater creative control allowed for her music to be released at a much greater pace. In 2008, Kokia released three albums: the neoclassical The Voice, the Ireland-themed album Fairy Dance and her first Christmas album Christmas Gift. In 2009, Kokia released two albums simultaneously (Kokia Infinity Akiko: Balance and Akiko Infinity Kokia: Balance) to celebrate her 10th anniversary. She also held her first world tour, with performances in Japan, France, Ireland, Poland, Belgium and Germany.

For Kokia's 11th album, Real World, she travelled to the Tunisian Sahara desert for inspiration.

In 2014, she sang at a number of events in collaboration with Billboard Live Japan which lead up to her first performance with a full orchestra in December 2014, where she sang with the Nihon philharmonic orchestra in collaboration with Billboard Japan.

In 2017, she sang a memorial song at the joint memorial service for the 10th anniversary of the Chūetsu offshore earthquake (hosted by Kashiwazaki City and Kariwa Village).

Since 2017, she has been releasing animal-themed albums as part of the tontonton project, under the Kokia Jirushi.

While the concert was canceled due to COVID-19, KOKIA started the live streaming "1 to 1 Live for you" in April 2020. This live streaming is often held on the official KOKIA channel on YouTube. In 2020, she started to distribute the singles digitally while using TuneCore, a music digital distribution service. In 2020, she moved to London, England. In 2023, after three years in London, she returned to Japan.

From 2021 onward, Kokia continued releasing work through her own channels. In 2021, she released the album この世界のかたすみで on January 1 and the concert DVD THE MISSING PIECE & Missing You on October 5. In 2022, she released 銀のキツネと金の紅茶を on April 29 and Animal CD vol.4 on September 30.

In 2023, she marked her 25th anniversary with the Tokyo Opera City concerts KOKIA 25th Anniversary concert 2023 "you and me" in April, and released the digital anthology album The Lighthouse in November. In 2024, she began the radio program The Essence of Music on October 6, released the anthology album essence -25th Anniversary All Time Best- on November 20, and held the strings concert KOKIA 2024 Strings concert “SHI-NA-RU” at Suntory Hall Blue Rose in November. In 2025, she presented KOKIA LAYERS 2025 – lights and shadow –, billed as the concluding chapter of the LAYERS music-stage project. In 2026, she began the weekly radio program Kotodama Potori on January 4 through MUSIC BIRD's community FM service, and released the album LAYERS on February 22. In February 2026, Kokia opened Cafe and Gallery Hotori (Cafe and Gallery ほとり), a café and gallery she produces in Kichijōji Higashi-chō, Musashino, Tokyo; its grand opening was held on February 23.

== Artistry ==
=== Voice ===
Her voice is often praised by critics, for its clarity of sound, and she is highly rated as a live singer. In 2004, on the TV show Daimei no Nai Ongaku-kai 21 (題名のない音楽会21), Kokia attempted to break the Guinness World Record for the longest note held. In her a cappella performance of 'O Sole Mio, she held a note for 29.5 seconds, but did not break the record.

=== Song writing ===
Since her second album, Trip Trip, Kokia has written every original song that appears on her albums. Kokia usually writes all the music for the game/anime OSTs songs in which she appears (though this is not a rule, and some songs have been written by others).

Kokia writes the majority of her songs in Japanese, though many are in English or partial English (such as "The Rule of the Universe", "Say Hi!!", and "So Sad So Bad".). She occasionally branches into different languages, such as Italian ("Il Mare dei Suoni", "Insonnia.") and Irish ("Taimse im' chodhadh" and "Siuil a Run" from her Irish-themed album Fairy Dance).

Occasionally in songs, such as "Chōwa Oto" (調和 ｏｔｏ, Harmony, Sound) and "Follow the Nightingale", Kokia writes lyrics in code. For both of these songs, they featured reversed syllables (such as the lyric "nimiunooto denzush", when reversed gives "Oto no umi ni shizunde" (音の海に 沈んで; "sinking in a sea of sound")). In "Chōwa Oto", Kokia also has a separate code (the numbers 3 25 15 21 23 and 1) which correspond to the letters of the English alphabet (1=A, 26=Z) to write the song's name in wāpuro rōmaji (C Y O U W A).

=== Musical style ===
Kokia’s work has generally been situated within J-pop while drawing on folk and “world/new-age” colors; AllMusic classifies her under Pop/Rock and International with a “Japanese Traditions” style tag. Trained in classical voice at Toho Gakuen, she often blends choral textures, orchestral accompaniment, and operatic gestures with pop songwriting. In 2008, her album The Voice (stylised as The VOICE) received Adlib magazine’s Adlib Awards in the Domestic World/New-Age category, underscoring that reception.

Her interest in Celtic/Irish idioms is heard on the Ireland-recorded album Fairy Dance ~KOKIA meets Ireland~, a collaboration with local musicians that her label described as a “Celtic healing album.”

Critics have noted how some anime/game themes employ chant-like writing, layered choir and “opera-esque” passages; for example, reviews of “Follow the Nightingale” (Tales of Innocence) and “Karma” (Phantom: Requiem for the Phantom) highlight these neoclassical/dark-wave-like sonorities.

Separate from her originals, Kokia has issued jazz-standard cover sets (Watching from Above in 2016; Watching from Above 2 in 2019, first released digitally in 2023), featuring material such as “Fever,” “Blue Skies,” and “One Note Samba.”

== Personal life ==
Violinist Kyoko Yoshida is Kokia's older sister, and also attended the Toho Gakuen School of Music.

Kokia's grandfather was the manager of a Japanese shipbuilding company. She created a short film, "Ojii-chan no Tulip" (おじいちゃんのチューリップ; "Granddad's Tulips"), and a song ("Grandfather's Ship") in his honour.

Kokia was raised as a Christian, and attended Sunday mass from a young age. She writes many of her songs about God, such as "Why Do I Sing?", "Everlasting", "Inori ni mo Nita Utsukushii Sekai" (祈りにも似た美しい世界) and "Sei Naru Yoru ni" (聖なる夜に; "In the Holy Night").

Kokia has done humanitarian work for various causes. At high school, she was a member of the volunteer committee, and strived to help the disabled, elderly and AIDS victims. She has performed at a concert for drug abuse, supported the Japanese Social Welfare Organisation (社会福祉法人), and released a special charity single for the victims of the 2007 Niigata earthquake. Kokia also feels great sympathy for the September 11 attacks. She gave out 10,000 copies of a special EP, Music Gift, on the streets of New York City in memory of the attacks. Many of Kokia's songs are messages about humanitarian/environmental causes, or about ways for people to live their lives better. Kokia primarily makes songs about love and peace.

Kokia is an avid dog lover. Throughout most of the 2000s, she owned four dogs: Donna, Muta, Nero and Titti. However, Donna died in February 2010. She has made references to dogs in several of her songs, such as "Shiroi Inu to Odoru Yoru" (白い犬と踊る夜; "Night Dancing with a White Dog"), and in "Say Hi!!", where the lyrics speak of "driving to the beach to play with our Donna." Many of her blog posts are centred around her dogs, with a special category dedicated to these posts.

== Discography ==
- Songbird (1999)
- Trip Trip (2002)
- Remember Me (2003)
- Uta ga Chikara (2004)
- Aigakikoeru: Listen for the Love (2006)
- The Voice (2008)
- Fairy Dance: Kokia Meets Ireland (2008)
- Christmas Gift (2008)
- Kokia Infinity Akiko: Balance (2009)
- Akiko Infinity Kokia: Balance (2009)
- Real World (2010)
- Moment (2010)
- Kokoro Bakari (2012)
- Where to Go My Love? (2013)
- Color of life (live in 15th anniversary concert) (2014)
- I Found You (2015)
- Tokyo Mermaid (2018)

KOKIA Jirushi limited album

- Watching from Above (2016)
- Animal CD vol.1 (2017)
- Animal CD vol.2 (2018)
- Watching from Above 2 (2019)
- Animal CD vol.3 (2020)
- Hoshi no uta kaze no naka (2020)
- Konosekai no katasumide (2021)

== Books ==
- Mama no daijisan, SHUFU TO SEIKATSU SHA, 2019, ISBN 978-4391153125
- Happy ryoku—oyako no "Happy" wo sodateru, ASA Publishing Co., Ltd.,2019, ISBN 978-4866671420
