= The Power of Smile/Remember the Kiss =

Single by Kokia

from the album Remember Me
- Released: September 24, 2003
- Genre: J-pop
- Length: 4:10; 5:34
- Label: Victor Entertainment
- Songwriter: Kokia
- Producers: Junichi "Igao" Igarashi, Taisuke Sawachika

Kokia singles chronology
"Kawaranai Koto (Since 1976)" (2003)	"The Power of Smile/Remember the Kiss" (2003)	"So Much Love for You" (2004)

"The Power of Smile/Remember the Kiss" is Kokia's 10th single, released on September 24, 2003. It is currently Kokia's most commercially successful single, after being used as the Kao Essential Damage Care shampoo commercials in 2003, featuring actress Yūko Takeuchi.

== Background ==
This single was the second of Kokia's to be released under Victor Entertainment management, after being managed under Gai Records for her second album Trip Trip and Pony Canyon for her debut Songbird. "The Power of Smile/Remember the Kiss" was Kokia's first single released after her long-charting hit "Kawaranai Koto (Since 1976)," which had been used as the daytime TV drama Itoshiki Mono e's theme song. Despite the song barely breaking the top 50 Oricon chart, it managed to sell 26,000 copies. And is listed as gold on the RIAJ Japanese chart database

== Promotion ==
Other than through Kao commercials featuring "The Power of Smile," the single was promoted in a variety of ways. Kokia was featured in September issues of magazines CD Data, CD-Hits, Weekly Oricon and What's In?, and appeared on a multitude of radio shows at the time. Kokia appeared on popular TV show Music Station to perform the song on October 17, more than three weeks after the single's release. This was the first time that she had appeared on the program.

The music video for "Remember the Kiss" was played after episodes of TV show Saku Saku throughout December 2003, and featured often in the music video shows Hot Wave and V-Clips.

== Composition ==
"The Power of Smile" is an upbeat pop song, backed with piano, guitar and percussion. It begins with an introduction featuring only piano, guitar and Kokia's voice. This leads into verses and choruses arranged with percussion, with heavier layering of percussion around the choruses. The initial sparsely arranged section repeats itself for a short instrumental section in the song, as well as in the song's refrain. The song ends with a heavily struck piano note and Kokia's voice fading away, along with faint giggling songs from Kokia. The lyrics describe somebody walking along, humming to themselves to the music of a portable music player. The protagonist of the song expresses their happiness, and how they want to give someone they like "a smile that boils up into them." They then describe how powerful a smile is, and how it "projects a way of life" and how contagious smiles are.

"Remember the Kiss" is a sentimental ballad, arranged by piano and additional strings. The lyrics express a sentiment on how people can be united with singing and thinking of kisses. Kokia notes that while peoples' languages, cultures and skin colors may be different, kisses are the same for everybody. The chorus is a repetition of the line "remember the kiss, these lips we have are meant to sing a love." The song was inspired by the events of the September 11 attacks, and is a prayer for love and peace written by Kokia.

== Re-recordings ==
Kokia has re-recorded both songs several times in her career. Other than the standard version, Kokia recorded a bossa nova version of "The Power of Smile" for her greatest hits album Pearl: The Best Collection in 2006, called "The Power of Smile (A Gentle Breeze)."

"Remember the Kiss" has currently been re-recorded four times in Kokia's career. While the original Taisuke Sawachika arranged version appears on the single, an acoustic version called "Remember the Kiss (Duet "Kokia & Piano")" appears on the album Remember Me, released several months after the single. Much like "The Power of Smile," a new version of the song featured on her greatest hits album, "Remember the Kiss (A Wish)," however this version was just a previously unused version and was not especially recorded for the collection. On her 2006 album Aigakikoeru: Listen for the Love, a piano-backed English version arranged by Toshiya Shioiri featured as a bonus track on the French edition of the album. In early September 2008, Kokia recorded an English version of the song backed by a church choir at the Institutional Church of God in Brooklyn, New York. This version features as a bonus track on the Japanese version of Kokia's Christmas album Christmas Gift, released in November 2008 and also on Kokia's free release EP Music Gift that was handed out in New York in December 2008.

== Music videos ==
Two music videos were produced for this single, one for "The Power of Smile," and the other for "Remember the Kiss (Duet "Kokia & Piano")," the acoustic version of "Remember the Kiss" featured on Remember Me. They were directed by Shin'ichi Kudō and Tsuyoshi Inoue respectively.

The video for "The Power of Smile" begins by featuring Kokia against a white background, where flowers start to be drawn behind her. The drawn flowers are replaced with real grass, and the next scene shows Kokia singing in a field at twilight. Static photos are shown of small-town shops, such as a grocers and a parasol store. Kokia then moves between each frame and takes something (such as an orange or a parasol), which starts the other people in the photos moving. The remainder of the video is made up of clips of Kokia in a white room, featuring screens filled with people of a variety of cultures/nationalities, as well as scenes with Kokia walking along a road with her parasol and more scenes of Kokia against the white background and in the field at twilight.

The video for "Remember the Kiss" is shot entirely in a white room, with a grand piano. Kokia either stands near or upon the piano while singing the song, or stands just by herself without the piano in view. In one scene, Kokia holds a watering can, and pours water onto the piano. The piano then starts to burst with drawn green leaves. The leaves turn into great vines, which reach up to the sun in the sky. Candles begins to appear at Kokia's feet, and in the final scene, Kokia walks around a drawing of the planet, as trees grow from it. All drawings in the video are stylised in a way reminiscent of children's drawings.

== Reception ==
The song debuted at #15 in its first week, selling 8,000 copies. The single spent a total of five weeks in the top 30, selling roughly 5,000 copies per week. Two weeks after falling out of the top 30, the single dropped out of the top 100, and nine weeks after its initial release stopped starting in the top 200. In its total chart run, the single managed to sell 32,000 copies, making this single Kokia's most commercially successful release. The single was certified gold for 100,000 copies shipped by the RIAJ.

Critically, CDJournal gave the single a star of recommendation (an award reserved for CDJournal reviewers' favourite musical releases). The reviewer praised "The Power of Smile"'s "Nashville" power pop sound, along with its fresh vocals. Music critic Takeshi Ōsuka called the song "high quality" and likened her falsetto voice to Kate Bush, however found her Japanese lyrics mediocre. CDJournal called "Remember the Kiss" a "magnificent ballad, reminiscent of journey of love and youthfulness."

== Track listing ==
No.	Title	Writer(s)	Arranger(s)	Length
1.	"The Power of Smile"	Kokia	Junichi "Igao" Igarashi	4:10
2.	"Remember the Kiss"	Kokia	Taisuke Sawachika	5:34
3.	"The Power of Smile (Instrumental Version)"	Kokia	Igarashi	4:10
4.	"Remember the Kiss (Instrumental Version)"	Kokia	Sawachika	5:31
Total length:				19:25

== Japan Sales Rankings ==
Release	Chart	Peak position	First week sales	Sales total	Chart run
September 24, 2003	Oricon daily singles chart	12			
September 24, 2003	Oricon weekly singles chart	15	7,900	32,000	9 weeks
September 24, 2003	Oricon yearly singles chart				
