= Mili Pictures Worldwide =

- Industry: Computer animation; Motion pictures
- Founded: 2012
- Headquarters: Shanghai, China
- Website: milipictures.com

Mili Pictures Worldwide (Chinese: 米粒影业) is a feature film animation company based in Shanghai, China. The company's first film, Dragon Nest: Warriors' Dawn, based on the online game Dragon Nest, was released in China in July 2014. The company opened an office in Los Angeles, California in spring 2014, headed by producer Bill Borden (producer of High School Musical and other films). The company's most recent feature project, Ping Pong Rabbit, filmed in Los Angeles. Ping Pong Rabbit was directed by Mike Johnson, who was nominated for the 2005 Academy Award for Best Animated Feature as co-director (with Tim Burton) of Corpse Bride.

== Filmography ==
- 2014: Dragon Nest: Warriors' Dawn
- 2015: The Three Little Pigs and the Lamp
- 2016: Throne of Elves
- 2017-2018: Shen Qi Huan Qi Tan
- 2019: Ping Pong Rabbit
- 2021: Dogtanian and the Three Muskehounds (co-production with BRB Internacional)
