= Real World (album) =

Studio album by Kokia
- Released: March 31, 2010 (Japan); April 7, 2010 (France)
- Recorded: 2009
- Genre: J-pop, folk
- Length: 1:13:08
- Label: Victor Entertainment(Japan); Wasabi Records (France)
- Producer: Kokia

Kokia chronology
Coquillage: The Best Collection II (2009)	Real World (2010)	Musique a la Carte (2010)

Singles from Real World
- 1. "Kimi o Sagashite/Last Love Song" Released: August 5, 2009; 2. "Single Mother/Christmas no Hibiki" Released: November 18, 2009; 3. "Kodoku na Ikimono/Ano Hi no Watashi ni" Released: March 17, 2010; 4. "Road to Glory" Released: August 18, 2010

Real World (stylised as REAL WORLD) is Kokia's 11th studio album, released on March 31, 2010. Kokia travelled to the Tunisian Sahara for inspiration for songs on the album. Because of this, much of the promotional material is themed around her trip to Tunisia, including the album booklet and the music video for "The Woman".

== Background ==
Before the album, three digital singles were released over eight months. Dubbed the Life Trilogy (Life Trilogy ～いのちの3部作～), the three singles featured message songs for humanity. "Kimi o Sagashite/Last Love Song" (君をさがして/last love song, I Search for You) was the first of these, released in August. "Kimi o Sagashite" asked the question "What is life, and why does it disappear/why does the end come?" in its lyrics. The second single was "Single Mother/Christmas no Hibiki" (single mother / クリスマスの響き, Echo of Christmas), released in December. "Single Mother" was an autobiographical story about the unreplaceable bonds Kokia has to her mother. The final, "Kodoku na Ikimono/Ano Hi no Watashi ni" (孤独な生きもの/あの日の私に, Lonely Living Things/To Me on That Day), was released in March two weeks before the album's Japanese release. The song has a message that people have the power to change sadness and loneliness with kindness.

All three singles were billed as double A-sides, featuring four tracks and a digital booklet each. Each single featured an original B-side not listed in the title, as well as a cover of a Western artist's song (Louis Armstrong's "What a Wonderful World", Charlie Chaplin's "Smile" and The Beatles' "The Long and Winding Road" respectively). Only the first track from each EP features on the album.

This album is Kokia's first since her second greatest hits collection, Coquillage: The Best Collection II.

"U-Cha-Cha" is a song Kokia originally performed live in concerts in 2002, at her first solo concert "That's Why I Was Born".

== Conception ==
Kokia first planned to release an album in March 2010, however had no solid plans for a theme. However, after sharing a meal with a Japanese cameraman friend of hers when she visited Paris for concerts (June 2009), he suggested she travel to Tunisia.

She travelled to Tunisia in November 2009 for roughly a week and a half. Inspired by the scenery, Kokia chose the themes of life and death, the Earth and about womanhood.

Eight of the 14 songs on the album were written about her experiences in Tunisia: "Birth", "Kodoku na Ikimono", "Kono Chikyū ga Marui Okage de", "Love Is Us, Love Is Earth", "Oto no Tabibito", "Real World", "Saishū Jōei" and "Watashi ga Mita Mono". The songs were inspired by many aspects of the trip, instead of solely from visiting the Sahara desert. "Birth" was inspired by a visit to the Chott el Djerid lake.

Recording for the Tunisia-inspired songs from the album began in late December, after Kokia finished her Jū Ni Gatsu no Okurimono tour. However, not all of them had been written by this point. The album was fully completed in late February.

== Promotion ==
The song "Road to Glory: For Dragon Nest" was used as the theme song for the Hangame Japan online game Dragon Nest. Tachibana from the Dragon Nest Japan management team, when posting news about the theme song, believed the song fitted well with the world outlook in the game, and felt moved by the song.

A music video for the final track on the album, "The Woman", was created. It was based around footage of Kokia in the Tunisian Sahara that was filmed while the photos for the CD jacket were being taken. The song was specifically written before her trip to Tunisia, as a central song that summed up she wanted the album to become. The music video is Kokia's first in four years, since 2006's "Ai no Melody (愛のメロディー, Melody of Love)" The video was to be shown from a screen on the Twin21 building in the Osaka Business Park during album promotion, at five points during the day.

In April, Kokia performed a tour in promotion for the album, Oto no Tabibito. It had four dates across Japan.

== Reception ==
The album debuted at #14 on Oricon's daily album chart, however quickly slipped to the lower end of the top 50 during the week of release. It debuted at #44 on the weekly charts, selling 3,100 copies. The album charted for a further two weeks at #161 and #241 respectively, selling a further 1,000 copies in this time.

Critically, CDJournal described the album as "a work made with all her might, that records her feelings (on life, death, Tunisia, etc) just as they were, with real melodies."

== Track listing ==
All songs written and produced by Kokia.

No.	Title	Arranger(s)	Length
1.	"Birth"	Kiyohide Ura	3:43
2.	"Road to Glory: For Dragon Nest"	Masumi Itou	5:18
3.	"U-Cha-Cha"	Yasuhisa Yamamoto	4:42
4.	"Real World"	Yamamoto	4:19
5.	"Saishū Jōei (最終上映, Last Show)"	Yamamoto	4:45
6.	"Love Is Us, Love Is Earth"	Ura	5:21
7.	"Dugong no Sora (ジュゴンの空, Dugong Sky)"	Itou	7:19
8.	"Kodoku na Ikimono (孤独な生きもの, Lonely Living Things)"	Ura	5:20
9.	"Single Mother"	Ura	6:21
10.	"Kimi o Sagashite (君をさがして, I Look for You)"	Ura	5:18
11.	"Oto no Tabibito (音の旅人, Sound Traveller)"	Itou	5:04
12.	"Watashi ga Mita Mono (私が見たもの, Things I Saw)"	Kei Haneoka	5:27
13.	"Kono Chikyū ga Marui Okage de (この地球がまるいお陰で, Thanks to This Earth for Being Round)"	Haneoka	4:38
14.	"The Woman"	Ura	4:53

== Japan Sales Rankings ==
Release	Chart	Peak position	First week sales	Sales total
March 31, 2010	Oricon Daily Albums Chart	14		
March 31, 2010	Oricon Weekly Albums Chart	44	3,100	4,300

== Personnel ==
- Shigeo Fuchino – soprano saxophone
- Kei Haneoka – arranger, programming (#12–13)
- Yuya Haraguchi – acoustic guitar (#3), additional arrangement (#4), guitars (#4),
- Shigeyuki Hirano – director (anco & co.)
- Atsushi Kawahata – electric piano (#4)
- Hiroshi Kawasaki – mastering engineer (at Flair)
- Mikio Koike – visual co-ordination (Victor)
- Kokia – chorus arrangement, design, make-up, producer, songwriter, styling, vocals
- Sae Konno – piano (#12)
- Masahiro Kuniyoshi – download sales (Victor)
- Masumi Ito – arrangement/programming (#2, #7, #11)
- Syuichi Matsuura – publicist (Victor)
- Tsuyoshi Miyagawa – drums (#6, #8)
- Susumu Miyake – cello (#12)
- Yutaka Nakamura – photographer
- Kenji Nozaki – package sales (Victor)
- Mio Okamura Quartet – strings (#1)

"Kodoku na Ikimono"
The lead single before the album. "Kodoku na Ikimono" featured humanitarian lyrics present in Kokia's Life Trilogy songs.

"The Woman"
Written as a central song that defined the album, "The Woman" had a music video shot for it.

- Hiroyasu Okada – quena, siku (#3)
- Aki Okiyama – visual co-ordination
- Mitsutaka Saito – electric bass (#6), washtub bass (#8–9)
- Yoshikazu Sasahara – mixing engineer
- Katsuhiko Sato – guitars (#3)
- Shinozaki Strings – strings (#2, #7)
- Jin Sukegawa – A&R (Victor)
- Gen Tanabe – electric guitar (#5)
- Koichiro Tashiro – laúd and bandolin (#11)
- Tetsuro Toyama – acoustic guitar (#6), electric guitar (#14), guitars (#2, #8–9)
- Kiyohide Ura – arrangement/keyboards (#1, #6, #8–10, #14), piano (#13)
- Eri Yaguchi – design support
- Yasuhisa Yamamoto – arrangement/backing track recording (#3–5), percussion (#3–5, #9), programming (#3, #5)
- Kei Yasui – tin whistle (#11)
