= Yomiuri Telecasting Corporation =

Coordinates: 34°41′27.4″N 135°31′54.3″E

JOIX-DTV
- Logo used since 2007

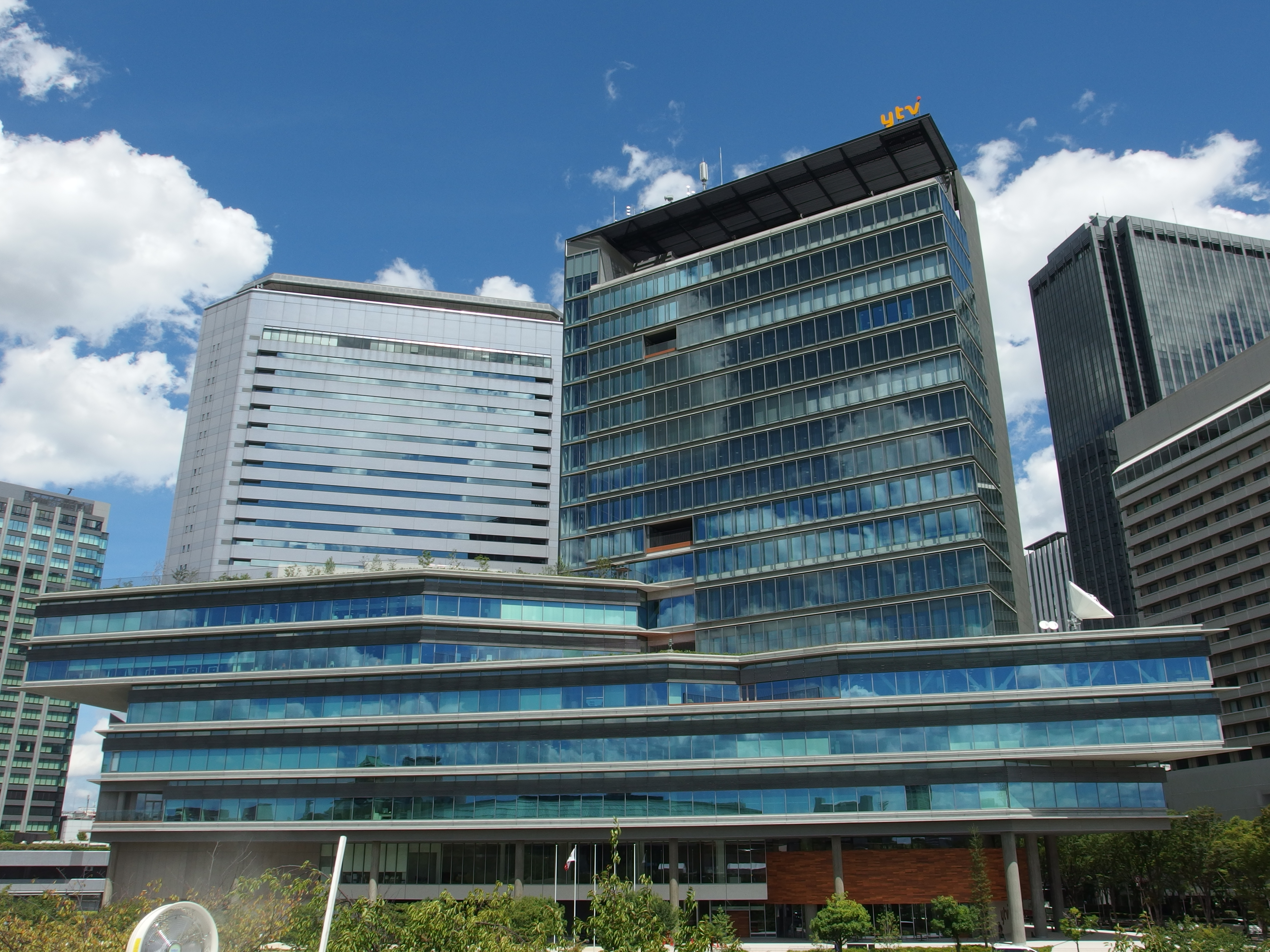
- Headquarters in Chūō-ku, Osaka
- Kansai region; Japan
- City: Osaka
- Channels: Digital: 14 (UHF); Virtual: 10
- Branding: Yomiuri TV ytv

Programming
- Language: Japanese
- Affiliations: Nippon News Network and Nippon Television Network System

Ownership
- Owner: Yomiuri Telecasting Corporation

History
- First air date: August 28, 1958; 68 years ago
- Former call signs: JOIX-TV (1958–2011)
- Former channel numbers: Analog: 10 (VHF, 1958–2011)
- Call sign meaning: Japan; Osaka; Ikoma; X (10, official channel assignment)

Technical information
- Licensing authority: MIC
- ERP: 25 kW

Links
- Website: ytv.co.jp

Corporate information
- Native name: 読売テレビ放送株式会社 (Note: Previously spelled as 讀賣テレビ放送株式会社 from 1958 to 2025.)
- Romanized name: Yomiuri Terebi Hōsō kabushiki gaisha
- Formerly: New Osaka Television Co.
- Type: Subsidiary KK
- Industry: Media
- Founded: 13 February 1958; 68 years ago
- Headquarters: Osaka Business Park, Shiromi, Chūō-ku, Osaka, Japan
- Number of locations: 8 (5 in Japan, 1 in Paris, New York and Shanghai)
- Area served: Worldwide
- Key people: Yozo Matsuda (President)
- Services: Television broadcasting
- Owner: Yomiuri Chukyo FS Broadcasting Holdings
- Subsidiaries: YTE; Yomiuri TV Service, Inc.; ytv Nextry Co., Ltd.; ADEC Co., Ltd.; Sentens Co., Ltd.; Digital Wave Corporation
- Website: ytv.co.jp/corp/

JOIX-DTV (channel 10), branded as Yomiuri TV (読売テレビ, Yomiuri Terebi; YTV (stylized as ytv°)), is the Kansai region flagship station of the Nippon News Network and the Nippon Television Network System, owned by the Yomiuri Telecasting Corporation (読売テレビ放送株式会社, Yomiuri Terebi Hōsō kabushiki gaisha), itself a subsidiary of Yomiuri Chukyo FS Broadcasting Holdings. FYCS is partially controlled by the eponymous Yomiuri Shimbun Holdings, Japan's largest media conglomerate and forms part of Yomiuri's main television broadcasting arm alongside Nippon Television Holdings, the owners of Kantō region flagship Nippon Television, which owns a 20% share in the company. Founded as New Osaka Television Co. on February 13, 1958, and renamed Yomiuri Telecasting Corporation on August 1, the station started broadcasting on August 28 as the first TV station to be affiliated with Nippon Television Network Corporation. Its studios are located in the Osaka Business Park district of Osaka. It also claims the highest viewing ratings in the Kansai region as of 2024.

== History ==
Logo used from 1958 to 2007.

=== Early years ===
Nippon TV applied for TV broadcasting licenses in Osaka and Nagoya after it began broadcasting in 1953, but the Ministry of Post declined the application on the grounds that "Nippon TV is a Tokyo channel, and applying for licenses in other regions is an act of crossing the boundary." At the time, Osaka had only one privately owned television station, Osaka TV Broadcasting (later merged with Asahi Broadcasting). However, because the majority of its programming mostly came from KRT (now TBS), Nippon Television and its parent company, Yomiuri Shimbun Group, began to try to establish their own television station in Osaka. Yomiuri Shimbun filed for a broadcasting license as Shin-Osaka TV in November 1956. In addition to Yomiuri Shimbun, eight other newspapers, including those from Asahi, Mainichi, Sankei, Kobe, and Kyoto, applied for TV broadcasting licenses in the Kansai region at the time, and only two licenses were issued, indicating that rivalry was fierce.

To ease the overheated competition, the Ministry of Post decided to grant an additional broadcasting license in the Osaka area, and on October 22, 1957, the new Osaka TV station was granted a broadcasting license. On August 1, 1958, Shin-Osaka TV changed its name to Yomiuri TV.

=== 1958–1988 ===
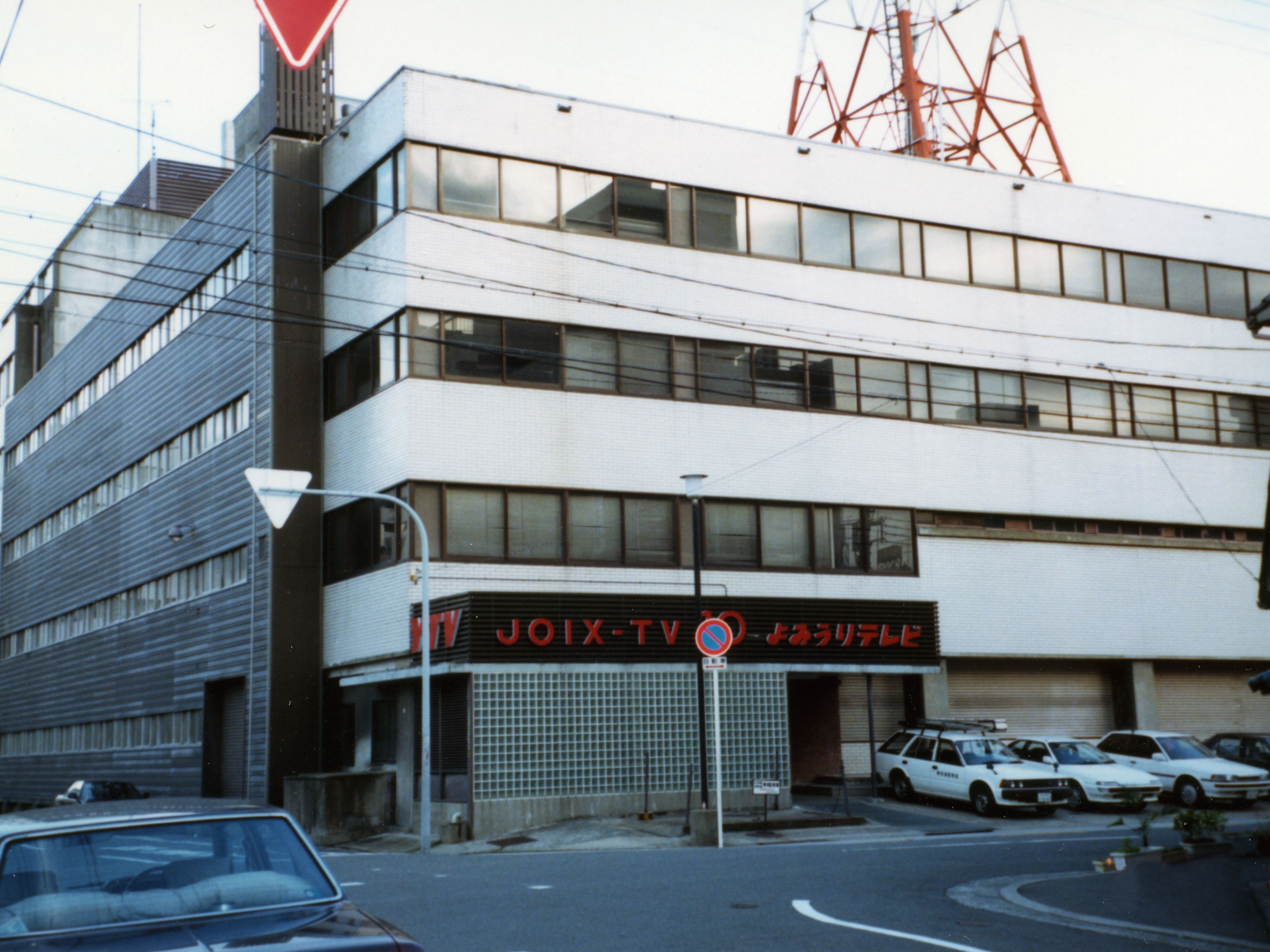
Former headquarters in Higashi-Tenma, Osaka, used from 1958 to 1988.

At 9:00 a.m. (JST) on August 28, 1958, Yomiuri TV was launched as the second privately owned television station in Osaka. Since Yomiuri TV is licensed as a quasi-educational station, they are required to dedicate 20%-30% of its airtime to educational programming, which resulted in being the only broadcaster at that time to air educational programs the most. At that time, Yomiuri TV produced "The Tales of Genji" which received positive reviews. Yomiuri TV started broadcasting color TV programming in September 1960, making it the first TV station in the Kansai region to do so. In April 1968, 30% of daytime and 45% of evening programs were broadcast in color. When Yomiuri TV renewed its broadcast license in 1965, the license category was changed from quasi-educational to general programming, which meant that a greater percentage of entertainment programming could be broadcast. In Spring of 1970, 100% of Yomiuri TV's programming were broadcast in color.

Yomiuri TV's ratings gradually rose after the 1970s, and by the third week of November 1973, Yomiuri TV's daily average rating had reached 10%, and its prime time rating had reached 18.2%, making it the top-rated station in Osaka, including NHK. Since 1977, Yomiuri TV is the official sponsor along with Japan Aviation Association for the Japan International Birdman Rally, which received positive responses. On October 1, 1978 and December 2, 1985, the broadcaster started broadcasting in stereo audio (being the first among Nippon TV affiliates, and second in the world) and supported Teletext (being the first among commercial broadcasters serving the Kansai region), respectively.

=== 1988–present ===
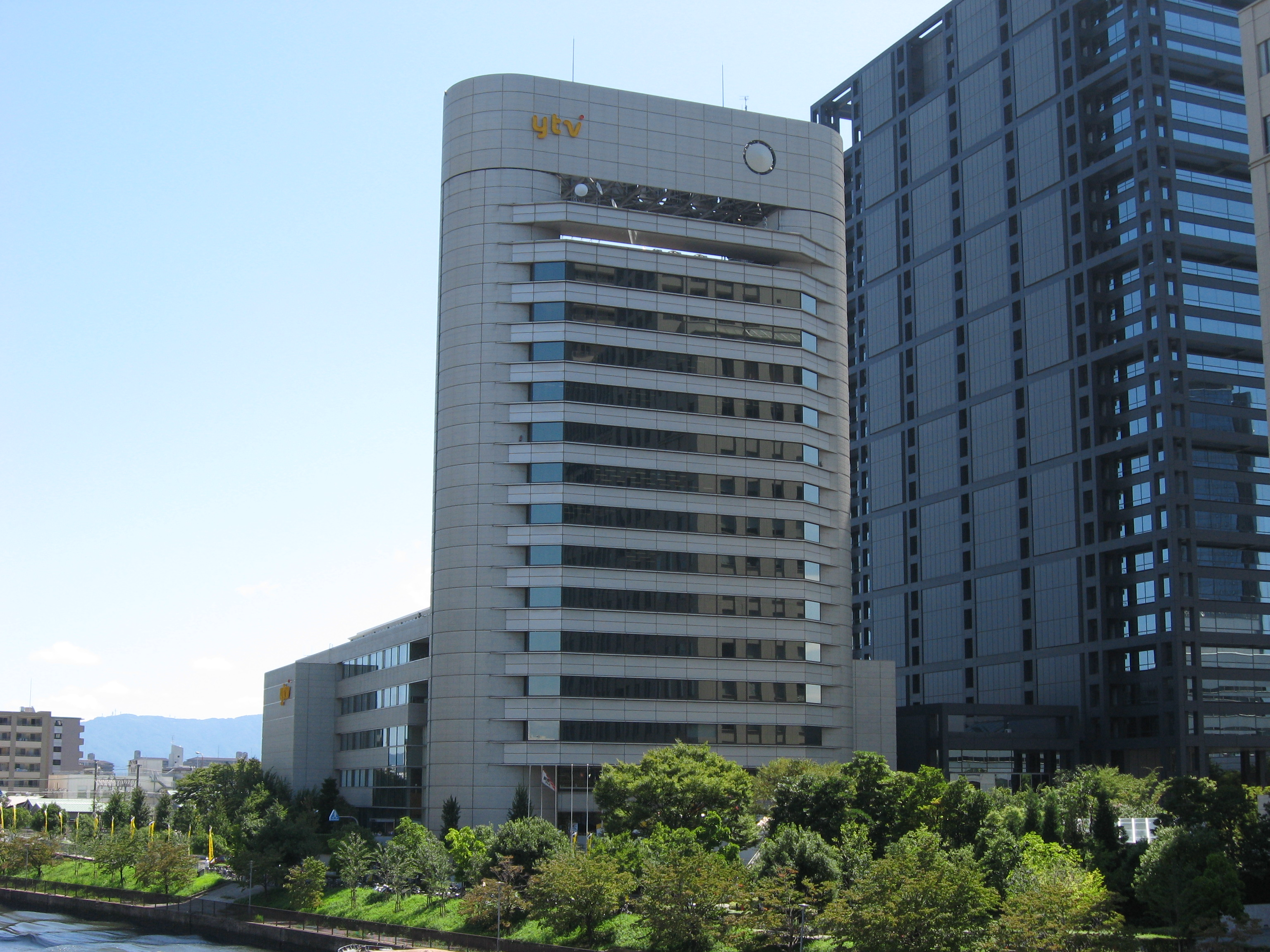
Former headquarters (YTV Kyobashi Building) in Chūō-ku, Osaka used from 1988 to 2019.

On August 1, 1988, Yomiuri TV moved from its headquarters in Higashi-Tenma (since its inception) to Osaka Business Park. In April 1989, the channel started broadcast in enhanced-definition television. The channel ceased analog broadcasting on July 24, 2011.

On March 21, 2024, Yomiuri TV launched YTV Animation, a new production brand that will leverage the broadcaster's long history in animation.

On November 29, 2024, Yomiuri TV alongside fellow NNN/NNS affiliates Chukyo TV, The Sapporo Television Broadcasting and Fukuoka Broadcasting System announced that it would combine and integrate its management operations to form a holding company known as Yomiuri Chukyo FS Broadcasting Holdings Corp (FYCS Holdings). with its offices being located at NTVHD's headquarters in Minato, Tokyo. The merger, classified as a joint-stock transfer is expected to close on April 1, 2025. The merger received approval from the Ministry of Internal Affairs and Communications on March 11, 2025. Unlike a full restructuring of either YTV, CTV, STV and FBS, all four broadcasters would become wholly owned subsidiaries of the combined company with its operations, including its corporate functions, remaining intact. The merger was approved by the shareholders of all four broadcasters, including YTV on December 24 of that year. Following the merger, Yomiuri TV changed its Japanese corporate name spelling to match with the brand name, although the English name remains the same.

== Branding ==
From its inception to 1988, Yomiuri TV simply used the name of the channel with Yomiuri in hiragana (よみうりテレビ) or the YTV initials. During that period the sign-on of the station was footage of the sun rising accompanied by an orchestral fanfare. After the relocation, a new logo featuring a 10 mark was added.

In line with the 50th anniversary of its founding, YTV adopted a new logo, featuring a yellow lowercase ytv wordmark with a ball (the Ten Ball) representing channel 10 (analog and digital).

== See also ==
- Television in Japan
