= Koramgame =

International software developer

- Industry: Software Programming/Publishing
- Founded: March 2008; 18 years ago
- Headquarters: Hong Kong
- Website: koramgame.com/en/

Kunlun Group or their alternative name KoramGame, is a Hong Kong software developer and publisher.

== Description ==
The company was started in March 2008. In 2010, the first game was launched in Malaysia, and the first Bahasa web game in Indonesia. Their China subsidiary specializes in development for browser-based, PC, iOS, and Android games. The primary distribution method of their games is software distribution. Their games were translated into English, French, Spanish, German, Japanese, and Chinese.

Most of KoramGame's published game titles are freemium, with the core game free to download and play; special characters, new abilities and bonuses are awarded through "Kcoins”, which are purchased with real-world currency.

== Games ==
- Three Kingdoms (2009) – ChinaJoy Browser Game of the Year in 2009.
- Kungfu Online (2009) – DigiChina Outstanding Browser Game of the Year in 2009.
- Indomitus – Massively Multiplayer Online Real-Time Strategy game, or MMORTS, of barbarian tribes fighting against other tribes and legions of Roman soldiers.
- Seal: New World – "Rascal Rabbits" face off in a 3D MMO world.
- Angry Birds: Ace Fighter (2016) – an airplane shooter game in which Koramgame teamed up with Rovio. The company announced the game's cancelation on September 6, 2016. Later, on October 8 that year, servers were permanently shut down.
- Wartune – a 2D MMORPG strategy/RPG hybrid game featuring thousand-player boss battles, a guild system, and farming.
- Arcadia – a 3D MMO set in a bizarre fantasy world.
- Rift Hunter – a space fantasy where players must seal rifts to save a kingdom.
- Steel Avengers – an interactive MMO strategy tank game.
- Everlight – a browser-based MMORPG set in a fantasy world of myths, legends, and lost civilizations, including legends of Atlantis, Greek mythology, and the ancient Mayans.
- Call of Gods – an interactive RPG where players choose from one of three races – human, elves, and undead - to conquer the landscape by building castles and exploring dungeons; followed by NPC heroes who learn from their fighting styles.
- Goddess: Primal Chaos (2016) – an interactive RPG in which players travel back through time to save humanity and the spirit world.
- Heroes of Chaos (2012) – an MMORPG similar in style to World of Warcraft and League of Legends. Players choose Warriors, Summoners, or Bloodline and battle to gain supremacy for their guild.
- League of Angels – an MMORPG browser-based game with fantasy kingdoms, and angelic themes.
- Dynasty Saga – a web-based game with both city-building and troop combat, set in Dynastic China.
- Mythopolis - a Facebook MMO set in the time of ancient myths, where players fight for Troy, Sparta or Athens and trade resources with other players to build the best city.
- Dragon Legion – a multiplayer online card battle game where players collect and summon an army of mythical heroes and beasts.
- King of Kung Fu (2015) – a martial arts mobile game, similar to Street Fighter.
- CEO Dream – a now-defunct Facebook game, which allowed players to step into the shoes of a CEO.
- Sword of Chaos – an interactive MMORPG with varied gameplay including tower defense, world bosses, arenas, and 20 vs 20 PVP battles. Players are angels, learning magic skills to defeat armies of fierce creatures; their wings change as they level up.
- Spirit Tales – a fantasy, chibi-style MMO. Servers were shut down in 2015.
- Dragon Born – a real-time strategy MMORPG quest through dungeons; players are Humans stuck in the middle of a war between Dragons and Demons.
- Serenia Fantasy – a browser-based, 2D combat MMORPG. The pixel art and animations are styled like 1990s-era RPGs. Players can turn into different kinds of monsters, can collect over 200 “Spirits”, and use a number of gameplay modes.
- Clash of Kingdoms (Chinese: 千军破) a real-time strategy MMORPG Adobe Flash game based on the Three Kingdoms era of Chinese history.
- Chronicles of Merlin – an interactive MMORPG set in the conquest of medieval England, as depicted in the legends of King Arthur. Players build armies and train heroes to battle the computer or other players.
- Dragon Nest M Global – a mobile adaptation of MMO Dragon Nest, which was released to the North American market in June 2018.
