= Eyedentity Games =

South Korean video game developer

- Type: Subsidiary of Shanda Games
- Industry: Video game development
- Founded: 2007; 19 years ago
- Headquarters: Seoul, South Korea
- Products: Dragon Nest
- Parent: Shanda Games
- Website: www.eyedentitygames.com

Eyedentity Games, Inc. is a South Korean developer of online games founded in 2007. The studio's first game was MMORPG, Dragon Nest. Eyedentity Games was acquired by Chinese digital entertainment company Shanda Games in September 2010.

The studio also released a Diablo-like Chibi-Styled action MMORPG in 2012, titled Dungeon Strikers following Dragon Nest's success. The game is currently in Open-Beta in Korea and rights have sold to Game Flier for distribution in Taiwan, Hong Kong and Macau.

== History ==
In 2010, Shanda Games acquired Eyedentity Games at US$100,000,000. In April 2018, Eyedentity Games executives were arrested for withholding overtime payment.

== Works ==
Year	Title	Platform(s)	Publisher(s)	Ref.
2010	Dragon Nest	Microsoft Windows	Nexon	
2013	New Dungeon Striker	Microsoft Windows	Hangame, ActozSoft	
