= Dragon Friends =

2013 social networking video game

- Developer: InnoSpark
- Publisher: NHN
- Platforms: iOS, Android
- Release: 2013
- Genre: Social network game

Dragon Friends was a 2013 mobile game developed by InnoSpark and published by NHN, companies based in Seoul, South Korea. The game was released for Android and iOS platforms on 2013, and serviced through NHN platform. The game is currently discontinued.

== Game Contents ==
Dragon Friends is a farming game in which players plant crops, and nurture characters to develop their towns and earn diverse characters. Dragons are the main characters of the game, and users can breed, nurture, and evolve Dragons and other characters.

=== Characters ===
==== Dragons ====
Dragons, the main character of Dragon Friends are the most important contents of the game and are divided into 7 basic characteristics. By breeding different types, players can get new types of Dragons: "Tree", "Land", "Fire", "Lightning", "Ice", "Wind", and "Water". These 7 characteristics are also divided into 4 levels.

==== Animals ====
Sheep, Puppies, Cats, Cows, Pigs, and Donkeys are animal characters that help users earn money for the gameplay.

==== Special Characters ====
Due to a cross promotion with Sanrio, there are special characters in Dragon Friends, including Hello Kitty, My Melody, Kuromi, and Cinnamoroll. These characters were first released through the special event.

== Development and release ==
Dragon Friends was released in 2013 for the iOS and Android. It was developed by InnoSpark, a company founded by former developers of Rule the Sky.
