= Nacho Libre (soundtrack) =

Nacho Libre (Music from The Motion Picture)

Soundtrack album by Danny Elfman
- Released: June 16, 2006
- Length: 45:25
- Label: Paramount Music

Danny Elfman chronology
Tim Burton's Corpse Bride (2005)	Nacho Libre (Music from The Motion Picture) (2006)	Charlotte's Web (2006)

Nacho Libre (Music From The Motion Picture) is the soundtrack for the 2006 film of the same name. It was composed by Danny Elfman, and was released in October 2006.

== Background ==
Jared Hess originally wanted musical artist Beck to be behind the soundtrack for the film. Beck, being a fan of Hess, accepted. However, Paramount Pictures did not think Beck's style fit the movie, so composer Danny Elfman was brought in to replace him. Elfman then wrote a full score and recorded it in May 2006. However, only about 2/3 of Elfman's score ended up in the movie (with one of the songs, Ramses Suite, appearing in the released soundtrack). Due to how much of Elfman's music filled the film, Elfman's representatives asked that Elfman be the only person credited for the film's score.

Hess caught wind of this and would not allow the studio to remove Beck from the credits. When finding that he would not have the only music credit, Elfman told Paramount to remove his name from the film. An agreement was eventually reached where both Beck and Elfman were credited for their respective parts of the score. However, Elfman appears with sole credit in the official billing block on promotional material.

== Track listing ==
The track listing for the official soundtrack to Nacho Libre. The soundtrack was released on October 24, 2006. The theme song for the Japanese version is called "Go! Go! Carlito" by Jonny Jakobsen.

No.	Title	Artist	Length
1.	"Hombre Religioso (Religious Man)"	Mister Loco	4:41
2.	"A Nice Pile-Drive to the Face (Dialogue)"	Jack Black	0:18
3.	"Move, Move, Move"	Alan Hawkshaw and Alan Parker	2:50
4.	"Papas"	Mister Loco	4:07
5.	"Piel Canela (Singing at the Party)"	Jack Black with Ismael Garcia Ruiz y Su Trio	1:25
6.	"Ramses Suite"	Danny Elfman	3:09
7.	"All the Orphans in the World (Dialogue)"	Jack Black and Héctor Jiménez	0:16
8.	"There is No Place in This World for Me"	Beck	1:44
9.	"I'm Serious (Dialogue)"	Jack Black	0:27
10.	"10,000 Pesos"	Beck	1:59
11.	"Irene"	Caetano Veloso	3:47
12.	"Pump a Jam (Ramses)"	Cholotronic	1:27
13.	"Black is Black"	Eddie Santiago	4:51
14.	"Half Forgotten Daydreams"	John Cameron	4:05
15.	"Encarnación"	Jack Black	1:19
16.	"Tender Beasts of the Spangled Night"	Beck	1:52
17.	"Saint Behind the Glass"	Los Lobos	3:17
18.	"Beneath the Clothes We Find the Man... (Dialogue)"	Jack Black	0:16
19.	"Forbidden Nectar"	Jack Black and Mucho Macho Acapulco	3:35

Some songs that were not included on the soundtrack, but were in the movie, are "Mucha Muchacha" by Esquivel, "Bubblegum" and "Mr. Loco" by Mister Loco, "Holy Man" by Beck, "Bat Macumba" by Os Mutantes, and "La Llorona Loca" by Little Joe and the Latinaires.
