= InnoSpark =

Korean mobile game company

- Type: Private
- Industry: Mobile games
- Founded: 2012; 14 years ago
- Defunct: November 2017
- Headquarters: Seoul, South Korea
- Key people: JaeChan Shin (Founder and CEO)
- Products: Full list
- Website: innospark.com

InnoSpark Inc (Korean: 이노스파크) was a mobile game development company founded in April 2012 by key members of the team who created Rule the Sky, published by JCE. The company's debut game was Dragon Friends, originally serviced by NHN. From February 27, 2015, InnoSpark started directly servicing Dragon Friends in South Korea and 175 other countries. It also released Hero Sky: Epic Guild Wars.

In June 2015, InnoSpark raised $6.5 million in a Series B funding round. The funding round was led by venture capital firm Keynote Ventures, SL Investment and Company K Partners. InnoSpark was expected to use the funding to continue developing games and enter the Chinese market. The company was absorbed into PUBG Labs after acquisition and closed down in November 2017.

== Games ==
- Dragon Friends: Green Witch (2013) is a social farming game centered on breeding and collecting different cute dragons. It is currently available on iOS, Android, Kindle, Windows and Facebook.
- Hero Sky:Epic Guild Wars (2014) (kor. 히어로스카이) is a strategic game somewhat similar to Clash of Clans, but with an additional complex Hero System. It reached 3 000 000 downloads in 2015. It is available on iOS, Android, Windows and Facebook.

== History ==
=== 2016 ===
- Publishing contract for "Trendy Town" signed on October 20.

=== 2015 ===
- July 8 – Hero Sky: Epic Guild Wars re-opening service in Korea
- June – $6.5m in a Series B funding round
- March 19 – Hero Sky: Epic Guild Wars Global Launching in 154 countries
- February 27 – Starting Global Service of Dragon Friends

=== 2014 ===
- August 8 – Hero Sky (kor. 히어로스카이) launching in Korea (with Nexon)

=== 2013 ===
- December – Dragon Friends Awarded Best New Entry in Korean Apple Appstore 2013
- August 22 – Dragon Friends Launching (with NHN)
- March – ₩2 billion investment.

=== 2012 ===
- June – partnership with NHN
- April 19 – company foundation day.

== Links ==
- Official website
