= Mike Johnson (animator) =

American animator and film director

Mike Johnson is an American stop-motion animator.

== Career ==
Johnson has worked on films such as James and the Giant Peach and The Nightmare Before Christmas, short films such as an animation of "The Devil Went Down to Georgia" (used by Primus and Rednex for promotional videos for their covers of the song), and TV programmes such as The PJs. He is best known for directing Corpse Bride with Tim Burton; they were nominated for the 2005 Academy Award for Best Animated Feature. In May 2006, Johnson was set to direct the animated film The Tale of Despereaux (2008), before he was replaced by Sam Fell and Rob Stevenhagen. In 2010, Johnson was also attached to direct Oz Wars, a CGI/stop-motion hybrid film. He directed Ping Pong Rabbit, from a script by Peter Barsocchini. The film was released by Mili Pictures Worldwide in 2017 in Turkey and 2019 in the United States.

In 1996, he set up his own animation company, Fat Cactus Films. Johnson attended the Rhode Island School of Design, where he majored in Film/Animation/Video. He currently teaches stop-motion at the California Institute of the Arts and University of California Los Angeles.
