= Rift Hunter =

2013 video game

- Developer: Yinhan
- Publishers: Kingnet Technology; Koramgame
- Platforms: iOS, Android
- Release: GER: July 11, 2013; UK: August 2013; NA: August 2013
- Genre: Beat 'em up
- Mode: Multiplayer online

Rift Hunter is a multiplayer online iOS and Android based beat 'em up video game developed by Chinese studio Yinhan, and currently published by Kingnet Technology in Europe and Koramgame in North America. The game has a space fantasy theme, includes single-player and co-op dungeons, as well as player-versus-player modes. Characters slay monsters to ultimately seal the rifts which have been plaguing their land.

== Gameplay ==
Rift Hunter features cooperative gameplay as well as competitive PVP, many single-player dungeons, and an advanced guild system.

=== Class skills ===
At present, each in-game class can learn 10 distinct skills and activate 3 of them at the same time.

Werewolf Skills: Shadow Slash: It can be used to entangle a dungeon boss or escape from a rival's combo attack during PK combat. Fists of Fury: A good skill to launch combo attacks. Slam Fist: Werewolf is a melee class, which can bring its power into full play when it is close to an enemy. Slam Fist is a skill tailor-made to meet the Werewolf's strengths. Sonic Boom: It can cause considerable damage and is a good skill for use in challenging dungeons. It can be used along with Slam Fist.

Siren Skills: Fire Pillar: It can cause considerable damage when in dungeons and for PK combat. Meteor Strike: When a boss launches a full screen attack, Sirens can cast this skill from far away. Siren's Shield: Increases the Sirens' agility and ability to escape. It is a good skill for use in PK combat. Epic Spring: An ultimate kill skill in PK combat, but it consumes considerable SP.

Gunner Skills: Air Support: An AOE skill is most effective in dungeons where there are many monsters, but not in PK combat. Gun Sabre: A melee skill with long range and can be cast quickly with low SP consumption. Meteor Shower: Inflicts incredible damage, but needs time to accumulate power. Bombard: More powerful than Air Support, the skill is especially suitable for PVP combat.

=== Dungeon Quests ===
Rift Hunter allows players to challenge hundreds of dungeons. Each of these large areas also includes several smaller dungeons while each dungeon consists of a number of different levels. Players must defeat the final boss to complete the dungeon.

Stamina points are consumed when challenging a dungeon. The system will give away 300 Stamina points to players each day. Players can also receive extra Stamina points from other methods.

After players have eliminated all the monsters in a level, a prompt "Go" and an arrow will appear. Players can enter the next level according to the guide. They need to pass through all levels of a dungeon to challenge the final boss.

The system will rate players' performance after they defeat the final boss, including completion time, lethality, Combo Attacks used and Exp received. Players have a chance to receive up to 7 stars.

After that, players have a chance to receive various in-game items as rewards from drawing cards. They can draw free cards or consume Gold or Crystals to draw more cards.

=== Equipment ===
The in-game equipment of all classes can be divided into Common, Rare, Epic and Legendary based on colors. The equipment is further separated into 4 kinds of quality, which include Grade D, C, B and A. The equipment also possesses attributes which include ATK, DEX, DEF, CRT, WILL and AGI.

Werewolves use a Blade, Sirens use a Relic, and Gunners use a Gun. Other than weapons, all three in-game classes share clothes, leggings, necklaces, belts and shoes.

Equipment's attributes are fixed. All in-game equipment can be enhanced. Each time players successfully enhance a piece of equipment, it will receive different attribute points. The success rate to enhance equipment is not 100% and failure is possible, but the target equipment won't disappear even though players fail to enhance it.

Players may receive different equipment from different dungeons. They have a chance to earn better equipment from more difficult dungeons. They may also receive equipment from drawing cards after they complete the dungeons.

=== Game system ===
Character Status: Character's equipment, power, fortune, titles, privileges and other basic information will be found through character status.

Battle Dungeons: Players participate in battles to challenge and clear the following in-game dungeons:

Storyline Dungeons: The main in-game dungeons, from which players can level up, receive equipment and start the storyline. They are divided into Normal, Hard and Nightmare modes.

Challenge Dungeons: Gives players a chance to enhance powers, with various challenge quests and a variety of rewards. They are more difficult than Bounty, Entertainment or Storyline Dungeons.

Bounty Dungeons: The system will automatically refresh Bounty Dungeons, which are integrated into the Storyline Dungeons each day. It is an important way to receive Crystals. The difficulty degree is medium.

Entertainment Dungeons: Relatively easy challenges offered by the "Carnival".

Equipment System: In-game equipment includes Weapon, Clothes, Leggings, Shoes, Belt and Necklace, with a legendary suit available every 10 levels. Equipment power is measured by Stars; players can enhance equipment and increase its Star level.

Skill System: Each of the 3 available classes possesses 11 skills, including 3 natural skills and 8 locked skills. The "Awakening" skill, unlocked on level 61, is the most powerful in terms of AOE and damage.

Arena System: The in-game Arena system includes Arena Brawl, Ladder Match and the PK Room.

Arena Brawl: The system will randomly matches online rivals.

Ladder Match: PK with an offline player operated by the system.

PK Room: Player can select a rival and PK in an exclusive room. The system will rank all participating players according to their scores and give away titles of different stages.

Guild System: All guild members can construct various facilities together to enhance their power or challenge Guild Dungeons. The Guild War decides in-game guilds' abilities. During the Guild War, all qualified guilds will PK with each other to compete for the final victory and rewards. The top 3 guilds will be awarded with the title of "First Place", "Second Place" and "Third Place".

Social System: It includes Friend, World Chat, Whisper, Team, Trade and Auction.

Event Function: Players can find suitable in-game events depending on the character's level and power.

Ranking System: In-game rankings include Crystal Ranking, Power Ranking, Level Ranking and Arena Ranking. The top 20 players of each ranking will be listed.

Shop System: To guarantee game fairness, players can only buy ordinary items from the Shops, such as support items for leveling up and basic equipment below level 40.

Charge System: Charges player's account. The system also includes a Charge Ranking which gives away rewards to players according to the ranking.

== Background story ==
Adala was once the "paradise of the universe", a quiet, beautiful, and vastly prosperous land. In 893 of the Creation Calendar, the powerful but evil Sirens started the "Genesis Project", attempting to create the most powerful and perfect life form in the world. In order to prevent the situation from getting out of hand, Adala formed an alliance, which destroyed everything the Sirens had possessed and expelled the remnants. The war however tore a mysterious accidental rift in space, from which powerful demons emerged continuously. The rift also corroded the nearby forests, which mutated woodland creatures into horrible and cruel beasts. More and more powerful monsters came into existence, with the most advanced able to rip through thousands of warriors instantly. After an emergency conference, Adala decided to assemble the elites of all races and form an organization to especially hunt those beasts. They are called the "Rift Hunters".
