= Tim Burton's Corpse Bride (soundtrack) =

2005 film soundtrack album

Film score by Danny Elfman
- Released: September 20, 2005
- Recorded: 2005
- Studios: Abbey Road Studios in London, England
- Genre: Soundtrack
- Length: 59:42
- Label: Warner Records
- Producer: Danny Elfman

Danny Elfman chronology
Charlie and the Chocolate Factory (2005)	Tim Burton's Corpse Bride (2005)	Serenada Schizophrana (2006)

Singles from Tim Burton's Corpse Bride
- 1. "Remains of the Day" Released: 2005

Tim Burton's Corpse Bride (Original Motion Picture Soundtrack) is the soundtrack album composed by Danny Elfman for the film of the same name and released by Warner Records on September 20, 2005.

== Development and release ==
Danny Elfman composed the Corpse Bride soundtrack simultaneously alongside the score for Charlie and the Chocolate Factory (2005). The soundtrack was released on September 20, 2005. It contains all of the music from the film including score music and four songs with lyrics sung by voice actors. In the United Kingdom, the album peaked at number 13 on the Soundtrack Albums Chart on 30 October 2005, spending a total of five weeks on that chart.

== Track listing ==
All tracks are written by Danny Elfman.

No.	Title	Performer(s)	Length
1.	"Main Title" (Score)	Elfman	2:05
2.	"According to Plan"	Albert Finney, Joanna Lumley, Tracey Ullman, Paul Whitehouse	3:44
3.	"Victor's Piano Solo" (Score)	Elfman	1:17
4.	"Into the Forest" (Score)	Elfman	4:34
5.	"Remains of the Day"	Elfman, Jane Horrocks, Paul Baker, Alison Jiear, Gary Martin	3:26
6.	"Casting a Spell" (Score)	Elfman	1:25
7.	"Moon Dance" (Score)	Elfman	1:27
8.	"Victor's Deception" (Score)	Elfman	3:59
9.	"Tears to Shed"	Helena Bonham Carter, Horrocks, Enn Reitel	2:45
10.	"Victoria's Escape" (Score)	Elfman	2:30
11.	"The Piano Duet" (Score)	Elfman	1:53
12.	"New Arrival" (Score)	Elfman	0:41
13.	"Victoria's Wedding" (Score)	Elfman	3:14
14.	"The Wedding Song"	Elfman, Horrocks, Baker, Jiear, Martin	3:00
15.	"The Party Arrives" (Score)	Elfman	3:20
16.	"Victor's Wedding" (Score)	Elfman	2:08
17.	"Barkis's Bummer" (Score)	Elfman	2:07
18.	"The Finale" (Score)	Elfman	2:35
19.	"End Credits" (Part 1) (Score)	Elfman	1:49
20.	"End Credits" (Part 2) (Score)	Elfman	2:32

Bonus Tracks from Bonejangles and his Bone Boys
No.	Title	Performer(s)	Length
21.	"Ball & Socket Lounge Music #1" (Band Version) (Score)	Elfman	2:15
22.	"Remains of the Day" (Combo Lounge Version) (Score)	Elfman	3:06
23.	"Ball & Socket Lounge Music #2" (Score)	Elfman	1:10
24.	"Ball & Socket Lounge Music #1" (Combo Version) (Score)	Elfman	2:14
Total length:			59:42

== Charts ==
Chart performance for Corpse Bride OST
Chart (2005)	Peak position
UK Soundtrack Albums (Official Charts)	13

== Reception ==
Kirk Honeycutt of The Hollywood Reporter gave praise to the soundtrack, specifically the "inspired songs".

== Awards and nominations ==
Awards and nominations
Award	Year	Category	Result	Ref(s)
Satellite Awards	2005	Best Original Score	Nominated	
