= Dragon Nest: Warriors' Dawn =

- Theatrical release poster
- Directed by: Song Yuefeng
- Screenplay by: Bill Borden; Yuefeng Song; Yuefeng Zhong; Ran Zhuo
- Story by: Terry Izumi; Ran Zhuo
- Based on: Dragon Nest
- Produced by: Bill Borden; Jack Zhang; Michael Yijun Wang
- Starring: Hu Ge; Jing Tian; Xu Jiao; Xia Zitong
- Music by: Adrian Lee
- Production company: Mili Pictures
- Distributed by: Huaxia Film Distribution (China); Universal Pictures (international)
- Release date: July 31, 2014 (China)
- Running time: 88 minutes
- Country: China
- Languages: Mandarin; English
- Budget: US$22 million
- Box office: US$9.8 million (China)

Dragon Nest: Warriors' Dawn (Chinese: 龙之谷：破晓奇兵) is a 2014 Chinese animated fantasy-romance-adventure film directed by Song Yuefeng and based on the Dragon Nest video game.

== Plot ==
The film takes place fifty years before the game. Alteria is a land divided among humans, elves, goblinoids (called "beasts"), and dragons. Decades ago, the elves and humans drove the beasts and dragons back into the Dark Mountains, but with the beasts vanquished, the humans and elves eventually came into conflict with each other, thereby remaining unaware that evil begins to thrive and gain strength again within the Dark Mountains, all centered on a gem of power embedded in the chest of the sleeping Black Dragon Karas, under whose influence the beasts have united into an army.

A cocky, adventurous human boy named Lambert and his dogs One and Two have a run-in with a large beast band on a raid. Just before they end up killed, they are saved by a trio of famous adventurers: Barnac, a famous mercenary and captain of a flying ship; Geraint, a famous dragon fighter; and Argenta, Geraint's sister. They proceed to the human kingdom of Saint Heaven, to which two Elven maidens, Princess Nerwin and her companion Liya, have secretly travelled to beseech the king for an alliance against the beasts. While trying to get himself a sword, Lambert encounters Liya and ends teaming up with her and his heroic companions against a band of beasts attacking the city, holding them off until the Imperial Knights under Velskud can bring the situation under control. With evidence of the new threat on his literal doorstep, the terrified king finally agrees to the alliance.

While the newly-found allies gather their forces, Liya spots a shadow near the king's dining hall and follows it, accompanied by Lambert. There, they sneak into a meeting between the king, Terramai (his priest and advisor), Karacule (a sorceress), Nerwin, Barnac, Geraint, Argenta, and Velskud discussing the threat of Karas and the gem forming both his base of power and his most vulnerable spot. An argument over who should assume custody of the gem breaks out until Lambert interrupts them with a plan for a combined diversionary attack and infiltration, upon which - although the plan is accepted - he and Liya are kicked out. However, by listening in they learn that the gem's dark power corrupts those of weak heart and will therefore have to be destroyed.

Later that night, Velskud is joined by Princess Elena, a Dark Elf who desires the gem for herself and who is the infiltrator Liya saw earlier. Velskud, seduced by Elena's promises to be made ruler of all Alteria, kills the king before joining the other heroes for the secret mission. Lambert, who also comes along with Liya, receives a sword from an old blacksmith in return for holding onto One and Two until his return. Under the cover of darkness, they travel to the Dark Mountains on Barnac's ship. Lightning strikes the ship, and while Lambert tries to retrieve his sword which has slipped from his hand, he accidentally disables the ship's wheel. The ship crashes, and the group is forced to continue the journey on foot.

Along the way, the companions reach a set of ruins which were the site of a battle between the elves and humans and are still haunted by the ghosts of the fallen elves. Forced to cross them following one of Lambert's mishaps, they are discovered and taunted by a bat scout serving the Black Dragon. When Velskud attacks it, it tries to slip away to the Dark Mountains before the heroes manage to kill it. As the journey continues, Lambert and Liya develop a romantic interest in each other, and Geraint and Argenta are shown to hide a secret connected to the Dragon's gem. Using this link, Geraint finds and unseals a secret entrance to the Dragon's lair in the wall of a glacier, but while traversing the ice ravine beyond the door, they are ambushed by Karas' beast guardians. They escape by collapsing the exit, but Geraint and Argenta stay behind, and Geraint uses the power of the gem in his chest to awaken a giant beast frozen in the ice. They escape and reunite with the others.

The companions do not make it in time before the Alliance begins its attack, causing Karas to awaken. The beasts fighting against the Alliance retreat but run into Lambert's group. In the ensuing confusion, Liya and Lambert are left behind and forced to fight the monsters by themselves. When Lambert is about to get eaten by a beast, Liya uses her last arrow to save him, sacrificing herself. The others hear Lambert's cries of anguish and race to aid him, but are quickly overrun by the beasts. Geraint uses his secret power to transform into a Golden Dragon and save his companions, but accidentally hurts Karacule in the process. It turns out that he and Argenta are Half-Dragons and therefore bearers of Dragon Gems themselves. The others, seeing Geraint's dragon form, start to distrust the siblings, claiming that dragons need to be killed.

Karas appears and attacks, and is immediately engaged by Geraint. As they fly above Lambert, he notices the glowing gem on Karas' chest, and remembering what was said about it - including that it holds the power to raise the dead - he decides to get it for Liya. He jumps onto Karas as he flies past and climbs his way up to the chest. The others join in to dislodge the dark gem, and Argenta transforms into a Silver Dragon to help her brother. By combining their powers, they are eventually able to detach the dark gem from Karas, killing the monster at last.

Lambert demands the gem from Geraint in order to resurrect Liya, but Geraint warns him from touching it, for fear that its power will corrupt him, and instead gives him his own gem. While Lambert runs off to apply the gem on Liya, Velskud seizes Karas' gem, but before he can slay Geraint, Lambert interferes and returns Geraint's gem to its owner. As he and Velskud duel, the dark gem begins to corrupt the knight and transform him into a new Black Dragon. Before the warped knight can kill Lambert, an elven arrow distracts him, allowing Lambert to grab Velskud's own sword and fatally wound his opponent.

The arrow was guided by Liya, who has returned from the brink of death, and she and Lambert embrace each other in a kiss. The Alliance army arrives and picks the heroes up for a ride home, but Elena watches them leave with a dark gem in her hands. Following the end credits, Lambert reunites with his dogs and respectively renames them Bow and Arrow.

== Cast ==
Characters	English cast	Chinese cast
Lambert, the protagonist	Charlie Schlatter	Shen Dawei
Liya	Blythe Auffarth	Xu Jiao
Elena	Carrie-Anne Moss	Huang Ying
Varnak/Barnac	Graham Beckel	Meng Xianglong
Gerrant/Geraint	Lucas Grabeel	Sun Ye
Nerwin	Jessica Tuck	Ji Guanlin
Velskud	D.W. Moffett	Hu Ge
Kasarana/Karacule	Blythe Auffarth	Xia Zitong
Terram/Terramai	Simon Jaglom	Shang Hong
Argenta, the Silver Dragon	Bianca Collins	Jing Tian

== Reception ==
=== Box office ===
The film earned CN¥0.57 billion at the Chinese box office.

== Sequel ==
A sequel, Dragon Nest 2: Throne of Elves, was released in 2016.
