= Remains of the Day (song) =

Song by Danny Elfman

from the album Tim Burton's Corpse Bride soundtrack
- Released: September 20, 2005
- Recorded: 2005
- Genre: Soundtrack, jazz
- Label: Warner Bros.
- Songwriter: Danny Elfman
- Producer: Danny Elfman

"Remains of the Day" is one of the four main songs sung in the 2005 stop-motion animated film Corpse Bride. It was composed by Danny Elfman, along with all other music for the film. The film's soundtrack also replays the song's chorus in the track "End Credits", and features as a bonus track an instrumental version subtitled "Combo Lounge Version".

== Lyrics ==
The song is the second one in the movie, and vital to the plot. The character Bonejangles (voiced by Danny Elfman) introduces the song with the following lyrics: "What a story it is; a tragic tale of romance, passion and a murder most foul." Then, Bonejangles and other skeletons and corpses from the Land of the Dead sing the song with a fast and jazzy melody, and the lyrics explain how Emily, the film's titular character, died.

In the song's storyline, Emily was a beautiful, wealthy, and talented young woman who had many suitors, one of which was a "mysterious stranger," who is later revealed in the film's climax as a murderous con-artist named Lord Barkis Bittern. While Emily admired Barkis for his supposed good personality and physical appearance, her father forbade her to marry him because of his poverty. Barkis manipulated Emily into eloping with him; Emily donned her mother's wedding dress, took her "family jewels and a satchel of gold," and went to the churchyard in the middle of the night to meet him. However, he murdered her, stole her jewels and wealth, and hid her body beneath an oak tree. In death, Emily vowed to remain there until "her true love" comes to "set her free," which Victor inadvertently does while practicing his wedding vows to marry Victoria.

The song's chorus conveys the message of the inevitability of death, encouraging Victor and the listener to have a more congenial attitude towards mortality.

== Composition ==
When composing a song for Bonejangles, who he compared to Sammy Davis Jr. in also being a singer with only one eye, Danny Elfman had in mind a "gruffer singer" that fitted the jazz tune, auditioning over 20 vocalists across New York and Los Angeles and recording with three before Tim Burton asked Elfman himself to perform.
