= Dragon Nest =

Free-to-play fantasy MMORPG developed by Eyedentity

- Dragon Nest logo
- Genre: MMORPG
- Video game
- Developer: Eyedentity Games
- Publisher: KOR: Nexon→Actoz Soft→Pupugame; NA: Nexon→Eyedentity Games; SEA: Cherry Credits→Eyedentity Games; EU: eFusion→Shanda→Cherry Credits
- Genre: MMORPG
- Platform: Microsoft Windows
- Released: KOR: March 2010; NA: September 2011; EU: March 2013
- Manga

Dragon Nest: Shungeki no Sedo
- Written by: Eyedentity Games
- Illustrated by: Tatsubon
- Published by: Kodansha
- Magazine: Monthly Shōnen Rival
- Original run: 4 June 2010 – 4 April 2011
- Volumes: 3

Dragon Nest (Korean: 드래곤네스트) is a free-to-play fantasy MMORPG developed by Eyedentity and available in different regions and languages. Aside from gameplay featuring a non-targeting combat and skill system within instance dungeons, Dragon Nest revolves around a story which is told in different points of view depending on the player's chosen class. Dragon Nest receives new content, balance patches and cash shop items on a monthly basis. Major expansions that include several new dungeons, Nests, new classes, multiple new features or remake of old ones, extensive class adjustments and a raise on the level cap take place every year.

The game has over 200 million players as of 2013, and had grossed ₩200 billion ($180 million) by 2012.

== Gameplay ==
Dragon Nest incorporates non-targeting system gameplay to create a fast-paced action-filled experience. Players choose from a range of hero classes, characters that are of the Dragon Nest storyline that can equip customizable gear and weapons. Characters exist in one world, Kalahan, which resulted from Nexon uniting all four worlds to unite the characters. Devastating skills can also be learned, to increase one's power when defeating monsters in instance dungeons or defeating other players in PvP.

Dragon Nest also has the advantage of being nearly completely skill-based, with lower level characters being able to defeat high level characters in PvP with skill alone. This allows a more experienced player that is of a lower level to dominate a less experienced player of a higher level player in PvP.

In Dragon Nest, players fight groups of monsters using skills and attacks received by class trainers throughout the game. The monsters drop money, boxes, collectables, materials, weapons or equipment that can be used by the player, sold, traded or thrown away.

The Cash Shop is an in-game shop where players use real-life currency to purchase equipment not widely available in-game. Special items can also help in the development of the characters such as Approval Stamps, Protection Jellies, and Dragon Eggs. Player can also buy pets, costumes, cosmetics to personalise their character.

In Dragon Nest NA, the Cash Shop is known as the "Dragon Vault".

== Storyline ==
The Goddess Althea, creator of the land of Alteria (Altea in the NA version, Lagendia in the SEA version), is poisoned by her evil sister Vestinel. The poison can only be cured using an antidote made using the source of the poison itself, Vestinel's magic grail, which has disappeared somewhere within Alteria. The players as heroes of Alteria must comb the land fighting evil dragons in order to find power stones that enable them to communicate with the sleeping goddess in order to find the grail, wake her and save the world.

== Releases ==
=== East Asian release ===
In November 2007, Nexon Korea Corporation secured rights to Dragon Nest and was officially released in Korea in March 2010.

In December 2007, Shanda, game publisher in China, published the Chinese version of Dragon Nest. The Chinese closed beta began on 25 March 2010 with an official release later that year.

NHN Japan published Dragon Nest in Japan on their Hangame JP portal in 2008. In 2010, GACKT became the artist for the "Black Version" of the theme song of the game titled "EVER". NHN Japan subsequently began Dragon Nest Japan's closed beta.

=== North American release ===
In 2009, Nexon America acquired the publishing rights of Dragon Nest for distribution in North America. Originally, Dragon Nest was scheduled for a mid-2010 release, but was delayed to Summer of 2011. Closed beta testing period was 15–20 June. Dragon Nest open beta testing opened on July 26. The game was slated to go live on August 11, but this date was pushed back. The North American version was level-capped at 32 with the Saints Haven release on 28 September. Characters, items and skill from the open beta test were not cleared, so players kept the progress they made in the OBT. In mid-December, the North American version has extended its level-cap to 40, giving the player the ability to learn their 2nd sub-class's final skill. The Tinkerer class was added in the June 2012 patch. The first Dragon class nest, Sea Dragon Nest, has been released on 24 July. On 24 October, the North American version extended its level-cap to 50, giving the players the ability to learn their 3rd sub-class. In June 2013 the level-cap of the North American version was extended to 60, allowing players to learn two EX skills.

=== South East Asian release ===
Shanda and Cherry Credits released the localized version of Dragon Nest for South East Asia region. Closed beta testing period for Dragon Nest SEA ran from 13 to 19 July 2011. Open beta was opened from 16 August to 20 October.

Official release of the game began on 20 October 2011 onwards, with the release of Saint Haven and level 32 cap on 18 October to mark its grand opening. There were four servers at the time of SEA's installation, namely (in chronological order) Westwood, Springwood, Greenwood and Holywood. The English language voiceovers for non-playable characters and the song "The Warrior Call" for this release were produced by Deniss Berezins of Overdrawn Records.

Level cap has been increased to 40 on 13 December the same year. Additional content related to the increase has been added which includes new Level 40 items, Manticore Nest and the Apocalypse Nest. On 24 April 2012, the long anticipated Academic class has been released, bringing the total playable starting characters to 5. The long-awaited Sea Dragon Nest was released on 4 June, and also the much anticipated Level 50 cap was released on 28 August, together with further advancements in their current job classes. On 2 April 2013, the new Kali class was released. On 13 May, the level cap was increased to 60. On 11 February 2014, the level cap was increased to 70, giving access to new EX skills, and the Anu Arendel dungeons. On 18 March the Assassin character was released. The level cap was increased to 80 with new lvl 80 EX skill & equipment in 2015 with new lvl 80 dungeons and nest. The new Lancea class was released on 3 March, bringing a total of 8 playable characters.

=== European release ===
Closed beta began on 27 February 2013. Dragon Nest Europe was officially released on 6 March by eFusion. From 24 to 29 October, Dragon Nest EU had a server transfer and officially changed host to Shanda.

In January 2016, Dragon Nest Europe suffered a massive data loss of all players and the server came back online on 5 February. On 16 March, Dragon Nest Europe changed the publisher to be part of Cherry Credits.

Dragon Nest Europe publisher Cherry Credits began the server closure on 15 May 2019, as the service contract was no longer being extended to Cherry Credits by the developer Eyedentity Games.

=== Russian release ===
Localization in Russian is handled by the holding company Mail.Ru Group. Closed alpha began on 28 August and finished on 5 September 2012. Open beta began on 26 September.

The next update was released on 3 February 2016, featuring Red Dragon Nest (Hardcore), Hero Battlefield (Hardcore) and Argenta's Costume. After this patch, the next update was released on 31 March, featuring Rumble Mode. This patch has been released with bag: characters could up their level, but 90 cap was not released. On 1 April this bag was fixed.

It was the last update on Russian server. Next update should have been 90 cap, but problems became harder. Server had juridical disagreements with developers and also the game became not in priority for the Mail.Ru Group company. All gamers expected update and long time listened promises of the game producer, but 90 cap update had not been released.

The company began the closure of the game servers in 2018.

== Sequel and spin-offs ==
=== Dragon Nest Labyrinth (드래곤네스트:라비린스) ===
Dragon Nest Labyrinth is a top view dungeon crawler for iOS and Android developed by Eyedentity Games, said to take place 500 years after the events of the original Dragon Nest. Players can choose between the Warrior, Archer, Sorceress and Cleric to explore random generated dungeons.

=== Dragon Nest: Awake (龙之谷：Awake) ===
Dragon Nest: Awake, also known as Dragon Nest Mobile, is a hack and slash game for mobile devices for the Chinese market developed in Unity. The game uses various assets from the original Dragon Nest, including the 3D models. Players clear stages to progress through a brand-new story loosely based on the original game, said to be focused on Geraint and Velskud. The game has a hub modeled after Saint Haven for players to interact with one another, manage menus and speak to NPCs like Argenta.

=== Saint Haven: Dragon Nest ===
Saint Haven: Dragon Nest is a mobile game for Android and iOS, and was released globally on 25 April 2017. New system and UI has been implemented such as semi-automatic skill and open field monster, and AI companion in the form of "Heroes". This game is different from Chinese counterpart, Dragon Nest: Awake, as the system is the same on as the original game on PC.

=== Dragon Nest II Legend ===
Dragon Nest II Legend is an action game developed by Eyedentity Games for iOS and Android and was released on 5 August 2017 on App Store. The story takes place 500 years before the events of Dragon Nest but speculated to be an alternate timeline due to incongruencies with the main story: the game's story states that Geraint defeated the Black Dragon, but was exposed to the potion and to prevent corruption he sealed himself. In the process, Geraint lost his memories but eventually meets someone that will help him recover. Geraint's physical appearance also differs: he is portrayed with platinum blonde hair, paler skin and blue eyes.

Players take control of Geraint, Argenta, Marian and Garvel, each with 20 different skills that can be unlocked by progressing in the game.

=== Dragon Nest Origin ===
No details were given of this game, and it is said to be on an early stage of development by Eyedentity Games for iOS and Android. Announcement trailer only played gameplay clips of the original Dragon Nest.

=== Dragon Nest: The Light of Daybreak (龙之谷：破晓) ===
Dragon Nest: The Light of Daybreak, also known as Dragon Nest: Warriors' Dawn, is a side-scroller beat 'em up game for iOS and Android developed by Beijing ZhangKuo Mobile Multimedia Technologie Co., Ltd., based both in the original Dragon Nest game universe and the film Dragon Nest: Warriors' Dawn universe. Players can take control of the Warrior, Archer and Sorceress to progress through stages and meet popular NPCs of the franchise, but Kali and Assassin have been teased in trailers and adverts. It is currently only available for the Chinese market.

=== Dragon Nest: Continenth Exploration (龙之谷大陆探险) ===
Dragon Nest: Continenth Exploration, also known as Dragon Nest Wonderland (新龍之谷大富豪 WONDERLAND) in Taiwan and Hong Kong, was monopoly style game for iOS and Android released in July 2014. The game was only released in China, Taiwan and Hong Kong before shutting down in November the same year. The game interacted with the original Dragon Nest and players could participate in events, collect virtual cards, win items or merchandise through this game.

=== Serencia Saga: Dragon Nest (セレンシアサーガ：ドラゴンネスト) ===
Serencia Saga: Dragon Nest is an action game developed by Primus Inc. a subsidiary company of Gumi, led by a former producer of the PC version of Dragon Nest Japan.

The game featured 4 familiar playable characters at the start: Warrior, Archer, Cleric, and Sorceress. With a brand new storyline, players could travel on the world of Serencia as a "Knight of the Seal Dragon", going through trials set by a goddess. The game could be played in either landscape mode or portrait mode according to the player's preference, switching at any time. The game was launched in Japan in summer 2017, but was later shut down on 28 March the following year.

=== World of Dragon Nest ===
Eyedentity Games released World of Dragon Nest in Summer 2018. The features characters from the original PC version and introduces in new characters. Players face new enemies called "Paradise Exiles". The game has a focus on larger scale combat. The end-game content includes guild wars which involves 60 players, 30 from each side, fighting each other.

World of Dragon Nest was released on the mobile platforms. The game has auto combat, but the players can switch to manual mode anytime they want. It also features the non-targeting combat. In the new game, there is a gauge on the screen and is like an ultra skill system. Making both genders for each class was the other thing the developer team put a lot of resources into. In addition to gender lock removal, World of Dragon Nest completely ditches the class / skill system in Dragon Nest. There is a new class in the game called "Slayer".

== Media ==
=== Manga ===
There is a manga based on the game named Dragon Nest -Shungeki no Sedo- (Dragon Nest-瞬撃のセド-; lit. 'Dragon Nest -Sedo of the Sudden Attack-'). It is drawn by TATSUBON and published by Kodansha. Three tankōbon volumes has been published with about 12 chapters in total. It was serialized from the July 2010 issue to the May 2011 issue of Monthly Shōnen Rival. The first volume was published on 4 October 2010, the second volume on 4 February 2011, and the third volume on 3 June 2011. It follows the adventures of Warrior Sedo Nobusutatto, Archer Okiron Igunohisu, Sorceress Yuuri and Cleric Benetta as they fought to rescue the Prophetess Rose from a mysterious black figure, and to protect Saint Haven from a great danger.

Another manga based on the game, called Dragon Nest Kenja no Yogen (ドラゴンネスト 賢者の予言; lit. 'Dragon Nest- Prophecy of the Sage') started serialization from 27 July 2019 on the LINE Manga mobile application, with chapters released twice a week on Tuesday and Saturday. The manga was later also released on the Comico manga mobile application on 4 November, with the last chapter released on 19 January 2020, with a total of 60 chapters.

=== Music ===
Numerous theme songs have been used for the Japanese version of the game. There are three main theme songs for the game itself, the "White Version", the "Black Version" and the "second" theme song. The "White Version" theme song "Road to Glory～for Dragon Nest" was performed by KOKIA, and the "Black Version" theme song "EVER" was performed by GACKT. The song "Road to Glory～for Dragon Nest" was released on 18 August 2010 as part of the single "Road to Glory~long journey~" (the song is also in the album "REAL WORLD"), while "EVER" was released on 28 July. The 'second' main theme song "THE END OF THE DAY" was performed by YELLOW FRIED CHICKENz and the single was released on 14 September 2011 (the song can also be found in their album YELLOW FRIED CHICKENz I). The game story chapter "Resurrection" theme song "live your life" was performed by ViViD. The song was released on 27 June 2012 as part of their album INFINITY. The theme song of the story chapter "Side Story: Codename Zero" was "Battle of Destiny", performed by KOKIA and the single was released on 20 February 2013. To commemorate the launch of Dragon Nest "Reboot" in 2015, Uverworld performed the theme song of the reboot, "I love the World", which is also their 28th single, and was released on 26 August.

=== Drama CD ===
There is also a limited edition Dragon Nest drama CD, called Prelude～Unmei no Mezame～ (プレリュード～運命の目覚め～, Pureryuudo～Unmei no Mezame～; lit. 'Prelude- The Awakening of Fate'). It was released by Japanese record label Voice Records on 20 April 2011.

=== Figures ===
Japanese hobby products manufacturer Good Smile Company has released figures based on some characters in the game. A regular 1/8th scale PVC figure of the playable character Sorceress, sculpted by Usagi, and a Nendoroid figure of the popular non-playable character Events Planner Irine, sculpted by Shichibee, were released on 30 May 2013, with initial pre-orders only available in China. Good Smile Company later released the figurines for markets outside China in 2014. Nendoroid Irine was released for retail on 24 April, whereas the PVC figure of Sorceress was released on 2 June.

=== Films ===
A film based on the game, Dragon Nest: Warriors' Dawn, was released in 2014.

A film sequel, Dragon Nest 2: Throne of Elves, was released in 2016.
