= Throne of Elves =

- Poster
- Chinese: 精灵王座
- Directed by: Song Yuefeng
- Production companies: Shanghai Mijia Media; Horgos Caitiaowu Pictures; Beijing Enlight Pictures; HG Entertainment; Hu Na Kuai Le Yang Guang Hu Dong Yu Le Media 江苏省广播电视集团有限公司; 58.com Bilibili Film; Mili Entertainment
- Distributed by: Beijing Enlight Pictures
- Release date: August 19, 2016
- Running time: 104 minutes
- Country: China
- Languages: Mandarin; English; German
- Box office: CN¥23.4 million (US$3.9 million)

Throne of Elves (Chinese: 精灵王座), also known as Dragon's Nest 2: Throne of Elves, is a Chinese animated adventure romance film directed by Song Yuefeng. It was released in China by Beijing Enlight Pictures on August 19, 2016, in 2D and 3D. It is the sequel to the 2014 animated film Dragon Nest: Warriors' Dawn, based on the video game Dragon Nest.

== Plot ==
Several years after the events of the previous film, Liya's older brother, Alyan is set to marry Liya's friend and queen of the Elves, Mayre. With Mayre's reluctant permission, Liya also invites her human boyfriend, Little Fish, who has been apprenticing under Berlin the blacksmith, to the wedding. However, Mayre's sister Meyla who was long lost to evil, plots to gain power over all Elves by seizing her dark gem's counterpart and power source for the Elves, the Gem of Life, and summons the Elven ghosts from the ancient battleground to act as her army. Sensing the surge of darkness released by Meyla, Mayre entrusts the Gem of Life to Liya, but warns her not to show it to Fish because it must remain uncorrupted by desire and greed, which humans are particularly prone to.

Accompanied by Berlin, Barnac and his dogs Bow and Arrow, Fish visits Liya's home, where he gains an enthusiastic welcome by her but a frosty reception by the other Elves, including Alyan, who are prejudiced against humans. In the midst of the wedding ceremony, Meyla attacks and failing to find the Life Gem on Mayre, kidnaps her; when Fish tries to help, Meyla infects him with dark magic. Meyla demands that Alyan brings her the Gem of Life to the ancient battlefield in return for his bride. Alyan takes up pursuit with Liya and a force of guards; despite being forbidden to intervene, Fish and his companions follow them. Using a hoverboard invented by Berlin, Fish fetches Liya and they catch up with Meyla's flying ship. But while trying to free Mayre, Meyla ambushes them, forcing them to retreat, but not before she intrudes into Fish's mind, trying to control him.

Meyla leaves Mayre imprisoned in her fortress, the Dark Valley, a black mountain surrounded by lava furnaces, and travels to the north to join the soul of a great dragon frozen in the ice with her gem. After dropping Liya off on her brother's ship, Fish follows Meyla's mental call and she tries to exert her control over him. Fish resists and rejoins Aylan's party just as they reach the battlegrounds; the Elven ghosts ambush them, leaving only Alyan, Liya and a guard captain alive to be rescued by Fish and his companions. Later, however, Meyla forces Fish to bring her a magical map Alyan has taken along in order to track the Gem of Life. Finding it in Liya's possession, Meyla orders Fish to seize the Gem from her. The fight culminates in Fish and Liya shooting each other with arrows, but with his love for Liya enabling Fish to resist the mind control, he hits her with an arrow whose head he has broken off, sparing her, while Liya's arrow mortally wounds him. Desperate, Liya uses the Gem of Life on him, healing his injury.

Finally joining forces, the humans and Elves set course for the Dark Valley. They are ambushed and grounded by Meyla, but Liya uses an arrow to convey the Gem to Mayre, who uses its power to assist her saviors. Meyla taps into the dark gem's power to assume a demonic form, overpowering the Gem of Life. Fish uses the Gem as bait to lure Meyla to one of the furnaces and plunges himself into the lava, taking Meyla with him and therefore killing both of them. Just as the others are beginning to take in their loss, the Gem of Life activates, releasing the ghosts, turning the furnace into a tree, and bringing Fish back to life, convincing an awestruck Alyan that humans can be capable of virtue and self-sacrifice. As the companions leave, they miss the likewise resurrected Meyla lying amidst the tree's foliage, purged of the darkness that had consumed her.

== Cast ==
=== English dub cast ===
- Ryan Potter as Little Fish (called "Lambert" in the previous film)
- Ashley Boettcher as Princess Liya
- Anika Noni Rose as Meyla (named "Elena" in the previous film)
- Julie Nathanson as Queen Mayre (named "Nerwin" in the previous film)
- Gavin Hammon as Prince Alyan
- Kevin Michael Richardson as Barnac (credited as "Captain B")
- Enn Reitel as Blacksmith Berlin
- G. K. Bowes as Elf Captain
- Jon Olson as creature voices
- Stephanie Sheh and Michael Sinterniklaas as additional voices

=== Chinese voice cast ===
- Ji Guanlin as Queen Mayre

== Reception ==
The film has grossed CN¥23.4 million at the Chinese box office.
