= Corpse Bride =

2005 stop-motion animated film by Tim Burton

- Theatrical release poster
- Directed by: Mike Johnson; Tim Burton
- Screenplay by: John August; Caroline Thompson; Pamela Pettler
- Based on: "The Finger" from Lilith’s Cave: Jewish Tales of the Supernatural (1987) by Howard Schwartz
- Produced by: Tim Burton; Allison Abbate
- Starring: Johnny Depp; Helena Bonham Carter
- Cinematography: Pete Kozachik
- Edited by: Jonathan Lucas; Chris Lebenzon
- Music by: Danny Elfman (score and songs)
- Production companies: Tim Burton Productions; Laika Entertainment (Note: Studio credit only)
- Distributed by: Warner Bros. Pictures
- Release dates: September 7, 2005 (Venice); September 23, 2005 (United States); October 13, 2005 (United Kingdom)
- Running time: 77 minutes
- Country: United States
- Language: English
- Budget: $40 million
- Box office: $118.1 million

Corpse Bride is a 2005 American stop-motion animated musical romantic fantasy film directed by Mike Johnson and Tim Burton and written by John August, Caroline Thompson, and Pamela Pettler. Set in an English village, Corpse Bride stars Johnny Depp as the voice of Victor, while Helena Bonham Carter voices Emily, the title character. An international co-production between the United States and United Kingdom, produced by Tim Burton Productions and Laika Entertainment, and distributed by Warner Bros. Pictures, Corpse Bride is the first stop-motion feature film directed by Burton after previously producing The Nightmare Before Christmas (1993) and James and the Giant Peach (1996).

Corpse Bride drew inspiration from "The Finger", a 17th-century Jewish folktale put down by Howard Schwartz, which Joe Ranft introduced to Burton while they were finishing The Nightmare Before Christmas. Work on the film started in November 2003 while Burton was wrapping up his previous live action feature Big Fish. His next live-action tenure, Charlie and the Chocolate Factory, was produced simultaneously with Corpse Bride. Production of the stop-motion animation feature took place at 3 Mills Studios in London. It was shot with Canon EOS-1D Mark II digital SLRs, rather than the 35 mm film cameras used for The Nightmare Before Christmas. Burton immediately brought regular collaborators Depp, Bonham Carter and Danny Elfman aboard. Corpse Bride is dedicated to executive producer Ranft, who died a month before the film's release.

Corpse Bride premiered at the 62nd Venice International Film Festival on September 7, 2005, and was released in theaters on September 23 in the U.S. and on October 13 in the U.K. to critical and commercial success. The film was nominated for Best Animated Feature at the 78th Academy Awards.

== Plot ==
In an English village in the 1800s, Victor Van Dort, the son of nouveau riche fish merchants, and Victoria Everglot, the neglected daughter of impoverished aristocrats, prepare for their arranged marriage, which will simultaneously raise the social class of the Van Dort family and restore the wealth of the Everglot family ("According to Plan"). Although the two are initially nervous, they become smitten and fall in love instantly when they meet; however, the nervous Victor ruins their wedding rehearsal by forgetting his vows, dropping the ring, and accidentally setting Lady Everglot's dress on fire.

Fleeing to a nearby forest, Victor successfully rehearses his vows with a tree and places his wedding ring on what appears to be an upturned root. However, the "root" is revealed to be the skeletal finger of a deceased woman named Emily, who, gowned in a wedding dress, rises from the grave and proclaims herself as Victor's new wife. She spirits them both away to the Land of the Dead, a colorful and whimsical realm in which the spirits of the deceased reside.

During his time with Emily, Victor learns that she was murdered years earlier on the night of her elopement by her fiancé, who stole the family jewels and gold she had brought ("Remains of the Day"). She reunites him with his long-dead dog Scraps, and they bond. However, desperate to return to Victoria, Victor tricks Emily into returning them to the Land of the Living by claiming he wants her to meet his parents.

Emily brings Victor to see Elder Gutknecht, the kindly ruler of the underworld, who grants them temporary passage. Victor reunites with Victoria and confesses his wish to marry her as soon as possible. Before they can share a kiss, Emily discovers them and drags Victor back to the Land of the Dead, feeling betrayed and hurt ("Tears to Shed"). Victoria tries to tell her parents and the village pastor of Victor's situation, but nobody believes her. Assuming Victor has left her, Victoria's parents decide to marry her against her will to Lord Barkis Bittern, a presumed-wealthy visitor who appeared at the wedding rehearsal.

After reconciling with Emily, Victor learns of Victoria's impending marriage to Barkis from his family's newly deceased coachman Mayhew. Upset over this news, he decides to marry Emily properly after overhearing Elder Gutknecht tell her that due to Victor still being alive while she is dead, her accidental marriage to Victor is nullified by default. He knows that this will require him to repeat his wedding vows with her in the Land of the Living and drink the poison 'the Wine of Ages' in order to join Emily in death.

The dead swiftly prepare for the ceremony and head "upstairs" ("The Wedding Song"). There, the village erupts into a temporary panic upon their arrival, until the living recognize their departed loved ones and joyously reunite with them. The chaos causes a panicked Barkis to expose his own poor financial standing and his intentions to marry Victoria only for her supposed wealth, leading her to reject him.

Victoria witnesses Victor and Emily's wedding as Victor completes his vows and prepares to drink the poison, only for Emily to stop him when she realizes she is denying Victoria her chance to live happily with him. Just as Emily reunites Victor and Victoria, Barkis arrives to kidnap Victoria; Emily recognizes Barkis as both her previous fiancé and murderer. Victor duels with Barkis to protect Victoria, and Emily intervenes to save Victor's life.

Accepting defeat, Barkis mockingly toasts Emily for dying unwed and unwittingly drinks the poison, causing him to die. This allows the dead, who cannot interfere in the affairs of the living, to take retribution against him for his crimes. Emily, now freed from her torment, releases Victor of his vow to marry her and returns his ring, so he can marry Victoria. As she steps into the moonlight, she dissolves into a swarm of butterflies that fly into the sky as Victor and Victoria watch and embrace.

== Voice cast ==
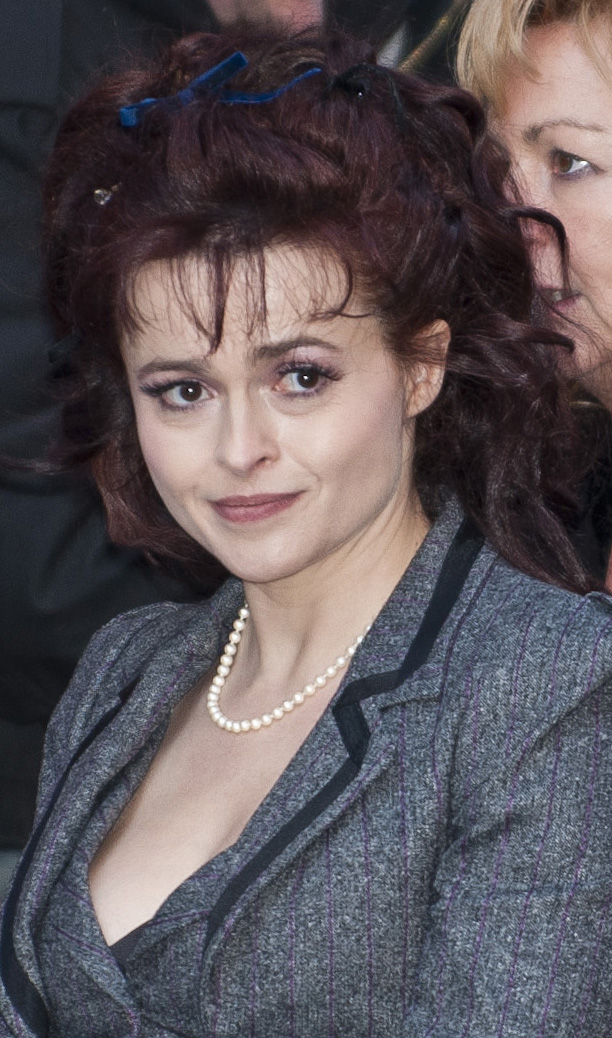
Helena Bonham Carter voices the title character.

- Johnny Depp as Victor Van Dort, a timid, but good-natured young man who is engaged to Victoria Everglot for social and financial reasons
- Helena Bonham Carter as Emily the Corpse Bride, a beautiful and naive young revenant woman with a passion for music and dance
- Emily Watson as Victoria Everglot, Victor's pretty, sweet-natured, yet abused fiancée
- Richard E. Grant as Barkis Bittern, a charming yet murderous con artist, later revealed to be Emily's former fiancé and killer
- Albert Finney as two characters:
  - Lord Finis Everglot, Victoria's abusive toad-like, unloving Baron father and Maudeline's husband
  - Grandfather Everglot, Finis' deceased grandfather, Maudeline's grandfather-in-law and Victoria's great-grandfather
- Joanna Lumley as Lady Maudeline Everglot, Victoria's abusive, large-chinned, unloving mother and Finis' wife
- Tracey Ullman as two characters:
  - Nell Van Dort, Victor's socially ambitious mother and William's wife who loves her son, but holds too much contempt for him
  - Hildegarde, the elderly maid of the Everglot household
- Paul Whitehouse as three characters:
  - William Van Dort, Victor's absent-minded and tactless fish merchant father and Nell's husband
  - Mayhew, the Van Dorts' smoking coachman
  - Paul the Head Waiter, literally a severed head
- Christopher Lee as Pastor Galswells, a haughty and bad-tempered priest who is hired to conduct Victor and Victoria's wedding ceremony
- Michael Gough as Elder Gutknecht, an ancient and rickety skeleton who rules benevolently over the underworld
- Jane Horrocks as two characters:
  - The Black Widow Spider, an affable seamstress
  - Mrs. Plum, a dead chef working at the Ball and Socket Pub
- Enn Reitel as two characters:
  - The Maggot, Emily's sarcastic friend who lives inside her head and acts as her conscience, parodying Hungarian-born actor Peter Lorre
  - The Town Crier, who alerts the Van Dorts and Everglots about Victor and Emily's marriage
- Deep Roy as General Bonesapart, a diminutive skeleton in a military uniform with a sword stuck in his chest. He is a parody of Napoleon Bonaparte.
- Danny Elfman as Bonejangles, a vivacious, one-eyed, lounge singing skeleton
- Stephen Ballantyne as Emil, the Everglots' long-suffering butler

== Production ==
Corpse Bride is based on "The Finger", a 17th-century Jewish folktale put down by Howard Schwartz, which Joe Ranft introduced to Tim Burton while they were finishing The Nightmare Before Christmas. The film began production in November 2003, while Burton was wrapping up Big Fish. His next live-action feature, Charlie and the Chocolate Factory, was produced simultaneously with Corpse Bride. Co-director Mike Johnson spoke about how they took a more organic approach to directing the film, saying: "In a co-directing situation, one director usually handles one sequence while the other handles another. Our approach was more organic. Tim knew where he wanted the film to go as far as the emotional tone and story points to hit. My job was to work with the crew on a daily basis and get the footage as close as possible to how I thought he wanted it."

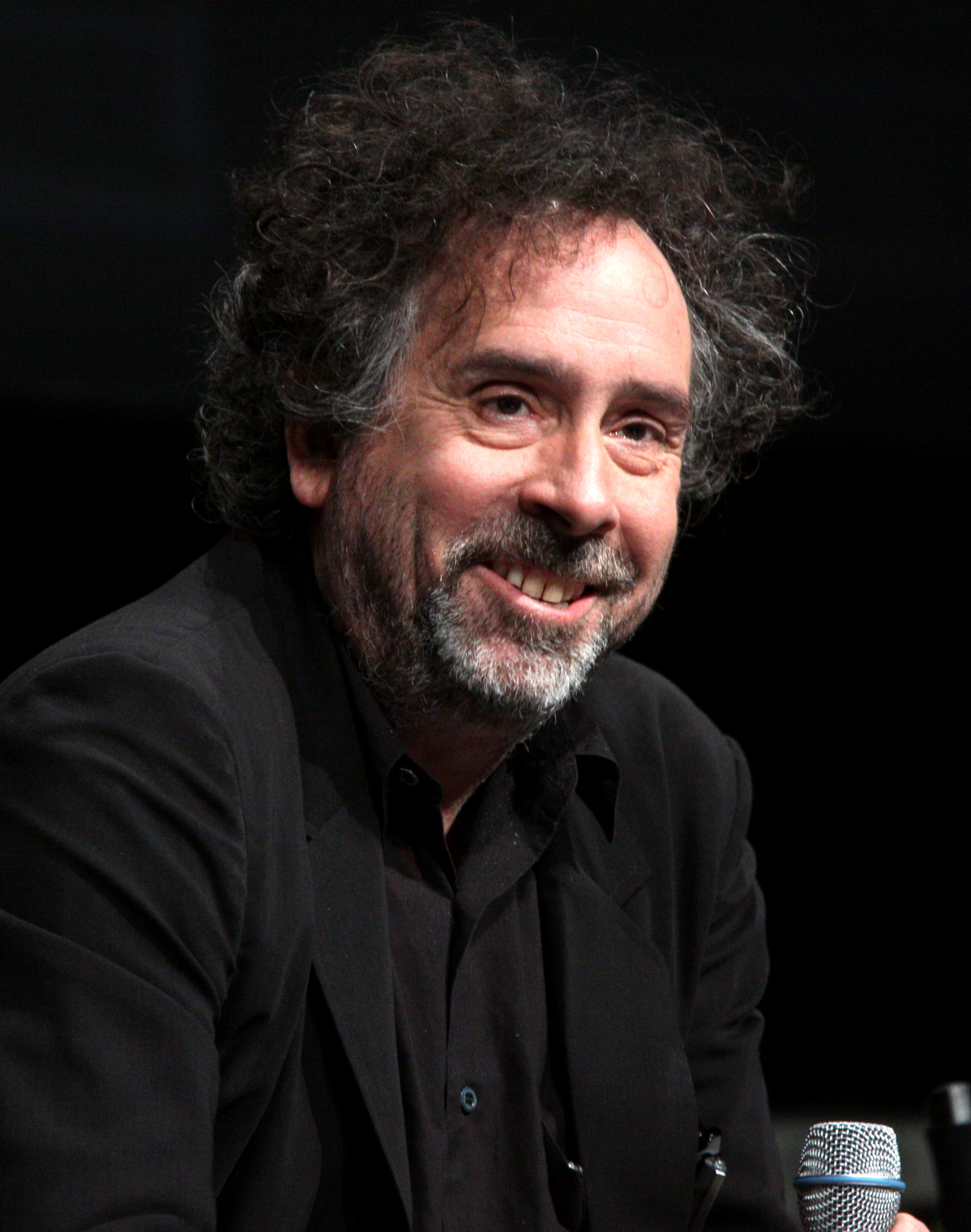
Tim Burton co-directed the film.

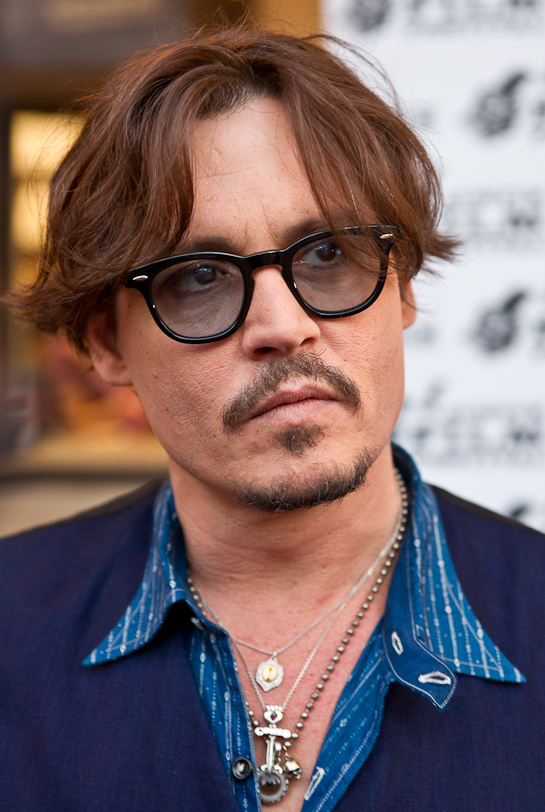
Johnny Depp filmed Charlie and the Chocolate Factory and recorded dialogue for Corpse Bride simultaneously.

In a 2005 interview with About.com, Burton spoke about the differences between directing Corpse Bride and The Nightmare Before Christmas, despite Nightmare having been directed by Henry Selick with Burton serving in a producer role, saying: "The difference on that was that one I had designed completely. It was a very completed package in my mind. I felt like it was there. I felt more comfortable with it. With this, it was a bit more organic. It was based on an old folk tale. We kept kind of changing it but, you know, I had a great co-director with Mike Johnson. I feel like we complemented each other quite well. It was just a different movie, a different process."

Burton also spoke about casting Johnny Depp as Victor, saying, "It was weird because we were doing both at the same time. He was Willy Wonka by day and Victor by night so it might have been a little schizophrenic for him. But he's great. It's the first animated movie he's done and he's always into a challenge. We just treat it like fun and a creative process. Again, that's the joy of working with him. He's kind of up for anything. He just always adds something to it. The amazing thing is all the actors never worked [together]. They were never in a room together, so they were all doing their voices, except for Albert [Finney] and Joanna [Lumley] did a few scenes together, everybody else was separate. They were all kind of working in a vacuum, which was interesting. That's the thing that I felt ended up so beautifully, that their performances really meshed together. So he was very canny, as they all were, about trying to find the right tone and making it work while not being in the same room with each other."

== Music ==
The soundtrack was composed by Danny Elfman with the help of John August and released on September 20, 2005. It contains all of the music from the film including score music and four songs with lyrics sung by voice actors. In the United Kingdom, the album peaked at number 13 on the Soundtrack Albums Chart on 30 October 2005, spending a total of five weeks on that chart.

== Release ==
=== Theatrical ===
Corpse Bride had its world premiere at the 62nd Venice International Film Festival on September 7, 2005. The film was released on September 23, 2005, in United States and on October 13, 2005, in the United Kingdom.

=== Home media ===
Corpse Bride was released on DVD on January 31, 2006, and on Blu-ray on September 26, 2006. Most copies present the film in its original widescreen aspect ratio of 1.85:1, although some feature a 1.33:1 fullscreen ratio instead. As of August 16, 2009, the film has sold 2,093,156 DVDs and 40,411 Blu-ray Discs totaling a gross of $33,087,513 and $604,940 respectively. As of November 25, 2020, the total gross for domestic video sales is $42,700,692 in the U.S. As of 2024, over 500,000 copies had been printed. The film was re-released on 4K Ultra HD Blu-ray on September 23, 2025.

== Reception ==
=== Box office ===
Corpse Bride grossed $53.4 million in the United States and Canada, and $64.7 million in other territories, for a worldwide total of $118.1 million.

In the United States and Canada, the film opened at number two in its first weekend, with $19.1 million behind Flightplan. In its second weekend, the film dropped to number three, grossing an additional $10 million. In its third weekend, the film dropped to number six, grossing $6.5 million. In its fourth weekend, the film dropped to number nine, grossing $3.6 million. The film opened at number one in France with a gross of $2.8 million and in Mexico with $1.7 million.

The biggest market in other territories being France, United Kingdom, and Japan, where the film grossed $8.9 million, $8.6 million and $7.1 million respectively.

=== Critical response ===
Corpse Bride has been well received since its release, with many critics praising its animation and story. On the review aggregator website Rotten Tomatoes, the film holds an approval rating of 84% based on 197 reviews, with an average rating of 7.2/10. The website's critics consensus reads, "As can be expected from a Tim Burton movie, Corpse Bride is whimsically macabre, visually imaginative, and emotionally bittersweet." Metacritic, which assigns a rating out of 100 based on top reviews from mainstream critics, calculated a score of 83 based on 35 reviews, indicating "universal acclaim". Audiences polled by CinemaScore gave the film an average grade of "B+" on an A+ to F scale.

Justin Chang of Variety gave the film a positive review, saying, "This macabre musical about a young bridegroom who mistakenly weds a girl from beyond the grave is an endearingly schizoid Frankenstein of a movie, by turns relentlessly high-spirited and darkly poignant." Kirk Honeycutt of The Hollywood Reporter gave the film a positive review, calling it "A wondrous flight of fancy, a stop-motion-animated treat brimming with imaginative characters, evocative sets, sly humor, inspired songs and a genuine whimsy that seldom finds its way into today's movies."

Michael Atkinson of The Village Voice gave the film a positive review, saying, "The variety of its cadaverous style is never less than inspired; never has the human skull's natural grin been redeployed so exhaustively for yuks." Owen Gleiberman of Entertainment Weekly gave the film a B, saying, "As an achievement in macabre visual wizardry, Tim Burton's Corpse Bride has to be reckoned some sort of marvel."

Manohla Dargis of The New York Times gave the film four out of five stars, saying, "Cinema's reinvigorated fixation with the living dead suggests that we are in the grip of an impossible longing, or perhaps it's just another movie cycle running its course. Whatever the case, there is something heartening about Mr. Burton's love for bones and rot here, if only because it suggests, despite some recent evidence, that he is not yet ready to abandon his own dark kingdom." Moira MacDonald of The Seattle Times gave the film three and a half stars out of four, saying, "What makes Corpse Bride sing, ultimately, is the breadth of imagination that it demonstrates; creating a cluttered, textured and mysteriously beautiful world that we're loathe [sic] to leave at the end."

Liam Lacey of The Globe and Mail gave the film three out of four stars, saying, "Ghoulishness and innocence walk hand-in-hand in Tim Burton's Corpse Bride, a movie that digs into Hollywood's past to resurrect the antique art of stop-motion animation and create a fabulous bauble of a movie." Jack Mathews of the New York Daily News gave the film three and a half stars out of four, saying, "Stop-motion animation may be the hardest and most tedious job in Hollywood, but the makers of Tim Burton's Corpse Bride deserve a couple of years in Tahiti celebrating their effort."

Lisa Rose of the Newark Star-Ledger gave the film three out of five stars, saying, "Corpse Bride offers unclassifiable enchantment." James Berardinelli of ReelViews gave the film three out of four stars, saying, "As animated films go, this is easily the best of a weak year." Peter Howell of the Toronto Star gave the film four out of four stars, saying, "If his The Nightmare Before Christmas from a dozen years back was a treat for the eyes and mind, Tim Burton's Corpse Bride goes double or nothing by being a delight for the ears and also the heart." Joe Williams of the St. Louis Post-Dispatch gave the film a B+, saying, "Beneath the bone pile of allusions, Corpse Bride is a darkly enchanting fable in its own right."

Andrew Sarris of The New York Observer gave the film a negative review, saying, "Corpse Bride turns out to be a ponderous mixture of puppetry and animation that is far too technologically complex and laborious for this hopelessly Luddite reviewer." Roger Ebert gave the film three out of four stars, calling it "A sweet and visually lovely tale of love lost." Roger Moore of the Orlando Sentinel gave the film four out of five stars, saying, "The sweetness, the visual flourishes and inspired pieces of casting carry the Corpse Bride, if not all the way down the primrose path, then at least across the threshold." Robert K. Elder of the Chicago Tribune gave the film three and a half stars out of four, saying, "If Nightmare Before Christmas was a jazzy pop number, Corpse Bride is a waltz—an elegant, deadly funny bit of macabre matrimony."

Kenneth Turan of the Los Angeles Times gave the film two out of five stars, saying, "The film does have a fairy-tale aspect, but, like many of its characters, it is more dead and buried than fully alive." Claudia Puig of USA Today gave the film three and a half stars out of four, saying, "Corpse Bride is an unexpectedly touching celebration of love told in a quirky and inventive style." Peter Travers of Rolling Stone gave the film three and a half stars out of five, saying, "In the guise of a family film, Burton evokes a darkly erotic obsession that recalls Edgar Allan Poe and Hitchcock's Vertigo. It would be a test for any filmmaker, and Burton aces it."

Steven Rea of The Philadelphia Inquirer gave the film three and a half stars out of four, saying, "Tim Burton's Corpse Bride is easily the best stop-motion animated necrophiliac musical romantic comedy of all time. It is also just simply, wonderful: a morbid, merry tale of true love that dazzles the eyes and delights the soul." Michael Booth of The Denver Post gave the film three and a half stars out of four, saying, "Corpse Bride will win your heart, if it doesn't rip it out of your chest first." Terry Lawson of the Detroit Free Press gave the film three out of four stars, saying, "There's a happy Halloween in store even for children who aren't allowed to trick or treat, and it's courtesy of Tim Burton's animated Corpse Bride."

Bruce Westbrook of The Houston Chronicle gave the film three and a half stars out of four, saying, "Amazingly fluid and drop-dead gorgeous, Tim Burton's Corpse Bride is the best-looking, stop-motion animation film ever." Rene Rodriguez of the Miami Herald gave the film two and a half stars out of four, saying, "Corpse Bride suffers from the same problem that has plagued Burton's recent live-action films: for all its formidable razzle-dazzle, it doesn't engage the heart." Colin Covert of the Star Tribune gave the film three and a half stars out of four, saying, "This vibrantly imaginative mix of horror and humor puts the f-u-n in funeral."

=== Accolades ===
Corpse Bride was nominated at the 78th Academy Awards for Best Animated Feature.

The film won the National Board of Review for Best Animated Feature in 2005 and the Annie Awards Ub Iwerks Award for Technical Achievement in 2006, where it was also nominated for Best Animated Feature, Best Character Design, and Best Direction.

The film was named winner of the Best European Feature Film category at the British Animation Awards in 2006.

In 2008, the American Film Institute nominated this film for its Top 10 Animation Films list.

== See also ==
- Lists of animated films
- List of stop motion films
- Posthumous marriage
- Coraline
