= Howard Schwartz =

American poet and folklorist

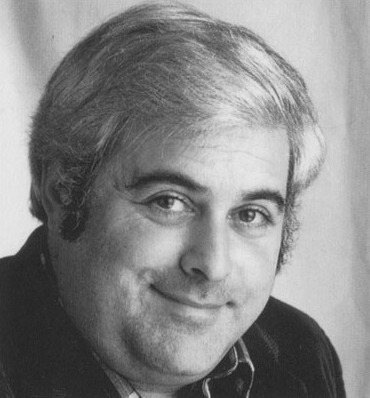
- Born: April 21, 1945 (age 81); St. Louis, Missouri, U.S.
- Occupations: Author, professor, editor
- Writing career
- Genres: myth, poetry, fiction

Howard Schwartz (born April 21, 1945) is an American folklorist, author, poet, and editor of dozens of books. He has won the international Koret Jewish Book Award, for the book Before You Were Born, and won a 2005 National Jewish Book Award for Tree of Souls: The Mythology of Judaism. He has been featured in the Jewish Children's Book Project, local media in his hometown of Saint Louis, The Jerusalem Post, and The Canadian Jewish News, as well as in many other publications.

== Parents and early life ==
Schwartz was born April 21, 1945, to Nathan and Bluma (Rubin).

== Publications and awards ==
Schwartz's later work in Jewish folklore, fiction, poetry, and children's literature has been recognized by more than forty organizations and literary bodies. He won the Aesop Prize from the American Folklore Society, the American Book Award from the Before Columbus Foundation, and the Sydney Taylor Book Award, among others.

More recently, the author was awarded the 2005 National Jewish Book Award for his reference book Tree of Souls: The Mythology of Judaism, an extensive attempt—almost 700 pages—to demonstrate the existence of a Jewish mythology.

His children's story, Before You Were Born, was named one of the top ten children's books of 2005 and was given the Koret International Jewish Book Award from the Koret Foundation in 2006. Before You Were Born describes the angel Lailah, who shares all the secrets of life with children while they are still inside the womb.

Schwartz has been nominated for the National Jewish Book Award six times and has won the award three times.

- The Diamond Tree: Jewish Tales from Around the World – Nominee in category Children's Literature, 1992
- Next Year in Jerusalem: 3000 Years of Jewish Stories – Winner in category Children's Literature, 1996
- Reimagining the Bible: The Storytelling of the Rabbis – Finalist in category Jewish Thought, 1999
- The Day the Rabbi Disappeared: Jewish Holiday Tales of Magic – Winner in category Children's Literature. 2000.
- Invisible Kingdoms: Jewish Tales of Angels, Spirits and Demons – Sole finalist in category Children's Literature, 2002-2003
- Tree of Souls: The Mythology of Judaism National Jewish Book Award – Winner in category Reference, 2005

Schwartz works with oral and written sources as a collector and re-teller of Jewish stories and midrash. In this capacity, he has collected more than a thousand unique tales from around the world in several major collections.

- Elijah’s Violin and Other Jewish Fairy Tales (1983) ISBN 0-19-509200-7
- Miriam’s Tambourine: Jewish Folktales from around the World (1986) ISBN 0-19-282136-9
- Lilith’s Cave: Jewish Tales of the Supernatural (1987) ISBN 0-19-506726-6
- Gabriel’s Palace: Jewish Mystical Tales (1993) ISBN 0-19-509388-7
- Tree of Souls: The Mythology of Judaism (2008) ISBN 978-0-19-532713-7
- Leaves from the Garden of Eden (2008) ISBN 0-19-533565-1

== See also ==
- Malakh
