= Critical Ops =

Mobile FPS

- Developer: Critical Force Ltd.
- Publisher: Critical Force Ltd.
- Designer: Tim Spaninks
- Engine: Unity
- Platforms: iOS; Android
- Release: September 2015: Facebook Gameroom August 30, 2016 August 14, 2015 (web) Android 4.4+: August 22, 2017 February 24, 2017 (4.1+) September 30, 2015 (4.0.3+) iOS 10.0+: December 18, 2017 August 22, 2017 (9.0+) September 1, 2016 (8.1+) May 2, 2016 (7.0+, Beginning of soft launch)
- Genre: First-person shooter
- Modes: Team Deathmatch, Defuse, Wingman, Ranked Defuse

Critical Ops (abbreviated as C-OPS) is a multiplayer first-person shooter video game developed and published by Critical Force Ltd. It was released as open alpha in September 2015 for Android, and stayed in open beta until the game's official release in November 2018. Critical Ops is currently available on Google Play (for Android), Apple App Store (for iOS), and Amazon Appstore. Previously, it was available on PC through the Facebook Gameroom platform until July 10, 2017.

Since November 20, 2025, the game can be played on PC again by installing Google Play Games on your PC. A fully-fledged PC version is not planned.

Critical Ops core gameplay is heavily influenced by the Counter-Strike series.

== Gameplay ==
Two opposing teams of Coalition (representing Counter-Terrorism units) and The Breach (representing Terrorism units) fight against each other to complete their objectives. A team wins by either completing specified objectives, or by eliminating the other team. The game features other game modes such as Team Deathmatch, Defuse, Elimination, Defend, Wingman, Ranked Defuse, Gun-Game, Practice and Event Modes. Players can also choose to host customized rooms and join rooms hosted by other players using Custom Matches.

== Ranks ==
Ranks can be achieved by playing The Ranked Game Mode, Ranked is a competitive & intense game mode where two teams - The Breach and The Coalition - face off in a 5v5 Defuse matches. The Breach's aim is to eliminate all 5 Coalition members or successfully plant and detonate the bomb. The Coalition's aim is to eliminate all 5 Breach Members or defend the site. The first team to win 13 rounds wins the match. Rank placement matches puts players in the same rank as they are or 1 rank above or below their rank. Ranked matches usually last around 40 minutes.

Critical Ops players can achieve 9 ranks. Iron, Bronze, Silver, Gold, Platinum, Diamond, Master, Special Ops and Elite Ops are all of the ranks achieveable.

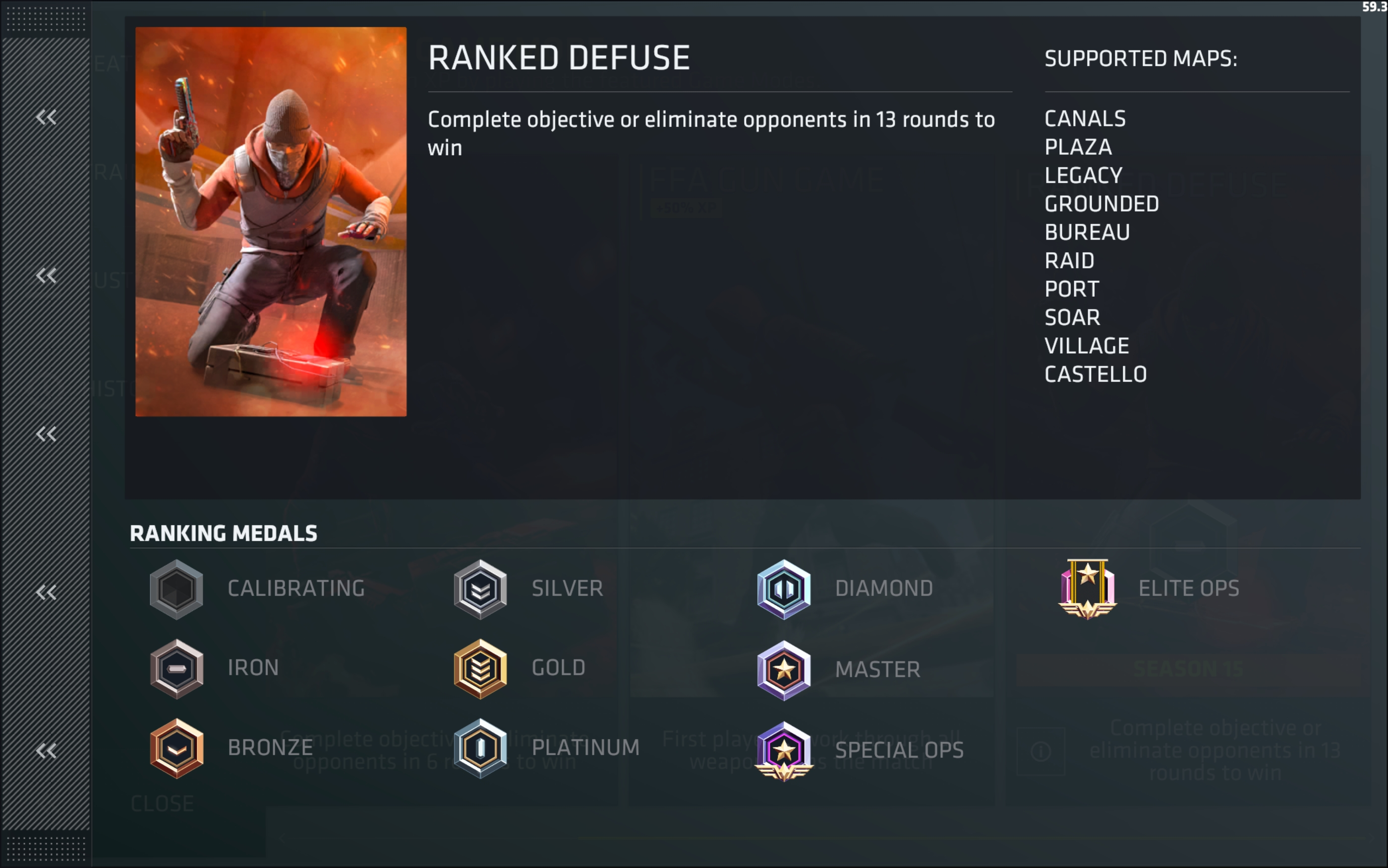
In-game description of Ranked Game Mode.

== Currency ==
The game uses one kind of currency, Credits. They can be used to unlock skins. Credits, which can also be used to open cases. Credits can be purchased in the store or can be earned for free by doing various tasks, i.e., watching advertisements, completing offers (by downloading and completing the tasks given for the game), and completing milestones for each weapon.

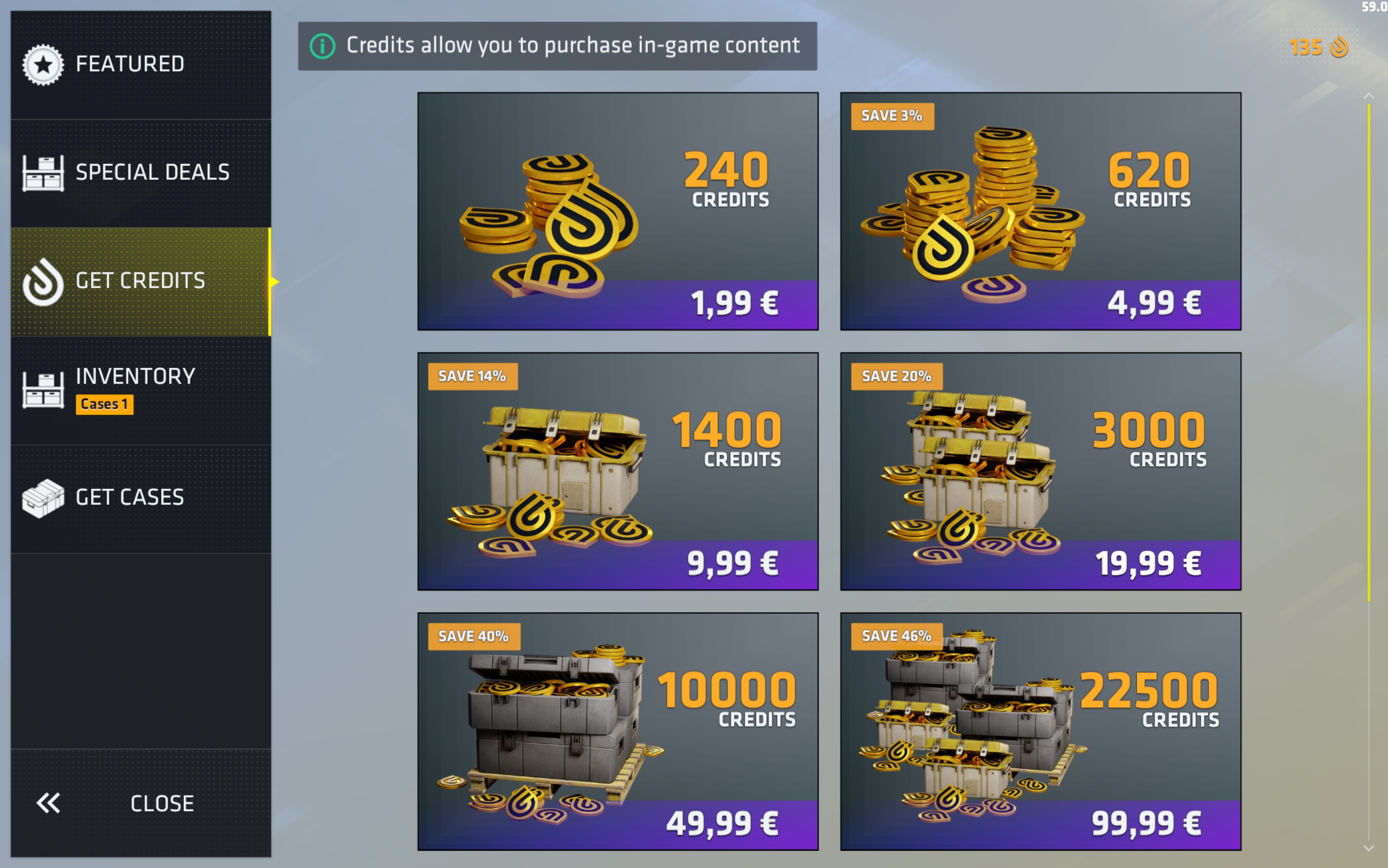
The currency of the game, purchasable with real money...

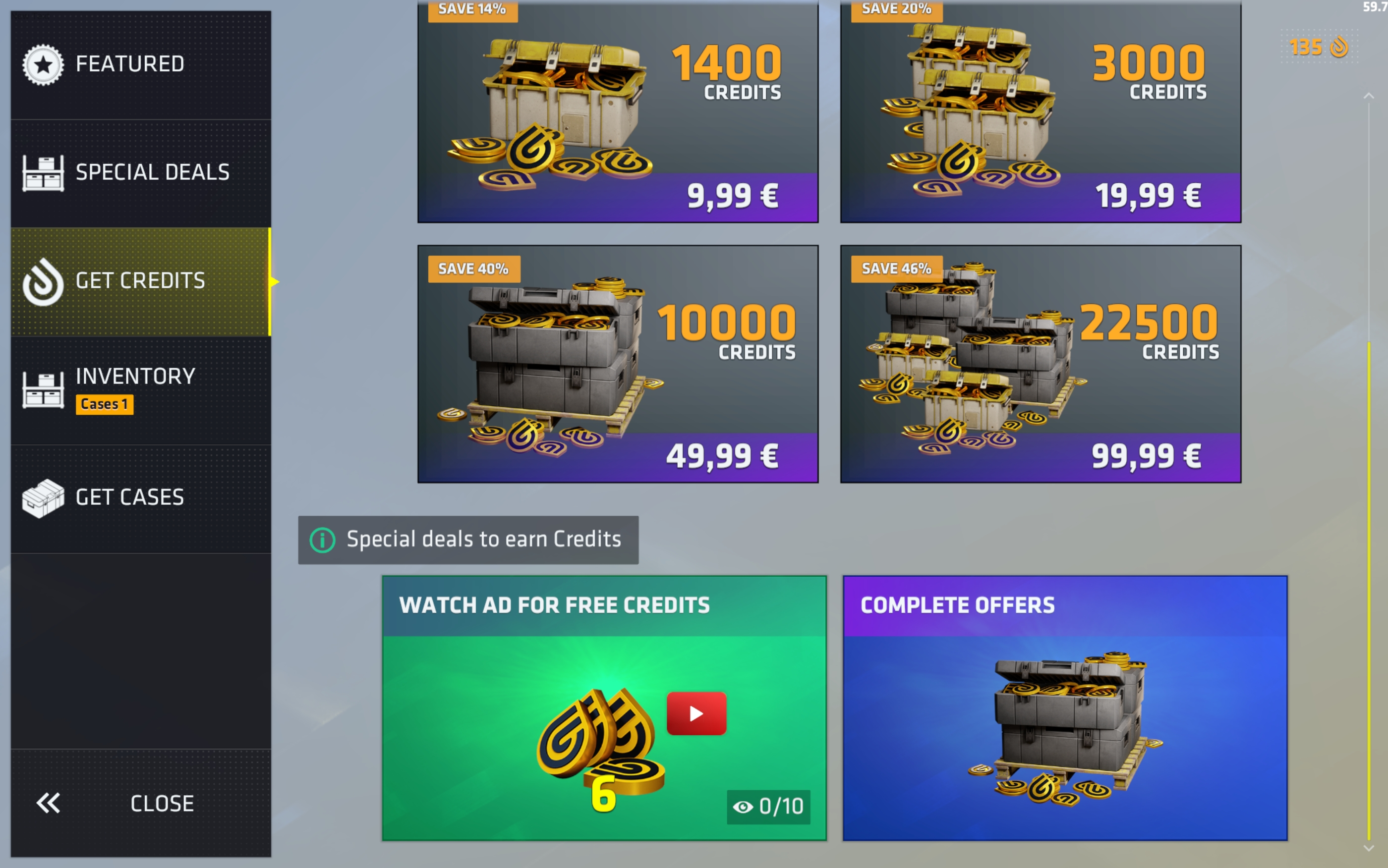
... or by watching ads.

== Cases ==
There are three Types of Cases in the game:

- Recruit Cases: obtained for free from the Critical Pass or from completing daily tasks (Kill 35 Enemies), these cases range from "Very Common" rarity to "Rare" rarity, with the rarest items being Agents.
- Standard Cases: These cases can be obtained from the premium Critical Pass as well as from the shop where the player can buy them for 200 credits. These cases contain all rarities in the game, ranging from "Very Common" to "Legendary".
- Event Cases: These cases can be obtained in various ways, mainly through the premium Critical Pass but also through the shop and tournament prizing, they cost 500 credits in the shop and contain exclusive event-themed skins for weapons, they range from the "Uncommon" rarity to the "Legendary" rarity.

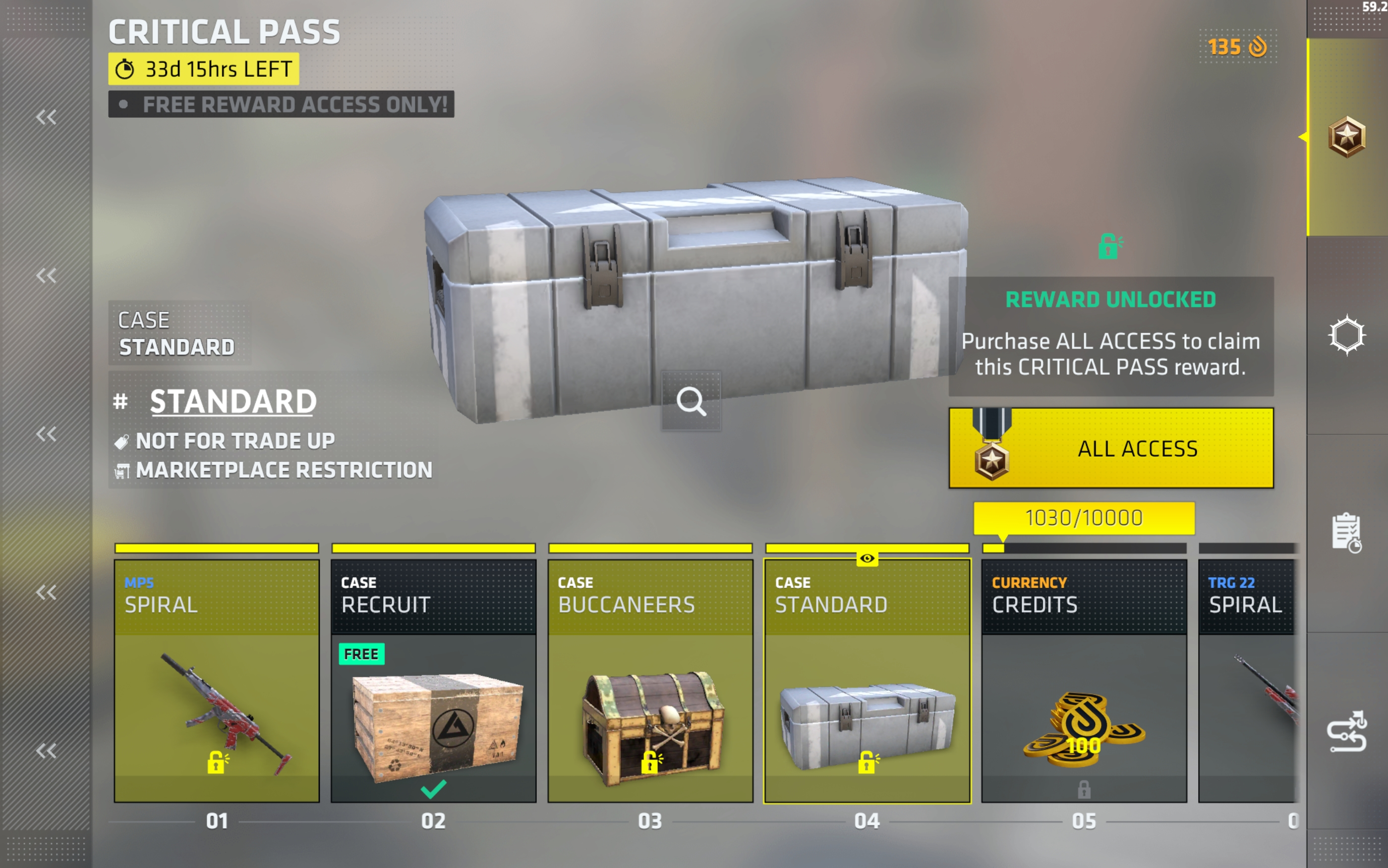
The three different case types: Recruit Case (left), Event Case (middle) and Standard Case (right)

== Passes ==
Passes offer various skins for completing each level. There are two types of passes- Free and Elite Passes. The Free pass is available for all players; however, it has fewer skins compared to the Elite pass. The Elite pass can be bought for 1400 credits. The pass consists of 30 levels, and each level has a skin, and the end of the pass usually has higher-tier skins. The last season pass was released in update 1.34.0. In 1.35.0 was released an Operation – it's like Critical Pass but with more tiers. In these Operations are 100 tiers. Currently there is 2nd Operation. The first Operation was Operation Frontier.

== Skins ==
There are various skins that can be applied on Agents, Weapons & Gloves for customization. Weapon Animations are also available and Emblems. These skins come in different rarities. The rarities are as follows in order; Very Common, Common, Uncommon, Rare, Very Rare, Epic, Legendary. These skins can be earned through the purchase of crates, the marketplace, passes, lucky spin, offers/bundles and with in-game credits.

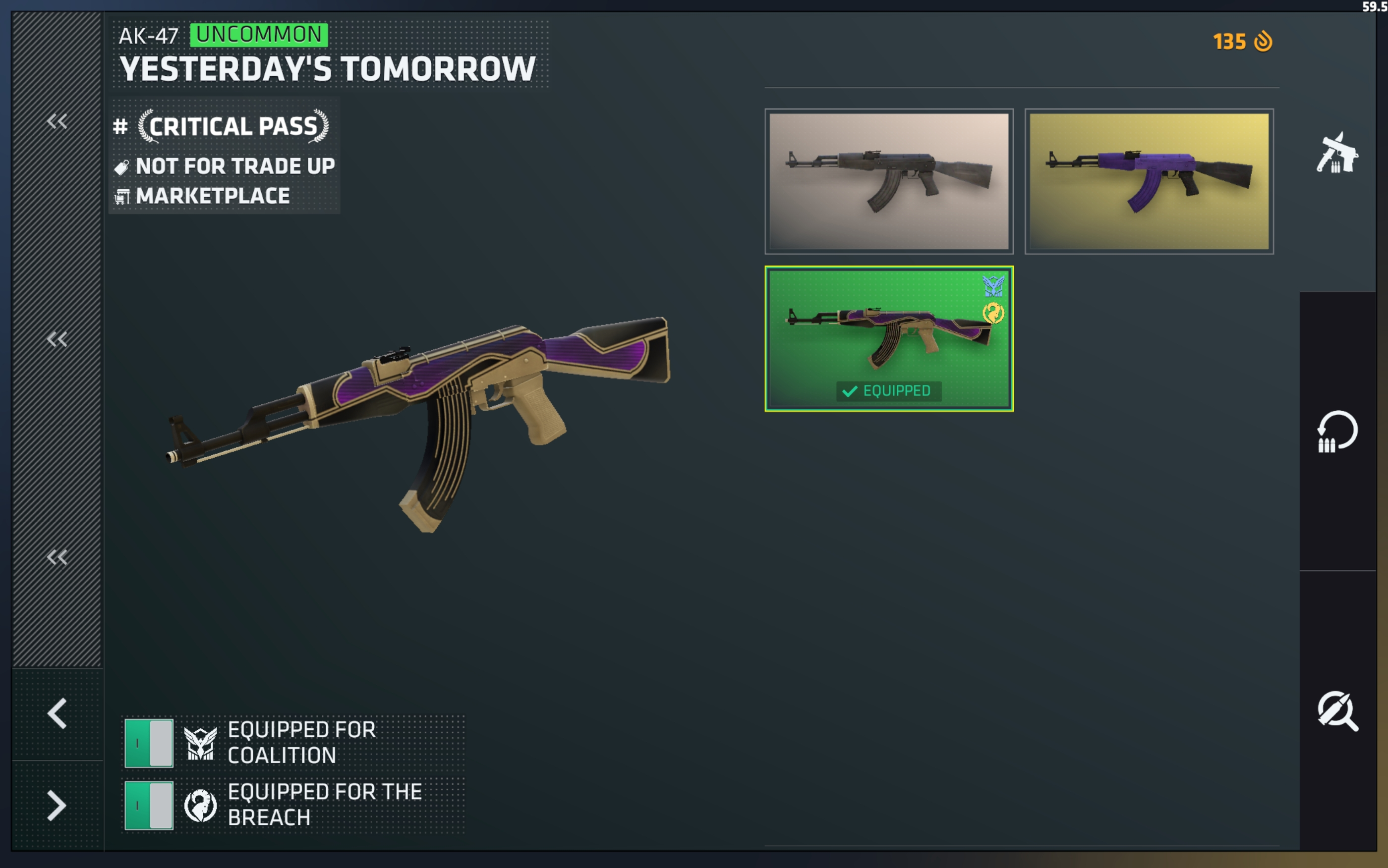
Weapons can be customized with different skins.

== Weapons ==
Critical Ops offers a variety of weapons in which players can select from, there is the Primary Weapons section which include weapons such as Assault Rifles : AK-47, M4, SG 551, AUG, HK 417, SA58, AR-15, SCAR-H. Submachine Guns such as : P90, MP5, MP7, VECTOR, and the MPX. Shotguns such as FP6, M1887, SUPER 90, KSG. Sniper Rifles such as: URATIO, M14, TRG22, SVD. The Secondary Weapons section include Pistols such as: P250, XD.45, GSR 1911, MR 96, DEAGLE, DUAL MTX. In the Tertiary Weapons Section are the Melee which are knives such as: KNIFE, TAC-TOOL, REMIX, KUKRI and More. The game also has utility such as Helmet and Kevlar available for Team Deathmatch and Defuse and other Utility such only available for Defuse such as: Frag Grenade, Flashbang Grenade, Smoke Grenade and Incendiary Grenade.

The following list contains detailed information on all weapons in the game as of November 18, 2025 and can be found at https://criticalopsgame.com/intel/weapons/.

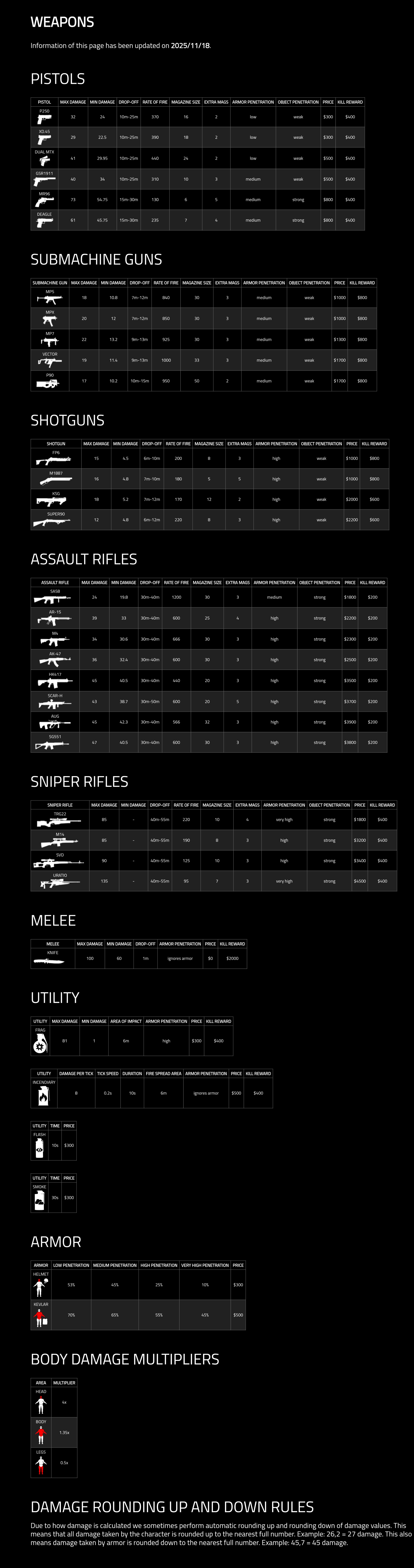

== Maps ==
The Maps in Critical Ops are based in real life countries and cities. For example the map Plaza is based in Barcelona, Spain and Castello is based in Italy. There are 5 maps for Team Deathmatch which are: Brewery, Division, Heat, Gallery and Cargo. There are 10 maps for Defuse which are: Bureau, Raid, Plaza, Legacy, Canals, Grounded, Village, Port, Soar and Castello. There are 3 Maps for Elimination Game Mode which are: Warehouse, Overhaul and Impasse. There are other various maps for Special Event Game modes which include: Purify, Hangar, Arctic, Park, Shanty, Legian and Bout.

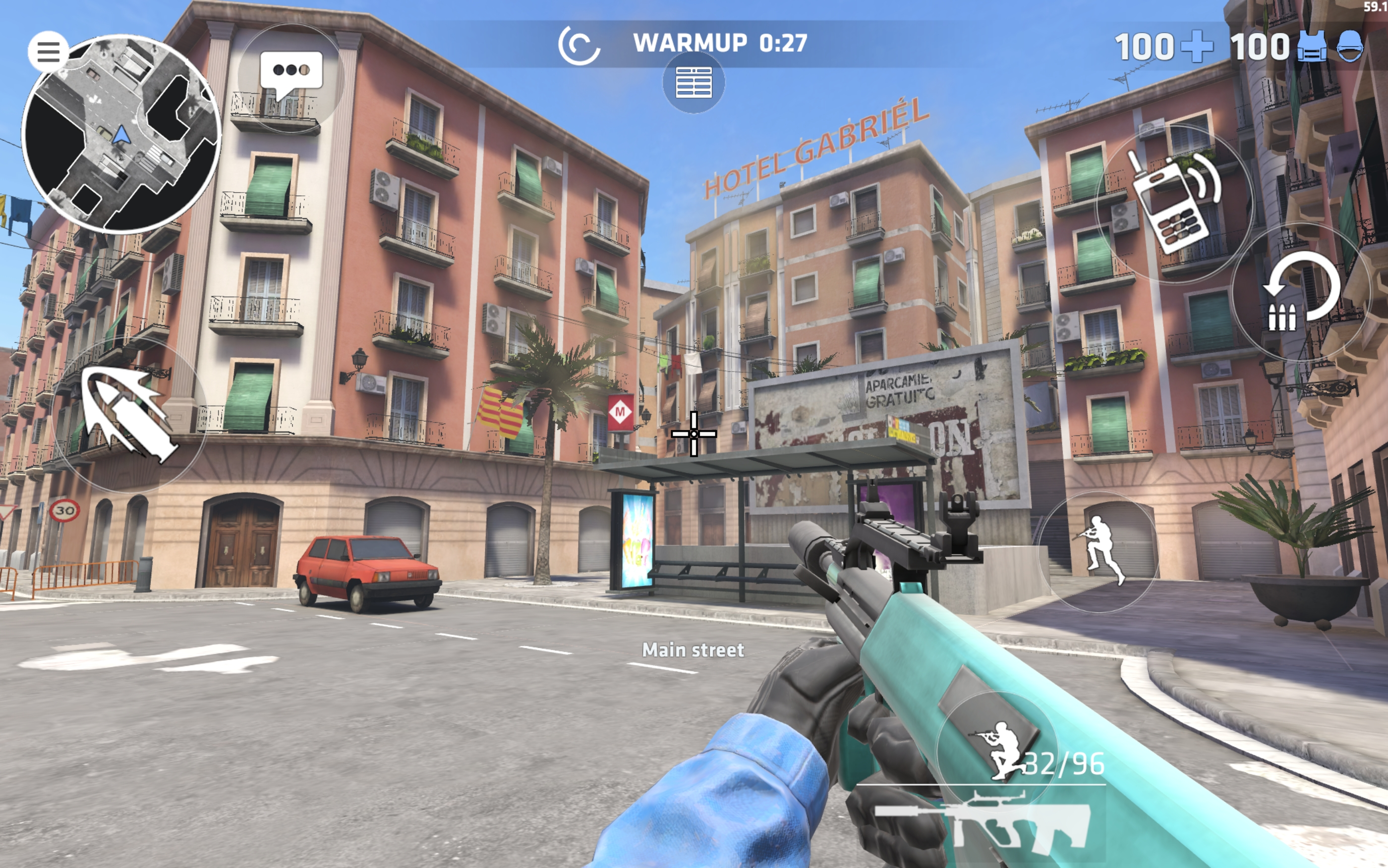
The Barcelona-like map "Plaza"

== Esports ==
Critical Ops is known also for its official tournament modes, where professional players sign up and participate in tournaments such as Mobile E-Sports Tournament, Polaris Tournament, Golden Ox Tournament, Worlds 2024, Globals 2024. These Tournaments are hosted by Moderators or Tournament Organisers where 5 Clan Members (from the same clan) compete against 5 other clan members where the first team to reach 13 rounds wins. There are 1st, 2nd and 3rd place positions where each earn rewards such as money or special tournament skins for example the 1st place team earn Golden Gloves for the best player in the tournament. Some Notable Clans include [E8] Team Elevate, [RGN] Reign, [S2] Invictus, [EXCL] Exclusive and [GS] Gankstars.

=== International Tournaments ===
Year	Tournament	Host	Champions		Results	Runner Up		Third Place	Fourth Place	No. of Teams	Prize Pool
Year	Tournament	Host	Region	Team	Results	Team	Region	Third Place	Fourth Place	No. of Teams	Prize Pool
2017	ESL C-OPS Championship Series	Online	United States	Gankstars	n/a - n/a	SetToDestroyX	EU	Kings Uprising	Imperial	4	$10.000
2018	Amazon Mobile Masters	Seattle	United States	Gankstars	2 - 0	Hammers Esports	United States	NOVA Esports	CsPG	6	$40.000
2022	Critical Ops World Championship	Online	CIS	REIGN	4 - 2	Evil Vision	Brazil	Crossfire	Xenocide	16	$25.000
2023	Critical Ops World Championship	Online	CIS	REIGN	4 - 3	Mullet Mafia	EU	Underestimated & Evil Vision		8	$25.000
2024	Critical Ops World Championship	Online	CIS	REIGN	4 - 2	Invictus	EU	No Mercy & Evil Vision		6	$25.000

== Events ==
Critical Ops offers in game events that match with the current season that it is, for example in March–May the game offers the Spring Event where the game is spring based with Spring Cases (Special Event Cases). Around June–July the game offers the Summer Event where players can purchase Summer Cases which contain things such as summer themed weapon skins and Gloves. In around August- September the game offers the Autumn Event where players can purchase Autumn Cases which contain Autumn themed skins. In Around October the game features the Halloween Event where temporary game modes such as Manhunt are available to play and the game offers Halloween Event Cases where it contains Halloween themed skins. In around December the game features the Winter Event where it features Winter Cases where you can purchase Christmas themed skins.
