= Osaka Business Park =

Business district in Osaka, Japan

Coordinates: 34.6919°N 135.5291°E

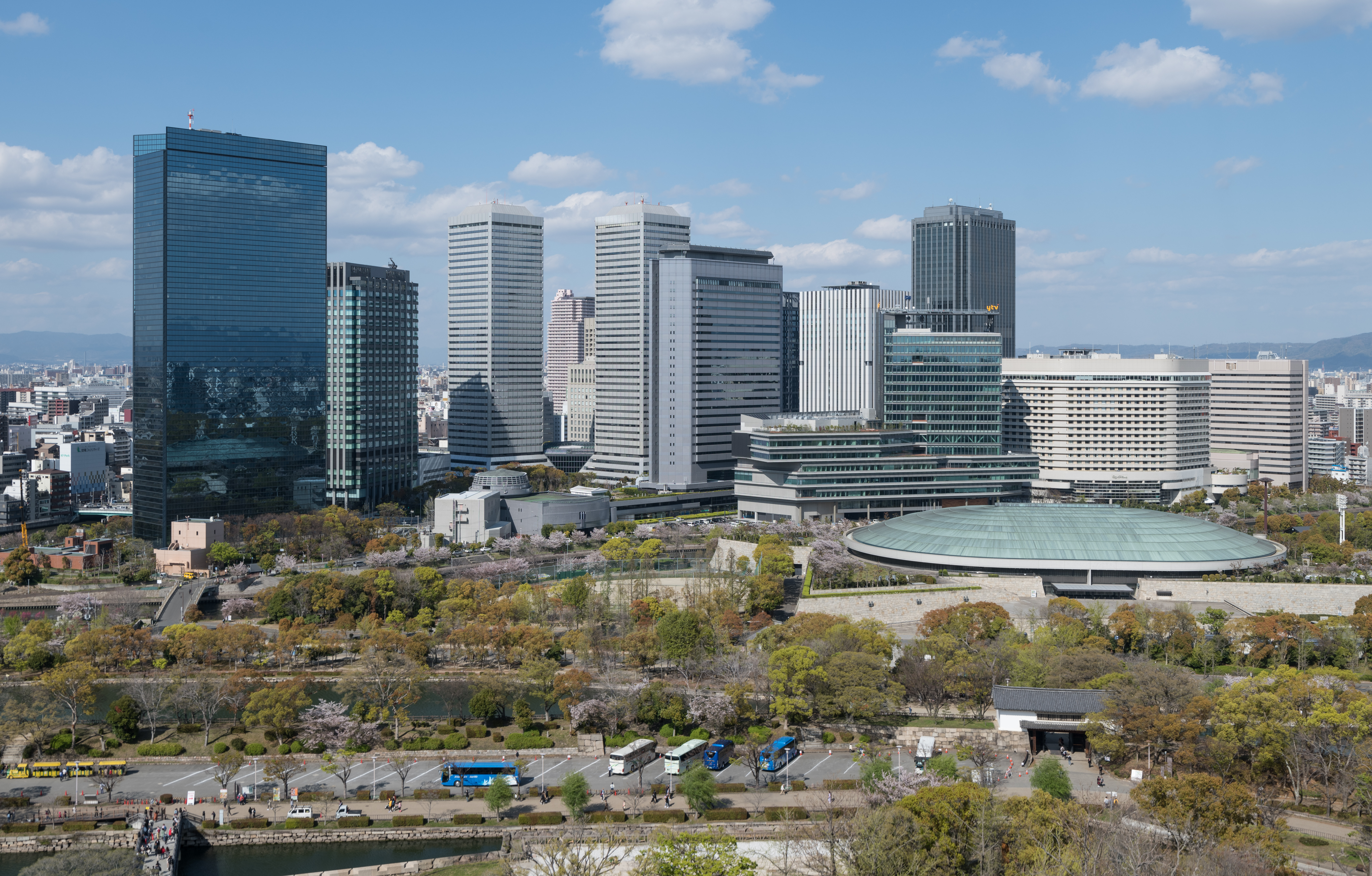
Skyline

Osaka Business Park (大阪ビジネスパーク, Ōsaka Bijinesu Pāku; OBP) is a business district of Chūō-ku, Osaka, Japan. The area spans 26 hectares (64 acres) northeast of Osaka Castle Park, and is bordered by the Neyagawa and Daini-Neyagawa rivers. Formerly an island known as Benten-jima, the area was redeveloped with private sector investment of ¥350 billion from 11 companies, and opened for business in 1986. Prominent skyscrapers in OBP include the Matsushita IMP Building and the Twin 21 office towers.
