= Hangame =

South Korean online game portal

- Homepage layout Homepage as of April 7, 2025
- Website type: Online game portal
- Available in: Korean, Japanese
- Owner: NHN Corporation
- Website: https://www.hangame.com, https://www.hange.jp
- Commercial: Yes
- Registration: Required
- Launched: December 1999
- Current status: Online
- Content license: Copyrighted

Hangame (Korean: 한게임) (also known as Hange (Japanese: ハンゲ) and formerly known as NHN Hangame (Japanese: NHNハンゲーム) in Japan) is a popular South Korean online game portal operated by NHN Corporation. Launched in December 1999, Hangame offers casual, first-person shooter, MMORPGs, sports, and other genres. With over 20 million members and a peak concurrent user base of 290,000 in South Korea, it is the country's largest game portal. Hangame also has affiliates in Japan (NHN PlayArt). It also offers channeling and publishing services for many popular online games.

== History ==
Hangame was launched in December 1999 as the online game service of Hangame Communications. It changed its name to NHN in September 2001. In 2000, Hangame entered the Japanese online market with Hangame, Japan. The following year, Hangame became an online game publisher. In 2003, mobile games were also started to be offered by Hangame. In 2004, it moved into the Chinese market with Ourgame, a joint venture company with Sea Rainbow Holdings Corp., but discontinued the service in October 2010. In 2007, it entered the U.S. market with the launch of the English service ijji.com but sold the stake of ijji.com in December 2011. In June 2012 NHN created a strategic partnership with InnoSpark for global publishing of smartphone games. In August 2013 NHN was re-split into NHN Entertainment Corporation and Naver Corporation for strategic reasons and Hangame is currently serviced by NHN Entertainment.

== Features ==
Hangame provides both casual titles, like board games and card games, as well as hard-core games like first-person shooters and massively multi-player online role-playing games. All games offer the use of avatars and community services, allowing players to interact with each other. Many games also offer in-game items - such as clothing, armor, and weapons - that can be purchased for a small fee. Hangame offers both for-fee and free-to-play games.

== Toast.com ==
Toast.com is the international game web portal for NHN Entertainment Corporation's mobile games. The web portal was created during its expansion to the United States in 2013 and is updated regularly when new mobile games get released either in "Soft Launch" or Global Launch. Toast.com is considered to be the new branding name for NHN Entertainment Corporation's mobile game division as they expand beyond its Hangame web game portal outside of the South Korean market.

The Toast.com portal acts as a base ecosystem to present its mobile games, community and pre-registration events, multimedia, and art assets, while acting as redirect to its licensed mobile games both on the Apple iTunes App Store and Google Play app store.

As of 2015, 16 mobile games are present either on the Apple IOS application or on Google's Android application.

== Published works ==
Year	Title	Platform(s)	Developer(s)	Ref.
2000	Hangame Poker	Microsoft Windows	NHN Entertainment	
2006	Ernis & Fricky	Microsoft Windows	ActozSoft	
2008	Hangame Baduk & Omok	Microsoft Windows	NHN Entertainment	

== See also ==
- Ijji
