= NHN Corporation =

South Korean technology company

- Native name: 주식회사 엔에이치엔
- Type: Public
- Traded as: KRX: 181710
- Industry: Online game portal
- Predecessor: the first iteration of NHN (now Naver Corporation)
- Founded: December 1999; 26 years ago (as Hangame Communications, Inc.); 1 August 2013 (as NHN Entertainment Corporation)
- Headquarters: Seongnam, South Korea
- Area served: Worldwide
- Key people: Lee Jun-ho (Chairman); Jeong Woo-jin (CEO); Ahn Hyun-sik (CFO)
- Revenue: ▲ ₩2.52 trillion (US$2.2 billion) (2025)
- Net income: ▲ ₩1.95 trillion (US$1.71 billion) (2025)
- Total assets: ▲ ₩3.85 trillion (US$3.37 billion) (2025)
- Total equity: ▲ ₩1.77 trillion (US$1.55 billion) (2025)
- Owners: Lee Jun-ho (29.65%); JLC Co., Ltd. (10.23%); JLC Partners Co., Ltd. (9.16%); National Pension Service (7.16%)
- Number of employees: 904 (2025)
- Subsidiaries: NHN Japan Corporation
- Website: nhn.com

NHN Corporation (Korean: 주식회사 엔에이치엔) is a South Korean information technology and online gaming company headquartered in Seongnam, South Korea. Founded in 1999 as Hangame Communications, the company originally operated the online game portal Hangame, one of the earliest and most popular web-based gaming platforms in South Korea.

NHN was formerly part of the original NHN, a company formed through the merger of Hangame and Naver in 2000. Following a corporate restructuring in 2013, the online search and internet platform business was separated into Naver Corporation, while the remaining game and entertainment business was renamed NHN Entertainment. The company adopted its current name, NHN Corporation, in 2019.

The company operates a wide range of businesses including online and mobile games, payment services, cloud computing, e-commerce, content distribution, and technology infrastructure. Its subsidiaries and affiliated services include NHN PlayArt, NHN Cloud, NHN Payco, and Comico.

== History ==
It was founded in December 1999 under the name Hangame Communications, Inc. In July 2000, Hangame Communications officially merged with South Korea's largest search engine company, Naver. Upon the merger, the name of the company was changed to "Next Human Network", or NHN, although the two divisions continue to operate under their original brand names. On 1 August 2013, NHN was re-split into NHN Entertainment Corporation and Naver Corporation for strategic reasons. On 1 April 2019, the company name was changed to NHN again.

NHN has been focusing on cloud services since 2014. It launched the brand TOAST Cloud in 2014 and built its own IDC center in 2015. TOAST Cloud provides cloud services.

== Games ==
Title	Year	Platform(s)	Genre
Fish Island	2012	iOS, Android	Sports
Fish Friends	2012	iOS, Android	Sports
Wooparoo Mountain	2012	iOS, Android	Social
LINE POP	2012	iOS, Android	Puzzle
LINE Dozer	2013	iOS, Android	Coin Pusher
Crusaders Quest	2014	iOS, Android	MMORPG
RWBY: Amity Arena	2018	iOS, Android	Tower defense
Dr. Mario World	2019	iOS, Android	Puzzle
Critical Ops: Reloaded	2019	iOS, Android	FPS
Darkest Days	2025	iOS, Android, Steam, Epic Games	Zombie RPG shooter
Abyssdia	2025	iOS, Android	RPG

== Studios and subsidiaries ==
- NHN Bigfoot
- NHN PixelCube
- NHN Japan Corporation
- NHN Israel
- NHN Global
- NHN Singapore
- NHN Investment
- NHN Bugs Corporation (formerly Neowiz Internet Corporation, acquired from Neowiz Holdings in 2015), which trades under the Bugs! Brand (often stylized as SUPER SOUND Bugs!) held a 15% share of South Korea's music streaming market at the end of 2016, according to an IFPI survey of Internet users.
  - JPlanet Entertainment (formerly JJ Holic Media)
  - How Entertainment
