= List of Gunslinger Girl chapters =

Cover of the first volume of Gunslinger Girl, as published by ASCII Media Works in Japan on May 21, 2002.

Gunslinger Girl is a manga series written and illustrated by Yu Aida. It first premiered in Japan on May 21, 2002, in the monthly Dengeki Daioh magazine and completed its run with the 100th chapter with the September 2012 issue. The chapters are also being published in collected volumes by ASCII Media Works, with the first volume released November 27, 2002. Fourteen volumes have been published in Japan as of December 11, 2011. The manga ended with the release of the 100th chapter. These final chapters were collected in a fifteenth volume released on December 17, 2012.

When ADV Manga was formed in 2003, the Gunslinger Girl manga series was one of the first titles the new branch of ADV Films licensed for an English language release in North America. The first volume was released on November 18, 2003, with the next two volumes not released until 2005. At the 2005 AnimeNEXT convention, the ADV representative David L. Williams said the slow schedule was due to ADV Manga feeling the market was too saturated with new manga titles at the time and that they had rushed into the manga market. However, after the third volume was released that year, the series went on a two-year hiatus. The series was restarted in July 2007 with the publication of the fourth volume, and six volumes were released through April 2008. On April 8, 2010, manga publisher Seven Seas Entertainment announced that it has licensed Gunslinger Girl and will be re-released, with a new translation and in an omnibus format.

== Volume list ==
No.	Original release date	Original ISBN	English release date	English ISBN
1	November 27, 2002	978-4-8402-2237-2	November 18, 2003	978-1-4139-0020-0 (ADV); 978-1-934876-92-3 (Seven Seas)
Chapter 1: "Observing the Heavens" (天体観測, "Tentaikansoku"); Chapter 2: "Love Thy Neighbor"; Chapter 3: "The Snow White"; Chapter 4: "The Death of Elsa de Sica (Part 1)" (エルザ·デ·シーカの死(前編), "Eruza de Sīka no Shi (Zenpen)"); Chapter 5: "The Death of Elsa de Sica (Part 2)" (エルザ·デ·シーカの死(後編), "Eruza de Sīka no Shi (Kōhen)")
Henrietta, a combat cyborg working for a secret Italian intelligence agency, and her handler Jose attack a Five Republics terrorist safe house, supported by Giuse's brother Jean and his cyborg, Rico. In Naples, the cyborg Triela and her handler Hilshire are searching for a Mafia turncoat who wants to turn state's evidence. The SWA suffers their first casualties when a cyborg and her handler are found dead in a public park.
2	June 27, 2003	978-4-8402-2421-5	March 22, 2005	978-1-4139-0233-4 (ADV); 978-1-934876-92-3 (Seven Seas)
Chapter 6: "Vegetable Gardens"; Chapter 7: "Ice Cream in the Piazza di Spagna"; Chapter 8: "Song of Joy" (歓びの歌, "Yorokobi no Uta"); Chapter 9: "How Beautiful My Florence is!"; Chapter 10: "Prince of the Land of Pasta (Part 1)" (パスタの国の王子様(前編), "Pasuta no Kuni no Ōjisama (Zenpen)"); Chapter 11: "Prince of the Land of Pasta (Part 2))" (パスタの国の王子様(後編), "Pasuta no Kuni no Ōjisama (Kōhen)")
While she is alone now, Claes was once partnered with a handler. The Five Republics Faction plots to bomb the Piazza di Spagna in Rome, but their haste allows the SWA to respond in time. Jean and Rico travel to Florence to save the life of an accountant with information that can bring down a billionaire who is financing the Five Republics Faction's operations. The story of the first cyborg, Angelica, is revealed.
3	February 27, 2004	978-4-8402-2622-6	June 6, 2005	978-1-4139-0274-7 (ADV); 978-1-934876-92-3 (Seven Seas)
Chapter 12: "Kaleidoscope"; Chapter 13: "Pinocchio" (ピノッキオ, "Pinokkio") (Part 1); Chapter 14: "Pinocchio" (ピノッキオ, "Pinokkio") (Part 2); Chapter 15: "Pinocchio" (ピノッキオ, "Pinokkio") (Part 3); Chapter 16: "Breaking the Chains of Retaliation"; Chapter 17: "Retiring Tibetan Terrier"
Henrietta finds a kaleidoscope that Jose has purchased for her as a gift, but misinterprets who it is for. Pinocchio and his sponsor, Christiano Savonarola make their appearances and Triela and Hilshire travel to Montalcino to follow up on a Public Safety operative shadowing Pinocchio there. They mount an assault on the house where Pinocchio, Franco, and Franca are, but the three escape. Marco and Angelica are in Milan following their own leads and the SWA has to protect the chairwoman of the Strait of Massina Bridge project from an assassination attempt.
4	October 27, 2004	978-4-8402-2819-0	June 20, 2007	978-1-4139-0341-6 (ADV); 978-1-934876-97-8 (Seven Seas)
Chapter 18: "Tiny Joy, Tearless Grief"; Chapter 19: "Mimi Machiavelli" (ミミ·マキャヴェリ, "Mimi Makyaveri"); Chapter 20: "Tosca" (トスカ, "Tosuka"); Chapter 21: "Clever Serpents, Innocent Doves" (「賢い蛇, 純真な鳩」, "Kashikoi Hebi, Junshin na Hato"); Chapter 22: "She is a Flower that Blossoms in honesty's light"
Claes experiences a normal day, though events result in some abnormal reactions. Triela deals with her loss to Pinocchio and makes a surprising new friend in Naples. A first generation cyborg, Beatrice, and her handler, Bernardo, help the SWA eliminate a rogue military group smuggling weapons to the terrorists.
5	May 27, 2005	978-4-8402-3072-8	August 22, 2007	978-1-4139-0346-1 (ADV); 978-1-934876-97-8 (Seven Seas)
Chapter 23: "Evanescence" (泡沫, "Utakata"); Chapter 24: "Caterina" (カテリーナ, "Katerīna"); Chapter 25: "Pinocchio" (ピノッキオ, "Pinokkio") (Part 4); Chapter 26: "Pinocchio" (ピノッキオ, "Pinokkio") (Part 5); Chapter 27: "Pinocchio" (ピノッキオ, "Pinokkio") (Part 6)
Marco's ex-girlfriend Patricia launches an investigation into the truth behind the Social Welfare Agency with a colleague. Franca is captured by Public Safety, but is rescued by Franco and Pinocchio. Jose and Henrietta arrive at the location where they were holding Franca to find their comrades dead. Franco, Franca, and Pinocchio escape to Franca's farm in Frascati and Pinocchio returns to the home of Christiano Savonarola just before the SWA launches an operation to arrest him. While Triela gets her revenge on Pinocchio, Franco, Franca, and Christiano make a break for it.
6	December 17, 2005	978-4-8402-3290-6	November 28, 2007	978-1-4139-0352-2 (ADV); 978-1-934876-97-8 (Seven Seas)
Chapter 28: "Dum Spiro, Spero"; Chapter 29: "Fantasma"; Chapter 30: "Reincarnation"; Chapter 31: "The Bolshoi Ballet Academy" (ボリショイ·バレエ学校, "Borishoi Baree Gakkō"); Chapter 32: "Line of Sight" (視線, "Shisen")
Jean visits the grave of his fiancé. Later, Jean and Jose vacation at their villa in Sicily where Jean dreams of their dead younger sister. The first second generation cyborg, Petrushka, is introduced, along with her handler Alessandro.
7	July 27, 2006	978-4-8402-3532-7	October 25, 2011	978-1-935934-22-6 (Seven Seas)
Chapter 33: "The Girl's Miniature Garden" (彼女の箱庭, "Kanojo no Hakoniwa"); Chapter 34: "Promise" (約束, "Yakusoku"); Chapter 35: "Lingering Hope"; Chapter 36: "The Sheep and the Goats"; Chapter 37: "The Hero is Afraid" (勇者は恐れず, "Yūsha wa Osorezu")
Claes takes Petrushka around the Agency compound, but when Petrushka puts on Claes' glasses, Claes does not respond well. Claes is allowed to leave the compound on "vacation" to Lake Maggiore on the Italian-Swiss border. However, two bomb smugglers are detected trying to escape to Switzerland and Claes and Petrushka are sent to stop them. The people caught in Lake Maggiore were trying to kill the prosecutor trying the case of the people who killed Jean and Giuse's family. Triela and Hilshire join Petrushka and Alessandro as Prosecutor Guellfi's protective detail and must try and prevent an attempt on her life.
8	March 27, 2007	978-4-8402-3826-7	October 25, 2011	978-1-935934-22-6 (Seven Seas)
Chapter 38: "Dance of the Black Swan" (黒鳥の舞, "Kokuchou no Mai"); Chapter 39: "Lady Rosso" (レディ·ロッソ, "Redi Rosso"; rosso is Italian for "red") (Part 1); Chapter 40: "Lady Rosso" (レディ·ロッソ, "Redi Rosso") (Part 2); Chapter 41: "Lady Rosso" (レディ·ロッソ, "Redi Rosso") (Part 3); Chapter 42: "Mind Speech" (マインド·スピーチ, "Maindo Supīchi"); Chapter 43: "Lady Rosso" (レディ·ロッソ, "Redi Rosso") (Part 4); Chapter 44: "Lady Rosso" (レディ·ロッソ, "Redi Rosso") (Part 5)
Alessandro's past before he joined Section 2 is explored, including his recruitment into Italian Intelligence by the spy Rossana and his relationship with her. Alessandro sees Rosanna for the first time in almost four years and he learns she has a daughter by a northern separatist. They extricate Rosanna and her daughter before the separatists can kidnap or kill them. Alessandro invites Petrushka back to his apartment and she confesses her love for him.
9	November 27, 2007	978-4-8402-4108-3	March 13, 2012	978-1-935934-14-1 (Seven Seas)
Chapter 45: "Crepuscolo" (クレプスコロ, "Kurepusukoro"; crepuscolo is Italian for "twilight") (Part 1); Chapter 46: "Crepuscolo" (クレプスコロ, "Kurepusukoro") (Part 2); Chapter 47: "Crepuscolo" (クレプスコロ, "Kurepusukoro") (Part 3); Chapter 48: "Crepuscolo" (クレプスコロ, "Kurepusukoro") (Part 4); Chapter 49: "Three Hugs" (3つの抱擁, "Mittsuno Hōyō"); Chapter 50: "Two Thoughts" (2つの想い, "Futatsuno Omoi")
Angelica begins to see her old dog, Perro, and has dreams of a time before she came to the Agency, though she has a difficult time remembering recent events. She accompanies Marco into Rome as the fratelli search for a bomb threat. A truck bomb is driven into the Ministry of the Interior and Angelica shields Marco from the blast. While the doctors were able to repair Angelica's physical injuries, the mental damage from years of surgery and conditioning has finally accrued to a level that will soon prove fatal. Angelica, who now only remembers her life before her arrival at the Agency, tells Marco a story about a prince who lived in the Land of Pasta. As the rest of the girls watch the start of a meteor shower, Angelica quietly passes away, Marco by her side to the end. Triela finds that her own memory is starting to fail her. She accompanies Hilshire on a mission to Naples and is slightly injured. While she feels such a risk is normal for a cyborg to face, after the death of Angelica, Hilshire starts to realize that the cyborgs, for all their abilities, are still mortal.
10	October 27, 2008	978-4-04-867432-4	March 13, 2012	978-1-935934-14-1 (Seven Seas)
Chapter 51: "Light" (灯, "Tomoshibi"); Chapter 52: "Assassination Mission" (暗殺任務, "Ansatsu Ninmu"); Chapter 53: "Reunion" (再会, "Saikai"); Chapter 54: "Confession" (告白, "Kokuhaku"); Chapter 55: "A Flower of Good Will" (善意の花, "Zen'i no Hana"); Chapter 56: "Returning to the Birdcage" (鳥籠に還る, "Torikago ni Kaeru"); Chapter 57: "Vendetta" (ヴェンデッタ); Chapter 58: "Vendetta" (ヴェンデッタ) (Part 2)
The death of Angelica hits the handlers harder than the cyborgs, as they come to realize their charges are mortal. Triela chafes under Hilshire's desire to keep her from harm, since she believes her purpose is to protect him. They return to Naples to see Mario Bossi, and Triela learns the truth of what brought her to the SWA and the sacrifices Hilshire made for her in doing so. When he leaves her behind on a mission and is injured, she is torn between conflicting emotions of fear and love, especially as she feels her own life will end soon. For Christmas, Jose takes Henrietta to the opera, but she is frightened by her inability to remember what they had done the previous Christmas. On New Year's Day, Alessandro and Petrushka trail Aaron Cicero, a person of interest in the killings of the prosecutors who are trying the terrorists that killed the Croce brothers' family in a bomb attack some five years prior. Jean, Giuse, Rico, and Henrietta capture Cicero and learn that the person who led the killings is back in Italy and planning to bomb Fiumicino Airport.
11	July 27, 2009	978-4-04-867977-0	September 4, 2012	978-1-935934-83-7 (Seven Seas)
Chapter 59: "A Caged Memory" (記憶の檻, "Kioku no Ori"); Chapter 60: "Vendetta" (ヴェンデッタ) (Part 3); Chapter 61: "Vendetta" (ヴェンデッタ) (Part 4); Chapter 62: "Vendetta" (ヴェンデッタ) (Part 5); Chapter 63: "Beatrice" (べアトリーチェ); Chapter 64: "Battlefield of the Vanquished" (敗者の戦場, "Haisha no Senjō"); Chapter 65: "Welcome Home, Enrica" (おかえりエンリカ, "Okaeri Enrika"); Chapter 66: "The Blue Prince" (青色の王子, "Aoi no Ōji")
As winter continues, Claes and Beatrice move herbs inside to protect them from the cold while the Medical Staff develop a new form of conditioning which they hope will not be so hard on the girls' brains. Also, a new skin implantation process has been acquired via a technology swap with the United States. However, all these new treatments have almost exhausted the SWA's budget. While undergoing the new treatments, Henrietta dreams of the attack on her family that sent her to the SWA. Giacomo Dante, an infamous terrorist and the one responsible for killing the Croce brothers' family, returns from exile to take control of the Five Republics movement. He demands the release of Aaron Cicero and other imprisoned terrorists and places a cruise missile warhead in the Bell Tower of St. Mark's Basilica in Venice, which he threatens to detonate if his demands are not met. The SWA and GIS arrive in force and storm the tower, but Giacomo is ready for them and both sides take heavy casualties in the attack, though the Bell Tower is saved from destruction. As the SWA recovers from the events of Venice, the past of Enrica Croce, Giuse and Jean's little sister and Sophia Durante, Jean's fiancee is revealed.
12	April 27, 2010	978-4-04-868567-2	September 4, 2012	978-1-935934-83-7 (Seven Seas)
Chapter 67: "A New Family" (新しい家族, "Atarashii Kazoku"); Chapter 68: "The Croce Affair" (クローチェ事件, "Kurōche Jiken") (Part 1); Chapter 69: "The Croce Affair" (クローチェ事件, "Kurōche Jiken") (Part 2); Chapter 70: "The Croce Affair" (クローチェ事件, "Kurōche Jiken") (Part 3); Chapter 71: "The Croce Affair" (クローチェ事件, "Kurōche Jiken") (Part 4); Chapter 72: "Fantasma (Part 2)"; Chapter 73: "Addio"
The past of Enrica and Sophia continues including Jose's peacekeeping duty in the Balkans before beings sent home, Jean's engagement to Sophia and Enrica accepting Sophia as her future sister-in-law. How Dante was involved in the bombing that killed Enrica, Sophia and the Croce brothers parents is also revealed which what lead the brothers joining the SWA. Back in the present, the repercussions of Dante's attack on Venice has an effect on both sides. Henrietta's deteriorating condition requires a dangerous treatment which a cold hearted Jose approves and Dante visits a crippled Cristiano, who wants revenge against the SWA for the deaths of Franco, Franca and Pinocchio.
13	April 27, 2011	978-4-04-870412-0	January 8, 2013	978-1-937867-07-2 (Seven Seas)
Chapter 74: "Soldato"; Chapter 75: "Testament" (遺言, "Yuigon"); Chapter 76: "Nuclear Plant Occupation" (原発占拠, "Genpatsu Senkyo"); Chapter 77: "The Nature"; Chapter 78: "Occaso, Part 1" (オッカーゾ, "Okkazo"); Chapter 79: "Occaso, Part 2" (オッカーゾ, "Okkazo"); Chapter 80: "Occaso, Part 3" (オッカーゾ, "Okkazo"); Chapter 81: "Occaso, Part 4" (オッカーゾ, "Okkazo"); Chapter 82: "Orion" (オリオン, "Orion")
Hilshire and Roberta Guellfi are now in a relationship. The Venice mission brings the various factions of the Five Republics movement together under Dante's banner. Using the other cruise missile warheads, they attack multiple Italian cities and then take over a nuclear power plant outside of Turin and demand that the government dismantle the Social Welfare Agency. The Prime Minister launches an attack to recover the plant with the handlers and cyborgs of Section 2 leading the charge. Note: Occaso is Italian for "sunset".
14	December 17, 2011	978-4-04-886173-1	January 8, 2013	978-1-937867-07-2 (Seven Seas)
Chapter 83: "Salvation" (救い, "Sukui"); Chapter 84: "A Chance Meeting with the Past" (過去との邂逅, "Kako to no Kaikou"); Chapter 85: "Erinyes, Part 1" (エリニュエス, "Erinyuesu"); Chapter 86: "Erinyes, Part 2" (エリニュエス, "Erinyuesu"); Chapter 87: "Erinyes, Part 3" (エリニュエス, "Erinyuesu"); Chapter 88: "Horatius, Part 1" (ホラティウス, "Horatiusu"); Chapter 89: "Horatius, Part 2" (ホラティウス, "Horatiusu"); Chapter 90: "Erinyes, Part 4" (エリニュエス, "Erinyuesu")
Spec-Op Sections 1 and 2 assault the New Turin Nuclear Plant against the Dante's Padanian terrorist leading to heavy casualties on both sides: Triela and Hilshire are killed in combat, Henrietta accidentally shoots Jose who then asks her to fulfill their suicide pact, Jean is shot by Rico on his orders after being taken hostage by Dante who then himself is seriously wounded and captured later on. Despite the heavily casualties the mission is a success and the Padania finally defeated.
15	December 17, 2012	978-4-04-891074-3	July 2, 2013	978-1-937867-28-7 (Seven Seas)
Chapter 91: "Ray of Twilight, Part 1" (薄明光線, "Hakumei Kousen"); Chapter 92: "Ray of Twilight, Part 2" (薄明光線, "Hakumei Kousen"); Chapter 93: "Ray of Twilight, Part 3" (薄明光線, "Hakumei Kousen"); Chapter 94: "Ray of Twilight, Part 4" (薄明光線, "Hakumei Kousen"); Chapter 95: "Survivors" (生還者, "Seikanja"); Chapter 96: "The Dying Swan, Part 1"; Chapter 97: "The Dying Swan, Part 2"; Chapter 98: "Hartmann's Letter" (ハルトマンの手紙, "Harutoman no Tegami"); Chapter 99: "The End of Winter" (杪冬, "Mio Fuyu"); Vol. 15 Bonus Chapter: "Epilogue" (エピローグ, "Epirōgu"); Chapter 100: "The Hope"
With Dante taken down, the Italian Government believes that the Social Welfare Agency has seen too much and is now a threat. With new orders from the Government, troops move in on the SWA at the Turin Power Plant, securing Dante. Meanwhile, another detachment prepares to raid the SWA headquarters, and demands that the SWA staffers stand down. Pope John XXIV addresses a crowd at Saint Peter's Square asking for the violence to stop and the recovery operation begins at New Trino. With Padania defeated, it is time for the Social Welfare Agency to come to an end.

== See also ==
- List of Gunslinger Girl characters
- List of Gunslinger Girl episodes
