= List of Gunslinger Girl episodes =

The cover art of the DVD collection released by Funimation

The episodes of the anime series Gunslinger Girl are based on the Gunslinger Girl manga series written and illustrated by Yu Aida. There are a total of twenty-eight episodes split over two seasons/series. Set in modern-day Italy, the series revolves around the Social Welfare Agency, a government-funded organisation which is supposed to provide advanced medical care to those in need. This, however, is a cover for a far different agenda: the patients, adolescent girls who have survived traumatic events, are brainwashed into forgetting their past, turned into cyborgs, trained in the use of weapons and used as assassins to battle enemies of the State. Each girl is assigned to an adult whose job is to provide the girl with training and act as a mentor and authority figure. The relationship between the cyborg-girls and their "handlers" forms the basis of much of the plot and varies from the affectionate to the indifferent with varying degrees of results.

The first series' episodes were directed by Morio Asaka, animated by Madhouse and produced by Bandai Visual, Marvelous Entertainment, MediaWorks, and Madhouse. It adapts the first two manga volumes of the series over thirteen episodes which aired in Japan from October 9, 2003 to February 19, 2004, on Bandai Channel and Fuji Television. Set in contemporary Italy, the series tells about young girls who are turned into cyborgs, trained as assassins by adult male "handlers" and their missions against terrorists and gangsters on behalf of a secretive government agency. A sequel called Gunslinger Girl -Il Teatrino-, directed by Hiroshi Ishiodori and animated by Artland, aired in Japan on Tokyo MX TV from January 8, 2008 to April 1, 2008. It adapts the third, fourth and fifth volumes of the manga over fifteen episodes, with thirteen episodes airing on television and the final two released directly to DVD.

== Production ==
The series is licensed for English adaptation by Funimation. The English dub of the anime aired in the United States on the Independent Film Channel. A single DVD box collection, containing all thirteen episodes of the first series, was released in Japan by Marvelous Entertainment on March 10, 2005. Funimation has released three DVD compilations of the English adaptation of the series, with the first compilation containing the first five episodes, with four episodes in the other two compilations. The first compilation was released on May 17, 2005, the second on July 12, 2005, and the third on September 6, 2005. Funimation has additionally released a collection box containing all three compilations; it was released on December 11, 2007. The episode titles of both the English and Japanese adaptations are given in Italian, with the corresponding kanji preceding the Italian title in the latter. A DVD compilation of the second season, containing the first episode of the anime, was released by Media Factory on March 25, 2008. Funimation has licensed the second season and is streaming the English subtitled episodes on their website as well as on Veoh, promising a Region 1 retail release in 2009. Unlike the first season of the series, which mixed Italian with the Japanese kanji in the titles, Il Teatrino's titles are pure Japanese.

Two pieces of theme music are used for the first series; one opening theme and one ending theme. The opening theme is "The Light Before We Land" by The Delgados, and the ending theme is "Dopo il Sogno 〜Yume no Ato ni〜" (Dopo il Sogno 〜夢のあとに〜; lit. After the dream 〜After the dream〜) by Yoshitaka Kitanami. Gunslinger Girl -Il Teatrino- also uses four pieces of theme music. The opening theme is "Tatta Hitotsu no Omoi" (たった1つの想い) by Kokia, and the main closing theme is "doll" sung by Aoi Tada (ep. 1–5, 10, 12) or Lia (ep. 6–7, 9, 11, and ova) and written and composed by Jun Maeda. The closing theme was replaced by "Scarborough Fair" (by Aoi Tada) for episode 8 and "human" (by Lia) for episode 13.

== Episode list ==
=== Gunslinger Girl ===
No.	Title	Original release date	English release date
1	"Fratello (Siblings)"; Transliteration: "Kyōdai – fratello -" (Japanese: 兄妹 – fratello -)	October 9, 2003	January 5, 2007
Henrietta and her "handler", Jose, members of Section Two of the Social Welfare Agency, which handles covert government actions, are ordered to a site to acquire a witness. In a flashback, Jose recalls how he found Henrietta in a hospital after her family had been killed. He had her nursed back to health, fitted with cybernetics, and trained to be an assassin. In the present, he approaches the armed group surrounding the witness, but one of the men's threats against him causes Henrietta to start viciously attacking, and she dispatches the men inside the room. Jose reprimands her for this, as their mission is a failure, although the witness is later found outside the building. Back at base, Henrietta is comforted by two of her counterparts, Triela and Claes.
2	"Orione (Orion)"; Transliteration: "Tentai Kansoku – orione -" (Japanese: 天体観測 – orione -)	October 16, 2003	January 12, 2007
Henrietta is treated for her injury, although the doctor warns that repeated surgeries would weaken her body. Jose then recalls how he needed to teach her manners, and during her training, attempted to treat her as a young girl rather than simply a killing machine. After Henrietta finishes tea with Triela and Claes, who are supportive of her despite her mission's failure, Jose gives her a coat and asks her to join him on top of the main building. Once there, he shows Henrietta the stars through a telescope for the first time, noting that he wanted her to look upon the sky with something other than a rifle scope.
3	"Ragazzo (Boy)"; Transliteration: "Shōnen – ragazzo -" (Japanese: 少年 – ragazzo -)	October 30, 2003	January 19, 2007
Rico, another of the young assassin girls, recalls her finding by her handler, Jean, and how she was able to move thanks to the cybernetics she received. In the present, she is assigned on a mission to assassinate a politician, and in a preliminary run through the building, meets a boy named Emilio. She is unsure of how to react to him, but afterward, she asks Henrietta to teach her how to play the violin since Emilio asked her to. During the mission, Rico succeeds in killing the politician, but encounters Emilio, and is forced to kill him to preserve the mission's secrecy.
4	"Bambola (Doll)"; Transliteration: "Ningyō – bambola -" (Japanese: 人形 – bambola -)	November 13, 2003	January 26, 2007
With Christmas coming, Henrietta asks Jose to stay with her as her Christmas present. While on a mission, Triela shoots a suspect against the orders of her handler, Hilshire. At base, she mulls over the fact that Hilshire always gives her the same Christmas presents. They are then sent on a mission to apprehend Mario Bosh, a retired Mafia leader. They succeed in finding him, but he manages to escape. As he is about to be killed by the Mafia, Triela saves him, and allows him to leave to be with his daughter. Overhearing this, Hilshire asks her what she wants for Christmas, and she asks for another bear. On Christmas day, however, she receives a present from Mario as well.
5	"Promessa (Promise)"; Transliteration: "Yakusoku – promessa -" (Japanese: 約束 – promessa -)	November 20, 2003	February 2, 2007
In a replaying of past events, Jean recruits Raballo, a retired member of the Carabinieri, to be Claes' handler. Initially, Claes finds it difficult to cope with Raballo's relentless training and strict businesslike relationship. However, after the two begin fishing together, they acquire a closer relationship. One day, Raballo quits the agency, and gives Claes her old glasses and a key to his room so she can read all the books she wants. He has her promise that she will always be gentle while wearing her glasses; Raballo then contacts a journalist for a meeting. Afterward, Jean informs Claes that Raballo was killed in a hit-and-run incident, causing her to break down mentally. Claes, unable to go on missions, is brainwashed again and used for scientific tests concerning her mechanical components. However, she enjoyed passing the time by reading, and other tasks, such as growing a vegetable patch.
6	"Gelato (Ice Cream)"; Transliteration: "Hōshū – gelato -" (Japanese: 報酬 – gelato -)	November 27, 2003	February 9, 2007
After barely defusing a bomb in a subway, the police begin to search for Enrico Beldini, a noted bomber. Henrietta and Jose overhear a conversation in which Beldini deals with the Padania Republic Faction for a bomb to use. The PRF, namely members Franca and Franco, agrees, but Enrico is tailed by Carabinieri agents throughout the city. Subsequently, Henrietta, Rico, and Triela raid Enrico's hideout, and they are able to dispatch his guards and capture him alive. Afterward, Jose gives Henrietta gelato from the Piazza di Spagna as her reward. Franca and Franco accidentally meet Henrietta, and remark after assuming that she is a daughter of wealth that she is one of the ones they are fighting for.
7	"Protezione (Protection)"; Transliteration: "Shugo – protezione -" (Japanese: 守護 – protezione -)	December 4, 2003	February 16, 2007
Rico and Jean encounter a man named Filippo Adani, and after conversing with him, tour the city of Florence, enjoying the artwork and architecture. In the museum, Filippo muses on how he threw away a possible career as an artist to become an accountant. Meanwhile, Jean apprehends an assassin from the PRF sent to kill Filippo, who is revealed to be an accountant for Pirazzi, a member of the PRF. Under the command of Cristiano, PRF members attempt to apprehend him, but he manages to escape with the aid of Rico and Henrietta. As he sits safely in the getaway car, he claims that he has nothing to live for, but Rico convinces him to go back to his artistic passions, which he accepts.
8	"Il Principe del regno della pasta (The Prince of the Pasta Kingdom)"; Transliteration: "Otogibanashi – Il Principe del regno della pasta -" (Japanese: 御伽噺 – Il Principe del Regno Della Pasta -)	December 18, 2003	February 23, 2007
Henrietta undergoes emotional testing with Dr. Bianchi, and afterward, Angelica also comes, who is revealed to have suffered memory loss. Marco, her handler, is confronted by Bianchi over his lack of care, and Marco reveals his frustration with teaching things to someone that merely forgets them. He recalls how, to soothe Angelica, he would read a story called "Il Principe del Regno Della Pasta." However, three months after their training started, she was unable to remember any part of the story, to his dissatisfaction. Combined with Marco's girlfriend deserting him due to his job, Marco treats Angelica coldly, regarding her solely as an assassin.
9	"Lycoris radiata Herb (Cluster Amaryllis)"; Transliteration: "Higanbana – Lycoris radiata Herb -" (Japanese: 彼岸花 – Lycoris radiata Herb -)	January 15, 2004	March 2, 2007
Elsa, another mechanized assassin girl, completes a mission to terminate a group of corrupt police officers on the orders of her handler, Lauro. Lauro recruits Jose for his next mission, and the two remark over their different views on treating the girls, Lauro's indifference contrasting against Jose's empathy. Henrietta attempts to converse with Elsa before the mission, but is rebuffed by the girl's single-minded devotion to Lauro. Meanwhile, Elsa grows increasingly envious over Jose and Henrietta's close relationship, and Lauro removes her from the mission, judging her unable to focus on it. After Jose and Henrietta succeed, Lauro comments on Elsa's uselessness, leaving her devastated.
10	"Amare (To Love)"; Transliteration: "Netsubyō – amare -" (Japanese: 熱病 – amare -)	January 29, 2004	March 9, 2007
Jose and Henrietta are on leave on a cruise to Sicily, and he comments that Elsa and Lauro were found dead in a park. Section One Chief Draghi decides to investigate, and sends Pietro Fermi and Elenora Gabrielli, with the motive being to undercut the credibility of using mechanized bodies. Pietro and Elenora tour the facility of Section Two and converse with Triela. Meanwhile, Jean discovers a serious fact concerning the case and lies to Section One, stating that Elsa died protecting Lauro, although Pietro is ultimately not satisfied with that answer and decides to further investigate.
11	"Febbre alta (High Fever)"; Transliteration: "Renbo – febbre alta-" (Japanese: 恋慕 – febbre alta-)	February 5, 2004	March 16, 2007
Pietro and Elenora leave for Sicily to meet with Jose and Henrietta, who are staying at one of Jose's family's summer homes. Pietro questions Jose on details about Elsa while Elenora helps Henrietta with the cooking. As they prepare to go shopping, a thief steals Henrietta's camera, and she retrieves it, with Elenora preventing her from seriously injuring the thief. With Elenora's aid, the dinner is a success, and Henrietta later confides in Elenora that she feels a compunction to be more than an ordinary girl for Jose's sake. She then determines that Elsa killed Lauro and committed suicide after realizing that her love for him was not reciprocated.
12	"Simbiosi (Symbiosis)"; Transliteration: "Kyōsei – simbiosi -" (Japanese: 共生 – simbiosi -)	February 12, 2004	March 23, 2007
Angelica is injured in a training session, leading the head of the Social Welfare Agency to question the value of Section Two. As a result, an elaborate scheme is hatched, with Claes posing as the daughter of a member of parliament in order to create a false hostage situation to eliminate Five Republics Faction terrorists. Despite her recent injury, Angelica asks to participate. The group manages to dispatch the terrorists, although Angelica is injured shortly before Claes knocks her attacker unconscious. Marco expresses his disapproval of Angelica afterward. In the hospital, Angelica exclaims that she would rather be dead than suffer Marco's anger and indifference. Claes angrily slaps her, claiming to have regretted saving her.
13	"Stella Cadente (Shooting Star)"; Transliteration: "Ryūsei – stella cadente -" (Japanese: 流星 – stella cadente -)	February 19, 2004	March 30, 2007
The girls plan to see a meteor shower, but Henrietta is distressed when Jose reveals that he is too busy and cannot attend. As a result, Triela tries to find a new chaperone, and Hilshire agrees after Triela helps him with his work. Meanwhile, Henrietta visits Angelica in the hospital, where Angelica hears a dog barking, causing her to remember her old dog. Henrietta relays this information to Marco, who is apathetic, but Henrietta implores him to visit his charge. He initially refuses and asks Henrietta whether she is dissatisfied with her mechanical condition, to which she responds that she has accepted who she is. Marco later goes to visit Angelica as the other girls go to see the meteor shower. The girls begin to sing Beethoven's Symphony No. 9 as Angelica listens to it in her hospital bedroom. She then asks Marco to read "Il Principe del Regno Della Pasta."

=== Gunslinger Girl -Il Teatrino- ===
No.	Title	Original release date
1	"Distance Between Two People: Brother and Sister"; Transliteration: "Futari no Kyori Kyōdai" (Japanese: 二人の距離 兄妹)	January 8, 2008
While preparing to return to Italy, Jose and Hilshire go to an antique store in France to pick gifts for their partners, Henrietta and Triela. On the train home, Jose has a flashback to when he was assigned to the Balkans and had to leave his younger sister, Enrica, with his older brother, Jean. Back in Italy, Jose and Henrietta join Jean and his partner Rico, as well as Hilshire and Triela, as they chase a group of bombers after they conduct an attack. With aid from all parties, the bombers are captured. Later at the headquarters, Henrietta goes to Jose's room, and finds inside a kaleidoscope addressed to a "Louise Antoinette Rolle", whom Henrietta suspects is Jose's lover. Heartbroken, Henrietta returns to her room, and voices this suspicion to her friends, Triela and Claes. Claes recalls that the woman in question is the mistress of a nineteenth century author who commonly used the character "Henrietta" in his novels. Pleased, Henrietta joins Jose stargazing, while Claes remarks that the kaleidoscope is likely fake.
2	"Pinocchio"; Transliteration: "Pinokkio" (Japanese: ピノッキオ)	January 15, 2008
In a flashback, Pinocchio, a young child, commits his first murder under the auspices of his foster father Cristiano. In the present, he finishes an assassination for the Padania Republic Faction (PRF). The leaders of the PRF, including Cristiano, meet to plan a bombing on the Strait of Messina Bridge, and they enlist the aid of Franca and Franco, a pair of terrorist bombers, to destroy the bridge, with Pinocchio assisting them. Franca is surprised at Pinocchio's social awkwardness, especially when he fails to identify that her car is an Alfa Romeo Giulietta. Afterward, Pinocchio tells Aurora, a girl living near him, to stay away from him. At the Section Two headquarters, Hilshire and Marco observe Angelica, Marco's partner, and Rico, as Hilshire prepares to leave on a mission with Triela in Montalcino.
3	"Simulacra"; Transliteration: "Shimyurakura" (Japanese: シミュラクラ)	January 22, 2008
Hilshire and Triela are ordered on a mission to relocate a member of the Public Safety Division who has gone missing in his search for a Padanian assassin named Pinocchio. While investigating at a hotel in Montalcino, Triela stumbles upon a book titled "Pinocchio" and begins reading it, later throwing it onto the ground for a lack of a better story. The next day, Triela ends up finding a girl named Aurora who happens to know Pinocchio. Unbeknown to Aurora, Triela slips a mic into her lunch basket. A moment later, Aurora sneaks into Pinocchio's house and is captured by him, Franca and Franco, who then hold her hostage. Triela and Hilshire break in and Triela fights Pinocchio but is outwitted and defeated by him. Although Aurora is saved thanks to Hilshire's effort to release her from Franca's grip, the terrorists are able to escape. Triela becomes humiliated after being beaten.
4	"Angelica's Return"; Transliteration: "Anjerika no Fukki" (Japanese: アンジェリカの復帰)	January 29, 2008
Angelica is allowed to go on her first field mission since her earlier hospitalization. Together with her handler, Marco, as well as Rico and Jean, they head for Milan to get more information on the activities of the PRF and Pinocchio in particular. Olga and Priscilla have also headed to Milan to check up on how Angelica is doing and Marco drafts them into helping with the mission at hand. Trouble arises, when it appears that Angelica is suffering from an addiction to her conditioning pills, as she breaks Priscilla's arm due to the withdrawal symptoms she is suffering from. Priscilla manages to convince Marco not to tell Jean about what has occurred, and to let Angelica continue with the mission. Marco relents, and the team ends up capturing Bruno and killing Vincenzo, who were the terrorists used by the PRF, after a successful ambush by Angelica and Rico. Angelica is initially disappointed in herself for failing to kill neither of the terrorists, due to their bulletproof car, but Marco praises her for carrying out the mission correctly, thus making her rather giddy with joy as she and Rico talk about what just occurred.
5	"Evanescence and Reminiscence"; Transliteration: "Utakata to Tsuioku" (Japanese: 泡沫と追憶)	February 5, 2008
A month after Angelica's successful return, she seems to be doing well. Marco, however, still has doubts, and is upset by the fact she is becoming more and more different from the old Angelica; Triela, on the other hand, remains deeply depressed after her failure in the fight against Pinocchio. Priscilla, feeling sorry for Angelica, offers her a ride back from the firing range on her Vespa, and the two become much closer, despite Angelica's continued memory loss. Meanwhile, Marco's ex-girlfriend, Patricia, is approached by a reporter named Leonardo Conti, who claims to know a shadowy truth about the Social Welfare Agency, and wants Patricia to help him investigate it. Driven by concern for Marco and a growing distrust for the Italian government, Patricia agrees, but Leonardo turns out to be a PRF undercover agent and takes Patricia hostage. After Angelica kills Leonardo, Patricia demands to know why he's aiding the government in its "crimes", to which Marco responds that he didn't end up that way because he wanted to, suggesting that he's still driven by his love for Angelica.
6	"Retirement of the Tibetan Terrier"; Transliteration: "Chibetan Teria no Intai" (Japanese: チベタンテリアの引退)	February 12, 2008
Section Two is asked to watch over an important politician, Chairwoman Isabella d'Angelo, whose agency is in charge of the Strait of Messina Bridge project. Meanwhile, the PRF agents send Nino, the "Tibetan Terrier", one of their best kidnappers, to seize her. Henrietta and Rico quarrel after the latter breaks the former's kaleidoscope, and Jose takes it to be repaired, at the very antiques shop in which Nino works as a cover. Jose and Henrietta are then assigned to guard Chairwoman d'Angelo, who debates the morality of using children as soldiers with Pieri Lorenzo. Jose discovers a PRF agent on the Chairwoman's staff and uses his information to set a trap for Nino's men. Meanwhile, the PRF agents themselves decide to charge in despite the advice of Nino, who has made up his mind to retire. Henrietta and Rico easily foil the PRF's kidnapping attempt, and the Chairwoman is saved. Nino leaves town, bidding a fond farewell to Franca.
7	"Caterina and the Circle of Revenge"; Transliteration: "Katerīna Fukushū no Enkan" (Japanese: カテリーナ 復讐の円環)	February 19, 2008
Flashbacks reveal that Franca, whose given name was Caterina, was the person who introduced Patricia to Marco when they were both going to the University of Rome. Franca, Franco, and Pinocchio are hiding out and recovering at her farm in Frascati after the escape from Section Two. Additional flashbacks reveal how, after her father dies in prison, Franca seeks out the bomber Franco to get revenge on the national government. Driving back from a meeting with her uncle, Franca stops to assist some stranded motorists, who instead turn out to be Section One agents. Franco and Pinocchio rescue her, killing all the agents in the process, and take her to a nearby hotel to recuperate. Section Two arrives and sets off an anti-personnel mine left under one of the agent's bodies, but Henrietta's quick actions save everyone from fatal injury.
8	"A Day in the Life of Claes"; Transliteration: "Kuraesu no Ichinichi" (Japanese: クラエスの一日)	February 26, 2008
Claes has dreams of her time with Raballo, but can't seem to remember who he is, which distresses her. However, she keeps her emotional distress to herself, and continues to follow her daily routine of reading, gardening, and piano-playing, as well as being examined by Section Two's science team. Jean, concerned about how much Claes recalls, has her watch a nature video that recalls the fishing trips she and her handler would take; this serves as something of a trigger for Claes, who goes wandering through the shooting range, and seems to remember Raballo's name. At the end of the episode, she and a new cyborg assassin, Beatrice, find a meteorite in Claes' herb garden, and the song Scarborough Fair is played as she reminisces over what she can remember of her handler.
9	"Clever Snake, Simple Pigeon"; Transliteration: "Kashikoi Hebi Junshin na Hato" (Japanese: 賢い蛇 純真な鳩)	March 4, 2008
Jose reunites with an old friend from the Italian military, with whom he reminisces on the past, and especially his sister, Enrica Croce, until a PRF terrorist detonates a bomb near their restaurant. After his capture by Bernardo and Beatrice and interrogation by Jean and Rico reveals a large supply of plastic explosive, supplied to the PRF through the military, Section Two is tasked with finding out the identity of the traitor. The trail eventually leads to Jose's old acquaintance, who is killed in a raid by the fratelli, badly upsetting Jose, and his superior, Lieutenant Colonel Garnier. Meanwhile, Henrietta is troubled both over feelings that she is being overly selfish with Jose and his general depression. She and Rico assassinate the Lieutenant Colonel and his second-in-command at a performance of Tosca, and Jose reaffirms his affection for Henrietta, gently pinching her on the cheek as he used to do with his sister.
10	"Flowers of Good Will"; Transliteration: "Zen'i no Hana" (Japanese: 善意の花)	March 11, 2008
Triela is still upset at her failure to defeat Pinocchio. Mario Bossi is testifying against the Mafia and Hilshire and Triela are sent to Naples to guard his teenage daughter, Maria "Mimi" Machiavelli. Triela undergoes close quarters combat training at a Carabineri base. And a series of flashbacks also tells the story of how Hilshire and Rachelle Belleut met at Europol and while investigating a snuff film, rescued Triela at the cost of Rachelle's life. It ends with Triela having one of her legs replaced and when she awakes, she notes that she dreamed of someone who was maybe her mother.
11	"Budding Feelings"; Transliteration: "Mebaeru Kanjō" (Japanese: 芽生える感情)	March 18, 2008
An assassin walks through a house, killing everyone he encounters. He calls Cristiano to report the successful completion of the job and he arrives to confirm it. As he leaves, Cristiano detects a false floor and in a room below they find a young boy, a boy who will become Pinocchio. Back in Frascati, Franca, Franco, and Pinocchio rest and recuperate. Franca's uncle calls, informing them that the police almost arrested him and will soon make a move to arrest Cristiano. They discuss plans to bomb the Strait of Messina Bridge. Section Two is expecting them, however, and multiple fratelli are in position to guard the structure along with the army and the navy.
12	"The Fighting Puppet"; Transliteration: "Tatakau Ningyō" (Japanese: 戦う人形)	March 25, 2008
Back at the bridge, the fratelli are searching for Franca, Franco, and Pinocchio. Henrietta discovers the three setting charges in the main support. She opens fire and a fire-fight ensues. They escape in a boat and Franco sets off the charges, though it is insufficient to drop the bridge. They return to the farm in Frascati and Triela returns to the house in Naples where she had her first fight with Pinocchio. Pinocchio goes to Cristiano's house in Milan just prior to Section Two launching their assault. They take out a gas station some of Cristiano's men are using as a guard house and then set up a road block to prevent anyone from escaping. In his house, Cristiano is planning his escape, but Section Two arrives and launches their assault. Triela and Pinocchio face each other for the second time.
13	"And So Pinocchio Becomes Human"; Transliteration: "Soshite Pinokkio wa Ningen ni" (Japanese: そしてピノッキオは人間に)	April 1, 2008
The story of Pinocchio comes to a conclusion. Franca and Franco decide to come to the aid of Cristiano and Pinocchio. Triela and Pinocchio battle it out with guns and knives while Hilshire looks for Cristiano. Pinocchio shoots Triela with her own pistol and Cristiano is shot and then captured by Jean and Rico. Franca and Franco arrive to rescue Cristiano and make their escape by car. They reach the roadblock and Angelica shoots Franca. They fail to negotiate a bend in the road and crash into a river. Triela finds Pinocchio and her training allows her to finally defeat him. In the aftermath of the battle, they dredge the car from the sea, but no bodies are found. All of the cyborgs are congratulated by their handlers for jobs well-done. Back at the compound, the girls settle back into their daily routine.
14	"The Light of Venice, The Darkness of the Heart"; Transliteration: "Venetsia no Hikari, Kokoro no Yami" (Japanese: ヴェネツィアの光、心の闇)	October 24, 2008 (OVA)
Jean goes to visit the grave of his fiance and encounters her brother, Fernando, and the two have a fight. Fernando decides to attack a PRF safe house, but is stopped by Jose and Jean. Marco and Angelica then proceed to wipe it out. Jean and Rico travel to Venice to eliminate a local mafia boss supporting the Rome terrorists, enlisting the help of Altmeyer, an agent with the Venice office. While shooting terrorists fleeing on a motor yacht, Rico is knocked off a perch and into the lagoon, where she starts to sink. Jean rescues her and as a reward, gives her the rest of the day off to go play on the beach.
15	"Fantasma"; Transliteration: "Fantazuma" (Japanese: ファンタズマ)	October 24, 2008 (OVA)
Henrietta and Rico, escorted by Hilshire, are traveling by ferry to Sicily to meet Jose and Jean, who are on vacation in the summer house Jose and Henrietta stayed in on their last visit to Sicily. Henrietta discovers the clothes of the Croce brothers' dead younger sister, Enrica, in the closet and Jose has her wear one of her summer dresses. Jean gets drunk and dreams of Enrica, who scolds Jean for letting Jose dress Henrietta in her clothes, saying it is not fair for Henrietta to replace Enrica in Jose's heart. But Jean blames himself for how Jose is and tells Enrica to be upset at him, instead. Down on the beach, Jose and Henrietta walk along the shore. The following day, the girls are playing in the water as the handlers discuss matters before walking out to be with them.

== See also ==
- List of Gunslinger Girl chapters
- List of Gunslinger Girl characters
