= Heckler & Koch UMP =

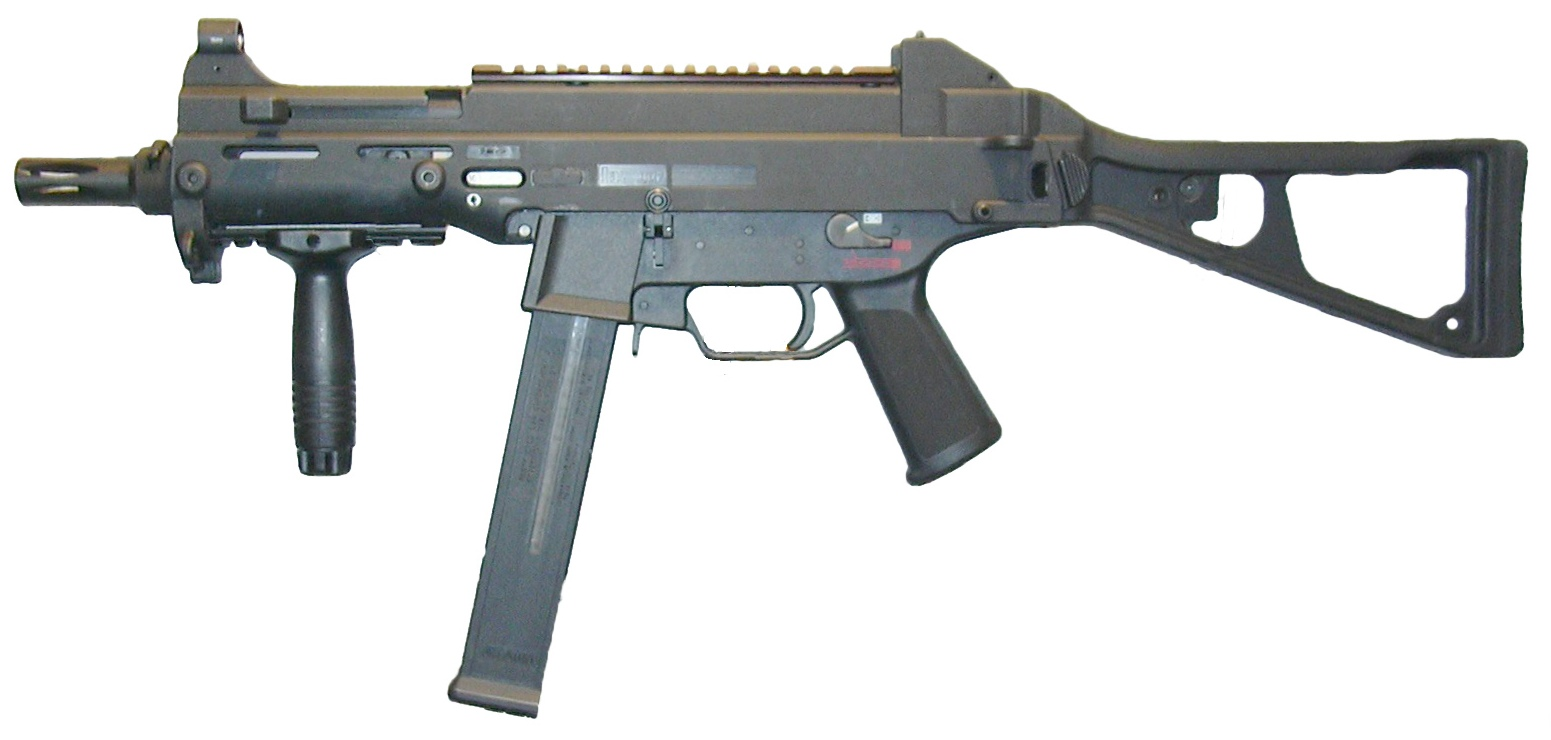
- HK UMP45 with a Knight's Armament Company vertical foregrip
- Type: Submachine gun
- Place of origin: Germany

Service history
- In service: 2000–present
- Used by: See Users
- Wars: Iraq War

Production history
- Designed: 1990s
- Manufacturer: Heckler & Koch
- Produced: 2000–present
- Variants: See Variants

Specifications
- Mass: Without magazine: 2.3 kg (5.1 lb) (UMP9/UMP40); 2.5 kg (5.5 lb) (UMP45); With unloaded magazine: 2.5 kg (5.5 lb) (UMP9); 2.55 kg (5.6 lb) (UMP40); 2.65 kg (5.8 lb) (UMP45)
- Length: 450 mm (17.7 in) (stock folded); 690 mm (27.2 in) (stock extended)
- Barrel length: 200 mm (7.9 in)
- Cartridge: 9×19mm Parabellum (UMP9).40 S&W (UMP40).45 ACP (UMP45/USC)
- Action: Blowback-operated, closed bolt
- Rate of fire: 600–750 rounds/min (UMP9, UMP40); 600–700 rounds/min (UMP45)
- Muzzle velocity: 380 m/s (1,250 ft/s) (9×19mm Parabellum); 358 m/s (1,170 ft/s) (.40 S&W); 260 m/s (870 ft/s) (.45 ACP)
- Effective firing range: 100 m (328 ft) (9×19mm Parabellum); 65 m (213 ft) (.45 ACP)
- Feed system: 30-round detachable curved box magazine (UMP9); 30-round detachable straight box magazine (UMP40); 25-round detachable straight box magazine (UMP45); 10-round detachable straight box magazine (USC)
- Sights: Iron sights and Picatinny rail for various optical sights

The Heckler & Koch UMP (Universale Maschinenpistole, German for "Universal Machine Pistol") is a submachine gun developed and manufactured by Heckler & Koch. It was designed as a lighter and cheaper successor to the HK MP5, though both remain in production.

The UMP can be converted between 9×19mm Parabellum, .40 S&W, and .45 ACP by changing the barrel, bolt, and magazine. Although it was previously available in all three calibres, a decline in global use of .40 S&W and .45 ACP has resulted in only the 9mm Parabellum variant remaining in production. However, parts are still available for the .40 S&W and .45 ACP variants.

The UMP has been adopted by various countries, including Brazil, Canada, and the United States. The UMP saw limited service in the early years of the Iraqi insurgency, making them one of the more popular submachine guns being deployed by the U.S. military personnel.

== History ==
The UMP was designed in the 1990s by Heckler & Koch (HK), as a cheaper, lighter alternative to the MP5, which made heavy use of polymers. The UMP first entered production in 2000. It was designed primarily for use by American military and law enforcement units, as the MP5 was not available in .45 ACP, a calibre which was popular in the United States, but not in Europe. Despite the UMP's improvements and reduced cost, it did not replace the MP5, which ended up outselling the UMP.

=== Recall ===
In 2000, Heckler & Koch recalled certain UMP and USC serial numbers due to faulty operating handles. The faulty polymer handles could break off, rendering the UMP and USC inoperable.

== Design details ==
The UMP is a blowback-operated, magazine-fed submachine gun that fires from a closed bolt. The closed bolt design increases the accuracy, which is particularly desirable in a law enforcement context. However, the simple blowback design of the UMP makes it less controllable than the MP5.

The UMP was originally designed for larger cartridges such as the .40 S&W and .45 ACP, to provide more stopping power against unarmoured targets, with slightly lower effectiveness at longer ranges. A larger cartridge produces more recoil and makes it harder to control in fully automatic fire. To mitigate the excessive recoil, Heckler & Koch designed the UMP to have a cyclic rate of around 600 rounds per minute, though the rate of fire increases up to 700 rounds per minute if (+ P) ammunition is used for the UMP45 and 745 rounds per minute for the UMP40.

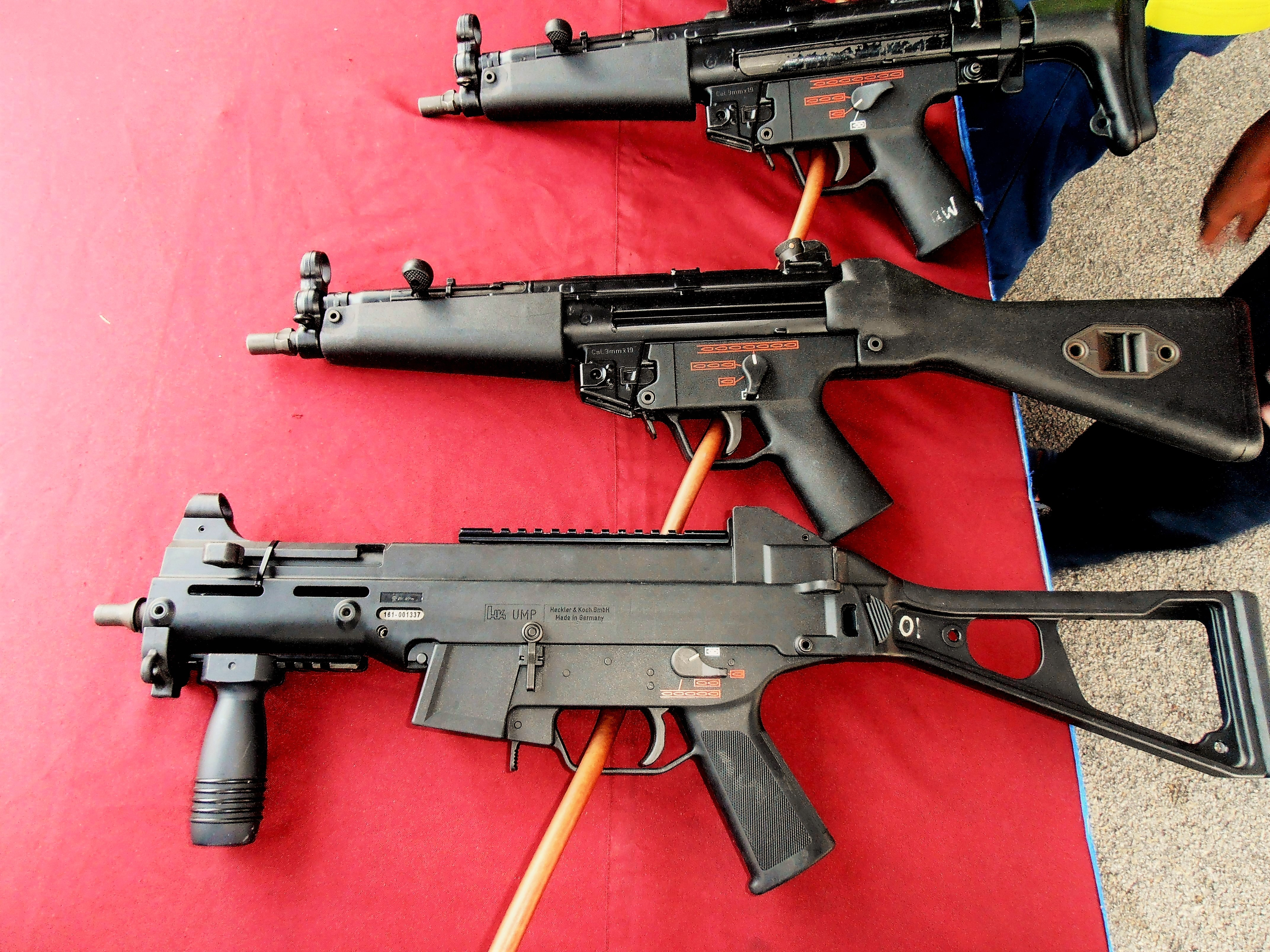
MP5A5 (top), MP5A4 (middle) and UMP9 (bottom) on display at a Malaysian Navy armoury exhibition

The UMP9 (the 9×19mm variant of the UMP) is almost 0.2 kg (0.44 lb) lighter than the MP5. It has a cyclic rate of around 600–750 rounds per minute. Its predominantly polymer construction reduces both its weight and the number of parts susceptible to corrosion.

The UMP is available in four trigger group configurations, featuring different combinations of semi-automatic, 2-round burst, fully automatic, and safe settings. It features a side-folding buttstock to reduce its length during transport. When the last round of the UMP is fired, the bolt locks open, and can be released via a catch on the left side. The iron sights consist of an aperture rear sight and a front ring with a vertical post. It can mount four Picatinny rails (one on top of the receiver, and one on the right, left, and bottom of the handguard) for mounting accessories such as optical sights, tactical lights, or laser sights. Vertical foregrips can be attached to the bottom rail for better control during burst and automatic fire.

== Variants ==
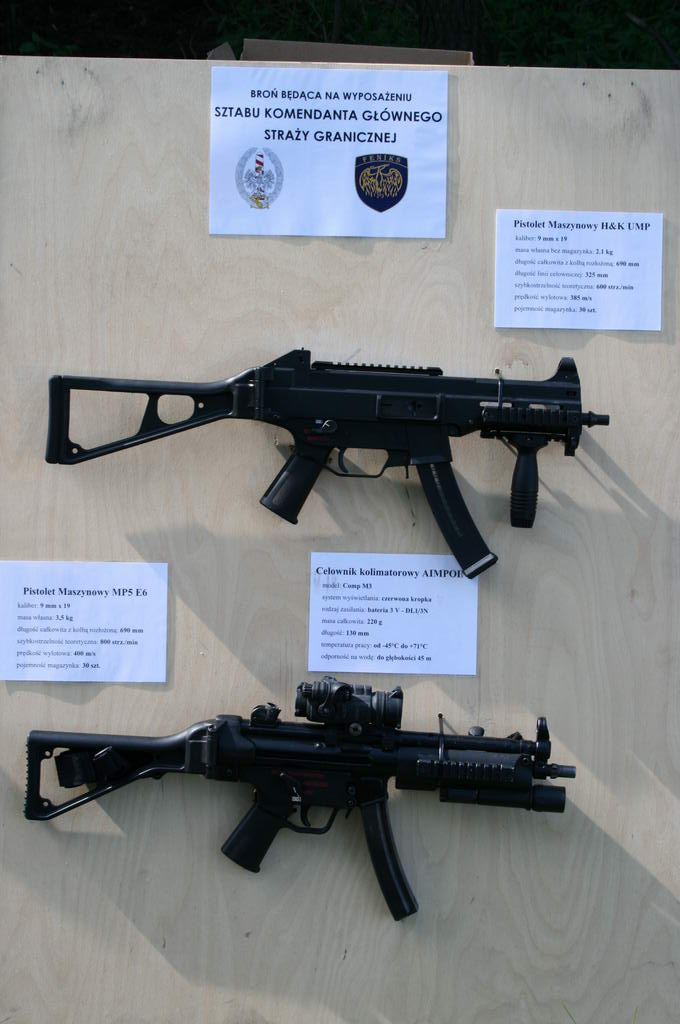
UMP9 (top) and MP5 E6 (bottom) on display at Military University of Technology

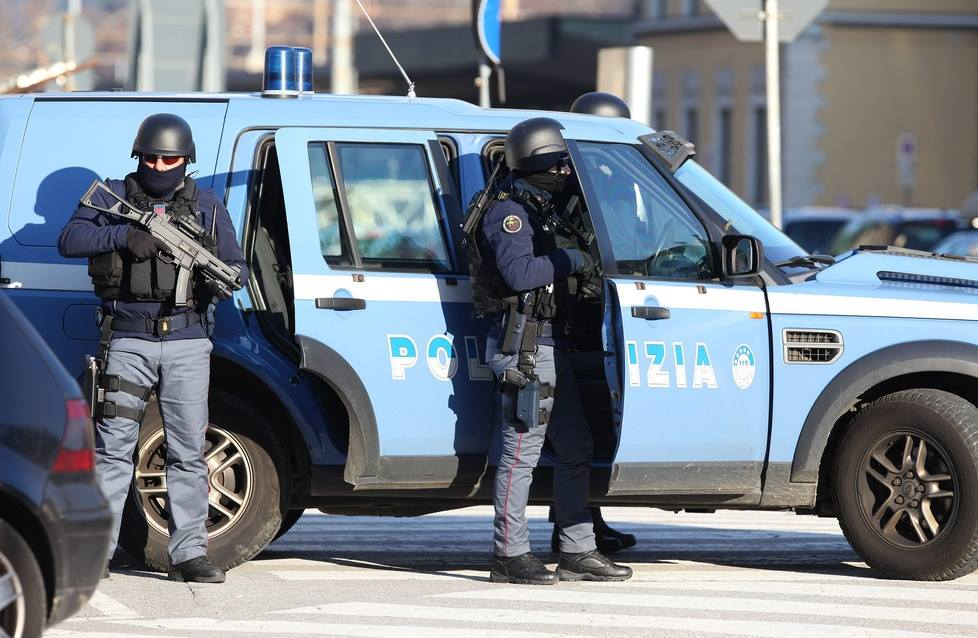
UOPI operator with a UMP9

The UMP can be converted between three different calibres:

- The UMP9, chambered in 9×19mm Parabellum
- The UMP40, chambered in .40 S&W
- The UMP45, chambered in .45 ACP

Apart from their different chamberings, all variants feature the same basic design. The notable exterior difference is that the UMP9 uses a curved magazine, while both the UMP40 and UMP45 use a straight magazine. All three variants of the UMP can be cross-converted to any of the three calibres by replacing the bolt, barrel, and magazine.

=== USC ===
The Heckler & Koch USC or Universal Self-loading Carbine is a semi-automatic-only variant of the UMP designed for civilian use. It was created following the Assault Weapons Ban of 1994 in the United States and was introduced in 2000. Changes from the original UMP include a "thumbhole" type stock/grip instead of the pistol grip of the UMP, a longer barrel without the flash suppressor, a magazine limited to 10 rounds, and a semi-automatic-only trigger group and action. Originally available in grey, as of 2008 the USC came only in an all-black finish.

Production of the USC was halted in 2013. In 2018, Heckler & Koch announced a limited production run of the USC.

=== Clones ===
- Omega Gideon Shadow – American clone of the UMP released in 2017.
- Tommy Built Tactical TMP/KSM – American clone of the UMP.
- DefGunz DEF9 – American clone of the UMP receiver released in 2024.
- S5 Tactical SMP – American clone of the UMP receiver released in 2025.

== Users ==
Country	Organisation name	Model	Date	References
Australia	Victoria Police Critical Incident Response Team	UMP40	_
Australia	New South Wales Police Force State Protection Group	UMP40	_
Brazil	Special Operations Command of the Brazilian Army	UMP9	_
Brazil	Amphibious Commandos of the Brazilian Marine Corps	UMP9	_
Canada	Brantford Police Service Emergency Response Team	UMP40	_
France	National Gendarmerie	UMP9	2008
France	Directorate-General of Customs and Indirect Taxes	UMP9	2016
France	National Police (France)	UMP9	2016
Georgia	Special Operations Forces	UMP45	_
Jordan	Jordanian Special Operations Forces	_	_
Latvia	Latvian Army	UMP9	_
Liechtenstein	Special Police Unit	_	_
Liechtenstein	Security Corps	_	_
Malaysia	Pasukan Khas Laut (PASKAL) counter-terrorism team of the Royal Malaysian Navy	UMP45	2006
Malaysia	Malaysian Maritime Enforcement Agency	UMP9	_
Mexico	Mexican Marines	_	_
Paraguay	Regimiento Escolta Presidencial.	UMP9	_
Poland	Policja	UMP9	_
Portugal	Portuguese Armed Forces	_	_
Romania	Romanian Special Operations Forces	UMP9	_
Romania	Romanian Naval Forces special operations group (GNFOS)	UMP9	_
Serbia	72nd Brigade for Special Operations and 63rd Parachute Brigade of the Serbian Armed Forces	UMP9	_
Slovakia	5th Special Forces Regiment of the Armed Forces of Slovak Republic	UMP9	_
South Africa	National Intervention Unit - A special operations element of the South African Police Service (SAPS)	UMP9	_
Spain	Spanish Army	_	_
United States	U.S. Border Patrol	UMP40	_
United States	Pentagon Force Protection Agency	UMP40	_
United States	Henry County Police Department, Georgia	UMP40	_
United States	Charlotte-Mecklenburg Police Department	UMP40	_
United States	Baltimore City Police Department	UMP40	_

== See also ==
- Beretta Mx4 Storm
- Brügger & Thomet APC
- CS/LS5
- CS/LS7
- CZ Scorpion Evo 3
- FAMAE SAF-200
- Floro MK-9
- PP-19-01 Vityaz
- Taurus SMT
