= National Police (Liechtenstein) =

Law enforcement agency

National Police Landespolizei des Fürstentums Liechtenstein
- Common name: Landespolizei
- Abbreviation: LNPS
- Motto: Für Gott, Fürst, und Vaterland; For God, Prince, and Fatherland

Agency overview
- Formed: 1933
- Employees: 125 (2011)

Jurisdictional structure
- National agency: Liechtenstein
- Operations jurisdiction: Liechtenstein
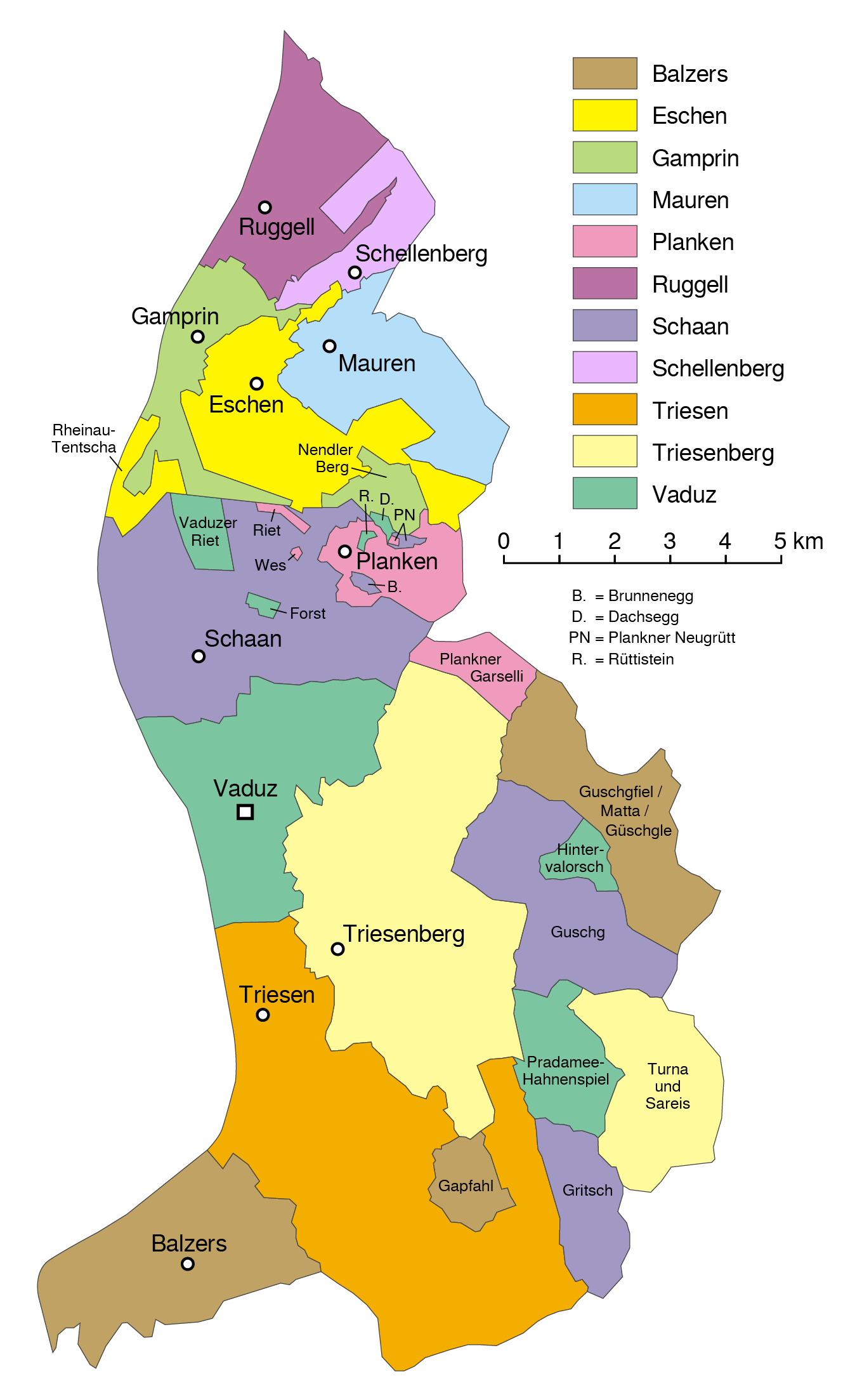
- Administrative divisions of Liechtenstein
- Area: 160 km^{2}
- Population: 36,000
- Governing body: Office of Civil Protection
- Constituting instrument: Constitution of Liechtenstein
- General nature: Local civilian police

Operational structure
- Headquarters: Vaduz
- Sworn members: 125
- Unsworn members: 38 (Security Corps)
- Elected officer responsible: Dominique Hasler, Minister
- Agency executive: Jules Hoch, Chief of Police
- Divisions: Security and Traffic Control, Criminal Investigation, Executive Support, Commissioner's Office, Security Corps

Facilities
- Headquarters: Vaduz
- Vehicles: 45
- Speedboats: 2
- Helicopters: 1

Website
- www.landespolizei.li

The National Police of the Principality of Liechtenstein (German: Landespolizei des Fürstentums Liechtenstein), (Note: However, there are ten Interpol and two Europol agents stationed in Vaduz.) is the national police force of Liechtenstein. It is composed of 125 employees, with 91 officers and 34 staff (excluding the Security Corps), who police the 160 km^{2} (62 sq mi) doubly landlocked alpine state in Western-Central Europe. The current chief of police is Jules Hoch, since 2013.

Bordered by Switzerland to its west, and Austria to its east, Liechtenstein maintains a trilateral treaty which enables close cross-border co-operation between the police services of the three states. Liechtenstein is also a member of Interpol, and a signatory to a variety of other treaties.

== Crime ==
Liechtenstein has a significantly low crime rate. Crime has always been low since the mid-1970s when Liechtenstein started to prosper as a nation. According to an International Special Reports study, the average Liechtenstein resident does not even lock their door. Liechtenstein jails hold very few, if any, inmates, with sentences over two years being transferred to Austria. However, officers in the National Police have been armed since a shooting took place. In 2003, Liechtenstein drafted 300 Swiss and Austrian police to assist security forces in the potential aftermath of a Liechtenstein victory over England, in a Euro Cup qualifying match, at Rheinpark Stadion.

== Structure ==
The National Police are divided into three divisions, and two independently operated subdivisions:

- Security and Traffic Control (64 officers; 5 civilian men and women); Administration Security and Traffic Unit, Security Unit, Traffic Unit, Traffic Engineering and Prevention Unit, Intervention Unit (police tactical unit), (Note: The Intervention Unit, along with the Security Corps is considered by some Liechtensteiners to be a military unit, due in part to its deployment of body armour, a Bell UH-1 helicopter, and automatic weapons which include Heckler & Koch UMPs, Heckler and Koch MP5s, and SIG machine guns. The unit also has semi-military roles such as counterterrorism, maritime security, air defense, prisoner transport, and assists the Protection Unit in escorting VIPs.) Border Unit, Riot Police, (Note: Also called the Security Corps is one of two independently operated subdivisions.) and Protection Unit. (Note: The Protection Unit is mainly used by the royal family, however, elected officials, diplomats, or ordinary citizens may request protection from the unit. Since 1989 the Special Police Unit was assigned to assist in case of need.)
- Criminal Investigation (16 officers; 10 civilian men and women); Administration Crime Investigation Division, Serious Crime Unit, Trace Unit, Financial Crime Unit, Forensic Unit, Crime Intelligence Unit. Officers are generally issued a SIG Sauer pistol, the standard issue being the SIG Sauer P226.
- Executive Support (7 officers; 15 civilian men and women); Chief of Staff, (Note: Also called the Chief of Staff and Commissioner's Office is one of two independently operated subdivisions.) Systems Organization and Quality Department, Logistics, Emergence Command and Dispatch, Information Technology, State Penitentiary, and Relations Unit.
- Chief of Staff and Commissioner's Office (3 officers; 7 civilian men and women); Traffic and Administration Law Department, Legal Assistant, Commissioner's Office; Public Information Center, and Finance and Controlling.
- Security Corps (38 militiamen); The Security Corps are a paramilitary force, composed entirely of Liechtensteiners, who can be called upon in case of a natural disaster, or riot situation. The Corps also performs honorary roles such as changing the guard, and presenting the Coat of Arms at official occasions. Differing from all other units (except for the Special Police Unit), the Corps are trained and equipped with weapons such as Heckler & Koch UMPs and Heckler & Koch MP5s.

== Security ==
Law enforcement in Liechtenstein is handled solely by the National Police, although a paramilitary force is maintained inside the police body. Liechtenstein follows a policy of neutrality, and is one of few countries in the world that maintains no active military. Liechtenstein's army was abolished in 1868, soon after the Austro-Prussian War in which Liechtenstein fielded an army of 80 men, although they were not involved in any fighting. However, Liechtenstein can reinstate its military if deemed necessary, although this is very unlikely.

=== Swiss military ===
Switzerland has a relatively active military due to conscription. Some incursions into Liechtenstein's sovereign territory have occurred during routine training:

- On 5 December 1985, an RL-83 Blindicide antitank rocket fired by the Swiss Armed Forces landed in territory in Balzers in Liechtenstein, causing a forest fire. Compensation was paid to the private owner.
- On 13 October 1992, following written orders, Swiss Army cadets unknowingly crossed the border and went to Triesenberg to set up an observation post. Swiss commanders had overlooked the fact that Triesenberg was not in Swiss territory. Switzerland apologized to Liechtenstein for the incident.
- On 3 March 2007, a company of 171 Swiss soldiers mistakenly entered Liechtenstein in bad weather at night, after taking a wrong turn in the darkness. The troops returned to Swiss territory after they travelled more than 2 km into the country. The Liechtenstein authorities did not discover the "invaders", and were informed by the Swiss after the incident. The incident was disregarded by both sides. A Liechtenstein spokesman said "It's not like they invaded with attack helicopters".

== Policing treaties ==
Since 1933, the National Police have signed seven strategic treaties.

- Working Group Southwest
- Europol
- International Police Association (IPA)
- Interpol
- Eastern Swiss police Concordat
- Police union boss Constance
- Organization for Security and Cooperation in Europe (OSCE)

== Emergencies ==
The national emergency telephone number is 112, for police it is 117, for the fire brigade it is 118, for the ambulance service it is 144, and for the Rega it is 1414. The fire brigade also operates a 30-person volunteer mountain rescue service. Officer uniforms are similar to that of the Swiss cantonal police, both in color, and design.

== Customs control ==
The border between Switzerland and Liechtenstein is open, but Swiss customs officers used to secure Liechtenstein's border with Austria. Before December 2011, there were 21 Swiss, four Liechtenstein National Police and 28 Austria border guards, who secured the 11.6 km long Liechtenstein-Austria border, however, only 20 percent is passable. Even though the National Police maintains a border unit, the Swiss border police are responsible for border protection of both countries according to a customs union adopted in 1924.

In February 2007, there were hundreds of people trying to seek asylum in Liechtenstein, mainly from countries such as Somalia and Eritrea. Due to the number of people attempting to cross the border, border guards were stationed on both the Liechtenstein-Swiss border and the Liechtenstein-Austria border, with the main objective of maintaining law and order for all Liechtensteiners. This security measure lasted for about 90 days, with well over 800 people seeking asylum in Liechtenstein.

In December 2011, Liechtenstein became the fourth non-European Union country to join the Schengen Area after Switzerland, Norway and Iceland. Under the agreement, Liechtenstein maintains an open border with both Switzerland and Austria, and resulted in the closure of several Liechtenstein-Austria border stations. In addition, Balzers Heliport restricts all helicopters coming from non-Schengen countries, which in theory, limits security concerns. However, Liechtenstein has strengthened its customs control by way of a high-tech video surveillance system (over 60 cameras costing $2.3 million) as well as regular mobile border patrol units.

== Border gallery ==
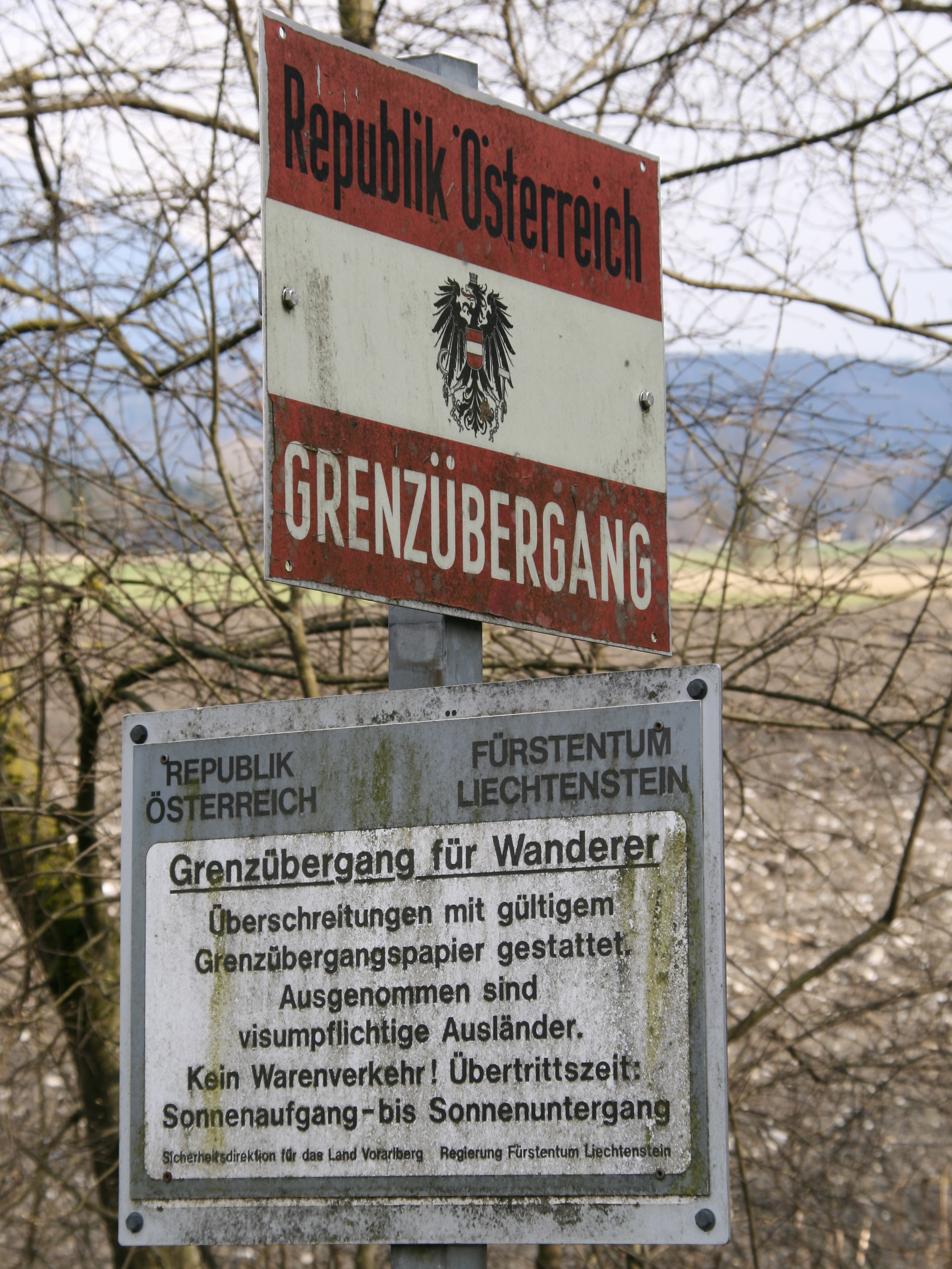
Looking at an Austria border sign

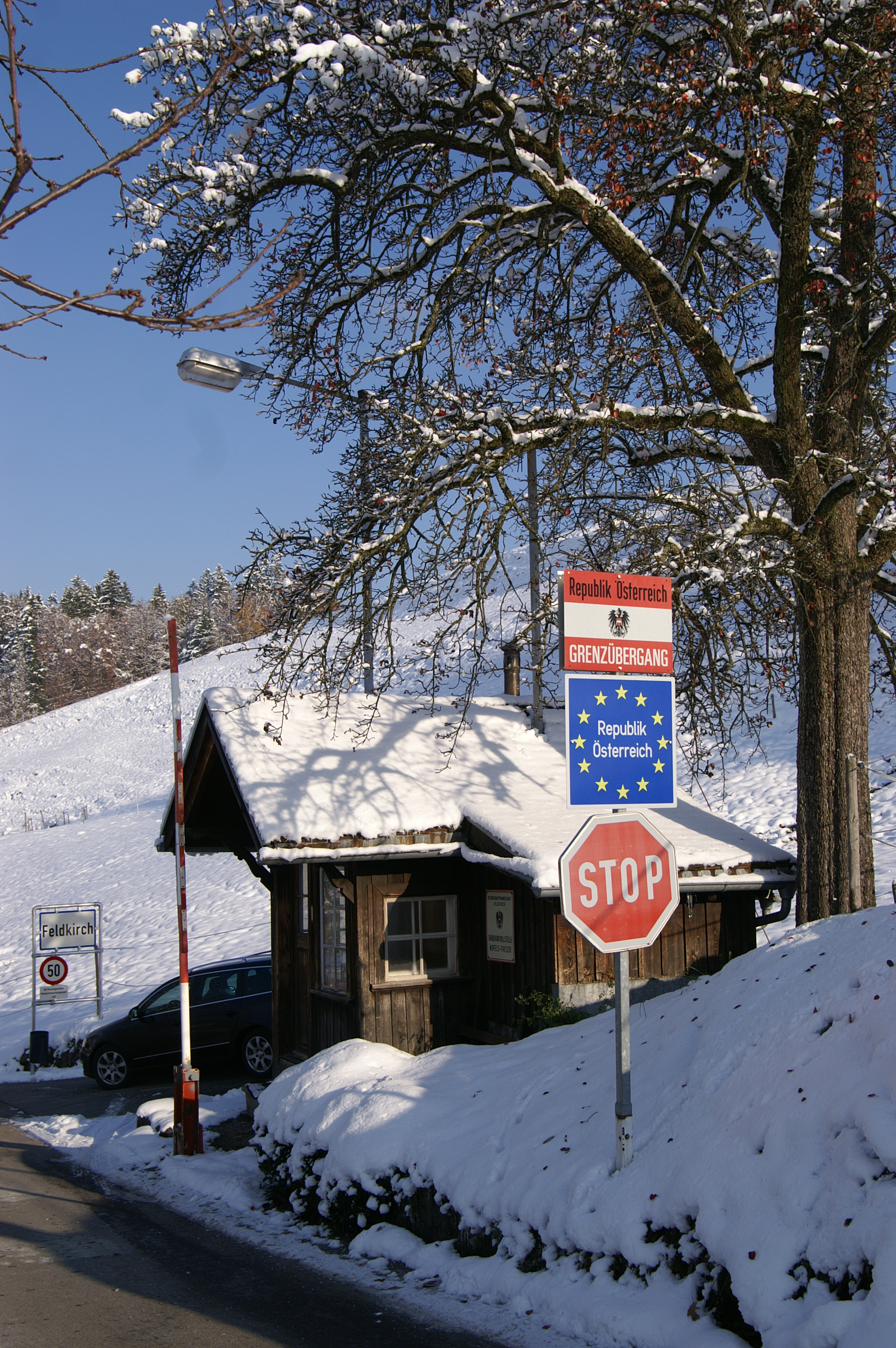
Looking into Austria from Liechtenstein, with a joint border station

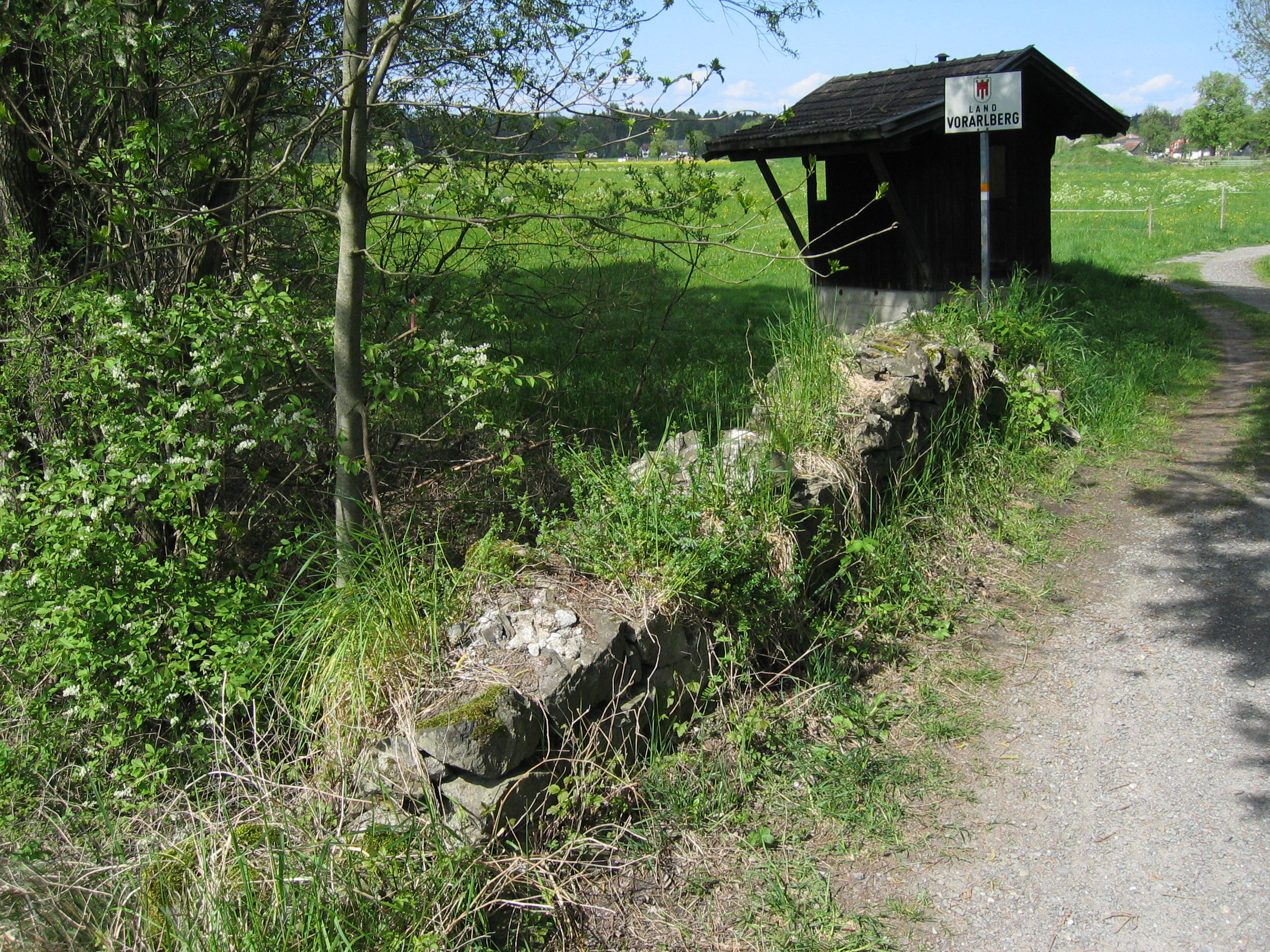
Looking into Austria from Liechtenstein, with a joint border station

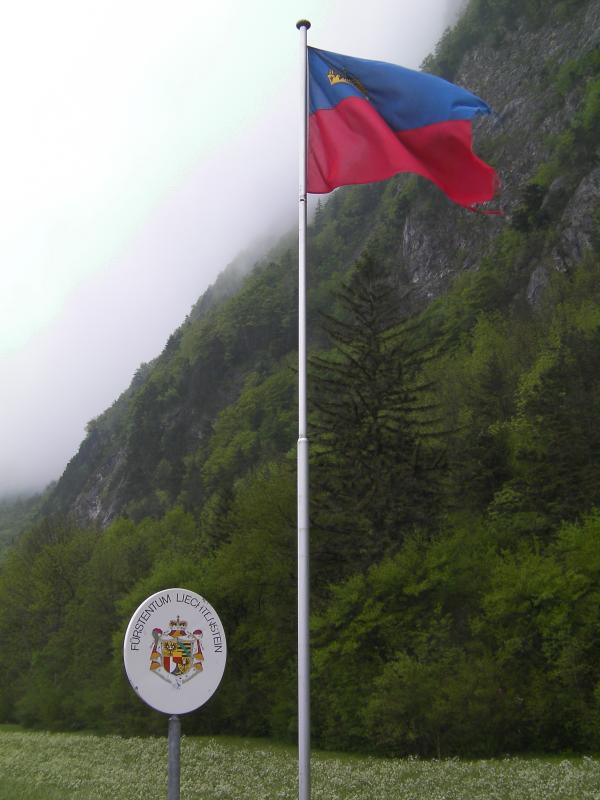
Looking from Switzerland to Liechtenstein, with no border controls

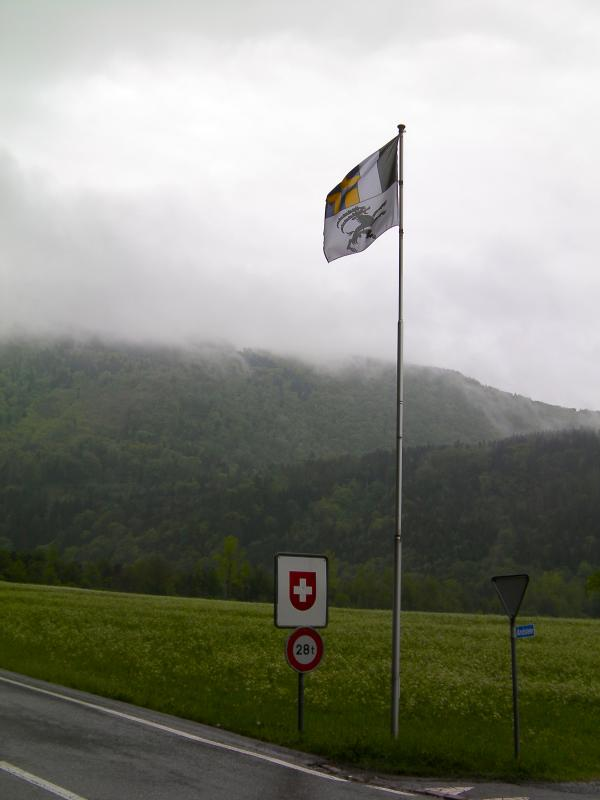
Looking from Liechtenstein to Switzerland, with no border controls

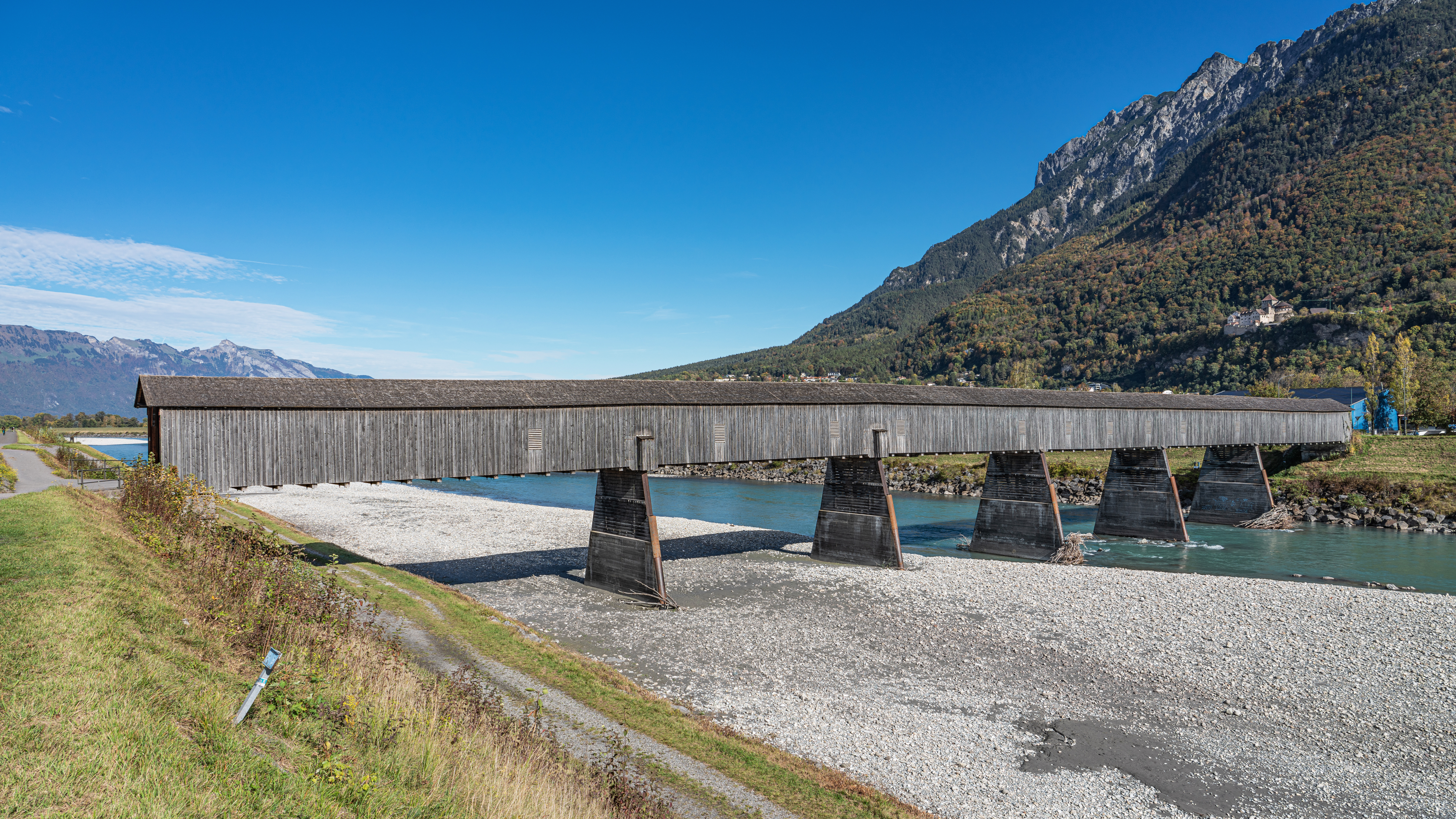
Looking at a pedestrian bridge crossing the Liechtensteiner-Swiss border
