= List of Gunslinger Girl characters =

The following is a list of characters from the Japanese manga series Gunslinger Girl.

Set in modern-day Italy, the series revolves around the Social Welfare Agency, a government-funded organisation which is supposed to provide advanced medical care to those in need. This, however, is a cover for a far different agenda: the patients, adolescent girls who have survived traumatic events, are brainwashed into forgetting their past, turned into cyborgs, trained in the use of weapons and used as assassins to battle enemies of the State. Each girl is assigned to an adult whose job is to provide the girl with training and act as a mentor and authority figure. The relationship between the cyborg-girls and their "handlers" forms the basis of much of the plot and varies from the affectionate to the indifferent with varying degrees of results.

== Child cyborg assassins ==
=== First Generation ===
Henrietta (ヘンリエッタ)
Voiced by: Yuka Nanri (Gunslinger Girl), Kana Akutsu (Gunslinger Girl: Il Teatrino) (Japanese); Laura Bailey (English)
Left for dead after the brutal murder of her family, during which she herself was assaulted, Henrietta suffered severe psychological trauma, making her suicidal. Like the other cyborg-girls, she was brainwashed into forgetting these events by a technique known as conditioning. Henrietta has short brown hair and brown eyes. Henrietta is devoted to her handler, Jose Croce, towards whom she has strong feelings. She even shows signs of jealousy when she feels Jose is paying attention to other women. He encourages her to share his interest in astronomy which she passes on to the other girls. Jose even gives her a diary, but this causes her distress when, as a result of the long-term effects of the conditioning, she begins to forget the events she noted in the book. Henrietta's preferred weapons are the SIG Sauer P239 Two-Tone, the Fabrique Nationale P90 PDW, and the FN FAL. She and her handler have also used the Walther WA 2000 sniper rifle and Ingram MAC-10.
Rico (リコ, Riko)
Voiced by: Kanako Mitsuhashi (Gunslinger Girl), Anri Shiono (Gunslinger Girl: Il Teatrino) (Japanese); Luci Christian (English)
Confined to a hospital by severe birth defects, Rico was signed over by her parents to the SWA on her eleventh birthday. Rico loves her new body and life at the SWA, viewing each day as a blessing and maintaining a happy disposition. Rico appears to be the only cyborg with a clear memory of her life before coming to the SWA. Rico's interrelationship with Jean is often marked by his seeming apathy towards her, and his harsh treatment of her when she makes mistakes, while Rico accepts his treatment of her as without question, only occasionally showing subtle signs of discontent. At his own request she shoots through and very nearly kills Jean, who was being used as a shield by Dante, in order to kill Dante (although he also survives). In the epilogue of the penultimate chapter, it is revealed through Claes's narration that Rico passed away one year after the end of the main story. In the final chapter, after an undetermined amount of time has passed, Jean still keeps a picture of Rico on his desk.
Rico's preferred weapons are the CZ-75 pistol and the Dragunov SVD. In chapter 79 she wields a FN SCAR with a CQC barrel and chambered in 7.62 NATO. She has also been shown wielding a Beretta SCP-70/90 and is additionally shown training with a Galil MAR carbine and a Benelli M4 Super 90 shotgun. Her preferred support weapon is the MG 3 general purpose machine gun.
Triela (トリエラ, Toriera)
Voiced by: Eri Sendai (Gunslinger Girl), Atsuko Enomoto (Gunslinger Girl: Il Teatrino) (Japanese); Caitlin Glass (English)
Originally from Tunisia, Triela was kidnapped and smuggled to Amsterdam by the Mafia, where she was assaulted during a taping of a snuff film. She was rescued by Victor Hilshire and Rachelle Belleut, after he took her to the SWA for treatment to her injuries. But she was also converted to a cyborg without his knowledge. Extremely pragmatic with just a hint of rebellion, Triela has a sarcastic wit and prefers to wear masculine clothing, though she does wear more feminine clothing in later chapters. She serves as a sort of mentor to the other girls of the SWA and retains a realistic outlook on her situation within the Agency. As the second oldest cyborg, Triela is beginning to experience the memory loss and medicinal withdrawals that plagued Angelica's final months, and has stated that she will probably die soon. She and Victor were killed during the New Turin Nuclear Plant incident and their bodies were later found together by the agency's cleanup crew. It is revealed in Victor's will that he had secretly had some of Triela's eggs preserved in a hospital. One of these is implanted to Roberta Guellfi, who bears and raises Triela's child, a girl she names "Speranza" (hope).
Triela's preferred weapons are the SIG-Sauer P230 SL pistol (after losing her P230 to Pinocchio, she is given a P232 as a replacement) and the M1897 Trench Shotgun with bayonet attachment. She has also been shown using a selection of Heckler & Koch weaponry, including the H&K G3A3 battle rifle, the H&K P7M8 pistol, H&K UMP submachine gun and H&K MP7 PDW.
Claes (クラエス, Kuraesu)
Voiced by: Ami Koshimizu (Gunslinger Girl), Risa Mizuno (Gunslinger Girl: Il Teatrino) (Japanese); Alese Johnson (English)
Born Fleda Claes Johansson and the daughter of a professor who instilled in her a love for books at an early age, it is unknown how she arrived at the Social Welfare Agency. Claes is usually confined to the Agency, unable to participate in missions with the other girls since the death of her handler Raballo. She is used as a test subject by the cyborg engineers, who utilize controlled situations and equipment to monitor the usefulness of her implants. Since she and Raballo had bonded closely before his death it was decided that she could not be assigned to another handler, so she was re-conditioned to remove all memory of him. However, her life since then subconsciously reflects his influence through things like her painting of fishing, accessing the books in Raballo's former dorm room and her enjoyment of gardening. Claes wears glasses from her life before her cybernetic operation as a visual reminder of a promise she once made to Raballo to "be good", but over time she's come to believe that she should not engage in violence at all — which causes complications when she and Petra are sent to capture some suspected weapons smugglers. After the New Turin incident, when the government sends soldiers to terminate the Social Welfare Agency (who have served their purpose and are now just 'dirty laundry'), Claes confronts them, but breaks down when she hears mention of Raballo – although it is left uncertain whether she is finally able to remember him, or not. Her final fate is unknown, but it can be presumed that she continues to live with the Social Welfare Agency or its successor until her death.
While part of a fratello with Raballo, Claes employed the H&K VP70M and the MP5K PDW.
Angelica (アンジェリカ, Anjerika)
Voiced by: Hitomi Terakado (Gunslinger Girl), Kana Hanazawa (Gunslinger Girl: Il Teatrino) (Japanese); Monica Rial (English)
Angelica was almost killed in a hit-and-run accident staged by her father to collect the life insurance he had on her. She thus became the first girl converted to a cyborg. Originally she remembered her family, but later she was conditioned to forget them. This conditioning significantly dampened her gregarious and outgoing nature, which alienated her from her handler, Marco. As the first cyborg to undergo the conditioning process, she became the first cyborg to suffer the deleterious effects. She suffered serious injuries while protecting on a mission at the end of season 1, but manages to slowly recover and eventually rejoin the other girls, despite the doubts of some Section 2 members. In the manga, Angelica's memory and function continue to deteriorate in a manner similar to those suffering Alzheimer's Disease. She passes away after reconciling with Marco and trying to comfort him with the Prince of Pasta story, despite no longer being able to recognize him. The Angelica/Marco fratello exclusively used Steyr-Mannlicher weapons including the AUG A2, TMP compact submachine gun, M-A1 pistol and the AUG H-BAR LMG.
Elsa de Sica (エルザ・デ・シーカ, Eruza de Shīka)
Voiced by: Mamiko Noto (Japanese); Brina Palencia (English)
Elsa de Sica's world revolved around her handler, Lauro, even though he showed general disinterest towards her. Triela claimed that Elsa was in love with Lauro and generally ignored the other cyborgs. In both the manga and the anime, Henrietta believes that Elsa, knowing Lauro would never return her feelings of love and affection, took him to the park where Lauro named her and murdered him, taking her own life thereafter. Elsa's preferred weapons were the SIG 550, SIG 551, and SIG P229, and is also shown to use as a secondary sniping weapon a PGM Hecate II.
In the manga, Elsa never appeared alive (exceptions being a very brief flashback), and was only introduced after her death. The anime, however, devoted an entire episode to her relationship with her handler as a prelude to her killing him and then herself.
In the anime, Elsa is said to be the newest addition to the Agency.
Beatrice (ベアトリーチェ, Beatorīche)
Voiced by: Mariya Ise (Japanese); Cherami Leigh (English)
Beatrice is able to smell explosives either on a person or structure, an ability used by her handler to help identify potential suspects. In both the anime and manga she is portrayed as both apathetic and unemotional. She forms a friendship with Claes, who teaches her botany and gardening. Beatrice's preferred weapon is the IMI Micro Uzi machine pistol. She is killed during the Venice Operation against Giacomo Dante in Volume 11 by a shot to the chest from a Denel NTW-20 anti-materiel rifle, while throwing a 500kg missile warhead out of the Belltower of St. Marks. Her last thoughts were about her unique duty to do what normal people cannot do because she does not fear death, and the many people who wish for Triela to live.
Silvia (シルヴィア, Shiruvia)
Introduced in Chapter 60, Silvia has long wavy hair and carries a Benelli M4 Super 90 shotgun. She and her handler have been with the SWA for just under three years and they spent time together in Bologna. She is killed during the Venice Operation against Giacomo Dante in Volume 11.
Chiara (キアーラ, Kiaara)
Introduced in Chapter 60, Chiara has short dark hair and appears to carry an FR Ordnance MC51. Chiara became a cyborg shortly before Silvia did. She is wounded during the Venice Operation against Giacomo Dante in Volume 11. She does not appear again in the manga, so her fate is unknown.
Pia (ピア, Pia)
Seen only in the PS2 video game, her handler was a sleeper Padania agent who escaped with her. Dialogue in the game states she was created at the same time as Henrietta and Rico.
Unidentified Cyborgs
In Chapter 18, two unidentified girls are shown in the dining room. The one entering is likely Beatrice based on her hair style and clothing. It is possible the girl at the table with dark hair is Chiara.
In Chapter 33, also in the dining room, an unidentified girl with long dark hair is seen with a tray of food.

=== Second Generation ===
Petrushka (ペトルーシュカ, Petorūshuka)
Elizaveta Baranovskaya (エリザヴェート･バラノフスカヤ, Erizaveto Baranofusukaya) (Russian: Елизавета Барановская) was a Russian ballerina (the manga states her parents were from Southern Belarus, but later moved to Russia student at the Bolshoi Ballet Academy).Irradiated as a result of the Chernobyl disaster, she developed a tumor in her leg at sixteen. Sent to Italy for treatment, her leg could not be saved and was amputated. Distraught at her dreams of becoming a ballerina ending, she attempted suicide by jumping off the roof. She was transferred to the SWA and made into a cyborg. Renamed Petrushka (after the Russian puppet of the same name) by her handler Alessandro Ricci, she underwent plastic surgery as part of her new life. Thus she is not naturally redheaded or green-eyed. As Angelica was the prototype for the first-generation cyborgs (Henrietta, Rico, Triela etc.), so Petrushka became the prototype for the second-generation, who, ironically, are shown to be in their mid-to-late teens, while most of the first generation are adolescents. Petrushka also had everything she needed to know about her life at the SWA pre-programmed into her brain: she knew where she was, that she would be trained for combat, and that she "must follow Alessandro's and the Agency's orders without hesitation". This also brought on side effects, such as her throwing up whenever she speaks against Alessandro. Furthermore, the conditioning was milder than that received by the previous generation and this has led her to occasionally question the SWA and its war on terrorism — such as at the time when she overheard Jean torturing a suspect. Petrushka also has dreams of herself of the time she was a ballerina and still practices the moves, even though she cannot recall where she learnt them — nor does she associate herself with the dancing girl in her dreams. At the end of the series she is discovered to have developed leukemia and as a result had to be operated on, from a request from Allesandro her conditioning was reversed and she regained her memories of her past, and decides that even without conditioning she loves Allesandro. In the epilogue of the final volume, it is confirmed by Claes that Petrushka dies of leukemia a little more than a year after the end of the Social Welfare Agency. Petrushka's preferred weapons are the Spectre M4 submachine gun and Taurus PT92 pistol. She briefly appears in episode 5 of Gunslinger Girl: Il Teatrino as Elizaveta. She was voiced by Brittney Karbowski.
Gattonero (ガットネーロ, Gattoneero)
Soni (ソニー, Sonii)
Fleccia (フレッチャ, Fureccha)
In Chapter 49, Petrushka returns to her room and talks with three unidentified teenage girls. It is assumed these three are next-generation cyborgs like Petrushka. All three of these girls appear again in Chapter 73, but they remain unnamed. In Chapter 81, the girl with the short black hair operating the sniper rifle is named Gattonero. In Chapter 84, the one with blonde hair and bangs over her eyes is Soni and the redhead with freckles is named Fleccia.
Unidentified Cyborg
There is another cyborg with long dark hair in a ponytail whose handler is killed by Dante, but she is unnamed.

== Cyborg handlers ==
Jose Croce (ジョゼ, Joze)
Voiced by: Hidenobu Kiuchi (Gunslinger Girl), Kozo Mito (Gunslinger Girl: Il Teatrino) (Japanese); John Burgmeier (English)
Jose is an agent in Section 2, Henrietta's handler, and Jean's younger brother. He was previously an officer with the Carabinieri and was the youngest son of the influential public prosecutor Giovanni Croce and defense attorney Carla Croce, Enrica (whom Henrietta strongly resembles). In what would be labeled as the "Croce Incident", Jose's parents, sister and Jean's fiance were murdered when their car was destroyed by a roadside bomb set by Giacomo Dante of the terroristic Padania organization. To avenge his family, Jose and his brother joined the SWA to eradicate Padania, and ultimately kill Giacomo. After joining the SWA, Jose was initially adamant against treating the children the agency "repaired" as mere tools of vengeance, and is quite aware of their propensity for feeling emotion and pain, as well as each having a separate consciousness. However, as the series progress, he grows tired of treating Henrietta nicely as it is emotionally draining. After hunting down Giacomo, the terrorist responsible for his family's deaths and losing one of his eye, Jose grows detached from Henrietta, even allowing the SWA to "reset" Henrietta without caring about the consequences. During the SWA attack at the New Turin nuclear power station after Giacomo and his followers take control of the plant, Jose was accidentally shot and mortally wounded by a panicked Henrietta as she has a flashback of her past. Knowing that she will not be able to live happily if he is dead, He also feels dying by her hand wouldn't be so bad. Jose then reminds her of their vacation to Sicily and what she had said. With Jose pointing his gun at her eye and Henrietta with hers at his head, they enter into a suicide pact and together they pull their triggers.
The name "Giuseppe" is used only in ADV's English adaptation of the manga; in the Japanese-language manga and anime, this character is named Joze (ジョゼ), which has been rendered as Jose and even Giuse for the North American DVD release from FUNimation. Both forms have the same meaning: they are translations of the name "Joseph." Although in flashback of Enrika Croce, Carla mentioned Jose as Gioseffo when she told her daughter to invite his brother to her football match replacing her.
Jean Croce (ジャン, Jan)
Voiced by: Mitsuru Miyamoto (Gunslinger Girl), Takehito Koyasu (Gunslinger Girl: Il Teatrino) (Japanese); Eric Vale (English)
An agent of Section 2, Rico's handler and Jose's older brother. Jean is also the leader of the handlers and a trusted advisor to Director Lorenzo, the head of the department. Jean's childhood was strongly influenced by his grandfather, a hero of the Italian resistance movement in World War II. His father, a leading anti-terrorist prosecutor, wanted him to become a lawyer, but Jean wished to enroll in a military academy and then join the Army. His service with the Carabinieri, which includes both civilian and military work, may have been a compromise. Jean became engaged to Sophia Durante, a fellow Carabinieri soldier, who was later killed in the car bomb that also claimed his parents and sister. Determined on revenge, Jean joined Section 2 which also included his brother Jose. Whereas Jose shows affection and concern for Henrietta — treating her like the little sister he loved so much — Jean looks upon Rico as simply a tool for vengeance — a means to an end. Jean's desire for revenge defines his being: he lives only to kill terrorists and is not above torturing them either. Rescuing innocent hostages is the least of his problems as long as he can kill the terrorists who took them. Jean can occasionally be quite brutal towards Rico: leaving her with a bleeding lip after he got angry with her; and pushing her aside in frustration when, due to an error of judgement on his part and through no fault of hers, his enemy Giacomo Dante escaped, leaving a trail of death and destruction behind him. During the attack at the Turin power plant, Dante takes Jean as a human shield after Rico is about to shoot him but Jean orders Rico to shoot anyway, severely wounding Jean and Dante, knocking Dante back to and through the hole in the wall the shot created and falling down crashing into some scaffold below. He is later found and captured by Julia Aprea. After being shot, Jean apologizes to Rico on how he treated her and tells her to live on without him.
Victor Hilshire (ヒルシャー, Hirushā)
Voiced by: Masashi Ebara (Gunslinger Girl), Masaya Matsukaze (Gunslinger Girl: Il Teatrino) (Japanese); Dameon Clarke (Gunslinger Girl), J. Michael Tatum (Gunslinger Girl: Il Teatrino) (English)
Victor Hartman was a Europol detective from Germany tasked with inter-departmental liaison at Interpol HQ. He wanted to join the Child Abuse Regulations Section to help expose a child-torture group operating in Holland. However, his boss denied him the request on the grounds that he was "too soft" to deal with the sort of cases that the team came up with. Later approached by Rachelle Belleut, the two decided to investigate a warehouse where torture sessions were rumored to take place. They received information concerning the child smuggling ring from Mario Bossi, a Camorra leader who had experienced an attack of conscience. In the course of rescuing a girl from a snuff movie, Rachelle was mortally wounded. Hartman and Bossi managed to rescue the girl and get her to hospital where she fell into a coma as a result of her experiences. The two men thus took her to Italy for treatment at the Social Welfare Agency, fooling the Dutch police who needed her in Holland as part of their case. Only later did Hartman discover that the girl, now called Triela, was to become a brainwashed killing machine. He was outraged but gave in to Jean Croce's coercion and agreed to become her handler, changing his name to Hilshire in order to cover his tracks.
Hilshire develops a very strong bond with Triela, and is increasingly worried about shortening her life-span due to repairs and re-conditioning. Eventually, he vows to devote himself to protecting her and keeping her alive as long as possible. He follows through on this to the very end, when he voluntarily dies with Triela in the New Turin power plant siege, after she is mortally wounded and surrounded by the RF forces. Later, it is revealed that in anticipation of such an end, Hilshire had preserved some of Triela's eggs, in order to give her a symbolic 'second chance' at life.
Claudio Raballo (ラバロ, Rabaro)
Voiced by: Kenyū Horiuchi (Japanese); Bill Flynn (English)
A former Captain in the Carabinieri, discharged due to a leg injury, he was approached by Jean Croce to serve as Claes' handler. In return, Jean would ensure Raballo's reinstatement to the Carabinieri after three years. During his time in Section 2, Raballo and Claes partook of activities outside the SWA, especially fishing. He also taught Claes the value of patience and rekindled her prior love of reading. However, some incidents led him to question the cyborg program and the way the girls were being used. He left the agency and contacted a friend who was a newspaper reporter, but Raballo was then said to have been killed in a rather fortuitous hit-and-run.
Marco Toni (マルコー, Marukō)
Voiced by: Norihiro Inoue (Gunslinger Girl), Kazuki Yao (Gunslinger Girl: Il Teatrino) (Japanese); Jim Foronda (English)
An agent of Section 2 and Angelica's handler, Marco Toni suffered an injury to his left eye, which resulted in his suspension from the Central Security Operations Service (NOCS) of the Polizia di Stato. His friend, Dr. Bianchi, recommended Marco to serve as Angelica's handler. To help Angelica adjust to her new surroundings and all the surgeries, he created a fairy tale titled Il Principe del Regno della Pasta ("The Prince of the Land of Pasta") about a prince who ate only pasta. This fascinated his girlfriend at the time, Patricia, who later wrote and published an actual book based on the story. The conditioning process changed Angelica's personality and effectiveness and her memories could become random: she would remember some events and forget others. This caused Marco to no longer feel any attachment for her, though after her near death he felt regret over how he treated her. After Angelica was allowed back onto the field, he was still somewhat distant from her. Near the end, he reestablished the attachment that he used to have for her.
Lauro (ラウーロ, Raūro)
Voiced by: Eisuke Tsuda (Japanese); Robert McCollum (English)
An agent of Section 2 and Elsa's handler, little was said or shown about him in the manga other than he didn't show her much attention, but Jean noted they were an excellent fratello. In the anime, Lauro was shown as being almost abusive towards Elsa, treating her with disrespect and disinterest. The anime also stated that Lauro joined Section 2 for the money because he had debts he needed to pay off and saw it only as a job, not as a cause. His lack of affection towards her caused Elsa to kill him before committing suicide.
Alessandro "Sandro" Ricci (アレッサンドロ, Aressandoro)
As a boy, Alessandro Ricci's hobby was to observe people from a distance and figure out who they were and what they did from their appearance and body language. This brought him to the attention of a woman called Rossana who recruited him to the Public Security Division. Sandro was trained in surveillance and intelligence-gathering. As part of his missions he would seduce and bed the female relatives and associates of the activists he was targeting and this earned him a reputation in the department as something of a gigolo. There is some indication that he and Rossana had an affair. Her influence led Sandro to adopting a similar lifestyle to hers: a sparesely-furnished apartment filled with books and other material with which to do research on people and their habits. An example of this was when he had an informal chat at a hospital with a Russian ballerina, took down notes and returned to his flat in order to research the profession and increase his own knowledge into life in general. Sandro was assigned to Section 2 to become a handler to the first of a new generation of cyborgs. He showed little interest in touring hospitals and checking on potential recruits and told his colleagues that they could pick whichever girl they liked and do anything to her before he took over as handler. This included a certain amount of plastic surgery and Sandro's only condition was that she should not be a redhead (a possible reference to Rossana who had recently disappeared and gone into hiding). Surgeon Louis Duvalier overlooked this condition, probably to get back at Sandro and his lack of interest or apparent commitment. The new cyborg was named Petrushka and Sandro trained in her in the application of make-up, disguise, surveillance and taking an enemy by surprise by feigning friendlyness. He also encouraged her to smoke and swear — though when, at his request, she tried to insult him personally, a side-effect of the conditioning made her suffer a nervous breakdown. Sandro and Petra have become close over time, and there is even some indication of a budding romance between the young couple.
Bernardo (ベルナルド, Berunardo)
Voiced by: Yuto Nakano (Japanese); Duncan Brannan (English)
An agent of Section 2 and Beatrice's handler, whom he appears to be fond of despite her lack of emotion. Unlike his cyborg charge, Bernardo is shown in both the manga and anime as a gregarious and outgoing person.
Earnest (アーネスト, Earnesto)
Pia's handler, he turns rogue and attempts to deliver his cyborg Pia to Padania. Like his cyborg, Earnest is present only in the PS2 videogame.
Other Handlers
In Chapter 82, a handler named Kraman is introduced, but he's buried under a pile of rubble. His unnamed cyborg attempts to extricate him, but is wounded.
In Chapter 84, the handlers for the three Section 2 girls first introduced in Chapter 49 are identified and given names. The female handler is named Fio, and her cyborg is Soni. Yarow is the handler for Gattonero and Lupa is the handler for Fleccia. An unidentified handler (for the cyborg with long dark hair in a ponytail) is killed by Dante.

== Social Welfare Agency staff ==
=== Section 1 ===
Draghi (ドラーギ, Dorāgi)
Voiced by: Tetsuo Kamura (Japanese); Ed Blaylock (English)
Chief of Special Ops, Section 1. Jealous of the initial success of the cyborg program implemented by Section 2, he once attempted to cast doubt on the feasibility of the program via the investigation into the death of Elsa de Sica.
Pietro Fermi (ピエトロ・フェルミ, Pietoro Ferumi)
Voiced by: Shuichi Ikeda (Japanese); Christopher Sabat (English)
A male agent for Section 1. He was called in to investigate the deaths of Elsa deSica and Lauro, as well as find information on the child assassins employed by Section 2.
Elenora Gabrielli (エレノラ・ガブリエリ, Erenora Gaburieri)
Voiced by: Risa Mizuno (Japanese); Ashley Gonzales (English)
A female agent for Section 1. She often kept track of minor details for Section 1 and kept a Moleskine pocketbook with everything she needed written inside, which Henrietta referred to as a "magical notebook".

=== Section 2 ===
Pieri Lorenzo (ピエリ･ロレンツォ, Pieri Rorentso)
Voiced by: Hiroshi Yanaka (Japanese); Mark Stoddard (English)
Chief of Special Ops, Section 2. He is responsible for overseeing the overall development of the child assassins, as well as the handling of their missions. When looking over sensitive issues, Lorenzo often confers with Jean.
Ferro (フェッロ, Ferro)
Voiced by: Rie Nakagawa (Japanese); Cynthia Cranz (English)
A female agent for Section 2 who has a no-nonsense personality.
Olga (オリガ, Origa)
Voiced by: Julie Mayfield (English)
A female agent for Section 2 who is originally from Russia and was employed at the Russian embassy before joining the agency. She has often expressed the view that the girls would make excellent ballerinas.
Priscilla (プリシッラ, Purishirra)
Voiced by: Masami Suzuki (Gunslinger Girl), Mayuko Takahashi (Gunslinger Girl: Il Teatrino) (Japanese); Colleen Clinkenbeard (English)
A former officer of the Guardia di Finanza and now an agent for Section 2 who loves and genuinely cares for the girls and Angelica in particular. She has a chirpy personality when not on duty. She seems to have a better understanding of the dynamics among the various fratelli. Her function in Section 2 revolves primarily around collecting data.
Alfonso (アルフォンソ, Arufonso)
Voiced by: Masami Iwasaki (Japanese); Troy Baker (English)
A male agent for Section 2. He uses a Floro MK-9 submachine gun.
Amadeo (アマデオ, Amadeo)
Voiced by: Takeshi Maeda (Gunslinger Girl), Yoshimasa Hosoya (Gunslinger Girl: Il Teatrino) (Japanese); David Stroh (Gunslinger Girl), Z. Charles Bolton (Gunslinger Girl: Il Teatrino) (English)
A male agent for Section 2 and former Marine. He refers to himself as "The Agent of Love".
Giorgio (ジョルジオ, Jorujio)
Voiced by: Hirofumi Shimozaki (Japanese); Scott Freeman (English)
A male agent for Section 2, it was mentioned that he used to serve in the Army, the anime specified that he was an officer. Voiced by Mike McFarland in Season 1
Nihad (ニハド, Nihado)
Voiced by: Tuichi Tsuchiya
A male agent for Section 2.

=== Technology department ===
Dr. Fernando Bianchi (ビアンキ, Bianki)
Voiced by: Takumi Yamazaki (Japanese); Chuck Huber (English)
The head doctor in charge of the child assassins' surgical operations. Dr. Bianchi also observes the medical diagnosis and physical development of the girls, and acts as a counselor to them.
Dr. Giliani (ジリアーニ, Jiriāni)
The head doctor in charge of developing artificial arms and legs of the cyborg's body.
Dr. Donato (ドナト, Donato)
Member of the surgical team. Replaced Triela's leg in Volume 4.
Dr. Adamo Belisario (ベリサリオ, Berisario)
Oversees the conditioning processes used on the cyborgs. Holds four doctorates.
Dr. Belgonzi (ベルゴンツィ, Berugontsi)
Voiced by: Masakazu Suzuki (Japanese); Vic Mignogna (English)
Technician officer, expert on artificial organs and the vascular system. Performed some of the body design for Petrushka with Dr. Giliani.
Louis Duvalier (ルイ・デュヴァリエ, Rui Duvarie)
Technical officer who works on designing the outsides of the cyborg's body. The name implies that he is of French origin. He is assisted by a pair of twin girls who talk in unison and even make the same moves. Louis was in charge of modifying Petrushka's physical appearance and probably deliberately gave her red hair to irritate Alessandro because of his non-committal attitude and because his only request concerning his cyborg was that she should not have such a hair colour.
Marianna (マリアンナ, Marianna)
Technician officer and neurologist. She keeps track of the mental deterioration the conditioning drugs have on the girls.

=== Public Security ===
Reschiglian (レスキリアン, Resukirian)
Director of the Public Security department.
Rossanna (ロッサーナ, Rossāna)
A red-headed ex-member of Section 1. She was the best spy in Italy in her time, and mentored Sandro. She could impersonate 100 people, speak various languages, and was an exceptional athlete. At one point during her career, she started a relationship with Sandro, but suddenly left mysteriously and was proclaimed a traitor. As a result, Sandro claimed to hate red-heads from then on. Sandro later discovered that she left after becoming pregnant while working "undercover" on a male suspect and that she and her daughter were living on a small farm. Sandro and Petra subsequently helped Rossanna flee the country when they became targets of assassins sent by the child's father, now a leading politician.

== Others ==
Renato Pisano (レナート・ピサノ, Renato Pisano)
The Prime Minister of Italy.
Monica Petris (モニカ・マリア・ペトリス, Monika Maria Petorisu)
The Minister of Defense for Italy. She also oversees the Social Welfare Agency special operations divisions and their use of federal funds.
Enrica Croce (エンリカ, Enrica)
Voiced by: Kana Akutsu (Japanese); Britney Karbowski (English)
The younger sister of Jose and Jean Croce. She was especially close to Jose who took the trouble of being with her as much as possible since she tended to be neglected by their career-minded parents and sibling. She was killed with her parents in a roadside bombing carried out by Giacomo Dante under the direction of Cristiano. Even in death she maintains something of a hold over her brothers: when much the worse for drink, both Jean and Jose have seen her as a ghost, criticizing the fact that Jose is turning Henrietta into a virtual replacement for her and putting his need for a younger sister over justice for his slaughtered family.
Sophia Durante (ソフィア•ドゥランテ, Sofia Durante)
A corporal in the Carabinieri, she pursues Jean Croce and becomes his fiancee. She is killed along with the Croce family in the bombing.
Rachelle Belleut (ラシェル・ベロー, Rasheru Berō)
Voiced by: Yuka Komatsu (Japanese); Gwendolyn Lau (English)
A former member of the Paris Police Department, who was working as a coroner at Europol headquarters in The Hague at the time of her appearance in the story. She performed the autopsies on the victims of a child-torture ring, but was unable to glean any clues from their bodies. Her co-worker Paulin introduced her to Hilshire, who had unsuccessfully been trying to get added to the group investigating the child-torture ring. Over dinner, Rachelle and Hilshire decided to investigate an Amsterdam warehouse said to be used to film the child-torture based on information provided by Mario Bossi. She was critically wounded in a shoot-out in the warehouse and gave her life saving the girl who would become Triela; Triela remembers her face (woman with eyeglasses) and perfume as a mother image.
Roberta Guellfi (ロベルタ・グェルフィ, Roberuta Guelfi)
A public prosecutor working on the murder of the Croce family. Targeted by Padania, she is protected by Hilshire, Triela, Alessandro and Petrushka. Afterwards, she and Hilshire start seeing each other and enter into a relationship.
Mario Bossi (マリオ・ボッシ, Mario Bossi)
Voiced by: Yuichi Nagashima (Japanese); Kyle Hebert (English)
A Camorra gangster, Bossi was involved in the smuggling of children to Amsterdam as part of an abusive trade that included snuff movies. However, he turned against his colleagues when some of their victims began to remind him of his own daughter. Confronted by Victor Hartman and Rachelle Belleut, he helped them rescue a girl from the making of a snuff film, during which Belleut was killed. The rescued girl was seriously injured, both physically and psychologically. Hartman knew of advanced medical facilities in Italy but the Dutch police needed the girl for their case against the smugglers. Bossi used his skills as a con-man and knowledge of the underworld to again help smuggle the girl out of the country but for what he and Hartman originally thought would be for the best. Later, on the run from both the law and the mob, he was captured in Naples by Hartman and the girl, who now formed the Hilshire-Triela SWA fratello. Bossi ably gave them the slip only to be captured by mob men, but was subsequently saved by Triela. Bossi was in Naples to see his daughter whom he had long neglected so, in exchange for a promise to testify in court, Triela allowed him to leave. While Bossi was giving evidence at a mob trial, Hilshire and Triela were assigned as bodyguards to his teenage daughter Maria "Mimi" Machiavelli (voiced by Taya Fujimori (Japanese)/Kate Oxley (English)). The death of Angelica made Hilshire more protective towards Triela and, during another mission to Naples, he himself carried out an assassination without her and got seriously injured in the process. This caused Triela to run out on him. She then met Bossi, who was now living full-time with Mimi, and he told her the whole story about her rescue in Amsterdam. She later returned to Hilshire.

== Five Republics Faction members ==
The Five Republics Faction is a covert radical nationalist and right-wing group dedicated to the independence of northern Italy, as well as the opposition of globalization in Italy. This group is also referred to as Padania, after a valley in northern Italy formed by the Po River.

Cristiano (クリスティアーノ, Kurisutiāno)
Voiced by: Naoki Tatsuta (Gunslinger Girl), Yūji Ueda (Gunslinger Girl: Il Teatrino) (Japanese); John Swasey (English)
Cristiano Savonarola was the executive in charge of Padania operations in the province of Milan. A patriot at heart, Cristiano had a deep respect for Italian culture, history, and political ideals. Before he joined the Five Republics Faction, he was a low-level lieutenant for an unknown Italian crime syndicate. During that time, he befriended a former CIA agent known only as "John Doe" and encountered the boy who would later become Pinocchio (see below). Cristiano was directly responsible for a number of critical Padania missions, such as the assassination of Filippo Adani and the shutdown of the Messina Bridge project. In the months before his disappearance, Cristiano was blamed for the many major failures his operations experienced. As a result, a rival faction of Padania betrayed the location of his hideout to the Italian government in exchange for "certain conditions". Cristiano was resigned to his fate until Pinocchio convinced him to attempt escape. During the attempt by Section 2 to arrest Cristiano, he was briefly (and barely) rescued by Franca and Franco in an attempted getaway by car. Moments later, their car crashed and fell into a nearby river after Franca, who was driving the car, was shot several times by Angelica. Cristiano is later shown to be alive, but paralyzed and has to communicate by a computer. He hires Giacomo Dante to wipe out the Social Welfare Agency to avenge Pinocchio's, Franca's and Franco's death. He is finally captured by the Social Welfare Agency after the New Turin incident, and he is convinced to sell out the original perpetrators behind the Croce killings.
Franca (フランカ, Furanka)
Voiced by: Chisa Yokoyama (Gunslinger Girl), Eriko Hirata (Gunslinger Girl: Il Teatrino) (Japanese); Stephanie Young (English)
Franca was the codename of an expert on bombs and explosive materials who worked as a freelancer with her partner Franco (see below). An idealist by nature, Franca had strong morals and disliked those who would kill indiscriminately. As a team, Franca and Franco were known within Padania for the quality of their bombs, which were said to be impossible to disarm. Some within the Five Republics Faction do not trust them because of their freelancer status. They operated an auto repair shop in Milan as a front for their clandestine business. Franca's true identity was Caterina, a student who dropped out of her university in order to file a national lawsuit against the arrest of her father, who was imprisoned on charges of unspecified crimes. Shortly afterward, the father died of suspicious causes during his incarceration. Convinced of her father's innocence and angry at the Italian government's apparent immoral attempts to silence political dissent, Caterina sought out various activists within Italy in an attempt to learn how to get revenge on the Italian government. At the recommendation of Mangello Marinov, a family friend, Caterina made contact with Franco, whose uncle was a well-known explosives expert. Although Franco was reluctant at first, he was soon moved by the strength of Caterina's convictions. Caterina learned much from Franco and eventually took the name "Franca" as a cover identity since she would be working closely with Franco from then on. When Padania began the mission to stop the construction of the Messina bridge, Pinocchio was assigned as a bodyguard to Franca and Franco, both of whom would make the bomb to stop the construction if the abduction of Chairwoman Isabella D'Angelo failed. After the encounter with Triela and Hilshire in Montalcino, the three Padania agents went into hiding at a winery in Frascati for several months. When Section 2 moved in to arrest Christiano, Franca and Franco joined Pinocchio in his attempt to help Christiano escape the authorities as a favor. Barely rescuing Christiano from Rico, Franca and Franco then attempted to escape by car. However, after Angelica shot Franca several times, their car crashes into a nearby river. It's later revealed that she died with Franco and Pinocchio in this incident, leaving only Cristiano alive, paralyzed and resolved to exact revenge on the Agency.
Franco (フランコ, Furanko)
Voiced by: Shintarou Sonooka (Gunslinger Girl), Hiroki Yasumoto (Gunslinger Girl: Il Teatrino) (Japanese); Mike McFarland (English)
Franco was an expert on bombs and explosive materials who worked as a freelancer with his partner Franca (see above). Normally a jaded, sullen, and unhappy individual, Franco came to rely on Franca as a reason to stay alive and fight for a cause. Little of Franco's background is revealed other than the fact that he had helped his uncle, a noted explosives expert, in the production of various types of bombs and chemical explosives. After his uncle's death, Franco no longer felt the need to live until he was visited a month later by a young woman named Caterina. Impressed by Caterina's resolve to change Italy for the better, Franco taught her his trade. It would be because of Caterina, later known as Franca, that Franco continued to supply explosives to activists as his uncle once did. It's later revealed that he died with Franca and Pinocchio leaving only Cristiano alive, paralyzed and resolved to exact revenge on the Agency.
Pinocchio (ピノッキオ, Pinokkio)
Voiced by: Daisuke Kishio (Japanese); Jerry Jewell (English)
Pinocchio was a professional assassin with a near-fanatical devotion to his foster father, Christiano. Much like his namesake, Pinocchio wanted to repay the old man (in this case, Christiano) who "created" him. Years ago, Christiano and "John Doe", a former CIA agent, eliminated the Polacco family in their own house. Later, they found an unknown boy, speculated to be "merchandise" of the Polacco family, in a hidden cellar of the house. Although he originally intended to use the boy as a "bargaining chip", Christiano eventually decided to raise the boy as his own. Personally educated by Christiano and taught the skills of an assassin by "John Doe", the boy, now named Pinocchio, committed his first murder at the age of ten. Pinocchio conducted many high-profile assassinations on his foster father's behalf, including the murders of eight politicians, five judges, and four financiers of the Italian government. Encountered by Triela in the town of Montalcino, Pinocchio's extraordinary reflexes, speed, and martial arts mastery allowed him to defeat her in hand-to-hand combat despite the cyborg's enhanced strength and speed (as well as her own expertise in martial arts), but he remembered his first assassination and decided not to kill Triela while she lay unconscious. As a result of this incident, Triela considered Pinocchio a personal enemy. Several months later, Franca told Pinocchio of Section 2's plans to arrest Christiano. Despite his orders to stay with Franca and Franco, Pinocchio went to his foster father's home in an attempt to convince him to escape or, failing that, defend him to the death. At the last minute, Christiano finally decided to escape so Pinocchio decided to cover for him. After this, Pinocchio encountered Triela again and was killed in a fierce duel of guns and hand-to-hand combat with her, stabbed through the throat by Triela's cybernetic fingers. Cristiano later hires Giacomo Dante to avenge Pinocchio.
Giacomo Dante (ジャコモ ダンテ, Jakomo Dante)
A Padania terrorist who had been living abroad and recently return to Italy after Cristiano's assassination attempt. An ex-mercenary, Giacomo is a tactical genius who loves the thrill of battle and thus does not believe in the cause of the Padania movement, only joining them to soothe his bloodlust of war. Jose and Jean seeks revenge against him as he was the one responsible for the bombings that killed their family and Jean's fiance, Sophia Durante. After his return, he unites the various Padania factions against their common enemy, the Social Welfare Agency and in their first act, and take over the Belltower of St. Marks in Venice and threatens to blow it up with a missile they smuggled inside, unless the government release Aaron Cicero and his comrades. But unknown to the Government and the SWA, the siege is actually a trap in order to kill the cyborgs using new heavy weaponry, which they succeed dealing major casualties against them despite suffering the same fate as well and the Belltower saved. The siege becomes a boost of morale for the Padanian movement who join Giacomo's banner and with Cristiano orders, Giacomo leads a campaign of bombings at cities across Italy and takes over a nuclear power plant outside of Turin and demand that the government dismantle the Social Welfare Agency. He learns the hard way that not even a handler makes an effective shield when, on Jean's orders, Rico shoots them both with an anti-material rifle. Dante survives and is imprisoned when the series ends.
Enrico Beldini
Voiced by: Kei Majima (Japanese); Andrew Rye (English)
A former anarchist who joined the PRF for money offered. A man who believed that the ends justified the means, Enrico once planned to blow up the Piazza di Spagna in a terrorist plot with a bomb designed by Franca and Franco. He was arrested by Section 2 after he was followed to his hideout and currently remains imprisoned.
Pirazzi
A well-known Italian billionaire who secretly funds the activities of the PRF. He was betrayed by his former accountant, Filippo Adani, who gave Pirazzi's accounting records (including details of the PRF's finances and future plans) to the Agency.
Bruno
Voiced by: Akimitsu Takase (Japanese); Cole Brown (English)
Known within the PRF as "the Fixer", this man is usually sent to destroy unwanted corpses the PRF leaves behind. Bruno works closely with his apprentice, Vincenzo, in this job. A family man, Bruno only does his job for the money offered by the PRF. In volume three, he was left alive proceeding Rico and Angelica's mission; his current state is unknown.
Vincenzo
Voiced by: Takeshi Maeda (Japanese); Joel McDonald (English)
Bruno's apprentice in the odious job of disposal of human corpses. As with Bruno, Vincenzo does his job only for the money. He was killed by Rico in volume three of the manga during the mission by Rico and Angelica.
Leonardo Conti
Voiced by: Toshitsugu Takashina (Japanese); Phil Parsons (English)
Was the self-proclaimed "handsome and excellent journalist" who works with Marco's ex-girlfriend Patricia at Ultima magazine. He learned from Patricia that Marco works for the Social Welfare Agency and that she was writing an article on the Agency. Leonardo told Patricia of the rumors that the SWA uses child assassins and offered to co-investigate the Agency with her. They spoke to an incarcerated prisoner who claims that the SWA is the modern version of "Operation Gladio" and is operating to destabilize the rightists and others backing Northern secession. Leonardo continued his digging into the SWA.
Leonardo was set up by the SWA through an intermediary (Colonel Farn). When he showed, Marco tried to place him under arrest, but Patricia appeared and was taken hostage by Leonardo. Angelica appeared and blinded Leonardo with a flashlight on her pistol. When he let go of Patricia to shield his eyes, Angelica shot him.
Nino
Voiced by: Toshihiko Seki (Japanese); Bryan Massey (English)
Once known as the Tibetan Terrier, Nino was once a great kidnapper who was known in the PRF for his precise and non-violent tactics. He was originally hired to capture Mario Bossi's daughter to stop Mario from testifying against the Faction, but realized that what he did was not worth all of the fighting and blood. Nino also worked at a repair shop, and at one time fixed a kaleidoscope belonging to Henrietta. His current whereabouts are unknown.
