= Floro MK-9 =

FIC MK-9
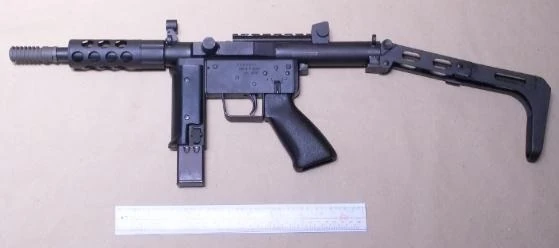
- The MK-9.
- Type: Submachine gun
- Place of origin: Philippines

Service history
- In service: 1997–Present
- Wars: Civil conflict in the Philippines

Production history
- Designer: Floro International Corporation
- Manufacturer: Floro International Corporation
- Produced: Estimated to be 1990s

Specifications
- Mass: 3.18 kg (Empty, MK-9); 2.55 kg (Empty, MP-9); 3.2 kg (With Magazine)
- Length: 64.5 cm (Note: The official MK-9 webpage erroneously reported the measurement as 64.5mm.) (Stock extended, MK-9); 65 cm (Stock extended, MP-9)
- Barrel length: 46 cm (Stock folded, MK-9); 46.5 cm (Stock folded, MP-9)
- Cartridge: 9×19mm Parabellum
- Action: blowback, closed bolt
- Rate of fire: 800-850 rounds/min
- Muzzle velocity: 400 m/s (1,312 ft/s)
- Effective firing range: 100 m (328 ft)
- Feed system: 25 or 32-round magazine
- Sights: Front Sight: Fixed; Rear sight: Adjustable for windage Picatinny railing included

The Floro MK-9 (Note: Jane's Infantry Weapons refers to it as the MK-9N. Other sources sometimes mention the name as MK9.) is a submachine gun designed and formerly manufactured by Floro International Corporation (FIC). The weapon is marketed to local security forces as a low-cost alternative to imported submachine guns.

== History ==
According to Victorino Floro, who was the chairman of FIC in 1996, Gregory Floro approached the Philippine Army in March 1996 for testing and evaluating FIC-made small arms as part of the Self-Reliance Defense Posture (SRDP) program. Two MK-9s were tested and reportedly passed the requirement for a 9mm submachine gun. 75 MK-9s were delivered in two batches on October 6 and 7, 1997. In April 1998, FIC was asked by the Armed Forces of the Philippines's Research and Development Center (AFP RDC) to rework the MK-9s with a heavy buffer assembly. 65 MK-9s were returned to FIC to rework them and were resubmitted in September 1998. In August 2000, FIC was told by the AFP that the 65 MK-9s failed their requirements, but FIC said that they are willing to rework them and were redelivered in January 2001. 10 MK-9s were also delivered at no extra charge to replace the MK-9s that were provided to the AFP Office of the Chief of Staff Security Group in 1997.

In a memo from the Department of the Interior and Local Government (DILG), the MK-9 was mentioned as being documented for potential recovery from ex-rebels and militiamen if and when they were turned in for firearms amnesty.

=== Corruption case ===
The Floro MK-9 was reportedly sold to the AFP in 1997 under a P1,500,000.00 contract where 75 MK-9s were found to be allegedly defective according to a report filed from the Sandiganbayan under the Anti-Graft and Corrupt Practices Act on September 27, 2004. The court cleared Major Jose L. Barao Jr., Captain Henry G. Valeroso, and Victorino R. Floro, then FIC president, on April 27, 2018. Colonel Artemio C. Cacal was cleared of graft after his death.

The Sandiganbayan ruled that prosecutors did not prove the presence of undue injuries from the contract and providing Victorino with benefits.

== Design ==
The MK-9 series is a blowback-operated weapon, made from steel, chambered for the 9×19mm Parabellum cartridge. A black phospate reflective finish is used to coat the submachine gun, although its pistol grip is moulded with a black matt-polymer finish. FIC discontinued plans to use a wooden buttstock for the MK-9.

The MK-9 fires from a closed bolt with a selector switch allowing semi-automatic or full-automatic fire. The upper receiver is a steel tube and the barrel is held in place by the perforated barrel jacket. A suppressor can be used when needed.

The lower receiver and magazine housing consists of sheet metal. The extended magazine well has a plastic hand guard and doubles as a forward grip. It has the Uzi submachine gun-type magazine interface and uses 25 or 30-round Uzi magazines. The MK-9 uses the firing mechanism of the M16.

The cocking handle is on the left side of the upper receiver and incorporated with a dust cover. The front sights are fixed and the rear sights have an adjustment knob for windage. The upper receiver has a Picatinny rail installed, allowing telescopic and red dot sights to be used.

== Variants ==
=== MK-9 ===
Basic version with collapsible stock.

=== MP-9 ===
The MP-9 is a shortened version with a skeletal folding stock and no barrel jacket. It was supposedly known as the Mk-19.

== Users ==
- Philippines:
  - Philippine Navy: Around 100 MK-9s ordered. Known to be used by the Naval Special Operations Command.
  - Philippine Marine Corps: Tested by PMC for use by military police, armored vehicle crews and counter-terrorist units.

=== Former ===
- Philippines: Formerly used by the Anti-Crime Task Force (ACTF), Armed Forces of the Philippines.

== Bibliography ==
- Jones, Richard D.; Ness, Leland S., eds. (2010). Jane's Infantry Weapons 2010-2011. Jane's Publishing. ISBN 978-0710629081.
