= 1955 in Japan =

- Decades: 1930s; 1940s; 1950s; 1960s; 1970s
- See also: Other events of 1955; History of Japan; Timeline; Years

Events in the year 1955 in Japan. It corresponds to Shōwa 30 (昭和30年) in the Japanese calendar.

== Incumbents ==
- Emperor: Hirohito
- Prime Minister: Ichirō Hatoyama
- Chief Cabinet Secretary: Ryutaro Nemoto
- Chief Justice of the Supreme Court: Kōtarō Tanaka
- President of the House of Representatives: Tō Matsunaga until January 24, Shūji Masutani from March 18
- President of the House of Councillors: Yahachi Kawai

=== Governors ===
- Aichi Prefecture: Mikine Kuwahara
- Akita Prefecture: Tokuji Ikeda (until 29 April); Yūjirō Obata (starting 30 April)
- Aomori Prefecture: Bunji Tsushima
- Chiba Prefecture: Hitoshi Shibata
- Ehime Prefecture: Sadatake Hisamatsu
- Fukui Prefecture: Harukazu Obata (until 4 February); Seiichi Hane (starting 26 April)
- Fukuoka Prefecture: Katsuji Sugimoto (until 7 April); Taichi Uzaki (starting 26 April)
- Fukushima Prefecture: Sakuma Ootake
- Gifu Prefecture: Kamon Muto
- Gunma Prefecture: Shigeo Kitano
- Hiroshima Prefecture: Hiroo Ōhara
- Hokkaido: Toshifumi Tanaka
- Hyogo Prefecture: Masaru Sakamoto
- Ibaraki Prefecture: Yoji Tomosue
- Ishikawa Prefecture: Wakio Shibano (until 19 January); Jūjitsu Taya (starting 24 February)
- Iwate Prefecture: Kenkichi Kokubun (until 29 April); Senichi Abe (starting 30 April)
- Kagawa Prefecture: Masanori Kaneko
- Kagoshima Prefecture: Katsushi Terazono
- Kanagawa Prefecture: Iwataro Uchiyama
- Kochi Prefecture: Wakaji Kawamura (until 11 December); Masumi Mizobuchi (starting 12 December)
- Kumamoto Prefecture: Saburō Sakurai
- Kyoto Prefecture: Torazō Ninagawa
- Mie Prefecture: Masaru Aoki (until 18 March); Satoru Tanaka (starting 23 April)
- Miyagi Prefecture: Otogorō Miyagi
- Miyazaki Prefecture: Nagashige Tanaka (until 30 March); Jingo Futami (starting 23 April)
- Nagano Prefecture: Torao Hayashi
- Nagasaki Prefecture: Takejirō Nishioka
- Nara Prefecture: Ryozo Okuda
- Niigata Prefecture: Shohei Okada (until 29 April) Kazuo Kitamura (starting 30 April)
- Oita Prefecture: Tokuju Hosoda (until 27 April); Kaoru Kinoshita (starting 28 April)
- Okayama Prefecture: Yukiharu Miki
- Osaka Prefecture: Bunzō Akama
- Saga Prefecture: Naotsugu Nabeshima
- Saitama Prefecture: Yuuichi Oosawa
- Shiga Prefecture: Kotaro Mori
- Shiname Prefecture: Yasuo Tsunematsu
- Shizuoka Prefecture: Toshio Saitō
- Tochigi Prefecture: Juukichi Kodaira (until 5 January); Kiichi Ogawa (starting 7 February)
- Tokushima Prefecture: Kuniichi Abe (until 30 March); Kikutaro Hara (starting 25 April)
- Tokyo: Seiichirō Yasui
- Tottori Prefecture: Shigeru Endo
- Toyama Prefecture: Kunitake Takatsuji
- Wakayama Prefecture: Shinji Ono
- Yamagata Prefecture: Michio Murayama (until 20 January); Tōkichi Abiko (starting 20 February)
- Yamaguchi Prefecture: Taro Ozawa
- Yamanashi Prefecture: Hisashi Amano

== Events ==
- January 28 – Benesse Corporation was founded, following its predecessor, Fukutake Shoten.
- February 17 – A fire broke out at Seibo no Sono (Our Lady's Garden) in Totsuka-ku, Yokohama. According to a report from Japan Fire and Disaster Management Agency (JFDMA), it resulted in the death of 99 people.
- February 27 – 1955 Japanese general election
- April Unknown date – Bunka Shutter was founded, following its predecessor, Nippon Bunka Steel Door.
- April 7 – Radio Tokyo TV (now Tokyo Broadcasting System Television (TBS)) begins broadcasting.
- April 16–17 – Abe coal mine debris collapse, due to heavy torrential rain hit in Sasebo, Nagasaki Prefecture, resulting in the death of 73 people, according to a confirmed JFDMA report.
- April 21 – Opening of Gokō Station
- May 11 – Shiun Maru disaster
- May 14 – According to a confirmed report from the Japan National Police Agency, a charter bus plunged into the Kitakami River in Iwate Prefecture, resulting in twelve deaths and twenty-eight injured.
- July 28- According to a confirmed JFDMA report, 36 junior school students died when a high wave hit, during a school swimming lesson in Nakakawara beach, Tsu, Mie Prefecture.
- September 3 – Yumiko-chan incident
- November 1 – According to a confirmed JFDMA report, a gas explosion occurred at the Moshiri coal mine in Akabira, Hokkaido. Official death toll is 60, with 17 wounded.
- November 15 – Japan Liberal Party and Democratic Party of Japan were unified, ruling Liberal Democratic Party of Japan has started.
- Establishment of Akkeshi Prefectural Natural Park

== Births ==
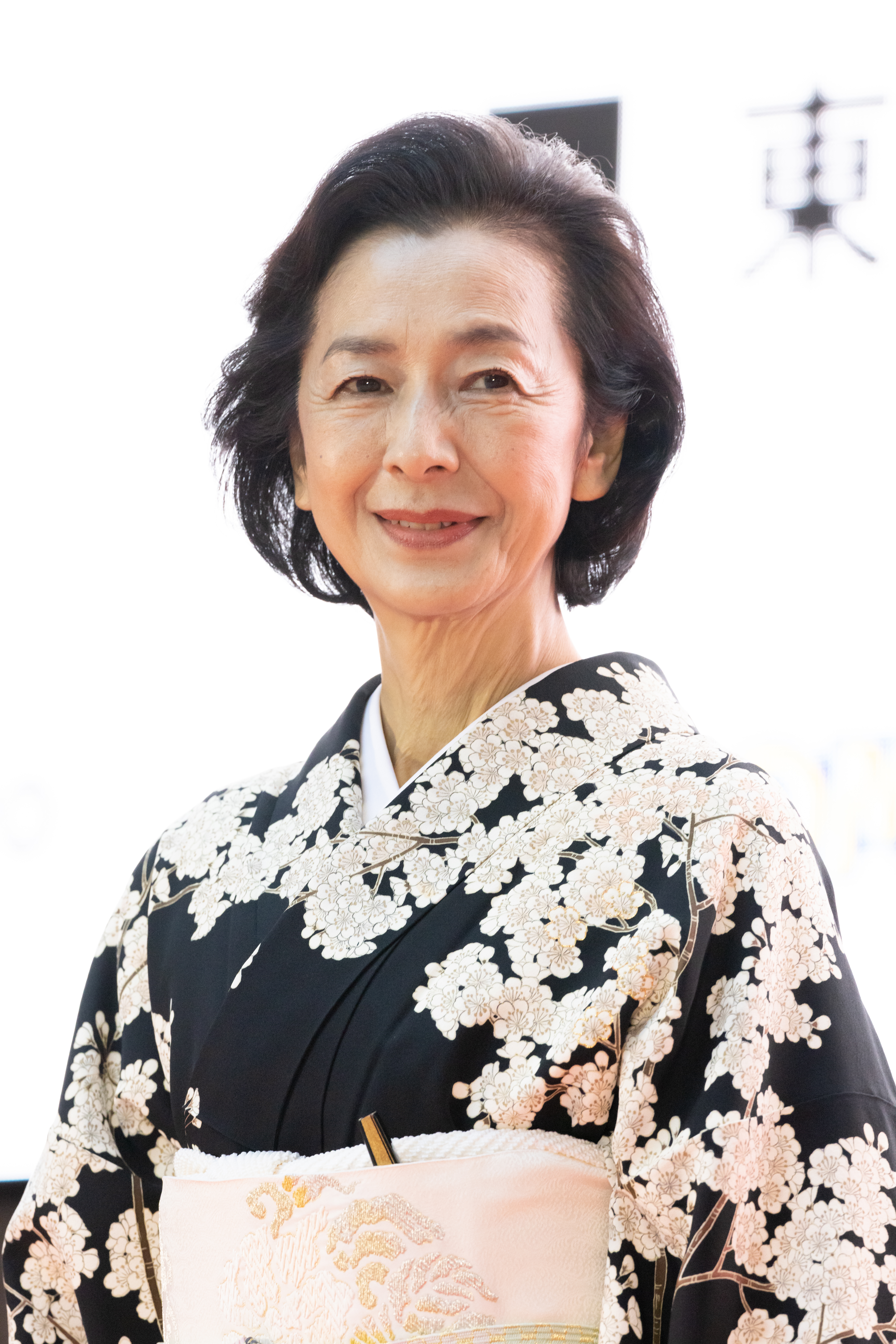
Keiko Takahashi, a Japanese actress

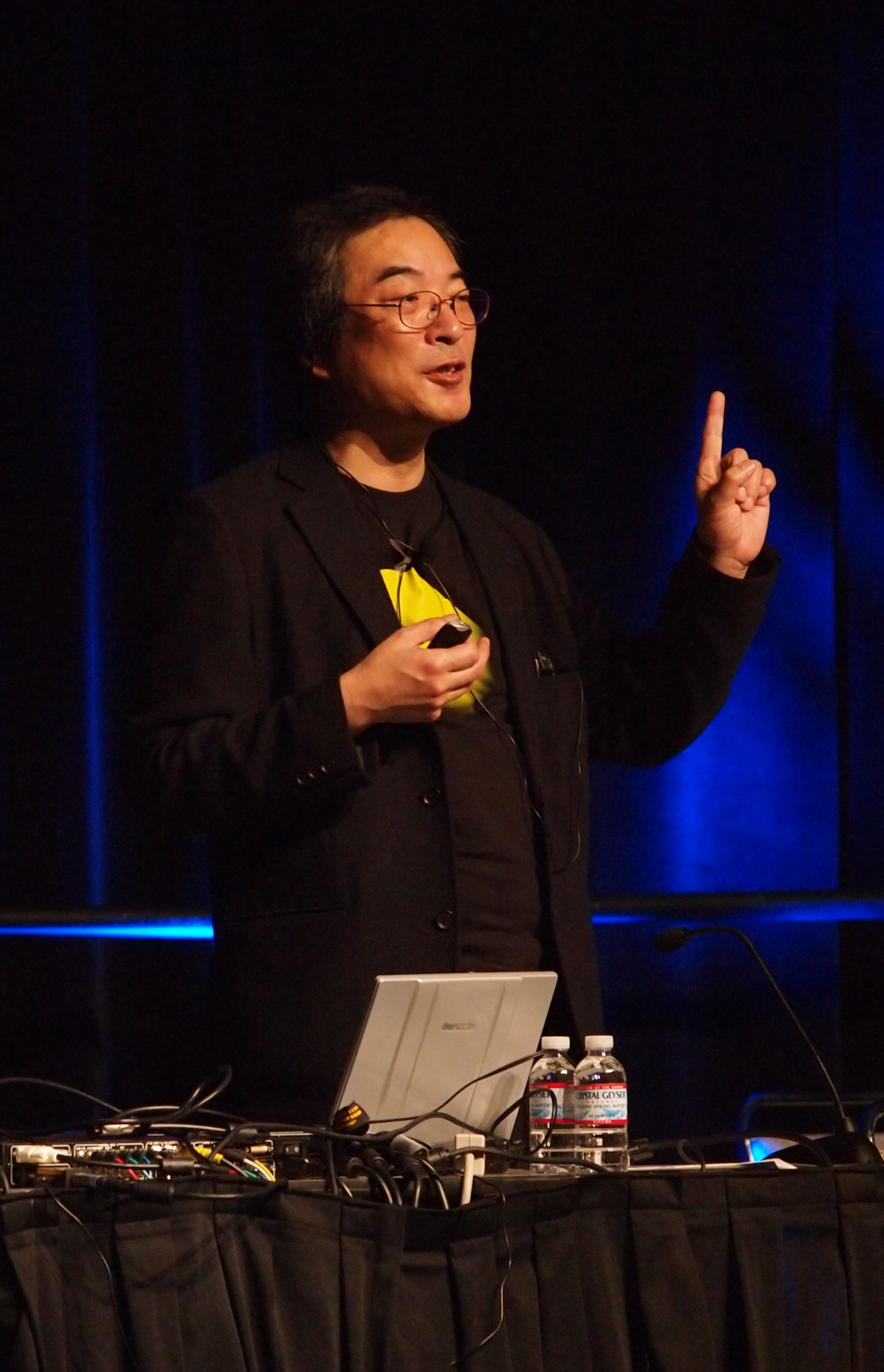
Tōru Iwatani, a Japanese video game designer and creator of Pac-Man

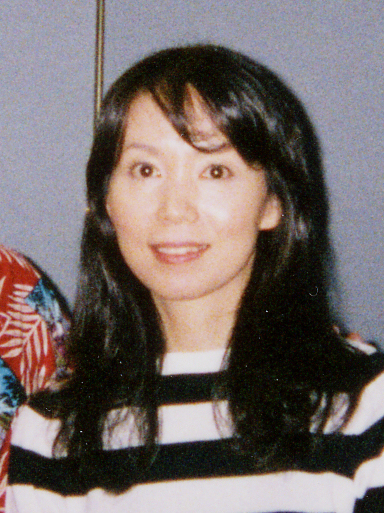
Mariya Takeuchi, a Japanese musician and record producer

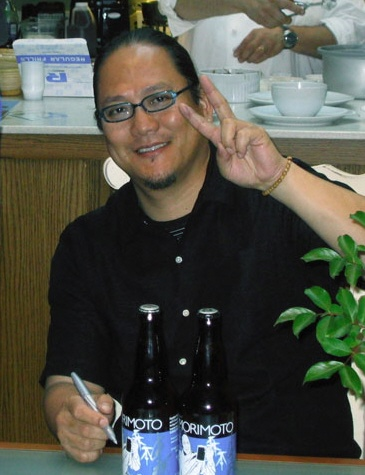
Masaharu Morimoto, a Japanese chef

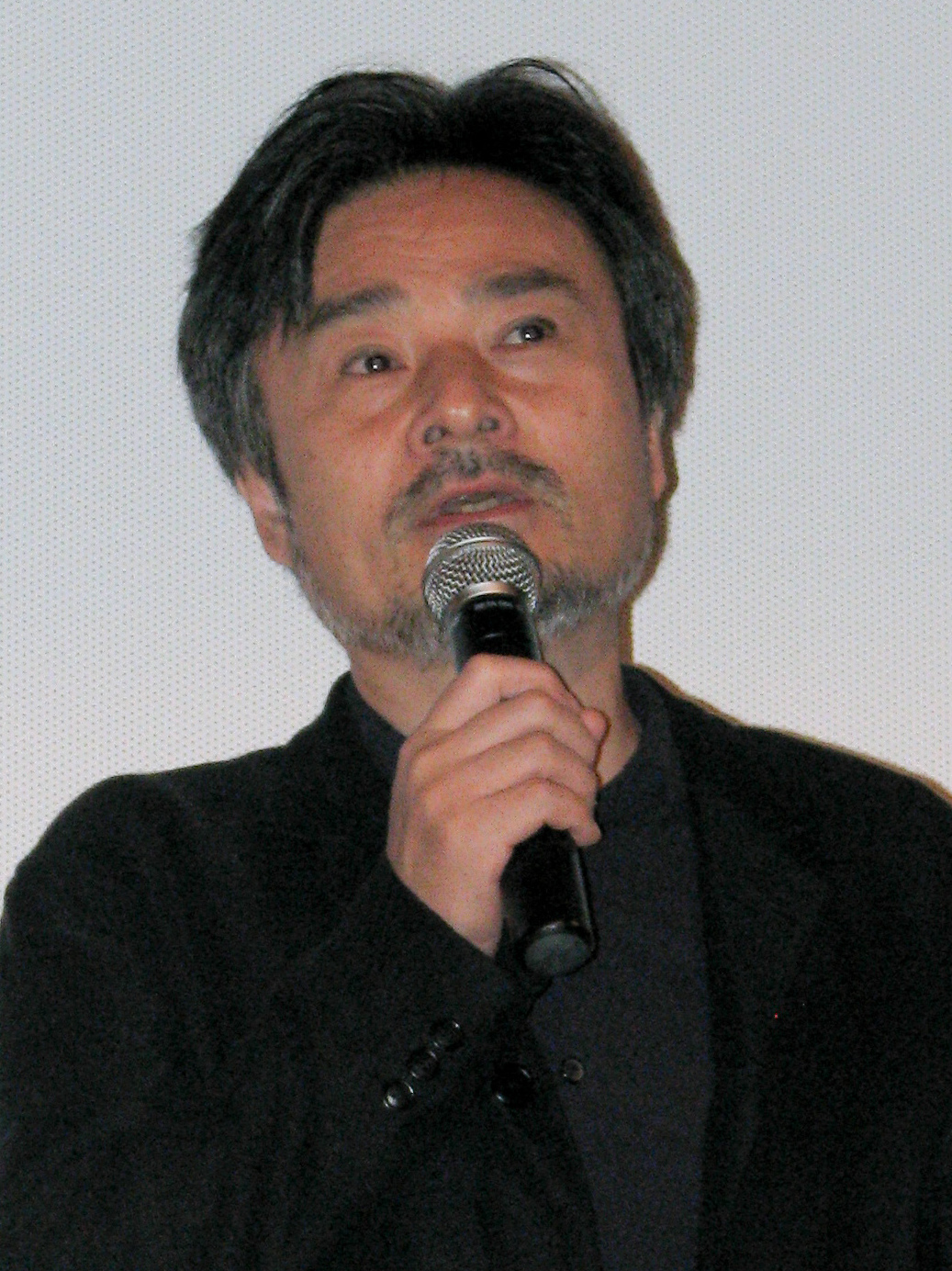
Kiyoshi Kurosawa, a Japanese director, screenwriter, actor, and writer

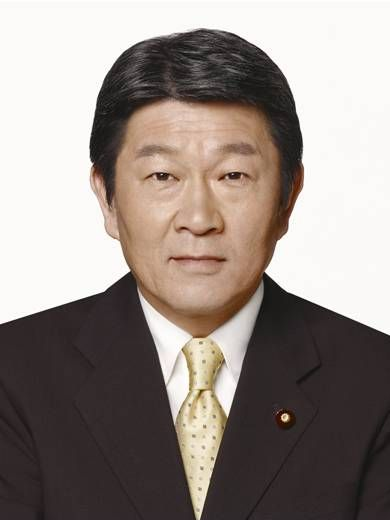
Toshimitsu Motegi, a Japanese politician and Japanese Minister of Foreign Affairs

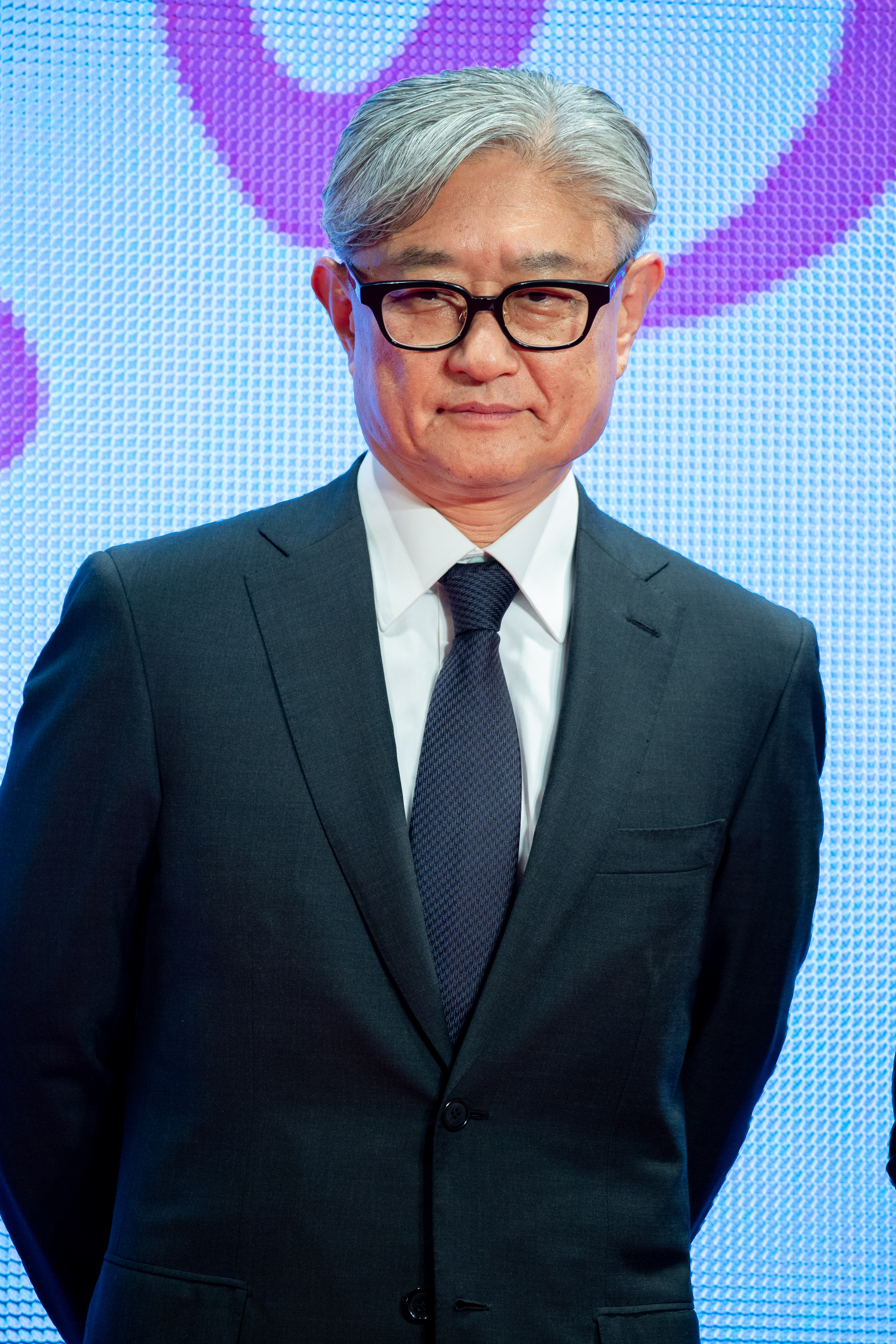
Yukihiko Tsutsumi, a Japanese film director

Many notable Japanese individuals from Young Japanese Baby Boom/Danso Generation were born in 1955, such as Ran Ito, Mayumi Tanaka, Mami Koyama, Hiromi Ōta, Keiko Takahashi, Pac-Man creator Tōru Iwatani, George Tokoro, Setsuko Karasuma, Toshiyuki Watanabe, Kenji Ohba, Emily Hatoyama, Akiko Yano, Toshifumi Hinata, Shirō Sano, Jiro Watanabe, Mariya Takeuchi, Hiroshi Nishihara, Jun Murai, Kazuhiko Fukuoji, Dragon Ball creator Akira Toriyama, Akira Nishino, Hideki Saijo, Yuko Moriguchi, Fumi Hirano, Yūko Tanaka, Suguru Egawa, Masaharu Morimoto, Takashi Naito, Chiyonofuji Mitsugu, Shinobu Sato, Masao Kagawa, Sanma Akashiya, Kiyoshi Kurosawa, Kiyoshi Murota, ABC-Mart founder Masahiro Miki, Eiko Nagashima, Jun Sawada, Hideo Fukuyama, Shinji Hiramatsu, Mayumi Asaka, Takashi Nakamura, Shinbo Nomura, Toshimitsu Motegi, Tetsurō Amino, Hiromi Go, LaSalle Ishii, Yasukazu Hamada, Toshio Hosokawa, Etsuko Shihomi, Yukihiko Tsutsumi, Jun Kunimura, Katsunobu Katō, Yōjirō Takita, Takeshi Masu, Nakamura Baijaku II, Masanori Sera, and Chiharu Matsuyama. Other notable Japanese individuals were Akio Saito, Mayumi Muroyama, and Koichi Nakano.

=== January–March ===
- January 5 – Hiromi Yano, volleyball player
- January 11 – Kenichi Morozumi, actor and voice actor (d. 2022)
- January 13
  - Ran Itō, actress
  - Tomoko Kami, politician
- January 15 – Mayumi Tanaka, voice actress
- January 17 – Mami Koyama, voice actress
- January 20 – Hiromi Ōta, singer
- January 22 – Keiko Takahashi, actress
- January 25 – Tōru Iwatani, video game designer and creator of Pac-Man
- January 28 – George Tokoro, television personality and singer-songwriter
- February 2 – Koshiro Asami, actor
- February 3
  - Setsuko Karasuma, actress and model
  - Toshiyuki Watanabe, musician and composer
- February 5 – Kenji Ohba, actor and stuntman
- February 11 – Emily Hatoyama, essayist and former actress
- February 12 – Ai Satō, voice actress
- February 13 – Akiko Yano, singer-songwriter
- February 16 – Saburo Fujiki, professional golfer
- February 17
  - Masao Yoshida, nuclear engineer
  - Shun Sugata, actor
- February 22 – Junko Mabuki, retired pink film actress
- February 23
  - Akio Saito, former professional baseball player
  - Toshifumi Hinata, musician and composer
- March 1 – Shoji Hano, drummer
- March 2 – Shoko Asahara, cult leader (Aum Shinrikyo) (d. 2018)
- March 4 – Shirō Sano, actor
- March 9 – Juri Yokoyama, volleyball player
- March 16
  - Chieko Kikkawa, gymnast
  - Jiro Watanabe, boxer
- March 18 – Mikiyasu Tanaka, volleyball player
- March 20 – Mariya Takeuchi, musician
- March 21 – Hiroshi Nishihara, chemist
- March 29 – Jun Murai, internet researcher
- March 30
  - Hiroshi Okachi, bobsledder
  - Tadashi Mihara, former professional boxer

=== April–June ===
- April 3 – Kazuhiko Fukuoji, artist
- April 5 – Akira Toriyama, manga artist and creator of Dragon Ball (d. 2024)
- April 7 – Akira Nishino, soccer player and manager
- April 13
  - Hideki Saijo, singer and actor (d. 2018)
  - Yuko Moriguchi, professional golfer
- April 15
  - Ryūtarō Nakamura, anime director (d. 2013)
  - Yasuhiro Funatogawa, professional golfer
- April 23 – Fumi Hirano, voice actress and essayist
- April 29 – Yūko Tanaka, actress
- May 3 – Nobuyuki Kajitani, gymnast
- May 9 – Masayuki Kakefu, former professional baseball player
- May 24 – Rumiko Ukai, voice actress
- May 25 – Suguru Egawa, baseball player
- May 26 – Masaharu Morimoto, chef
- May 28 – Takashi Naito, actor
- May 30 – Nakamura Kanzaburō XVIII, Kabuki actor (d. 2012)
- June 1 – Chiyonofuji Mitsugu, sumo wrestler (58th Yokozuna grand champion) (d. 2016)
- June 5 – Shinobu Sato, classical guitarist
- June 8 – Masao Kagawa, renowned Shotokan karate master
- June 18 – Mariko Fuji, actress
- June 23 – Kazuhito Hashimoto, chemist
- June 26
  - Masaaki Kanagawa, professional golfer
  - Yoko Gushiken, boxer
- June 29 – Yasuhiko Nishimura, Grand Steward of Imperial Household Agency

=== July–September ===
- July 1 – Sanma Akashiya, comedian and actor
- July 12 – Tadashi Miyazawa, voice actor
- July 15 – Takatoshi Nishiwaki, Governor of Kyoto Prefecture
- July 19 – Kiyoshi Kurosawa, director and writer
- July 26
  - Kiyoshi Murota, professional golfer
  - Masahiro Miki, founder of ABC-Mart
- July 28 – Eiko Nagashima, actress
- July 30 – Jun Sawada, businessman and chairman of Nippon Telegraph and Telephone (NTT)
- August 5 – Kaneshige Wakamatsu, politician and accountant
- August 10 – Yaeko Taguchi, hostess one of several kidnapped by North Korea in late 1970s and early 1980s (d. 1978)
- August 13 – Hideo Fukuyama, retired motorsport car race driver
- August 20 – Agnes Chan, television personality
- August 22 – Shinji Hiramatsu, manga artist
- August 30 – Mayumi Muroyama, manga artist
- September 4 – Hiroshi Izawa, actor
- September 5 – Yoshinori Oguchi, politician
- September 6 – Mayumi Asaka, actress
- September 8 – Rikiko Yamanaka, diver
- September 12 – Takashi Nakamura, anime director and animator
- September 15 – Atsuko Tokuda, retired badminton player
- September 20 – Minako Sato, archer
- September 24 – Shinbo Nomura, manga artist

=== October–December ===
- October 7 – Toshimitsu Motegi, politician and Japanese Minister of Foreign Affairs
- October 10 – Tetsurō Amino, anime director
- October 18
  - Hiromi Go, musician
  - Hiroshi Kajiyama, politician
- October 19 – LaSalle Ishii, television personality
- October 21 – Yasukazu Hamada, politician
- October 23 – Toshio Hosokawa, classical music composer
- October 29 – Etsuko Shihomi, actress
- November 3 – Yukihiko Tsutsumi, film director
- November 13 – Yasushi Ueta, track and field athlete
- November 14 – Koichi Nakano, bicycle rider
- November 16 – Jun Kunimura, actor
- November 22 – Katsunobu Katō, politician, three-time Minister of Health, Labor, and Welfare, Chief Cabinet Secretary, and Minister of Finance
- November 26 – Nobuto Hosaka, mayor of Setagaya
- November 28 – Noriko Kosai, sport shooter
- December 2 – Nanami Kino, former handball player
- December 4 – Yōjirō Takita, director
- December 9
  - Asashio Tarō IV, sumo wrestler (d. 2023)
  - Shigeyuki Goto, politician
  - Takeshi Masu, actor
- December 12 – Nakamura Baijaku II, actor, bassist, and music composer
- December 14 – Masanori Sera, musician and actor
- December 15 – Daizou Araki, modern pentathlete
- December 16 – Chiharu Matsuyama, musician
- December 17 – Shinsuke Suematsu, politician
- December 24 – Mizuho Fukushima, politician
- December 29 – Mitsu Shimojo, politician

== Deaths ==
- February 17 – Ango Sakaguchi, author (b. 1906)
- October 15 – Fumio Hayasaka, composer (b. 1914)
- October 25 – Sadako Sasaki, hibakusha (b. 1943)

== See also ==
- 1955 in Japanese football
- List of Japanese films of 1955
