= Nishihara =

Nishihara may refer to:

- Nishihara (surname)
- Nishihara, Okinawa, town in Nakagami District, Okinawa, Japan
- Nishihara, Kumamoto, village in Aso District, Kumamoto, Japan
- Nishihara Station, Astram Line station in Hiroshima, Japan
- Nishihara Loans, series of loans made by the Empire of Japan
