= Sa Gojō =

Sa Gojō (沙悟凈) (occasionally Sha Gojō) can refer to various characters based on Sha Wujing, such as:

- The Japanese name of the Journey to the West character Sha Wujing
- The character "Sandy" in the Monkey TV series
- Sha Gojyo (Saiyuki), in the manga Saiyuki
