= Pearl: The Best Collection =

Greatest hits album by Kokia
- Released: February 1, 2006
- Recorded: 2003–2005
- Genre: J-pop, folk, neoclassical dark wave, bossa nova
- Length: 1:18:48
- Label: Victor Entertainment
- Producer: Kokia

Kokia chronology
Uta ga Chikara (2004)	Pearl: The Best Collection (2006)	Birthday Present (2006)

Singles from Pearl
- 1. "Dandelion" Released: February 23, 2005; 2. "Time to Say Goodbye" Released: July 21, 2005; 3. "Ai no Melody/Chōwa Oto (With Reflection)" Released: January 1, 2006; 4. "Arigatō... (The Pearl Edition)" Released: March 16, 2007

Pearl: The Best Collection (stylised as pearl ～The Best Collection～) is Kokia's first greatest hits album, released on February 1, 2006. It was released simultaneously with her first video clips collection, Jewel: The Best Video Collection.

== Background ==
The album featured material from her time with Mother Land management under Victor Entertainment (2003–2006). In this time, Kokia had released two albums (Remember Me and Uta ga Chikara), along with seven singles. After working with Mother Land, she set up her own personal management company, Anco & Co., and has worked with them ever since.

Three singles were released after Uta ga Chikara, and only feature on Pearl. The first of these, "Dandelion" (released 11 months prior in late February 2005), was used as the ending theme song for a Nippon Television documentary show Super TV Jōhō Saibansen. The second was also featured in a TV show, Kin'yō Entertainment. This single, "Time to Say Goodbye", was released five months after "Dandelion", in July 2005.

The final single was released on New Year's Day in 2006: "Ai no Melody/Chōwa Oto (With Reflection)". The songs were used as the opening and ending theme songs for the animated film Origin: Spirits of the Past. This single was released a month prior to the best collection.

== Conception ==
The idea of releasing a greatest hits album was first suggested to her by her Mother Land director in early 2005, after he noted the number of singles and soundtrack songs Kokia had.

Kokia chose the title "Pearl" due to the secondary meaning of the word as an item of great beauty. She believed it created an image of a pearl necklace, where each of Kokia's songs were created from within her then threaded onto the necklace of her greatest hits album. Kokia also considered the songs to develop inside of herself like how pearls develop in seashells: by developing around something she has on her mind.

The title of Kokia's second greatest hits is thematically related to Pearl, since Kokia named it Coquillage (the French word for shell).

Kokia chose all her songs that were featured in commercials, and combined these with the songs most she wanted people to hear. She chose every track she had released as a single since 2003. From Remember Me, five songs were taken: "I Believe (Umi no Soko Kara)", "Kawaranai Koto (Since 1976)", "The Power of Smile", "Remember the Kiss" and "Watashi no Taiyō". The version of "Remember the Kiss" on the album, "Remember the Kiss (A Wish)", was a previously recorded unreleased version. From Uta ga Chikara, Kokia chose three songs: "So Much Love for You", "Utau Hito" and "Yume ga Chikara".

From the singles released post Uta ga Chikara, all four A-sides are included. "Chōwa Oto (With Reflection)" is a re-recording of "Chōwa Oto" from Kokia's Gai Records Victor Entertainment released album Trip Trip in 2002. Also featured on the album from the singles was the B-side "Shiawase no Hanataba", which had been used as the Kyōdōbokin Red Feathers campaign CM song, and also featured as a theme song for the TV show The New Dotch Cooking Show.

One song was a rarity from the soundtrack of the film The Hotel Venus, a cover of the Eagles' song "Desperado".

Other than the new versions of "Remember the Kiss" and "Chōwa Oto", there were three re-recordings: "Arigatō... (The Pearl Edition)", "Yume ga Chikara (Brave Warrior)" and "The Power of Smile (A Gentle Breeze)". Kokia felt it was important for her to re-record "Arigatō...", the lead single from her Pony Canyon debut album Songbird, after her growth as a musician, as well as a thank-you message to all her supporters. She re-recorded "The Power of Smile" (her most successful single) to try a new approach to a song that everyone would recognise. Kokia also attempted to capture the fun feeling of her live performances in the re-recordings of "The Power of Smile" and "Yume ga Chikara" by using musicians she plays with in lives (such as guitarist Kazuhiro Matsuo and pianist Toshiya Shioiri).

== Promotion ==
Kokia appeared on the TV shows West21 and A-ha-n Rouge, as well as had articles in magazines AI-Vision Press, CD Data, Gekkan Audition, Gekkan Newtype and Gekkan Songs throughout January and early February.

On January 21, Kokia performed her first live concert in Paris, titled "Bonjour Paris! Bonjour mon ami!" This was followed by the album's official tour, Kokia Album Tour 'Thank U!', in February 2006 in Japan. She performed at three dates, in Nagoya, Osaka and Tokyo.

== Reception ==
The album reached #19 in its first week, selling 10,000 copies. It charted for a single more week in the top 100 at #67, before charting lowly for another four weeks. The album re-entered the charts in February 2007, charting lowly for two weeks.

== Track listing ==
All songs written by Kokia, except for "Desperado", written by Eagles members Glenn Frey and Don Henley.

No.	Title	Arranger(s)	Length
1.	"The Power of Smile"	Junichi "Igao" Igarashi	4:06
2.	"Ai no Melody (Original Ver.) (愛のメロディー, Melody of Love)"	Taisuke Sawachika	5:38
3.	"Dandelion"	Yūzō Hayashi	4:33
4.	"Shiawase no Hanataba (幸せの花束, Bouquet of Happiness)"	Kokian's	3:56
5.	"Kawaranai Koto (Since 1976) (かわらないこと～ｓｉｎｃｅ１９７６～, Unchanging Thing (Since 1976))"	Sawachika	4:54
6.	"Watashi no Taiyō (私の太陽, My Sun)"	Sawachika	4:54
7.	"Remember the Kiss (A Wish)"	Sawachika	5:44
8.	"Desperado"	Kokia	3:37
9.	"Yume ga Chikara (Brave Warrior) (夢がチカラ／Ｂｒａｖｅ ｗａｒｒｉｏｒ, Dreams Are Strength)"	Kokia	4:35
10.	"Utau Hito (歌う人, Singer)"	Sawachika	4:24
11.	"Time to Say Goodbye"	Ryosuke Nakanishi	4:24
12.	"Chōwa Oto (With Reflection) (調和 ｏｔｏ～ｗｉｔｈ ｒｅｆｌｅｃｔｉｏｎ～, Harmony, Sound (With Reflection))"	Takeshi Senoh	4:35
13.	"So Much Love for You"	Daisuke Kahara	4:57
14.	"I Believe (Umi no Soko Kara) (Ｉ ｂｅｌｉｅｖｅ～海の底から～, I Believe (From the Bottom of the Sea))"	Sawachika	6:05
15.	"Arigatō... (The Pearl Edition) (ありがとう..., Thank You)"	Sawachika	5:07
16.	"The Power of Smile (A Gentle Breeze)"	Toshiya Shioiri	6:19

== Singles ==
Date	Title	Peak position	Weeks	Sales
February 23, 2005	"Dandelion"	84 (Oricon)	3	3,500
July 21, 2005	"Time to Say Goodbye"	54 (Oricon)	2	2,900
January 1, 2006	"Ai no Melody/Chōwa Oto (With Reflection)"	30 (Oricon)	6	13,000
March 16, 2007	"Arigatō... (The Pearl Edition)"	139 (Oricon)	3	1,900

== Japan sales rankings ==
Release	Chart	Peak position	First week sales	Sales total
February 1, 2006	Oricon Weekly Albums Chart	19	10,000	19,000
