= Shinbo =

Shinbo (written: 新房) is a Japanese surname. Notable people with the surname include:

- Akiyuki Shinbo (新房 昭之) (born 1961), Japanese animation director

== See also ==
- Shinbo Nomura (のむら しんぼ) (born 1955), Japanese manga artist
