= Songbird (Kokia album) =

Studio album by Kokia
- Released: July 16, 1999
- Recorded: 1998–1999
- Genre: J-pop
- Length: 48:18; 1:03:01 (re-release)
- Label: Pony Canyon
- Producer: Toshifumi Hinata

Kokia chronology
| Songbird (1999) | Trip Trip (2002) |
| The Voice (2008) | Kokia Complete Collection 1998–1999 (2008) | Fairy Dance: Kokia Meets Ireland (2008) |

Kokia Complete Collection 1998–1999
- Re-release cover.

Singles from Songbird
- 1. "Aishiteiru Kara" Released: April 29, 1998; 2. "Arigatō..." Released: June 17, 1999

Songbird (stylised as songbird) is Kokia's debut album, released on July 16, 1999. It is her only album released under Pony Canyon, the rest being released with Victor Entertainment or Wasabi Records.

The album was re-released in 2008, as Kokia Complete Collection 1998–1999, featuring the album as well bonus tracks from her Pony Canyon singles, "Aishiteiru Kara," "Tears in Love" and "Arigatō..."

Kokia considers the lead single from the album, "Arigatō...," to be one of her favourite songs. She wrote the song in the mid-1990s, about the death of her family's pet dog. She has re-recorded it three times: on her 2006 greatest album, Pearl: The Best Collection, on the 2007 Japanese release of Aigakikoeru: Listen for the Love and on the limited edition of her 2009 second greatest hits album, Coquillage: The Best Collection II.

In 2003, the songs "I Catch a Cold" and "Shiroi Yuki" were used in the soundtrack for the popular Chinese drama At the Dolphin Bay.

== Background ==
Kokia released three singles before her album: "Ai no Field" (愛の輪郭(フィールド), Field of Love), "Tears in Love" and "Arigatō...". "Ai no Field" was the anime Brain Powerd's ending theme song, and was produced by Yoko Kanno (however, it was released through Victor Entertainment and not Pony Canyon). "Tears in Love" was released in November. The B-side from this single, "Blue Night," was played as a theme song for a radio show Kokia had on FM Hokkaido, Kokia Innocent Time. This is the first release Kokia worked on personally, as she wrote the lyrics on both tracks. Seven months later in June 1999, the final single, "Arigatō...," was released.

== Reception ==
Professional ratings
Review scores
| Source | Rating |
|---|---|
| CDJournal | (favourable) |
| Shunta Tanizaki | (favourable) |

The album did not chart on the Japanese Oricon albums charts.

The album was released in Asia (Taiwan, Hong Kong, etc.) in October. In Hong Kong, the album saw much more success. It was released simultaneously with Sammi Cheng's album "Arigatou," which featured a cover of the lead single. Cheng's cover was a hit in Hong Kong. Kokia's version of the song was later awarded third in the 1999 Hong Kong International Popular Song Award (香港國際流行音樂大赏).

Reception by critics was positive. Music critic Shunta Tanizaki praised the album for Kokia's clear voice and described the songs as "kind" and "tearing down the everyday." CDJournal praised the album for its beautiful melodies, and felt that producer Toshifumi Hinata's production fitted well with Kokia's music. Special note was taken of her falsetto vocals, which were described as elegant, impressive and "overflowing with clarity."

== Re-release ==
In 2008, after Kokia had focused working with her new label Victor Entertainment for eight years, Pony Canyon re-released the album for her 10th anniversary. It was retitled Kokia Complete Collection 1998–1999, and featured three tracks not present on the original disc, but on Pony Canyon singles: "Blue Night," "Tears in Love" and the original version of "Aishiteiru Kara." Also featured was a DVD that included the music videos for "Aishiteiru Kara" and "Tears in Love."

The re-release charted at #254 on Oricon's album charts.

== Track listing ==
All songs arranged by Toshifumi Hinata.

| No. | Title | Lyrics | Music | Length |
|---|---|---|---|---|
| 1. | "Watashi wa Utau Kotori Desu (私は歌う小鳥です, I'm a Little Songbird)" | Kokia | Kokia | 2:53 |
| 2. | "Soyokaze ga Sōgen o Naderu Yō ni (そよ風が草原をなでるように, Like a Gentle Breeze Stroking the Grasslands)" | Kokia | Kokia, Toshifumi Hinata | 5:06 |
| 3. | "I Catch a Cold" | Kokia | Kokia | 3:08 |
| 4. | "Shiroi Yuki (白い雪, White Snow)" | Kokia | Kokia | 4:21 |
| 5. | "River" | Kokia | Kokia | 4:21 |
| 6. | "Hirusagari no Toki (昼下がりの時, Early Afternoon)" | Kokia | Kokia | 4:05 |
| 7. | "You" | Hinata | Hinata | 5:05 |
| 8. | "Live Alone" | Kokia | Kokia | 5:52 |
| 9. | "Arigatō... (ありがとう・・・, Thank You...)" | Kokia | Kokia | 4:08 |
| 10. | "Erika (エリカ)" | Kokia | Kokia | 4:04 |
| 11. | "Aishiteiru Kara (Sincerely Version) (愛しているから, Because I Love You)" | Yukiyo Mizuno | Hinata | 4:54 |

Kokia Complete Collection 1998–1999
| No. | Title | Lyrics | Music | Length |
|---|---|---|---|---|
| 1. | "Arigatō..." | Kokia | Kokia | 4:08 |
| 2. | "River" | Kokia | Kokia | 4:21 |
| 3. | "Live Alone" | Kokia | Kokia | 5:52 |
| 4. | "Aishiteiru Kara" | Yukiyo Mizuno | Hinata | 5:08 |
| 5. | "Tears in Love" | Kokia | Hinata | 5:02 |
| 6. | "Watashi wa Utau Kotori Desu" | Kokia | Kokia | 2:53 |
| 7. | "Hirusagari no Toki" | Kokia | Kokia | 4:05 |
| 8. | "Soyokaze ga Sōgen o Naderu Yō ni" | Kokia | Kokia, Hinata | 5:06 |
| 9. | "Blue Night" | Kokia | Hinata | 4:15 |
| 10. | "Shiroi Yuki" | Kokia | Kokia | 4:21 |
| 11. | "Erika" | Kokia | Kokia | 4:04 |
| 12. | "I Catch a Cold" | Kokia | Kokia | 3:08 |
| 13. | "You" | Hinata | Hinata | 5:05 |
| 14. | "Aishiteiru Kara (Sincerely Version)" | Yukiyo Mizuno | Hinata | 4:54 |

== Personnel ==
- Yoshihiro Arita - acoustic guitar ("Arigatō...," "River," "Soyokaze ga Sōgen o Naderu Yō ni")
- Kaoru Arō - artist management, Yui Ongaku Kōbō
- Masaaki Fukushi - art director, 294 inc.
- Toshifumi Hinata - programming, producer, arranger
- Yōichi Honda - Yui Ongaku Kōbō management executive producer
- Miki Horihito - artist management, Yui Ongaku Kōbō
- Yūichirō Iida - disc promoter, Pony Canyon
- Natsuko Kawai - designer, 294 inc.
- Shinichi Kikuchi - recording, mixing (at Studio AVR)
- Kokia - vocal, background vocals, piano ("Watashi wa Utau Kotori Desu")
- Ariaki Kumazawa - sales promoter, Pony Canyon
- Harumi Masuda - hair & make-up, M-Flags
- Yōsuke Miyake - Pony Canyon label executive producer

Kokia – "Arigatō..."
A sample of the chorus of the lead single "Arigatō..." illustrating Toshifumi Hinata's production style.

- Seishū Murakami - acoustic guitar, electric guitar ("Arigatō...," "Live Alone," "River," "Shiroi Yuki," "Soyokaze ga Sōgen o Naderu Yō ni," "You")
- Kazuki Nagano - product management desk, Pony Canyon
- Katsuhito Nakanishi - director, Pony Canyon
- Toshihiro Nakanishi Orchestra with Kuwano Strings - strings arrangement ("You")
- Teruhiko Takenaka - mastering (at Heart best Recording Studio)
- Jin Tamura - photographer
- Ichiko Yasui - stylist, Aim

== Release history ==
| Region | Date | Label | Format | Catalog |
|---|---|---|---|---|
| Japan | July 16, 1999 | Pony Canyon | CD | PCCA-1351 |
| Asia | October 1, 1999 | Pony Canyon (HK) | CD | ACCA-1351 |
| Japan re-release | September 17, 2008 | Pony Canyon | CD+DVD | PCCA-2748 |
