= 90mh =

2019 song by Trefuego

Song by Trefuego
- Released: March 9, 2019
- Genre: Hip hop
- Length: 2:23

"90mh" (stylized in uppercase) is a 2019 song by American rapper Trefuego, featuring an unlicensed sample from the 1986 song "Reflections" by Japanese composer Toshifumi Hinata. Released through the distributor DistroKid, its creator was sued by Sony Music for over $800,000 USD for copyright infringement.

== Background and release ==
A viral hit, 90mh was originally released in September 2019 by independent Arizona-based rapper, Trefuego. Trefuego, whose real name is Dantreal Daevon Clark-Rainbolt released the song when he was 16 years old.

Sony Music Entertainment Inc. took action in January 2021, notifying Trefuego of the "infringing nature" of 90mh. After he allegedly refused to remove the song, the company filed a copyright takedown request on August 9, 2022, to get it pulled from TikTok, YouTube and Spotify.

In December 2022, Sony first sued Trefuego in an Arizona federal court but refiled the case on March 20, 2024 in a federal court in Texas. The music company claimed that "Trefuego... simply stole Hinata’s musical composition and sound recording, using them without asking and without permission, all in flagrant violation of the United States Copyright Laws."

Ultimately garnering over 170 million Spotify streams and its use in at least 155,000 TikTok videos, Sony won $802,997 USD in damages against the rapper.
