= Uta ga Chikara =

Studio album by Kokia
- Released: July 21, 2004 (Japan); September 9, 2005 (Asia)
- Recorded: 2004
- Genres: J-pop, folk
- Length: 42:14
- Label: Victor Entertainment
- Producer: Kokia

Kokia chronology
A Piece of Christmas (2003)	Uta ga Chikara (2004)	Pearl: The Best Collection (2006)

Singles from Uta ga Chikara
- 1. "So Much Love for You" Released: April 21, 2004; 2. "Yume ga Chikara" Released: June 23, 2004

Uta ga Chikara (歌がチカラ, Songs Are Strength) is Kokia's fourth album, released in July 2004, eight months after her last album, "Remember Me." The album centres on inspirational songs, including the official song for the Japan team at the 2004 Summer Olympics, "Yume ga Chikara."

The song "Utau Hito" was later used as the ending theme song for the animated film Furusato: Japan in 2007. Director Akio Nishizawa felt the song was so fitting for his film, it was as if the song were commissioned specifically for it. The song featured on Kokia's first greatest hits album, Pearl: The Best Collection, as well as the B-side of her 2007 single "Arigatō... (The Pearl Edition)."

== Background ==
The album was preceded by two singles: "So Much Love for You" in April and "Yume ga Chikara" in June. "So Much Love for You" was used as the sole theme song for the variety show U! Umai n Desu., while one of the B-sides on the single "New Season (Yume ni Mukatte Fuku Kaze)" was used in a commercial for the Japan Vocational School Information Research (全国専門学校広報研究会). However, most of the promotional focus went to "Yume ga Chikara." The song was used as the official cheering song for the Japan team at the 2004 Summer Olympics.

== Reception ==
Professional ratings
Review scores
Source	Rating
CDJournal	(recommended)
Tomoyuki Mori	(favourable)

The album reached #23 on the Japanese Oricon albums charts, selling 20,000 copies. It is Kokia's second most sold album (behind "Remember Me"), as of 2010.

The album received mostly positive reviews from critics. Tomoyuki Mori praised Kokia for her "pure and beautiful vocal quality," and was positive on the inspirational themes on the album. CDJournal gave the album a star of recommendation. They especially praised "Utau Hito," saying that "(Kokia's) fervent singing from the bottom of her heart" made the reviewer fall in love with the song. Also praised were Kokia's motivational songs "Pinch wa Chance" and "New Season (Yume ni Mukatte Fuku Kaze)," along with the acoustic version of "Yume ga Chikara."

== Track listing ==
All songs written and produced by Kokia.

No.	Title	Arranger(s)	Length
1.	"Yume ga Chikara (夢がチカラ, Dreams Are Strength)"	Akira Senju	4:13
2.	"A Girl"	Ryōsuke Nakanishi	3:48
3.	"So Much Love for You"	Daisuke Kahara	4:59
4.	"Sora ni Taiyō, Anata ni Watashi (空に太陽 あなたに私, The Sky and the Sun, You and Me)"	Kahara	4:17
5.	"Pinch wa Chance (ピンチはチャンス, A Crisis Is an Opportunity)"	Kahara	3:48
6.	"Kirari (キラリ, Flashing)"	Nakanishi	4:25
7.	"Give & Take"	Kahara	4:44
8.	"New Season (Yume ni Mukatte Fuku Kaze) (Ｎｅｗ ｓｅａｓｏｎ～夢に向かって吹く風～, New Season (Wind Blowing Towards Dreams))"	Kokian's	3:26
9.	"Utau Hito (歌う人, Singer)"	Taisuke Sawachika	4:27
10.	"Yume ga Chikara (Acoustic Version) (夢がチカラ, Dreams Are Strength)"	Senju	4:07

== Singles ==
Date	Title	Peak position	Weeks	Sales
April 21, 2004	"So Much Love for You"	40 (Oricon)	5	6,692
June 23, 2004	"Yume ga Chikara"	30 (Oricon)	5	8,258

== Japan Sales Rankings ==
Release	Chart	Peak position	First week sales	Sales total	Chart run
July 21, 2004	Oricon Daily Albums Chart				
July 21, 2004	Oricon Weekly Albums Chart	23	8,172	19,917	7 weeks
July 21, 2004	Oricon Yearly Albums Chart				

== Personnel ==
- Kiyotsugu Amano - acoustic guitar (#1)
- Katsuhiko Asano - recording/mixing
- Masashi Fujimori - art direction, art work (Chocolate)
- Sayaka Hayakawa - violin (#4)
- Ayako Himata - violin (#2)
- Shigeyuki Hirano - director, tambourine (#6, #8) (Mother Land)
- Junichi "Igao" Igarashi - programming (#8)
- Noriko Inose - photography
- Daisuke Kahara - arranger, programming (#3–5, #7)
- Tetsuto Kato - recording/mixing (Envers)
- Hiroshi Kawasaki - mastering (at Flair)
- Yukie Kazama - management (Mother Land)
- Shoji Kobayashi - score copyist (#1, #10)
- Kokia - arranger (#8), chorus work, song writing, vocals
- Daisuke Kurihara - visuals (Chocolate)
- Akiko Maeda - management (Mother Land)
- Kazuhiro Matsuo - guitars (#3–5, #7–8)
- Fumiaki Miyamoto - oboe (#1, #10)
- Kazuhiko Miyamoto - recording/mixing (#4–5, #7)
- Hajime Mizoguchi - cello (#1, #10)
- Ryōsuke Nakanishi - arranger (#2, #6)
- Akio Namiki - hair, make-up (Kurara System)
- Naruki Niino - management (Mother Land)
- Hiroo Oda - executive producer (Mother Land)

"Yume ga Chikara"
The lead single from the album, featuring Akira Senju's orchestral pop sound for the Olympics.

"Utau Hito"
The piano ballad about Kokia's will to sing was highlighted by CDJournal and director Akio Nishizawa.

- Yuzo Oka - bass (#5)
- Masayoshi Ookawa - recording/mixing (#1, #10)
- Taisuke Sawachika - arranger, piano, programming (#9)
- Akira Senju - arranger, conductor, keyboards (#1, #10)
- Genpachi Sekiguchi (#6)
- Takeshi Sennoo - piano (#1, #10)
- Nobuhisa Shimizu - executive producer (Victor)
- Setsuko Sugita - strings (gallery music/leader) (#1, #10)
- Yoshimi Sugiura - coordinator (#3–5, #7)
- Yoji Sugiyama - coordinator (Witch Craft) (#1, #10)
- Eiko Suzuki - visual coordinator (V.D.C.)
- Yurika Suzuki - stylist (Dynamic)
- Yoshinari Takegami - saxophone (#5)
- Toshino Tanabe - bass (#6)
- Hiroshi Tanaka - artist promoter (Victor)
- Hiroko Uno - visuals (Chocolate)
- Takefumi Wada - manipulator (#1)
- China Yoshihiko (#2, #6)
- Haruyuki Yukawa - A&R (Victor)
