= Yume ga Chikara =

Single by Kokia

from the album Uta ga Chikara
- Released: June 23, 2004
- Genre: J-pop
- Length: 4:11
- Label: Victor Entertainment
- Songwriter: Kokia
- Producer: Akira Senju

Kokia singles chronology
"So Much Love for You" (2004)	"Yume ga Chikara" (2004)	"Dandelion" (2005)

"Yume ga Chikara" (夢がチカラ, Dreams Are Strength) is Kokia's 12th single, released on June 23, 2004. It was the lead single from Kokia's fourth studio album Uta ga Chikara, and was used as the official cheering song for the Japan team at the 2004 Summer Olympics.

== Background ==
"Yume ga Chikara" was one of two singles released after Kokia's commercially successful third album, Remember Me. During this stage of her career, Kokia had releases that generally charted in the low end of the top 40.

This song was the second official encouragement song picked by the Japanese Olympic Committee, after "Sui Riku Sora Mugendai" by Japanese band 19 was used for the 2000 Summer Olympics.

== Promotion ==
Kokia's involvement with the games was first announced in a press conference on March 3, 2004, along with Akira Senju's involvement as the sound producer. The song took two months for completion, and was officially announced and first performed at a press conference on May 11. The song was often performed or played at official Japanese Olympic events, such as the end of the torch relay, the Japanese Olympic Concert 2004 held on June 20, the unveiling of the official Olympic poster competition, and the farewell party for the Japanese delegation. Both "Yume ga Chikara" and Kokia's studio album Uta ga Chikara were released earlier than the Olympics, with the album being released less than a month earlier, and the single almost two months. Kokia visited the Olympic village during the games, encouraging athletes such as female wrestler Kyoko Hamaguchi, singing the song a cappella and creating a hi no maru flag of encouragement.

Along with official Olympic promotion, Kokia was featured in many music-related and fashion-related magazines in June 2004, such as "CD Data," "Gekkan Piano," "Gekkan Songs," "Weekly Oricon," "What's In?" and "Zappy." "Yume ga Chikara" ringtones were released free of charge to Japanese Vodafone customers between July 1 and September 30. The music video for the song was available for streaming on the Yahoo! Japan top page until August the 30th.

== Composition ==
"Yume ga Chikara"
The standard Akira Senju-arranged version of the song.

"Yume ga Chikara (Acoustic Version)"
The acoustic Senju-arranged version, featured as a bonus track on Uta ga Chikara.

"Yume ga Chikara / Brave Warrior"
The guitar acoustic version arranged by Kokia, featured on Pearl: The Best Collection.

"Yume ga Chikara" is a pop song, with an orchestral and standard band backing, with extended instrumental sections. The song's vocal sections have a structure of two verses and a chorus, repeated twice, followed by a final extended and elaborated chorus. The song's lyrics begin by telling people that dreams have to be built up from somewhere. The first chorus makes the statement that "everyone can dream freely," and that "dreams come true, not by magic, but through your own strength." Further lyrics expand on this theme, also telling people to "not forget that they aren't alone."

Kokia wrote the song "not as just a song to encourage [the Japanese Olympic] athletes, but a song to empower everybody with bravery in the same way that athletes use all of their effort."

== Re-recordings ==
The song has been re-recorded by Kokia two times in her discography. "Yume ga Chikara (Acoustic Version)," a rearrangement by Akira Senju (the arranger for the original) was featured as a bonus track on Kokia's 2004 album Uta ga Chikara. Instead of the standard band arrangement, the acoustic version was backed by a string orchestra and piano. "Yume ga Chikara / Brave Warrior," is a version of the song that appears on Kokia's 2006 greatest hits album Pearl: The Best Collection, and features a guitar-based arrangement created by Kokia herself. This version features a new introduction section, with the lyrics "Brave warrior, habatake" (Brave warrior羽ばたけ, brave warrior, fly your wings).

== Music video ==
The music video was directed by Jun Hara (原淳). It centres around two different scenes, Kokia performing the song in a massive wooden indoor stadium with an orchestra surrounding her, and also scenes of Kokia performing the song against the single cover art as a background.

== Reception ==
Commercially, the song debuted at #30 in its first week, selling over 4,500 copies. It spent one further week in the top 100, and three further weeks placing between 100 and 200. By the end of its chart run, the single had sold 8,300 copies. Compared with other Kokia singles, "Yume ga Chikara" was relatively one of her more commercially successful releases.

Critically, CDJournal praised the song for its ability to quietly push people forward with its "gentle melody and Kokia's phosphorescent singing voice." Music critic Kenji Ueda believed the song was "appropriately grand" for use as the Olympic team encouragement song. He described the song as "truly refreshing," praising the string section that he felt was like "[water] streaming past," Kokia's voice as being "without even a spot of haze" and the song's melody as "overflowing with liveliness."

== Track listing ==
No.	Title	Writer(s)	Arranger(s)	Length
1.	"Yume ga Chikara"	Kokia	Akira Senju	4:11
2.	"Ningyo no Yume (人魚の夢, A Mermaid's Dream)"	Kokia	Senju	4:05
3.	"Yume ga Chikara (Instrumental Version)"	Kokia	Senju	4:11
Total length:				12:33

== Japan Sales Rankings ==
Release	Chart	Peak position	First week sales	Sales total	Chart run
June 23, 2004	Oricon daily singles chart				
June 23, 2004	Oricon weekly singles chart	30	4,500	8,300	5 weeks
June 23, 2004	Oricon yearly singles chart				

== Personnel ==
- Kiyotsugu Amano - acoustic guitar
- Shoji Kobayashi - score copyist
- Kokia - arranger (Brave Warrior), chorus work, song writing, vocals
- Fumiaki Miyamoto - oboe (standard and acoustic)
- Hajime Mizoguchi - cello (standard and acoustic)
- Masayoshi Ookawa - recording/mixing (standard and acoustic)
- Akira Senju - arranger, conductor, keyboards (standard and acoustic)
- Takeshi Sennoo - piano (standard and acoustic)
- Setsuko Sugita - strings (gallery music/leader) (standard and acoustic)
- Yoji Sugiyama - coordinator (Witch Craft) (standard and acoustic)
- Takefumi Wada - manipulator
