= Trip Trip =

Studio album by Kokia
- Released: January 9, 2002 (Asia); January 23, 2002 (Japan)
- Recorded: 2001
- Genres: J-pop, folk
- Length: 1:03:37
- Label: Victor Entertainment
- Producer: Kokia

Kokia chronology
Songbird (1999)	Trip Trip (2002)	Remember Me (2003)

Singles from Trip Trip
- 1. "Tomoni" Released: May 23, 2001; 2. "Say Hi!!" Released: August 22, 2001; 3. "Tenshi" Released: November 21, 2001; 4. "Ningen tte Sonna Mono ne" Released: January 23, 2002

Trip Trip (stylised as trip trip) is Kokia's second album, released in January 2002. It was her first album released with Victor Entertainment, and her only released under Gai Records management (though Kokia worked with both companies for her collaborations with Ryuichi Kawamura on his ЯKS album, Kanata Made, in 2000). Unlike Songbird, the album was self-produced.

The opening track, "Chōwa Oto", was later re-arranged and used as the opening theme song for the animated film Origin: Spirits of the Past in 2006. It was released as the second A-side on the single "Ai no Melody/Chōwa Oto (With Reflection)" (愛のメロディー／調和 ｏｔｏ～ｗｉｔｈ ｒｅｆｌｅｃｔｉｏｎ～, Melody of Love/Harmony, Sound (With Reflection)), and also features on her greatest hits album Pearl: The Best Collection in this re-arranged version. No other songs from the album featured due to licensing issues with Gai Records.

"A Gift" was used in European commercials for Subaru in 2002.

== Background ==
Four singles were released from the album: "Tomoni", "Say Hi!!", and "Tenshi" in 2001, and "Ningen tte Sonna Mono ne" in 2002 (simultaneously released with the album in Japan). None of these singles charted in Japan.

After Kokia's initial recognition in Hong Kong, some of these singles were released in the Chinese speaking world. "Say Hi!!" was released as a special five track release (featuring "Tomoni", its B-side, "Yes I Know" and an instrumental track as added songs), while "Tenshi" was released in a standard form. Both of the overseas releases were delayed after their initial Japanese release (Say Hi!! by three weeks, Tenshi by two). Kokia also performed at two high-profile concerts to coincide with these releases: the 13th anti-drug concert in Hong Kong on November the 17th to 30,000 people, and the annual Taiwanese New Year's concert to 120,000.

The singles were given several tie-ups. "Tomoni" was used as an ending theme song for two Nippon Television shows: Shin-D Quintet (Shin-D クインテット) and Nitteru (ニッテる). "Say Hi!!" was used for Shiseido commercials in Asia, outside Japan. "Tenshi" was used as the ending theme song for the NHK show Shin Mayonaka no Ōkoku (新・真夜中の王国).

== Reception ==
Professional ratings
Review scores
Source	Rating
CDJournal	(favourable)
JaME World	(favourable)
MTV Taiwan	4/5 stars
Hiroshi Suzuki	(favourable)

The album did not chart on the Japanese Oricon albums charts.

Reception by critics was positive. CDJournal praised Kokia for her song-writing skills and vocal variations. Music critic Hiroshi Suzuki believed the strength of the album came from the self-conscious nature of Kokia's songwriting, comparing her sound to early Kate Bush.

JaME World noted a Middle Eastern sound in the music, as well as the variety of instruments and genres used. Both JAME World and MTV Taiwan found the album to be showing an apparently more honest and sincere side to herself, in comparison to her debut album Songbird.

MTV Taiwan found her lyrics to be poetic, and praised the aspects of nature and humanity expressed in her music. They also believed the comparison of Kokia as the Japanese Enya and successor to Miyuki Nakajima to be wrong, instead citing that "KOKIA is KOKIA", describing her voice as less ethereal and more energetic and humane.

== Track listing ==
All songs written and produced by Kokia. The mainland Chinese bonus track, "Current", was used in Suntory Oolong tea commercials in Shanghai.

No.	Title	Arranger(s)	Length
1.	"Chōwa (調和, Harmony)"	Ryuta Yoshimura	4:31
2.	"Tsugi Au Toki wa (次会う時は, The Next Time We Meet)"	Taisuke Sawachika	4:42
3.	"Say Hi!!"	Sawachika	5:13
4.	"The Rule of the Universe"	Sawachika	4:40
5.	"Princess Éhime"	Kokia	4:58
6.	"Tenshi (天使, Angel)"	Sawachika	5:12
7.	"Pink no Zō (ぴんくの象, Pink Elephant)"	Kokia	4:23
8.	"Hello Passing Days"	Sawachika	5:00
9.	"Hana (花, Flower)"	Sawachika	5:32
10.	"Ningen tte Sonna Mono ne (人間ってそんなものね, People Are Just Like That)"	Susumu Nishikawa	5:04
11.	"Ashioto (足音, Footstep Sounds)"	Yoshimura	4:20
12.	"Tomoni (Together)"	Yoshimura	5:16
13.	"A Gift"	Yoshimura	4:46

Mainland Chinese bonus tracks
No.	Title	Length
14.	"Kokia Comment (本人旁白)"
15.	"Current (风潮 [CURRENT])"	4:24

== Personnel ==
- Kaoru Abe – drums (#11)
- Akino – hair, make-up
- Naoya Emi – bass (#6, #8)
- Nobuo Eguchi – drums (#3)
- Miho Fukujoji – visual coordination
- Masayoshi Furukawa – guitars (#12)
- Keiichi Hayakawa – promotion (Gai Records)
- Miki Horihiro – artist management (RKM Family)
- Toshiaki Kanoh – guitar (#2, #4)
- Kokia – arranger (#5, #7), booklet illustrator, chorus arranger, songwriter, piano (#7), producer, vocals
- Yasumasa Kubota – executive producer (Victor Entertainment)
- Yasuomi Kurita – styling
- Mecken – bass (#3)
- Chiharu Mikuzuki – bass (#11)
- Masafumi Minato – drums (#6)
- Mataro Misawa – percussion (#7, #12)
- Shigeo Miyamoto – mastering (at Flair)
- Masayumi Muraishi – drums (#2, #4)
- Masayuki Nakahara – recording/mixing (#5, #9–11, #13)
- Shuji Nakamura – guitars (#1, #11)
- Nobuhiko Nakayama – programming (#10)
- Susumu Nishikawa – arranger (#10), bass (#10), guitar (#3, #6, #10)

"Chōwa Oto"
Kokia's first instance of her complex neoclassical (dark wave) music and wordplay.

"Ningen tte Sonna Mono ne"
The leading single from the album, featuring more of a rock sound than the bulk of the album.

- Takashi Nishiumi – guitar (#2, #8)
- Takashi Noguchi – photography
- Teruo Saegusa – supervisor (Victor Entertainment)
- Taisuke Sawachika – arranger/programming (#2–4, #6, #8–9), percussion (#4), pianica (#2), piano (#6, #8),
- Yasuaki "V" Shindo – recording/mixing (#1–4, #6–8, #12)
- Keiji Sugimoto – executive producer (Gai Records)
- Jun Sumida – guitar (#3)
- Shunji Suzurikawa – sales promotion (Victor Entertainment)
- Masayoshi Tanaka – executive producer (R K M Family)
- Akio Ueki Quartette – strings (#13)
- Hitoshi Watanabe – bass (#2, #4)
- Naoki Watanabe – bass (#12)
- Yoshitaka Watanabe – A&R
- Takuya Yamada – art direction, design
- Tetsuya Yamada – sales promotion (Victor Entertainment)
- Ryuta Yoshimura – arranger (#1, #11–13), piano (#13) programming (#1, #5, #11–13)
