= Tsurupika Hagemaru =

Japanese manga series

つるピカハゲ丸
- Genre: Comedy
- Manga
- Written by: Shinbo Nomura
- Published by: Shogakukan
- Magazine: CoroCoro Comic
- Original run: 1985 – 1995
- Volumes: 25
- Anime television series

Tsurupika Hagemaru-kun
- Directed by: Tetsuo Yasumi
- Produced by: Junichi Kimura (TV Asahi); Sōjirō Masuko (Shin-Ei Animation)
- Written by: Masaaki Sakurai
- Music by: Kuni Kawachi
- Studio: Shin-Ei Animation
- Original network: ANN (TV Asahi)
- Original run: March 3, 1988 – October 6, 1989
- Episodes: 59 + 3 specials
- Video game

Tsurupika Hagemaru-kun Mezase! Tsuru Seko no Shou
- Publisher: Jaleco
- Genre: Action
- Platform: Family Computer
- Released: December 13, 1991

Tsurupika Hagemaru (つるピカハゲ丸; lit. 'Little Baldy Hagemaru'), or simply Hagemaru, is a Japanese manga series written and illustrated by Shinbo Nomura. The series was published in the Shogakukan magazine CoroCoro Comic from 1985 to 1995. It tells the story of a young boy named Hagemaru and his ideas for saving money.

An anime television series produced by Shin-Ei Animation titled Tsurupika Hagemaru-kun (つるピカハゲ丸くん), aired on TV Asahi and its affiliates from March 1988 to October 1989.

== Premise ==
The light-hearted story revolves around a young boy named Hagemaru with notably thick eyebrows and an unashamed positive and upbeat attitude. It spreads focus on his greedy family and the slice of life adventures he has with his schoolmates, typically his best friend and teacher who are irked by Hagemaru's schemes and disruptive demeanor.

== Cast ==
- Noriko Tsukase as Hagemaru (episodes 1 – 37)
- Kazuko Sugiyama as Hagemaru (episodes 38 – 52)
- Jun'ichi Kanemaru as Masaru Kondou, Bonshi
- Naoki Makishima as Pesu
- Ginzô Matsuo as Homework Mask
- Mariko Mukai as Aiko Hageda
- Riyako Nagao as Kurumi, Nikori Yamada, Midori
- Ken'ichi Ogata as Yuji Hageda
- Tomoko Ohtsuka as Mrs. Kondou
- Yoshino Takamori as Sakiki Sakura
- Shigeru Chiba as Tonarita
- Ako Mayama as Busu

== Media ==
=== Anime ===
Due to the popularity of the manga in Japan, an anime adaptation was produced by Shin-Ei Animation in 1988. It was directed by Hiroshi Sasagawa and was broadcast by TV Asahi from March 3, 1988, to October 6, 1989. The 58 episode anime series also became a big hit, and, because of its popularity, a game was also created for the Family Computer. Since then, Tsurupika Hagemaru has been aired all around the world.

In India, it was titled Hagemaru by Pogo and was dubbed into Hindi, Tamil and Telugu. The show later aired on Hungama TV with a different Hindi dub.

In Malaysia, it is aired by Astro Ceria. The official English title is Hagemaru the Bald One.

A 3D cartoon, intended as a soft reboot, was slated for 2021 but production status and release are still unknown as of 2026.

=== Video game ===
A Tsurupika Hagemaru video game titled Tsurupika Hagemaru: Mezase! Tsuru Seko no Akashi (つるピカハゲ丸 〜めざせ！つるセコの証〜) was released for the Nintendo Famicom by Jaleco on December 13, 1991.

== Accolades ==
Tsurupika Hagemaru received the Shogakukan Manga Award for children's manga in 1987.
