= Nishihara (surname) =

Nishihara (written: 西原) is a Japanese surname. Notable people with the surname include:

- Clarence K. Nishihara, American politician
- Giichi Nishihara (西原 儀一, born 1929), Japanese film director, screenwriter, producer and actor
- Hiroshi Nishihara (西原 寛, born 1955), Japanese chemist
- Kasumi Nishihara (西原 加純, born 1989), Japanese long-distance runner
- Kumiko Nishihara (西原 久美子, born 1965), Japanese voice actress
- Takashi Nishihara (西原 誉志, born 1986), Japanese footballer
