= List of Saiyuki characters =

The protagonists of the Saiyuki series, (from left to right) Sha Gojyo, Cho Hakkai, Genjo Sanzo and Son Goku.

This is a list of characters of the manga and anime series Saiyuki.

== Main characters ==
=== Sanzo ===
Genjo Sanzo (玄奘三蔵) One of the main characters and a priest, He is the 31st of China. He is one of the only five supreme monks in Taoyuan Township, and is the owner of the Tenchi Kaigen Kyobun "Maten". He has no intention of devoting himself to Buddhism, and he is a priest who enjoys drinking, smoking and gambling. While he has a keen eye and charisma to discern things, his attitude is always arrogant and violent. His habit is "die" and "kill". He is the one who brought the group together to travel to the west under the command from the Sanbutsushin and from Kanzeon Botatsu, the Goddess of Mercy. He is also the one who released Goku from his 500-year prison and now looks after him like a father. He carries the Maten scripture that some are after but uses his gun (a silver banishing gun in the anime and an ordinary snub-nosed revolver in the manga) as his main weapon. Some demons come after him because they believe that eating a priest would make them immortal, but that was soon proved wrong. Ill-tempered and cynical, Sanzo is frequently smacking Goku on the head with his fan whenever he does or says something annoying and constantly shoots at both him and Gojyo whenever they start arguing. Despite the fact that he refuses to openly acknowledge the other members of his group as friends, Sanzo deeply cares for his teammates and will do whatever it takes to protect them. Sanzo's real name is Koryu, which he was named by the senior monks of the temple he was raised at as a way to make fun of him. The only people who Sanzo openly recognized and respected were his predecessor and mentor: Koumyou Sanzo, who was killed by demons one night after bestowing the young Koryu the title of Sanzo, and Rikudo, formerly named Shuei, the clerk abbot who was the only other survivor of the attack, and whom Sanzo was later forced to kill out of mercy after using a curse known as "Araya". Sanzo is voiced by Toshihiko Seki in Japanese, with the exception in the original OVA in which he is voiced by Wataru Takagi. In the English dub, he is voiced by David Matranga in the original series, Saiyuki: Requiem, Saiyuki Reload Blast and ZEROIN, while in Reload Gunlock he is voiced by Lex Lang. As a child, Sanzo is voiced by Yuko Kobayashi in Japanese of the original series and by Kahoru Sasajima in Reload. In the English dub he is voiced by Kevin Corn in the first two seasons, by Mona Marshall at the start of Reload Gunlock and by Mela Lee in the later episodes of Reload.

=== Goku ===
Son Goku (孫悟空) A heretical existence that is neither a human being nor a youkai nor a god, born from a rock on the summit of Mt. He had committed some mortal sin in the past and was trapped in a rock prison for 500 years, but was rescued by Sanzo. The official name is "Saitendai Holy Son Goku". He controls the magical power with the gold of his forehead. He has a bright, pure and straightforward personality. He has a bottomless stomach and his habit is "hungry" He is the cheerful "Monkey King" who uses a staff, known as the Nyoi-Bo, as his primary weapon. There is no explanation given in the anime as to the origin of Goku's weapon; in the manga, it is revealed that the Nyoi-bo was sealed in a canister in the temple, which he and Gojyo shattered whilst goofing off. He is the Seiten Taisei, the Great Sage Equaling Heaven, and whose true self and powers are released when his diadem is removed. As the Seiten Taisei he is very destructive and cruel, and nearly invincible. He's even able to take in the Earth's energy and regenerate because he was spawned from the sheer energy of the earth itself. During Saiyuki Gaiden, Goku was made a ward of Konzen and befriends both Tenpou and Kenren. When his diadem was removed, Goku killed many celestial beings in his craze. Konzen, Tenpou, and Kenren work to protect Goku, but all four became banished from Heaven. Goku was locked in cage high in the mountains and lost his memories. Goku is found by Sanzo and freed from his imprisonment, and Sanzo becomes something like a foster father to Goku. Goku accompanies Sanzo on his mission to track down Hakkai, and helps to prevent Hakkai from killing himself, and Hakkai later becomes his teacher. Goku joins Sanzo, Hakkai, and Gojyo to stop the resurrection of Gyumaoh, during which he discovered that he was Seiten Taisei, having previously been aware of it. Goku is voiced by Sōichirō Hoshi in Japanese, with the exception of when he was voiced by Kōsuke Okano in the first OVA series. He is voiced in English by Greg Ayres in the original series, Requiem, Blast, and ZEROIN, while Yuri Lowenthal voiced him in Reload and Gunlock.

=== Gojyo ===
Sha Gojyo (沙悟浄, Sha Gojō) He is a half born between a youkai and a human, which is contraindicated in Togenkyo. He likes picking up girls and has a bad habit. However, despite his appearance, he is a caring and friendly person, so it is easy to draw a poor lottery. A childish quarrel with Goku is a daily occurrence, and each time he is called a strange nickname, "Erotic Kappa" or "Cockroach Kappa". As a child, he was perpetually being either ignored or beaten by his stepmother, who had been devastated to learn that her husband had an affair with a human woman. In the manga, Gojyo's father and his human mother commit suicide; there is no explanation of their deaths given in the anime. After the deaths of his father and mother Gojyo was given to his father's youkai wife. He was very close to his older brother, Jien, who constantly pacified his mother whenever she became violent toward Gojyo (in the manga, it is revealed that Mama Sha and Jien begin a sexual relationship at this time, but this is never expressly stated in the anime), especially whenever he tried to cheer her up as she was in a permanent state of depression over her husband's infidelity and death. Eventually, their mother goes insane and attempts to kill Gojyo (using her bare hands in the anime and an ax in the manga). Jien kills his mother to save Gojyo's life, but not before she carves two deep scratches into the side of Gojyo's face. Torn with shame and guilt over the tragedy, Jien abandons Gojyo, and the brothers only meet again years later on opposite sides of their current conflict. Gojyo smokes, gambles, and flirts with nearly every woman he meets (the last trait is implied to be mainly due to the trauma of being unloved by his abusive stepmother, despite his constant efforts at winning her affection). He and Goku are also prone to fighting, like brothers will, and are often scolded by Sanzo as a result. Gojyo is quick to defend others and holds particular sympathy towards threatened children. Gojyo is voiced by Hiroaki Hirata in Japanese, with the exception of the first OVA series, in which he was voiced by Kōichi Yamadera. He is voiced by Illich Guardiola in English for the original series and Requiem, by Tony Oliver for Reload and Gunlock and by Ian Sinclair in Blast and ZEROIN. The child Gojyo in the Japanese version is voiced by Kayu Suzuki in the first series and by Masayo Hosono in Reload and in the English version he is voiced by Sam Foster in the original series and by Julie Ann Taylor in Reload.

=== Hakkai ===
Cho Hakkai (豬八戒) He is a former human youkai who killed a thousand youkai for revenge and became a youkai when he was exposed to the blood. He basically hates conflict and has a calm and friendly personality. On the other hand, he is very scary when he gets angry and is feared by the other three as a back-door. he is the mild, polite and level-headed member of the group who always looks out for their day to day well-being. Hakkai rarely displays anger, but when he does even Gojyo and Goku are afraid of him. He also is able to manipulate chi, allowing him to heal others (depending on how wounded they are), and create blasts of chi and make protective barriers. Hakkai also owns a pet dragon, named Hakuryuu (or Jeep). Formerly, Cho Hakkai had been known as Cho Gonou and worked as a school teacher. He was romantically involved with his elder sister, Kanan (not Kanaan), though they hadn't originally known this as they had grown up in separate orphanages (this is revealed in the manga, but is never made clear in the anime). Kanan was later raped by a youkai noble, Hyakugen Maoh, while Gonou was away at work, and despite being rescued, she committed suicide, not wanting to bear the child. Originally human, Hakkai had changed into a youkai after massacring 1000 youkai, consisting of his neighbouring villagers (his killing of the villagers was not depicted or mentioned in the anime), a tribe of crow demons who were blackmailed into sacrificing Kanan in order to save themselves, as well as Hyakugen Maoh himself and the rest of his clan/household. Hakkai is found by Gojyo near-death, and is later tracked down by Sanzo and Goku. He tries to run away, but is confronted by the last surviving member of the crow tribe he massacred who tells Hakkai he ripped out the eyes of his dead brother. To atone, Hakkai proceeds to rip out his own right eye. He is about to tear out his left eye as well but is stopped by Goku. Hakkai then kills the demon, stating that he wants to keep living. In penance for his crime, Cho Gonou was metaphorically killed and reborn as Cho Hakkai. To control his youkai powers, Hakkai wears a set of 3 power limiters, in the form of ear cuffs on his left ear, and he rarely removes them, only doing so when absolutely necessary. As a youkai, although much stronger, he becomes susceptible to the minus waves. Hakkai is voiced by Akira Ishida in Japanese. In English, he is voiced by Braden Hunt for the original series and Requiem, Steve Cannon for Reload and Gunlock, Micah Solusod in Blast, and by Howard Wang in ZEROIN. As a child Hakkai is voiced by Saori Higashi in the Japanese version and by Nyl Stewart in the English dub.

== Antagonists ==
=== Gyumaoh ===
Gyumaoh (牛魔王): The great Youkai buried by the war god, Crown Prince Nataku, five hundred years ago at Houtou Castle in India. Gyumaoh remains in stasis, while a plot to revive him develops apace. It's this plot that is responsible for unleashing the Minus Wave that corrupted the Youkai.

=== Ni Jianyi ===
Dr. Ni Jianyi (你 健一): The only human being enrolled in Boto Castle. As a scientist named Kenichi Kyo, he is involved in experiments to revive the Ox Demon King, but his true identity is one of the highest priests, Ukoku Sanzo. He possesses the Tenchi Kaigen Sutra, Muten. His words and deeds do not show his true feelings, and there are many unknown parts.

A wild card, mystery man, mad scientist, and Koushou's human lover. He owns a plush rabbit that he carries with him as his pet. He was also once a Sanzo priest (known as Ukoku Sanzo; he was the youngest to attain the rank before Genjo Sanzo, who is around the same age as him) and was considered a heretic because he fought and killed his master (Goudai Sanzo) to attain his title instead of inheriting his chakra from the gods along with the Muten sutra (Which is later revealed to be hidden within the stuffed rabbit). During his time before becoming a priest he easily mastered all material arts and spiritual powers, growing strong enough that he could literally kill others with a wave of his arm. His pupil, a man whose name is never revealed and is known simply as "God" (Kami-sama), appears in Reload anime, as someone that Ni gave all the power he gained to since he no longer had any use for it, though at some points Ni is hinted to retain his power. Although he's extremely eccentric, he's also intelligent and ruthless. His reasons for aiding in reviving Gyumaoh are a mystery. Mysteriously, he knows of Sanzo's origins. He was also called Ken'yuu before attaining the title of Sanzo. In the original Japanese version, he is voiced by Hōchū Ōtsuka. In the English versions, he was voiced by Tommy Drake in the original series, Kirk Thornton in Reload and Gunlock, and by Justin Doran in ZEROIN.

=== Kougaiji ===
Kougaiji (紅孩児): The son of Gyumaoh and Rasetsunyo (an evil female demon), Kougaiji inspires great loyalty in those who serve him. As for Kougaiji's loyalties, they lie with his parents ... his real parents, and while Gyokumen would like Kougaiji to view her as his mother, she isn't, and Kougaiji is not about to forget that. He deeply cares for other yōkai, but has never displayed any ill feelings toward humans. Despite that he's willing to let countless humans and yōkai die if it means bringing his mother back. A notable aspect that's added in the anime is that Kougaiji's sense of pride is greatly exaggerated at points. He often passes up chances where he could easily defeat the Sanzo part when they've been weakened in some way, desiring to defeat them when they're at full strength, and once attempted to singlehandly fight Goku when his power limiter was removed, despite nearly dying when he last fought him in that state. Of everyone he's been around, he's been shown to care for Lirin the most and often attempts to keep her out of battles. He wields power over fire and the ability to summon powerful fiends. He's also a highly skilled hand-to-hand fighter. He generally serves as Goku's opponent. In the Japanese version he is voiced by Takeshi Kusao, with the exception of the first OVA series, in which he was voiced by Yuuki Matsuda. In the English version, he is voiced by Vic Mignogna in the original series and Blast. In Reload and Gunlock, he is voiced by Terrence Stone. In ZEROIN, he is voiced by Alejandro Saab.

=== Lirin ===
Lirin (李厘): Kougaiji's half-sister and Gyokumen Koushou's daughter. She deeply admires Kougaiji, and overall is like a female Son Goku in personality, though she's far more naive than even him. Although she likes fighting, she's also extremely friendly. Lirin is highly skilled hand-to-hand fighter, but she isn't very smart and as running gag Sanzo "defeats" her just by tossing her a meat bun which she focuses on instead of fighting. Kougaiji is also used to this tactic, diverting her from her assistance by promising to bring her back food from his trip. When Kougaiji's group fights Sanzo's group, she's usually seen on Sanzo's shoulders. Sanzo views her as another monkey, like Son Goku. In the Japanese versions, she is portrayed by Kaoru Morota in the original series and by Tomoko Kawakami in Reload and Gunlock. In the English versions, she is voiced by Hilary Haag in the original series, by M.A. Lovestedt in Reload and by Cindy Robinson in Gunlock.

=== Dokugakuji ===
Dokugakuji (独角兕): : Gojyo's full-yōkai half-brother, formerly known as Sha Jien. When he was younger he was very close to his little brother, and attempted to protect him from his violently unstable mother by having an incestuous affair with her. She attempted to kill Gojyo anyway, and Jien was forced to kill his mother to keep her from killing Gojyo; after this he left his home and brother, eventually pledging himself to Kougaiji's service. He's extremely loyal to Kougaiji, Dokugakuji himself believes he may have become attached to Kougaiji in this way for his vague resemblance of Gojyo, though he still seems to love his baby brother. He fights with a large sword which he is able to summon at will (there are only four characters in the series who are able to summon weapons this way: Gojyo, Goku, Dokugaku, and Yaone. No explanation is given as to the origin of Dokugaku's weapon). He generally serves as Gojyo's opponent. In the Japanese versions, he was voiced by Dai Matsumoto in the first series, Jurota Kosugi in Reload and Gunlock and Jin Yamanoi in Blast and ZEROIN. In the English version, his voice is done by Jason Miesse in episodes 5-18 and later by Mike MacRae in episodes 20-50 of the original series, Paul St. Peter in Reload and Gunlock, Josh Grelle in Blast, and by Andrew Love in ZEROIN.

=== Yaone ===
Yaone (八百鼡): An apothecary, alchemist, skilled fighter, and Lirin's "babysitter". She is deeply devoted to Kougaiji, who saved her from being sacrificed to the Centipede Demon, and has rashly taken on dangerous missions to prove her loyalty to him. As a trained chemist, she also serves as the group's healer. She seems to be friendly enemies with Hakkai; she always addresses him with great respect, and on occasions they work together. Hakkai regards her as a fellow-healer and colleague. In the Japanese version, she is voiced by Yuko Minaguchi, with the exception of the first OVA series, in which she was voiced by Tomoko Ishimura. In the English version, she is voiced by Shelley Calene-Black in the original series and ZEROIN, and by Mela Lee in Reload and Gunlock.

=== Gyokumen Koushou ===
'Gyokumen Koushu (玉面公主): Gyumaoh's concubine and the mastermind of the plan to revive him. She's extremely cruel and selfish, and has shown to be willing to sacrifice anything to get what she wants, and is shown to enjoy her cruel acts. Has told Kougaiji that she'll only restore his mother to life if he helps her obtain the Five Sacred Scriptures (or Sutras). Despite being Lirin's biological mother she cares nothing about her own daughter and only sees her and Kougaiji as tools. She is voiced by Shinobu Sato in the Japanese version and in the English version she is voiced by Kaytha Coker in the original series, Wendee Lee in Reload and Gunlock, Morgan Garrett in Blast, and by Joanne Bonass in ZEROIN.

=== Hazel ===
Hazel Grouse (ヘイゼル＝グロース): A foreigner who came to Tougenkyo from the far west continent across the sea. He is elegant and soft-spoken, and speaks fluently with the intonation peculiar to the western continent, He is quite confident and has a lot of words and deeds that rub people's nerves the wrong way. Uses a special resurrection technique that uses the soul of a youkai to revive dead humans.

he, like Sanzo, was taken in at a young age by a master who was killed by a youkai. He has sworn to wipe all youkai off of the planet and create a peaceful world for humans alone and has even stated that the lives of 1000 youkai are not worth one human life to him. He makes no exceptions when it comes to the youkai he kills: he sees them all as mindless beasts, berserk or sane, adult or child. He typically relies on his companion, Gat, to fight, but has proven himself as an exorcist able to fell many youkai at once. The pendant he wears around his neck (resembling a star of David) is able to store up to 13 souls (one in each opening), taken from dead or dying youkai, that he then transfers into dead humans, thus reviving them. The revived humans have yellow eyes and can be used as golems of a sort by Hazel to help him kill youkai. He is shown in a flashback as being a great student and devoted to his master, as his parents are dead. Hazel's behavior and affections (especially his relationship with Gat and love/hate relationship with Sanzo) could be interpreted as homosexual in nature. Hazel struggles with his suppressed youkai nature (the demon Varaharu) and eventually must face his demon head on, while in an encounter with Ukoku.

In the Reload Gunlock anime, Hazel has a different origin. He would often kill youkai, and was eventually punished for it by being turned into one himself, which resulted in him killing the priest who raised him. He continued killing youkai but was eventually killed by Gat, under the orders of the Great Spirit. However, Gat feels sorry for Hazel, so he then chooses to revive him by sharing his own life energy, which also gives Hazel's necklace the power to revive dead humans with youkai souls (in the anime, the mirror appears to be able to hold an infinite number of souls). However, Hazel's memories become altered to make him believe that he was the one who killed and revived Gato instead . In the finale of the series, Hazel attempts to kill Sanzo and revive him, in order to get Sanzo to join him in wiping out all demons, but Gojyo, Hakkai and Goku intervene and Gat is fatally injured in the ensuing battle. Before dying, he reveals the truth to Hazel, resulting in Hazel regaining his own true memories. Hazel is then defeated in his youkai form by the Sanzo party, and feeling that he has wasted his life, then asks Sanzo to kill him. Sanzo complies with his request, though before shooting Hazel he comforts him somewhat by telling him that nobody wastes their life. His voice is done by Kōichi Tōchika and as a child he is voiced by Shinobu Sato in the Japanese version. In the English version he is voiced by Patrick Seitz in Gunlock and Blake Jackson in ZEROIN, while his younger self is voiced by Yuri Lowenthal in Gunlock and Chaney Moore in ZEROIN.

=== Gato ===
Gatti "Gat" Nenehawk (ガト): A corpse who was revived by Hazel's resurrection technique, and acts together as his attendant. He is reticent and follows Hazel's orders absolutely. He has a large, muscular body, strong arms, and is agile in his movements. He wields two pistols.

Hazel's large bodyguard/traveling companion, he wields two Rugar .45s. He fights recklessly for Hazel because he can be instantly brought back to life or healed as long as Hazel has a soul stored in his pendant or there is a corpse nearby to take a soul from. His past is largely unknown except that he met Hazel several years before, was injured by him, but spared. He believes that being with and protecting Hazel is his destiny. He appears to be of Native American descent, and doesn't require sleep or food. He is said by Ukoku Sanzo to have been a young man of a tribe that worships nature and uses firearms. When the demons they had forged peace with attacked, Hazel tried to help. Gato originally opposed him and became the first human Hazel had ever mistakenly killed. He immediately was brought back, but his tribe saw him as an abomination against nature and shunned him. He is cut in half by Ukoku in Reload Volume 10, but not before asking Sanzo to take care of Hazel. There are undertones in Saiyuki which suggest a relationship between Hazel and Gato.

In the Reload Gunlock anime, Gato's origin is different. He lived in a native tribe (not stated where) that worshiped a being they called the Great Spirit. A group of hunters eventually came and started killing a large amount of the wildlife. Gato and his tribe tried to stop the hunters but were powerless against their guns. Gato, fatally wounded by a bullet, is revived by the Great Spirit and kills the hunters. He is then taken to Europe where Hazel is killing numerous demons and under the Great Spirit's orders reluctantly kills him (since Hazel was just a boy). Guilty of his actions, Gato asks the Great Spirit to revive Hazel with his life, which the Great Spirit does so, giving Hazel's necklace the ability to revive humans with youkai souls. Gato willing goes along with the charade the Great Spirit created until the finale of the series, where he decides to fight the Sanzo party without Hazel using any souls to revive him. As a result, they kill Gato, but before he dies he reveals the truth about Hazel's memories being altered. In the Japanese version, he is voiced by Rikiya Koyama while in the English version he is voiced by Beau Billingslea in Gunlock and Jovan Jackson in ZEROIN.

=== Homura ===
Homura Toushin Taishi (焔): a character added into the anime version of Saiyuki GensoMaden mid way into the series and becomes the main antagonist. Homura was stated to be the half-human grandson of the daughter of the King of the gods of Heaven with a human man from Earth (presumably inspired by the Taoist legend of The Cowherd and the Weaver Girl, involving the goddess Zhinu and her mortal lover Niulang). Although he succeeded Nataku Taishi (who destroyed Gyumaoh-Bull Satan 500 years ago), he eventually grows disgusted with the boring tranquility of the lazy life in Heaven. He had some relationship with Sanzo and his comrades. He calls them by their names from a previous existence. He comes to hate the system in Heaven since he was once romantically involved with a pureblood goddess, but the union between them was forbidden by his own maternal grandfather. As punishment, she was reincarnated on Earth and he was imprisoned in Heaven, in order to prevent a union between them, and she later died of old age while he continued to go on living. He is eager to get Sanzo's Evil Sutra, as his ultimate ambition seemed to be the creation of a perfect world with Son Goku as the catalyst for the creation of a new Heaven and Earth, and but it is shown near the end of Saiyuki Gensomaden, that he was actually looking to be defeated by somebody who is worthy of him, Son Goku—the "perfect world" being only a place where he could obtain the most honorable and worthy death. His motivation for this is that because he's half god, he would eventually die of old age, and because he was born a warrior god he felt that it was most fitting to die while fighting. He constantly observes the Sanzo party's movements, sometimes sending his underlings to fight them to push them to grow stronger or going to meet them in person (along with his two companions, Shion and Zenion) to do so, which always resulted in him brutally thrashing Goku. Though not truly evil at heart, Homura is nonetheless very ruthless and isn't bothered by sending others out to die, though he doesn't actively seek to kill others. Ultimately he doesn't believe in the existence of good or evil. He considered Zenion and Shion friends and was deeply affected by their deaths. His weapon is a flaming long sword possessing tremendous power. He can wipe out a troop of monsters at one swing. He uses the Power of Spirit, better known as Chi, like Cho Hakkai. He's always seen wearing a pair of handcuffs which serve as his power-limiters, and becomes far stronger when he takes them off. He's killed in the finale the Saiyuki Gensomaden anime by Goku, and at his request he is left to die in his own world. In the manga, Homura makes only a brief appearance in Saiyuki Gaiden, talking with Zenon and Shien. In the original Japanese version he is voiced by Toshiyuki Morikawa and in the English dub he is voiced by Jason Douglas.

=== Nataku ===
Nataku Taishi (闘神・哪吒太子): only appears in Saiyuki Gaiden and in the anime and briefly in the manga*War Prince Nataku: Nataku is based on the Taoist deity Nezha. He is a half-mortal war god who won the then-divine Son Goku (Sun Wukong)'s friendship, since both golden-eyed boys were branded as "heretical" beings due to the nature of their births. Unfortunately, Nataku falls into a catatonic state (the reasons for this are not disclosed in the anime) and sits in the divine garden of heaven with only the Goddess of Mercy to keep him company, staring blankly ahead for all time (it is implied by Kanzeon Bosatsu that he is waiting for Goku to return). In the series, Nataku is decidedly more somber than Goku and is resigned to being a puppet to the Gods, He was 'given the honor' of being the War Prince, a role which is later passed onto Homura. The title of "war prince" is more of a curse then an honor, since whoever has the title repeatedly sent into battle without any regard for their well-being. Feared and hated by most of the other gods for being too excessively powerful, a demon to the other gods, and he is shunned as a social misfit and lonely outcast, despite actually being the premier warrior of Heaven's army. In the anime, Nataku goes by a different title than in the manga, but his background is still very much the same - right down to his father (the overambitious and duplicitous Commander Li Touten), and the use of a long spear as a weapon of choice. It is gradually revealed that Li Touten is exploiting his son for fame and recognition from the rest of Heaven, and it is also implied that he is actually using him as tool in order to gain political power and influence among the other gods (reversing the traditional role in mythology that Nataku is actually to blame for his own misfortune). Nataku's father is later confronted by the past reincarnation of Cho Hakkai (Field Marshal Tenpou Gensui), and further mistreatment of his son is then yet to be seen in the series. In the Japanese version, Nataku is voiced by Kaho Koda and in the English dub he is voiced by Tony Oller in the original anime, Clint Bickham in Gaiden and Blast.

=== Zenon ===
Zenon (氮): comes down with Prince Homura only because he dislikes the evil monsters and spirits. Like Sanzo and Gojyo, he frequently smokes cigarettes and drinks alcohol. His revolving 'Demon Blaster' destroys dozen of monsters. His right eye is covered by a black patch. It is revealed that the eyepatch is his demon limiter, after he became a demon himself after having killed 1000 demons, and he goes berserk when he removes it. His full power in his true form is so great that if he stays in it too long he starts to lose all control of it. Zenon agrees to follow Homura for multiple reasons. One being he is disgusted of both life in Heaven and of living in general, another is that he wants to find the demon who killed his wife and son. Years ago, Zenon went freely between Earth and Heaven (the year was not specified in the anime) as an assassin for the gods. He eventually married a human woman who became pregnant with his son. The other gods found out about this, and Zenon agreed to give up his immortality and just live with his family as a human, since he preferred to live on earth anyway. However, one of his subordinates (who was a youkai), was told to bring his wife (and unborn son) to Heaven, but killed them instead. He kills the demon two episodes after his first appearance, but decides to stick with Homura to the end. He wields a banishing gun like Sanzo, only his has the form of an assault rifle. He dies in battle against Goyjo and Hakkai towards the end of Saiyuki Gensomaden. In the manga, Zenon makes only a brief appearance in Saiyuki Gaiden, talking with Homura and Shien. His voice actors are Jin Horikawa in Japanese and John Swasey in English.

=== Shien ===
Shien (紫炎): One of the heavenly people who act together with. He's the type who doesn't like useless killing, but he's completely unforgiving of those who get in the way of his goals or attack him. His weapon is a two-sword whip of light that he carries in his chest, and has the power and speed to cut an enemy in two without looking back.

comes down with Prince Homura for exciting adventures. He never harms anyone unless he has to defend himself. However, once getting in a battle, he is fierce, slaying the opponent with his twin 'Light Whips.' Despite that he nearly always lets the Sanzo party live when he fights them. He previously worked under War Prince Nataku, and wonders what Nataku saw in the human world, after the fight with Gyumaoh, as Nataku told him he wanted to stay longer. A celebration is held every year when he descends to view the scenery Nataku seemed to be most fond of. Despite his calm exterior, he's racked by the guilt that he followed the orders to not help Nataku against Gyumaoh. He wears a hair which later turns out to be a power limiter in his final fight against Hakkai in Saiyuki Gensomaden, where despite Shien's power he's killed by Hakkai when he was aided by Hakuryuu after Hakkai causes Shien to lose focus by playing on the fact that he hides his guilt. In the manga, Shien makes only a brief appearance in Saiyuki Gaiden, talking with Homura and Zenon. In the Japanese version he is voiced by Hiroshi Yanaka and in the English version he is voiced by Spike Spencer.

=== Zakuro ===
Zakuro (雀呂): He is a youkai villain who works for Ni Jianyi. He is an illusionist, who manipulates his enemy's mind by having them stare into his eyes. He encounters Sanzo, Hakkai, and Gojyo, and manages trap them within an illusion, but is eventually overpowered and escapes. Goku later finds Zakuro, who had become lost and collapsed due to dehydration and hunger. Goku gives him fruit and leads him to a stream, where they strike up a friendship. The two battle a small band of youkai, after which Zakuro learns of Goku's alliance. The defeated youkai, believing that Zakuro has joined Sanzo's group, leave to relay the news of Zakuro's apparent betrayal. Zakuro departs shortly after, attempting to clear up the mistake. In the animated series, Zakuro is shot by Gat and resurrected by Hazel. Zakuro attempts to shoot Sanzo, but the latter kills him once more. In the Japanese version, he is voiced by Kenyu Horiuchi. In the English version, he is voiced by Richard Cansino in Gunlock, Christopher Wehkamp in Blast, and by Kregg Dailey in ZEROIN.

== Other ==
=== Jeep ===
Jeep or Hakuryuu (はくりゅう): Although playful and unassuming this little dragon is an important part of Sanzo's team. He has the ability to turn into a jeep and as such, is the Sanzo gang's primary method of transportation. in the anime (though this version is also displayed in the manga on occasion), is Hakkai's pet dragon. Jeep has the ability to transform into a Jeep that the Sanzo party travel in. Though usually the size of a domestic cat, Jeep's transformation renders him much larger than his usual form. Jeep has also shown the ability to breathe fire. In his past life, he was actually the god Goujun, the Dragon King of the West and a commanding officer (Kenren Taisho's immediate superior) of Heaven's army. He is voiced by Kaoru Morota in Saiyuki, and by Tae Okajima and Eisuke Kotanizawa in Saiyuki Reload and Gunlock. As Goujun, he is voiced by Hiroki Touchi in both Gaiden and Blast. In the English dub his voice effects are done by Kelli Cousins in the original series and by Felecia Angelle in Blast.

=== Koumyou Sanzo ===
Koumyou Sanzo (光明三蔵): He is the previous Sanzo priest presiding over the Seiten and Maten sutra before Genjo Sanzo inherited them, he the master of Genjo Sanzo and the one who raised him. He picked him up as a baby who had been washed away by the river, and named him "Kouryuu" and raised him. He was a supreme priest with an easy-going and elusive personality who possessed two Seiten and Maten and "Magic Heaven", but he was attacked by a youkai and died while protecting the still young Genjo Sanzo.

=== Kanzeon Bosatsu ===
Kanzeon Bosatsu (観世音菩薩): The Merciful Goddess, also known as Kannon or Kuan Yin. The goddess Kanzeon is usually portrayed as female, but in our tale she's also a he. Although she looks pretty feminine, Kanzeon Bosatsu is a hermaphrodite. Whimsical and quirky, Kanzeon Bosatsu views the world as her playground, and although her intentions are good, isn't above causing a little mischief every now and then. The Buddhist bodhisattva Guan Yin. She is portrayed as a hermaphrodite in the manga, while in the anime it gives no indication of her being anything other than a gorgeous older woman. Extremely flirtatious, she actually rarely helps the Sanzo party, usually watching their travels on the way to India from Heaven for her mischievous amusement. She has only once directly intervened, the instance being when Goku's diadem had broken and Sanzo was unconscious and losing blood after sacrificing himself to save Goku from being killed by his childhood friend, the former Talisman Master of the monastery where Sanzo had been raised (who had been corrupted into becoming evil by his very own talismans). In the Japanese versions, she is voiced by Misa Watanabe in the original series and by Rei Igarashi in Reload and Gunlock. She was voiced by Karen Coffer for most episodes and occasionally by Shawn Taylor in the English dub of the first two seasons. In the English versions of Reload and Gunlock, she is voiced by Melodee M. Spevack and in the English version of Gaiden, Blast and ZEROIN her voice is done by Shelley Calene-Black.
