= Shiun Maru disaster =

1955 maritime incident in Japan

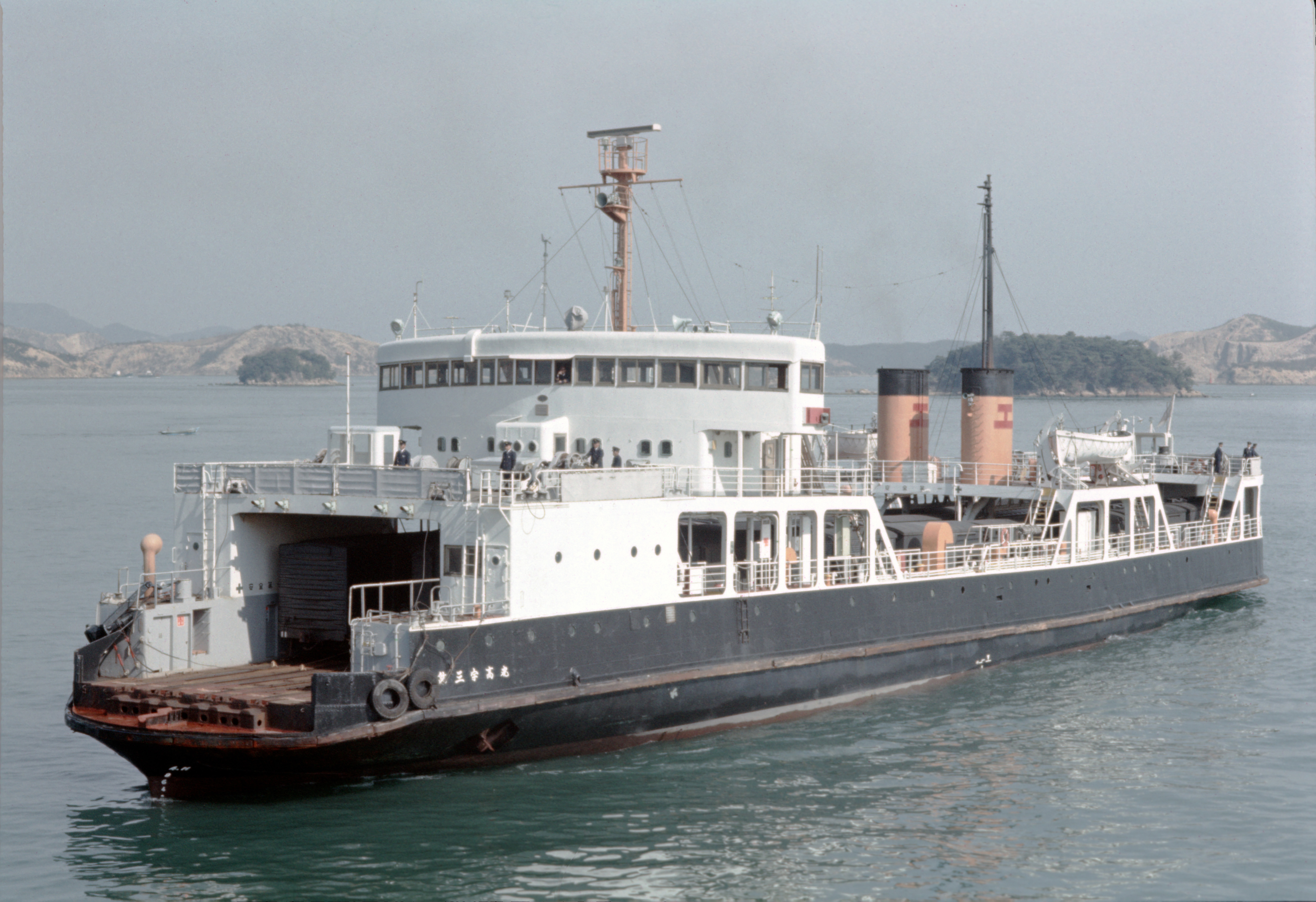
- The Ukō Maru
- Native name: 紫雲丸事故
- Date: May 11, 1955
- Location: Kanagawa Prefecture, Japan; 34°22′36.01″N 134°0′57.83″E
- Type: Ship collision
- Cause: Thick fog and lack of radar
- Deaths: 168

The Shiun Maru disaster (紫雲丸事故, Shiun Maru jiko) was a ship collision in Japan on 11 May 1955, during a school field trip, killing 168 people.

The Shiun Maru ferry sank in the Seto Inland Sea after colliding with a Japanese National Railways (JNR) ferry, the Ukō Maru (第三宇高丸), in thick fog. A lack of radar onboard contributed to the accident. The victims included 100 students from elementary and junior high schools in Shimane, Hiroshima, Ehime, and Kochi prefectures who were on school trips. The sinking of the Shiun Maru motivated the Japanese government to plan the Great Seto Bridge project, the longest two-tiered bridge system in the world.

The 1955 accident was the fifth such collision of vessels in the Seto Inland Sea since March 1950 and the second accident with fatalities.

== See also ==
- Akashi Kaikyō Bridge
