= Daizou Araki =

Japanese modern pentathlete (born 1955)

Personal information
- Born: 15 December 1955 (age 70)

Sport
- Sport: Modern pentathlon

Daizou Araki (荒木 大三, Araki Daizō) (born 15 December 1955) is a Japanese modern pentathlete. He competed at the 1984 Summer Olympics.
