= Akio Saito =

Japanese baseball player and coach

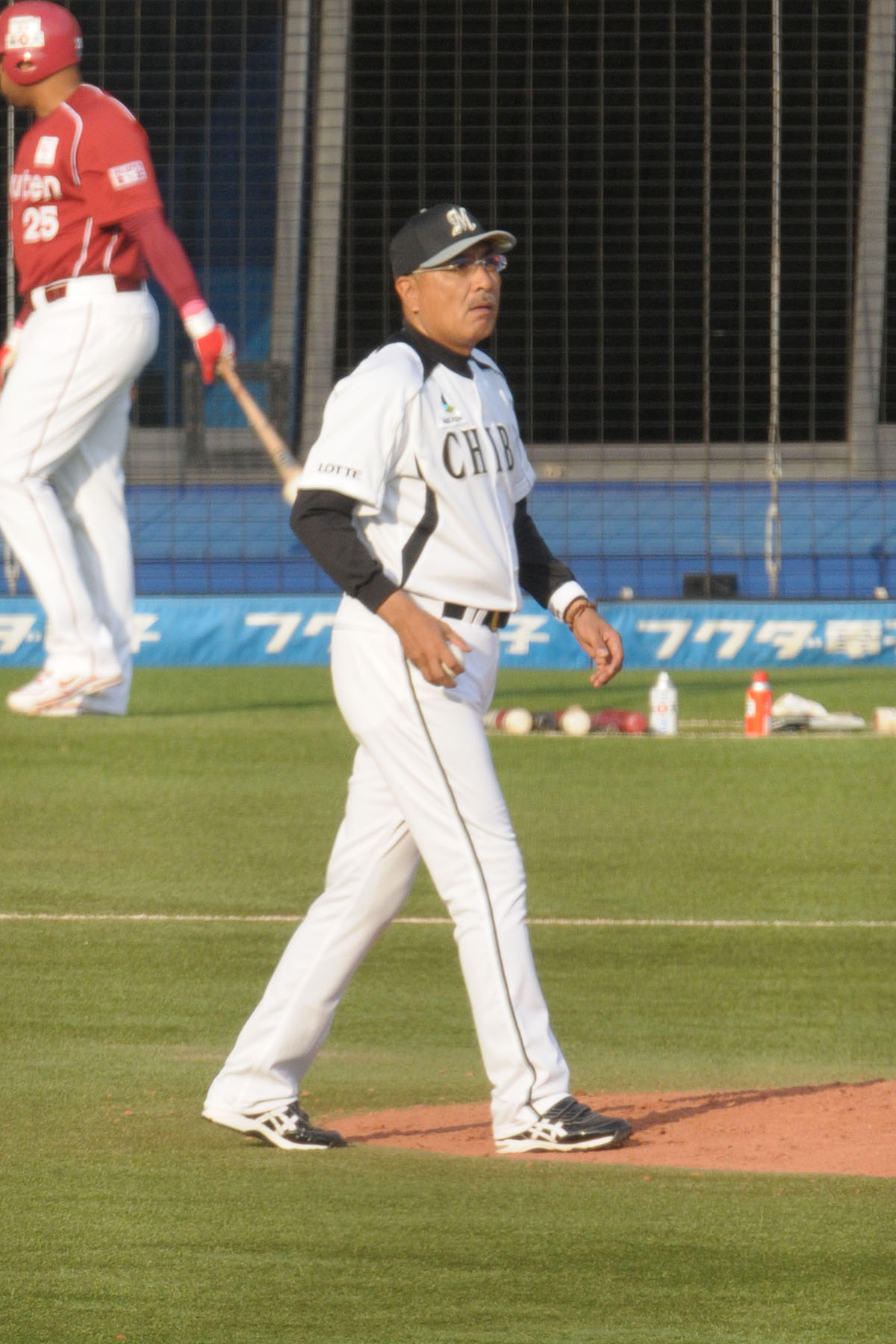
- Pitcher / Coach
- Born: February 23, 1955 (age 71); Saiki, Ōita, Japan
- Batted: Right Threw: Right

NPB debut
- May 8, 1977, for the Taiyō Whales

Last NPB appearance
- October 22, 1993, for the Yokohama BayStars

NPB statistics (through 1993)
- Win–loss record: 128-125
- Saves: 133
- ERA: 3.52
- Strikeouts: 1321
- Stats at Baseball Reference

Teams
- As player: Taiyō Whales/Yokohama Taiyō Whales/Yokohama BayStars (1977–1993); As coach: Yokohama BayStars (1993, 1996–1999, 2007–2008); Chiba Lotte Marines (2013–2014)

Career highlights and awards
- 1977 Central League Rookie of the Year; 1982 Central League ERA Champion; 1978 Central League Strikeout Champion; 6× NPB All-Star (1978, 1981–1983, 1985, 1987)
- Last updated on: 11 January 2016

Akio Saito (斉藤 明雄, born February 23, 1955) is a former Nippon Professional Baseball pitcher.
