= Nanami Kino =

Japanese handball player (born 1955)

Nanami Kino (紀野 奈々美, Kino Nanami; born 2 December 1955) is a Japanese former handball player who competed in the 1976 Summer Olympics.
