= So Much Love for You =

Single by Kokia

from the album Uta ga Chikara
- Released: April 21, 2004
- Genre: J-pop
- Length: 4:59
- Label: Victor Entertainment
- Songwriter: Kokia
- Producer: Daisuke Kahara

Kokia singles chronology
"The Power of Smile/Remember the Kiss" (2003)	"So Much Love for You" (2004)	"Yume ga Chikara" (2004)

"So Much Love for You" (stylised as so much love for you♡) is Kokia's 11th single, released on April 21, 2004.

== Background ==
"So Much Love for You" was the first single released after Kokia's commercially successful third album, Remember Me. During this stage of her career, Kokia had releases that generally charted in the low end of the top 40. The song was released two months after the announcement of Kokia's involvement with the 2004 Summer Olympics, after she was picked to sing the official encouragement song for the Japan team by the Japanese Olympic Committee

== Promotion ==
"So Much Love for You" was used as the theme song for the Fuji Television variety show U, Umain Desu. The B-side "New Season (Yume ni Mukatte Fuku Kaze)" also received some promotion, as it was used in commercials for the National Vocational School Publicity Research Society. Kokia was featured in many music-related magazines in April and May 2004, such as "CD Data," "Chai," "Gekkan Songs," "J Groove Magazine," "Kansai Isshūkan," "Myojo," "Newsmaker," "Sweet," "What's In?" and "Zappi." Kokia also had several regular appearances on TV shows in this time, such as on U-Wide Garden Music from the 12th to the 18th of April and TV Osaka Nude from the 19th to the 23rd of April.

== Composition ==
"So Much Love for You"
A clip from the leading track, "So Much Love for You."

"New Season (Yume ni Mukatte Fuku Kaze)"
A clip from the Kokia-arranged B-side "New Season (Yume ni Mukatte Fuku Kaze)."

"I Shiteru"
A clip from the B-side "I Shiteru."

"So Much Love for You" is an upbeat pop song. It is based around an arrangement of guitars and light percussion instruments, along with background piano and added sound effects. The chorus sections feature added bass/percussion. The lyrics talk about being in love. The song's protagonists says that she will feel happily in love no matter what they are looking at, and no matter where they are together. They ask their lover, who has "fallen ill with love," to embrace all of them, since they want to feel their true feelings from the voice in their heart.

Including the B-sides, all three songs on the single are upbeat pop songs with similar arrangements. "New Season" has an extremely similar arrangement to "So Much Love for You," except for added synthesisers used to create background percussion sounds and a greater focus on the piano in the song mixing. "I Shiteru," however, is based around stringed instruments, guitar and electronic sound effects. The lyrics of "New Season" talk about new beginnings. The person feels that a wind blowing towards tomorrow is calling them forward, and that they have a premonition something will happen if they go. Of "I Shiteru," the lyrics ask somebody if they know how much the song's protagonist cares about them.

== Music video ==
Kokia in the music video for "So Much Love for You."

The music video was directed by Shin'ichi Kudō (工藤伸一.) it is centred on four different scenes: shots of tall buildings, Kokia floating in a pink heart against a blue sky, Kokia on the top of a building with a pink heart balloon and two children dressed up in pink rabbit costumes, and shots of couples together in a sunny park. No two couples are the same in terms of race or age. While the first half of the video simply cuts between these scenes, in the second half the scenes start to change. The couples look up, and in the building shot musical notes begin to fall from the sky. The note heads are replaced with pink hearts. The couples then pose together with a gigantic pink heart.

== Chart ranking ==
Commercially, the song debuted at #40 in its first week, selling over 3,500 copies. It spent one further week in the top 100, and three further weeks placing between 100 and 200. By the end of its chart run, the single had sold 6,700 copies.

== Track listing ==
No.	Title	Writer(s)	Arranger(s)	Length
1.	"So Much Love for You"	Kokia	Daisuke Kahara	4:59
2.	"New Season (Yume ni Mukatte Fuku Kaze) (Ｎｅｗ ｓｅａｓｏｎ～夢に向かって吹く風～, New Season (Wind Blowing Towards Dreams))"	Kokia	Kokian's	3:26
3.	"I Shiteru (ｉしてる, I Love You)"	Kokia	Ryosuke Nakanishi	3:38
4.	"So Much Love for You (Instrumental Version)"	Kokia	Kahara	5:00
Total length:				17:03

== Japan Sales Rankings ==
Release	Chart	Peak position	First week sales	Sales total	Chart run
June 23, 2004	Oricon daily singles chart				
June 23, 2004	Oricon weekly singles chart	40	3,500	6,700	5 weeks
June 23, 2004	Oricon yearly singles chart				
