= Shinbo Nomura =

Japanese manga artist

Shinbo Nomura (のむら しんぼ, Nomura Shinbo; born Shin Nomura (野村 伸, Nomura Shin); 24 September 1955 in Minamikayabe, now part of Hakodate, Hokkaido) is a Japanese manga artist. He is best known as the author of the yonkoma manga Tsurupika Hagemaru (つるピカハゲ丸; lit. 'Little Baldy Hagemaru'), which was adapted as a 58-episode anime television series and for which he received the 1988 Shogakukan Manga Award for children's manga. He also later created a manga adaption of Ratchet & Clank.

He began his career as an assistant to Kenshi Hirokane.
