= Toshifumi Hinata =

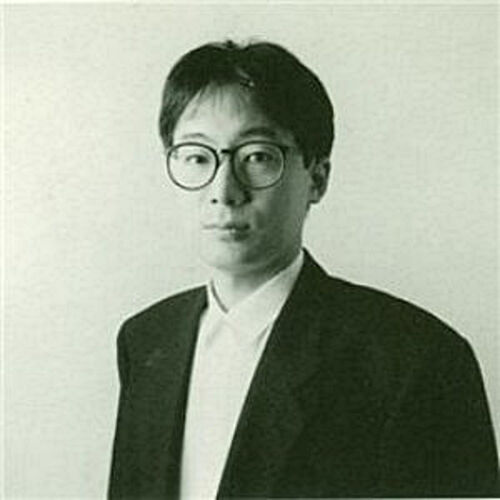

Background information
- Born: February 23, 1955 (age 71); Tokyo, Japan
- Genres: Orchestral music, Electronic music, New-age music
- Occupations: Musician, music composer
- Years active: 1982–present
- Labels: Sony Music, Alfa Records
- Website: toshifumihinata.com

Toshifumi Hinata is a Japanese classical musician and composer. He was born on February 23, 1955, in Tokyo, Japan. He has composed several albums and composed music for multiple films and television shows including Pavee Lackeen, Long Vacation and Tokyo Love Story.

== Early life ==
After graduating from high school, Hinata obtained a work visa and decided to move to the United Kingdom because he "had a strong desire to see the British music scene". He also worked at a motorcycle factory while in the United Kingdom. After working in the United Kingdom, he moved to the United States, where he began studying Environmental Studies at Northland College in 1975. It was there that he gained an interest in music and joined a blues band as a keyboard player. Hinata would transfer to the Berklee College of Music in 1976, and then finally transfer to the University of Minnesota, Duluth in 1978, where he majored in classical piano and studied theory, composition and orchestration under the tutelage of pianist Patricia Laliberte.

== Career ==
After graduating from the University of Minnesota-Duluth in 1982, Hinata began working as a musician in Minnesota. A year later in 1983, he became "disillusioned" with classical music and returned to Tokyo, where he began experimenting with his musical style by using analog synthesizers. It was there that he began creating music for several films and television shows such as Tokyo Love Story and Long Vacation. He composed Long Vacation together with his brother Daisuke Hinata.

Toshifumi Hinata and his music label Sony Music became a part of a lawsuit when his song Reflections was illegally sampled by the rapper Trefuego for his song 90mh. Trefuego was ordered to pay Sony Music over $800,000 in damages.
