= Hiroshi Nishihara =

Japanese chemist

- 西原寛
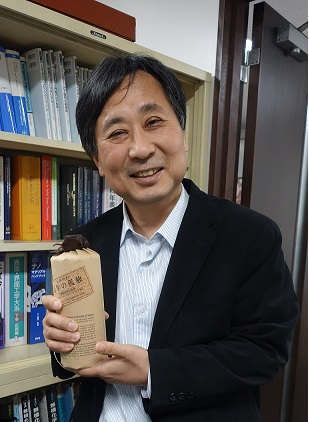
- Hiroshi Nishihara celebrating his 60th birthday. (March 21, 2015)
- Born: 21 March 1955 (age 71); Kagoshima Prefecture, Japan
- Scientific career
- Workplaces: University of Tokyo

Hiroshi Nishihara (西原寛, Nishihara Hiroshi), born 21 March 1955, is a Japanese chemist and Professor of Chemistry at The University of Tokyo in Japan. Currently heading the department of Chemistry and Inorganic Chemistry Laboratory in The University of Tokyo, he is a distinguished professor, researcher and pioneer in the field of synthesis and electrochemistry of conductive metal complex polymers.

His research is focused on creation of new electro- and photo-functional materials comprising both transition metals and π-conjugated chains, and invention of unidirectional electron transfer systems utilizing molecular layer interfaces. He is presently a Vice President of The Electrochemical Society of Japan, and the regional representative of Japan for International Society of Electrochemistry (ISE).

== Education and professional experiences ==
- 1977 B.Sc. (Chemistry), The University of Tokyo
- 1982 D.Sc. (Chemistry), The University of Tokyo (Professor Yukiyoshi Sasaki)
- 1982-1990 Research Associate, Faculty of Science and Technology, Keio University (Professor Kunitsugu Aramaki)
- 1987-1989 Visiting Research Associate, The University of North Carolina at Chapel Hill (Professor Royce W. Murray)
- 1990 Lecturer, Faculty of Science and Technology, Keio University
- 1992 Associate Professor, Faculty of Science and Technology, Keio University (Interface Chemistry)
- 1993-1996 Researcher, PRESTO, Japan Science and Technology Agency (Research Supervisor: Prof. K. Honda)
- 1996–Present Professor, Department of Chemistry, School of Science, The University of Tokyo (Inorganic Chemistry)

== Research interests ==
Coordination Chemistry, Organometallic Chemistry, Electrochemistry, Photochemistry, Nanomaterials

== Awards and honours ==
- 1994 Young Scholar Lectureship, The Chemical Society of Japan
- 2003 The Chemical Society of Japan Award for Creative Work for 2002
- 2005 Lectureship from University of Bordeaux I
- 2009 Professorship from University of Strasbourg
- 2011 Docteur Honoris Causa from University of Bordeaux I
- 2012 Lectured at Distinguished Lecture Series in Hong Kong Baptist University and won Lectureship.
- 2014 Fellow for Royal Society of Chemistry
- 2014 Japan's Ministry of Education, Culture, Sports, Science and Technology (MEXT) Award for Science and Technology 2014

== Reviews ==
- Kurihara, M.; Nishihara, H. (2002). "Azo-and quinone-conjugated redox complexes—photo-and proton-coupled intramolecular reactions based on d–π interaction". Coordination Chemistry Reviews. 226 (1): 125–135. doi:10.1016/s0010-8545(01)00421-0.
- Nishihara, H (2005). "Combination of redox-and photochemistry of azo-conjugated metal complexes". Coordination Chemistry Reviews. 249 (13): 1468–1475. doi:10.1016/j.ccr.2004.11.009.
- Nishihara, H.; Kanaizuka, K.; Nishimori, Y.; Yamanoi, Y. (2007). "Construction of redox-and photo-functional molecular systems on electrode surface for application to molecular devices". Coordination Chemistry Reviews. 251 (21): 2674–2687. doi:10.1016/j.ccr.2007.04.002.
- Allakhverdiev, S. I.; Thavasi, V.; Kreslavski, V. D.; Zharmukhamedov, S. K.; Klimov, V. V.; Ramakrishna, S.; Losa, D. A.; Mimurod, M.; Nishiharae, H.; Carpentierf, R. (2010). "Photosynthetic hydrogen production". Journal of Photochemistry and Photobiology C: Photochemistry Reviews. 11 (2): 101–113. doi:10.1016/j.jphotochemrev.2010.07.002.
- Sakamoto, R.; Rao, K. P.; Nishihara, H. (2011). "Arylethynylanthraquinone and Bis (arylethynyl) anthraquinone: Strong Donor-Acceptor Interaction and Proton-induced Cyclization to Form Pyrylium and Dipyrylium Salts". Chemistry Letters. 40 (12): 1316–1326. doi:10.1246/cl.2011.1316.
- Sakamoto, R.; Katagiri, S.; Maeda, H.; Nishihara, H. (2013). "Bis (terpyridine) metal complex wires: Excellent long-range electron transfer ability and controllable intrawire redox conduction on silicon electrode". Coordination Chemistry Reviews. 257 (9): 1493–1506. doi:10.1016/j.ccr.2012.08.025.
- Nishihara, H (2014). "Coordination Programming-A Concept for the Creation of Multifunctional Molecular Systems". Chem. Lett. 43 (4): 388–395. doi:10.1246/cl.140010.
- Sakamoto, R.; Wu, K. H.; Matsuoka, R.; Maeda, H.; Nishihara, H. (2015). "π-Conjugated bis (terpyridine) metal complex molecular wires". Chemical Society Reviews. 44 (21): 7698–7714. doi:10.1039/C5CS00081E. PMID 25864838.
- Guldi, D. M.; Nishihara, H.; Venkataraman, L. (2015). "Molecular wires". Chemical Society Reviews. 44 (4): 842–844. doi:10.1039/c5cs90010g. PMID 25636152.
