= Shinobu Sato =

Japanese classical guitarist (born 1955)

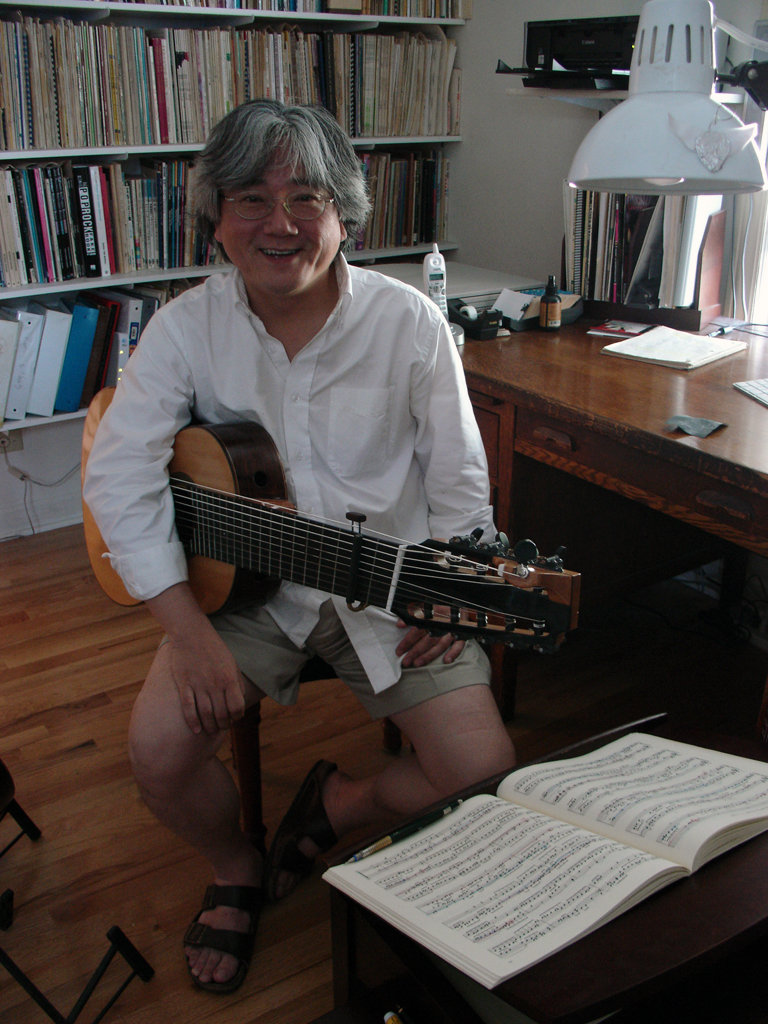

Background information
- Born: June 5, 1955 (age 69)
- Origin: Kobe, Japan
- Genres: Classical; Folk; Jazz
- Occupation(s): Guitarist, teacher, composer
- Years active: 1988-present
- Labels: Waterbug Records, Flying Fish Records

Shinobu Sato (born June 5, 1955), is a Japanese classical artist. Shinobu debuted in 1988 with the tape Red Dragonfly: World Music on Guitar, which was released on audio CD in 1992. His second major album, Little Signs of Autumn was released on audio CD in 1994.

== Biography ==
=== Early life ===
Shinobu was born in Kobe, Japan, and began playing the acoustic guitar at the age of 13. He emigrated to the United States in 1979 after meeting his future wife Katherine Larson. He has the ability to play the guitar either left- or right-handed.

=== Early career ===
Shinobu began working in Los Angeles, California as a waiter, while trying to establish his career as a musician. He received his economics degree in Japan and his masters in Music History and Guitar from Northeastern Illinois University.

=== Current work ===
Shinobu teaches guitar to students of all ages throughout the northside of Chicago, Illinois.

== Personal life ==
Shinobu is father to 37-year-old Ian Junpei Sato, 34-year-old Colin Makito Sato, and 29-year-old Maya Hikari Sato. He married Katherine Larson, an associate professor in the English Language Academy at the DePaul University, in 1983.

== Discography ==
- 1988: Red Dragonfly: World Music on Guitar
- 1992: On This Day Earth Shall Ring: Songs for Christmas
- 1994: Little Signs of Autumn
