= Don't Be Dumb Tour =

2026 concert tour by ASAP Rocky

Don't Be Dumb World Tour
- Tour by A$AP Rocky
- Promotional poster for the tour.
- Location: Europe; North America; Oceania
- Associated album: Don't Be Dumb
- Start date: May 27, 2026
- End date: December 17, 2026
- Legs: 3
- No. of shows: 54
- Supporting act: Thoto
- Producer: Live Nation; Cash App; Visa

A$AP Rocky concert chronology
- Injured Generation Tour (2019); Don't Be Dumb Tour (2026)

The Don't Be Dumb Tour is the second headlining concert tour by American rapper A$AP Rocky. The tour began on May 27, 2026, at the United Center in Chicago, and is set to conclude on December 17, 2026, at the RAC Arena in Perth. The tour supports Rocky's fourth studio album, Don't Be Dumb (2026), his first full-length album in nearly eight years.

== Background and promotion ==
This tour marked Rocky's return to headlining shows since his 2019 Injured Generation Tour and brought him across North America and Europe, with a total of 43 concerts at arena venues and festival appearances. General ticket sales began on January 27, 2026. In October 2026, an Oceania leg of the tour was announced.

== Set list ==
The following set list is from the show at the United Center in Chicago on May 27, 2026. It does not represent all concerts for the duration of the tour.

1. "Grim Freestyle"
2. "Trunks"
3. "Highjack"
4. "Order of Protection"
5. "Helicopter"
6. "Swat Team"
7. "Stole Ya Flow"
8. "Praise the Lord (Da Shine)"
9. "A$AP Forever"
10. "Tailor Swif"
11. "Riot (Rowdy Pipe'n)"
12. "No Trespassing"
13. "Stop Snitching"
14. "Playa"
15. "Stfu"
16. "Punk Rocky"
17. "Sundress"
18. "American Sabotage" (with Tommy Revenge & Thoto)
19. "December 31st" (Ty Dolla Sign song with Tommy Revenge & Thoto)
20. "Middle Fingers" (with Tommy Revenge & Thoto)
21. "Gemstones It's tha Gr1m" (with Tommy Revenge & Thoto)
22. "No Limit" (G-Eazy song)
23. "R. Cali"
24. "Telephone Calls" (ASAP Mob song)
25. "Pick It Up" (Famous Dex song)
26. "Fukk Sleep"
27. "Multiply"
28. "Yamborghini High (ASAP Mob song)
29. "Purple Swag
30. "Peso"
31. "LVL"
32. "Wassup"
33. "Fashion Killa"
34. "Everyday"
35. "Long Live ASAP"
36. "Stay Here 4 Life
37. "LSD"
38. "Don’t Be Dumb/Trip Baby"
39. "Lord Pretty Flacko Jodye 2 (LPFJ2)"

=== Additional notes ===
- June 12, 2026 - Charlotte: DaBaby made a guest appearance.
- June 27, 2026 - Los Angeles: Danny Elfman performed "Punk Rocky" and "Sundress" with Rocky. Tyler, the Creator performed "Earfquake".
- July 11, 2026 - Newark: Ice Spice performed "Deli". 50 Cent, Tony Yayo, and Uncle Murda performed "What Up Gangsta," "Many Men," "P.I.M.P.", and "In Da Club".
- October 25, 2026 - Paris: Tyler, the Creator and Rocky performed "Who Dat Boy" and "Potato Salad". A$AP Twelvyy and Rocky performed "Yamborghini High" and "Hella Hoes".

== Tour dates ==
List of 2026 concerts, showing date, city, country, venue, opening act, attendance and revenue
Date	City	Country	Venue	Opening acts	Attendance	Revenue
May 27	Chicago	United States	United Center	Thoto	TBA	
May 29	Cleveland	United States	Rocket Arena	Thoto	TBA	
May 31	Toronto	Canada	Scotiabank Arena	Thoto	TBA	
June 1	Montreal	Canada	Bell Centre	Thoto	TBA	
June 2	Boston	United States	TD Garden	Thoto	TBA	
June 4	Philadelphia	United States	Xfinity Mobile Arena	Thoto	TBA	
June 7 (Note: Part of Governors Ball Music Festival.)	Flushing	United States	Flushing Meadows Corona Park	—N/a		
June 8	Baltimore	United States	CFG Bank Arena	Thoto	TBA	
June 11	Atlanta	United States	State Farm Arena	Thoto	TBA	
June 12	Charlotte	United States	Spectrum Center	Thoto	TBA	
June 14	Orlando	United States	Kia Center	Thoto	TBA	
June 15	Miami	United States	Kaseya Center	Thoto	TBA	
June 18	Dallas	United States	American Airlines Center	Thoto	TBA	
June 19	Austin	United States	Moody Center	Thoto	TBA	
June 20	Houston	United States	Toyota Center	Thoto	TBA	
June 23	Phoenix	United States	Mortgage Matchup Center	Thoto	TBA	
June 25	San Francisco	United States	Chase Center	Thoto	TBA	
June 26	Las Vegas	United States	MGM Grand Garden Arena	Thoto	TBA	
June 27	Los Angeles	United States	Kia Forum	Thoto	TBA	
June 30	Seattle	United States	Climate Pledge Arena	Thoto	TBA	
July 1	Vancouver	Canada	Rogers Arena	Thoto	TBA	
July 3	Edmonton	Canada	Rogers Place	Thoto	TBA	
July 4 (Note: Part of Calgary Stampede.)	Calgary	Canada	Scotiabank Saddledome	—N/a		
July 8	Detroit	United States	Little Caesars Arena	Thoto	TBA	
July 11	Newark	United States	Prudential Center	Thoto	TBA	
August 25	Brussels	Belgium	ING Arena	Thoto	TBA	
August 27	Amsterdam	Netherlands	Ziggo Dome	Thoto	TBA	
August 30	London	England	The O_{2} Arena	Thoto	TBA	
September 2	Dublin	Ireland	3Arena	Thoto	TBA	
September 4	Glasgow	Scotland	OVO Hydro	Thoto	TBA	
September 5	Manchester	England	Co-op Live	Thoto	TBA	
September 8	Cologne	Germany	Lanxess Arena		TBA	
September 10 (Note: Part of I-Days Milano.)	Milan	Italy	Ippodromo Snai San Siro	—N/a		
September 11	Munich	Germany	Olympiahalle	Thoto	TBA	
September 13	Łódź	Poland	Atlas Arena	Thoto	TBA	
September 14	Łódź	Poland	Atlas Arena	Thoto	TBA	
September 16	Hamburg	Germany	Barclays Arena	Thoto	TBA	
September 18	Copenhagen	Denmark	Royal Arena	Thoto	TBA	
September 20	Oslo	Norway	Unity Arena	Thoto	TBA	
September 21	Stockholm	Sweden	Avicii Arena	Thoto	TBA	
September 24	Riga	Latvia	Xiaomi Arena	Thoto	TBA	
September 25	Kaunas	Lithuania	Žalgiris Arena	Thoto	TBA	
September 28	Berlin	Germany	Uber Arena	Thoto	TBA	
September 30	Paris	France	Accor Arena	Thoto	TBA	
October 4	Prague	Czech Republic	O2 Arena	Thoto	TBA	
October 5	Budapest	Hungary	László Papp Budapest Sports Arena	Thoto	TBA	
October 6	Zagreb	Croatia	Arena Zagreb	Thoto	TBA	
October 8	Belgrade	Serbia	Belgrade Arena	Thoto	TBA	
October 9	Sofia	Bulgaria	Arena 8888	Thoto	TBA	
October 11	Athens	Greece	Telekom Center Athens	Thoto	TBA	
December 5	Melbourne	Australia	Rod Laver Arena	TBA	TBA	
December 7	Melbourne	Australia	Rod Laver Arena	TBA	TBA	
December 9	Sydney	Australia	Afterpay Arena	TBA	TBA	
December 10	Sydney	Australia	Afterpay Arena	TBA	TBA	
December 12	Auckland	New Zealand	Spark Arena	TBA	TBA	
December 14	Brisbane	Australia	Entertainment Centre	TBA	TBA	
December 17	Perth	Australia	RAC Arena	TBA	TBA	
