= 2025 UK Music Video Awards =

- Date: 30 October 2025
- Location: Magazine London, London
- Hosted by: Ana Matronic
- Most wins: A$AP Rocky (5)
- Most nominations: FKA twigs (9)
- Website: www.ukmva.com

The 2025 UK Music Video Awards were held on 30 October 2025, in London, with the purpose of recognising the best in music videos and music film making from United Kingdom and worldwide delivered between August 2024 and August 2025. The ceremony took place at Magazine London for the fourth consecutive time, with American singer and former Scissor Sisters frontwoman Ana Matronic serving as host for the third year in a row.

Nominations were announced on 30 September 2025. FKA twigs led the nominations with nine (including six for her music video "Eusexua"), followed by A$AP Rocky and Little Simz with five each, Sabrina Carpenter, Doechii and Wolf Alice, all three with four, and Travis Scott with three. Jazz music videos are now included in the R&B / Soul categories while the awards for Best Low Budget Video and Best Casting in a Video were introduced.

"Tailor Swif", performed by A$AP Rocky and directed by Vania Heymann and Gal Muggia, won Video of the Year. It was also the most awarded video during the ceremony with four additional wins. American musician and lead singer of OK Go received the Icon Award while American music video director and choreographer Diane Martel was honoured with the Legend Award posthumously.

The 2025 awards also marked the launch of the British Music Video Association (BMVA) and its opening campaign for Music Video Tax Relief.

== Video of the Year ==
Video of the Year
- A$AP Rocky – "Tailor Swif"
  (Directors: Vania Heymann & Gal Muggia)

== Video Genre Categories ==
Best Pop Video – UK	Best Pop Video – International
FKA twigs – "Eusexua" (Director: Jordan Hemingway); Lola Young – "One Thing" (Director: Dave Meyers); Charli XCX – "party 4 u" (Director: Mitch Ryan); FKA twigs – "Perfect Stranger" (Director: Jordan Hemingway); Elton John – "Step into Christmas" (Director: Dan French); PinkPantheress – "Tonight" (Director: Charlotte Rutherford)	Sabrina Carpenter – "Manchild" (Directors: Vania Heymann & Gal Muggia); Billie Eilish – "Birds of a Feather" (Director: Aiden Zamiri); Theodora – "Fashion Designa" (Director: Melchior Leroux); Jackson Wang – "High Alone" (Director: Rodrigo Inada); Addison Rae – "High Fashion" (Director: Mitch Ryan); Chappell Roan – "The Subway" (Director: Amber Grace Johnson)
Best R&B / Soul / Jazz Video – UK	Best R&B / Soul / Jazz Video – International
Celeste – "This is Who I Am" (Director: Celeste); Sekou – "Catching Bodies" (Director: Iggy London); Joy Crookes – "Mathematics" (Director: Jake Erland); Celeste – "On with the Show" (Director: Rodrigo Inada); Obongjayar – "Sweet Danger" (Director: Sophie Jones); Oscar Jerome – "The Fork" (Director: Milo Blake)	Audrey Nuna – "Mine" (Director: Zac Dov Wiesel); Saint Jhn – "Body on Me" (Director: Alex Gargot); Amaarae – "S.M.O." (Director: Omar Jones); Yves Jarvis – "The Knife in Me" (Director: Derek Branscombe); Bricknasty – "Vinland" (Director: Hugh Mulhern); Rimon – "Where Do We Go?" (Director: Gabriel Dugué)
Best Dance / Electronic Video – UK	Best Dance / Electronic Video – International
Leon Vynehall – "Cruel Love" (Director: Alex Takács); Maribou State – "All I Need" (Director: Giordano Maestrelli); Disclosure – "Arachnids" (Director: Uncanny); Rival Consoles – "Gaivotas" (Director: Vincent Duluc-David); Mura Masa – "Jump" (Director: The Reids); Rival Consoles – "Soft Gradient Beckons" (Director: Anthony Dickenson)	DJ Snake featuring Amadou & Mariam – "Patience" (Director: Valentin Guiod); Dom Dolla – "Dreamin" (Director: Kyle Caulfrield & Shevin Dissanayake); Bad Bunny – "Nuevayol" (Director: Renell Medrano); DJ Snake with J Balvin – "Noventa" (Director: Luis Rojo); Tommy Cash – "Untz Untz" (Director: Alina Pasok & Tommy Cash); Didi Han – "Youth" (Director: Ludovic Gontrand)
Best Rock Video – UK	Best Rock Video – International
Wolf Alice – "Bloom Baby Bloom" (Director: Colin Solal Cardo); White Lies – "In the Middle" (Director: Andreas Nilsson); Sam Fender – "People Watching" (Director: Stuart McIntyre); Sam Fender – "Remember My Name" (Director: Hector Dockrill); Wolf Alice – "The Sofa" (Director: Fiona Jane Burgess); Yungblud – "Zombie" (Director: Charlie Sarsfield)	OK Go – "Love" (Directors: Damian Kulash, Aaron Duffy, and Miguel Espada); Viagra Boys – "Bog Body" (Director: Eoin Glaister); Fontaines D.C. – "It's Amazing to Be Young" (Director: Luna Carmoon); Turnstile – "Never Enough" (Directors: Brendan Yates & Pat McCrory); Talking Heads – "Psycho Killer" (Director: Mike Mills); Clap Your Hands Say Yeah – "The Skin of My Yellow Country Teeth" (Directors: David M Helman & Daniel Henry)
Best Alternative Video – UK	Best Alternative Video – International
FKA twigs – "Striptease" (Director: Jordan Hemingway); The Irrepressibles – "Destination" (Director: Jack Willoughby); Novo Amor – "Earth Defender" (Directors: Sil van der Woerd, Jorik Dozy & Kynan Tegar); Geordie Greep – "Holy, Holy" (Directors: Ethan & Tom); Bakar – "Lonyo!" (Director: Tom Emmerson); Gunship – "Tech Noir 2" (Director: Lee Hardcastle)	Cults – "Onions" (Director: Alice Fassi); Oracle Sisters – "Blue Left Hand" (Director: Jim Longden); Cero Ismael – "Driving Round Looking for Unknown" (Directors: Folkert Verdoorn & Simon Becks); Lorde – "Hammer" (Director: Renell Medrano); Clairo – "Juna" (Director: Bradley J Calder); Geese – "Taxes" (Director: Noel Paul)
Best Hip Hop / Grime / Rap Video – UK	Best Hip Hop / Grime / Rap Video – International
Kae Tempest – "Statue in the Square" (Directors: Boy Dykes (Juliette Larthe, Jess Kohl, Lydia Garnett, Jesse Glazzard, and Romeo Roxman Gatt)); AJ Tracey – "3rd Time Lucky" (Directors: Late Milk & Dario Imbrogno); Little Simz featuring Obongjayar & Moonchild Sanelly – "Flood" (Director: Salomon Ligthelm); Pozer – "Habits" (Director: Lauzza); Fuse ODG – "Sundiata" (Director: Christian Saint); Little Simz – "Young" (Director: Dave Meyers)	A$AP Rocky – "Tailor Swif" (Directors: Vania Heymann & Gal Muggia); Travis Scott – "4x4" (Director: Gabriel Moses); Doechii – "Anxiety" (Director: James Mackel); Clipse and Kendrick Lamar – "Chains & Whips" (Director: Gabriel Moses); Doechii – "Denial Is a River" (Director: James Mackel); Paris Texas – "They Left Me with a Gun/Sword" (Director: Dan Streit)
Best Pop / R&B / Soul / Jazz Video – Newcomer	Best Rock / Alternative Video – Newcomer
Olivia Dean – "Nice to Each Other" (Director: Jake Erland); Addison Rae – "Aquamarine" (Director: Sean Price Willis); Louis Culture featuring Tora-i & Richie – "Babe" (Director: Ella Exieke); The Chainsmokers – "Helium" (Director: Alex Acy); Danna – "Khe Calor" (Director: Olivia de Camps); Isabella Lovestory – "Vanity" (Director: Tohé Commaret)	Fontaines D.C. – "In the Modern World" (Director: Luna Carmoon); Kean Kavanagh – "A Cowboy Song" (Directors: Kojaque & Robert Bass); Lil Chick – "Downpour" (Directors: Alex Acy & Rémi Belleville); Lowswimmer – "Irl" (Directors: Victor Mauwynch & Leo Villares); Baxter Dury – "Schadenfreude" (Director: Gareth Bowen); Club Kuru – "Sunshine Kiss the Water" (Director: Thomas Bridgen)
Best Dance / Electronic Video – Newcomer	Best Hip Hop / Grime / Rap Video – Newcomer
Tinie Tempah x Skepsis – "Eat It Up" (Director: Yeeiid); Prince 95 – "Electronic Talk" (Director: Holy Magury); Confidence Man featuring JADE – "Gossip" (Director: India Rose Harris); Tommy Holohan x Megra – "Show Me the Sky" (Director: Will Wightman); Jorja Smith – "With You" (Director: Ivor Lawson-Adamah); Kettama & Interplanetary Criminal – "Yosemite" (Director: Joey Knox)	Archy Moor – "Robbery Rings" (Director: Nicolas De Sola); Rushy – "Hooligan" (Director: Don Prod); Clovis – "Les Cigales" (Director: Alvynn Diagne); Loyle Carner – "Lyin" (Director: Ben Coule-Larner); Lujipeka – "Paulise" (Director: Alex Acy); Jme & 8syn – "TMNT" (Director: Will Norman)
Best Low Budget Video
Squid – "Cro-Magnon Man" (Director: Rory Alexander Stewart); Swaggerboyz x Dillom – "El Morocho, el Rubio y el Colo" (Directors: Santi Chaher & Kevin Zeta); Sam Akpro – "Evenfall" (Director: Pedro Takahashi); Juan Duarte – "Maquina Latina" (Director: Boy Princess); Archy Moor – "Robbery Rings" (Director: Nicolas de Sola); Jessica2010 – "Week Ago" (Director: Martin Pihlap)

== Technical and Craft Categories ==
Best Performance in a Video	Best Casting in a Video
Doechii – "Denial Is a River" (Performer: Doechii); FKA twigs – "Eusexua" (Performer: FKA twigs); Doechii – "Anxiety" (Performer: Doechii); Little Simz featuring Obongjayar & Moonchild Sanelly – "Flood" (Performers: Little Simz, Obongjayar & Moonchild Sanelly); Sabrina Carpenter – "Manchild" (Performer: Sabrina Carpenter); Talking Heads – "Psycho Killer" (Performer: Saoirse Ronan)	Bakar – "Lonyo!" (Casting Director: Selma Nicholls); Disclosure – "Arachnids" (Casting Directors: Cali Nice, Osmosis Casting & Molly Peachey Pape); Sekou – "Catching Bodies" (Casting Director: Frankie Spencer at Scene Casting); Clipse and Kendrick Lamar – "Chains & Whips" (Casting Director: Esprit Casting); Alabaster DePlume – "Invincibility" (Casting Director: Ginny Kerr); Hannah Holland – Last Exit on Bethnal (Casting Directors: Lydia Garnett, Celeste Doig & Hannah Holland)
Best Production Design in a Video	Best Styling in a Video
A$AP Rocky – "Tailor Swif" (Production Designer: Misha Levchenko); Jisoo – "Earthquake" (Production Designer: Alexander Delgado); Manizha – "Gun" (Production Designer: Alexey Yandovskiy); OK Go – "Love" (Production Designer: Will Field); Sabrina Carpenter – "Manchild" (Production Designer: Miranda Lorenz); Cults – "Onions" (Production Designer: Matt Toth)	Yung Lean – "Forever Yung" (Stylist: Desiree Laidler); Wolf Alice – "Bloom Baby Bloom" (Band Stylist: Gary David Moore; Cast Stylist: Lucy James); FKA twigs – "Eusexua" (Stylist: Georgia Pendlebury); Haim – "Relationships" (Stylist: Erin Benach); Fuse ODG – "Sundiata" (Stylist: Mohammed Blakk); A$AP Rocky – "Tailor Swif" (Stylist: Galina Sokolovska)
Best Cinematography in a Video	Best Cinematography in a Video – Newcomer
A$AP Rocky – "Tailor Swif" (Cinematographer: Denys Lushchyk); Travis Scott – "4x4" (Cinematographer: Jake Gabbay); Travis Scott – "Drugs You Should Try It" (Cinematographer: Norm Li); FKA twigs – "Eusexua" (Cinematographer: Daniel Landin); Little Simz featuring Obongjayar & Moonchild Sanelly – "Flood" (Cinematographer: Rina Yang); Sabrina Carpenter – "Manchild" (Cinematographer: Chris Ripley)	Son Lux – "Flickers" (Cinematographer: Mikuláš Hrdlička); Guitarricadelafuente – "Babieca!" (Cinematographer: Juanjo L. Salazar); Madeleine Rose Witney – "Behind Those Eyes" (Cinematographer: Chaimuki); Common Saints – "Equinox" (Cinematographer: Ravi Doubleday); Blondshell – "Event of a Fire" (Cinematographer: Bernardo Infante); Marina Satti – "Lola" (Cinematographer: Toby Leary)
Best Colour Grading in a Video	Best Colour Grading in a Video – Newcomer
Rubel – "Ouro/Reckoner" (Colourist: Osmar Junior); Billie Eilish – "Birds of a Feather" (Colourist: Dante Pasquinelli); Jackson Wang – "High Alone" (Colourist: Luke Morrison); Birnir – "LXS" (Colourist: Tim Smith); Bad Bunny – "Nuevayol" (Colourist: Dante Pasquinelli); Conan Gray – "Vodka Cranberry" (Colourist: Sofie Borup)	Rüfüs Du Sol – "Break My Love" (Colourist: Sharon Chung); Joy Orbison – "Bastard" (Colourist: Nielsan Bohl); Trees Speak – "Forever Chemicals" (Colourist: Lois Chapman); Sigrid – "Jellyfish" (Colourist: Thomas Kumeling); Rizzle Kicks – "New Sport" (Colourist: Fraser Twitchett); Chase tha Worst featuring Yorke, Dan Parties & Tara Salerno – "Tiefs" (Colourist: Mara Ciorba)
Best Editing in a Video	Best Editing in a Video – Newcomer
FKA twigs – "Eusexua" (Editor: Charlie Von Rotberg); Disclosure – "Arachnids" (Editor: Elliot Elder); Sam Fender – "People Watching" (Editor: Talia Pasqua); Damiano David – "Silverlines" (Editor: Aaron Saiki); Clap Your Hands Say Yeah – "The Skin of My Yellow Country Teeth" (Editor: Zaldy Lopez); Fortuno – "Wanna Believe U" (Editors: Jacques Simon & Anders Mills)	Clovis – "Les Cigales" (Editors: Alvynn Diagne & Terence Nury); Tinie Tempah x Skepsis – "Eat It Up" (Editor: Ipek Kadri); Alabaster DePlume – "Invincibility" (Editor: Eden Read); Partiboi69 & Skream – "Pound Town" (Editor: David Tse); The Knocks featuring Powers – "Stay Gold" (Editors: Corey Wadden & Alexander Farah); Kettama & Interplanetary Criminal – "Yosemite" (Editor: David Tse)
Best Choreography in a Video	Best Visual Effects in a Video
FKA twigs – "Eusexua" (Choreographer: Zoï Tatopoulos); Wolf Alice – "Bloom Baby Bloom" (Choreographer: Ryan Heffington); FKA twigs – "Childlike Things" (Choreographer: Robbie Blue); Little Simz featuring Obongjayar & Moonchild Sanelly – "Flood" (Choreographer: Kloe Dean); Jungle – "Keep Me Satisfied" (Choreographer: Shay Latukolan); Bakar – "Lonyo!" (Choreographers: Joe Adams, Jordan J Funk & Aisha Ahumah)	A$AP Rocky – "Tailor Swif" (VFX Artists: Vania Heymann & Tal Baltuch); Izzy Spears – "Burn" (VFX Artists: Pavel Tchugunov, Artem Shcherbakov, Aleksandr Makedonsky & Alex Kozirev); Jisoo – "Earthquake" (VFX Artists: Abyss Digital); Don Toliver featuring Doja Cat – "Lose My Mind" (VFX Supervisor: Thomas Dairain & Sébastien Terme; VFX: Sandra Germain, Christian Kelly & Augustin Vernier; 3D Artists: Alexis Dubor, Thomas Bertrand, Andrea Oguey, Pierre Dussaule, Florian Leroy, Thomas Nautin, Dimitri Alloneau, Moïse Hergaux-Essame, Remy Maatouk, Ludovic Paul, Julien Favini & Jules-Baptiste Giraud; Tracking: Adrien Delecroix; Compositing Artists: Alexandre Moukala-Pez, Tina Dardenne Fallet, Frédéric Azais, Julien Michel, Sébastien Folio, Romain Froment, Matthieu Richet & Fabien Delavous; Flame: Vincent Blin, Philippe Bienvenue & Luc Bellerive; I/O Team: Pierre de Fraguier & Selim Medden); Archy Moor – "Robbery Rings" (VFX Artists: Adam Todhunter, Vittoria Belli & Nicolas de Sola); Yamê – "Solo" (VFX Creative Directors: Colin Journée & Mathieu Jussreandot)
Best Animation in a Video
Mac Miller – "Balloonerism" (Animators: Jay Asava, Jin Jindawitchu, Alexandre Daumail, Alexandre Dumez, Simon Diebold, Nico Debon, Benoît de Geyer d'Orth, Kevin Ducrot, Chloé Fabre, Mikolaj Janiw, Steeve Manangou & Clément Pierre; Director: Samuel Jerome Mason); AJ Tracey – "3rd Time Lucky" (Animators: Dario Imbrogno & Supreme4stupid; Directors: Late Milk & Dario Imbrogno); Gonzalo Varela – "Amanecer" (Animator: Clara Rodríguez de Almeida; Director: Clara Rodríguez de Almeida); Nap Eyes – "Dark Mystery Enigma Bird" (Animator: Dr Cool; Director: Jordan Minkoff); The Avett Brothers – "Love of a Girl" (Animators: Victor Haegelin; Stop Motion Animation: Julien Jourdain de Muizon & Victor Haegelin; Character Designer/Illustration: Mateo Montoya; 2D Animation: Mathieu Maillefer; Puppets; Coralli Grieu, Thomas Gebcynski & Alexandra Malcouronne; Director: Victor Haegelin); Gunship – "Tech Noir 2" (Animator: Lee Hardcastle; Director: Lee Hardcastle)

== Special Video Categories ==
Best Live Video	Best Special Video Project
Fred again... & Obongjayar – "Adore U" (Director: Chapter Road); Jacob Collier & Aurora – "A Rock Somewhere" x "The Seed" (for Greenpeace) (Director: Fionn Guilfoyle); Adrianne Lenker – "Not a Lot, Just Forever" (Director: Jonas Bang); English Teacher – "Not Everybody Gets to Go tot Space" (Director: Slane); Yamê – "Solo" (Director: Jonathan Steuer); Amie Blu – "Swimming in Pity" (Director: Edoardo Cimatti)	Hannah Holland – Last Exit on Bethnal (Director: Lydia Garnett); Ariana Grande – Brighter Days Ahead (Director: Christian Breslauer); Kojey Radical – Don't Look Down (Director: Relta); Yamê – Ebem (Director: Thomas Bertrand); Maxo – Mars is Electric (Director: Vincent Haycock); John Grant – The Art of the Lie (Director: Erin Sullivan)

== Individual and Company Categories ==
Best Director	Best New Director
Gabriel Moses; Colin Solal Cardo; Damian Kulash Jr.; Jordan Hemingway; Vania & Muggia	Luna Carmoon; Alex Acy; Fa & Fon; India Rose Harris; Jake Erland; Melchior Leroux
Best Producer	Best Executive Producer
Chris Murdoch; Ayomide Alli; Biba Thomas; Ernest Bouvier; Jason Baum; Maggie Curwin	Morgan Clement; Alex Brinkman; Alice Wills; Dom McKiernan; Hugo Legrand Nathan; Nathan Scherrer
Best Production Company	Best Creative Commissioner
Object & Animal; Division; Freenjoy; Iconoclast; Prodco; Stink Films	Louis Danchwerts (Polydor); Jake Crossland (Partisan Records); John Moule; Kat Cattaneo (Sony Music); Kirstin Cruickshank; Michael Lewin (Sony Music)
Icon Award	Legend Award
Damian Kulash	Diane Martel
