= No Trespassing (ASAP Rocky song) =

2026 song by ASAP Rocky

Song by ASAP Rocky

from the album Don't Be Dumb
- Released: January 16, 2026
- Genre: Alternative hip-hop; hyphy
- Length: 3:15
- Label: AWGE; ASAP; RCA
- Songwriters: Rakim Mayers; Denzel Baptiste; David Biral; Will Grogan; Thibault Dominguez
- Producers: ASAP Rocky; Take a Daytrip; Grogs & Mingo

"No Trespassing" is a song by American rapper ASAP Rocky from his fourth studio album, Don't Be Dumb (2026). It was produced by Rocky himself, Take a Daytrip and Grogs & Mingo.

== Composition and lyrics ==
The production contains "palpitating" drums, along with a "whispery bass and reverberating backdrop"; the sound has been compared to Bay Area rap. ASAP Rocky subtly takes shots at rapper Drake, with a reference of him moving to Texas in 2024: "I might move to Texas, roll 'round with protection / Pull up to your section, hit 'em with that fire".

== Critical reception ==
The song received generally positive reviews. Angel Diaz of Billboard placed it at number 14 in a ranking of tracks from Don't Be Dumb. Alexander Cole of HotNewHipHop wrote of the song, "Once again, it sounds like Rocky is rapping as confidently as ever on this new album. The beats are off the wall, and one has to wonder if this is resonating with the masses right now. After all, we expected Rocky to take some risks since it's been a while since his last album. Whatever the case may be, we're having fun." Dimas Sanfiorenzo of Complex considered the run from "Playa" to "Stop Snitching" (which includes "No Trespassing") among the album's "best material". Clash's Robin Murray described the song as "sheer, filthy club music", while Consequence's Kiana Fitzgerald called it a "personalized course in Pretty Flacko 101." Paul A. Thompson of Pitchfork considered the song to have one of the best beats from the album. Paste's Casey Epstein-Gross regarded it as a standout track from the album, commenting it "moves with this greasy Bay-adjacent lilt, all low-end wobble and negative space".

== Charts ==
Chart performance for "No Trespassing"
Chart (2026)	Peak position
Canada Hot 100 (Billboard)	72
Global 200 (Billboard)	158
Latvia Streaming (LaIPA)	19
Lithuania (AGATA)	53
US Billboard Hot 100	65
US Hot R&B/Hip-Hop Songs (Billboard)	22
