= Don't Be Dumb =

2026 studio album by ASAP Rocky

- Standard cover art. Multiple variants are available for physical versions.

Studio album by ASAP Rocky
- Released: January 16, 2026
- Recorded: 2020–2025
- Genres: Experimental hip-hop; trap; psychedelic
- Length: 65:21
- Labels: ASAP; AWGE; RCA
- Producers: ASAP Rocky; BossMan Dlow; Brent Faiyaz; Cardo Got Wings; Clams Casino; Cristoforo Donadi; Damon Albarn; Digital Nas; Emile Haynie; Ging; Greg Kurstin; Grogs & Mingo; Hector Delgado; Hit-Boy; HitKidd; Icytwat; Jordan Patrick; Kelvin Krash; Leo RD; Loukeman; Manny Laurenko; Rance; Rex Kudo; Slay Squad; Soufien 3000; Take a Daytrip; Thundercat; T-Minus; will.i.am

ASAP Rocky chronology
Testing (2018)	Don't Be Dumb (2026)

Singles from Don't Be Dumb
- 1. "Punk Rocky" Released: January 5, 2026; 2. "Helicopter" Released: January 12, 2026; 3. "Stay Here 4 Life" Released: February 3, 2026

Don't Be Dumb is the fourth studio album by the American rapper ASAP Rocky. It was released on January 16, 2026, through AWGE / ASAP Worldwide and RCA Records. The album features a wide range of contributors, including guest appearances from BossMan Dlow, Brent Faiyaz, Gorillaz, Doechii, Jessica Pratt, Sauce Walka, Westside Gunn, and will.i.am; digital editions additionally feature Jozzy, Tokischa, Tyler, the Creator, and Imogen Heap.

Commercially, Don't Be Dumb topped the Billboard 200, becoming Rocky's first number-one debut in over a decade. It received generally positive critical reception. The album's cover art and promotional music video rollout was designed by American filmmaker Tim Burton.

== Background and promotion ==
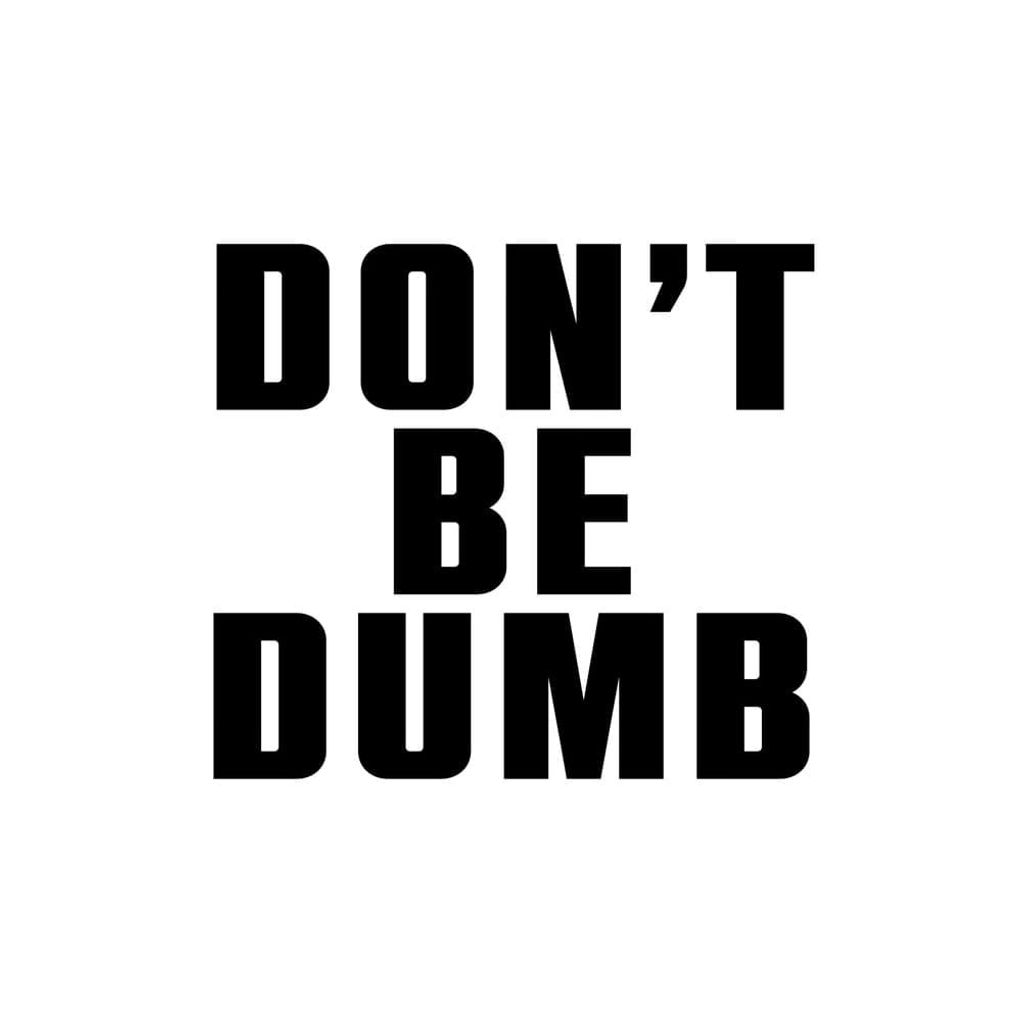
2024 pre-release album cover

On July 20, 2023, Rocky released the single "Riot (Rowdy Pipe'n)". On June 21, 2024, during Paris Fashion Week, Rocky previewed a song from the album, and announced its release for August 30 of that year. On August 2, 2024, Rocky revealed to Zane Lowe during an interview and conversation on Apple Music 1, amongst other topics, about an upcoming song titled "Hood Happy" featuring Fatman Scoop, Flavor Flav, Slick Rick, Morrissey and Busta Rhymes. On August 22, 2024, during an interview for a Billboard cover story, Rocky announced that the album had been delayed from August 30 to sometime during fall of 2024. He stated in a social media post that sample clearances and leaks had caused the delay. During 2024, Rocky would release the singles "Highjack", "Tailor Swif", and "Ruby Rosary" as intended singles for the album.

On March 2, 2025, Rocky announced that Don't Be Dumb was being mixed and mastered. As Rocky stated about the album:

"People are tired of hearing about updates about the album. They're just ready to get this shit, you know what I'm saying? I don't think anybody wants to hear where I'm at with it, how far is it along and all that. They just want to hear some shit just to see where I'm at, and I promise I got some new shit in store. I'm challenging myself. It's like anything, I approach it with a different tactic, degree, or finesse."

On July 4, 2025, Rocky released another single intended for the album, "Pray4DaGang" featuring KayCyy. The music video was removed from streaming platforms after around two days. Rocky previewed songs from the album in an October 2025 advertisement for his collaboration with clothing brand Puma. On December 16, 2025, Rocky revealed the album's cover art, designed by American filmmaker Tim Burton, and release date of January 16, 2026. He partnered with financial company Bilt to release a limited vinyl of the album. On January 2, 2026, Rocky previewed a teaser of the music video from the album's first single, titled "Punk Rocky". Directed by Rocky himself along with Folkert Verdoorn and Simon Becks, it stars American actress Winona Ryder, and was released on January 5. The album's second single, titled "Helicopter", was released on January 12, along with a music video directed by Dan Streit.

Shortly after the release of the album, through his YouTube account Rocky uploaded immersive 360 video projection visualizers to each track of the album, he appears in different characterizations performing, while viewers can interact and explore multiple viewpoints and elements from the visualizers. Rocky performed "Punk Rocky" and a medley of "Don't Be Dumb/Trip Baby" and "Helicopter", alongside Danny Elfman and Thundercat playing drums and bass, respectively, during Rocky's first performance and appeared in the background during his second, on Saturday Night Live as the musical guest of the show on January 17. The next day he live performed for Amazon Music's new series Songline, during Yams Day on January 18, the performance featured live orchestration from Danny Elfman and guest appearances by members of ASAP Mob, it aired live across Amazon Music, Prime Video and Twitch. On January 19, a music video for both "Whiskey" and "Air Force" was released, starring Tim Burton, who designed and illustrated the album cover. On January 19, Rocky appeared as a guest on The Tonight Show Starring Jimmy Fallon, and promoted the album. On January 21, he added "Flackito Jodye", featuring Tokischa and previously released single "I Smoked Away My Brain(I'm God x Demons Mashup), featuring Imogen Heap and Clams Casino, to the digital release of the album, releasing a music video for Flackito Jodye

On October 16, 2026, he released the single "Shroom Clouds" as a single for the album's deluxe edition. The deluxe edition features previously released singles including "Babushka Boi", "Sundress", "Grim Freestyle", "Highjack", and "Trunks".

=== Tour ===
Rocky embarked on the Don't Be Dumb Tour in support of the album. With 49 shows in North America and Europe, the tour began in Chicago on May 27, 2026 and will conlude in Perth on December 17.

== Critical reception ==
Professional ratings
Aggregate scores
Source	Rating
AnyDecentMusic?	6.8/10
Metacritic	71/100
Review scores
Source	Rating
AllMusic	4/5 stars
Beats Per Minute	77%
Clash	8/10
Consequence	B−
Exclaim!	7/10
The Guardian	3/5 stars
NME	4/5 stars
Paste	C
Pitchfork	6.8/10
Rolling Stone	3.5/5 stars

Don't Be Dumb received generally positive reviews from critics. At Metacritic, which assigns a normalized rating out of 100 to reviews from mainstream publications, the album received an average score of 71, based on 13 reviews, indicating "generally favorable" reviews. The review aggregator site AnyDecentMusic? compiled 12 reviews and gave the album an average of 6.8 out of 10, based on their assessment of the critical consensus.

Robin Murray of Clash gave a score of 8 out of 10 for the album and wrote, "Eight years away from the booth hasn’t blunted A$AP Rocky’s pen, while his star quality is undeniable. With rap sliding away from the Billboard charts, it’s crucial, headline-making releases like this that keep the sound prominent, while still sneaking in underground ideas – once more, A$AP Rocky is one of the best out there." The Guardian's Shaad D'Souza wrote that Don't Be Dumb is Rocky's "strongest album since his debut", while further stating that "fans dumbfounded by Testing can breathe easy". Variety's Peter A. Berry gave a positive review and wrote, "What we get is a 2026 version of Rocky who raps as sharply as ever while flaunting the curatorial abilities that helped make him a star in the first place. If Don't Be Dumb is another test, then this time, Rocky certainly passed it."

== Commercial performance ==
In the United States, Don't Be Dumb debuted at number one on the Billboard 200 with 123,000 equivalent album units earned in its first week, marking Rocky's third career chart-topper and his first No. 1 in over a decade. The set's streaming-equivalent units comprised a significant portion of its sales, driven by a strong performance across major platforms, including a record 35.4 million first-day streams on Spotify, the largest album streaming debut of 2026 to that point. The album also is currently the best selling rap album of 2026 on vinyl with over 140,000 units sold globally.

== Track listing ==
Don't Be Dumb track listing
No.	Title	Writer(s)	Producer(s)	Length
1.	"Order of Protection"	Rakim Mayers; Jordan Patrick; Larrance Dopson	ASAP Rocky; Patrick; Rance	2:51
2.	"Helicopter"	Mayers; Kelvin Magnusen; Soufien Rhouat	ASAP Rocky; Kelvin Krash; Soufien 3000	2:44
3.	"Interrogation (Skit)"	Mayers; Stephen Bruner; Dopson	ASAP Rocky; Thundercat; Rance	0:49
4.	"Stole Ya Flow"	Mayers; Brandon Banner; Magnusen; Danny Elfman	ASAP Rocky; Icytwat; Kelvin Krash; Rance	3:19
5.	"Stay Here 4 Life" (featuring Brent Faiyaz)	Mayers; Christopher Wood; Chauncey Hollis; Luke Fenton; Dopson; Bruner; Kenyatta Frazier Jr.; Clif Shayne	ASAP Rocky; Faiyaz; Hit-Boy; Loukeman; Rance; Thundercat^{[a]}	5:46
6.	"Playa"	Mayers; Ron LaTour; Bruner; Fenton; Troy Taylor; Edrick Miles; Tony E. Scales; Tremaine Neverson	ASAP Rocky; Cardo Got Wings; Thundercat; Loukeman^{[a]}	3:47
7.	"No Trespassing"	Mayers; Denzel Baptiste; David Biral; Will Grogan; Thibault Dominguez	ASAP Rocky; Take a Daytrip; Grogs & Mingo	3:15
8.	"Stop Snitching" (featuring BossMan Dlow and Sauce Walka)	Mayers; Anthony Holmes Jr.; Rex Kudo; Devante McCreary; Albert Mondane	ASAP Rocky; BossMan Dlow; Kudo; HitKidd	3:20
9.	"STFU" (featuring Slay Squad)	Mayers; Adam Feeney; Brahim Gousse; Keione Benson; Dopson; Lamar Edwards	ASAP Rocky; Slay Squad; Ging; Rance	2:58
10.	"Punk Rocky"	Mayers; Cristoforo Donadi; Zach Fogarty; Feeney	ASAP Rocky; Donadi; Fogarty^{[c]}; Ging^{[c]}	3:55
11.	"Air Force (Black DeMarco)"	Mayers; Nasir Pemberton; Greg Kurstin; Emmanuel Kouadio; Fogarty; Patrick	ASAP Rocky; Kurstin; Digital Nas; Manny Laurenko; Fogarty^{[c]}; Patrick^{[a]}	3:44
12.	"Whiskey (Release Me)" (featuring Gorillaz and Westside Gunn)	Mayers; Tyler Williams; Damon Albarn; Fogarty; Alvin Worthy	ASAP Rocky; Albarn; T-Minus; Fogarty^{[a]}	4:05
13.	"Robbery" (featuring Doechii)	Mayers; Jaylah Hickmon; Duke Ellington; Irving Mills; Juan Tizol	ASAP Rocky	3:55
14.	"Don't Be Dumb / Trip Baby"	Mayers; Fenton; Claire Cottrill; Rostam Batmanglij	ASAP Rocky; Loukeman^{[a]}	4:45
15.	"The End" (featuring will.i.am and Jessica Pratt)	Mayers; Fogarty; Emile Haynie; William Adams; Kudo	ASAP Rocky; will.i.am; Haynie; Fogarty^{[c]}; Patrick^{[a]}; Al Carlson^{[a]}; Matt McDermott^{[a]}	3:34
Total length:				52:49

Digital bonus songs (Disc 2)
No.	Title	Writer(s)	Producer(s)	Length
1.	"SWAT Team"	Mayers; Patrick; Magnusen; Baptiste; Biral	ASAP Rocky; Patrick; Take a Daytrip; Kelvin Krash	3:12
2.	"Fish n Steak (What It Is)" (featuring Tyler, the Creator and Jozzy)	Mayers; Tyler Okonma; Hector Delgado; Jocelyn Donald; Steve Thornton; Eliot Dubock	ASAP Rocky; Slim K; Delgado; Beat Butcha^{[c]}	3:49
3.	"Flackito Jodye" (featuring Tokischa)	Mayers; Tokischa Peralta; Leonardo Garcés; Patrick; Fogarty	ASAP Rocky; Leo RD; Patrick	2:20
4.	"I Smoked Away My Brain (I'm God × Demons Mashup)" (featuring Imogen Heap and Clams Casino)	Mayers; Heap; Billy Steinberg; Rick Nowels; Michael Volpe; Clair D'uabaldo	Clams Casino; Zanthin^{[a]}	3:10
Total length:				65:21

Notes

- ^{^[c]} indicates a co-producer.
- ^{^[a]} indicates an additional producer.
- "Helicopter" contains an interpolation of "Raise Up", written by Moses Barrett and Timothy Mosley, and performed by Petey Pablo.
- "Stay Here 4 Life" contains elements of "Full Moon (Fall in Tokyo)", written by Christopher Wood and performed by Brent Faiyaz, which itself contains a sample of "Mewtwo", written by Kenyatta Frazier Jr. and Clif Shayne and performed by Ken Carson.
- "Playa" contains a interpolation of "Is It You?", written and performed by Lee Ritenour, and a sample of "Love Faces", written by Tremaine Neverson, Troy Taylor, Edrick Miles and Tony Scales, and performed by Trey Songz.
- "Stop Snitching" contains a sample of "Give This Love a Try", written and performed by Leroy Hutson.
- "Air Force (Black DeMarco)" contains an uncredited sample of "Bahamas", written by Marcus Slade, Rakim Mayers, Darold Brown, Gerrell Nealy, Jamel Phillips, Toumani Diabate and Quincy Hanley and performed by ASAP Rocky, ASAP Ferg, ASAP Twelvyy, Lil Yachty, Key!, Schoolboy Q and Smooky Margielaa.
- "Robbery" contains a sample of "Caravan", written by Duke Ellington and Juan Tizol, as performed by Thelonious Monk.
- "Don't Be Dumb/Trip Baby" contains a sample of "Sinking", written by Claire Cottrill and Rostam Batmanglij and performed by Clairo.
- "The End" contains an uncredited sample of "Ebony Glass", written and performed by Nancy Priddy.

== Personnel ==
Credits adapted from Qobuz.

=== Additional vocalists ===
- Thundercat – vocals (track 6)
- Jon Batiste – vocals (track 13)
- Anycia – background vocals (track 6)
- Jordan Patrick – background vocals (tracks 10, 14), guitar (track 6), keyboards (track 6)
- Carlton McDowell – background vocals (track 11)
- Spencer Sutherland – background vocals (track 11)
- Westside Gunn – background vocals (track 12)
- Zsela – background vocals (track 14)
- Ashly Williams – choir (tracks 1, 4)
- Jaden Gray – choir (tracks 1, 4)
- Anthony McEastland – choir (tracks 1, 4)
- Nakia Mason – choir (tracks 1, 4)
- Alexandria Dopson – choir (tracks 1, 4)

=== Musicians ===
- Thundercat – bass (track 3, 6); guitar (track 9)
- Michael Prince – violin (track 7)
- Cristoforo Donadi – guitar (track 10)
- Zach Forgaty – guitar (track 10), recording (tracks 3, 8)
- Ging – bass, drums (track 10)

=== Technical ===
- Gosha Usov – recording (tracks 1, 4–6, 8)
- Matt Scatchell – recording (tracks 1, 7, 8, 13), mixing (track 8)
- Kelvin Krash – recording (tracks 2, 4)
- Josh Shubach – recording (tracks 3–5)
- Soufien Rhouat – recording (track 2)
- Noe Corona – recording (track 7), reconstruction (track 6)
- Dre Moon – reconstruction (track 2)
- Mike Dean – mixing (tracks 1–4, 6–8)
- Rob Kinelski – mixing (tracks 5, 10)
- Tatsuya Sato – mastering (tracks 1–6, 10)
- Ray Bergin – assistant mastering (all tracks)
- Danny Elfman – unspecified contribution (track 4)

== Charts ==
Chart performance for Don't Be Dumb
Chart (2026)	Peak position
Australian Albums (ARIA)	5
Australian Hip Hop/R&B Albums (ARIA)	1
Austrian Albums (Ö3 Austria)	4
Belgian Albums (Ultratop Flanders)	5
Belgian Albums (Ultratop Wallonia)	7
Canadian Albums (Billboard)	2
Croatian International Albums (HDU)	5
Czech Albums (ČNS IFPI)	3
Danish Albums (Hitlisten)	2
Dutch Albums (Album Top 100)	3
Finnish Albums (Suomen virallinen lista)	11
French Albums (SNEP)	14
German Albums (Offizielle Top 100)	7
German Hip-Hop Albums (Offizielle Top 100)	1
Hungarian Albums (MAHASZ)	1
Irish Albums (Official Charts)	8
Italian Albums (FIMI)	7
Japanese Dance & Soul Albums (Oricon)	10
Japanese Hot Albums (Billboard Japan)	89
Lithuanian Albums (AGATA)	1
New Zealand Albums (RMNZ)	4
Nigerian Albums (TurnTable)	96
Norwegian Albums (IFPI Norge)	3
Polish Albums (ZPAV)	3
Portuguese Albums (AFP)	2
Scottish Albums (Official Charts)	48
Slovak Albums (ČNS IFPI)	2
Spanish Albums (Promusicae)	22
Swedish Albums (Sverigetopplistan)	13
Swedish Hip Hop Albums (Sverigetopplistan)	1
Swiss Albums (Schweizer Hitparade)	1
UK Albums (Official Charts)	8
UK R&B Albums (Official Charts)	3
US Billboard 200	1
US Top R&B/Hip-Hop Albums (Billboard)	1

== Release history ==
Release dates and formats for Don't Be Dumb
Region	Date	Format(s)	Label	Ref.
Various	January 16, 2026	Cassette; CD; vinyl; digital download; streaming	RCA	
