= Stop Snitching (song) =

2026 song by ASAP Rocky featuring BossMan Dlow and Sauce Walka

Song by ASAP Rocky featuring BossMan Dlow and Sauce Walka

from the album Don't Be Dumb
- Released: January 16, 2026
- Genre: Southern hip-hop; trap
- Length: 3:20
- Label: AWGE; ASAP; RCA
- Songwriters: Rakim Mayers; Anthony Holmes Jr.; Rex Kudo; Devante McCreary; Albert Mondane
- Producers: ASAP Rocky; BossMan Dlow; Kudo; HitKidd

"Stop Snitching" is a song by American rapper ASAP Rocky from his fourth studio album, Don't Be Dumb (2026). It features American rappers BossMan Dlow and Sauce Walka. The song was produced by Rocky, Dlow, Rex Kudo and HitKidd. In the song, Rocky references his highly publicized trial and acquittal for allegedly shooting his friend A$AP Relli.

== Critical reception ==
The song received generally positive reviews. Angel Diaz of Billboard ranked it as the best song from Don't Be Dumb. Likewise, Dimas Sanfiorenzo of Complex considered the run from "Playa" to "Stop Snitching" among the album's "best material". Alexander Cole of HotNewHipHop wrote of the song, "One of those fun songs is the track 'Stop Snitching,' which features the likes of Sauce Walka. Overall, it is a unique song, especially when you consider what Sauce Walka typically raps on. Having said that, there is some solid rapping here, and we're fans of the song so far." Paste's Casey Epstein-Gross and Variety's Peter A. Berry both regarded the song's diss to be entertaining; Berry stated "Rocky distills what sounds like years' worth of bitterness toward cooperators who made rapper RICO charges possible." Music critics also praised Sauce Walka's performance; Pitchfork's Paul A. Thompson commented "The flaccidity of 'Stole Ya Flow' is mitigated somewhat by Rocky's inclusion of a truly show-stopping verse from Sauce Walka on 'Stop Snitching'". In an album review, Kyann-Sian Williams of NME wrote "Elsewhere, Rocky occasionally gets eclipsed. Sauce Walka walks him down on 'Stop Snitching', seizing the beat's blaring horns with Southern twang and precision."

== Charts ==
Chart performance for "Stop Snitching"
Chart (2026)	Peak position
Canada Hot 100 (Billboard)	91
Global 200 (Billboard)	172
Lithuania (AGATA)	64
US Billboard Hot 100	62
US Hot R&B/Hip-Hop Songs (Billboard)	20
