= Helicopter (ASAP Rocky song) =

2026 single by ASAP Rocky

Single by ASAP Rocky

from the album Don't Be Dumb
- Released: January 12, 2026
- Recorded: 2024
- Genre: Trap
- Length: 2:45
- Label: AWGE; A$AP Worldwide; RCA
- Songwriters: Rakim Mayers; Kelvin Magnusen; Soufien Rhouat
- Producers: ASAP Rocky; Kelvin Krash; Soufien 3000

ASAP Rocky singles chronology
"Punk Rocky" (2026)	"Helicopter" (2026)	"Stay Here 4 Life" (2026)

Music video
- "Helicopter" Video on YouTube

"Helicopter" (stylized in physical copies as "Helicopter$") is a song by American rapper ASAP Rocky, released on January 12, 2026 as the second single for his fourth studio album, Don't Be Dumb. The song was written and produced by Rocky himself, along with Kelvin Krash and Soufien 3000.

== Promotion and release ==
On January 10, 2026, Rocky released the cover art for the single on his social media pages. He captioned it:

"DUMBEST VIDEO OF THE FUCCIN YEAR 🔥🔥🔥!!! PLAY DUMB GAMES , WIN DUMB PRIZES!!! HELICOPTER THIS MONDAY 🔥!!!".

The cover art for the single is heavily inspired by PS1-era Grand Theft Auto games, specifically Grand Theft Auto (which the "3D ASAP ROCKY" logo is based on the logo of), and Grand Theft Auto 2 (which the "Helicopter 2" logo is based on the logo of).

Initially, Playboi Carti was supposed to be featured on the song, as he appeared on a version that was leaked online on late 2025.

== Live performances ==
Rocky performed "Punk Rocky" and a medley of "Don't Be Dumb/Trip Baby" and "Helicopter", alongside Danny Elfman and Thundercat playing drums and bass, respectively, during Rocky's first performance and appeared in the background during his second, on Saturday Night Live as the musical guest of the show on January 17.

== Music video ==
The song was released on January 12, simultaneously with a music video directed by Dan Streit.

== Personnel ==
Credits adapted from Apple Music.

- Kelvin Krash – recording
- Soufien Rhouat – recording
- Mike Dean – mixing
- Tatsuya Sato – mastering
- Ray Bergin – assistant mastering
- Dre Moon – reconstruction

== Charts ==
Chart performance for "Helicopter"
Chart (2026)	Peak position
Australia (ARIA)	54
Australia Hip Hop/R&B (ARIA)	8
Austria (Ö3 Austria Top 40)	40
Canada Hot 100 (Billboard)	31
Costa Rica Anglo Airplay (Monitor Latino)	13
Czech Republic Singles Digital (ČNS IFPI)	37
France (SNEP)	196
Germany (GfK)	67
Greece International (IFPI)	6
Global 200 (Billboard)	26
Iceland (Billboard)	20
Ireland (IRMA)	46
Latvia Streaming (LaIPA)	1
Lithuania (AGATA)	7
Netherlands (Single Top 100)	86
New Zealand Hot Singles (RMNZ)	4
Norway (IFPI Norge)	49
Poland (Polish Streaming Top 100)	30
Portugal (AFP)	64
Romania (Billboard)	7
Slovakia Singles Digital (ČNS IFPI)	32
South Africa Streaming (TOSAC)	72
Sweden Heatseeker (Sverigetopplistan)	11
Switzerland (Schweizer Hitparade)	24
UK Singles (Official Charts)	42
UK Hip Hop/R&B (Official Charts)	12
US Billboard Hot 100	24
US Hot R&B/Hip-Hop Songs (Billboard)	8
