= Shittin' Me =

Single by ASAP Rocky
- Released: December 2, 2022
- Genre: Hip hop
- Length: 2:24
- Label: ASAP Worldwide; RCA; Polo Grounds
- Songwriters: Rakim Mayers; Kelvin Magnusen
- Producer: Kelvin Krash

"Shittin' Me" is a song by American rapper ASAP Rocky. It was released through ASAP Worldwide, RCA Records and Polo Grounds Music on December 2, 2022.

== Music video ==
The video was released December 5, 2022, on YouTube. It was directed by Grin Machine and was inspired by the mosh pit meme and was produced by Kelvin Krash. The song and video also reference the 2022 racing video game, Need for Speed Unbound where the song is used in addition to a custom Mercedes-Benz 190E. Tyler, the Creator created a cake using a scene from the video days later. “It has been a pleasure getting to be a creative collaborator with EA on the new Need for Speed game" Rocky mentioned in an interview.

=== Synopsis ===
The video begins at a party where Rocky is attending until he goes outside and is buried in a stampede of fans. Three men find his lifeless body in an empty room and decide to live out his career by controlling his body like a marionette and even make a music video with it. The men grow tired of controlling his body so a computer prints a robot version of him which continues the rest.
