= Stole Ya Flow =

2026 song by ASAP Rocky

Song by ASAP Rocky

from the album Don't Be Dumb
- Released: January 16, 2026
- Genre: Hardcore hip-hop; rage; trap
- Length: 3:19
- Label: AWGE; ASAP; RCA
- Songwriters: Rakim Mayers; Brandon Banner; Kelvin Magnusen; Danny Elfman
- Producers: ASAP Rocky; Icytwat; Kelvin Krash; Rance

"Stole Ya Flow" is a song by American rapper ASAP Rocky, released on January 16, 2026 from his fourth studio album, Don't Be Dumb. It was produced by Rocky himself, Icytwat of Divine Council, Kelvin Krash and Rance of 1500 or Nothin'. The song is a diss track aimed at Canadian rapper Drake and American rapper Travis Scott.

== Background ==
In an interview on The New York Times podcast Popcast, ASAP Rocky implied the song was about Drake without explicitly mentioning him. Regarding the origins of their feud, he said "I don't know, I just started just seeing people who started out as friends become foes. Seemed like they was unhappy for you and started sending shots. I think that's what led to any of our misunderstandings or whatever the case is. It really ain't smoke."

ASAP Rocky and Drake were previously friends since 2011, the year the former gained notoriety in music. They only collaborated once on "Fuckin' Problems" alongside Kendrick Lamar and 2 Chainz, which was released in 2012. Over time, their partnership deteriorated when in 2019, Rocky began dating singer, actress and fashion entrepreneur Rihanna, Drake's on-and-off ex-girlfriend from 2009 to 2016. This led to subliminal disses toward one another from 2021 up until 2024, when Drake had dissed Rocky among others on his song "Family Matters" amid his feud with Lamar.

Rocky debuted the song during his performance on the final day of Rolling Loud Miami in 2023.

== Composition and lyrics ==
The song consists of synthesizers and a "swelling, growling bass" with echoed ad-libs. Stylistically, it has been described as "dystopian Memphis street rap" and compared to Death Grips' music as regards the beat. ASAP Rocky raps in the chorus, "First you stole my flow, so I stole yo' bitch", referring to Rihanna. Some have also interpreted it as a diss toward rapper Travis Scott, who had reportedly briefly dated Rihanna in the 2010s. Rocky further criticizes Drake for showing a lack of authenticity in cultural identity and lyrics, his parenting skills, and being sensitive to disses, and references the rumor that he received plastic surgery. In addition, Rocky boasts his luxury and influence ("Black onyx, black diamonds shining, black jеans on / All-black chrome, black whip, black iPhone / Black hoodie, Black boy don't dance, mostly gangsta boogie") and mentions having children with Rihanna to reinforce his dominance over Drake.

== Critical reception ==
The song received generally positive reviews. Angel Diaz of Billboard ranked it as the third best song from Don't Be Dumb. Alexander Cole of HotNewHipHop commented "ICYTWAT and Kelvin Krash absolutely cook on the production here. Meanwhile, Rocky sounds fantastic, and this is some of the most confident rapping of his career so far." Complex's Antonio Johri stated "These jabs are obvious and humorous, preventing the diss from feeling overly serious." Shaad D'Souza of The Guardian commented "As ever, Rocky's charisma knows no bounds. Stole Ya Flow is ostensibly a Drake diss track, but it succeeds because Rocky sounds like he's having so much fun: 'N***** gettin' BBLs / Lucky we don't body shame,' he raps, relishing in the line's petty faux-altruism." Tom Breihan of Stereogum called it a "corroded monster of a track that shows Rocky at his imperious best. It's one of many times where he fumes about all the people who don't give him proper credit for setting trends. That anger brings something out of Rocky." Paste's Casey Epstein-Gross cited the song as one of the "valid or at least entertaining" disses from the album and called it a "synth-smeared war march that lets him lean into petty villain mode (eat shit, Drake)". With respect to the line "My baby mama Rihanna, so we unbothered", he commented it "would be the perfect mic-drop—if he didn't keep picking the mic back up to insist on it." Adam Brocklesby of Deeds Magazine considered it the strongest song on the album, "with Rocky laser-focused and rapping at his highest level with a tight flow and dynamic delivery." He went on to remark, "The lyrics are tongue-in-cheek, which following the success of Kendrick Lamar's 'Not Like Us' seems like the best way to insult Drake. With his effortless delivery and dense production, the song does also do well to stand separate from the beef and taking the drama out of it would still hold musical merit."

Some critics viewed the song as uninteresting or overshadowed by other diss tracks directed at Drake. Pitchfork's Paul A. Thompson described it as "somehow emptier than Drake's non-insults (You're beautiful, I love your wife) from nearly two years ago. (The flaccidity of 'Stole Ya Flow' is mitigated somewhat by Rocky's inclusion of a truly show-stopping verse from Sauce Walka on 'Stop Snitching,' author of one of the most scathing Drake disses ever.)" Alex Hudson of Exclaim! called it "tame", with "forgettable jabs about BBLs failing to register compared to Drizzy's more famous feuds." Michael G. Barilleaux of RapReviews opined that the line "First you stole my flow, so I stole your bitch" was "nap-inducing", adding "As far as I'm concerned, Kendrick buried Drake far deeper in the dirt than anyone else ever could or will need to."

== Aftermath ==
On May 15, 2026, Drake released his studio album, Iceman, which includes a track, "Burning Bridges", a response to "Stole Ya Flow", where he calls out both ASAP Rocky and Rihanna.

== Charts ==
Chart performance for "Stole Ya Flow"
Chart (2026)	Peak position
Canada Hot 100 (Billboard)	40
Czech Republic Singles Digital (ČNS IFPI)	72
Global 200 (Billboard)	50
Greece International (IFPI)	9
Latvia Streaming (LaIPA)	3
Lithuania (AGATA)	18
New Zealand Hot Singles (RMNZ)	3
Poland (Polish Streaming Top 100)	37
Portugal (AFP)	84
Slovakia Singles Digital (ČNS IFPI)	38
South Africa Streaming (TOSAC)	96
UK Singles (OCC)	59
US Billboard Hot 100	33
US Hot R&B/Hip-Hop Songs (Billboard)	11
