= Sundress (song) =

Single by ASAP Rocky

from the album Don't Be Dumb (Disc 2)
- Released: November 20, 2018
- Recorded: 2014
- Genre: Psychedelic; pop rap; psychedelic rock
- Length: 2:38
- Label: RCA
- Songwriters: Hector Delgado; Rakim Mayers; Brian Burton; Joshua Scriggs
- Producers: Hector Delgado; Lord Flacko; Danger Mouse; Syk Sense

ASAP Rocky singles chronology
"Fukk Sleep" (2018)	"Sundress" (2018)	"Runnin" (2019)

Music video
- "Sundress" on YouTube

"Sundress" is a song by American rapper ASAP Rocky, released as a single on November 20, 2018. It was co-produced by Danger Mouse, and samples the 2010 Tame Impala song "Why Won't You Make Up Your Mind?" Its accompanying music video was released the same day.

== Composition ==
"Sundress" is an upbeat pop song with elements of disco and rock that samples the psychedelic rock track "Why Won't You Make Up Your Mind?" by Australian artist Tame Impala, from his 2010 album Innerspeaker. ASAP Rocky "swings easily between a sing-song croon and swift bars about nursing old feelings after a break-up" on the track, which was said to take the "original's fervently pulsing chillout session [...] up a few notches until it's a party track".

== Music video ==
The music video was directed by Frank Lebon and features artist and model Kesewa Aboah. In the video, Aboah is walking down a street with her partner and notices a man walking across the street who mysteriously turns into Rocky. She and her partner then follow Rocky into a club where she shoots him in the head, thus creating an explosion of shared memories of the two together. In the end, time reverses and she returns to her partner, who is revealed to be Rocky. The music video was called "trippy" by Billboard, "enthralling" by Rolling Stone, and "surreal" by Oyster. It was compared to the Mannequin Challenge by Uproxx. Colin Hodgson, in an analysis, compared it to the 1962 French short film La Jetée, which features still image photography.

== Critical reception ==
Along with the reception for the video, critics also commented on the song, with The Fader calling it "vibrantly-produced", noting ASAP Rocky's switch from singing to rapping.

== Charts ==
Chart performance for "Sundress"
Chart (2018–2024)	Peak position
Belgium (Ultratip Bubbling Under Flanders)	2
Belgium (Ultratip Bubbling Under Wallonia)	22
Canada Hot 100 (Billboard)	72
Estonia (Eesti Ekspress)	35
Ireland (IRMA)	97
Latvia (LAIPA)	12
Lithuania (AGATA)	44
New Zealand Hot Singles (RMNZ)	4
Sweden Heatseeker (Sverigetopplistan)	10
US Bubbling Under Hot 100 (Billboard)	3

== Certifications ==
Certifications for "Sundress"
Region	Certification	Certified units/sales
Australia (ARIA)	Gold	35,000^{‡}
Denmark (IFPI Danmark)	Platinum	90,000^{‡}
France (SNEP)	Platinum	200,000^{‡}
Italy (FIMI)	Gold	50,000^{‡}
New Zealand (RMNZ)	3× Platinum	90,000^{‡}
Poland (ZPAV)	Platinum	50,000^{‡}
Portugal (AFP)	Gold	5,000^{‡}
United Kingdom (BPI)	Platinum	600,000^{‡}
United States (RIAA)	Platinum	1,000,000^{‡}
^{‡} Sales+streaming figures based on certification alone.
