= Highjack =

2024 single by ASAP Rocky featuring Jessica Pratt

Single by ASAP Rocky featuring Jessica Pratt

from the album Don't Be Dumb (intended)
- Released: August 2, 2024
- Genre: Hip-hop
- Length: 3:10
- Label: AWGE; A$AP Worldwide; RCA
- Songwriters: Rakim Mayers; Jessica Pratt; Greg Kurstin; Carlton McDowell; Anthony Holmes, Jr.; Masamune Kudo; Robert Gallardo; Zach Fogarty; Jordan Patrick; Jon Batiste
- Producers: Kurstin; Patrick; Fogarty; Hitkidd; Car!ton

ASAP Rocky singles chronology
"Hoodlumz" (2024)	"Highjack" (2024)	"Tailor Swif" (2024)

Jessica Pratt singles chronology
"The Last Year" (2024)	"Highjack" (2024)

Music video
- "Highjack" on YouTube

"Highjack" (stylized in all caps) is a song by American rapper ASAP Rocky, released on August 2, 2024. The song was intended as the lead single from his upcoming fourth studio album, Don't Be Dumb; however, the song was not included on the album. Produced by Greg Kurstin, Jordan Patrick, Zach Fogarty, Hitkidd, and Car!ton, it features American musician Jessica Pratt. The song's background vocals are provided by Creed B Good and Jon Batiste, who sing during Pratt's performance.

== Background ==
In an interview with Zane Lowe on Apple Music 1, ASAP Rocky spoke about his inspirations behind the song and collaborations:

I just love alternative. I love just different sounds and whatnot. [Jessica Pratt] kind of gave me this kind of Portishead meets Stevie Nicks vibe a little bit. Right. So I always fucked with her as a artist, and so I figured it was necessary to get her, Jon Batiste on this one, and kind of make it feel soulful to bring it on home in the outro.

With respect to the theme of the song, Rocky said:

I feel like the real is back man, and it's just like, this shit is for the taking. It's a hijack. Not only that, it's just we coming with a whole new aesthetic on everything, especially with German expressionism and the whole ghetto futurism grim thing. So that's just what the sound sounds like and whatnot. The sonics of it.

== Composition and lyrics ==
The production is composed of "floaty keyboards" with "tight, snappy drums" and has been described as "sunny, spectral boom bap". The song has been noted to be reminiscent of the music from ASAP Rocky's early career, with a "fusion of melodic raps and dynamic sonic backdrop". Lyrically, Rocky addresses recent events of his life and successes. He repeatedly uses the phrase "like that", a reference to the song of the same name by Future, Metro Boomin and Kendrick Lamar, which has led to speculation that the song is dissing fellow rapper Drake. The theory is further supported by the lyrics, "Don't compare that pussy boy to me (I don't like that) / Feelin' like I'm Sosa, Chiefie Keef (I don't like that) / Tired of them niggas sleepin' on me, I don't like naps / Niggas fuck around and stole the flow and y'all like that?" Later on, Rocky raps about his influence in the rap industry, referencing his song "Peso", fashion designer Raf Simons and ASAP Mob's song "Raf". He ends his verse with mentions of pressures in his life, including people lusting after his wife Rihanna and his legal issues, following which Jessica Pratt sings from his point of view.

== Critical reception ==
Elias Andrews of HotNewHipHop wrote that Jessica Pratt "wisely plays to her strengths on the 'HIGHJACK' chorus. It's subtle yet catchy. ASAP Rocky does most of the heavy lifting here, and he proves up to the task."

== Charts ==
Chart performance for "Highjack"
Chart (2024)	Peak position
New Zealand Hot Singles (RMNZ)	6
US Billboard Hot 100	89
US Hot R&B/Hip-Hop Songs (Billboard)	26
US Rhythmic Airplay (Billboard)	13

Chart performance for "Highjack (Right Back)"
Chart (2025)	Peak position
New Zealand Hot Singles (RMNZ)	21

== Release history ==
Release dates and formats for "Highjack"
Region	Date	Format(s)	Label(s)	Ref.
United States	August 30, 2024	Rhythmic crossover	RCA	
