= We're Good =

2021 single by Dua Lipa

Single by Dua Lipa

from the album Future Nostalgia: The Moonlight Edition
- Released: 11 February 2021
- Studio: TaP (London); Sly (Copenhagen); Westlake (Los Angeles)
- Genre: Tropical pop
- Length: 2:45
- Label: Warner
- Songwriters: Dua Lipa; Sylvester Willy Sivertsen; Emily Warren; Scott Harris
- Producer: Sly

Dua Lipa singles chronology
"Real Groove" (Studio 2054 remix) (2020)	"We're Good" (2021)	"Love Again" (2021)

Music video
- "We're Good" on YouTube

"We're Good" is a song by English singer Dua Lipa from Future Nostalgia: The Moonlight Edition (2021), the deluxe reissue of her second studio album Future Nostalgia (2020). The song was written by Lipa alongside Emily Warren, Scott Harris and Sly, with the latter of the three handling the production. It was released for digital download and streaming on 11 February 2021 as the lead single from the reissue, simultaneously with the reissue's release. "We're Good" is a bossa nova and 2000s-styled, midtempo tropical pop song with trap and reggae rock elements. It sees the singer fantasising about an amicable breakup with a former boyfriend.

Several critics complimented the sound and Lipa's vocal performance on "We're Good", while some found it interesting to see Lipa depart the sound of Future Nostalgia. However, some thought the sound did not fit Lipa. Commercially, the song reached number 21 on the Billboard Global 200. It also reached number 25 on the UK Singles Chart while charting within the top 40 of charts in 21 other countries, including a number 31 peak on the US Billboard Hot 100 and a number four peak in Croatia. The song was awarded platinum certifications in Canada, Italy, Poland, Spain and New Zealand.

The music video for "We're Good" was directed by Vania Heymann and Gal Muggia and filmed in New York City. Set on a ship similar to the Titanic and filmed from a lobster's point of view, it sees Lipa performing in a restaurant on the ship as the lobster watches his friends being taken out of their tank to eventually be cooked and served as dinner to the upper-class passengers Lipa performs for. Several critics complimented the video's fashion, which is taken from The Great Gatsby (2013), as well as the surreality of it. The song was further promoted with a remix by Dillon Francis and a performance by Lipa on BBC Radio 1's Live Lounge.

== Background and composition ==
"We're Good"
A midtempo tropical-pop song set to a trap beat, "We're Good" features laid-back instrumentals and departs the sound of Lipa's Future Nostalgia album. In the song, Lipa sings about an amicable breakup and uses the metaphor of "sleeping and cocaine" to represent the incompatibility of two individuals.

"We're Good" was written by Dua Lipa alongside Emily Warren, Scott Harris and its producer Sly. It was written towards the end of the sessions for Future Nostalgia. Lipa decided to leave the song off the record as she thought that all the songs needed to fit the "future" and "nostalgic" themes. She also thought that although it fit into the pop sensibilities of the Future Nostalgia material, it was not ready to be heard. Additionally, the song was unfinished at the time of the album's release and Lipa was still working on it. The singer also realized that she needed to save some music for the album's deluxe reissue. Lipa took a leap of faith with the production but thought that it perfectly fits the song's meaning. "We're Good" was recorded at Sly Studio in Copenhagen and Westlake Studios in Los Angeles with the vocals being recorded at TaP Studio in London. Josh Gudwin mixed the song at Henson Studios in Hollywood while Chris Gehringer mastered it at Sterling Sound in Edgewater, New Jersey.

Musically, "We're Good" is a midtempo tropical-pop song. The song was noted for being a departure from the disco-orientated music of Future Nostalgia, incorporating elements of trap and reggae rock while using stylizations from bossa nova and early 2000s music. The song has a length of 2:45 and is constructed in verse–chorus form. It is composed in the time signature of 4/4 time in the key of G♯ Dorian, with a tempo of 134 beats per minute. The song follows a chord progression of G♯m–C♯ in the verses while additional F♯ and B chords are added in the bridges; the chorus follows a B–C♯–F♯–G♯m sequence (sheet music originally published in the key of E minor). The song uses a tropical trap production that features strummed parts, laid-back, midtempo instrumentals, a gentle groove, and a rolling trap beat.

Lipa uses seductive vocals that range from G♯_{3} to B_{4} and makes use of belts and cracks. Lyrically, "We're Good" is a breakup anthem where Lipa sings about an amicable split from a former boyfriend. She fantasises about this way to end a relationship, and showcases a theme of one freeing themselves from being trapped in a relationship that is not meant to be. She sings mainly about one's solo recovery from a relationship that has run its course, showing the savage side of a breakup and a cold hearted attitude to moving on. She mentions how in this sort of breakup, the two parties would not get mad when the other moves on. The singer explained that she thought that this type of this split gets lost in translation a lot of the time and when things are ego-driven, it's over. The opening line "I'm on an island" was speculated to be a response to the backlash she faced while vacationing during the COVID-19 pandemic. The song also includes a metaphor of "sleeping and cocaine" to show the incompatibility of a relationship.

The whole story behind the song is an amicable breakup. I think a lot of people wish and hope for those, especially because they can be such a difficult process to go through that at some point, you just hope that it's a very easy break and you can both just move on with your life.

— Lipa on the meaning behind "We're Good", Released

== Release and promotion ==
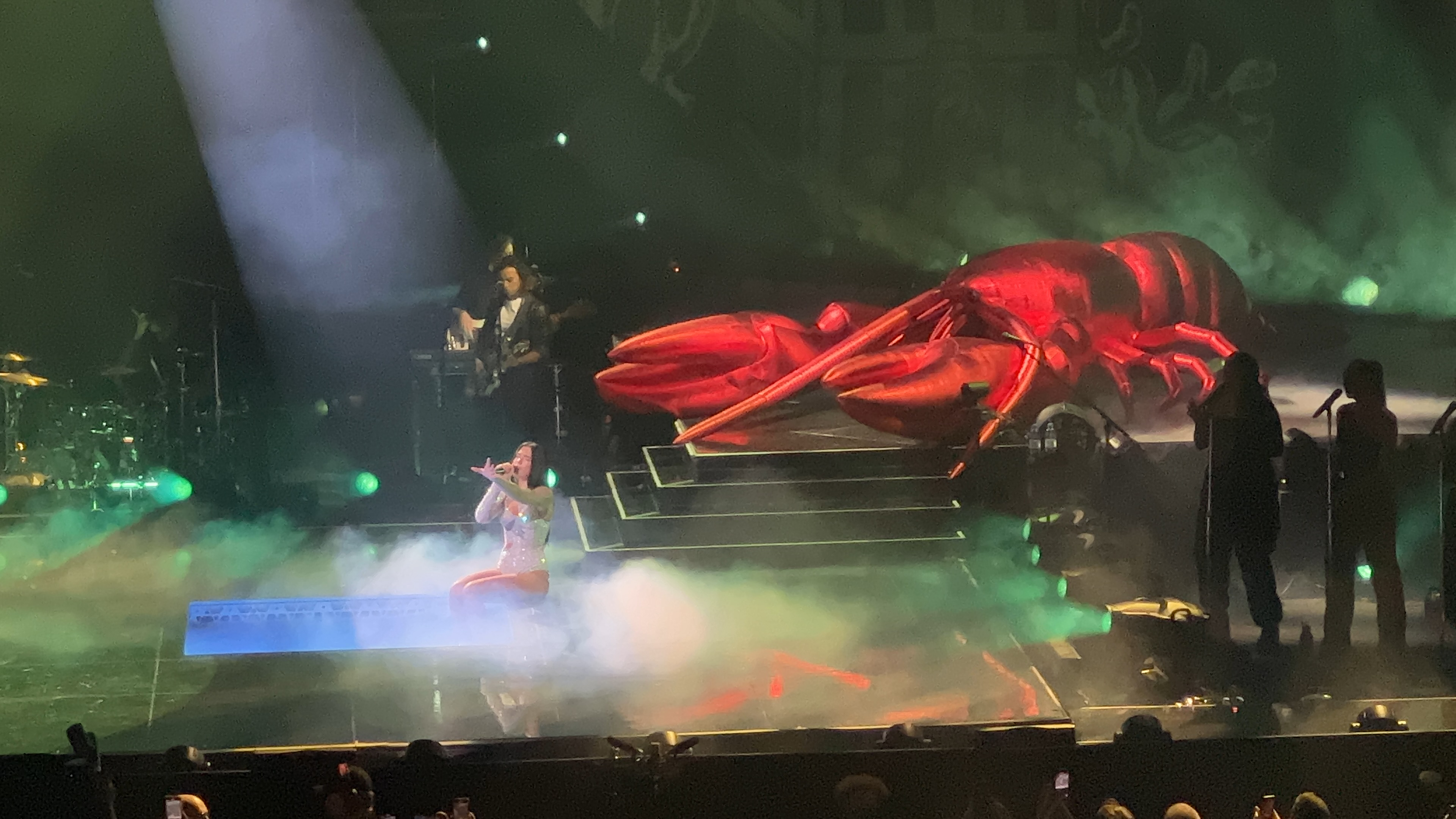
Lipa performing "We're Good" on the Future Nostalgia Tour in 2022

Following the March 2020 release of Future Nostalgia, Lipa revealed that a deluxe reissue of the album would be released, later announcing its 2021 release date. In November 2020, she revealed that its lead single would be released in early 2021 and began teasing its release that year. On 3 February 2021, Lipa formally announced the song title and release date as well as revealing the cover art. "We're Good" was released for digital download and streaming through Warner Records on 11 February 2021 and was simultaneously released as the thirteenth track on Future Nostalgia: The Moonlight Edition, the album's deluxe reissue. Lipa admitted that she was nervous about releasing the song as it was sonically very risky and an uncategorized genre, however, she thought the content was what made the song really interesting.

On 12 February 2021, the song was released for radio airplay in Italy. In the United States, the song was serviced to contemporary hit radio formats on 16 February as well as adult contemporary radio formats on 1 March 2021. On 12 March 2021, a remix of "We're Good" by Dillon Francis was released alongside its radio edit and extended version. It is a synth-led deep house song with rhythmic elements. Set to a tech house beat, it features uplifting piano rhythms and Lipa's vocals chopped, while the DJ builds up the production layer by layer before dropping it into a gritty arrangement. Lipa performed "We're Good" for the first time on BBC Radio 1's Live Lounge on 19 April 2021. The song was included on the setlist of Lipa's 2022 Future Nostalgia Tour.

== Critical reception ==
Jason Lipshutz of Billboard said "We're Good" takes a little while to "fully detonate", but praised Lipa's performance, pointing out how she "tackles every lyric with such passion and precision". The staff of the same magazine viewed the song as "sultry" while Chris Murphy of Vulture thought that the opening line was a "bold" choice. Robin Murray of Clash viewed the song as "a bubbling piece of future-facing pop" that shows the singer "in her element", while also stating that the opening line is "a little provocative". In The Wall Street Journal, Natalia Barr hypothesized that the laid-back instrumentals implied that an amicable breakup is "as dreamy as a seaside vacation". For The New York Times, Lindsay Zoladz thought that the song sees Lipa at her "cheekiest" and that it is "pretty straightforward and fun". She went on to describe the song as "buoyant" and "a sassy, slinky kiss-off". In The Guardian, Mark Beaumont named the song a "sumptuous slice of pop tropicália" while theorizing that Lipa rejected several metaphors she could have used in the lyrics.

For Paper, Shaad D'Souza theorised that Lipa took inspiration from her 2020 collaboration with Miley Cyrus, "Prisoner", for "We're Good" with the "vintage, rock-inflected pop" sound. He additionally praised it for being "simmering and brilliant, constantly switching gears until its end". Stereogum's Chris DeVille thought the song was "interesting" to see Lipa depart the disco sound of Future Nostalgia, but compared the song's sound to that of "Rude" (2013) by Magic!. Audacy's Maia Kedem compared the song's chorus to the works of No Doubt. Notion's staff saw it as an "earworm single". The staff of DIY viewed the song as a "sizzling" song and editor Emma Swann dubbed it "undeniably a bop of the highest order, a gut-punch of pure pop". Hal Kitchen of 25YearsLaterSite thought it is Lipa's "first dud single", blaming the "tacky, shrink-wrapped island vibe" as well as the "incredibly stiff and cheap-sounding production". However, he praised Lipa's vocal performance as well as the songwriting.

For Uproxx, Derrick Rossignol perceived that although "We're Good" moved away from its parent album's sound, it is "just as fun". Caitlin White of the same website said that the song "builds on everything she established" on Future Nostalgia and noted that it takes the album into "groovier realms". The staff of The Singles Jukebox gave the song a 4.31 score. Many thought that the song's midtempo sound was did not fit Lipa compared to her previous releases, while also commenting that the sleeping and cocaine metaphor did not make sense. Additionally, they drew comparisons from the song to "Doin' Time" (2019) by Lana Del Rey, the works of the Magnetic Fields, "Thank U, Next" (2018) by Ariana Grande and "Harleys in Hawaii" (2019) by Katy Perry. Some also thought that "If It Ain't Me" and "That Kind of Woman" would have made better singles for Future Nostalgia: The Moonlight Edition. "We're Good" was a Most Performed Song winner at the 2022 BMI Pop Awards. Tidal ranked it as the third best pop song of 2021.

== Commercial performance ==
"We're Good" debuted and peaked at number 21 on the Billboard Global 200 chart and reached number 16 on Billboard's Euro Digital Song Sales chart. In February 2021, the song debuted at its peak of number 25 on the UK Singles Chart, with first-week sales of 13,763 units. It spent 14 weeks on the chart. In February 2024, the song was awarded a gold certification from the British Phonographic Industry (BPI) for sales of 400,000 track-equivalent units in the United Kingdom. Elsewhere in Europe, the song reached the top 40 of charts in Austria, Belgium (Flanders and Wallonia), Croatia, Greece, Hungary, Iceland, Ireland, Lithuania, the Netherlands, Norway, Portugal, Romania, Slovakia, Sweden and Switzerland. In Italy, the song reached number 66 and was certified platinum by the Federazione Industria Musicale Italiana (FIMI) for selling 100,000 track-equivalent units in the country.

On Australia's ARIA Singles Chart, "We're Good" debuted at number 27 on the chart dated 28 February 2021, before reaching a peak of number 24 the following week. The song spent 17 weeks on the chart, and was awarded a gold certification from the Australian Recording Industry Association (ARIA) for selling 35,000 track-equivalent units in Australia. In New Zealand, the song spent 12 weeks on their Top 40 singles chart. It reached a peak of number 24 on the chart six weeks after it debuted at number 35. Recorded Music NZ (RMNZ) awarded the song a platinum certification for sales of 30,000 track-equivalent units in New Zealand.

On the US Billboard Hot 100, "We're Good" debuted at number 49 in February 2021. In its thirteenth week on the chart, the song reached a peak of 31. It spent a total of 18 non-consecutive weeks on the chart. In June 2021, the song was awarded a gold certification from the Recording Industry Association of America (RIAA) for track-equivalent sales of 500,000 units in the United States. In Canada, the song debuted at number 38 on the Canadian Singles Chart, before rising to a peak of number 21 in its eleventh week on the chart. The song reached the summit of the Mexico Airplay chart.

== Music video ==
=== Production and release ===
The music video for "We're Good" was directed by Israeli directing duo, Vania Heymann and Gal Muggia. As the song is quite different from other tracks on Future Nostalgia, Lipa wanted to get the album's modern and nostalgic themes into the video, whether that was with the video itself, the fashion or some other aspect. Heymann and Muggia came to Lipa with the video's treatment. Lipa found the concept of a love story between lobsters interesting. She was also unaware that lobsters could convey that much emotion. Lipa thought it would be cool to counteract the song's breakup themes with a love story video. The video was filmed in New York City in December 2020. Custom built sets and green screens were used for filming. The parts where the boat floods were filmed using smaller replicas of the sets with actual water flowing through. Some of the lobster's parts were animated. Lipa stated that for this video, she had to get into a character. She also explained that the lobster was really the main character and she was a supporting actress. The music video for "We're Good" premiered on 12 February 2021 via the weekly YouTube series, Released, where Lipa was a guest.

=== Analysis and synopsis ===
The music video for "We're Good" is from the perspective of a lobster on the Titanic. All the gowns Lipa wears are taken from the 2013 film The Great Gatsby, however, they all have an updated look to mirror Future Nostalgia's theme of merging "future" with "nostalgia". The visual opens with a view of The Abduction of Europa, a painting by Noël-Nicolas Coypel. The painting predicts the future of the passengers as they will soon experience the sinking of the Titanic. It then goes to a 1920s-styled restaurant where Lipa appears as a singer entertaining the upper-class guests of the ship. She is accompanied by a violinist, a double bassist and a pianist. The singer wears a vintage Prada gown covered in crystals with white silk gloves, oversized vintage jewelry and a pair of Marc Jacobs platform boots.

Lipa dances on a small stage while also sitting with the pianist on his bench. The video balances between shots of Lipa performing and shots of a group of lobsters in a tank. The lobsters have the claws tied together by bows as one main one watches in horror as their friends begin being taken out of the tank to be cooked in a boiling pot. The lobsters are then cooked and served to the passengers. The Abduction of Europa painting is later shown again during a brief intermission, before Lipa returns to the stage accompanied by two background dancers who wear beaded gowns with crystals, green sequins and luscious silks. The singer switches outfits into another Prada gown with a billowing skirt alongside a Fabergé necklace, emerald earrings, rings and bracelets. Lobsters continue to be taken to be cooked and served to the passengers as Lipa continues to perform. Lipa changes into a third outfit, a sequined, vintage Miu Miu gown with green silk gloves and her hair in a vampy up-do. Lipa's makeup consists of bronze eyeshadow with a gold shimmer alongside mascara, subtle midnight blue eyeliner and a russet shade lipstick on her slightly over-lined lips.

The final main lobster eventually gets chosen to be cooked. The cook brings it to the kitchen before realizing a pipe on the boat had malfunctioned, making it impossible for the lobster to be cooked. The lobster eventually gets thrown back into the tank before the restaurant is closed and everyone leaves. The ship then begins to sink, with the dining furniture sliding and crashing against a wall, and water surging through the restaurant and the ship's corridors. The lobster crashes through with the water, and eventually makes its way out and back into the sea. The camera then pans up to a frozen-breathed Lipa singing the song's final lines from a lifeboat as the image of the Titanic sinking appears in the background. The video closes with the image of the Titanic firing a flare gun as it sinks. The lobsters used in the video are a metaphor for love as lobsters mate for life, while the boat sinking mirrors the song's themes of feeling trapped in a relationship and setting love free. The sinking sees Lipa and the lobster both being thrown back into the sea, a metaphor to show that both will find new partners to start the relationship process over again.

=== Reception ===
Murphy thought it was a bold choice for Lipa to include the lobster allegory and the Titanic sinking in the video. For Billboard, Rania Aniftos called the video "stunning" and "surreal". Zoladz said that the video is "full of irreverent, not-sure-it-all-quite-lands humor" with the lobster escaping into the ocean. Pranešimas Spaudai of L'Officiel viewed the video as "fun" and "surreal" while noting that the "playfulness" of it is from the unexpected turn for the lobster. Kedem was confused on whether the Titanic theme was "underlying or overlying" but nevertheless named it "glamorous and slightly morbid". Murray named it "stylish" while Liam Hess of Vogue noted the fashion had flapper inspiration. The DIY staff viewed the video as a "wild journey of a sad lobster" and Swann called it "bonkers" and stated it gives the song "bonus points". Mic's Shawn Cooke said the video's retro style fits well and called it "kooky". Kitchen viewed the video as "awful, wannabe quirky" and thought it is "the nail in the song's coffin". In The Straits Times, Eddino Abdul Hadi noted the video's departure from Lipa's usual "club-friendly aesthetics" for "1920s-inspired glamour".

== Track listings ==
- Digital download and streaming
1. "We're Good" – 2:45
- Digital download and streaming – Dillon Francis remix
1. "We're Good" (Dillon Francis remix) – 3:06
- Digital download and streaming – Dillon Francis remix – radio edit
1. "We're Good" (Dillon Francis remix) [radio edit] – 3:05
- Digital download and streaming – Dillon Francis remix – Beatport version
1. "We're Good" (Dillon Francis remix) – 3:06
2. "We're Good" (Dillon Francis remix extended) – 3:38

== Personnel ==
- Dua Lipa – vocals
- Sly – production, backing vocals, engineering, keyboards, live drums, programming
- Emily Warren – vocal production, backing vocals
- Scott Harris – vocal production, backing vocals, guitar
- Caroline Ailin – backing vocals
- Tara Siegel – backing vocals
- Zach Gurka – backing vocals
- Andreas Lund – guitar
- Greg Eliason – engineering
- Brian Cruz – assistant engineer
- Josh Gudwin – mixing
- Heidi Wang – assistant mixing
- Chris Gehringer – mastering
- Will Quinnell – assistant mastering

== Charts ==
=== Weekly charts ===
Weekly chart performance for "We're Good"
Chart (2021–2023)	Peak position
Argentina Hot 100 (Billboard)	31
Australia (ARIA)	24
Austria (Ö3 Austria Top 40)	29
Belgium (Ultratop 50 Flanders)	32
Belgium (Ultratop 50 Wallonia)	34
Brazil (Top 100 Brasil)	76
Canada Hot 100 (Billboard)	21
Canada AC (Billboard)	18
Canada CHR/Top 40 (Billboard)	7
Canada Hot AC (Billboard)	6
CIS Airplay (TopHit)	77
Croatia International Airplay (HRT)	4
Czech Republic Airplay (ČNS IFPI)	7
Czech Republic Singles Digital (ČNS IFPI)	58
Euro Digital Song Sales (Billboard)	16
Finland Airplay (Radiosoittolista)	11
France (SNEP)	95
Germany (GfK)	52
Global 200 (Billboard)	21
Greece (IFPI)	21
Hungary (Rádiós Top 40)	3
Hungary (Single Top 40)	38
Hungary (Stream Top 40)	23
Iceland (Tónlistinn)	13
Ireland (IRMA)	17
Italy (FIMI)	66
Lithuania (AGATA)	14
Lithuania Airplay (TopHit)	187
Mexico (Billboard Mexican Airplay)	1
Netherlands (Dutch Top 40)	10
Netherlands (Single Top 100)	25
New Zealand (Recorded Music NZ)	24
Norway (VG-lista)	22
Poland (Polish Airplay Top 100)	41
Portugal (AFP)	33
Portugal Airplay (AFP)	24
Romania (Airplay 100)	39
San Marino (SMRRTV Top 50)	9
Singapore (RIAS)	21
Slovakia Airplay (ČNS IFPI)	14
Slovakia Singles Digital (ČNS IFPI)	21
Spain (PROMUSICAE)	54
Sweden (Sverigetopplistan)	31
Switzerland (Schweizer Hitparade)	38
UK Singles (OCC)	25
US Billboard Hot 100	31
US Adult Contemporary (Billboard)	29
US Adult Pop Airplay (Billboard)	12
US Dance/Mix Show Airplay (Billboard)	20
US Pop Airplay (Billboard)	11

=== Monthly charts ===
Monthly chart performance for "Whatever"
Chart (2021)	Peak position
CIS Airplay (TopHit)	98
Czech Republic (Rádio – Top 100)	16
Czech Republic (Singles Digitál Top 100)	70
Slovakia (Rádio – Top 100)	21
Slovakia (Singles Digitál Top 100)	45

=== Year-end charts ===
2021 year-end chart performance for "We're Good"
Chart (2021)	Position
Australia (ARIA)	83
Canada (Canadian Hot 100)	48
Croatia (ARC Top 100)	28
Global 200 (Billboard)	132
Hungary (Rádiós Top 40)	72
Netherlands (Dutch Top 40)	46
Netherlands (Single Top 100)	86
US Billboard Hot 100	90
US Adult Top 40 (Billboard)	42
US Mainstream Top 40 (Billboard)	34

== Certifications ==
Certifications and sales for "We're Good"
Region	Certification	Certified units/sales
Australia (ARIA)	Gold	35,000^{‡}
Austria (IFPI Austria)	Gold	15,000^{‡}
Belgium (BRMA)	Gold	20,000^{‡}
Canada (Music Canada)	2× Platinum	160,000^{‡}
Denmark (IFPI Danmark)	Gold	45,000^{‡}
Italy (FIMI)	Platinum	100,000^{‡}
New Zealand (RMNZ)	Platinum	30,000^{‡}
Norway (IFPI Norway)	Gold	30,000^{‡}
Poland (ZPAV)	Platinum	50,000^{‡}
Portugal (AFP)	Gold	5,000^{‡}
Spain (PROMUSICAE)	Platinum	60,000^{‡}
United Kingdom (BPI)	Gold	400,000^{‡}
United States (RIAA)	Gold	500,000^{‡}
^{‡} Sales+streaming figures based on certification alone.

== Release history ==
Release dates and formats for "We're Good"
Region	Date	Format(s)	Version	Label	Ref.
Various	11 February 2021	Digital download; streaming	Original	Warner	
Italy	12 February 2021	Radio airplay	Original	Warner	
United States	16 February 2021	Contemporary hit radio	Original	Warner	
United States	1 March 2021	Adult contemporary radio	Original	Warner	
Various	12 March 2021	Digital download; streaming	Dillon Francis remixes	Warner	

== See also ==
- List of Billboard Mexico Airplay number ones
