= Ruby Rosary =

2024 single by ASAP Rocky featuring J. Cole

Single by ASAP Rocky featuring J. Cole

from the album Don't Be Dumb (intended)
- Released: September 6, 2024
- Genre: Hip-hop
- Length: 4:16
- Label: AWGE; A$AP Worldwide; RCA
- Songwriters: Rakim Mayers; Jermaine Cole; Alan Maman; Masamune Kudo; Carlton McDowell; Jordan Patrick; Birgitta Yavari; Peter Sandvall
- Producer: The Alchemist

ASAP Rocky singles chronology
"Tailor Swif" (2024)	"Ruby Rosary" (2024)	"Big Dawgs" (Remix) (2024)

J. Cole singles chronology
"Summer Drop" (2024)	"Ruby Rosary" (2024)	"A Plate Of Collard Greens" (2024)

"Ruby Rosary" is a song by American rapper ASAP Rocky featuring fellow American rapper J. Cole. Produced by the Alchemist, it was released on September 6, 2024, as the intended third single from Rocky's upcoming fourth studio album Don't Be Dumb; however, the song was not included on the album.

== Composition and lyrics ==
The song contains downtempo piano-led beat. ASAP Rocky performs the first two verses, in which he brags about his fashion style and position in the rap industry, In the second verse, he directs subliminal shots toward fellow rapper Drake in response to his diss tracks "Push Ups" and "Family Matters", rapping "Who dared me to die? / You a dead man walkin', like you barely alive / Cut everything but the family ties / Cut the shit, cut the lies, word to the wise / Who in your top five? (Fuck your top five) / I don't get fresh to death, bitch, I'm buried alive / I heard dawg talkin' funny, like it's Family Guy / Carin' for niggas like I'm Mary or Bob / Made a promise to God / You gotta strive when you marry the mob". The lyrics reference "Buried Alive", the interlude on Drake's album Take Care which Kendrick Lamar (whom Drake is feuding with) raps on, as well as the disses that Drake and Lamar aimed at each other about their families in "Family Matters" and "Meet the Grahams". J. Cole performs the third and final verse, in which he raps about continuing to be a successful rapper and ignoring his past.

== Critical reception ==
The song was well received by music critics. Elias Andrews of HotNewHipHop wrote, "The Alchemist is one of the most consistently dazzling producers in hip hop. He knows how to mold his signature sound to whomever he's working with, and he nails the off-kilter, spooky ASAP vibe. ASAP Rocky gets more melodic with his flow than he did on previous singles, and it results in a fascinating groove. J Cole reminds us that when he's on, he's one of the best feature artists in the game. He makes a meal out of this beat. His rhyme scheme is do dense yet catchy that it sounds borderline stream of consciousness." Shawn Grant of The Source described the song as "blending Rocky's dynamic style with Cole's sharp lyricism." Tom Breihan of Stereogum commented "it's got Rocky flexing an understated swagger, rhyming 'Rosalía' with 'Jodeci' and 'ovaries.' J. Cole, meanwhile, absolutely spazzes out, spacewalking on the beat as if he's convinced himself that he can make everyone forget the Kendrick debacle if he raps hard enough." Aaron Williams of Uproxx called it a "mournful dirge for their foes".

== Charts ==
Chart performance for "Ruby Rosary"
Chart (2024)	Peak position
Canada Hot 100 (Billboard)	92
New Zealand Hot Singles (RMNZ)	5
US Billboard Hot 100	85
US Hot R&B/Hip-Hop Songs (Billboard)	22
