= Pray4DaGang =

Single by ASAP Rocky featuring KayCyy

from the album Don't Be Dumb (intended)
- Released: July 4, 2025 (Apple Music); July 5, 2025 (all music streaming services)
- Genre: Hip hop
- Length: 3:23
- Label: A$AP Worldwide; AWGE; RCA
- Songwriters: Rakim Mayers; James Blake; Carlton McDowell; Dacoury Natche; Jordan Brooks; Kalim Patel; Masamune Kudo
- Producers: James Blake; Khushi; Dominic Maker

ASAP Rocky singles chronology
"Big Dawgs" (Remix) (2024)	"Pray4DaGang" (2025)	"Trunks" (2025)

KayCyy singles chronology
"Eclipse" (2025)	"Pray4DaGang" (2025)

"Pray4DaGang" (stylized in all lowercase) is a song by American rapper ASAP Rocky, featuring Kenyan-American rapper KayCyy. It was released exclusively on Apple Music on July 4, 2025, and the following day on all music streaming services. A music video was released for the song but was privated soon after. Produced by James Blake, Khushi and Dominic Maker, it served as the intended fourth single from Rocky's upcoming fourth studio album Don't Be Dumb; however, the song was not included on the final album.

== Background and release ==
Rocky premiered the song, along with other unreleased snippets from Don't Be Dumb, during his AWGE's Paris Fashion Week show. "Pray4DaGang" was released as a 24-hour exclusive on Apple Music on July 4, 2025, and on other streaming platforms the following day, on July 5, 2025.

== Composition ==
"Pray4DaGang" opens with "heavenly harmonies and military-style drums". KayCyy's verses reflect on the emotional strain of pursuing career at the cost of personal relationships. The chorus is led by ASAP Rocky, who delivers emotionally charged lyrics addressing themes of fame, personal sacrifice, and isolation. Toward the end, the vocals are layered with sound effects resembling bombs dropping, culminating with the lyrics: "pray for the world".

== Critical reception ==
Jason Lipshutz of Billboard described "Pray4DaGang" as a track that builds anticipation for Rocky's upcoming album, noting that it "impressively re-centers the veteran rapper's musical approach during a busy moment for his brand: his flow is nimble and his lyricism sharp". Aron A of HotNewHipHop praised the track as "his most emotionally vulnerable track in recent memory."

== Music video ==
An accompanying music video premiered on Apple Music on July 4, 2025, and was later uploaded to YouTube. However, the YouTube visual had a runtime of only two minutes, in contrast to the full version available on Apple Music. The YouTube video was subsequently set to private within hours of its release. As of July 9, 2025, the music video is only available on Apple Music.

The music video, directed by Marius Gonzalez, features Rocky and other people fighting against police and authority figures. The phrase "Don't Be Dumb" appears throughout the video, which also portrays scenes of civil unrest across notable American landmarks, including locations in New York City and near the Lincoln Memorial.
