= Order of Protection (song) =

2026 song by ASAP Rocky

Song by ASAP Rocky

from the album Don't Be Dumb
- Released: January 16, 2026
- Genre: Hip-hop; trap
- Length: 2:51
- Label: AWGE; ASAP; RCA
- Songwriters: Rakim Mayers; Jordan Patrick; Larrance Dopson
- Producers: ASAP Rocky; Patrick; Rance

"Order of Protection" is a song by American rapper ASAP Rocky and the opening track from his fourth studio album, Don't Be Dumb (2026). It was produced by Rocky himself, Jordan Patrick and Rance of 1500 or Nothin'.

== Composition ==
The song features synthesizers, drums and a choir. In the lyrics, ASAP Rocky notes the lengthy interval following the release of his previous album, Testing, but proclaims he has maintained his standing as a leading figure in the hip-hop industry. He references the obstacles that he encountered during his period of working on Don't Be Dumb, such as dealing with many leaks of his music and his recent criminal trial regarding the shooting of his former friend and collaborator ASAP Relli.

== Critical reception ==
The song was well-received by music critics. In a ranking of tracks from Don't Be Dumb, Billboard's Angel Diaz placed it at number 11, stating "The beat knocks and he's giving fans relevant bars about being a superstar rapper in the digital age. Don't Be Dumb is off to a good start here." Alexander Cole of HotNewHipHop wrote "Quite frankly, this is a great way to start off the album. The production here is brooding, and Rocky sounds like he has a lot to say. His flow is fantastic on the track, and with the instrumental taking you in all sorts of different directions, it is clear that Rocky means a whole lot of business right now." Reviewing the album for Consequence, Kiana Fitzgerald stated "Even songs that sound like they were simultaneously overestimated and underthought (the album opener 'Order of Protection') manage to feel attention-grabbing." Casey Epstein-Gross of Paste remarked that the song "sets the tone with that glassy, half-regal, half-grimy intro—choral swells, weird little synth squeaks, hallway-echo drums".

== Charts ==
Chart performance for "Order of Protection"
Chart (2026)	Peak position
Canada Hot 100 (Billboard)	59
Global 200 (Billboard)	105
Greece International (IFPI)	45
Latvia Streaming (LaIPA)	15
Lithuania (AGATA)	38
New Zealand Hot Singles (RMNZ)	5
Poland (Polish Streaming Top 100)	91
Portugal (AFP)	165
Slovakia Singles Digital (ČNS IFPI)	83
US Billboard Hot 100	54
US Hot R&B/Hip-Hop Songs (Billboard)	16
