= Testing (album) =

2018 studio album by ASAP Rocky

Studio album by ASAP Rocky
- Released: May 25, 2018
- Studios: Germano, New York City, New York
- Genres: Experimental hip-hop; psychedelic
- Length: 52:16
- Labels: ASAP; Polo Grounds; RCA
- Producers: Boi-1da; Boys Noize; CharlieMumbles; Clams Casino; Crazy Mike; D-Town the Great; Dean Blunt; Dev Hynes; Estiee; FnZ; Jim Jonsin; Kelvin Krash; Lord Flacko; Nez & Rio; Rico Love; Skepta; Tank God

ASAP Rocky chronology
At. Long. Last. ASAP (2015)	Testing (2018)	Don't Be Dumb (2026)

Singles from Testing
- 1. "ASAP Forever" Released: April 5, 2018; 2. "Praise the Lord (Da Shine)" Released: June 26, 2018

Testing (stylized in all caps) is the third studio album by American rapper ASAP Rocky. It was released on May 25, 2018, by ASAP Worldwide, Polo Grounds Music and RCA Records. The album includes guest appearances from Frank Ocean, Kid Cudi, Skepta, French Montana, Kodak Black, Dev Hynes and FKA Twigs, among others, and was produced primarily by Hector Delgado and ASAP Rocky himself, alongside a variety of high-profile record producers.

Testing was supported by two singles: "ASAP Forever" and "Praise the Lord (Da Shine)", alongside numerous promotional singles. The album received generally positive reviews from critics and debuted at number four on the US Billboard 200, earning 75,000 album-equivalent units of which 13,000 were pure sales; it became ASAP Rocky's third consecutive top-five album on the chart.

== Background ==
In September 2017, ASAP Rocky announced the release of a new album, originally scheduled for a late 2017 release. The previous month, ASAP Rocky released Cozy Tapes Vol. 2: Too Cozy as part of the rap collective ASAP Mob.

In January 2018, the album's title was cryptically left under SoundCloud song descriptions, until being officially confirmed in May 2018. In an interview with GQ, Rocky stated: "My new album is really about testing new sounds. People are scared to test new sounds, so they go with what's current 'cause it's the easy thing to do. The top 100 songs sound a certain way. People cater more to that because it's a bigger demographic behind that, or it's a guaranteed demographic behind that. I prefer to experiment and have my crowd grow with me and to reach new crowds. I don't just rap—I actually make music. That's why it takes time. These sonics represent me."

The album artwork was unveiled on May 21, 2018, while the tracklist was announced three days later.

== Cover artwork ==
The cover of Testing features a photo by Houston-based creative director Cary Fagan, in which 10 shadowy figures surround a bold typeface logo.

== Promotion ==
In January 2018, a series of non-album songs were released by ASAP Rocky onto SoundCloud, including "5ive Stars", "Above" and "Money Bags Freestyle". The song, "Bad Company" featuring BlocBoy JB, was released as a promotional single on March 28, 2018.

The album's lead single, "ASAP Forever" featuring Moby, was released on April 5, 2018. The song peaked at number 65 on the US Billboard Hot 100. The album version of the single includes guest appearances from Kid Cudi and T.I.

The album's second single, "Praise the Lord (Da Shine)" featuring Skepta, was released to rhythmic and urban contemporary radio on June 26, 2018.

== Critical reception ==
Professional ratings
Aggregate scores
Source	Rating
AnyDecentMusic?	6.4/10
Metacritic	67/100
Review scores
Source	Rating
AllMusic	3/5 stars
The A.V. Club	B−
Consequence	B+
Exclaim!	7/10
The Guardian	3/5 stars
Highsnobiety	5.0/5
HipHopDX	2.9/5
HotNewHipHop	81%
Now	3/5
Pitchfork	6.7/10

Testing was met with generally positive reviews. At Metacritic, which assigns a normalized rating out of 100 to reviews from mainstream publications, the album received an average score of 67, based on eight reviews. Aggregator AnyDecentMusic? gave it 6.4 out of 10, based on their assessment of the critical consensus.

Bansky Gonzalez of Consequence gave a positive review, stating "It's a welcome addition to a genre that has become so occupied with spacey, bare-bones operations and overly simplistic results". Dean Van Nguyen of The Guardian commented that Testing is "completely out of step with any mainstream rap album you're likely to hear this year", but "is a spottier affair" where "too many tracks minimise his strengths". Kassandra Guagliardi of Exclaim! stated that the album is "A shedding of the 29-year-old artist's old skin and a rebirth of something more profound and slightly more complicated", complimenting the album's experimental aesthetic and identity. Andreas Hale of Billboard complimented the album's experimentation but believed that ASAP Rocky is "still style over substance and his efforts at experimentation don't always click like he wants them to". Jake Boyer of Highsnobiety acclaimed Testing, labelling it "an absolute triumph. It does not have the earth-shattering impact of his genre-defining debut, nor does it have any one track with as much immediacy as, say, a 'Fuckin' Problems', but it is unequivocally his most thoughtful, most ambitious, and most rewarding project to date", praising the album's production, experimentation, cohesion and guest appearances. Nina Hernandez of The A.V. Club said, "Though the finished project is as loose and incohesive as its title might suggest, there's a lot to like about Testing".

In a mixed review, online hip-hop publication HipHopDX wrote that "There is no new movement birthed; there is no paradigm shift about the occur; it's simply as the title states: a series of harmonic evaluations meant to gauge audience reaction. Instead of creating a new wave, ASAP Rocky has drowned himself in his own ambitions and lost his identity along the way". Similarly, Stephen Kearse of Pitchfork believed there to be flaws in the experimentation, writing: "Rocky is enamored with collision. His approach to songcraft on Testing is to mash sounds together and capture the friction. The results are often dismal." Kevin Ritchie of Now believed that "Testing's title might suggest experimentation, but it delivers more on tentativeness, with a smattering of solid songs mixed into aesthetically interesting but unresolved experiments", criticizing the lyricism and flows that "aren't as ambitious as the production". Fred Thomas also provided a mixed review for AllMusic, stating that "While in some ways Testing is more musical than anything we've heard from ASAP Rocky before, it's also more confused, with ideas and musical shifts colliding at times to the point of randomness. The album title itself refers to testing new sounds and pushing in new directions in hopes of growth. Like any set of experiments, Testing offers some success, some failure, and some moments that can only be met with a blank stare. Though songs like the gorgeous Frank Ocean collaboration 'Purity', or the darkly simmering 'Fukk Sleep' featuring FKA Twigs, take risks that push ASAP Rocky to new, exciting territory, some of the experiments that made it onto Testing could have been left bubbling over in the lab rather than weighing down the rest of the album".

=== Year-end lists ===
Select year-end rankings of Testing
Publication	List	Rank	Ref.
Consequence	The Top 50 Albums of 2018	24	
Highsnobiety	The 25 Best Albums of 2018	4	

== Commercial performance ==
Testing debuted at number four on the US Billboard 200 chart, earning 75,000 album-equivalent units with 13,000 copies in pure album sales, becoming ASAP Rocky's third consecutive top-five album on the chart. In its second week, the album dropped to number 15 on the chart, with 26,000 album-equivalent units (1,000 in pure albums sales). In its third week, the album dropped to number 22 on the chart. In its fourth and fifth weeks on the Billboard 200, the album dropped to number 37 and 41, respectively. It left the top 50 on its sixth week, ending up at number 56, before dropping to number 60 during its seventh week on the charts. On October 16, 2019, the album was certified gold by the Recording Industry Association of America (RIAA) for combined sales and album-equivalent units of over 500,000 units in the United States.

== Track listing ==
Testing track listing
No.	Title	Writer(s)	Producer(s)	Length
1.	"Distorted Records"	Rakim Mayers; Mario Loving; Nesbitt Wesonga; Hector Delgado	Delgado; Lord Flacko; Nez & Rio	2:20
2.	"ASAP Forever" (Remix) (featuring Moby, T.I. and Kid Cudi)	Mayers; Delgado; Jordan Garrett; Chloe Danquah; Scott Mescudi; Clifford Harris; Richard Hall	Delgado; Lord Flacko; Jordie X^{[a]}	5:15
3.	"Tony Tone"	Mayers; Michael Mule; Delgado; Isaac de Boni; Sean Combs; Roger Webb	FnZ; Delgado; Lord Flacko	3:28
4.	"Fukk Sleep" (featuring FKA Twigs)	Mayers; Andrew VanWyngarden; Delgado; Matthew Samuels; Michael Burman; Tahliah Barnett; Albert Johnson; Gary Lucas; Michael Tyler	Delgado; Boi-1da; FnZ; Lord Flacko	3:12
5.	"Praise the Lord (Da Shine)" (featuring Skepta)	Mayers; Joseph Junior Adenuga; Delgado	Skepta	3:25
6.	"Calldrops" (featuring Kodak Black)	Mayers; Alexander Ridha; Delgado; Ade Odunlami; Dieuson Octave; Dave Bixby; Hayward Ivy; Shelly Manne; Brad Jordan; John Okuribido	Boys Noize; Delgado^{[a]}; Lord Flacko^{[a]}	2:42
7.	"Buck Shots"	Mayers; Delgado; Kelvin Magnusen; Jordan Carter; Toumani Diabate	Kelvin Krash	2:47
8.	"Gunz N Butter" (featuring Juicy J)	Mayers; Delgado; Dean Blunt; Mike Foster; Jordan Houston; Paul Beauregard; Patrick Houston	Delgado; Blunt; Lord Flacko; Crazy Mike	3:33
9.	"Brotha Man" (featuring French Montana)	Mayers; Richard Butler; Dwayne Nesmith; Karim Kharbouch; Christopher Breaux; Calvin Broadus; Leon Michels; Toby Pazner; Jeffrey Silverman	Rico Love; D-Town the Great; Delgado; Lord Flacko	3:36
10.	"OG Beeper"	Mayers; Loving; Wesonga; Ridha; Delgado; James Baker; Ivy; Tommy Wright III	Nez & Rio; Boys Noize^{[a]}	2:35
11.	"Kids Turned Out Fine"	Mayers; Bryan Rogers; Esteban Scott; Delgado	CharlieMumbles; Estiee; Delgado^{[a]}; Lord Flacko^{[a]}	3:03
12.	"Hun43rd"	Mayers; Devonté Hynes; Delgado; Tupac Shakur; Tyruss Himes; Maurice Shakur; Diron Rivers; Walter Burns	Hynes	4:02
13.	"Changes"	Mayers; James Scheffer; Mule; de Boni; Gerard Powell II; Delgado; Michael Burman	Jim Jonsin; FnZ; Delgado; Lord Flacko; Jerry "Tizhimself" Powell^{[a]}; DJ Khalil^{[a]}	5:14
14.	"Black Tux, White Collar"	Mayers; Michael Volpe; Louis Bell; Delgado; Magnusen	Clams Casino; Tank God; Delgado^{[a]}; Lord Flacko^{[a]}; Kelvin Krash^{[a]}	2:42
15.	"Purity" (featuring Frank Ocean)	Mayers; Blunt; Mule; Delgado; de Boni; Breaux; Lauryn Hill	Blunt; FnZ; Delgado; Lord Flacko	4:22
Total length:				52:16

Notes

- "Calldrops" stylized as "CALLDROPS"
- ^{^[a]} signifies an additional producer
- "ASAP Forever" features background vocals by Khloe Anna
- "Tony Tone" features background vocals by Puff Daddy and additional vocals by Akia Harvey
- "Fukk Sleep" features background vocals by Hector Delgado
- "Calldrops" features background vocals by Acyde and Dean Blunt
- "Buck Shots" features background vocals by Playboi Carti, Smooky MarGielaa and Kelvin Krash
- "Brotha Man" features background vocals by Frank Ocean and Snoop Dogg
- "OG Beeper" features background vocals by BlocBoy JB
- "Kids Turned Out Fine" features background vocals by Mateo "Teo" Arias
- "Hun43rd" features background vocals by ASAP Mob
- "Black Tux, White Collar" features background vocals by Mikky Ekko

Sample credits

- "ASAP Forever" contains a sample of "Porcelain", written by Richard Melville Hall, as performed by Moby.
- "Tony Tone" contains a sample of "Man Inside", written and performed by Roger Webb.
- "Fukk Sleep" contains a sample of "FYM", written by Albert Johnson, Gary Lucas, Matthew Samuels and Michael Tyler, as performed by Joyner Lucas.
- "Praise the Lord (Da Shine)" contains a sample of "Midsummer Again – Roma Surrectum II", written by Viktor Tärnholm.
- "Calldrops" contains a sample of "Morning Sun", written and performed by Dave Bixby; and "Money & the Power", written by Hayword Ivy, as performed by DJ Squeeky.
- "Buck Shots" contains a sample of "The Format", written by Anthony Cruz, as performed by AZ.
- "Gunz n Butter" contains a sample of "Still Ridin Clean", written by Patrick Houston, Jordan Houston and Paul Beauregard, as performed by Project Pat.
- "Brotha Man" contains a sample of "Intermission", written by Leon Michels, Toby Pazner and Jeffrey Silverman, as performed by Lee Fields.
- "OG Beeper" contains a sample of "Street Type Nigga" and "Shoot to Kill", written and performed by Tommy Wright III; and "Still Get My Dick Sucked", written by Hayword Ivy, as performed by DJ Squeeky.
- "Kids Turned Out Fine" samples "Don't Come Home Today" by Good Morning.
- "Hun43rd" contains a sample of "Cradle to the Grave", written by Tupac Shakur, Tyruss Himes, Maurice Shakur, Diron Rivers and Walter Burns, as performed by Thug Life.
- "Changes" features a sample of International Players Anthem (I Choose You) by UGK featuring Outkast.
- "Purity" contains a sample of "I Gotta Find Peace of Mind", written and performed by Lauryn Hill.

== Personnel ==
Credits adapted from ASAP Rocky's official Twitter account and Tidal.

Instrumentation

- Andrew VanWyngarden – keyboard (track 4)
- Devonté Hynes – bass (track 13)
- Michael Burman – guitar (track 13)
- Mikey Freedom Hart – guitar, keyboard (track 13)
- Eric Alcock – guitar (track 15)

Technical

- Hector Delgado – recording, mixing (except track 13)
- Sam Houselander – recording (tracks 2, 11)
- Alex Ridha – recording (track 6)
- Nico Marzouka – recording (track 13)
- Marylebone – recording (track 15)
- Tom Elmhirst – mixing (track 13)
- Billy Cumella – mixing assistance (tracks 1, 3, 5–7, 9, 11, 14, 15)
- Federico "C Sik" Lopez – mixing assistance (tracks 1, 4, 8, 10, 12)
- Barry McCready – mixing assistance (track 2)
- Dan Fyfe – mixing assistance (tracks 10, 12)
- Tatsuya Sato – mastering

== Charts ==
=== Weekly charts ===
Chart performance for Testing
Chart (2018–2019)	Peak position
Australian Albums (ARIA)	5
Austrian Albums (Ö3 Austria)	10
Belgian Albums (Ultratop Flanders)	9
Belgian Albums (Ultratop Wallonia)	32
Canadian Albums (Billboard)	3
Czech Albums (ČNS IFPI)	11
Danish Albums (Hitlisten)	3
Dutch Albums (Album Top 100)	11
Finnish Albums (Suomen virallinen lista)	14
French Albums (SNEP)	93
German Albums (Offizielle Top 100)	22
Irish Albums (IRMA)	10
Italian Albums (FIMI)	20
Latvian Albums (LAIPA)	12
New Zealand Albums (RMNZ)	4
Norwegian Albums (VG-lista)	3
Slovak Albums (ČNS IFPI)	11
Swedish Albums (Sverigetopplistan)	10
Swiss Albums (Schweizer Hitparade)	4
UK Albums (Official Charts)	11
US Billboard 200	4
US Top R&B/Hip-Hop Albums (Billboard)	3

=== Year-end charts ===
2018 year-end chart performance for Testing
Chart (2018)	Position
Danish Albums (Hitlisten)	66
Icelandic Albums (Plötutíóindi)	51
US Billboard 200	125
US Top R&B/Hip-Hop Albums (Billboard)	57

== Certifications ==
Certifications and sales for Testing
Region	Certification	Certified units/sales
Brazil (Pro-Música Brasil)	Gold	20,000^{‡}
Canada (Music Canada)	Gold	40,000^{‡}
Denmark (IFPI Danmark)	Platinum	20,000^{‡}
France (SNEP)	Gold	50,000^{‡}
Poland (ZPAV)	2× Platinum	40,000^{‡}
United Kingdom (BPI)	Silver	60,000^{‡}
United States (RIAA)	Gold	500,000^{‡}
^{‡} Sales+streaming figures based on certification alone.
