= Stay Here 4 Life =

2026 song by ASAP Rocky featuring Brent Faiyaz

Single by ASAP Rocky featuring Brent Faiyaz

from the album Don't Be Dumb
- Released: February 3, 2026
- Genre: Hip-hop; R&B; pop rap
- Length: 5:46
- Label: AWGE; ASAP; RCA
- Songwriters: Rakim Mayers; Christopher Wood; Chauncey Alexander Hollis; Luke Fenton; Larrance Dopson; Stephen Bruner; Kenyatta Frazier Jr.; Clif Shayne
- Producers: ASAP Rocky; Faiyaz; Hit-Boy; Loukeman; Rance; Thundercat

ASAP Rocky singles chronology
"Helicopter" (2026)	"Stay Here 4 Life" (2026)

"Stay Here 4 Life" is a song by American rapper ASAP Rocky. It was released to US Rhythmic Radio on February 3, 2026 as the third single from his fourth studio album, Don't Be Dumb. It features American R&B singer Brent Faiyaz and samples the melody and chorus vocals from his song "Full Moon", which itself samples "Mewtwo" by Ken Carson. The song was produced by Rocky, Faiyaz, Hit-Boy, Loukeman, Rance of 1500 or Nothin' and Thundercat.

== Composition ==
"Stay Here 4 Life" is a hip-hop song with elements of R&B and 1980s funk. It is an ode to ASAP Rocky's relationship with Rihanna, exploring intimacy and the challenges of maintaining a private life while in the public eye. Brent Faiyaz performs the third verse, also borrowed from the original track by Faiyaz. The beat switches toward the end, which finds Rocky ranting against fans who are apparently disappointed by him settling down with Rihanna.

== Critical reception ==
The song received generally positive reviews. Angel Diaz of Billboard and Adam Brocklesby of Deeds Magazine both regarded Brent Faiyaz's feature as a "cheat code" for the song, which the former also ranked as the second best song from Don't Be Dumb. Antonio Johri of Complex praised the sampling, commenting "The result feels both fresh and familiar, with Brent's airy vocals providing a welcome contrast to the three hard-hitting trap cuts that open the project. This flip makes 'Stay Here 4 Life' one of the more enjoyable melodic moments on DBD, and serves as a reminder that sampling recent songs, even those released less than six months ago, can still feel inspired when executed creatively." Clash's Robin Murray stated the song "feels like his re-commitment to the art, a high point on an album laden with anthems", while Consequence's Kiana Fitzgerald wrote that the beat switch "feel[s] distracting initially, but ultimately boost[s] the varied atmosphere of the album". Alexander Cole of HotNewHipHop commented "This is one of those songs that is immediately going to get some play from fans. After all, who doesn't want to hear Brent sing his heart out? He sounds phenomenal on this song, and the chemistry with Rocky is as solid as ever. There are some interesting elements here, especially when you consider the griminess of the previous tracks. We also get a cool beat switch at the end, which brings it all together." Variety's Peter A. Berry remarked that the song "unfolds like a player's catharsis. Distilling images of his own domestic dreams, Rocky sounds like he's more than cool leaving his jersey in the rafters."

Tom Breihan of Stereogum described the song as a "more textured version of the old, clichéd rap&B love song. It's fine, but it's a little boring." Casey Epstein-Gross of Paste believed the outro of the song to be "weirdly self-invented", writing "It plays less like a response to real criticism than a shadowboxing session with a Reddit comment that lodged itself in his brain years ago. As you said, man, your baby mama is Rihanna. No one thinks you lost."

== Charts ==
Chart performance for "Stay Here 4 Life"
Chart (2026)	Peak position
Canada Hot 100 (Billboard)	33
Czech Republic Singles Digital (ČNS IFPI)	84
Global 200 (Billboard)	34
Greece International (IFPI)	14
Latvia Streaming (LaIPA)	4
Lithuania (AGATA)	17
New Zealand Hot Singles (RMNZ)	2
Poland (Polish Streaming Top 100)	63
Portugal (AFP)	71
Slovakia Singles Digital (ČNS IFPI)	49
South Africa Streaming (TOSAC)	71
UK Singles (Official Charts)	49
US Billboard Hot 100	23
US Hot R&B/Hip-Hop Songs (Billboard)	7
US Rhythmic Airplay (Billboard)	10
