= ASAP Forever =

2018 single by ASAP Rocky

Single by ASAP Rocky featuring Moby

from the album Testing
- Released: April 5, 2018
- Genre: East Coast hip hop
- Length: 3:53
- Label: ASAP Worldwide; Polo Grounds; RCA
- Songwriter(s): Rakim Mayers; Hector Delgado; Jordan Garrett; Chloe Danquah; Moby
- Producer(s): Delgado; Lord Flacko; Jordie X

ASAP Rocky singles chronology
"Bad Company" (2018)	"ASAP Forever" (2018)	"Doja Sweet" (2018)

Moby singles chronology
"This Wild Darkness" (2018)	"ASAP Forever" (2018)	"Power Is Taken" (2018)

Music video
- "ASAP Forever" on YouTube

"ASAP Forever" is a song by American rapper ASAP Rocky, released on April 5, 2018, as the lead single for his third studio album Testing (2018). The song contains a sample of "Porcelain" by American musician Moby, who is credited as a featured artist. The song also features background vocals by singer Khloe Anna and production from Hector Delgado, Rocky (under the pseudonym Lord Flacko), and Jordie X.

== Background and composition ==
In December 2017, ASAP Rocky previewed the song on Instagram; it was originally titled "Gang". Shortly after the track was released on April 5, 2018, Rocky debuted it live on The Tonight Show Starring Jimmy Fallon. The song details Rocky's loyalty to the ASAP Mob and his life, such as his interest in Dominican Republic cuisine. Rocky also mentions that he and his partner "kiss to Frank Ocean and Blonde", shouts out to Margiela and Goyard, and uses multiple fashion puns.

== Music video ==
The music video was directed by Dexter Navy and released on April 5, 2018. It starts with ASAP Rocky and his ASAP Mob collective in New York City, then shifts into different scenes as Rocky raps the first verse. In the ending, he falls into an abyss and is wearing a belt with the word "TESTING" on it.

== Remix ==
"ASAP Forever (Remix)"

Song by ASAP Rocky featuring Moby, T.I. and Kid Cudi

from the album Testing
- Released: May 25, 2018
- Recorded: 2018
- Genre: Hip hop
- Length: 5:15
- Label: ASAP Worldwide; Sony; Polo Grounds; RCA
- Songwriter(s): Rakim Mayers; Hector Delgado; Jordan Garrett; Chloe Danquah; Scott Mescudi; Clifford Harris; Richard Hall
- Producer(s): Delgado; Lord Flacko; Jordie X

The song was officially remixed featuring vocals from fellow American rappers T.I. and Kid Cudi. T.I. provided the intro for the song, while Cudi contributed a guest verse. The remix appears as the second track on ASAP Rocky's third album Testing.

== Charts ==
Chart (2018–2019)	Peak position
Australia (ARIA)	72
Canada (Canadian Hot 100)	41
France (SNEP)	100
New Zealand (Recorded Music NZ)	35
Switzerland (Schweizer Hitparade)	45
US Billboard Hot 100	63
US Hot R&B/Hip-Hop Songs (Billboard)	31

== Certifications ==
Region	Certification	Certified units/sales
Australia (ARIA)	Platinum	70,000^{‡}
Canada (Music Canada)	Platinum	80,000^{‡}
New Zealand (RMNZ) Remix version	Gold	15,000^{‡}
Poland (ZPAV)	Gold	25,000^{‡}
United Kingdom (BPI)	Silver	200,000^{‡}
United States (RIAA)	Platinum	1,000,000^{‡}
^{‡} Sales+streaming figures based on certification alone.
