= Vania Heymann =

Israeli artist and film director (born 1986)

Vania Heymann וניה הימן
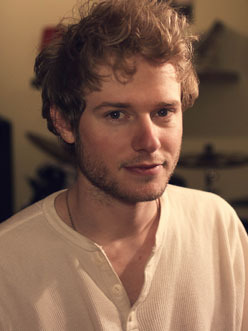
- Born: March 27, 1986 (age 40); Jerusalem
- Occupation: Director
- Years active: 2010–present

Vania Heymann (Hebrew: וניה הימן; born March 27, 1986) is an Israeli artist and film director. His work includes music videos for artists such as Bob Dylan, Coldplay, Dua Lipa, DJ Snake, Selena Gomez and Sabrina Carpenter. His music videos were nominated for three Grammys in the Best Music Video category, and multiple VMA awards. Heymann also directs commercials, including spots for Apple, Nike and the Toyota.

== Early life ==
Heymann was born and raised in Jerusalem. His parents were French Jewish immigrants to Israel and he was raised in a religious Jewish household. He studied at Hartman High School and did his military service in the Israel Defense Forces in the Nahal Brigade. During his military service he became secular.

== Film directing career ==
Heymann began his studies at the Bezalel Academy of Arts and Design in 2010 in the Visual Communications track. That year Heymann created a video dealing with religious symbols through replacing them with a simple IKEA watering can; this homework assignment was posted to YouTube and has since become viral gaining hundreds of thousands of views on YouTube and Vimeo. Many of its viewers saw this video as an atheistic composition manifesting Russell's atheistic teapot. A number of prominent atheist thinkers shared the video online and supported Heymann, including biologist Richard Dawkins and author Sam Harris.

In 2011, his second year at Bezalel, Heymann created three videos as homework assignments, the videos were posted to YouTube and quickly became viral . The first video was a homage to the French series Bref, in which the video tells (very quickly) the story of a failed blind date. The second video was "Der Mensch" an opening title sequence for a would be Orthodox Western, whose main character frees Agunot. The third video was "shelf life," in which Heymann animated characters on food packaging in the refrigerator; the third video caught the attention of mainstream media in Israel.

In January 2013, the TV program Eretz Nehederet ("Wonderful Country") of Channel 2 broadcast a series called Bekizur ("in short") adapted from the French series, Bref, composed of two-minute episodes. Heymann directed the series and participated in writing the Hebrew script. In April 2013 Heymann created another beer commercial this time for Maccabee beer, featuring Isaiah Mustafa. A YouTube video of the ad received one million hits.

In November 2013, the website of Bob Dylan released an interactive music video which Heymann created and directed for the song "Like a Rolling Stone; this song was first released in 1965 and had not previously had an authorized video. The video allows viewers to flip through 16 television channels, which all feature characters who are lip-syncing the lyrics of the song.

In December 2013, Time Magazine named the video best music video of 2013. The video has since won many prizes including a Webby Award for Best Editing and 4 Gold Lions at the Cannes Lions in the Film Craft, Direct, and Branded Content & Entertainment categories.

In 2016, Heymann began collaborating with Gal Muggia on music videos and commercials and their first joint work was a music video for the Coldplay song "Up&Up". They have subsequently directed music videos for artist such as DJ Snake, Tove Lo, Dua Lipa, ASAP Rocky, Trevor Daniel and Selena Gomez, along with work for brands such as Apple, Nike and Evian.

== Videography ==
=== Television ===
- 2013- "Bekizur"

=== Music videos ===
- 2012- Asaf Avidan – "Different Pulses"
- 2012- Roy Kafri and Tal Tirangel - "Yes I Did Approach Ido"
- 2012- TYP - "Young Professionals"
- 2012- Adi Ulmansky - "A.D.I"
- 2013- Bob Dylan - "Like a Rolling Stone"
- 2014- Roy Kafri - "Mayokero"
- 2014- Dana Ivgi - "On The Bus"
- 2015- Keys N Krates Feat. Katy B - "Save Me"
- 2015- CeeLo - "Robin Williams"
- 2016- Coldplay - "Up&Up" (co-directed with Gal Muggia)
- 2018- DJ Snake - "Magenta Riddim"
- 2019- Tove Lo - "Glad He's Gone"
- 2020- Trevor Daniel and Selena Gomez - "Past Life"
- 2021- Dua Lipa - "We're Good" (co-directed with Gal Muggia)
- 2024- A$AP Rocky - "Tailor Swif" (co-directed with Gal Muggia)
- 2025- Sabrina Carpenter - "Manchild" (co-directed with Gal Muggia)

=== Commercials ===
- 2012- Shapiro Beer
- 2012- Pepsi Max BeatBox
- 2013- Maccabee Beer ft. Isaiah Mustafa
- 2013- Teaser for Tel Aviv's White Night
- 2016- SodaStream- Heavy Bubbles
- 2017- Toyota - Short Films
- 2018- Nike
- 2020- Apple- iPhone 12
- 2020- Dacia Duster
- 2020 - Apple- Airpod Max
