= Punk Rocky =

2026 single by A$AP Rocky

Single by A$AP Rocky

from the album Don't Be Dumb
- Released: January 5, 2026
- Recorded: 2025
- Genre: Indie rock; psychedelic rock
- Length: 3:55
- Label: AWGE; A$AP Worldwide; RCA
- Songwriters: Rakim Mayers; Cristoforo Donadi; Zach Fogarty; Adam Feeney
- Producers: ASAP Rocky; Cristoforo Donadi; Zach Forgarty (co.); Ging (co.)

ASAP Rocky singles chronology
"Trunks" (2025)	"Punk Rocky" (2026)	"Helicopter" (2026)

Music video
- "Punk Rocky" Video on YouTube

"Punk Rocky" is a song by American rapper A$AP Rocky, released on January 5, 2026 as the lead single for his fourth studio album, Don't Be Dumb. The song features background vocals by Jordan Patrick, it was written and produced by Rocky himself, along with Cristoforo Donadi, Zach Fogarty and Ging.

== Promotion and release ==
On January 2, 2026, Rocky released a 14-second teaser video on his social media pages, featuring a small snippet of the song and video. He captioned it:

"VIDEO OF THE FUCCKIN YEAR !!!🔥 HAPPY NEW YEAR 2026 -DONTBEDUMB PUNK ROCKY MONDAY".

The cover art for the single is heavily inspired by PaRappa the Rapper.

== Live performances ==
Rocky performed "Punk Rocky" and a medley of "Don't Be Dumb/Trip Baby" and "Helicopter", alongside Danny Elfman and Thundercat playing drums and bass, respectively, during Rocky's first performance and appeared in the background during his second, on Saturday Night Live as the musical guest of the show on January 17.

== Music video ==
An accompanying music video for "Punk Rocky", directed by Rocky himself, alongside Folkert Verdoorn and Simon Becks, was also released on January 5, 2026. It stars Winona Ryder and features cameo appearances from Danny Elfman, Thundercat and ASAP Nast. The music video features Rocky performing in a suburban garage, with Ryder acting as the next door neighbour.

== Personnel ==
Credits adapted from Apple Music.

- Jordan Patrick – background vocals
- Cristoforo Donadi – guitar
- Zach Forgaty – guitar
- Ging – bass, drums
- Rob Kinelski – mixing
- Tatsuya Sato – mastering
- Ray Bergin – assistant mastering

== Charts ==
=== Weekly charts ===
Weekly chart performance
Chart (2026)	Peak position
Australia Hip Hop/R&B (ARIA)	18
Canada Hot 100 (Billboard)	56
Estonia Airplay (TopHit)	62
Global 200 (Billboard)	98
Greece International (IFPI)	69
Ireland (IRMA)	80
Japan Hot Overseas (Billboard Japan)	19
Latvia Streaming (LaIPA)	6
Lithuania (AGATA)	12
Netherlands (Single Tip)	14
New Zealand Hot Singles (RMNZ)	6
Poland (Polish Streaming Top 100)	87
Slovakia Singles Digital (ČNS IFPI)	62
Switzerland (Schweizer Hitparade)	62
UK Singles (Official Charts)	87
US Billboard Hot 100	56
US Hot Rock & Alternative Songs (Billboard)	9

=== Monthly charts ===
Monthly chart performance
Chart (2026)	Peak position
Estonia Airplay (TopHit)	68
