= Tailor Swif =

2024 single by ASAP Rocky

Single by ASAP Rocky

from the album Don't Be Dumb (intended)
- Released: August 30, 2024
- Recorded: 2021–2022
- Genre: Hip hop; trap
- Length: 3:10
- Label: AWGE; RCA; A$AP Worldwide
- Songwriters: Rakim Mayers; Anthony Lorenzo Holmes, Jr.; Gene McFadden; John Whitehead; Micah LeVar Troy; Victor Carstarphen
- Producer: Hitkidd

ASAP Rocky singles chronology
"Highjack" (2024)	"Tailor Swif" (2024)	"Ruby Rosary" (2024)

Music video
- "Tailor Swif" on YouTube

"Tailor Swif" is a song by American rapper ASAP Rocky, released on August 30, 2024. The song was intended as the second single from his upcoming fourth studio album, Don't Be Dumb; however, the song was not included on the album. Its music video was released the same day on YouTube. The song's title is a reference to the American singer-songwriter Taylor Swift.

== Background and release ==
The song was first previewed at ASAP Rocky's performance during Rolling Loud Portugal in July 2022, under the name "Wetty". The track, as well as its accompanying music video, would later leak online. In July 2023, ASAP Rocky performed the song once again at Rolling Loud Miami, referring to it as "Wetty (Taylor Swift)". The reference to singer Taylor Swift in the song's name generated significant discussion on social media. On August 29, 2024, Rocky announced the song as the second single for Don't Be Dumb, changing the name to "Tailor Swif".

== Music video ==
The music video for "Tailor Swif" was released on ASAP Rocky's YouTube channel on August 30, 2024. It was directed by Vania Heymann and Gal Muggia. The music video was shot in Kyiv, Ukraine in December 2021. The video was nominated for the Grammy Award for Best Music Video, though lost to the music video for Kendrick Lamar's "Not Like Us".

== Charts ==
Chart performance for "Tailor Swif"
Chart (2024)	Peak position
Canada Hot 100 (Billboard)	80
Global 200 (Billboard)	127
Latvia (LAIPA)	8
Lithuania (AGATA)	67
New Zealand Hot Singles (RMNZ)	2
Poland (Polish Streaming Top 100)	62
Switzerland (Schweizer Hitparade)	72
UK Video Streaming (Official Charts)	28
US Billboard Hot 100	84
US Hot R&B/Hip-Hop Songs (Billboard)	18
