= Fukk Sleep =

Song by ASAP Rocky featuring FKA Twigs

from the album Testing
- Released: May 25, 2018
- Recorded: 2018
- Genre: Hip-hop
- Length: 3:13
- Songwriters: Tahliah Barnett; Michael Burman; Hector Delgado; Albert Johnson; Gary Lucas; Rakim Mayers; Matthew Samuels; Michael Tyler
- Producers: Delgado; Lord Flacko; FnZ; Boi-1da

Music video
- "Fukk Sleep" on YouTube

"Fukk Sleep" is a song by American rapper ASAP Rocky featuring English singer FKA Twigs from the former's third studio album, Testing (2018). Produced by Hector Delgado, FnZ, Boi-1da, and Rocky (under the name Lord Flacko), the track was released in 2018 alongside the album. The song was later given a video, directed by Diana Kunst.

== Background ==
The song contains a sample of "FYM", written by Prodigy, Joyner Lucas, Boi-1da and Mystikal, as performed by Lucas. The song's writing credits reflect this, with Twigs and Rocky, as well as Michael Burman, Hector Delgado, Prodigy, Lucas, Boi-1da, and Mystikal being credited as writers. The song was produced by Delgado, Rocky, FnZ, and Boi-1da. Delgado provided background vocals and engineered and mixed the song. The song features keyboards by Andrew VanWyngarden.

== Promotion ==
=== Music video ===
Directed by Diana Kunst, the visual sees "Twigs and Rocky serve all of the looks while causing mayhem in the streets and then taking it elsewhere from a fancy restaurant to a grungy strip club." The video's production was handled by Object Animal and O Creative Studio.

The duo wore clothes designed by a range of high-fashion outlets such as Calvin Klein, Alexander Wang, Dior, and Versace, among others. Since its premiere on November 2, 2018, the video has received over 30 million views. Fellow rapper Kanye West praised the video on his Twitter. Tosten Burks of Spin likened the video to the film Blade Runner.

=== Live performances ===
The duo performed the song at Redbull's Music Festival in May 2019. Following the performance, Trace William Owen of Complex magazine praised the performance and said "[audiences] don't talk enough about 'Fukk Sleep'".

== Charts ==
Chart performance for "Fukk Sleep"
Chart (2019)	Peak position
Canada Hot 100 (Billboard)	89
New Zealand Heatseekers (RMNZ)	3
Switzerland (Schweizer Hitparade)	65
UK Singles (Official Charts)	99
US Bubbling Under Hot 100 (Billboard)	4
US Bubbling Under R&B/Hip-Hop Singles (Billboard)	2

== Certifications ==
Certifications for "Fukk Sleep"
Region	Certification	Certified units/sales
Canada (Music Canada)	Gold	40,000^{‡}
New Zealand (RMNZ)	Platinum	30,000^{‡}
Poland (ZPAV)	Platinum	50,000^{‡}
Portugal (AFP)	Gold	5,000^{‡}
United States (RIAA)	Gold	500,000^{‡}
^{‡} Sales+streaming figures based on certification alone.
