= Playa (ASAP Rocky song) =

2026 song by ASAP Rocky

Song by ASAP Rocky

from the album Don't Be Dumb
- Released: January 16, 2026
- Genre: Hip-hop; trap; cloud rap; psychedelic rap
- Length: 3:47
- Label: AWGE; ASAP; RCA
- Songwriters: Rakim Mayers; Ronald LaTour Jr.; Stephen Bruner; Luke Fenton; Troy Taylor; Edrick Miles; Tony E. Scales; Tremaine Neverson
- Producers: ASAP Rocky; Cardo Got Wings; Thundercat; Loukeman

"Playa" is a song by American rapper ASAP Rocky from his fourth studio album, Don't Be Dumb (2026). It was produced by Rocky himself, Cardo Got Wings and Thundercat, with additional production from Loukeman.

== Composition and lyrics ==
The song incorporates 1980s funk elements and "rolling 808s", while lyrically ASAP Rocky raps with braggadocio lyrics and centers around his contentment with his family life, referring to his girlfriend Rihanna and their children. He redefines the slang term "player" ("Takin' care of your kids, boy, that's player shit / One bitch, boy, that's player shit / No baby mama drama, no new friends, boy, that's player shit"), and emphasizes that one loyal spouse is more important than multiple sexual partners. The beat switches in the end.

== Critical reception ==
The song received generally positive reviews. Angel Diaz of Billboard placed it at number eight in a ranking of tracks from Don't Be Dumb. Alexander Cole of HotNewHipHop regarded the song as having one of the best beats from the album, adding "There is something otherworldly going on here. The sounds have a nostalgic quality to them; meanwhile, Rocky is delivering some catchy flows and is having a whole lot of fun. If you're a Rocky fan, this is probably one of the most interesting first listens you've had in quite some time." Complex's Dimas Sanfiorenzo considered the run from "Playa" to "Stop Snitching" among the album's "best material", commenting "Even when the subject matter is more mature—'Playa' is about being a family man—the music mostly feels like it could have come from a 2011 time capsule." Tom Breihan of Stereogum described the song as "a gurgly-smooth '80s-funk pastiche that makes Rocky sound impossibly cool", while Peter A. Berry of Variety called it an "aqueous bop". Consequence's Kiana Fitzgerald wrote that the song's beat switch "feel[s] distracting initially, but ultimately boost[s] the varied atmosphere of the album". Shaad D'Souza of The Guardian wrote "On the warm, dazed Playa, Rocky sounds positively avuncular, rapping as if he's giving advice to someone in love for the first time, though the advice is, admittedly, very specific and kind of callous: 'No receipts, don't text.'"

== Charts ==
Chart performance for "Playa"
Chart (2026)	Peak position
Canada Hot 100 (Billboard)	66
Global 200 (Billboard)	125
Greece International (IFPI)	62
Lithuania (AGATA)	50
Portugal (AFP)	181
US Billboard Hot 100	59
US Hot R&B/Hip-Hop Songs (Billboard)	18
