= Sauce Walka =

American rapper (born 1990)

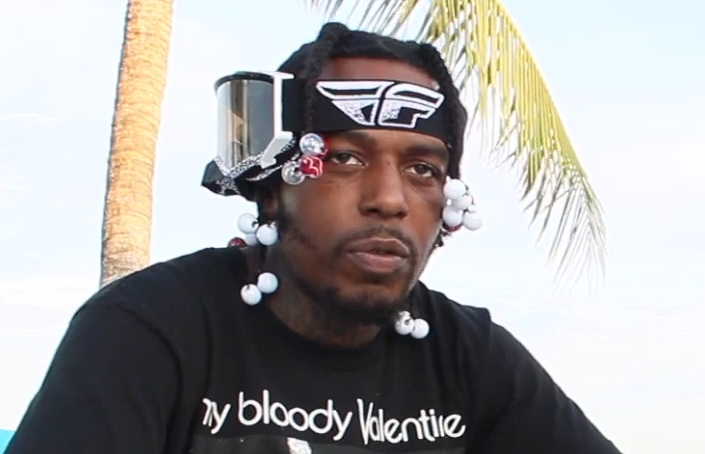
- Sauce Walka in August 2020

Background information
- Also known as: Sauce Father; Drip God; Sauce God; A-Walk
- Born: Albert Walker Mondane; June 29, 1990 (age 36)
- Origin: Houston, Texas, U.S.
- Genre: Southern hip-hop
- Occupations: Rapper; songwriter
- Years active: 2007–present
- Labels: The Sauce Factory; Brickmade; Daydrmrz; EMPIRE

Albert Walker Mondane (born June 29, 1990), known professionally as Sauce Walka, is an American rapper from Houston, Texas.

== Career ==
Sauce Walka started his rapping career in 2007 under the name A-Walk as part of a Houston rap group called Mostheard. He began releasing mixtapes as Sauce Walka in 2014, in the same year forming the duo Sauce Twinz with another rapper, Sancho Saucy. Sauce Walka credits himself with popularizing the modern usage of the hip-hop slang term "drip", a word he uses extensively throughout his lyrics. In 2015, he gained attention after releasing a "diss song" titled "Wack 2 Wack", targeted at the musician Drake, accusing him of culturally appropriating Houston hip-hop culture.

Sauce Walka has collaborated with rappers such as A$AP Rocky, Bun B, Chief Keef, Lil' Keke, Maxo Kream, Migos, Slim Thug, Travis Scott, Trinidad James and XXXTentacion.

=== The Sauce Factory ===
Sauce Walka founded the independent record label The Sauce Factory (TSF) in 2014. TSF has signed 5th Ward JP, Peso Peso, Rizzoo Rizzoo, Rodji Diego, and Sancho Saucy.

In 2025, Sauce Walka and his TSF Artist Sayso P were both shot. Sayso P was killed and Sauce Walka was injured in the leg. The vehicle used to transport the two shooters would be found. One suspected shooter, Jayden Dandridge, would be charged, only to be found shot to death soon afterwards. However, the second suspected shooter, Kevin Brown, was able to get charged for the shooting of Sayso P. and Sauce Walka as well.

== Personal life ==
=== Legal issues ===
Sauce Walka was one of several involved in a gun-related incident in summer 2009. Court records show that he pleaded guilty to deadly conduct after being charged with shooting and wounding a person during a concert hosted by Trae tha Truth at Texas Southern University, which resulted in him serving community supervision. In 2018, Houston Police told KPRC that he was involved in a criminal street gang called "Mash Mode" in 2009, at the time using the name "A-Walk".

In 2018, Texas state court documents described The Sauce Factory as a "documented gang" and "known for criminal activity". In response to the accusations, Sauce Walka said, "I'm going to keep rapping because I know I'm not a gang. I know we're not a gang, I know that I'm a record label, I know that I'm an artist [...] I'm not into gang activity or none of that stuff that's going on, I'm not worried about that, it's not what's going on."

In December 2023, he was arrested after driving more than 130 mph, and also evading Houston Police Department officers for a two mile chase. During the chase, Sauce Walka also got involved in a car wreck and was briefly hospitalized. He was initially released after posting a $15,000 bond, but was then sent back to prison after he was officially charged with evading arrest or detention, with a judge also increasing his bond to $35,000.

=== Political views ===
He supported Donald Trump's 2024 presidential campaign.

== Discography ==
=== Mixtapes ===
Title	Details
In Sauce We Trust (with Sancho Saucy as Sauce Twinz)	Released: November 24, 2014; Label: The Sauce Factory; Format: Digital download
Sorry 4 the Sauce	Released: February 24, 2015; Label: The Sauce Factory; Format: Digital download
Sauce Theft Auto: Splash Andreas (with Sancho Saucy and Sosamann)	Released: June 4, 2015; Label: The Sauce Factory; Format: Digital download
Sorry 4 the Sauce 2	Released: September 19, 2015; Label: The Sauce Factory; Format: Digital download
Don't Let the Sauce Fool U (with Sancho Saucy as Sauce Twinz)	Released: November 20, 2015; Label: The Sauce Factory; Format: Digital download
Holy Sauce	Released: May 26, 2016; Label: The Sauce Factory; Format: Digital download
Sorry 4 the Sauce 3	Released: December 21, 2016; Label: The Sauce Factory; Format: Digital download
The Saucefather	Released: June 5, 2017; Label: The Sauce Factory/Create Music Group; Format: Digital download
Drip God	Released: August 31, 2018; Label: The Sauce Factory/Create Music Group; Format: Digital download
Sauce Ghetto Gospel	Released: December 17, 2018; Label: The Sauce Factory/Create Music Group; Format: Digital download
New Sauce City	Released: August 7, 2019; Label: The Sauce Factory/Create Music Group; Format: Digital download
Sauce Ghetto Gospel 2	Released: December 6, 2019; Label: The Sauce Factory/Create Music Group; Format: Digital download
Lost in the Sauce (with Sancho Saucy as Sauce Twinz)	Released: April 3, 2020; Label: The Sauce Factory/Create Music Group; Format: Digital download
Sauce Train (with El Trainn)	Released: April 6, 2021; Label: The Sauce Factory/Create Music Group; Format: Digital download
Birdz Hunt Snakes	Released: April 7, 2021; Label: The Sauce Factory/Create Music Group; Format: Digital download
Sauce R&B	Released: April 8, 2021; Label: The Sauce Factory/Create Music Group; Format: Digital download
God of Texas	Released: April 9, 2021; Label: The Sauce Factory/Create Music Group; Format: Digital download
Drill Spill	Released: November 16, 2021; Label: The Sauce Factory/Create Music Group; Format: Digital download
Al Rage Walka	Released: June 10, 2022; Label: The Sauce Factory/Create Music Group; Format: Digital download
Sauce Beach Florida	Released: August 26, 2022; Label: The Sauce Factory/Create Music Group; Format: Digital download
Sauce Ghetto Gospel 3	Released: December 23, 2022; Label: The Sauce Factory/Empire; Format: Digital download
