= Kelvin Krash =

- Origin: London, England
- Genre: Hip-hop
- Label: AWGE

Kelvin Magnusen, known professionally as Kelvin Krash, is a British music producer. He is known for producing singles for American rapper ASAP Rocky, having previously done so for Swedish House Mafia.

== Career ==
He is from Willesden in North West London.

In 2018, he released his debut single "Council". He later created the song "Buck Shots" for ASAP Rocky featuring Playboi Carti and Smooky Margielaa. He later created the song and video for the single "TIME" by Kasein. He also became known on Reddit and worked with Swedish House Mafia. In 2019, he released an extended play titled, K2. He later released his songs "TIME" and "6FT UNDER" as singles. In 2022, he produced the song "Shittin' Me" for ASAP Rocky it was released as a single.

In 2023, he released his single "Promise You'll Wait", and debut album Harsh.

== Discography ==
=== Studio albums ===
- HARSH (2023)

=== EPs ===
- K2 (with Kasien) (2019)
