= ASAP Rocky discography =

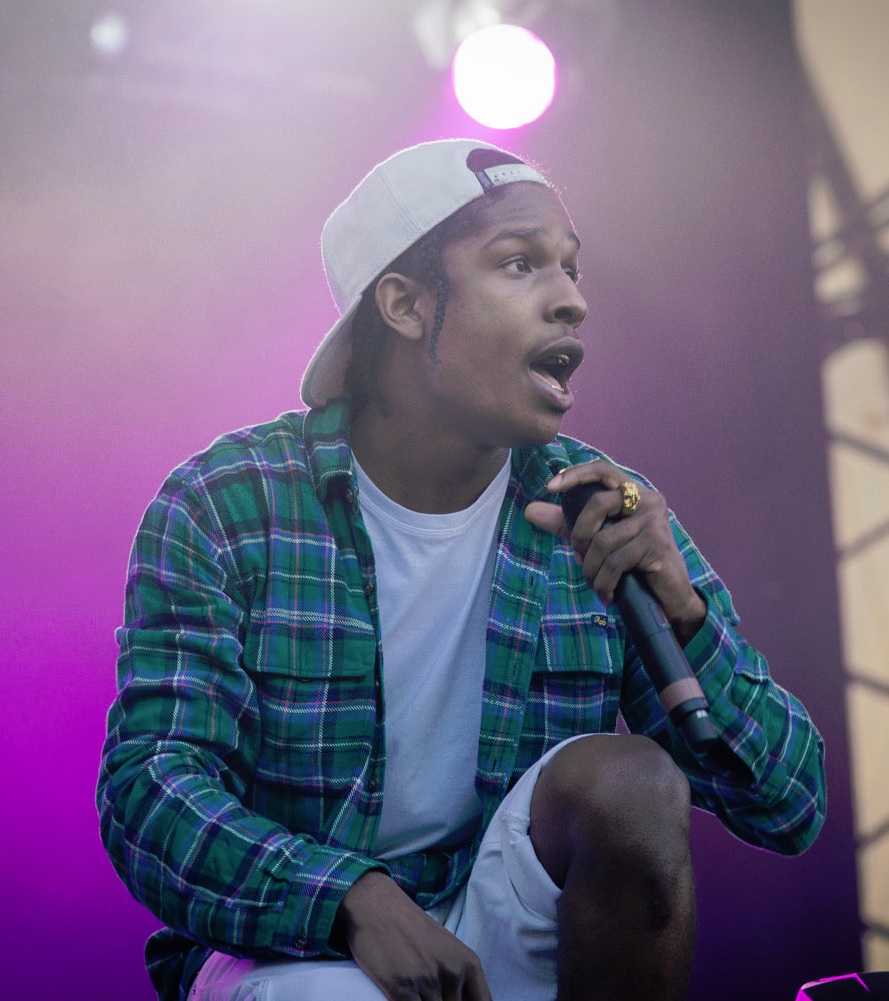
- Studio albums: 4
- Music videos: 43
- As lead artist: 17
- As featured artist: 25
- Promotional singles: 7
- Other charted songs: 26
- Mixtapes: 1

The discography of American rapper ASAP Rocky consists of four studio albums, one mixtape, 42 singles (including 25 as a featured artist), eight promotional singles and 43 music videos.

ASAP Rocky initially garnered mainstream attention after releasing his singles "Peso" and "Purple Swag" in summer 2011. Initially hesitant on signing to a major label, he eventually signed with record executive Bryan Leach's Polo Grounds Music (an imprint of RCA Records), after developing a close relationship with the fellow Harlem native. Both songs were included on his mixtape Live. Love. ASAP, released in October 2011 to critical acclaim. The record deal was unique as it allocated half its US$3 million sum Rocky's musical endeavors and the other half towards the development of his group, ASAP Mob. Rocky became notable for his music incorporating stylistic and production elements of East Coast hip hop and Southern hip hop, heavily utilizing the latter's woozy soundscapes, low/mid-tempo instrumentation, and chopped and screwed choruses. His lyrics dealt with themes about moral decay, including promiscuity and drug use, expressed through a boastful, tempered flow.

In January 2013, Rocky released his debut studio album, Long. Live. ASAP to critical and commercial success. It was preceded by the single "Fuckin' Problems" (featuring Drake, 2 Chainz and Kendrick Lamar), which peaked at number eight on the Billboard Hot 100. In 2015, he guest appeared on Selena Gomez's single "Good for You", which peaked at number five. Rocky is also known for his publicized romantic affair with Barbadian singer Rihanna, whom originally appeared in the music video for Rocky's 2013 single, "Fashion Killa".

== Albums ==
=== Studio albums ===
List of studio albums, with selected chart positions, sales figures and certifications
Title	Album details	Peak chart positions										Sales	Certifications
Title	Album details	US	US R&B /HH	US Rap	AUS	CAN	DEN	FRA	NZ	SWI	UK	Sales	Certifications
Long. Live. ASAP	Released: January 15, 2013; Label: ASAP Worldwide, Polo Grounds, RCA; Formats: CD, LP, digital download, streaming	1	1	1	7	1	4	21	7	9	7	US: 2,000,000	RIAA: 2× Platinum; ARIA: Gold; BPI: Gold; IFPI DEN: 2× Platinum; MC: Gold; RMNZ: Platinum
At. Long. Last. ASAP	Released: May 26, 2015; Label: ASAP Worldwide, Polo Grounds, RCA; Formats: CD, LP, digital download, streaming	1	1	1	5	1	4	42	6	5	10	US: 210,000	RIAA: 2× Platinum; ARIA: Gold; BPI: Gold; IFPI DEN: Platinum; MC: Platinum; RMNZ: Platinum
Testing	Released: May 25, 2018; Label: ASAP Worldwide, Polo Grounds, RCA; Formats: Digital download, streaming	4	3	3	5	3	3	93	4	4	11		RIAA: Gold; BPI: Silver; IFPI DEN: Platinum; MC: Gold
Don't Be Dumb	Released: January 16, 2026; Label: ASAP Worldwide / AWGE, RCA; Formats: CD, LP, cassette, digital download, streaming	1	1	1	5	2	2	14	4	1	8		

== Mixtapes ==
List of mixtapes, with selected chart positions
Title	Mixtape details	Peak chart positions					
Title	Mixtape details	US	US R&B /HH	US Rap	AUS	CAN	SWI
Live. Love. ASAP	Released: October 31, 2011; Re-released: October 29, 2021; Label: ASAP Worldwide, Polo Grounds, RCA; Formats: CD, digital download, streaming	43	22	20	51	45	31

== Singles ==
=== As lead artist ===
List of singles as lead artist, with selected chart positions and certifications, showing year released and album name
Title	Year	Peak chart positions										Certifications	Album
Title	Year	US	US R&B /HH	US Rap	AUS	CAN	DEN	FRA	NZ	SWI	UK	Certifications	Album
"Peso"	2011	—	75	—	—	—	—	—	—	—	—	RIAA: Platinum; MC: Gold; RMNZ: Gold	Live. Love. ASAP
"Purple Swag"	2011	—	—	—	—	—	—	—	—	—	—	RIAA: Gold	Live. Love. ASAP
"Goldie"	2012	—	55	—	—	—	—	—	—	—	98	RIAA: 2× Platinum; BPI: Silver; RMNZ: Platinum	Long. Live. ASAP
"Fuckin' Problems" (featuring Drake, 2 Chainz, and Kendrick Lamar)	2012	8	2	2	78	65	—	30	—	65	50	RIAA: 8× Platinum; ARIA: 3× Platinum; BPI: Platinum; IFPI DEN: Platinum; MC: Platinum; RMNZ: 4× Platinum	Long. Live. ASAP
"Wild for the Night" (featuring Skrillex and Birdy Nam Nam)	2013	80	26	17	—	65	—	169	38	—	43	RIAA: 2× Platinum; ARIA: Platinum; BPI: Silver; IFPI DEN: Platinum; MC: Platinum; RMNZ: 2× Platinum	Long. Live. ASAP
"Fashion Killa"	2013	—	46	—	—	—	—	—	—	—	80	RIAA: Platinum; BPI: Gold; RMNZ: 3× Platinum	Long. Live. ASAP
"Multiply" (featuring Juicy J)	2014	—	49	—	—	—	—	—	—	—	184	RIAA: Gold	Non-album single
"Lord Pretty Flacko Jodye 2 (LPFJ2)"	2015	— (Note: "Lord Pretty Flacko Jodye 2 (LPFJ2)" did not enter the Billboard Hot 100, but peaked at number one on the Bubbling Under Hot 100 chart.)	37	—	—	—	—	—	—	—	—	RIAA: 3× Platinum; BPI: Silver; MC: Platinum; RMNZ: Platinum	At. Long. Last. ASAP
"Everyday" (featuring Rod Stewart, Miguel, and Mark Ronson)	2015	92	31	23	49	87	—	192	—	—	56	RIAA: 3× Platinum; ARIA: Platinum; BPI: Platinum; IFPI DEN: Gold; MC: 2× Platinum; RMNZ: 3× Platinum	At. Long. Last. ASAP
"LSD"	2015	62	20	—	83	79	—	138	—	—	— (Note: "LSD" did not enter the UK Singles Chart, but peaked at number 24 on the UK Hip Hop and R&B Singles Chart.)	RIAA: 4× Platinum; ARIA: Platinum; BPI: Gold; IFPI DEN: Gold; MC: Platinum; RMNZ: 2× Platinum	At. Long. Last. ASAP
"Cocky" (with Gucci Mane and 21 Savage featuring London on da Track)	2018	—	—	—	—	83	—	—	—	—	—		The Uncle Drew Motion Picture Soundtrack
"Bad Company" (featuring BlocBoy JB)	2018	— (Note: "Bad Company" did not enter the Billboard Hot 100, but peaked at number one on the Bubbling Under Hot 100 Singles chart.)	47	—	—	68	—	—	—	—	—	RIAA: Gold	Non-album single
"ASAP Forever" (featuring Moby)	2018	63	31	25	72	41	—	95	35	45	60	RIAA: Platinum; ARIA: Platinum; BPI: Silver; MC: Platinum; RMNZ: Platinum	Testing
"Praise the Lord (Da Shine)" (featuring Skepta)	2018	45	22	16	33	22	16	41	11	14	18	RIAA: 4× Platinum; ARIA: 3× Platinum; BPI: 2× Platinum; IFPI DEN: 2× Platinum; IFPI SWI: Gold; MC: 3× Platinum; RMNZ: 7× Platinum; SNEP: Diamond	Testing
"Potato Salad" (with Tyler, the Creator)	2018	—	—	—	—	—	—	—	—	—	—	RIAA: Platinum; BPI: Silver; RMNZ: Platinum	Non-album singles
"Sundress"	2018	— (Note: "Sundress" did not enter the Billboard Hot 100, but peaked at number 3 on the Bubbling Under Hot 100 chart.)	—	—	—	72	—	—	— (Note: "Sundress" did not enter the NZ Top 40 Singles Chart, but peaked at number four on the NZ Hot Singles Chart.)	—	— (Note: "Sundress" did not enter the UK Singles Chart, but peaked at number 20 on the UK Hip Hop and R&B Singles Chart.)	RIAA: Platinum; ARIA: Gold; BPI: Platinum; IFPI DEN: Gold; RMNZ: 3× Platinum	Non-album singles
"Runnin" (with Mike Will Made It, ASAP Ferg, and Nicki Minaj)	2019	—	—	—	—	—	—	—	—	—	—		Creed II: The Album
"Energy" (with Burns and Sabrina Claudio)	2019	—	—	—	—	—	—	—	—	—	—		Non-album singles
"Live Fast" (with Alan Walker)	2019	—	—	—	—	—	—	—	—	—	—		Non-album singles
"Babushka Boi"	2019	69	27	24	60	48	—	—	39	66	89	RIAA: Gold; MC: Gold; RMNZ: Gold	Non-album singles
"Mazza" (with Slowthai)	2021	—	—	—	—	—	—	—	—	—	72		Tyron
"Arya" (with Nigo)	2022	—	—	—	—	—	—	—	— (Note: "Arya" did not enter the NZ Top 40 Singles Chart, but peaked at number eight on the NZ Hot Singles Chart.)	—	—		I Know Nigo!
"Doja" (with $not)	2022	87	30	20	—	67	—	—	— (Note: "Doja" did not enter the NZ Top 40 Singles Chart, but peaked at number four on the NZ Hot Singles Chart.)	—	—		Ethereal
"The God Hour" (with ASAP Ant)	2022	—	—	—	—	—	—	—	—	—	—		Lil Black Jean Jacket 3
"D.M.B."	2022	— (Note: "D.M.B." did not enter the Billboard Hot 100, but peaked at number two on the Bubbling Under Hot 100 chart.)	32	—	—	70	—	—	— (Note: "D.M.B." did not enter the NZ Top 40 Singles Chart, but peaked at number 10 on the NZ Hot Singles Chart.)	—	—		Non-album singles
"Shittin' Me"	2022	—	—	—	—	—	—	—	— (Note: "Shittin' Me" did not enter the NZ Top 40 Singles Chart, but peaked at number 25 on the NZ Hot Singles Chart.)	—	—		Non-album singles
"Same Problems?"	2023	—	—	—	—	—	—	—	— (Note: "Same Problems?" did not enter the NZ Top 40 Singles Chart, but peaked at number 33 on the NZ Hot Singles Chart.)	—	—		Non-album singles
"Riot (Rowdy Pipe'n)" (with Pharrell Williams)	2023	—	36	—	—	—	—	—	— (Note: "Riot (Rowdy Pipe'n)" did not enter the NZ Top 40 Singles Chart, but peaked at number 20 on the NZ Hot Singles Chart.)	—	—		Non-album singles
"I Smoked Away My Brain (I'm God x Demons Mashup)" (featuring Imogen Heap and Clams Casino)	2023	— (Note: "I Smoked Away My Brain (I'm God x Demons Mashup)" did not enter the Billboard Hot 100, but peaked at number 13 on the Bubbling Under Hot 100 chart.)	35	—	—	74	—	—	—	—	80	RIAA: 2× Platinum; BPI: Silver; RMNZ: Platinum	Don't Be Dumb (Digital Bonus)
"Gangsta" (with Free Nationals and Anderson .Paak)	2024	—	—	—	—	—	—	—	— (Note: "Riot (Rowdy Pipe'n)" did not enter the NZ Top 40 Singles Chart, but peaked at number 12 on the NZ Hot Singles Chart.)	—	—		Non-album singles
"Highjack" (featuring Jessica Pratt)	2024	89	26	23	—	—	—	—	— (Note: "Highjack" did not enter the NZ Top 40 Singles Chart, but peaked at number six on the NZ Hot Singles Chart.)	—	—		Non-album singles
"Tailor Swif"	2024	84	18	17	—	80	—	—	— (Note: "Tailor Swif" did not enter the NZ Top 40 Singles Chart, but peaked at number two on the NZ Hot Singles Chart.)	72	—		Non-album singles
"Ruby Rosary" (featuring J. Cole)	2024	85	22	21	—	92	—	—	— (Note: "Ruby Rosary" did not enter the NZ Top 40 Singles Chart, but peaked at number five on the NZ Hot Singles Chart.)	—	—		Non-album singles
"Pray4DaGang" (featuring KayCyy)	2025	—	—	—	—	—	—	—	—	—	—		Non-album singles
"Punk Rocky"	2026	56	—	9	—	56	—	—	— (Note: "Punk Rocky" did not enter the NZ Top 40 Singles Chart, but peaked at number 6 on the NZ Hot Singles Chart.)	62	87		Don't Be Dumb
"Helicopter"	2026	24	8	4	54	31	—	—	— (Note: "Helicopter" did not enter the NZ Top 40 Singles Chart, but peaked at number 4 on the NZ Hot Singles Chart.)	24	42		Don't Be Dumb
"Shroom Clouds" (featuring Reggie and Jeremih)	2026	—	42	—	—	—	—	—	— (Note: "Shroom Clouds" did not enter the NZ Top 40 Singles Chart, but peaked at number 27 on the NZ Hot Singles Chart.)	—	—		Don't Be Dumb – Disc 2
"—" denotes a recording that did not chart or was not released in that territory

=== As featured artist ===
List of singles as featured artist, with selected chart positions, showing year released and album name
Title	Year	Peak chart positions										Certifications	Album
Title	Year	US	US R&B /HH	AUS	CAN	DEN	FRA	NOR	NZ	SWE	UK	Certifications	Album
"Street Knock" (Swizz Beatz featuring ASAP Rocky)	2012	—	—	—	—	—	—	—	—	—	—		Non-album single
"Hands on the Wheel" (Schoolboy Q featuring ASAP Rocky)	2012	—	— (Note: "Hands on the Wheel" did not enter the Billboard Hot R&B/Hip-Hop Songs chart, but peaked at number five on the Bubbling Under R&B/Hip-Hop Singles chart.)	—	—	—	—	—	—	—	—	RIAA: Gold; RMNZ: Platinum	Habits & Contradictions
"Cockiness (Love It) (Remix)" (Rihanna featuring ASAP Rocky)	2012	— (Note: "Cockiness (Love It)" (Remix) did not enter the Billboard Hot 100, but peaked at number two on the Bubbling Under Hot 100 Singles chart.)	— (Note: "Cockiness (Love It)" (Remix) did not enter the Hot R&B/Hip-Hop Songs chart, but peaked at number one on the Bubbling Under R&B/Hip-Hop Singles chart.)	—	—	—	—	—	—	—	—		Talk That Talk
"Yellow Tape" (Fat Joe featuring Lil Wayne, ASAP Rocky, and French Montana)	2012	—	— (Note: "Yellow Tape" did not enter the Hot R&B/Hip-Hop Songs chart, but peaked at number seven on the Bubbling Under R&B/Hip-Hop Singles chart.)	—	—	—	—	—	—	—	—		Non-album single
"Work (Remix)" (ASAP Ferg featuring ASAP Rocky, French Montana, Trinidad James, and Schoolboy Q)	2013	—	—	—	—	—	—	—	—	—	—	RIAA: 3× Platinum	Trap Lord
"Shabba" (ASAP Ferg featuring ASAP Rocky)	2013	— (Note: "Shabba" did not enter the Billboard Hot 100, but peaked at number seven on the Bubbling Under Hot 100 Singles chart.)	34	—	—	—	—	—	—	—	—	RIAA: 2× Platinum; RMNZ: Platinum	Trap Lord
"Choppa" (Joey Fatts featuring ASAP Rocky and Danny Brown)	2013	—	—	—	—	—	—	—	—	—	—		Chipper Jones Vol. 2
"Pretend" (Tinashe featuring ASAP Rocky)	2014	— (Note: "Pretend" did not enter the Billboard Hot 100, but peaked at number 17 on the Bubbling Under Hot 100 Singles chart.)	34	—	—	—	—	—	—	—	— (Note: "Pretend" did not enter the UK Single Top 100, but peaked at number 36 on the UK R&B Singles chart.)		Aquarius
"Hella Hoes" (ASAP Mob featuring ASAP Rocky, ASAP Ferg, ASAP Nast, and ASAP Twelvyy)	2014	—	— (Note: "Hella Hoes" did not enter the Hot R&B/Hip-Hop Songs chart, but peaked at number ten on the Bubbling Under R&B/Hip-Hop Singles chart.)	—	—	—	—	—	—	—	—	RIAA: Gold	Non-album single
"Good for You" (Selena Gomez featuring ASAP Rocky)	2015	5	—	10	8	11	14	9	14	24	23	RIAA: 3× Platinum; ARIA: 5× Platinum; BPI: Platinum; IFPI DEN: 2× Platinum; IFPI SWE: 2× Platinum; MC: 2× Platinum; RMNZ: 2× Platinum	Revival
"Where Is the Love?" (The Black Eyed Peas featuring various artists)	2016	—	—	15	—	—	—	—	— (Note: "#Wheresthelove" did not enter the NZ Top 40 Singles Chart, but peaked at number three on the NZ Heatseekers Singles Chart.)	—	47		Non-album single
"Lovesick" (Mura Masa featuring ASAP Rocky)	2016	—	—	14	—	20	—	—	13	65	59	RIAA: Gold; ARIA: 2× Platinum; BPI: Platinum; MC: Platinum; RMNZ: 5× Platinum; IFPI DEN: Platinum	Mura Masa
"R.I.P. Yams" (SpaceGhostPurrp featuring ASAP Rocky)	2016	—	—	—	—	—	—	—	—	—	—		Non-album single
"Blended Family (What You Do for Love)" (Alicia Keys featuring ASAP Rocky)	2016	—	— (Note: "Blended Family" did not enter the Hot R&B/Hip-Hop Songs chart, but peaked at number eight on the Bubbling Under R&B/Hip-Hop Singles chart.)	—	—	—	62	—	—	85	—		Here
"Said n Done" (French Montana featuring ASAP Rocky)	2016	—	—	—	—	—	—	—	—	—	—		MC4
"Telephone Calls" (ASAP Mob featuring ASAP Rocky, Tyler, the Creator, Playboi Carti, and Yung Gleesh)	2016	—	— (Note: "Telephone Calls" did not enter the Hot R&B/Hip-Hop Songs chart, but peaked at number ten on the Bubbling Under R&B/Hip-Hop Singles chart.)	—	—	—	—	—	—	—	—	RIAA: Gold	Cozy Tapes Vol. 1: Friends
"Gilligan" (DRAM featuring ASAP Rocky and Juicy J)	2017	—	—	—	—	—	—	—	—	—	—		Big Baby DRAM
"Wrong" (ASAP Mob featuring ASAP Rocky and ASAP Ferg)	2017	—	—	—	—	—	—	—	—	—	—		Cozy Tapes Vol. 2
"Feels So Good" (ASAP Mob featuring ASAP Rocky, ASAP Ferg, ASAP Nast, ASAP Twelvyy, and ASAP Ant)	2017	—	—	—	—	—	—	—	—	—	—		Cozy Tapes Vol. 2
"Raf" (ASAP Mob featuring ASAP Rocky, Playboi Carti, Quavo, Lil Uzi Vert, and Frank Ocean)	2017	— (Note: "RAF" did not enter the Billboard Hot 100, but peaked at number 18 on the Bubbling Under Hot 100 Singles chart.)	— (Note: "RAF" did not enter the Hot R&B/Hip-Hop Songs chart, but peaked at number ten on the Bubbling Under R&B/Hip-Hop Singles chart.)	—	82	—	—	—	— (Note: RAF did not enter the NZ Top 40, but charted at number five on the NZ Heatseekers chart.)	—	—	RIAA: Platinum; ARIA: Gold; RMNZ: Gold	Cozy Tapes Vol. 2
"Who Dat Boy" (Tyler, the Creator featuring ASAP Rocky)	2017	87	36	92	60	—	—	—	— (Note: Who Dat Boy did not enter the NZ Top 40, but charted at number two on the NZ Heatseekers chart.)	—	93	RIAA: 2x Platinum	Flower Boy
"Summer Bummer" (Lana Del Rey featuring ASAP Rocky and Playboi Carti)	2017	— (Note: "Summer Bummer" did not enter the Billboard Hot 100, but peaked at number 23 on the Bubbling Under Hot 100 Singles chart.)	—	—	80	—	133	—	—	—	81	RIAA: Gold; ARIA: Gold	Lust for Life
"Groupie Love" (Lana Del Rey featuring ASAP Rocky)	2017	—	—	—	—	—	141	—	—	—	—		Lust for Life
"East Coast (Remix)" (ASAP Ferg featuring Busta Rhymes, ASAP Rocky, Dave East, French Montana, Rick Ross, and Snoop Dogg)	2017	—	—	—	—	—	—	—	—	—	—		Still Striving
"No Limit" (G-Eazy featuring ASAP Rocky and Cardi B)	2017	4	2	43	7	—	—	—	21	57	45	RIAA: 7× Platinum; ARIA: Platinum; BPI: Gold; MC: 4× Platinum; RMNZ: 3× Platinum	The Beautiful & Damned
"Pick It Up" (Famous Dex featuring ASAP Rocky)	2017	54	26	—	60	—	—	—	—	—	—	RIAA: 2× Platinum; BPI: Silver; RMNZ: Platinum	Dex Meets Dexter
"Doja Sweet" (Killa Kyleon featuring ASAP Rocky and Bun B)	2018	—	—	—	—	—	—	—	—	—	—		Candy Paint N Texas Plates
"Flight to Memphis" (Smooky MarGielaa featuring Chris Brown, Juicy J, and A$AP Rocky)	2018	—	—	—	—	—	—	—	—	—	—		MarGielaa Mad Man
"Pups" (A$AP Ferg featuring A$AP Rocky)	2019	—	—	—	—	—	—	—	—	—	—		Floor Seats
"Twisted" (French Montana featuring Juicy J, Logic, and ASAP Rocky)	2019	—	—	—	—	—	—	—	—	—	—		Montana
"Count on Me" (Brockhampton featuring ASAP Rocky, SoGone SoFlexy, Ryan Beatty, and Shawn Mendes)	2021	—	—	—	—	—	—	—	—	—	—		Roadrunner: New Light, New Machine
"Stoozy" (Dean Blunt featuring ASAP Rocky)	2021	—	—	—	—	—	—	—	—	—			Non-album single
"—" denotes a recording that did not chart or was not released in that territory.

=== Promotional singles ===
List of promotional singles, with selected chart positions, showing year released and album name
Title	Year	Peak chart positions				Certifications	Album
Title	Year	US	US R&B /HH	US Rap	NZ Hot	Certifications	Album
"4 Loko" (Remix) (Smoke DZA featuring ASAP Rocky, ASAP Twelvyy, Danny Brown, Killa Kyleon and Freeway)	2012	—	—	—	—		Sweet Baby Kushed God
"Long Live ASAP"	2013	86	27	21	—	RIAA: Gold	Long. Live. ASAP
"U.O.E.N.O." (Remix) (Rocko featuring Future and ASAP Rocky)	2013	—	—	—	—		Non-album singles
"I'm Not the Only One" (Remix) (Sam Smith featuring ASAP Rocky)	2014	—	—	—	—		Non-album singles
"M's" (solo or featuring Lil Wayne)	2015	— (Note: "M'$" did not enter the Billboard Hot 100, but peaked at number six on the Bubbling Under Hot 100 Singles chart.)	41	—	—	RIAA: Gold	At. Long. Last. ASAP
"Whiskey" (Maroon 5 featuring ASAP Rocky)	2017	—	—	—	—		Red Pill Blues
"Handgun" (YG featuring ASAP Rocky)	2018	98	43	—	—		Stay Dangerous
"Trunks"	2025	—	—	—	23		Highest 2 Lowest
"Both Eyes Closed"	2025	—	—	—	39		Highest 2 Lowest
"—" denotes a recording that did not chart.

== Other charted songs ==
List of songs, with selected chart positions, showing year released and album name
Title	Year	Peak chart positions									Certifications	Album
Title	Year	US	US R&B /HH	US Rap	CAN	LAT Stream.	LTU	NZ	SWI	UK	Certifications	Album
"Hot Thing" (Usher featuring ASAP Rocky)	2012	—	— (Note: "Hot Thing" did not enter the Hot R&B/Hip-Hop Songs chart, but peaked at number three on the Bubbling Under R&B/Hip-Hop Singles chart.)	—	—	*	—	—	—	—		Looking 4 Myself
"Wildside" (T.I. featuring ASAP Rocky)	2012	—	— (Note: "Wildside" did not enter the Hot R&B/Hip-Hop Songs chart, but peaked at number five on the Bubbling Under R&B/Hip-Hop Singles chart.)	—	—	*	—	—	—	—		Trouble Man: Heavy Is the Head
"PMW (All I Really Need)" (featuring Schoolboy Q)	2013	— (Note: "PMW (All I Really Need)" did not enter the Billboard Hot 100, but peaked at number 14 on the Bubbling Under Hot 100 Singles chart.)	39	—	—	*	—	—	—	—	RIAA: Gold	Long. Live. ASAP
"LVL"	2013	—	50	—	—	*	69	—	—	—	RIAA: Platinum; RMNZ: Gold	Long. Live. ASAP
"Hell" (featuring Santigold)	2013	—	— (Note: "Hell" did not enter the Hot R&B/Hip-Hop Songs chart, but peaked at number three on the Bubbling Under R&B/Hip-Hop Singles chart.)	—	—	*	—	—	—	—		Long. Live. ASAP
"Pain" (featuring OverDoz)	2013	—	— (Note: "Pain" did not enter the Hot R&B/Hip-Hop Songs chart, but peaked at number five on the Bubbling Under R&B/Hip-Hop Singles chart.)	—	—	*	—	—	—	—		Long. Live. ASAP
"1 Train" (featuring Kendrick Lamar, Joey Badass, Yelawolf, Danny Brown, Action Bronson and Big K.R.I.T.)	2013	— (Note: "1 Train" did not enter the Billboard Hot 100, but peaked at number three on the Bubbling Under Hot 100 Singles chart.)	31	25	—	*	—	—	—	—	RIAA: Gold; RMNZ: Gold	Long. Live. ASAP
"Phoenix"	2013	—	— (Note: "Phoenix" did not enter the Hot R&B/Hip-Hop Songs chart, but peaked at number two on the Bubbling Under R&B/Hip-Hop Singles chart.)	—	—	*	—	—	—		RIAA: Gold	Long. Live. ASAP
"Suddenly"	2013	—	— (Note: "Suddenly" did not enter the Hot R&B/Hip-Hop Songs chart, but peaked at number nine on the Bubbling Under R&B/Hip-Hop Singles chart.)	—	—	*	—	—	—	—		Long. Live. ASAP
"Ghetto Symphony" (featuring Gunplay and ASAP Ferg)	2013	—	— (Note: "Ghetto Symphony" did not enter the Hot R&B/Hip-Hop Songs chart, but peaked at number two on the Bubbling Under R&B/Hip-Hop Singles chart.)	—	—	*	—	—	—	—	RIAA: Gold	Long. Live. ASAP
"I Come Apart" (featuring Florence Welch)	2013	—	— (Note: "I Come Apart" did not enter the Hot R&B/Hip-Hop Songs chart, but peaked at number one on the Bubbling Under R&B/Hip-Hop Singles chart.)	—	—	*	—	—	—	—		Long. Live. ASAP
"Brothers" (Kid Cudi featuring King Chip and ASAP Rocky)	2013	—	— (Note: "Brothers" did not enter the Hot R&B/Hip-Hop Songs chart, but peaked at number six on the Bubbling Under R&B/Hip-Hop Singles chart.)	—	—	*	—	—	—	—		Indicud
"Scholarship" (Juicy J featuring ASAP Rocky)	2013	—	— (Note: "Scholarship" did not enter the Hot R&B/Hip-Hop Songs chart, but peaked at number two on the Bubbling Under R&B/Hip-Hop Singles chart.)	—	—	*	—	—	—	—		Stay Trippy
"Holy Ghost" (featuring Joe Fox)	2015	—	— (Note: "Holy Ghost" did not enter the Hot R&B/Hip-Hop Songs chart, but peaked at number three on the Bubbling Under R&B/Hip-Hop Singles chart.)	—	—	*	—	—	—	—		At. Long. Last. ASAP
"Canal St." (featuring Bones)	2015	— (Note: "Canal St." did not enter the Billboard Hot 100, but peaked at number four on the Bubbling Under Hot 100 Singles chart.)	39	—	—	*	—	—	—	—	RIAA: Platinum; MC: Gold; RMNZ: Gold	At. Long. Last. ASAP
"Fine Whine" (featuring Future, Joe Fox and M.I.A.)	2015	—	— (Note: "Fine Wine" did not enter the Hot R&B/Hip-Hop Songs chart, but peaked at number six on the Bubbling Under R&B/Hip-Hop Singles chart.)	—	—	*	—	—	—	—	RIAA: Gold	At. Long. Last. ASAP
"Excuse Me"	2015	— (Note: "Excuse Me" did not enter the Billboard Hot 100, but peaked at number 24 on the Bubbling Under Hot 100 Singles chart.)	— (Note: "Excuse Me" did not enter the Hot R&B/Hip-Hop Songs chart, but peaked at number one on the Bubbling Under R&B/Hip-Hop Singles chart.)	—	—	*	—	—	—	—	RIAA: Platinum	At. Long. Last. ASAP
"JD"	2015	—	— (Note: "JD" did not enter the Hot R&B/Hip-Hop Songs chart, but peaked at number nine on the Bubbling Under R&B/Hip-Hop Singles chart.)	—	—	*	—	—	—	—		At. Long. Last. ASAP
"Electric Body" (featuring Schoolboy Q)	2015	80	27	21	—	*	—	—	—	—	RIAA: Platinum; MC: Gold; RMNZ: Gold	At. Long. Last. ASAP
"Jukebox Joints" (featuring Kanye West and Joe Fox)	2015	—	— (Note: "Jukebox Joints" did not enter the Hot R&B/Hip-Hop Songs chart, but peaked at number seven on the Bubbling Under R&B/Hip-Hop Singles chart.)	—	—	*	—	—	—	—	RIAA: Platinum; BPI: Silver; RMNZ: Gold	At. Long. Last. ASAP
"Max B" (featuring Joe Fox)	2015	—	— (Note: "Max B" did not enter the Hot R&B/Hip-Hop Songs chart, but peaked at number ten on the Bubbling Under R&B/Hip-Hop Singles chart.)	—	—	*	—	—	—	—		At. Long. Last. ASAP
"Wavybone" (featuring Juicy J and UGK)	2015	—	— (Note: "Wavybone" did not enter the Hot R&B/Hip-Hop Songs chart, but peaked at number four on the Bubbling Under R&B/Hip-Hop Singles chart.)	—	—	*	—	—	—	—		At. Long. Last. ASAP
"Fukk Sleep" (featuring FKA Twigs)	2018	— (Note: "Fukk Sleep" did not enter the Billboard Hot 100, but peaked at number four on the Bubbling Under Hot 100 Singles chart.)	— (Note: "Fukk Sleep" did not enter the Hot R&B/Hip-Hop Songs chart, but peaked at number two on the Bubbling Under R&B/Hip-Hop Singles chart.)	—	89	*	—	— (Note: "Fukk Sleep" did not enter the NZ Top 40 Singles Chart, but peaked at number two on the NZ Heatseeker Singles Chart.)	65	99	RIAA: Gold; MC: Gold; RMNZ: Gold	Testing
"Distorted Records"	2018	— (Note: "Distorted Records" did not enter the Billboard Hot 100, but peaked at number 16 on the Bubbling Under Hot 100 Singles chart.)	— (Note: "Distorted Records" did not enter the Hot R&B/Hip-Hop Songs chart, but peaked at number 10 on the Bubbling Under R&B/Hip-Hop Singles chart.)	—	—	*	—	— (Note: "Distorted Records" did not enter the NZ Top 40 Singles Chart, but peaked at number five on the NZ Heatseeker Singles Chart.)	—	—		Testing
"Tony Tone"	2018	— (Note: "Tony Tone" did not enter the Billboard Hot 100, but peaked at number 11 on the Bubbling Under Hot 100 Singles chart.)	— (Note: "Tony Tone" did not enter the Hot R&B/Hip-Hop Songs chart, but peaked at number six on the Bubbling Under R&B/Hip-Hop Singles chart.)	—	—	*	—	—	—	—		Testing
"Buck Shots"	2018	— (Note: "Buck Shots" did not enter the Billboard Hot 100, but peaked at number 22 on the Bubbling Under Hot 100 Singles chart.)	—	—	—	*	—	—	—	—		Testing
"Purity" (featuring Frank Ocean)	2018	—	—	—	—	*	—	—	—	—	RIAA: Gold; RMNZ: Gold	Testing
"T.D" (Lil Yachty and Tierra Whack featuring ASAP Rocky and Tyler, the Creator)	2020	83	34	—	—	*	—	— (Note: "T.D" did not enter the NZ Top 40 Singles Chart, but peaked at number 11 on the NZ Hot Singles Chart.)	—	—	RIAA: Gold	Lil Boat 3
"Telo$"	2020	—	—	—	—	*	—	—	—	—		Cyberpunk 2077 fictional radio station 101.9 The Dirg
"Rich Nigga Problems"	2021	—	—	—	—	*	—	— (Note: "Rich Nigga Problems" did not enter the NZ Top 40 Singles Chart, but peaked at number seven on the NZ Hot Singles Chart.)	—	—		Judas and the Black Messiah: The Inspired Album
"Bankroll" (Brockhampton featuring ASAP Rocky and ASAP Ferg)	2021	—	—	—	—	*	—	11	—	—		Roadrunner: New Light, New Machine
"Livin It Up" (with Young Thug and Post Malone)	2021	68	—	—	62	*	—	— (Note: "Livin It Up" did not enter the NZ Top 40 Singles Chart, but peaked at number eight on the NZ Hot Singles Chart.)	—	—	RMNZ: Gold	Punk
"Sandman"	2021	—	—	—	—	*	—	— (Note: "Sandman" did not enter the NZ Top 40 Singles Chart, but peaked at number 13 on the NZ Hot Singles Chart.)	—	—		Live. Love. ASAP
"Wave Gods" (with Nas and DJ Premier)	2021	—	—	—	—	*	—	— (Note: "Wave Gods" did not enter the NZ Top 40 Singles Chart, but peaked at number 21 on the NZ Hot Singles Chart.)	—	—		Magic
"Feel the Fiyaaaah" (with Metro Boomin featuring Takeoff)	2022	59	23	17	52	*	—	—	—	—		Heroes & Villains
"Am I Dreaming" (with Metro Boomin and Roisee)	2023	51	17	11	28	—	—	16	—	51	ARIA: Platinum; BPI: Silver; RMNZ: Gold	Spider-Man: Across the Spider-Verse (Soundtrack from and Inspired by the Motion Picture)
"Nonviolent Communication" (with Metro Boomin, James Blake, and 21 Savage)	2023	— (Note: "Nonviolent Communication" did not enter the Billboard Hot 100, but peaked at number 25 on the Bubbling Under Hot 100 Singles chart.)	—	—	—	—	—	—	—	—		Spider-Man: Across the Spider-Verse (Soundtrack from and Inspired by the Motion Picture)
"Wow" (with Kid Cudi)	2024	—	—	—	—	—	— (Note: "Wow" did not enter the NZ Top 40 Singles Chart, but peaked at number 18 on the NZ Hot Singles Chart.)	—	—	—		Insano
"Show of Hands" (with Future and Metro Boomin)	2024	71	30	—	71	—	—	— (Note: "Show of Hands" did not enter the NZ Top 40 Singles Chart, but peaked at number 10 on the NZ Hot Singles Chart.)	—	—		We Still Don't Trust You
"Order of Protection"	2026	54	16	10	59	15	38	— (Note: "Order of Protection" did not enter the NZ Top 40 Singles Chart, but peaked at number 5 on the NZ Hot Singles Chart.)	—	—		Don't Be Dumb
"Stole Ya Flow"	2026	33	11	7	40	3	18	— (Note: "Stole Ya Flow" did not enter the NZ Top 40 Singles Chart, but peaked at number 3 on the NZ Hot Singles Chart.)	—	59		Don't Be Dumb
"Stay Here 4 Life" (featuring Brent Faiyaz)	2026	23	7	3	33	4	17	— (Note: "Stay Here 4 Life" did not enter the NZ Top 40 Singles Chart, but peaked at number 2 on the NZ Hot Singles Chart.)	—	49		Don't Be Dumb
"Playa"	2026	59	18	12	66	—	50	—	—	—		Don't Be Dumb
"No Trespassing"	2026	65	22	16	72	19	53	—	—	—		Don't Be Dumb
"Stop Snitching" (featuring BossMan Dlow and Sauce Walka)	2026	62	20	14	91	—	64	—	—	—		Don't Be Dumb
"STFU" (featuring Slay Squad)	2026	— (Note: "STFU" did not enter the Billboard Hot 100, but peaked at number 6 on the Bubbling Under Hot 100 Singles chart.)	39	—	—	—	—	—	—	—		Don't Be Dumb
"Air Force (Black DeMarco)"	2026	81	28	21	—	—	80	—	—	—		Don't Be Dumb
"Whiskey (Release Me)" (featuring Gorillaz and Westside Gunn)	2026	88	31	24	—	—	71	—	—	—		Don't Be Dumb
"Robbery" (featuring Doechii)	2026	— (Note: "Robbery" did not enter the Billboard Hot 100, but peaked at number 8 on the Bubbling Under Hot 100 Singles chart.)	—	—	—	—	—	—	—	—		Don't Be Dumb
"Don't Be Dumb / Trip Baby"	2026	73	25	18	—	—	67	—	—	—		Don't Be Dumb
"—" denotes a recording that did not chart or was not released in that territory. "*" denotes that the chart did not exist at that time.

== Guest appearances ==
List of non-single guest appearances, with other performing artists, showing year released and album name
Title	Year	Artist(s)	Album
"4 Loko"	2011	Smoke DZA	Rolling Stoned
"Sour State of Mind"	2011	Chase Fetti	Non-album songs
"U.G.K."	2011	Main Attrakionz	Non-album songs
"Megan Good"	2011	ASAP Ferg	Non-album songs
"Real Hustler's Don't Sleep"	2011	Juicy J, SpaceGhostPurrp	Blue Dream & Lean
"Make It Stack"	2011	Lloyd Banks	The Cold Corner 2
"Big Spender"	2011	Theophilus London	Rose Island Vol. 1
"Yao Ming" (Remix)	2012	David Banner, Chris Brown	Sex, Drugs & Video Games
"Hot Thing"	2012	Usher	Looking 4 Myself
"Beastin'"	2012	Chase N. Cashe	Charm
"Lines"	2012	Big Boi, Phantogram	Vicious Lies and Dangerous Rumors
"Wildside"	2012	T.I.	Trouble Man: Heavy Is the Head
"Baking Soda"	2012	All Over Chief	Non-album song
"Gangsta"	2013	Yelawolf, Big Henry	Trunk Muzik Returns
"Brothers"	2013	Kid Cudi, King Chip	Indicud
"Wildest Moments" (Remix)	2013	Jessie Ware	Devotion
"24K"	2013	Trips N Slim	The Preface
"Max Julien"	2013	Funkmaster Flex, ASAP Ferg	Who You Mad At? Me or Yourself?
"We Them Niggas"	2013	P. Reign	Dear America
"Beautiful" (Remix)	2013	Mariah Carey, Miguel	Non-album remix
"Scholarship"	2013	Juicy J	Stay Trippy
"Kush Coma"	2013	Danny Brown, Zelooperz	Old
"T.K.O." (Remix)	2013	Justin Timberlake, J. Cole, Pusha T	Non-album remix
"R - Cali"	2013	—N/a	The Music of Grand Theft Auto V
"Californication"	2014	Schoolboy Q	Oxymoron
"Servin' Lean" (Remix)	2014	Peewee Longway	The Blue M&M
"No Rest for the Wicked" (Remix)	2014	Lykke Li	I Never Learn
"We Them"	2014	Preme	Dear America
"Crib in My Closet"	2014	2 Chainz, Rick Ross	Freebase
"Awwsome" (Remix)	2014	Shy Glizzy, 2 Chainz	LAW 3: Now or Never
"I Got Money"	2015	Raekwon	Fly International Luxurious Art
"Superheroes"	2015	Chief Keef	Bang 3
"Off the Rip" (Remix)	2015	French Montana, Chinx	Wave Gods
"M.P.A."	2015	Pusha T, Kanye West, The-Dream	King Push – Darkest Before Dawn: The Prelude
"Wu-Tang Forever" (Remix)	2016	Drake	Non-album remix
"Lords Never Worry"	2016	ASAP Twelvyy, ASAP Nast	Non-album song
"Nine"	2016	Smoke DZA	George Kush da Button: Don't Pass Trump the Blunt
"Be Somebody"	2016	Clams Casino, Lil B	32 Levels
"Prima Donna"	2016	Vince Staples	Prima Donna
"New Level" (Remix)	2016	ASAP Ferg, Future, Lil Uzi Vert	Non-album remixes
"Chanel" (Remix)	2017	Frank Ocean	Non-album remixes
"New Choppa"	2017	Playboi Carti	Playboi Carti
"Diamonds"	2017	ASAP Twelvyy	12
"Love Yourself" (Remix)	2017	Mary J. Blige	Non-album remixes
"Dawsin's Breek" (Remix)	2017	Ty Dolla Sign	Non-album remixes
"Reminder" (Remix)	2017	The Weeknd, Young Thug	Non-album remixes
"The Mattress" (Remix)	2017	ASAP Ferg, Playboi Carti, Rich the Kid, Famous Dex	Still Striving
"Jumped Out the Whip"	2017	Gucci Mane	Mr. Davis
"Ghost Ride"	2017	Skepta, ASAP Nast	Vicious EP
"Breakfast"	2017	Jaden Smith	Syre
"Freaky"	2017	Juicy J, Suicideboys	Highly Intoxicated
"Feed the Streets"	2017	Juicy J, Project Pat	Rubba Band Business
"FTW (Fuck the World)"	2017	Tom Morello	Bright: The Album
"One Track Mind"	2018	Thirty Seconds to Mars	America
"Nights Like This"	2018	Lord Fubu	First Name Lord, Last Name Fubu
"Mario Cart"	2018	ASAP Ant	Non-album single
"Chewing Gum"	2018	Blood Orange, Project Pat	Negro Swan
"Chancer"	2018	Dean Blunt	Soul on Fire
"Swerve on Em"	2018	Action Bronson	White Bronco
"Walk" (Remix)	2019	Comethazine	Non-album remix
"Chateau"	2019	Jaden Smith	Erys
"Too Many Gods"	2019	Joey Badass	For the Throne: Music Inspired by the HBO Series Game of Thrones
"On GOD"	2019	Mustard, ASAP Ferg, YG, Tyga	Perfect Ten
"Benzo Amore Freestyle"	2020	Babyfather	Roaches 2012-2019 (Super Deluxe)
"T.D"	2020	Lil Yachty, Tierra Whack, Tyler, the Creator	Lil Boat 3
"Corner"	2020	French Montana, Zak	CB5
"Po Up"	2020	Juicy J	The Hustle Continues
"Triple Double"	2020	Jean Dawson	Pixel Bath
"19"	2020	Dean Blunt	ZUSHI
"Bankroll"	2021	Brockhampton	Roadrunner: New Light, New Machine
"Far Away"	2021	Yebba	Dawn
"Lane Switcha"	2021	Skepta, Pop Smoke, Juicy J, Project Pat	F9 (soundtrack)
"Livin It Up"	2021	Young Thug, Post Malone	Punk
"For Sale"	2021	Strick	Strick Land
"Streets Alone"	2021	Maxo Kream	Weight of the World
"Wave Gods"	2021	Nas, DJ Premier	Magic
"Confidence"	2022	Fivio Foreign	B.I.B.L.E.
"Strangers"	2022	Black Thought, Danger Mouse, Run the Jewels	Cheat Codes
"Frankenstein"	2022	Swedish House Mafia	Paradise Again
"Shootouts in Soho"	2022	Westside Gunn, Stove God Cooks	10
"Money Cash Clothes"	2022	The Game	Drillmatic – Heart vs. Mind
"Feel the Fiyaaaah"	2022	Metro Boomin, Takeoff	Heroes & Villains
"Chit Chat"	2023	French Montana, DJ Drama, Smooky Margielaa	Coke Boys 6
"Wharf Talk"	2023	Tyler, the Creator	Call Me If You Get Lost: The Estate Sale
"Am I Dreaming"	2023	Metro Boomin, Roisee	Spider-Man: Across the Spider-Verse (Soundtrack from and Inspired by the Motion Picture)
"Nonviolent Communication"	2023	Metro Boomin, James Blake, 21 Savage	Spider-Man: Across the Spider-Verse (Soundtrack from and Inspired by the Motion Picture)
"Yams Day"	2023	ASAP Twelvvy, ASAP Ferg, ASAP Ant	Kids Gotta Eat da Deluxe
"Outside All Night"	2023	Brent Faiyaz, N3WYRKLA	Larger than Life
"Wow"	2024	Kid Cudi	Insano
"Show of Hands"	2024	Future, Metro Boomin	We Still Don't Trust You
"URRRGE!!!!"	2024	Doja Cat	Scarlet 2 Claude
"Big Dawgs (Remix)"	2024	Hanumankind, Kalmi	Monsoon Season
"HOODLUMZ"	2024	Denzel Curry	King of the Mischievous South Vol. 2
"Supa Cousteau"	2025	El Cousteau	Dirty Harry 2
"December 31st"	2025	Ty Dolla $ign, Tommy Revenge	Tycoon
"Chase A Check"	2025	Max B	Public Domain 7: The Purge (Patient Zero Deluxe)
"Funny Friends"	2026	Thundercat	Distracted
"Baby Breath"	2026	Quavo, Pharrell Williams, Tyler, the Creator	Qrömelife

== Production discography ==
List of production (songwriting and arrangement) and non-performing songwriting credits (excluding guest appearances, interpolations, and samples)
Track(s)	Year	Credit	Artist(s)	Album
1. "Long Live ASAP"	2013	Co-producer (with Frank Romano)	ASAP Rocky	Long. Live. ASAP
4. "Fashion Killa"	2013	Producer (with Friendzone and Hector Delgado)	ASAP Rocky	Long. Live. ASAP
8. "Wild for the Night"	2013	Remix producer (with Skrillex)	ASAP Rocky	Long. Live. ASAP
12. "Suddenly"	2013	Producer (with ASAP Ty Beats and Hector Delgado)	ASAP Rocky	Long. Live. ASAP
13. "Jodye"	2013	Producer (with Joey Fatts and Hector Delgado)	ASAP Rocky	Long. Live. ASAP
14. "Ghetto Symphony"; (featuring Gunplay and ASAP Ferg)	2013	Producer (with V Don and Jonothan "MP" Williams)	ASAP Rocky	Long. Live. ASAP
—N/a	2013	Executive producer	ASAP Ferg	Trap Lord
6. "Good for You"; (featuring ASAP Rocky)	2015	Co-producer (as "Lord Flacko") (with Hector Delgado, Nick Monson, and Sir Nolan)	Selena Gomez	Revival
—N/a	2017	Executive producer	Playboi Carti	Playboi Carti
—N/a	2017	Art director, designer	Juicy J	Rubba Band Business
4. "Wolves"; (featuring Post Malone)	2020	Songwriter, additional vocals	Big Sean	Detroit 2
5. "WOT"	2021	Songwriter	Slowthai	TYRON
3. "Count on Me"	2021	Songwriter	Brockhampton	Roadrunner: New Light, New Machine
8. "Livin' It Up"; (featuring Post Malone and ASAP Rocky)	2021	Producer (with Charlie Handsome)	Young Thug	Punk
6. "Frankenstein"; (featuring ASAP Rocky)	2022	Producer (with Swedish House Mafia, Desembra, Vargas & Lagola, and Kelvin Krash)	Swedish House Mafia	Paradise Again
9. "Lifetime"; (featuring Ty Dolla Sign and 070 Shake)	2022	Songwriter	Swedish House Mafia	Paradise Again

== Music videos ==
List of music videos, with directors, showing year released
Title	Year	Director(s)	Ref.
"Get High" (featuring ASAP Ferg)	2010	King Zulu	
"Purple Swag"	2011	Jason Ano	
"Peso"	2011	Abteen Bagheri	
"Demons"	2011	Donjai	
"Wassup"	2012	ASAP Rocky, Jacob Burghart, Andy Capper	
"Goldie"	2012	ASAP Rocky	
"Brand New Guy" (featuring Schoolboy Q)	2012	The ICU, ASAP Rocky	
"Purple Kisses"	2012	ASAP Rocky, Luke Monaghan	
"Bath Salt" (with ASAP Ant featuring Flatbush Zombies)	2012	Shomi Patwary, ASAP Rocky	
"Fuckin' Problems" (featuring Drake, 2 Chainz and Kendrick Lamar)	2012	Samantha Lecca, Clark Jackson	
"Long Live ASAP"	2012	Samantha Lecca, ASAP Rocky	
"Wild for the Night" (featuring Skrillex and Birdy Nam Nam)	2013	Chris Robinson, ASAP Rocky	
"Fashion Killa"	2013	ASAP Rocky, Delaware	
"Angels"	2013	ASAP Rocky, Luke Monaghan	
"Phoenix"	2013	Francesco Carrozzini	
"Multiply" (featuring Juicy J)	2014	Shomi Patwary, ASAP Rocky	
"Lord Pretty Flacko Jodye 2"	2015	Samantha Lecca	
"L$D"	2015	Dexter Navy, ASAP Rocky	
"Jukebox Joints"	2015	ASAP Rocky, Shomi Patwary, Awge	
"JD"	2016	ASAP Rocky, Dexter Navy	
"ASAP Forever" (featuring Moby)	2018	Dexter Navy	
"Herojuana Blunts"	2018	Awge	
"Praise the Lord (Da Shine)" (featuring Skepta)	2018	Dexter Navy	
"Potato Salad" (featuring Tyler, the Creator)	2018	Awge	
"Crazy Brazy" (featuring ASAP Twelvyy and KEY!)	2018	Awge	
"Money Bags Freestyle"	2018	Awge	
"Fukk Sleep" (featuring FKA Twigs)	2018	Diana Kunst	
"Sundress"	2018	Frank Lebon	
"Gunz N Butter" (featuring Juicy J)	2018	James Mackel	
"Tony Tone"	2018	Hidji Films, Awge	
"Kids Turned Out Fine"	2019	Dexter Navy	
"Babushka Boi"	2019	Nadia Lee Cohen	
"Arya" (with Nigo)	2022	Awge	
"D.M.B."	2022	ASAP Rocky for Awge	
"Shittin' Me"	2022	Grin Machine	
"Riot (Rowdy Pipe'n)" (with Pharrell Williams)	2023	ASAP Rocky, Awge	
"Highjack" (featuring Jessica Pratt)	2024	Awge, Thibaut Grevet	
"Tailor Swif"	2024	Vania Heymann, Gal Muggia	
"Pray4DaGang" (featuring KayCyy)	2025	Marius Gonzalez	
"Punk Rocky"	2026	ASAP Rocky, Folkert Verdoorn, Simon Becks	
"Helicopter"	2026	Dan Streit	
"Whiskey / Black DeMarco"	2026	Awge, Pinky & Zemborain	
"Flackito Jodye" (featuring Tokischa)	2026	Awge	

=== Guest videos ===
List of music videos, with directors, showing year released
Title	Year	Director(s)	Ref.
"Shabba" (ASAP Ferg)	2013	Andy Hines	
"Work" (Remix) (ASAP Ferg, Schoolboy Q, Trinidad James, French Montana)	2013	ASAP Ferg, Shomi Patwary	
"Lovesick" (Mura Masa)	2016	Yoni Lappin	
"Blended Family (What You Do for Love)" (Alicia Keys)	2016	Hype Williams	
"The Mattress" (ASAP Ferg)	2017	Awge	
"Gilligan" (DRAM, Juicy J)	2017	Nadia Lee Cohen	
"Who Dat Boy" (Tyler, the Creator)	2017	Tyler Okonma	
"Chewing Gum" (Blood Orange, Project Pat)	2018	Devonté Hynes	
"Pups" (ASAP Ferg)	2019	ASAP Ferg, ASAP Rocky, Shomi Patwary	
"Mazza" (Slowthai)	2021	The Rest	
"The God Hour" (ASAP Ant)	2021	Geerten Harmens	
"Wave Gods" (Nas, DJ Premier)	2022	ASAP Rocky, Hidji Films, Spike Jordan	
"Gangsta" (Free Nationals, Anderson .Paak)	2024	François Rousselet	

== See also ==
- ASAP Mob discography
