= Electric Body =

Song by ASAP Rocky featuring Schoolboy Q

from the album At. Long. Last. ASAP
- Released: May 26, 2015
- Recorded: 2015
- Genre: Hip hop • dirty rap
- Length: 4:15
- Label: ASAP Worldwide; Polo Grounds; RCA
- Songwriters: Rakim Mayers; Quincey Hanley; Hector Delgado; Brian Burton; Edwin Perez; David Colquit; Teddy Walton; Nino Farhan
- Producers: Hector Delgado; Danger Mouse (add.); THC (add.); Teddy Walton (add.)

"Electric Body" is a song by American hip hop recording artist ASAP Rocky, taken from Rocky's second studio album At. Long. Last. ASAP (2015). The song, produced by Hector Delgado with add prod by Danger Mouse and Teddy Walton, features a guest appearance from Rocky's frequent collaborator and fellow American rapper Schoolboy Q. Upon the release of the album, high downloads resulted in the song peaking at number 80 on the US Billboard Hot 100 chart.

== Background ==
On May 22, 2015, a tagged version of the song was leaked by DJ Envy. The song marks the fifth collaboration between Rocky and Schoolboy Q, with the first being "Brand New Guy", from Rocky's first mixtape Live. Love. ASAP (2011), followed by "Hands on the Wheel" featured on Schoolboy Q's Habits & Contradictions (2012), then "PMW (All I Really Need)" from Rocky's debut album Long. Live. ASAP (2013), succeeded by "Californication", featured on Schoolboy Q's major-label debut Oxymoron (2014).

== Live performances ==
On July 3, 2015, Rocky performed "Electric Body" during his set at the Wireless Festival. In September 2015, he performed the song with Schoolboy Q on Jimmy Kimmel Live!.

== Charts ==
Chart (2015)	Peak position
US Billboard Hot 100	80
US Hot R&B/Hip-Hop Songs (Billboard)	27

== Certifications ==
Region	Certification	Certified units/sales
Canada (Music Canada)	Gold	40,000^{‡}
New Zealand (RMNZ)	Gold	15,000^{‡}
United States (RIAA)	Platinum	1,000,000^{‡}
^{‡} Sales+streaming figures based on certification alone.

== Release history ==
Country	Date	Format	Label
United States	May 26, 2015	Digital download	Polo Grounds; RCA
