= Phoenix (ASAP Rocky song) =

Song by ASAP Rocky

from the album Long. Live. ASAP
- Released: January 15, 2013
- Recorded: 2012
- Genre: East Coast hip hop
- Length: 3:54
- Label: ASAP Worldwide; Polo Grounds; RCA
- Songwriters: Rakim Mayers; Brian Burton
- Producer: Danger Mouse

Music video
- "Phoenix" on YouTube

"Phoenix" is a song by American hip hop recording artist ASAP Rocky. It was released on January 15, 2013, on his debut studio album Long.Live.ASAP (2013), through ASAP Worldwide, Polo Grounds Music, and RCA Records. The song, an east coast hip-hop record, was recorded in 2012, and produced by Danger Mouse, who also wrote the track alongside Rocky. Upon its release, the song charted at number 2 on the Billboard Bubbling Under R&B/Hip-Hop Singles chart in the United States of America, despite not being released as a single.

== Music video ==
The music video was released on November 12, 2013. It was directed by Francesco Carrozzini and written by Carrozzini and Asia Argento. The video stars Michael K. Williams, known for his roles in The Wire and Boardwalk Empire, as well as model Joan Smalls.

== Composition and reception ==
The Guardian described "Phoenix" as "richly melodic". Paste magazine called Rocky performance to be "oddly out of sync".

== Track listing ==
Album version
No.	Title	Writer(s)	Producer(s)	Length
1.	"Phoenix"	Rakim Mayers; Brian Burton	Danger Mouse	3:54

== Charts ==
Chart (2013)	Peak position
US Bubbling Under R&B/Hip-Hop Singles (Billboard)	2
