= Fuckin' Problems =

2012 single by ASAP Rocky featuring 2 Chainz, Drake and Kendrick Lamar

"Fuckin'Problems"

Single by ASAP Rocky featuring Drake, 2 Chainz and Kendrick Lamar

from the album Long. Live. ASAP
- Released: October 24, 2012
- Recorded: 2012
- Genre: Hip-hop; trap; dirty rap
- Length: 3:57
- Label: A$AP; Polo Grounds; RCA
- Songwriters: Rakim Mayers; Aubrey Graham; Tauheed Epps; Kendrick Duckworth; Noah Shebib; Stephen Garrett
- Producers: Noah "40" Shebib; C. Papi (co.)

ASAP Rocky singles chronology
"Cockiness (Love It)" (remix) (2012)	"Fuckin'Problems" (2012)	"Wild for the Night" (2013)

Drake singles chronology
"We in This Bitch 1.5" (2012)	"Fuckin'Problems" (2012)	"Lord Knows" (2012)

2 Chainz singles chronology
"Bandz a Make Her Dance" (2012)	"Fuckin'Problems" (2012)	"I'm Different" (2012)

Kendrick Lamar singles chronology
"Swimming Pools (Drank)" (2012)	"Fuckin'Problems" (2012)	"Backseat Freestyle" (2012)

Music video
- "Fuckin' Problems" on YouTube

"Fuckin'Problems" (titled as simply "Problems" and "F**kin'Problems" on the clean versions) is a song by American rapper ASAP Rocky, featuring Canadian rapper Drake and fellow American rappers 2 Chainz and Kendrick Lamar. It was released on October 24, 2012, as the second single from Rocky's debut studio album Long. Live. ASAP (2013), and was later released to radio on November 27, 2012.

Noah "40" Shebib assisted the artists in writing the song and also serves as producer alongside Drake, who co-produced under the pseudonym C. Papi. Though uncredited, the song also interpolates Ol' Dirty Bastard's "Shimmy Shimmy Ya". The song was nominated for Best Rap Song at the 56th Annual Grammy Awards.

== Background ==
In an interview with XXL, Drake stated that he originally recorded the song in a studio session with rapper 2 Chainz. Drake wanted to release the song within two months instead of waiting for the intended release date of his album, and offered it to Kendrick Lamar. Lamar recorded a verse on the song, but it was determined to be unsuitable for Lamar's album. Drake subsequently collaborated with ASAP Rocky, who released the song for his own album. The singer-songwriter Stephen "Static Major" Garrett is credited due to the sampling of Aaliyah's unreleased song "Don't Be Jealous".

== Music video ==
The music video, directed by Sam Lecca and Clark Jackson, premiered on December 3, 2012 on 106 & Park.

== Remixes ==
Young Money rapper Tyga has a freestyle to the song on his 2012 mixtape, 187, alongside "Clique" by Kanye West. Lil Wayne freestyled over the beat on his Dedication 5 mixtape along with Kidd Kidd and Euro. Other freestyles and remixes to the song have been done by Rick Ross (with Stalley), Trey Songz, Joell Ortiz and Kevin McCall, among others.

== Critical reception ==
Complex named the song number 21 on their list of the 50 best songs of 2012. Pitchfork ranked it at number 35 on their list of the top 100 songs of 2013. XXL positioned it at number 14 on their list of the best songs of the year.

== Chart performance ==
The song has sold over two million digital copies in the US as of October 2013. The song has since peaked at number 8 on the Billboard Hot 100 chart, and is the most successful song on the album. It is also Rocky's most successful song as a lead artist.

== Charts ==
=== Weekly charts ===
Chart (2012–2013)	Peak position
Australia (ARIA)	78
Belgium (Ultratip Bubbling Under Flanders)	3
Belgium Urban (Ultratop Flanders)	11
Belgium (Ultratip Bubbling Under Wallonia)	27
Canada Hot 100 (Billboard)	65
France (SNEP)	30
Portugal (AFP)	42
Germany (GfK)	86
Switzerland (Schweizer Hitparade)	65
UK Singles (Official Charts)	50
UK Hip Hop/R&B (Official Charts)	10
US Billboard Hot 100	8
US Hot R&B/Hip-Hop Songs (Billboard)	2
US Hot Rap Songs (Billboard)	2
US Rhythmic Airplay (Billboard)	2

Chart (2019)	Peak position
Ukraine Airplay (TopHit)	31

=== Year-end charts ===
Chart (2013)	Position
Belgium (Ultratop Flanders Urban)	43
France (SNEP)	183
US Billboard Hot 100	41
US Hot R&B/Hip-Hop Songs (Billboard)	8
US Rhythmic (Billboard)	15

== Certifications ==
Region	Certification	Certified units/sales
Australia (ARIA)	3× Platinum	210,000^{‡}
Canada (Music Canada)	Platinum	80,000^{*}
Germany (BVMI)	Gold	150,000^{‡}
Italy (FIMI)	Gold	35,000^{‡}
New Zealand (RMNZ)	4× Platinum	120,000^{‡}
Sweden (GLF)	Gold	20,000^{‡}
United Kingdom (BPI)	Platinum	600,000^{‡}
United States (RIAA)	8× Platinum	8,000,000^{‡}
Streaming
Denmark (IFPI Danmark)	Platinum	1,800,000^{†}
^{*} Sales figures based on certification alone.^{‡} Sales+streaming figures based on certification alone.^{†} Streaming-only figures based on certification alone.

== Release history ==
Region	Date	Format(s)	Label(s)	Ref.
United States	October 24, 2012	Digital download; streaming	A$AP Worldwide; Polo Grounds; RCA	
United States	November 27, 2012	Rhythmic contemporary radio	A$AP Worldwide; Polo Grounds; RCA	
