= Goldie (song) =

2012 single by ASAP Rocky

Single by ASAP Rocky

from the album Long. Live. ASAP
- Released: April 27, 2012
- Recorded: 2012
- Genre: Hip-hop
- Length: 3:14
- Label: ASAP Worldwide; Polo Grounds; RCA
- Songwriters: Rakim Mayers; Chauncey Hollis
- Producer: Hit-Boy

ASAP Rocky singles chronology
"Hands on the Wheel" (2012)	"Goldie" (2012)	"Cockiness (Love It)" (remix) (2012)

Music video
- "Goldie" on YouTube

"Goldie" is a song by American hip-hop recording artist ASAP Rocky. It was released on April 27, 2012, as the lead single from his debut studio album Long. Live. ASAP (2013). The song was produced by Hit-Boy, who wanted to play off Rocky's laid-back style of rapping, accompanied by intentional vocal distortions, to produce a sound bordering along comatose. Beneath the beat, Hit-Boy added a reverberating chant meant to add a sinister atmosphere to the track.

== Music video ==
The music video, which was filmed mostly in Paris, France, and directed by Rocky himself, was released on his Vevo channel on May 3, 2012. It features a major appearance by ASAP Worldwide co-founder ASAP Yams.

== Accolades ==
Complex named the song #30 on the 50 best songs of 2012 list. Rolling Stone named the song #27 on their 50 best songs of 2012 list. BET named the song the No. 35 music video of 2012 on their year-end Notarized countdown.

== Track listing ==
Digital single

No.	Title	Writer(s)	Producer(s)	Length
1.	"Goldie"	Rakim Mayers, Chauncey Hollis	Hit-Boy	3:14

== Charts ==
Chart (2012)	Peak position
UK Singles (Official Charts Company)	98
UK R&B (Official Charts Company)	34
US Hot R&B/Hip-Hop Songs (Billboard)	55

== Certifications ==
Certifications for "Goldie"
Region	Certification	Certified units/sales
New Zealand (RMNZ)	Platinum	30,000^{‡}
United Kingdom (BPI)	Silver	200,000^{‡}
United States (RIAA)	Platinum	1,000,000^{‡}
^{‡} Sales+streaming figures based on certification alone.

== Release history ==
Country	Date	Format	Label
United States	April 30, 2012	Digital download	Polo Grounds, RCA
