= 1 Train (song) =

2013 song by ASAP Rocky

"1Train"

Song by ASAP Rocky featuring Kendrick Lamar, Joey Badass, Yelawolf, Danny Brown, Action Bronson and Big K.R.I.T.

from the album Long. Live. ASAP
- Released: January 15, 2013
- Recorded: 2012
- Genre: East Coast hip hop
- Length: 6:12
- Label: ASAP Worldwide; Polo Grounds; RCA
- Songwriters: Rakim Mayers; Ariyan Arslani; Michael Atha; Kendrick Lamar; Chauncey Hollis; Daniel Sewell; Justin Scott; Jo-Vaughn Virginie Scott; Assala Nasri
- Producer: Hit-Boy

Audio sample
- file; help

"1Train" is a song by American hip hop recording artist ASAP Rocky from his debut studio album, Long. Live. ASAP (2013). The song was produced by Hit-Boy, and features additional verses from fellow American rappers Kendrick Lamar, Joey Badass, Yelawolf, Danny Brown, Action Bronson, and Big K.R.I.T. The song is a posse cut created to feel like an "original '90s underground track."

Upon the release of Long. Live. ASAP, the track was positively received by music critics, and high downloads resulted in the song peaking at number three on the US Billboard Bubbling Under Hot 100 Singles chart. The song also charted at number 31 on the Hot R&B/Hip-Hop Songs chart, and was certified gold by Recorded Music New Zealand (RMNZ) for equivalent sales of 15,000 units in the country.

== Background ==
The song features an ensemble of fellow American rappers, including Kendrick Lamar, Joey Badass, Yelawolf, Danny Brown, Action Bronson and Big K.R.I.T. Rocky described the meaning behind the song saying, "I wanted to make a posse cut that felt like an original '90s underground track, and I didn't have to tell anyone what to do." He also said he "took it upon myself to feature all the people who I respect as artists of my generation." Rocky wanted to make sure that the track turned out perfectly, so he pieced it together himself, determining the order of every feature. He also said his favorite verse in the song is K.R.I.T.'s.

The song's title is a reference to the New York City Subway 1 Broadway–Seventh Avenue Local service. Rocky elaborated saying, "When you think about New York, you think about things like the subway, and I needed to bring it back to that essence," he said. "[But] when I'm rapping and mentioning 'anything is better than that 1 train,' it's the truth." He also said, "I was just thinking of each artist as a different train stop, and when you hear that beat, it just brings me back to like - well, for me, it brings me back to being at the bus stop or being on the train early in the morning, cold, mad at life on the way to school late. I'm showing up third period - that's the 1 train. Anything is better than the 1 train."

On December 18, 2012, the song leaked along with the rest of the album, a month before its retail release. Following the song's leak, it was rumored that Joey Badass would be signing to Jay-Z's Roc Nation record label, due to his comments in the song. However, in January 2013, Joey dispelled the rumors saying he would rather stay independent than sign to a major label for the time being.

== Music and lyrics ==
"1 Train" features a looped instrumental sampled from the 2003 song "Senen" by Syrian artist, Assala Nasri. The song also features no refrain and continuous verses from the featured artists. Due to this it has received many comparisons to classic Wu-Tang Clan cypher style songs.

== Critical reception ==
The song was met with generally positive reviews, and sparked much debate on which rapper had the strongest verse on the song. Luke Fox of Exclaim! named the song an "indisputable mega-posse cut, "1 Train" is an event song, the kind of 1990s throwback album cut that, in a bygone era, would cause a segment of heads to buy the CD just for that one tune." Roman Cooper also gave the song a positive review saying, ""1 Train" is truly a must-listen as Rocky, Kendrick Lamar, Joey Bada$$, Yelawolf, Danny Brown, Action Bronson, and Big K.R.I.T. perfectly execute the cypher-style posse cut that's largely been missing since the 1990s. Each emcee comes correct, so don't be surprised if you and your friends will all have different favorite verses. The cut is also a perfect example of Rocky's refusal to be regional, as K.R.I.T.'s Southern drawl hits home just as well as Bronson's gritty NYC flavor." Expert Witness of MSN Music called the song a "terrific virtual-posse cut." Chris DeVillie of The A.V. Club credited Rocky for assembling an "eye-popping tag team of recent next big things to set the bar for 2013 posse cuts." Idolator praised all the rappers verses and called the song an "utterly ferocious, old school posse cut. Andrew Nosnitsky of Spin called the song, "a flatlined true-school posse cut that features every rapper you've ever read about on a blog", also saying Danny Brown had the best verse.

David Amidon of PopMatters said the instrumental "seems to go on forever despite a lot of solid verses, Hit-Boy's beat just fails to bring any energy to the situation. You can feel him going for a classic 1993, gritty NYC type cypher beat but it's just not there, a simple loud drum loop and a quickly grating violin swirl. It changes up a little but overall doesn't really get the Aftermath meets DITC vibe it's going for. It's especially a shame considering the talents of the rappers on hand, and the risks that are taken elsewhere." Michael Walsh of The Boston Phoenix called Rocky's verse his toughest on the album, however said that it was overshadowed by the guest appearances. Jesse Cataldo of Slant Magazine said the guests, "sound hungrier and more lyrically inventive than A$AP, who hangs back and contributes little." Chris Kelly of Fact also gave it a more mixed review saying, it is "an interesting experiment, but one so obviously engineered for blog interest that it's tough to enjoy on its merits. It would have been better off as a segment at the BET Awards, rather than a six-minute series of verses in the middle of the album." Lucy Jones of NME also gave the song a mixed review, saying ASAP Rocky sounded weak compared to the guest rappers on the song. Dan Jackson of CMJ gave it a more negative review, calling it a "meandering, directionless mess."

Complex not only named Brown's verse the best of the song, they named his the sixth best verse of 2013. They said, "It's not just the sounds of Danny's voice that make this a memorable affair; the verse itself is the eccentric at his finest, from his tightly packed wordplay ("That molly got me nauseous, aw shit, no off switch") to drug references to comedic lines, it's some of the most remarkable chaos around." HipHopDX called it one of the most memorable tracks of 2013.

== Charts ==
Chart (2013)	Peak position
US Bubbling Under Hot 100 (Billboard)	3
US Hot R&B/Hip-Hop Songs (Billboard)	31

== Certifications ==
Certifications for "1Train"
Region	Certification	Certified units/sales
New Zealand (RMNZ)	Gold	15,000^{‡}
^{‡} Sales+streaming figures based on certification alone.
