= Wild for the Night =

Single by ASAP Rocky featuring Skrillex and Birdy Nam Nam

from the album Long. Live. ASAP
- Released: March 26, 2013
- Recorded: 2012
- Genre: Hip hop; dubstep; electro rap
- Length: 3:29
- Label: A$AP Worldwide; Polo Grounds; RCA
- Songwriters: Rakim Meyers; Sonny Moore; Mickael Dalmoro; Denis Lebouvier; Thomas Parent; Nicolas Vadon; Julien Pradeyrol
- Producers: Skrillex; Birdy Nam Nam; Lord Flacko (remixed)

ASAP Rocky singles chronology
"Fuckin' Problems" (2012)	"Wild for the Night" (2013)	"Shabba" (2013)

Skrillex singles chronology
"Make It Bun Dem" (2012)	"Wild for the Night" (2013)	"Try It Out" (2013)

Birdy Nam Nam singles chronology
"Defiant Order" (2013)	"Wild for the Night" (2013)

Music video
- "Wild for the Night" on YouTube

Audio sample
- "Wild for the Night": file; help

"Wild for the Night" is a song by American hip hop recording artist ASAP Rocky and primarily produced by Skrillex. It was released on March 26, 2013, as the third single from his debut studio album Long. Live. ASAP. On March 26, 2013, the song was officially released to rhythmic crossover radio as the third single and the music video was released. The song peaked at number 80 on the Billboard Hot 100.

"Wild for the Night" is primarily based on Skrillex's "Goin' Down" mix of the Birdy Nam Nam song "Goin' In".

== Background ==
"Wild for the Night" was released as the album's second promotional single on January 11, 2013. The single listed both Skrillex and Birdy Nam Nam as featured guests, although the only guest listed on the album is Skrillex who produced the track along with Birdy Nam Nam and later remixed it with Rocky as Lord Flacko. It was confirmed shortly after by Rocky himself that the track will serve as the third official single.

== Music video ==
The music video was shot in the Dominican Republic with Skrillex and featured cameos from the ASAP Mob. The music video premiered on March 25, 2013, on 106 & Park. The video was directed by A$AP and Chris Robinson, and is 5 minutes and 52 seconds duration, from start to finish.

== Live performances ==
Rocky performed a live version of the song for BBC Radio 1's Live Lounge, which features on the Live Lounge 2013 compilation album.

== Critical reception ==
NME ranked the song at number 20, on their list of the 50 best songs of 2013. They commented saying, "the pitch-shifted vocals of A$AP Rocky and the intergalactic bass overload of Skrillex were at odds with one another, yet the rapper and producer combined to make 2013's biggest mongrel banger. ‘Wild for the Night’ was brash and obnoxious, but by defying convention this odd couple gave both the hip-hop and EDM kids their anthem for the year."

== Awards and nominations ==
Year	Ceremony	Award	Result
2014	mtvU Woodie Awards	Best Collaboration Woodie	Won

== Chart performance ==
Chart (2013)	Peak position
Belgium (Ultratip Bubbling Under Flanders)	13
Canada Hot 100 (Billboard)	65
France (SNEP)	169
New Zealand (Recorded Music NZ)	38
US Billboard Hot 100	80
US Hot R&B/Hip-Hop Songs (Billboard)	26
US Rhythmic Airplay (Billboard)	31

=== Year-end charts ===
Chart (2013)	Position
US Hot R&B/Hip-Hop Songs (Billboard)	70

=== Certifications ===
Region	Certification	Certified units/sales
Australia (ARIA)	Platinum	70,000^{‡}
Canada (Music Canada)	Platinum	80,000^{‡}
Denmark (IFPI Danmark) Streaming	Platinum	2,600,000^{†}
New Zealand (RMNZ)	2× Platinum	60,000^{‡}
United Kingdom (BPI)	Silver	200,000^{‡}
United States (RIAA)	2× Platinum	2,000,000^{‡}
^{‡} Sales+streaming figures based on certification alone.^{†} Streaming-only figures based on certification alone.

== Release history ==
Country	Date	Format	Label
United States	January 11, 2013	Promotional single	RCA Records
United States	March 26, 2013	Urban contemporary radio	RCA Records
