= Long Live ASAP =

Promotional single by ASAP Rocky featuring Kučka

from the album Long. Live. ASAP
- Released: December 18, 2012
- Recorded: 2012
- Genre: East Coast hip hop; PBR&B
- Length: 4:49
- Label: ASAP Worldwide; Polo Grounds; RCA
- Songwriters: Rakim Mayers; James Scheffer; Richard Butler, Jr.; Michael Mule; Issac Deboni; Frank Romano; Laura Jane Lowther
- Producers: Jim Jonsin; Rico Love; Finatik & Zac (co.); Frank Romano (co.); Lord Flacko (co.)

Music videos
- "Long Live ASAP" (Clean - official video) on YouTube
- "Long Live ASAP" (Explicit - official video) on YouTube

"Long Live ASAP" (stylized as Long Live A$AP) is a song by American rapper ASAP Rocky featuring Australian singer Kučka, released on December 18, 2012 as the titular first promotional single from his debut studio album Long.Live.ASAP (2013), through ASAP Worldwide, Polo Grounds, and RCA Records. The song, an East Coast hip-hop and PBR&B record, was produced by both Jim Jonsin and Rico Love with co-production from Finatik & Zac, Frank Romano, and ASAP Rocky himself, under the pseudonym LORD FLACKO.

Upon its release, the song charted at number 86 on the Billboard Hot 100 and peaked at number 27 on the Hot R&B/Hip-Hop Songs chart in the United States. The song was also certified gold by the Recording Industry Association of America (RIAA) for equivalent sales of 500,000 units in the country. The track's music video was released on December 23, 2012 and was directed by Rocky himself, alongside Samantha Lecca.

== Track listing ==
Digital single

No.	Title	Writer(s)	Producer(s)	Length
1.	"Long Live ASAP"	Rakim Mayers, James Scheffer, Richard Butler, Jr., Michael Mule, Issac Deboni, Frank Romano, Laura Jane Lowther	Jim Jonsin, Rico Love, Finatik & Zac (co.), Frank Romano (co.), LORD FLACKO (co.)	4:49

== Charts ==
Chart (2013)	Peak position
US Billboard Hot 100	86
US Hot R&B/Hip-Hop Songs (Billboard)	27

== Certifications ==
Region	Certification	Certified units/sales
United States (RIAA)	Platinum	1,000,000^{‡}
^{‡} Sales+streaming figures based on certification alone.

== Release history ==
Country	Date	Format	Label
United States	December 18, 2012	Digital download	Polo Grounds, RCA
