= Fashion Killa =

2013 single by ASAP Rocky

Single by ASAP Rocky

from the album Long. Live. ASAP
- Released: November 2013
- Recorded: 2012
- Genre: Cloud rap; electropop
- Length: 3:56
- Label: ASAP Worldwide; Polo Grounds; RCA
- Songwriters: Rakim Mayers; Hector Delgado; James Laurence; Dylan Reznick; Terius Nash; Christopher Stewart
- Producers: Hector Delgado; Lord Flacko; Friendzone (co.)

ASAP Rocky singles chronology
"Shabba" (2013)	"Fashion Killa" (2013)	"Pretend" (2014)

Music video
- "Fashion Killa" on YouTube

"Fashion Killa" is a song by American rapper ASAP Rocky. It was serviced to urban contemporary radio in the United States in November 2013, as the fourth single from his debut studio album, Long. Live. ASAP (2013). The song was produced by both Hector Delgado and ASAP Rocky, credited under the pseudonym Lord Flacko, with co-production by Friendzone. It samples "Mr. Yeah" by The-Dream, from his 2009 album Love vs. Money.

== Critical reception ==
"Fashion Killa" garnered mixed reviews from music critics. Jesal Padania of RapReviews felt the track didn't belong on the album, calling it "a blatantly fawning song for the ladies that doesn't earn its place at the table." Roman Cooper of HipHopDX called it "a rare misstep as Rocky’s ambitions become a little too plastic and glossy." Alexis Petridis of The Guardian felt that the lyrics and their delivery showed that Rocky "has absolutely nothing to say" about designer clothes. Andrew Nosnitsky of Spin praised the song for calling back to Rocky's mixtape because of how its "angelic vocals skitter brilliantly." Nathan Slavik of DJBooth gave faint praise to "Fashion Killa", saying that it was "certainly at least designed to appeal to the ladies."

== Music video ==
The music video for the song premiered on BET's 106 & Park on September 23, 2013. Barbadian singer Rihanna is featured throughout the video, while Rocky's fellow ASAP Mob member ASAP Ferg also makes a cameo appearance. It was the first music video shot by Virgil Abloh.

== Use in other media ==
The song is featured in the 2016 film Zoolander 2, when Derek Zoolander and Hansel McDonald first meet special agent Valentina Valencia. ASAP Rocky also makes an appearance during the closing credits of the film.

== Track listing ==
Digital single

No.	Title	Writer(s)	Producer(s)	Length
1.	"Fashion Killa"	Rakim Mayers, Hector Delgado, James Laurence, Dylan Reznick, Terius Nash, Christopher Stewart	Hector Delgado, Lord Flacko, Friendzone (co.)	3:56

== Chart performance ==
Chart performance for "Fashion Killa"
Chart (2013)	Peak position
UK Singles (Official Charts)	80
UK Hip Hop/R&B (Official Charts)	11
US Hot R&B/Hip-Hop Songs (Billboard)	46

2026 chart performance for "Fashion Killa"
Chart (2026)	Peak position
Latvia Streaming (LaIPA)	19
Lithuania (AGATA)	60

== Certifications ==
Certifications for "Fashion Killa"
Region	Certification	Certified units/sales
Denmark (IFPI Danmark)	Gold	45,000^{‡}
New Zealand (RMNZ)	3× Platinum	90,000^{‡}
United Kingdom (BPI)	Gold	400,000^{‡}
United States (RIAA)	Platinum	1,000,000^{‡}
^{‡} Sales+streaming figures based on certification alone.
