= Long. Live. ASAP =

- Standard edition cover. The deluxe cover of the album is not split in two.

Studio album by ASAP Rocky
- Released: January 15, 2013
- Studios: Clockwork; Mondo; TDE Red Room; Y.O.L.O. (Los Angeles); Deuce Mobile; Downtown; Quad (New York City); Noble Street (Toronto); Parkland Playhouse (Parkland); Studio 16–18
- Genres: Hip-hop; cloud rap
- Length: 49:15
- Labels: ASAP; Polo Grounds; RCA
- Producers: 40; Amsterdam; Birdy Nam Nam; Clams Casino; Danger Mouse; Emile Haynie; Lord Flacko; Hector Delgado; Hit-Boy; Jim Jonsin; Joey Fatts; Rico Love; Skrillex; Soufien3000; T-Minus; V Don

ASAP Rocky chronology
Live. Love. ASAP (2011)	Long. Live. ASAP (2013)	At. Long. Last. ASAP (2015)

Singles from Long. Live. ASAP
- 1. "Goldie" Released: April 30, 2012; 2. "Fuckin'Problems" Released: October 24, 2012; 3. "Wild for the Night" Released: March 26, 2013; 4. "Fashion Killa" Released: November 2013

Long. Live. ASAP (stylized as LONG.LIVE.A$AP) is the debut studio album by American rapper ASAP Rocky. It was released on January 15, 2013, by ASAP Worldwide, Polo Grounds Music, and RCA Records. The album, a hip-hop and cloud rap record, features guest appearances from Kendrick Lamar, Schoolboy Q, 2 Chainz, Drake, Big K.R.I.T., Santigold, Overdoz, Yelawolf, Florence Welch, Danny Brown, Action Bronson, Joey Badass, Gunplay, and ASAP Ferg. The album's production was handled by Rocky himself (under the pseudonym Lord Flacko), Hector Delgado, Hit-Boy, Clams Casino, Jim Jonsin, T-Minus, Danger Mouse, 40, Skrillex, and Emile Haynie, among other high-profile producers.

The album was supported with four singles: "Goldie", "Fuckin'Problems", "Wild for the Night", and "Fashion Killa". "Fuckin' Problems" was Rocky's first single to reach the top 10 of the Billboard Hot 100, peaking at number 8, while "Wild for the Night" peaked at number 80 on the chart. The title track was also released as a promotional single, and charted at number 86 on the Hot 100. The album was also supported by Rocky's Long. Live. ASAP National Tour, featuring Schoolboy Q and Danny Brown as supporting acts. The album itself received generally positive reviews from critics, and charted at number one on the US Billboard 200, alongside topping the UK R&B Albums chart, the Top R&B/Hip-Hop Albums, and the Canadian Albums chart.

== Background ==
In May 2011, Rocky quit selling drugs and decided to focus on his rap career. When he released a music video for his song "Purple Swag", it garnered Internet buzz and attention from record labels, despite negative feedback from his native hip-hop scene in New York. He was courted by several labels, including the RCA-distributed Polo Grounds Music. However, he held off from any deal with a label, instead wanting to explore other pursuits. Rocky and Polo Grounds president Bryan Leach, also a Harlem native, subsequently spent time talking about music and lifestyles.

In August 2011, Rocky following a music video for the song "Peso", which first appeared on internet blogs and eventually received radio airplay on New York City's Hot 97. The song also earned him respect in the New York scene, of which he later said, "It bring a tear to my eye to see native New York people give me my props because New York is stubborn and arrogant". After a bidding war among labels, Rocky signed a record deal with Polo Grounds and RCA on October 14, a week after RCA's parent label, Sony Music, absorbed Jive, J and Arista into RCA itself. It was worth $3 million, with $1.7 million for his solo work and $1.3 million to fund his company ASAP Worldwide. Rocky said that he sought a "bigger platform" for him and his collective with the deal. His first studio album will be planned to be under the deal, but it allowed him to continue releasing mixtapes through RED Distribution.

=== Recording and production ===
In an interview with MTV, production group The Kickdrums spoke about their collaboration with Rocky and singer Lana Del Rey. They admitted that the collaboration was Fitts' one of their members' idea. Del Rey and his production background, Fitts said:

...she's a fan of hip-hop, and he's a fan of hers, and the beat managed to just kinda bring them together. That's actually the idea of this whole tape, the genre-bending that we as the KickDrums naturally do, 'cause we grew up with a bunch of different influences, like listening to everything from Nirvana and Pink Floyd, Radiohead to Dr. Dre and Jay-Z.

The track, which features Del Rey, was intended for a mixtape release to display KickDrums production. Instead, it was cut for Rocky's album after both Sony Music Group and Interscope Records enjoyed the track. KickDrums respected the decision and agreed to give the track to Rocky for his debut album. Previously, though, the unfinished song had been intentionally leaked online, and KickDrums were alarmed by the impact and attention it had already received. Rocky described Del Rey as his "dream girl", after the two co-starred in Del Rey's music video for "National Anthem", where he plays ex-president, John F. Kennedy. The track however did not make the final track list.

The song "1 Train" features an ensemble of young rappers such as Kendrick Lamar, Joey Badass, Yelawolf, Danny Brown, Action Bronson and Big K.R.I.T. Rocky has described the song as "I wanted to make a posse cut that felt like an original '90s underground track, and I didn't have to tell anyone what to do". He also said he "took it upon myself to feature all the people who I respect as artists of my generation". He also said his favorite verse is K.R.I.T.'s.

The remix to Rocky's song, "Pretty Flacko", which features Gucci Mane, Waka Flocka Flame and Pharrell Williams, was originally going to be included on the album, however it was removed due to his feud with the producer of the song SpaceGhostPurrp. It would be included for free along with the album preorder on Rocky's official website.

Additional production was handled by ASAP Ty Beats, Soufien3000, Clams Casino, Friendzone, Joey Fatts, Hector Delgado, V Don, Jonathan "MP" Williams and self-production from Rocky as Lord Flacko.

== Release and promotion ==
The album was to be officially released on September 11, 2012. Its release was pushed back to Halloween 2012, then delayed further, to the first quarter of 2013, to put finishing touches on it; copyright holders have stalled to grant permission for the use of particular samples on the album, and Rocky refuses to omit them. With MTV, Rocky said on the topic: "The issue with my album is I got things on it that's so out of this world that it's taking so long to get mastered. That's the issue, and I refuse to take anything off. It's complete. Everything is being mastered and cleared right now...It's just so hard to get things cleared, because you got to find people to clear samples."

In 2012, Rocky embarked on his Long. Live. ASAP tour with Schoolboy Q and Danny Brown. The tour was designed to promote the album when it was scheduled for a September release date.

On December 3, 2012, while premiering his video for "Fuckin Problems", ASAP announced that his album would be released on January 15, 2013. A music video for the album's title track premiered on MTV on December 23, 2012. To celebrate his album release he performed at The Hole in downtown New York City along with his group ASAP Mob. His iPhone was also stolen at the event.

== Singles ==
The album's lead single, "Goldie", was released on April 30, 2012. The song was produced by Hit-Boy. For the song, Hit-Boy wanted to play-off Rocky's laid-back style of rapping, accompanied by intentional vocal distortions, to produce a sound bordering along comatose. Beneath the beat, Hit-Boy added a reverberating chant meant to add a sinister atmosphere to the track. "Goldie" peaked at number 65 on the US Hot R&B/Hip-Hop Songs. On May 3, 2012, the music video was released for "Goldie".

On October 25, 2012, Rocky and Kendrick Lamar premiered the album's second single, "Fuckin' Problems", live on tour in Oakland, California. The song features guest appearances from rappers 2 Chainz, Kendrick Lamar and Drake. The song charted on the US Billboard Hot 100, peaking at number eight. Billboard labeled the production on the record's second single, "Fuckin' Problems", as a "new scorcher". To produce the beat, Rocky recruited Noah "40" Shebib, who co-produced it along with Drake under the pseudonym C. Papi. On December 4, 2012, the music video was released for "Fuckin' Problems" featuring 2 Chainz, Kendrick Lamar and Drake.

"Wild for the Night" was first released as the album's second promotional single on January 11, 2013. The single listed both Skrillex and Birdy Nam Nam as featured guests, although the only guest listed on the album is Skrillex who produced the track along with Birdy Nam Nam and later remixed it with Rocky as Lord Flacko. On March 26, 2013, the song was officially released to rhythmic crossover radio as the album's third single. The music video for "Wild for the Night" was released on March 26, 2013, and was shot in the Dominican Republic with Skrillex and featured cameos from the ASAP Mob. The song has since peaked at number 82 on the Billboard Hot 100.

The album's fourth and final single, "Fashion Killa", was released on June 17, 2013. On September 25, 2013, the music video for "Fashion Killa" premiered on 106 & Park. In November 2013, "Fashion Killa" was serviced to rhythmic contemporary radio in the United States.

=== Promotional singles ===
The first promotional single was the album's title track, "Long Live ASAP", which also serves as the opening track on the album. It was produced by both Jim Jonsin, Rico Love and co-produced by Finatik N Zac, Frank Romano and Rocky himself as Lord Flacko, it was released for streaming on December 20, 2012. On December 23, 2012, the music video was released for "Long Live ASAP".

=== Other songs ===
On November 1, 2013, the music video was released for "Angels". On November 13, 2013, the music video was released for "Phoenix". Dubbed as a short film, it was written by Italian actress Asia Argento along with Italian director Francesco Carrozzini; the video stars actor Michael K. Williams and model Joan Smalls.

== Critical reception ==
Professional ratings
Aggregate scores
Source	Rating
AnyDecentMusic?	7.0/10
Metacritic	75/100
Review scores
Source	Rating
AllMusic	4/5 stars
The A.V. Club	B+
Entertainment Weekly	A
The Guardian	4/5 stars
Los Angeles Times	3/4 stars
MSN Music (Expert Witness)	B+
NME	7/10
Pitchfork	8.5/10
Rolling Stone	3.5/5 stars
Spin	5/10

Long. Live. ASAP was met with generally positive reviews. At Metacritic, which assigns a normalized rating out of 100 to reviews from professional publications, the album received an average score of 75, based on 40 reviews. Aggregator AnyDecentMusic? gave it 7.0 out of 10, based on their assessment of the critical consensus.

Chris DeVille of The A.V. Club called it "an aesthetic marvel, fully realized and unmistakably distinct". Simon Vozick-Levinson of Rolling Stone wrote that it "ups the ante" musically "without losing what made the [mixtape] compelling". Pitchfork's Jayson Greene praised Rocky's "malleability", writing that he "sounds natural in every setting", and called the album "a triumph of craft and curation, preserving Rocky's immaculate taste while smartly upgrading his sound".

Kyle Anderson of Entertainment Weekly viewed that Rocky turns "radio-baller clichés ... into contagious comic relief", and Simon Price of The Independent wrote that "Rocky's rhymes are believable when reminiscing about growing up poor. And when he slides into sexism, at least he's funny with it". AllMusic's David Jeffries described him as "rap's Jim Morrison, offering an accessible, attractive, and brutish journey into darkness while remaining true to his spirit". Chris Kelly of Fact commented that he has "an ear for captivating beats whose lyrical shortcomings can be glossed over with healthy servings of charisma and panache". Lucy Jones from NME stated that "Rocky's debut is full of superb moments and offers a rich tasting menu of unique sounds". In a mixed review, Slant Magazine's Jesse Cataldo felt that the album still finds Rocky "routinely underplaying material that demands a strong anchoring presence and refusing to push his lyrical focus beyond the usual hackneyed tropes".

Alexis Petridis of The Guardian called its music "frequently thrilling", but found the lyrics occasionally "boring". David Amidon from PopMatters found it relatively "safe" compared to other "cloud rap" offerings and stated, "He's still a great talent vocally, but it remains to be seen if he can match his voice with his pen". Andrew Nosnitsky of Spin found Rocky's lyrics superficial and clichéd, writing that "there's no personal narrative or identity here to compensate for the hollowness of his craft". Writing for MSN Music, Robert Christgau said "the beat hooks" only on "six highly listenable, casually unmatched tracks" and wrote of Rocky, "Skillfully but never dazzlingly, congenially but never charismatically, with entertainment value added by a screwed-and-chopped alter ego, Rocky raps over the music without saying a damn thing older, meaner, and sharper rappers haven't said before".

=== Rankings ===
Long. Live. ASAP was named the seventh best hip-hop album of 2013 by Exclaim!. Complex ranked it at number 19 on their list of the 50 best albums of 2013. Pigeons & Planes positioned it at number 25 on their list of the best albums of 2013. Pitchfork placed it at number 39 on their list of the 50 best albums of 2013.

== Commercial performance ==
Long. Live. ASAP debuted at number one on the US Billboard 200, with 139,000 album-equivalent units and 139,000 copies in pure album sales in its first week. As of April 17, 2013, the album had sold 312,000 copies in the United States. As of April 30, 2015, the album has sold 518,000 in the United States. On October 16, 2019, the album was certified double platinum by the Recording Industry Association of America (RIAA) for shipments of 2,000,000 units in the United States.

== Track listing ==
Long. Live. ASAP track listing
No.	Title	Writer(s)	Producer(s)	Length
1.	"Long Live ASAP"	Rakim Mayers; James Scheffer; Richard Butler, Jr.; Michael Mule; Issac Deboni; Frank Romano; Laura Jane Lowther	Jim Jonsin; Rico Love; Finatik N Zac^{[a]}; Romano^{[a]}; Lord Flacko^{[a]}	4:49
2.	"Goldie"	Mayers; Chauncey Hollis	Hit-Boy	3:12
3.	"PMW (All I Really Need)" (featuring Schoolboy Q)	Mayers; Quincy Hanley; Tyler Williams; Nikhil Seetharam	T-Minus; Seetharam^{[a]}	3:54
4.	"LVL"	Mayers; Michael Volpe	Clams Casino	3:40
5.	"Hell" (featuring Santigold)	Mayers; Volpe; Santi White	Clams Casino	3:51
6.	"Pain" (featuring Overdoz)	Mayers; Khalid Muhammed; Jess Willard; Soufien Rhouat	Soufien3000	3:53
7.	"Fuckin' Problems" (featuring Drake, 2 Chainz and Kendrick Lamar)	Mayers; Aubrey Graham; Kendrick Duckworth; Tauheed Epps; Noah Shebib; Stephen Garrett	40; C. Papi^{[a]}	3:53
8.	"Wild for the Night" (featuring Skrillex and Birdy Nam Nam)	Mayers; Sonny Moore; Mickael Dalmoro; Denis Lebouvier; Thomas Parent; Julien Pradeyrol; Nicolas Vadon	Birdy Nam Nam; Skrillex (Remixed by Skrillex, Lord Flacko)	3:29
9.	"1 Train" (featuring Kendrick Lamar, Joey Badass, Yelawolf, Danny Brown, Action Bronson and Big K.R.I.T.)	Mayers; Ariyan Asllani; Michael Atha; Duckworth; Hollis; Daniel Sewell; Justin Scott; Jo-Vaughn Virginie; Assala Nasri	Hit-Boy	6:12
10.	"Fashion Killa"	Mayers; Hector Delgado; James Laurence; Dylan Reznick; Terius Nash; Christopher Stewart	Delgado; Lord Flacko; Friendzone^{[a]}	3:56
11.	"Phoenix"	Mayers; Brian Burton	Danger Mouse	3:53
12.	"Suddenly"	Mayers; Delgado; Tyshaun "ASAP Ty Beats" Holloway; Curtis Williams	Delgado; Lord Flacko; ASAP Ty Beats^{[a]}	4:30
Total length:				49:15

Deluxe edition (bonus tracks)
No.	Title	Writer(s)	Producer(s)	Length
13.	"Jodye"	Mayers	Joey Fatts; Lord Flacko; Delgado^{[b]}	4:20
14.	"Ghetto Symphony" (featuring Gunplay and ASAP Ferg)	Mayers; Richard Morales, Jr.; Jonathan Williams; Darold Ferguson; Guy Sigsworth; Imogen Heap; Peter Chill; Tivon "V Don" Key	V Don; Lord Flacko; Jonathan "MP" Williams^{[b]}	3:57
15.	"Angels"	Mayers; Clarence Connor; Dayquan Davis; Heap; Solomon Davis	Amsterdam	3:48
16.	"I Come Apart" (featuring Florence Welch)	Mayers; Florence Welch; Emile Haynie; Amanda Gosein; John Stephens	Haynie; Amanda Ghost^{[a]}	3:37
Total length:				61:25

Official website pre-order bonus track
No.	Title	Writer(s)	Producer(s)	Length
17.	"Pretty Flacko" (remix; featuring Gucci Mane, Waka Flocka Flame and Pharrell)	Mayers; Radric Davis; Juaquin Malphurs; Pharrell Williams; Markese Rolle	SpaceGhostPurrp	4:17

Japan iTunes and streaming bonus track
No.	Title	Writer(s)	Producer(s)	Length
17.	"Purple Swag" (remix; featuring Paul Wall, Bun B and Killa Kyleon)	Mayers; Paul Slayton; Bernard Freeman; Holloway; Kyle Riley	ASAP Ty Beats	4:12

Notes

- ^{^[a]} signifies a co-producer
- ^{^[b]} signifies an additional producer
- "LVL" features uncredited vocals from American indie rock band Haim

Sample credits

- "Fuckin' Problems" contains a sample of "Don't Be Jealous", performed by Aaliyah and written by Static Major; and an interpolation of "Shimmy Shimmy Ya", performed by Ol' Dirty Bastard.
- "1 Train" contains a sample of "Senen", written and performed by Assala Nasri.
- "Fashion Killa" contains a sample of "Mr. Yeah", written by Terius Nash and Christopher "Tricky" Stewart, and performed by The-Dream.
- "Jodye" contains a sample of "Destruction" (from the Breath of Fire IV soundtrack), performed by Yoshino Aoki.
- "Ghetto Symphony" contains a sample of "Psychobabble", written by Guy Sigsworth, Imogen Heap and Peter Chill, and performed by Frou Frou.
- "Angels" contains a sample of "Headlock", written and performed by Imogen Heap.

== Personnel ==
Credits for Long. Live. ASAP adapted from AllMusic.

- 2 Chainz – featured artist
- ASAP Ty Beats – producer
- Virgil Abloh – creative director
- Action Bronson – featured artist
- Derek "MixedByAli" Ali – engineer
- ASAP Rocky – executive producer, primary artist
- Joey Badass – featured artist
- Mark Bengston – engineer
- Big K.R.I.T. – featured artist
- Birdy Nam Nam – engineer
- Danny Brown – featured artist
- Jack "Sutherfolk" Brown – engineer
- Nathan Burgess – assistant
- Noel Cadastre – assistant
- Noel "Gadget" Campbell – mixing
- Clams Casino – producer
- Kyauna Clarke – background vocals
- Tom Coyne – mastering
- Danger Mouse – drums, organ, piano, producer, string arrangements, synthesizer
- Mike Dean – mixing
- Hector Delgado – editing, engineer, mixing, producer, scratching
- Drake – featured artist
- Finatik – keyboards, producer, programming
- Vanessa Freebairn-Smith – strings
- Friendzone – producer
- Gee Bizzy – assistant
- Erwin Gorostiza – creative director
- Matthew Henson – stylist
- Hit-Boy – producer
- Matt Huber – assistant
- Stuart Innis – assistant
- Chace Johnson – executive producer
- Jim Jonsin – keyboards, producer, programming
- Kennie Takahashi – engineer
- Phil Knott – photography
- Kendrick Lamar – featured artist
- Bryan Leach – executive producer
- Luke Leveille – assistant
- Lord Flacko – producer, remixing
- Rico Love – producer
- Laura Jane Lowther – background vocals
- Daniel Lynas – engineer
- Robert Marks – mixing
- Nikolas Marzouca – engineer
- Todd Monfalcone – engineer, mixing
- Overdoz – featured artist
- Para One – mixing
- Joe Perez – art direction, design
- Dave Pettit – assistant
- Dana Richard – assistant
- Steven "ASAP Yams" Rodriguez – executive producer
- Frank Romano – producer
- Santigold – featured artist
- Schoolboy Q – featured artist
- Nikhil Seetharam – producer
- Noah "40" Shebib – engineer, featured artist, instrumentation, producer
- Geno Sims – executive producer
- Skrillex – featured artist, producer, remixing
- Kathleen Sloan – strings
- Soufien 3000 – producer
- T-Minus – producer
- Nate Walcott – preparation
- Finis "KY" White – engineer
- Mike Whitson – strings
- Alwyn Wright – strings
- Yelawolf – featured artist

== Charts ==
=== Weekly charts ===
2013–2022 chart performance for Long. Live. ASAP
Chart (2013–2022)	Peak position
Australian Albums (ARIA)	7
Austrian Albums (Ö3 Austria)	62
Belgian Albums (Ultratop Flanders)	34
Belgian Albums (Ultratop Wallonia)	98
Canadian Albums (Billboard)	1
Danish Albums (Hitlisten)	4
Dutch Albums (Album Top 100)	45
Finnish Albums (Suomen virallinen lista)	18
French Albums (SNEP)	21
German Albums (Offizielle Top 100)	31
New Zealand Albums (RMNZ)	7
Norwegian Albums (VG-lista)	31
Polish Albums (ZPAV)	46
Portuguese Albums (AFP)	44
Swiss Albums (Schweizer Hitparade)	9
UK Albums (Official Charts)	7
UK R&B Albums (Official Charts)	1
US Billboard 200	1
US Top R&B/Hip-Hop Albums (Billboard)	1

2026 chart performance for Long. Live. ASAP
Chart (2026)	Peak position
Greek Albums (IFPI)	59

=== Year-end charts ===
2013 year-end chart performance for Long. Live. ASAP
Chart (2013)	Position
UK Albums (OCC)	194
US Billboard 200	60
US Top R&B/Hip-Hop Albums (Billboard)	15

2014 year-end chart performance for Long. Live. ASAP
Chart (2014)	Position
US Top R&B/Hip-Hop Albums (Billboard)	60

2025 year-end chart performance for Long. Live. ASAP
Chart (2025)	Position
US Top R&B/Hip-Hop Albums (Billboard)	94

== Certifications ==
Certifications and sales for Long. Live. ASAP
Region	Certification	Certified units/sales
Australia (ARIA)	Gold	35,000^{‡}
Canada (Music Canada)	Gold	40,000^{^}
Denmark (IFPI Danmark)	2× Platinum	40,000^{‡}
Germany (BVMI)	Gold	100,000^{‡}
Poland (ZPAV)	2× Platinum	40,000^{‡}
Sweden (GLF)	Gold	20,000^{‡}
United Kingdom (BPI)	Gold	100,000^{‡}
United States (RIAA)	2× Platinum	2,000,000^{‡}
^{^} Shipments figures based on certification alone.^{‡} Sales+streaming figures based on certification alone.

== See also ==
- List of number-one albums of 2013 (Canada)
- List of Billboard 200 number-one albums of 2013
- List of Billboard number-one R&B/hip-hop albums of 2013
- List of Billboard number-one rap albums of 2013
- List of UK R&B Albums Chart number ones of 2013
