= Victoria's Secret Swim Special =

- Genre: Television special
- Directed by: Hamish Hamilton
- Starring: Victoria's Secret Angels and models
- Country of origin: United States
- Original language: English

Production
- Executive producers: Hamish Hamilton; Edward G. Razek; Ian Stewart
- Producer: Done and Dusted
- Production location: Puerto Rico
- Running time: 60 minutes

Original release
- Network: CBS
- Release: February 26, 2015 – March 9, 2016

The Victoria's Secret Swim Special is a television special that aired on CBS on February 26, 2015 and was broadcast in 190 countries as well as live at the Victoria's Secret website. It cost $2 million to film.

It featured the Victoria's Secret Angels Adriana Lima, Alessandra Ambrosio, Behati Prinsloo, Candice Swanepoel and Lily Aldridge as well as models Joan Smalls, Elsa Hosk, Jasmine Tookes, Martha Hunt, Stella Maxwell and Jac Jagaciak. There were also musical performances by Maroon 5 and Juanes.

Another 'Victoria's Secret Swim Special' aired on March 9, 2016, featuring the Victoria's Secret models and musical performances by Demi Lovato and Nick Jonas.

== Background ==
Every year Victoria's Secret Angels and models shoot the swimsuit campaign. At the end of 2014, after the annual fashion show, some of them posted pictures on Instagram announcing an upcoming secret project. After rumors of a fashion show featuring the swimsuit line, it turned out being a television special.

It does not feature all of the shoots of Victoria's Secret's 2015 swimsuit collection. Indeed, some pictures were taken at Saint Barthélemy, including some models who are not featured on the television special.

One of the models, Joan Smalls, was born in Puerto Rico and lived there for 19 years.

Then Angel Karlie Kloss was not featured in the broadcast, fueling speculation that she had left the brand, which Edward Razek would later confirm. However, later the same year, all the featured models in the broadcast aside from Smalls would be revealed as part of the brand's newest Angels.

== Synopsis ==
The Victoria's Secret Swim Special shows Angels and models shooting the Victoria's Secret swimsuit catalogue, including underwater shoots. They also talk about their lives and careers, dance to the songs performed by Maroon 5 and Juanes and are said to "tackle jungle treks, underwater shoots and overcome personal fears".

== 2015 ==
The first edition of the Victoria's Secret Swim Special was filmed in Puerto Rico in December 2014 and premiered on February 26, 2015.

=== Angels ===
- Adriana Lima
- Alessandra Ambrosio
- Candice Swanepoel
- Behati Prinsloo
- Lily Aldridge
- Elsa Hosk
- Jasmine Tookes
- Martha Hunt
- Stella Maxwell
- Jac Jagaciak

=== Models ===
- Joan Smalls

=== Music performers ===
Artist	Song
Maroon 5	"Sugar" and "Animals"
Juanes	"Juntos (Together)"

== 2016 ==
The second edition of the Victoria's Secret Swim Special took place in St. Barthélemy and premiered on March 9, 2016.

=== Angels ===
- Behati Prinsloo
- Candice Swanepoel
- Lily Aldridge
- Lais Ribeiro
- Elsa Hosk
- Jasmine Tookes
- Martha Hunt
- Sara Sampaio
- Stella Maxwell
- Taylor Marie Hill
- Romee Strijd
- Josephine Skriver

=== Models ===
- Vita Sidorkina

=== Music performers ===
Artist	Song
Demi Lovato	"Cool for the Summer", "For You" and "Confident"
Nick Jonas	"Levels", "Chains" and "Jealous"

== Reception ==
Kate Dries from website Jezebel compared the Victoria's Secret Swim Special to Jurassic Park and the upcoming Jurassic World.

As for Alyssa Bailey from fashion magazine Elle, found the opening of the Victoria's Secret Swim Special was similar to that of The Hills.

The A.V. Club qualified it "unbearable".
