= LVL (song) =

2013 song by ASAP Rocky

Song by ASAP Rocky

from the album Long. Live. ASAP
- Released: January 15, 2013
- Recorded: 2012
- Genre: Cloud rap; experimental hip hop; psychedelia
- Length: 3:40
- Label: ASAP Worldwide; Polo Grounds; RCA
- Songwriters: Rakim Mayers; Michael Volpe
- Producer: Clams Casino

"LVL" is a song by American hip hop recording artist ASAP Rocky, taken from Rocky's debut studio album Long. Live. ASAP (2013). The song, produced by Clams Casino, it contains a sample of "Amazing Thailand 01 (Demo)" by Discovery Sound. The song marks their fifth collaboration, following "Bass", "Wassup", "Leaf", and "Demons" from Rocky's 2011 mixtape Live. Love. ASAP. In mid 2023, the song gained a viral resurgence on the video app TikTok with over 237,000 posts made using the song.

== Critical reception ==
"LVL" was met with generally positive reviews from music critics. Los Angeles Times praised the production, dubbing it "gorgeously fractured" and how "wouldn’t feel out of place on a record by Brian Eno or Aphex Twin". Fact called it one of the album's strongest efforts.

== Charts ==
Chart (2013)	Peak position
US Hot R&B/Hip-Hop Songs (Billboard)	50

Chart (2026)	Peak position
Lithuania (AGATA)	69

== Certifications ==
Region	Certification	Certified units/sales
New Zealand (RMNZ)	Platinum	30,000^{‡}
United States (RIAA)	Platinum	1,000,000^{‡}
^{‡} Sales+streaming figures based on certification alone.

== Release history ==
Country	Date	Format	Label
United States	January 15, 2013	Digital download	Polo Grounds, RCA
