= Shroom Clouds =

2026 single by ASAP Rocky featuring reggie and Jeremih

Single by ASAP Rocky featuring Reggie and Jeremih
- Released: October 16, 2026
- Genre: Hip-hop
- Length: 3:15
- Label: ASAP Worldwide
- Songwriters: Rakim Mayers; Hector Delgado; Kevin Arcilla; Reginald Helms Jr.; Jeremy Felton
- Producers: ASAP Rocky; Hector Delgado; Kevin Arcilla

ASAP Rocky singles chronology
"Stay Here 4 Life" (2026)	"Shroom Clouds" (2026)

Reggie singles chronology
"2b" (2026)	"Shroom Clouds" (2026)

Jeremih singles chronology
"Do Too Much" (2026)	"Shroom Clouds" (2026)

Music video
- "Shroom Clouds" on YouTube

"Shroom Clouds" is a song by American rapper ASAP Rocky featuring rapper Reggie and American singer Jeremih. Rocky performed the song at Weedmaps' 420 event and the Governors Ball Music Festival in 2021, as well as during his Amazon Music Live set in 2022, before it was released on October 16, 2026.

== Composition ==
The song features "trippy" and "woozy" production and pitch-shifted vocals. Both Reggie and Jeremih contribute melodic vocals to the song; Reggie sings the chorus and bridge, while Jeremih provides the outro.

== Music video ==
The music video was released on October 19, 2026. It was directed by ASAP Rocky, Aisultan Seitov and Pietro Biz Biasia. The visual depicts Rocky's drug-induced hallucinations, as they take him to a wonderland of natural landscapes above the clouds. Rocky dons a yellow hat and is surrounded by women, socializing with them during a picnic and lying alongside them in the middle of a grassy field. After taking another drag and passing the blunt to an old lady knitting on a park bench, Rocky transports back to New York City, where he has been sitting on a stoop all along.

== Charts ==
Chart performance for "Shroom Clouds"
Chart (2026)	Peak position
New Zealand Hot Singles (RMNZ)	27
US Hot R&B/Hip-Hop Songs (Billboard)	42
