= Feel the Fiyaaaah =

2022 song by Metro Boomin and ASAP Rocky featuring Takeoff

Song by Metro Boomin and ASAP Rocky featuring Takeoff

from the album Heroes & Villains
- Released: December 2, 2022
- Genre: Gangsta rap; trap
- Length: 3:09
- Label: Boominati; Republic
- Songwriters: Leland Wayne; Rakim Mayers; Kirshnik Ball; Stephen Bruner; Robert Bryson
- Producers: Metro Boomin; Thundercat

"Feel the Fiyaaaah" is a song by American record producer Metro Boomin and American rapper A$AP Rocky featuring late fellow American rapper Takeoff, from the former's second studio album Heroes & Villains (2022). The song was written by the artists alongside bassist Thundercat, with additional writing credits going to Peabo Bryson for the sampling of his song "Feel the Fire".

== Critical reception ==
The song was met with a generally positive reception. Robin Murray of Clash wrote that it seems to encapsulate the album's "over-the-top ambitions, while a feature from the late, great Takeoff is swathed in a sense of loss." Slant Magazine's Charles Lyons-Burt criticized the production, writing that "Metro is often just going about recycling what's worked on tracks that he's produced in the past" and regarding the song's pitched-up sample as reminiscent of his song "Runnin", but also commented that the song features "committed" performances from ASAP Rocky and Takeoff. Mic Cheque's Hamza Riaz wrote in a review of Heroes & Villains, "There's no sensational beat that holds a candle to production like Without Warning's "Rap Saved Me" or the layers of "Don't Come Out the House", citing "Feel the Fiyaaaah" as one of the "closest moments". Wongo Okon of Uproxx wrote, "In totality, the flashy 'Feel The Fiyaaah' with ASAP Rocky and the late Takeoff exemplifies the album's brightest moments". Complex's Peter A. Berry praised the rappers' performances, writing that Rocky "laces throwback chipmunk soul with an off-kilter melody that works better than you think" and "On the same track, the late Takeoff cycles through much of the alphabet for a wordplay exhibition that will remind you of the massive talent that was lost after his tragic death last month."

== Charts ==
Chart performance for "Feel the Fiyaaaah"
Chart (2022)	Peak position
Canada Hot 100 (Billboard)	24
Global 200 (Billboard)	83
US Billboard Hot 100	59
US Hot R&B/Hip-Hop Songs (Billboard)	23
