= PMW (All I Really Need) =

Song by ASAP Rocky featuring Schoolboy Q

from the album Long. Live. ASAP
- Released: January 15, 2013
- Recorded: 2012
- Genre: Trap
- Length: 3:54
- Label: ASAP Worldwide; Polo Grounds; RCA
- Songwriters: Rakim Mayers; Quincy Hanley; Tyler Williams; Nikhil Seetharam
- Producers: T-Minus; Nikhil Seetharam (co.)

"PMW (All I Really Need)" is a song by American hip hop recording artist ASAP Rocky, taken from Rocky's debut studio album Long. Live. ASAP (2013). The song, produced by T-Minus alongside Nikhil Seetharam, features a guest appearance from Rocky's frequent collaborator and fellow American rapper Schoolboy Q. The song marks their third collaboration, with the first being "Brand New Guy", from Rocky's 2011 mixtape Live. Love. ASAP, followed by "Hands on the Wheel", featured on Q's 2012 project Habits & Contradictions. Upon the release of the album, high downloads resulted in the song peaking at number 14 on the US Billboard Bubbling Under Hot 100 Singles chart.

== Background ==
On August 3, 2012, an unfinished tagged version of the song, without Schoolboy Q, was leaked titled "Pussy Money Weed", which was included on a DJ Clue mixtape. On December 18, the song was leaked along with the rest of Long. Live. ASAP. Schoolboy Q has also said him and Rocky might release a collaborative album together, due to their chemistry.

== Critical reception ==
"PMW (All I Really Need)" was met with generally positive reviews from music critics. The New Zealand Herald named the song one of his greatest hits. The Guardian called the song a fantastic moment of the album, praising Schoolboy Q's hurtle rhymes. The A.V. Club also praised Q's guest appearance as show stealing. XXL said the song re-captures the chemistry between Q and Rocky found in previous collaborations “Brand New Guy” and “Hands on the Wheel,” which "ends up as an entertaining heavy hitter." Drowned In Sound would praise the song's production. However NME put down the song as having predictable misogynistic lyric themes. Fact said the three words that stand for "PMW", pussy, money, weed, basically describe the whole album's lyrical thrust.

== Chart performance ==
Chart (2013)	Peak position
US Bubbling Under Hot 100 (Billboard)	14
US Hot R&B/Hip-Hop Songs (Billboard)	39

== Certifications ==
Region	Certification	Certified units/sales
United States (RIAA)	Gold	500,000^{‡}
^{‡} Sales+streaming figures based on certification alone.

== Release history ==
Country	Date	Format	Label
United States	January 15, 2013	Digital download	Polo Grounds, RCA
