= Joan Smalls =

Puerto Rican model (born 1988)

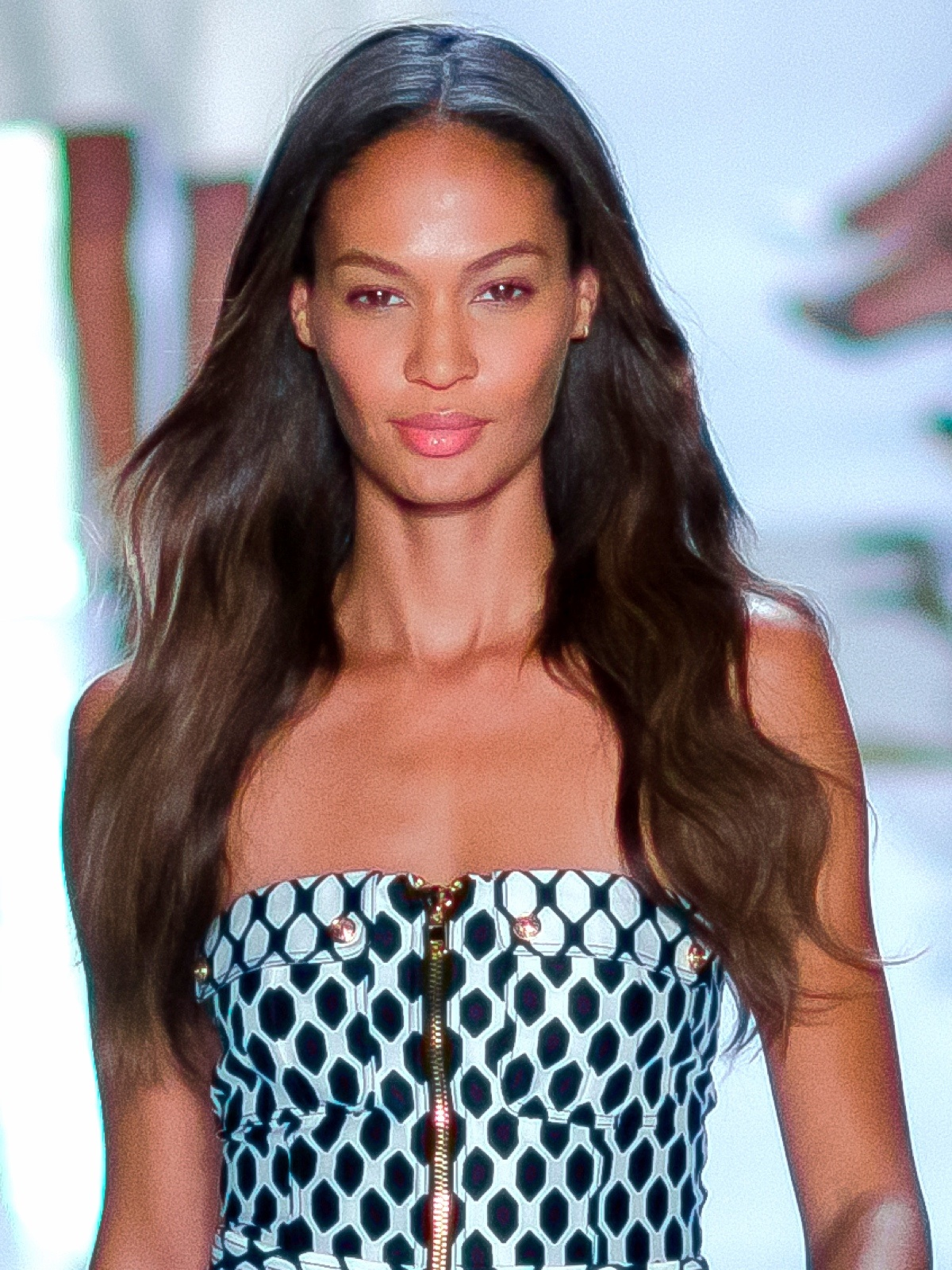
- Smalls in 2013
- Born: Joan Smalls Rodriguez; July 11, 1988 (age 38); Hatillo, Puerto Rico
- Education: Interamerican University of Puerto Rico (BA)
- Occupations: Model, television personality
- Years active: 2007–present
- Modeling information
- Height: 5 ft 10 1/2 in (1.79 m)
- Hair color: Brown
- Eye color: Brown (EU) 83-61-87
- Agency: IMG Models

Joan Smalls Rodriguez (born July 11, 1988) is a Puerto Rican model and television personality. In 2011, she became the first Latina model to represent Estée Lauder cosmetics. In 2013, she entered Forbes magazine's "World's Highest-Paid Models" list for the first time, ranking at number eight with over $3 million in earnings, In January 2014, Smalls appeared on the "Return of the Supermodel" cover of American Elle. In 2012, Smalls was ranked the number #1 model in the world by Models.com.

== Early life and education ==
Joan Smalls Rodríguez was born and raised in Hatillo, Puerto Rico, with her two sisters. Her father, Eric Smalls, is an accountant, and is West Indian, of African and Irish heritage, from Saint Thomas. Smalls' mother, Betzaida Rodríguez, is a social worker, who is Puerto Rican, and of Spanish and Taíno heritage. Rodríguez also has distant Irish and Indian ancestry. Smalls initially became interested in modeling as a teenager, entering local competitions. She met with a New York agency who told her she would have to correct her teeth in order to succeed; during that time she went to college. Smalls graduated magna cum laude from the Interamerican University of Puerto Rico with a bachelor's degree in psychology. Upon graduation, she moved to New York City to begin her modeling career.

== Career ==
=== Modeling ===
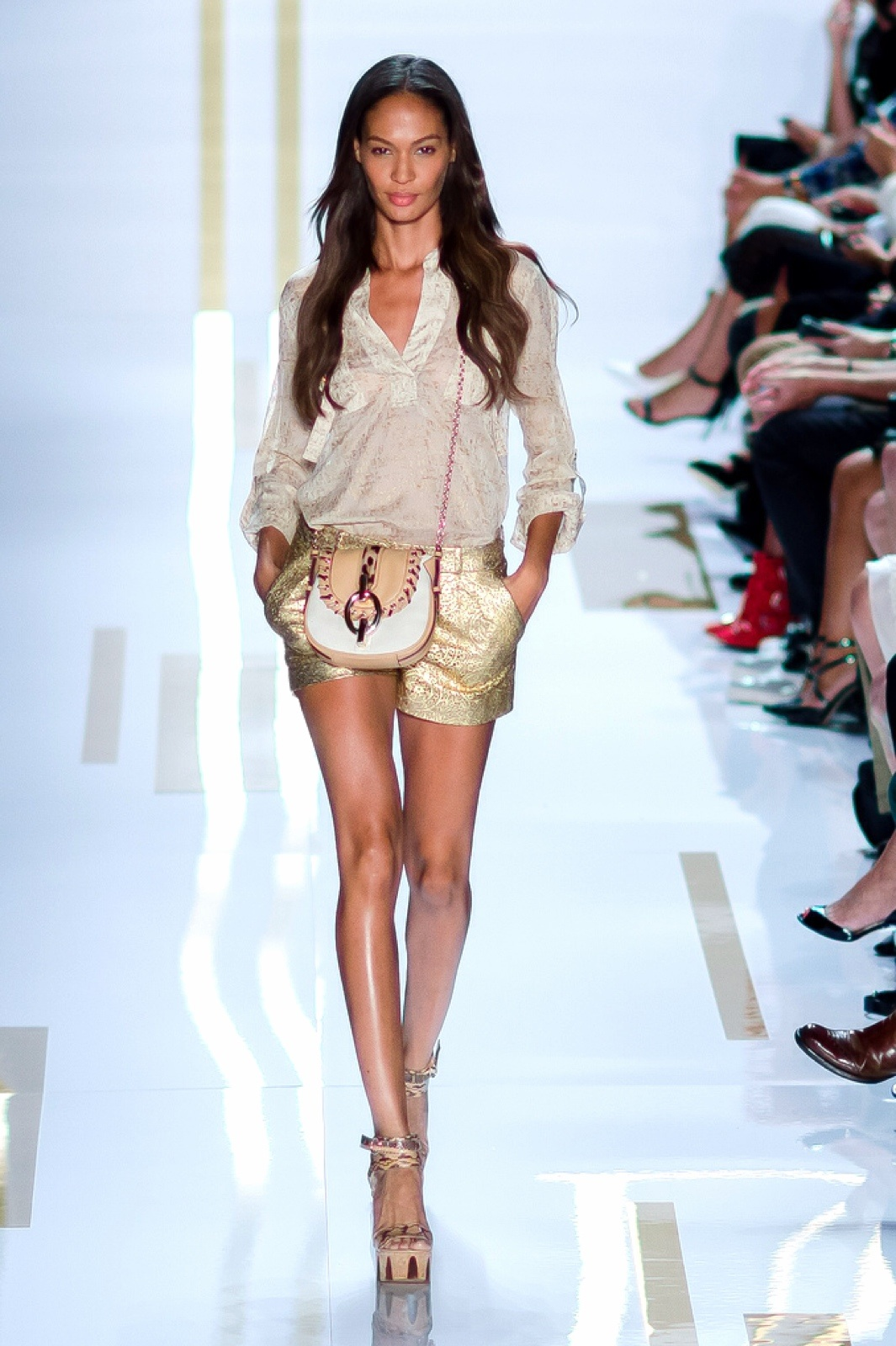
Smalls on the runway for DVF, 2014 New York Fashion Week

She was signed by Elite Model Management in 2007, and did commercial modeling jobs such as Nordstrom, Liz Claiborne, and Sass & bide. In 2009, she left Elite and switched to IMG Models worldwide, where she changed her focus to runway work. She was chosen as a Givenchy exclusive for Riccardo Tisci's Spring/Summer haute couture show in January 2010, and her modeling career gained traction.

Since working for Givenchy, Smalls has modeled haute couture and ready-to-wear collections for top designers and fashion houses such as Chanel, Prada, Gucci, Marc Jacobs, Tom Ford, Isabel Marant, Burberry, Moschino, Miu Miu, Bottega Veneta, Lanvin, Missoni, Chloé, Alexander Wang, Versace, Balenciaga, Yves Saint Laurent, Louis Vuitton, Hermès, Jean Paul Gaultier, Balmain, Fendi, Dior, DSquared², Valentino, Oscar De La Renta, DVF, Tommy Hilfiger, Anna Sui, Stella McCartney and many more. She has appeared in shows for fashion week in New York, London, Milan, and Paris. In 2010, Smalls began modeling for Victoria's Secret and has appeared in their 2011, 2012, 2013, 2014, 2015, 2016, 2024, 2025, and 2026 Victoria's Secret Fashion Show.

She has appeared in editorials for several international editions of Vogue, Harpers Bazaar, i-D, GQ, Dazed & Confused, Elle, Industrie, Interview, American and Spanish V, Glamour and W. Her international covers include the Italian, American, Australian, Japanese, Turkish, Brazilian, Mexican, Latin American, Korean, Russian, Spanish, and German editions of Vogue; the British, French, Dutch, South African, Turkish, Belgium, Italian and American editions of Elle; the South African, Mexican, Latin American and British editions of GQ; and the American, British, Japanese, Brazilian, Kazakhstan, Bulgarian, Dutch, Thai, Czech, Singaporean, Malaysian, Argentine, Vietnamese, Taiwanese, German, Spanish, Korean, Latin American, Mexican, Indian, Arabian and Greek editions of Harper's Bazaar. She has appeared on the cover of Numéro, W, W Korea, Lui, Porter, Garage, Lucky, Dazed & Confused, Glam Belleza Latina, The Last Magazine, V, 10, Madame Figaro, Self, Grazia, The Edit, The Impression, Caras, ES Magazine, WSJ, POP, i-D, 032c, Narcisse, Documentary Beauty, WWD, Glamour, Stylist and CR Fashion Book. In September 2013, Smalls and fellow model Karlie Kloss appeared on a feature of Vanity Fair, which dubbed them "The New Supers". She appeared in the 2012 and 2014 Pirelli Calendar. She also featured on the cover of American Vogue's September 2014 issue. In 2018, Joan Smalls was featured as one of the CR Calendar Girls representing the month of February, in CR Fashion Book's first ever calendar. She was styled by Carine Roitfeld, editor-in-chief of CR Fashion Book & fashion stylist and shot by photographer Steven Klein.

Smalls has been photographed by fashion photographers such as Steven Meisel, Mert and Marcus, Steven Klein, Mario Sorrenti, Mario Testino, Peter Lindbergh, Patrick Demarchelier, Nick Knight, Karl Lagerfeld, Annie Leibovitz, Craig McDean, Hans Feurer, Terry Richardson, David Sims, Inez & Vinoodh, Norman Jean Roy, Camilla Akrans, Henry Dingo, Alasdair McLellan, Ellen Von Unwerth, Emma Summerton, Josh Olins, Mikael Jansson, Daniel Jackson, Tom Munro, Willy Vanderperre, Michael Thompson, Gilles Bensimon, Luigi Murenu, Daniele + Iango, Sean & Seng, Sebastian Faena, Sølve Sundsbø, Giampaolo Sgura, Cass Bird, Roe Ethridge, Richard Bush, Cedric Buchet, Daniel Zaretsky, Henrique Gendre, Txema Yeste, Victor Demarchelier, Boo George, Matt Jones, Russell James, Charlotte Wales, Chris Colls, Todd Hido, Jason Kibbler, Greg Kadel, Marcus Ohlsson, Carter Smith, Sebastian Kim, Vivian Sassen, Cuneyt Akeroglu, Luigi & Iango, Zee Nunes, Matthew Welch, Greg Swales, Luke Gilford, Brigitte Lacombe, Mariano Vivanco, Glen Luchford and Lachlan Bailey.

Smalls is the first Puerto Rican fashion model chosen by brands to front their advertising campaigns, including Gucci, Gucci Eyewear, Chanel, Fendi, Fendi eyewear, Versace, Versace Eyewear, Balmain, Calvin Klein Jeans, Givenchy, Givenchy Eyewear, Roberto Cavalli, Lacoste, Gap, J Crew, Ralph Lauren, Studio W., Neiman Marcus, Barneys New York, Bloomingdale's, Free People, W Hotels, Mercedes-Benz, Next, Ogilvy, Target, Smartwater, Hanes x Karla, H&M, Katie Grand for Hogan, ICB, Smart & Sexy, Americana Manhasset, La Maison Simons, True Religion, Giambattista Valli, David Yurman, Estée Lauder, Ports 1961, Rag & Bone, Prabal Gurung, Hugo Boss, Hugo Boss Eyewear, Tiffany & Co., Alexander Wang, Stella McCartney, Missoni, and Missoni Eyewear, Stuart Weitzman, United Colors of Benetton, Calvin Klein Underwear, Joe Fresh, Replay, Moschino, Liu·Jo, Liu·Jo eyewear, Karl Lagerfeld, Bottega Veneta, Bottega Veneta Eyewear, Dsquared², Etam, Animale, Brandon Maxwell, Michael Kors, Marc Jacobs, Miu Miu Cruise, Tom Ford, Tom Ford Eyewear and Jimmy Choo.

In late 2017, Jeremy Scott, creative director of the fashion house Moschino, unveiled Joan Smalls as the new face for the new Moschino fragrance, Fresh Couture Gold, shot by Giampaolo Sgura. This marked Joan Smalls first fragrance campaign.

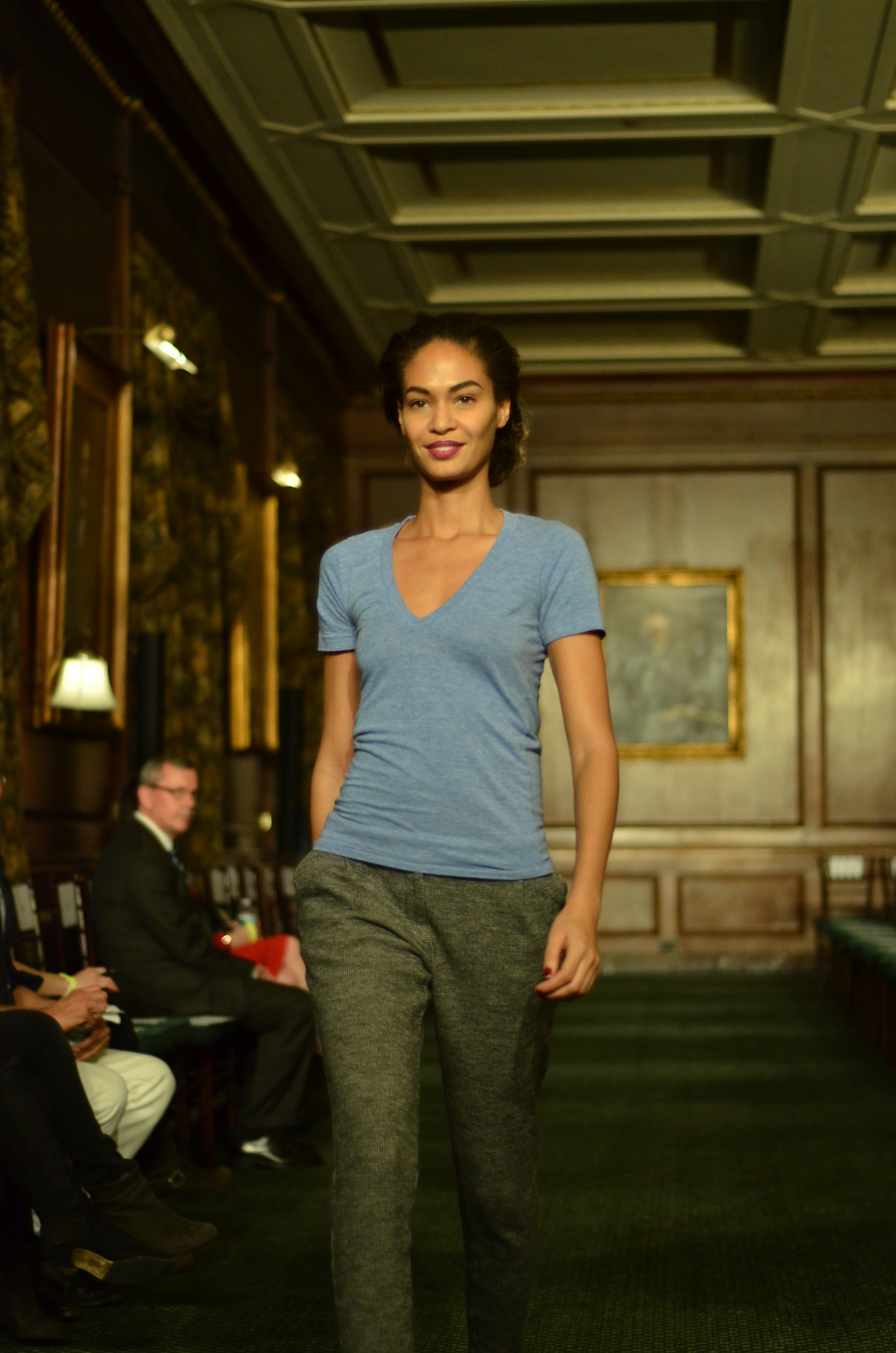
Smalls in 2012

In September 2012, Smalls was named "Model of the Year" at the 9th Annual "Style Awards". Supermodel Iman presented Smalls with the award. In 2013, Smalls ranked #8 on Forbes magazine's "World's Highest-Paid Models" list, earning an estimated $3.5 million.

In September 2012, Smalls was ranked #1 on the "Top 50 Models" list by Models.com. (Note: The list system has since gone alphabetical rather than ranking numerically. Smalls has been the last model to reach number one before that change.) She remained at the top of the list until August 2014, when the site named her as one of the "New Supers". In January 2014, Smalls appeared on the cover of American Elle and was featured in the article "The Return of the Supermodel: It's Joan Smalls".

=== Cosmetic contracts ===
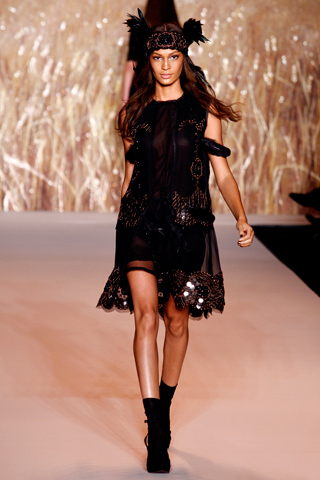
Joan Smalls for Anna Sui Spring/Summer 2011.

In 2011, Estée Lauder signed Smalls to its line-up of global beauty ambassadors. She is the first Latina signed to a worldwide campaign for the brand. Richard Ferretti, Estée Lauder's global creative director stated, "The word supermodel is overused, but if there's any woman of our generation who deserves the title, it's Joan. She can go from looking girl-next-door to superchic-tough-strong—and she is all of that."

In 2015, Smalls teamed up with Estée Lauder to create 12 New Matte Lipsticks for the cosmetics giant. The Supermodel provided inspiration for the 12 new shades, including a broad selection of reds, pinks, chocolatey browns and a dark burgundy (all permanent additions to the Estée Lauder line).

=== Television and media ===
Smalls served as co-host (along with model Karlie Kloss) of the MTV fashion series House of Style. She was featured alongside singer Bruno Mars in the June 2011 edition of Vogue. In 2006 she appeared in Ricky Martin's "It's Alright" music video. In November 2013, she co-starred with actor Michael K. Williams in the music video and short film for the American rapper ASAP Rocky's track "Phoenix", written by Asia Argento and Francesco Carrozzini and directed by Carrozzini. In 2013, she appeared in Beyoncé's "Yoncé" video. In 2017, she appeared as a guest judge on the ninth season of the reality competition RuPaul's Drag Race.

=== Design ===
In 2015, Smalls designed a denim collection, Joan Smalls x True Religion. Photographer Steven Klein shot Smalls for the True Religion collection ad campaign. In 2017, Smalls teamed up with the Smart and Sexy brand, to create a line of lingerie and swimwear to be sold at Walmart.

=== Awards and nominations ===
| Year | Award | Category | Work | Outcome |
|---|---|---|---|---|
| 2012 | Style Awards | Model of the Year | Numerous | Won |

== Philanthropy ==
Smalls is involved with a non-profit organization called Project Sunshine, where she helps children with medical needs. Smalls was part of the ‘Jeans for Refugees’ campaign, a Johny Dar project and artistic fundraising initiative dedicated to helping refugees around the world, with all proceeds going to the International Rescue Committee. She has also been involved with The Garden of Dreams Foundation, a non-profit organization that works with The Madison Square Garden Company and MSG Networks, Inc. to positively impact the lives of children facing obstacles.

== Personal life ==
As of July 2018, she was dating entrepreneur Bernard Smith. They had dated since 2011.

== Filmography ==
=== Film ===
| Year | Title | Role | Director |
|---|---|---|---|
| 2017 | John Wick: Chapter 2 | Continental Female Assassin | Chad Stahelski |
| 2018 | Set It Up | Suze | Claire Scanlon |

=== Television ===
| Year | Title | Role | Notes |
|---|---|---|---|
| 2010 | Videofashion | Herself | Joan Smalls - Model Profile - Videofashion |
| 2011–2016 | Victoria's Secret Fashion Show | Herself | Annual Victoria's Secret Fashion Show |
| 2012 | The Style Awards | Herself | The Style Network 9th Annual Style Awards |
| 2015 | Victoria's Secret Swim Special | Herself | Victoria's Secret Swim Special in Puerto Rico |
| 2017 | RuPaul's Drag Race | Herself | Episode: "Gayest Ball Ever" |
| 2018 | Lip Sync Battle | Herself | Episode: "S4.E7 Luis Fonsi vs Joan Smalls" |
| 2018 | Movie Night with Karlie Kloss | Herself | Episode: "S1.E6 Hitch" |

=== Music videos ===
| Year | Title | Artist | Director(s) |
|---|---|---|---|
| 2006 | "It's Alright" | Ricky Martin | Simón Brand |
| 2013 | "Phoenix" | ASAP Rocky | Francesco Carrozzini |
| 2014 | "Yoncé" | Beyoncé | Ricky Saiz |
| 2016 | "Wolves" | Kanye West | Steven Klein |
| 2016 | "Fuego" | Juanes | Kacho López |
| 2017 | "Hermosa Ingrata" | Juanes | Kacho López |
| 2018 | "Està Rico" | Marc Anthony, Will Smith, Bad Bunny | Carlos Perez |
| 2022 | "All Mine" | Brent Faiyaz | Lonewolf and Mark Peaced |
