= Overdoz =

US rap group

OverDoz.
- Origin: Los Angeles, California, United States
- Genres: Hip hop
- Years active: 2008−present
- Labels: Polo Grounds; RCA
- Members: Kent Jamz; Joon; P; Cream

Overdoz (stylized as OverDoz.) is an American hip hop group based in Los Angeles, California. The group is composed of vocalist and rapper Kent Jamz, rapper Joon, rapper P and comedian Cream. The group formed in the summer of 2008 and are currently signed to RCA Records and Polo Grounds Music. Overdoz has collaborated with several prominent artists in the hip hop industry, such as Kendrick Lamar, Pharrell Williams, A$AP Rocky, A$AP Ferg, Childish Gambino, Juicy J, The Internet, Flatbush Zombies, Dom Kennedy, Casey Veggies, Nipsey Hussle and Skeme.

== Musical career ==
Overdoz. released their first mixtape Bowties and Rosaries in 2008, followed by Nova in 2010, Live For, Die For in 2011, and Boom in 2013. The group independently released their single "Lauren London” " in 2012, which currently has over 1,000,000 plays on YouTube, followed by "Killer Tofu" in 2013. In 2015, Overdoz. dropped three singles "Rich White Friends", "F**k Yo DJ" featuring A$AP Ferg, and "Last Kiss", which was produced by and featured Pharrell Williams on guest vocals. The group released their debut studio album 2008 in 2017. On October 13, 2017, the group released the song "District" along with the accompanying music video directed by long time collaborator Calmatic.

== Discography ==
=== Studio albums ===
List of studio albums, with selected details
Title	Album details
2008	Released: October 27, 2017; Label: Polo Grounds, RCA; Format: Digital download

=== Mixtapes ===
List of mixtapes, with selected details
Title	Album details
Bowties and Rosaries	Released: September 28, 2008; Label: Self-released; Format: Digital download
Nova	Released: January 1, 2010; Label: Self-released; Format: Digital download
Live For, Die For	Released: February 25, 2011; Label: Self-released; Format: Digital download
Boom	Released: November 14, 2013; Label: Self-released; Format: Digital download

=== Singles ===
==== As lead artist ====
List of singles as lead artist, with showing year released and album name
Title	Year	Album
"Lauren London"	2012	non-album single
"Destabil"	2012	non-album single
"Killer Tofu"	2013	non-album single
"Rich White Friends"	2015	2008
"Fuck Yo DJ" (featuring A$AP Ferg)	2015	2008
"Last Kiss" (featuring Pharrell Williams)	2015	2008
