= Polo Grounds Music =

American hip hop and R&B record label

- Parent company: Sony Music Entertainment
- Founded: August 17, 2006; 20 years ago
- Founder: Bryan Leach
- Distributor: RCA Records
- Genre: Hip-hop; R&B
- Country of origin: U.S.
- Location: New York City, New York
- Official website: www.pologroundsmusic.com

Polo Grounds Music is a hip-hop and R&B record label, distributed by Sony Music Entertainment's RCA Records. It was founded on August 17, 2006 by Bryan Leach.

== History ==
=== Foundation ===
In 2006, Bryan Leach, a longtime native of Harlem, New York City, had formed a limited liability company called Polo Grounds Music, named after Polo Grounds Towers (the apartment complex where Leach grew up, which was built on the former site of the Polo Grounds stadium).

=== Partnership with J and success ===
After securing a joint venture partnership with Clive Davis' J Records, the label's first signee was Baton Rouge rapper Hurricane Chris, who in 2007, would earn the label its first Platinum hit single with "A Bay Bay". It was followed up by the release of Chris' debut, 51/50 Ratchet, that November. Leach was also given an offer to become senior vice president of RCA Records, but he declined, preferring to be in charge of his own label.

In 2009, Polo Grounds signed Pitbull, following the bankruptcy and closure of his previous label, TVT Records; founder Bryan Leach had previously had involvement with TVT as he was the vice president of A&R since 1998 until 2005. Upon signing, he was granted his own imprint, Mr. 305, Inc. That August, Pitbull released Pitbull Starring in Rebelution, which garnered its multi-platinum hit single, "Hotel Room Service", helping the album top the Billboard rap album chart. The song's success followed up two years later with the release of Planet Pit, and its singles, "Hey Baby (Drop It to the Floor)" and "Give Me Everything".

=== RCA Records merger and continued path ===
On October 7, 2011, J Records' parent company, Sony Music, completed the progress of merging its labels belonging to the RCA Music Group. J was included. With the merger and apparent absorption of J, Arista and Jive Records, Polo Grounds Music and the entirety of its roster (along with other labels and artists that were associated with J, Arista or Jive) were now deferred to release new music for RCA Records.

Following the merger of J into RCA and Polo Grounds being moved to the new brand, the label continued its streak, beginning in January 2012 with the release of Yo Gotti's album, Live from the Kitchen. Unfortunately, the album underperformed after selling 16,000 copies in its first week. After the album's subpar performance, Yo Gotti was dropped from Polo Grounds.

=== ASAP Rocky takeover ===
After previously releasing the music video for "Purple Swag", Polo Grounds founder Leach was among other label executives cornering ASAP Rocky with contractual offers, resulting in the two launching a close friendship. That October, Rocky decided to join the Polo Grounds imprint while it was distributed under J Records, a few days before the label was folded into RCA. The deal wasn't made public until October 14. The label acquired majority rights to distribute and reissue Rocky's "Purple Swag" single, which they did on October 24 through all digital platforms and radio networks. The single's re-release would be followed by the release of Rocky's mixtape, Live. Love. ASAP, on Halloween. The mixtape had since been reissued for streaming services by Polo Grounds ten years later for its anniversary with slight alterations.

ASAP Rocky's signage with Polo Grounds/RCA and his growing success also granted him and ASAP Mob co-founder ASAP Yams (1988–2015) their own label, ASAP Worldwide, when they agreed to sign affiliate ASAP Ferg to both labels.

Throughout 2013, Polo Grounds released two albums by both Rocky and Ferg, respectively Long. Live. ASAP and Trap Lord. The former debuted at number one on the Billboard 200, giving Rocky and Polo Grounds both their first mutual number one album in the label's catalogue and the rapper's discography. Meanwhile, the latter debuted at number nine with first week copies of 32,000 sold. However, Trap Lord managed to gain positive critical feedback.

In January 2015, Rocky's manager and partner, ASAP Yams died from an acute mixed drug intoxication, succumbing a sleep apnea. The news of his death impacted Rocky and Polo Grounds greatly and affected development for his sophomore album, which was due for release that February, but then delayed after the tragedy. The now-titled At. Long. Last. ASAP was finally released on May 26, once again debuting at number one on the Billboard 200, but sold poorly with 146,000 album-equivalent units. With 2016 beginning, Rocky's colleague, ASAP Ferg, began the label's year rollout with his own sophomore solo album, Always Strive and Prosper, which released on Earth Day. Later in October, the ASAP Mob released Cozy Tapes Vol. 1: Friends and followed up in between 2017 and 2019 with Vol. 2: Too Cozy, Ferg's mixtape, Still Striving, ASAP Twelvyy's solo debut, 12 (all within the summer of 2017), Rocky's third solo album, Testing (May 2018), and Ferg's extended play, Floor Seats (August 2019), all of each released under ASAP Worldwide/Polo Grounds/RCA; Rocky's Testing would end up being his final album to be released by Polo Grounds as he left the label in early 2019.

=== Failed comeback attempts and RCA deal extensions ===
In 2012, the label signed newcomers Lantana, Yung Joc and Overdoz. Lantana released the single, "All Hustle, No Luck". However, the single's commercial release was piqued by founder Bryan Leach's first degree gun conviction. Overdoz debuted with the single, "Lauren London", which was met with mostly positive critical reviews.

In 2014, Polo Grounds renewed a multi-year label deal with RCA.

Pitbull attempted a comeback with the single, "Timber" (2013), which ultimately made the number one position on the Billboard Hot 100 in early 2014. Unfortunately, three of Pitbull's follow-up albums have poor commercial responses; Global Warming (2012) sold 64,000 copies in its first week, while Globalization (2014) only accumulated 49,000 and Climate Change (2017) sold 14,000. This lack of commercial performance caused Pitbull to part ways with Polo Grounds Music after Climate Change's release.

In December 2018, Polo Grounds and RCA signed another partnership extension, making the former a temporary subsidiary of RCA Records. With this second renewal came the departure of ASAP Rocky after three albums under the label and him being replaced by Chicago sensation Calboy.

=== Recovery ===
Calboy had released the single, "Envy Me", previously in September 2018. After Polo Grounds signed the Chicago rapper to the label, they (like ASAP Rocky's "Purple Swag") acquired the single and pushed it to streaming services. The single's popularity began to take off and managed to retrieve a gold certification from the RIAA, recovering the label's prosperity. On May 9, 2019, Calboy was succeeded by the release of another label mate, Brooklyn rapper Jay Gwuapo's debut album, From Nothing, Pt. 1. Calboy retrieved with his first EP release, Wildboy, three weeks later. He later followed with two more EPs, 2020's Long Live the Kings and 2022's Black Heart.

As recent as February 2022, Calboy publicly disclosed his frustrations with Polo Grounds and RCA Records, believing he was being treated like a "label slave".

== Notable artists ==
=== Current ===
- Abra
- ASAP Ferg
- ASAP Rocky
- Overdoz

=== Former ===
- ASAP Mob
  - ASAP Twelvyy
- Hurricane Chris
- Nina Sky
- Pitbull
- Sammie
- Yo Gotti
- Yung Joc
- Calboy

== Discography ==
- Hurricane Chris - 51/50 Ratchet (2007)
- Pitbull - Rebelution (2009)
- Hurricane Chris - Unleashed (2009)
- Yo Gotti - Live from the Kitchen (2012)
- ASAP Rocky - Long. Live. ASAP (2013)
- ASAP Ferg - Trap Lord (2013)
- ASAP Rocky - At. Long. Last. ASAP (2015)
- ASAP Ferg- Always Strive and Prosper (2016)
- ASAP Ferg- Still Striving (2017)
- ASAP Twelvyy - 12 (2017)
- ASAP Ferg- Floor Seats (2019)
- Calboy - Wildboy EP (2019)
