= Yamborghini High =

Single by ASAP Mob featuring Juicy J

Single by ASAP Mob featuring Juicy J

from the album Cozy Tapes Vol. 1: Friends
- Released: January 16, 2016
- Recorded: 2015
- Genre: Hip-hop
- Length: 5:06 (Single Version); 7:20 (Album Version); 5:12 (Music Video Version)
- Label: ASAP Worldwide; Polo Grounds; RCA
- Songwriter(s): Rakim Mayers; Darold Brown; Tariq Devega; Jamel Phillips; Adam Kirkman; Jordan Houston; Patrick Houston; Hector Delgado
- Producer(s): Delgado

A$AP Mob singles chronology
"Hella Hoes" (2014)	"Yamborghini High" (2016)	"Crazy Brazy" (2016)

Juicy J singles chronology
"Drive You Crazy" (2015)	"Yamborghini High" (2016)	"All Night" (2016)

"Yamborghini High" is a song by American hip hop collective ASAP Mob featuring American rapper Juicy J. It was released on January 16, 2016, as the first single from their debut album Cozy Tapes Vol. 1: Friends. The song was first previewed live in concert during Hong Kong's Clockenflap Festival on November 28, 2015. The song officially premiered on Drake's Beats 1 show OVO Sound Radio on January 16, 2016. The song contains an interpolation of "North Memphis", as performed by Project Pat.

== Background ==
"Yamborghini High" pays respect to ASAP Yams, a founding member of the ASAP Mob, who died on January 18, 2015.

== Music video ==
The music video for "Yamborghini High" stars ASAP Rocky, ASAP Nast, ASAP Ant, ASAP Ferg, and Three Six Mafia rap duo member Juicy J, with appearances from Tatianna Paulino (ASAP Yams' mother), as well as various models.

Showcased in the video are a fleet of Lamborghinis, a mansion & monoliths all in shifted hues & datamoshed transitions combined to complete a vivid vision of a surreal world. The artists & models wear several fashion brands throughout the video, including ASAP Bari's own streetwear label VLONE, as well as Adidas, Vans & Vetements.

The video was directed by Shomi Patwary. The compositor, colorist & main visual effects artist was Robert "Robbie" Simmons, with credits to graphics artist Unkle Luc for datamoshing, transitions & general visual effects.

Some of the software tools used in the video's creation include Adobe After Effects, Mocha Pro and Boujou.

The music video was uploaded to YouTube to the ASAP Mob Vevo channel on 11 May 2016 and has over 170 million views to date.

== Charts ==
Chart (2016)	Peak position
US Bubbling Under R&B/Hip-Hop Singles (Billboard)	7

== Certifications ==
Region	Certification	Certified units/sales
Canada (Music Canada)	Platinum	80,000^{‡}
New Zealand (RMNZ)	Gold	15,000^{‡}
Poland (ZPAV)	Gold	25,000^{‡}
United States (RIAA)	Platinum	1,000,000^{‡}
^{‡} Sales+streaming figures based on certification alone.
