= Purple Swag =

2011 single by ASAP Rocky

Single by ASAP Rocky

from the album Live. Love. ASAP
- Released: December 5, 2011
- Genre: Cloud rap
- Length: 1:58
- Label: Polo Grounds; RCA
- Songwriters: Rakim Mayers; Tyshaun Holloway
- Producer: ASAP Ty Beats

ASAP Rocky singles chronology
"Peso" (2011)	"Purple Swag" (2011)	"Hands on the Wheel" (2012)

Music video
- "Purple Swag" on YouTube

"Purple Swag" is a song by American rapper ASAP Rocky. It premiered as a music video on July 5, 2011, before being released as the second single from his debut mixtape Live. Love. ASAP (2011) on December 5, 2011. Produced by ASAP Ty Beats of ASAP Mob, the song samples "Still Tippin'" by Mike Jones (featuring Slim Thug and Paul Wall), "Stay with Me" by Clint Mansell (featuring Kronos Quartet and Mogwai) and the video game Mortal Kombat 3.

The song became one of ASAP Rocky's breakout hits, alongside his song "Peso". It attracted the attention of numerous record labels within a week of its video's release, including Polo Grounds Music, which he eventually signed to. It was also certified Gold by the Recording Industry Association of America (RIAA) for equivalent sales of 500,000 units in the United States.

== Background ==
According to ASAP Rocky, he recorded the song in a small closet while high on lean and marijuana. He described seeing his surroundings as appearing purple during the process.

== Composition and lyrics ==
The song is influenced by Houston hip-hop and finds ASAP Rocky expressing his love for its culture, including purple drank and candy paint. It contains a heavy bass and slowed down vocals. Steve "Flash" Juon of RapReviews described it as a "New Yorker's version of DJ Screw music".

== Music video ==
The music video debuted in July 2011. It features ASAP Rocky and a woman named Anna Trill, both wearing gold grills and lip-syncing the song. Rocky is seen smoking blunts, in the company of fellow ASAP Mob members and riding on the handlebars of a BMX.

The video received some criticism for Trill mouthing "nigga" despite being white. Rocky defended her in an interview with HipHopDX, saying "She's cool. She's fun. That's really the person she is. She does use the [word 'nigga'] all the time – you know, she's cool like that. She smokes. She drinks. She's cool... she's sexy. She's cute."

== Remixes ==
An official remix of the song titled "Purple Swag: Chapter 2" appears on Live. Love. ASAP. It features American rappers SpaceGhostPurrp and ASAP Nast. A second remix, featuring Houston rappers Paul Wall, Bun B and Killa Kyleon, appears as a bonus track on ASAP Rocky's debut studio album Long. Live. ASAP (2013).

Georgia-born rapper Nine Vicious, sampled the track on his own "Purple Swag" from his album Emotions.

== Certifications ==
Region	Certification	Certified units/sales
United States (RIAA)	Gold	500,000^{‡}
^{‡} Sales+streaming figures based on certification alone.
