= E-Smitty =

American musician (born 1981)

E. Smitty
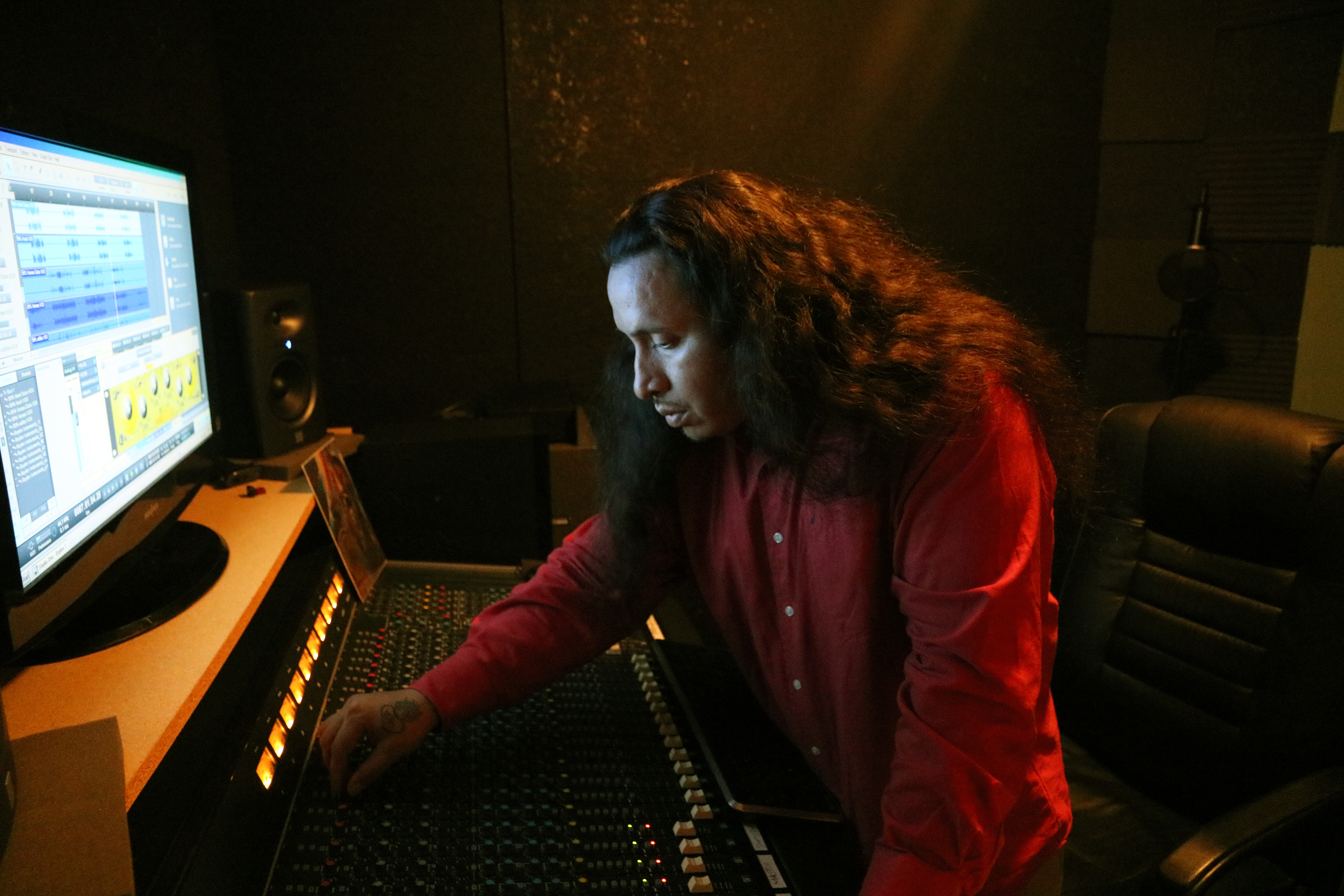
- E. Smitty Producing

Background information
- Also known as: E. Smitty, E-Smitty
- Born: Eric Finnerud; September 11, 1981 (age 45)
- Origin: Atlanta, U.S.
- Genres: Hip hop; Rap; R&B; hardcore hip hop; gangsta rap
- Occupations: Producer Engineer; songwriter
- Years active: 1996–present
- Labels: INgrooves; The Orchard (company); Sound Alive Records

Eric Finnerud (born September 11, 1981), professionally known as E. Smitty, (also stylized as E-Smitty), is an American record producer, audio engineer and songwriter. He has produced and engineered tracks for artists such as ASAP Ferg, Sadat X, Group Home, Lil Dap, Future, and Murdah Baby and collaborated with various artists including, Kool G Rap, Alpha Memphis, Rebel Rodomez, SpiderDaGod, Chino XL, Pacewon, Chris Rivers and many others.

== Career ==
E. Smitty began his career producing a large number of albums for independent artists. In 2005–2006, E. Smitty produced albums for "Em-Lo" - Existence is Mandatory, Love is Optional, "Paul Bunyun & Derez" - Destined to Be, and "Nottie Dread" - Nottie Dread, and in 2009 for "Lil Twan" - Hate On This among others. In 2010, E. Smitty signed a distribution deal with multi platinum producer "Keith Clizark" releasing two albums: Knowledge Is Power and New Age Of HipHop, featuring Agallah, Kool G Rap, Armageddon (Formerly Of Terror Squad) and Raydar Ellis. In 2012, E. Smitty produced arguably the favorite record on ASAP Mob's Lords Never Worry Mixtape "Choppas On Deck" by ASAP Ferg. In 2015, E. Smitty released his 1st Instrumental series A Beat Tape Vol. 1 and shortly thereafter signed a distribution deal with The Orchard for his record label Sound Alive Records. In 2017, following recent success, E. Smitty released Best Of E. Smitty featuring Kool G Rap, Chino XL, Pacewon, Lil Dap, Raydar Ellis, SpiderDaGod, Rebel Rodomez, K.I.R.K. and Sadat X.

== Music style ==
E. Smitty's music has been described as a blend of soulful, melodic rhythm and slapping drums.

== Audio engineer ==
E. Smitty is also a Mixing and Mastering Engineer and founder of Sound Alive Studios. E. Smitty's experience has allowed him to producer and engineer music for gold, platinum and independent artists & musicians.

== Discography ==
Albums (Incomplete List)

- G-Vegas Mixtapes Vol 1,2,3 (2002) (Producer/Engineer)
- Paul Bunyun & Derez - Destined To Be (2005) (Producer/Engineer)
- Em Lo - Existence Is Mandatory, Love Is Optional (2006) (Producer/Engineer)
- Nottie Dread - Nottie Dread (2006) (Producer/Engineer)
- Lil Twan - Hate On This (2009) (Producer/Engineer)
- E. Smitty - Knowledge Is Power (2010) (Producer/Engineer)
- E. Smitty - New Age Of HipHop (2010) (Producer/Engineer)
- Concore Entertainment The Takeover (2012) (Mastering Engineer)
- E. Smitty - A Beat Tape (2015) (Producer/Engineer)
- E. Smitty & Amenta Asylum - The EP (2016) (Producer/Engineer)
- Group Home - Forever (2017) (Producer/Engineer)
- Manny Major - Crossroads (2017) (Mastering Engineer)
- Best Of E. Smitty (2017) (Producer/Engineer)
- Travaughn - Welcome To Infinity (2017) (Producer/Engineer)

Singles (Incomplete List)

- Raydar Ellis - Inspiration (2007) (Producer/Engineer)
- Lil Twan & Agallah - She Like The Way (2007) (Producer/Engineer)
- E. Smitty Feat. Lil Twan & Nottie Dread - Shorty (2008) (Producer/Engineer)
- E. Smitty Feat. Manovwar & Loot-Tenant - New Age Of Hip Hop (2008) (Producer/Engineer)
- E. Smitty Feat. Agallah - Dreamed (2010) (Producer/Engineer)
- E. Smitty Feat. Kool G Rap & Original Sin - Serious (2010) (Producer/Engineer)
- Asap Ferg - Choppas On Deck (2012) (Producer)
- Sadat X - Fire (2012) (Mix Engineer)
- Sadat X - Ghetto Bird (2012) (Mix Engineer)
- Murdah Baby Feat. Future - Hit Licks (2012) (Mastering Engineer)
- Murdah Baby Feat. Whitewash & Gucci Mane - Hurtn Feeling'z (2012) (Mastering Engineer)
- Lil Dap - Pray For Me (2013) (Producer/Engineer)
- Lil Dap - Things Ain't The Same (2013) (Producer/Engineer)
- Struggle The Blind Chemist - The Essence (2014) (Producer/Engineer)
- Flow Patrol - Backstreet Diamonds (2014) (Producer/Engineer)
- Flow Patrol - High Life Mafia (2014) (Producer/Engineer)
- Flow Patrol Feat. Sadat X - Watch Me (2014) (Producer/Engineer)
- Struggle The Blind Chemist - Warz On The Frontline (2014) (Producer/Engineer)
- BeN iLLa Feat. Sadat X - Third Eye All Knowing (2015) (Producer/Engineer)
- Struggle The Blind Chemist - Rugged Times (2015) (Producer/Engineer)
- Knowledgeable Intellect Feat. Chris Rivers & Sadat X - Block Boyz (2015) (Producer/Engineer)
- Eighty8 - Check It Out (2015) (Producer/Engineer)
- Jacob Bissell Feat. Sadat X - Diamond (2015) (Producer/Engineer)
- Class_Sick - My Time (2015) (Producer/Engineer)
- Mister Reis - Go Crazy (2015) (Producer/Engineer)
- Tafari XL - Paper Chasin' (2015) (Producer/Engineer)
- Struggle The Blind Chemist - The Message (2016) (Producer/Engineer)
- Splash Townsend - Indigo World (2016) (Producer/Engineer)
- Nspire - Trying To Get High (2016) (Producer/Engineer)
- Villain - Don't Front (2016) (Producer/Engineer)
- Villain - Mike Vick (2016) (Producer/Engineer)
- Chino XL - I Can't Breathe (2016) (Producer/Engineer)
- E. Smitty Feat. Sadat X & BeN iLLa - When The Smoke Clears (2016) (Producer/Engineer)
- E. Smitty Feat. Armageddon & King Phaze - Ain't Ready (2016) (Producer/Engineer)
- Old Soul - Delynchify Your Mindz (2016) (Producer/Engineer)
- Villain - So High (2016) (Producer/Engineer)
- Chino XL & Observer A - Smooth Ass Women (2016) (Producer/Engineer)
- Observer A - Move Rhymes (2016) (Producer/Engineer)
- The White Lion - Decompression (2016) (Producer/Engineer)
- Group Home - PA To NY (2017) (Producer/Engineer)
- Group Home - Brownsville (2017) (Producer/Engineer)
- E. Smitty Feat. Sadat X & Villain - Bubble World (2017) (Producer/Engineer)
- SpiderDaGod Feat. Chino XL & Pacewon - New (2017) (Producer/Engineer)
- SpiderDaGod Feat. Mickey Factz - Public Defender (2017) (Producer/Engineer)
- K.I.R.K. - Arranged (2017) (Producer/Engineer)
- Manny Major - These Days (2017) (Producer/Engineer)
- K.I.R.K. - Reminiscin (2017) (Producer/Engineer)
- Kool G Rap, Rebel Rodomez & Alpha Memphis - My Life (2017) (Producer/Engineer)
- Chuck N Lock - Hard To Come By (2017) (Producer/Engineer)
- K.I.R.K. - Take A Shot (2017) (Producer/Engineer)
- The White Lion - Take A Stand (2017) (Producer/Engineer)
- K.I.R.K. - Elevate (2017) (Producer/Engineer)
