= Lords Never Worry =

Mixtape by ASAP Mob
- Released: August 28, 2012
- Recorded: 2011–2012
- Genres: Hip hop; trap; cloud rap
- Length: 61:52
- Labels: ASAP; Polo Grounds; RCA
- Producers: Pretty Flacko (exec.); Yamborghini (exec.); 183rd; AraabMuzik; ASAP P on the Boards; ASAP Ty Beats; Benson Graves; Chinza // Fly; Clams Casino; Carnage; Electro Beats; E-Smitty; Milo; PAFMilo; Silky Johnson; VERYRVRE

ASAP Mob chronology
| Lords Never Worry (2012) | Cozy Tapes Vol. 1: Friends (2016) |

Singles from Lords Never Worry
- 1. "Bath Salt" Released: July 27, 2012; 2. "Purple Kisses" Released: August 13, 2012; 3. "Work" Released: August 20, 2012

Lords Never Worry (stylized as Lord$ Never Worry) is the debut mixtape by American hip hop collective ASAP Mob. It was released as a free digital download on August 28, 2012, by ASAP Worldwide, Polo Grounds Music, and RCA Records. The mixtape contains verses from ASAP Mob group members ASAP Rocky, ASAP Twelvyy, ASAP Ant, ASAP Ferg, and ASAP Nast, along with guest appearances from Danny Brown, Raekwon, Flatbush Zombies, Gunplay, Dash, Fat Trel, Jim Jones and Bodega Bamz. The album's production was provided by Clams Casino, ASAP Ty Beats, AraabMuzik and P On The Boards, among others.

The mixtape's music incorporates stylistic and production elements of various hip hop scenes, as was seen on Rocky's debut solo mixtape Live. Love. ASAP. Over the course of its 18 tracks, the mixtape incorporates Southern and "trap" hip hop beats containing rattling hi-hats and heavy bass.

== Background ==
In 2012, it was initially announced that the group's mixtape was scheduled for a May 2012 release, to be followed by Rocky's debut album Long. Live. ASAP during the summer. However, after failing to be released during these months, Rocky announced in mid-July that the album would be released two weeks later. Again, however, the mixtape was not to be released and it was eventually announced that it would be released on August 28, 2012, via LiveMixtapes. The first single from their mixtape, called "Bath Salt", contains verses from Rocky and ASAP Ant, with guest features from Flatbush, New York-based hip hop group Flatbush Zombies. It was released at midnight on July 27, 2012. On August 13, 2012, a music video was released for a track called "Purple Kisses", followed by a music video for ASAP Ferg's track called "Work", one week later on August 20, 2012.

== Reception ==
=== Critical response ===
Professional ratings
Review scores
| Source | Rating |
|---|---|
| Pitchfork | (4.9/10) |

Upon its release, Lords Never Worry received generally negative reviews. Pitchfork Media's Jordan Sargent found ASAP Rocky and ASAP Ferg to be the highlights of the group, although he criticized the execution of the beats on the mixtape.

== Track listing ==
| No. | Title | Writer(s) | Producer | Length |
|---|---|---|---|---|
| 1. | "Thuggin' Noise" (featuring ASAP Rocky) | Rakim Mayers | Silky Johnson | 3:18 |
| 2. | "Full Metal Jacket" (featuring ASAP Rocky, ASAP Twelvyy, Dash, ASAP Ant, ASAP Ferg, and ASAP Nast) | Mayers; Jamel Phillips; Darien Dash; Adam Kirkman; Darold Ferguson Jr.; Tariq Devega | 183rd | 2:33 |
| 3. | "Bangin' on Waxx" (featuring ASAP Ferg and ASAP Nast) | Ferguson Jr.; Devega; Tyshaun Holloway | ASAP Ty Beats | 3:44 |
| 4. | "Coke and White Bitches: Chapter 2" (featuring ASAP Ant, Danny Brown, Fat Trel, and Gunplay) | Kirkman; Daniel Sewell; Martrel Reeves; Richard Morales Jr. | ASAP P on the Boards | 5:12 |
| 5. | "Bath Salt" (featuring ASAP Rocky, ASAP Ant, and Flatbush Zombies) | Mayers; Kirkman; Dimitri Simms; Antonio Lewis; Erick Elliott | ASAP P on the Boards | 4:10 |
| 6. | "Persian Wine" (featuring ASAP Ferg) | Ferguson Jr. | VERYRVRE | 3:14 |
| 7. | "Black Mane" (featuring ASAP Nast) | Devega | Electro Beats | 3:26 |
| 8. | "Dope, Money, Hoes" (featuring Dash) | Dash; Abraham Orellana | AraabMuzik | 3:33 |
| 9. | "Work" (featuring ASAP Ferg) | Ferguson Jr. | Chinza // Fly | 2:59 |
| 10. | "Y.N.R.E." (featuring ASAP Twelvyy) | Phillips; Orellana | AraabMuzik | 2:33 |
| 11. | "Purple Kisses" (featuring ASAP Rocky) | Mayers | VERYRVRE | 3:20 |
| 12. | "The Way It Go" (featuring ASAP Ant) | Kirkman | PAFMilo | 2:44 |
| 13. | "Freeze" (featuring ASAP Rocky and Jim Jones) | Mayers; Joseph Jones II; Michael Volpe | Clams Casino | 3:32 |
| 14. | "Told Ya" (featuring ASAP Ant and Bodega Bamz) | Kirkman; Nathaniel De la Rosa; Diamante Blackmon | Carnage | 2:24 |
| 15. | "Underground Killa$" (featuring ASAP Rocky, ASAP Ferg, and Raekwon) | Mayers; Ferguson Jr.; Corey Woods | Benson Graves | 3:56 |
| 16. | "Jay Reed" (featuring ASAP Twelvyy and Dash) | Phillips; Dash | ASAP P on the Boards | 3:22 |
| 17. | "Gotham City" (featuring ASAP Ferg, ASAP Twelvyy, and ASAP Nast) | Ferguson Jr.; Phillips; Devega; Holloway | ASAP Ty Beats | 4:29 |
| 18. | "Choppas on Deck" (featuring ASAP Ferg) | Ferguson Jr. | E-Smitty | 3:28 |
| Total length: | | | | 61:52 |

== Personnel ==
- AraabMuzik - Producer
- ASAP Ant - Performer
- ASAP Ferg - Performer
- ASAP Nast - Performer
- ASAP Rocky - Executive producer (credited as Pretty Flacko), performer
- ASAP Twelvyy - Performer
- ASAP Ty Beats - Producer
- ASAP Yams - Executive producer (credited as Yamborghini)
- Benson Graves - Producer
- Bodega Bamz - Performer
- Carnage - Producer
- Chinza // Fly - Producer
- Clams Casino - Producer
- Danny Brown - Performer
- Dash - Performer
- Electro Beats - Producer
- E-Smitty - Producer
- Fat Trel - Performer
- Flatbush Zombies - Performer
- Gunplay - Performer
- Jim Jones - Performer
- Matthew Williams - Art direction, photography
- PAFMilo - Producer
- 183rd - Producer
- P On The Boards - Producer
- Raekwon - Performer
- Ricky Saiz - Art direction, photography
- Silky Johnson - Producer
- Veryrvre - Producer
