= Cozy Tapes Vol. 2: Too Cozy =

Studio album by ASAP Mob
- Released: August 25, 2017
- Recorded: 2016–2017
- Genres: Hip hop; trap
- Length: 51:38
- Labels: ASAP; Polo Grounds; RCA
- Producers: 5 Star Rico; Djo Watt; Dun Deal; Franchise; Frank Dukes; Hector Delgado; Hit-Boy; Medi BPM; Michael Uzowuru; Pi'erre Bourne; Pyroman; RZA; SdotFire; Slade Da Monsta; Sly C; Southside; Vegyn; Zoneout Worldwide

ASAP Mob chronology
Cozy Tapes Vol. 1: Friends (2016)	Cozy Tapes Vol. 2: Too Cozy (2017)

Singles from Cozy Tapes Vol. 2: Too Cozy
- 1. "Raf" Released: May 15, 2017; 2. "Feels So Good" Released: August 16, 2017

Cozy Tapes Vol. 2: Too Cozy is the second studio album by American hip hop collective ASAP Mob. It was released on August 25, 2017, by ASAP Worldwide, Polo Grounds Music and RCA Records. The album features guest appearances from Big Sean, Pro Era, Quavo, Lil Uzi Vert, Lil Yachty, Chief Keef, Gucci Mane, Schoolboy Q, Frank Ocean, Jaden Smith, Smooky Margielaa and Flatbush Zombies. It was preceded by two singles, "Raf" featuring ASAP Rocky, Playboi Carti, Quavo, Lil Uzi Vert and Frank Ocean, and "Feels So Good" featuring ASAP Rocky, ASAP Ferg, ASAP Nast, ASAP Twelvyy and ASAP Ant.

== Background ==
On July 4, 2017, ASAP Mob confirmed the second installment of their Cozy Tapes series. Its released was preceded by solo releases from two other ASAP Mob members in August, with ASAP Twelvyy's 12 album on August 4 and ASAP Ferg's Still Striving album on August 18.

The track listing surfaced online on August 22, a few days before release.

== Promotion ==
The album's promotional single, "Wrong" featuring ASAP Rocky and ASAP Ferg, was released on April 28, 2017, it was produced by Harry Fraud, which did not make the final track listing.

The music video for the song, titled "RAF", was released on July 24, 2017, directed by ASAP Rocky and Austin Winchell.

On July 25, 2017, ASAP Mob announced the Too Cozy Tour to accompany the album across the United States from September to November 2017.

=== Singles ===
The lead single, "RAF" featuring ASAP Rocky, Playboi Carti, Quavo, Lil Uzi Vert and Frank Ocean, was released on May 15, 2017. The second single, "Feels So Good" featuring ASAP Rocky, ASAP Ferg, ASAP Nast, ASAP Twelvyy and ASAP Ant, was released on August 16, 2017.

== Critical reception ==
Professional ratings
Aggregate scores
Source	Rating
Metacritic	70/100
Review scores
Source	Rating
AllMusic	4/5 stars
Consequence of Sound	B
Exclaim!	4/10
HipHopDX	3.5/5
Pitchfork	6/10

Cozy Tapes Vol. 2: Too Cozy received generally positive reviews from critics. At Metacritic, which assigns a normalized rating out of 100 to reviews from mainstream publications, the album received an average score of 70, based on five reviews. M.T. Richards of Exclaim! criticised the album for a lack of originality and cohesion: "Rocky and his acolytes convene for a rundown of trends worth exploiting; as such, it often sounds like a Migos album as interpreted by 16 clueless New Yorkers. The lack of thump and energy is fatal, throwing cold water on any chance Rocky may have had at profiting off of Migos' grassroots momentum. At its best ("Frat Rules"), CTV2 is perfunctory; at its worst ("Get a Bag"), it denotes a scornful disinterest in what makes club-goers tick." Greg Whitt of Consequence of Sound commented that Cozy Tapes Vol. 2 has "a loose family vibe. One gets the sense that almost anyone who dropped by the studio as they were recording had the chance to make the album. As such, the album’s not a show of force, it’s a party."

== Commercial performance ==
Cozy Tapes Vol. 2 debuted at number six on the US Billboard 200 with 41,000 album-equivalent units. The album also entered at number 54 on the UK Albums Chart, selling 1,000 album-equivalent units in its first week. It also entered at number 22 on the UK R&B Chart.

== Track listing ==
Credits were adapted from Tidal.

No.	Title	Writer(s)	Producer(s)	Length
1.	"Skool Bus (Skit)"		Hector Delgado	2:15
2.	"Perry Aye" (ASAP Rocky, ASAP Nast and Playboi Carti featuring Jaden Smith)	Rakim Mayers; Tariq Devega; Nicolas Zita; Jordan Herff; Jordan Carter	Pyroman; DJO Watt	2:26
3.	"Please Shut Up" (ASAP Rocky featuring Key! and Gucci Mane)	Mayers; Kelton Scott II; Radric Davis; Gerrell Nealy	Franchise	3:30
4.	"Blowin' Minds (Skateboard)" (ASAP Rocky, ASAP Nast, ASAP Ant and Playboi Carti featuring Chief Keef)	Mayers; Devega; Jordan Jenks; Adam Kirkman; Keith Cozart; Carter	Pi'erre Bourne	3:27
5.	"Black Card" (ASAP Rocky featuring Smooky Margielaa)	Mayers; Jared Evans; Anthony Corpuz; Toumani Diabate	5 Star Rico; Sdotfire	1:59
6.	"Walk on Water" (ASAP Twelvyy, ASAP Ant, ASAP Nast, ASAP Ferg and Playboi Carti)	Jamel Phillips; Kirkman; Devega; Darold Brown; Carter	Hector Delgado	3:56
7.	"BYF" (ASAP Rocky and ASAP Ant featuring Smooky Margielaa)	Mayers; Kirkman; Christian Robles; Diabate; Davis	Sly C; Delgado^{[a]}	2:54
8.	"Get the Bag" (ASAP Rocky, ASAP Ferg, ASAP Ant, ASAP Nast, ASAP TyY, and Playboi Carti featuring Smooky Margielaa)	Mayers; Brown; Devega; Carter; Kirkman; Tyrone Walker; Diabate; Johansis Garcia	Zoneout Worldwide	4:16
9.	"Bahamas" (ASAP Rocky, ASAP Ferg and ASAP Twelvyy featuring Lil Yachty, Key!, Schoolboy Q and Smooky Margielaa)	Mayers; Brown; Phillips; Marcus Slade; Nealy; Quincy Hanley; Diabate	Slade Da Monsta	3:15
10.	"Principal Daryl Choad (Skit)"			0:56
11.	"Frat Rules" (ASAP Rocky and Playboi Carti featuring Big Sean)	Mayers; Chauncey Hollis; Joshua Luellen; Carter; Sean Anderson; Leon Ware; Pam Sawyer	Hit-Boy; Southside	3:38
12.	"FYBR (First Year Being Rich)" (ASAP Twelvyy, ASAP Rocky, ASAP Ant, ASAP Ferg and Playboi Carti featuring Key!)	Phillips; Delgado; Mayers; Kirkman; Brown; Nealy; Carter; Göksel Baktagir	Hector Delgado	3:31
13.	"Feels So Good" (ASAP Rocky, ASAP Ferg, ASAP Nast, ASAP Twelvyy and ASAP Ant)	Mayers; Brown; Devega; Phillips; Kirkman; Hollis; Adam Feeney	Hit-Boy; Frank Dukes	3:25
14.	"Coziest" (ASAP Twelvyy featuring Zack)	Phillips; Martin Rodriguez; Zack Kharbouch	Medi BPM	2:46
15.	"What Happens" (ASAP Rocky, ASAP Ferg, ASAP Twelvyy and Playboi Carti featuring Joey Badass, Kirk Knight, Nyck Caution, Meechy Darko and Zombie Juice)	Brown; Devega; Carter; Kirkman; Walker; Robert Diggs; Jo-Vaughn Scott; Kirlan Labarrie; Jesse Cordasco; Dimitri Simms; Antonio Lewis	RZA	3:39
16.	"Raf" (ASAP Rocky and Playboi Carti featuring Quavo, Lil Uzi Vert and Frank Ocean)	Mayers; David Cunningham; Carter; Quavious Marshall; Symere Woods; Christopher Ocean	Dun Deal; Vegyn^{[c]}; Michael Uzowuru^{[c]}	4:15
17.	"Last Day of Skool (Skit)"			1:31
Total length:				51:38

Notes

- ^{^[a]} signifies a co-producer
- ^{^[b]} signifies an additional producer
- ^{^[c]} signifies an uncredited additional producer
- Contrary to the credits, "Blowin' Minds (Skateboard)" does not feature vocals by ASAP Ant.
- "Skool Bus (Skit)", "Principal Daryl Choad (Skit)" and "Last Day of Skool (Skit)" feature vocals by John C. Reilly, Lil Duvet and Yung Frosty.
- "Get the Bag" features additional vocals by ASAP Twelvyy.
- "What Happens" features additional vocals by ASAP Twelvyy and Playboi Carti.

Sample credits

- "BYF" contains a sample of "Swole Pocket Shawty", performed by Gucci Mane.

== Personnel ==
Credits adapted from Tidal.

Musicians

- Mike Carpenter – keyboards (track 7)

Technical

- Hector Delgado – recording (tracks 1, 2, 4–9, 11–15, 17), mixing (all tracks)
- Frans Mernick – recording (tracks 2, 8, 9)
- Lynas – recording (track 2)
- Desi Aguilar – mixing assistant (tracks 4, 5, 7, 13)
- Federico "C Sik" Lopez – recording (tracks 5, 7), mixing assistant (tracks 6, 9, 11–14)
- Dan Fyfe – mixing assistant (tracks 8, 15)
- Maximilian Jaeger – recording (track 11)
- Gregg Rominiecki – recording (track 11)

== Charts ==
=== Weekly charts ===
Chart (2017)	Peak position
Australian Albums (ARIA)	24
Belgian Albums (Ultratop Flanders)	40
Belgian Albums (Ultratop Wallonia)	126
Canadian Albums (Billboard)	14
Czech Albums (ČNS IFPI)	37
Dutch Albums (Album Top 100)	31
Finnish Albums (Suomen virallinen lista)	42
French Albums (SNEP)	74
German Albums (Offizielle Top 100)	77
New Zealand Albums (RMNZ)	17
Norwegian Albums (VG-lista)	26
Swiss Albums (Schweizer Hitparade)	54
UK Albums (Official Charts)	54
UK R&B Albums (Official Charts)	22
US Billboard 200	6
US Top R&B/Hip-Hop Albums (Billboard)	4

=== Year-end charts ===
Chart (2017)	Position
US Top R&B/Hip-Hop Albums (Billboard)	76

== Certifications ==
Region	Certification	Certified units/sales
United States (RIAA)	Gold	500,000^{‡}
^{‡} Sales+streaming figures based on certification alone.
