= Imagineer =

Imagineer or Imagineering may refer to:

- Walt Disney Imagineering, the arm of The Walt Disney Company responsible for the creation of theme parks
- Imagineer (Japanese company), a Japanese video game, mobile, software company
- Imagineer Systems, a visual effects software company
- Imagineering (company), former in-house studio of Absolute Entertainment.
