= Cozy Tapes Vol. 1: Friends =

Studio album by ASAP Mob
- Released: October 31, 2016
- Recorded: 2013–2016
- Genre: Hip hop; trap
- Length: 43:32
- Label: ASAP; Polo Grounds; RCA
- Producer: AyoDlo; Crazy Mike; Dun Deal; Delgato; DJ Smokey; Hector Delgado; Lil Awree; Maaly Raw; Nyrell Slade; Plu2o Nash; Wavy Wallace; Jigga BlvckVmish

ASAP Mob chronology
Lords Never Worry (2012)	Cozy Tapes Vol. 1: Friends (2016)	Cozy Tapes Vol. 2: Too Cozy (2017)

Singles from Cozy Tapes Vol. 1: Friends
- 1. "Yamborghini High" Released: January 16, 2016; 2. "Crazy Brazy" Released: October 14, 2016; 3. "Runner" Released: October 28, 2016; 4. "Telephone Calls" Released: October 28, 2016

Cozy Tapes Vol. 1: Friends is the debut studio album by American hip hop collective ASAP Mob. It was released on October 31, 2016, through ASAP Worldwide, Polo Grounds Music and RCA Records. The album contains verses from each member of the ASAP Mob group such as ASAP Rocky, ASAP Twelvyy, ASAP Ant, ASAP Ferg, ASAP Nast, Playboi Carti and Yung Lord/ASAP Bari. ASAP Mob enlisted the variety of guest appearances from Juicy J, Key!, Wiz Khalifa, BJ the Chicago Kid, Buddy, Skepta, Lil Uzi Vert, Lil Yachty, MadeinTYO, Onyx, Offset, Tyler, The Creator and Yung Gleesh; as well as the album's production was provided by Hector Delgado, alongside several other record producers such as AyoDlo, Crazy Mike, Dun Deal, Lil Awree, DJ Smokey, Plu2o Nash, Maaly Raw and Wavy Wallace.

Cozy Tapes Vol. 1: Friends was supported by four singles: "Yamborghini High" featuring Juicy J, "Crazy Brazy" featuring Key!, "Runner" featuring ASAP Ant and Lil Uzi Vert, and "Telephone Calls" featuring ASAP Rocky, Tyler, The Creator, Playboi Carti and Yung Gleesh. The project was released commercially to its streaming services with a physical CD, and the project also was released three weeks after the album's initial release.

== Album cover ==
The album cover is a photograph of ASAP Mob founder ASAP Yams as an infant, who later died on January 18, 2015, at the age of 26, due to an overdose to mixed drug intoxication.

== Singles ==
The album's lead single, "Yamborghini High" was released on January 16, 2016. The track features a guest appearance from American rapper Juicy J, with production by Hector Delgado. It is certified Platnum by the Recording Industry Association of America (RIAA). The second single, "Crazy Brazy" was released on October 14, 2016. The track features a guest appearance from American rapper Key!, with production by Wavy Wallace.

The album's third single, "Runner" was released on October 28, 2016. The track features a guest appearance from American rapper Lil Uzi Vert, with production by Maaly Raw. The fourth single, "Telephone Calls" featuring Tyler, The Creator, Playboi Carti and Yung Gleesh, was released on October 28, 2016. On October 16, 2020, the single was certified Gold by the RIAA.

== Critical reception ==
Professional ratings
Aggregate scores
Source	Rating
Metacritic	78/100
Review scores
Source	Rating
Exclaim	7/10
HipHopDX	4/5 stars
Pitchfork	7.1/10
XXL	4/5

Cozy Tapes Vol. 1: Friends received "generally positive" reviews from critics. At Metacritic, which assigns a normalized rating out of 100 to reviews from mainstream publications, the album received an average score of 78, based on 4 reviews. HipHopDX and XXL both gave the album four out of five, while Exclaim! and Pitchfork gave the album a 7/10 and a 7.1/10 respectively.

== Commercial performance ==
Cozy Tapes Vol. 1: Friends debuted at number 13 on the US Billboard 200 chart, earning 21,000 album-equivalent units in its first week. It peaked at number four on the US Top R&B/Hip-Hop Albums chart and the US Top Rap Albums chart.

== Track listing ==
Cozy Tapes Vol. 1: Friends
No.	Title	Lyrics	Music	Performers	Length
1.	"Yamborghini High" (featuring Juicy J)	Rakim Mayers; Darold Brown; Tariq Devega; Jamel Phillips; Adam Kirkman; Jordan Houston; Hector Delgado	Delgado	ASAP Rocky, ASAP Ferg, ASAP Nast, ASAP Twelvyy, and ASAP Ant	7:20
2.	"Crazy Brazy" (featuring Key!)	Mayers; Phillips; Cornel Wallace, Jr.; Marquis Whittaker	Wavy Wallace	ASAP Rocky and ASAP Twelvyy	3:08
3.	"Way High" (featuring Wiz Khalifa, BJ the Chicago Kid, and Buddy)	Mayers; Jeremiah Owens; Horgay Gordy; Allen Story; Anna Gaye; Cameron Thomaz; Bryan Sledge; Simmie Sims	Lil Awree	ASAP Rocky	2:56
4.	"Young Nigga Living"	Brown; Kirkman; Phillips; Lucas Kramar; Alain Goraguer	DJ Smokey	ASAP Ferg, ASAP Ant, and ASAP Twelvyy	4:18
5.	"Nasty's World" (featuring Onyx)	Devega; Brown; Delgado; Chylow Parker; Betty Newsome; James Brown; André Benjamin; Antwan Patton; Fredro Scruggs, Jr.; Kirk Jones; Tyrone Taylor; Jordan Carter	Delgado	ASAP Nast	3:58
6.	"Money Man"	Mayers; Devega; Houston; Jabari Shelton	Crazy Mike	ASAP Rocky, ASAP Nast, and ASAP Bari	3:32
7.	"Put That on My Set" (featuring Skepta)	Mayers; Owens; Willie Hutch; Joseph Adenuga	Lil Awree	ASAP Rocky	3:21
8.	"Motivation Foreign (Skit)"	Mayers; Brown; Devega; Phillips; Kirkman; Delgato; Nyrell Slade	Delgato; Slade^{[a]}		2:05
9.	"London Town"	Mayers; Kirkman; Delgado; Devon Lewis; Jordan Carter	AyoDlo; Delgado^{[a]}	ASAP Rocky, ASAP Ant, and Playboi Carti	2:42
10.	"Runner" (featuring Lil Uzi Vert)	Kirkman; Jamaal Henry; Symere Woods	Maaly Raw	ASAP Ant	3:20
11.	"Bachelor" (featuring Lil Yachty, MadeinTYO, and Offset)	Mayers; David Cunningham; Miles McCollum; Malcolm Davis; Kiari Cephus	Dun Deal	ASAP Rocky	2:56
12.	"Telephone Calls" (featuring Tyler, The Creator and Yung Gleesh)	Mayers; Carter; Delgado; Malcolm Lawson-Stribling; Asa Asuncion; Agostino Marangolo; Massimo Morante; Claudio Simonetti; Fabio Pignatelli; Tyler Okonma	Plu2o Nash; Delgado^{[a]}	ASAP Rocky and Playboi Carti	3:50
Total length:					43:32

Notes

- ^{^[a]} signifies an additional producer

== Charts ==
Chart (2016)	Peak position
Australian Albums (ARIA)	50
Canadian Albums (Billboard)	34
Dutch Albums (Album Top 100)	82
Finnish Albums (Suomen virallinen lista)	38
French Albums (SNEP)	153
New Zealand Albums (RMNZ)	30
Swiss Albums (Schweizer Hitparade)	61
UK Albums (Official Charts)	84
US Billboard 200	13
US Top R&B/Hip-Hop Albums (Billboard)	4
