= Telephone Calls =

2016 single by ASAP Mob

Single by ASAP Mob featuring ASAP Rocky, Tyler, the Creator, Playboi Carti, and Yung Gleesh

from the album Cozy Tapes Vol. 1: Friends
- Released: October 27, 2016
- Genre: Hip hop
- Length: 3:50
- Songwriters: Rakim Mayers; Jordan Carter; Hector Delgado; Malcolm Lawson-Stribling; Asa Asuncion; Agostino Marangolo; Massimo Morante; Claudio Simonetti; Fabio Pignatelli; Tyler Okonma
- Producers: Plu2o Nash; Hector Delgado (add.)

"Telephone Calls" is a song by American hip-hop collective ASAP Mob, featuring rappers ASAP Rocky, Tyler, the Creator, Playboi Carti, and Yung Gleesh. It was released on October 27, 2016, under the record label Polo Grounds, as the fourth single from ASAP Mob's debut studio album, Cozy Tapes Vol. 1: Friends. On October 16, 2020, the single was certified gold by the RIAA.

== Background ==
"Telephone Calls" was the first collaboration between ASAP Mob and Tyler, the Creator, as well as ASAP Mob's first collaboration with Playboi Carti, who had joined the group one month prior to its release.

According to ASAP Rocky, Tyler, the Creator was featured on the song after an incident where he walked into ASAP Rocky's house and saw him, Lil Yachty, Lil Uzi Vert, Yung Gleesh, and other people passed out on the floor. After he entered the house, he heard a preview of "Telephone Calls" and played it "over and over and over." ASAP Rocky and Tyler, the Creator went to a studio shortly after and recorded his verse on the song.

== Samples ==
According to the website WhoSampled, "Telephone Calls" contains two samples: the theme song from the Dario Argento cult horror "Suspiria" made by Italian prog rock band Goblin and "Legion of Doom" by Main Attrakoinz.
