= Hella Hoes =

Single by ASAP Mob

Single by ASAP Mob featuring ASAP Rocky, ASAP Ferg, ASAP Nast and ASAP Twelvyy
- Released: June 6, 2014
- Genre: East Coast hip hop
- Length: 3:31
- Label: ASAP Worldwide; Polo Grounds; RCA
- Songwriters: ASAP Ferg; ASAP Rocky; ASAP Nast; ASAP Twelvyy; Nyrell Slade
- Producer: Nyrell

ASAP Mob singles chronology
"Xscape" (2014)	"Hella Hoes" (2014)	"Yamborghini High" (2016)

ASAP Rocky singles chronology
"Fashion Killa" (2013)	"Hella Hoes" (2014)	"Pretend" (2014)

ASAP Ferg singles chronology
"Hood Pope" (2014)	"Hella Hoes" (2014)	"Lotta That" (2014)

ASAP Nast singles chronology
"Trillmatic" (2013)	"Hella Hoes" (2014)	"Ladies Hit Squad" (2016)

ASAP Twelvyy singles chronology
"Xscape" (2014)	"Hella Hoes" (2014)	"LORD" (2015)

Music video
- "Hella Hoes" on YouTube

"Hella Hoes" is a song by American rappers ASAP Rocky, ASAP Ferg, ASAP Nast and ASAP Twelvyy from the New York–based hip hop collective ASAP Mob. It was released as a single on June 6, 2014. The official remix features additional verses by fellow American rappers Danny Brown and Aston Mathews. Brown was supposed to be on the original version but was cut, causing him and the ASAP Mob to have a falling-out.

== Music video ==
A music video for the song released on July 10, 2014.

== Charts ==
Chart (2014)	Peak position
US Bubbling Under R&B/Hip-Hop Singles (Billboard)	10

== Certifications ==
Region	Certification	Certified units/sales
United States (RIAA)	Gold	500,000^{‡}
^{‡} Sales+streaming figures based on certification alone.
