= Shomi Patwary =

American music video director

- শমী পাটোয়ারী
- Born: Shomi Patwary; February 20, 1982 (age 44); Dhaka, Bangladesh
- Occupations: Designer, Artist, Director
- Years active: 2004–present

Shomi Patwary (born February 20, 1982, in Dhaka, Bangladesh) is a filmmaker, and co-founder of the creative collective Illusive Media. Shomi currently runs a production company with his wife Punom Patwary based out of New York City.

== Illusive Media ==
While a student at Old Dominion University Patwary co-created the multimedia artists collective, Illusive Media, with his lifelong friend and classmate Philip Ly. Initially the group began creating a web presence for underground artists, but later helped national acts like Sean Paul and N*E*R*D create an image that connected with a broader fan base. As websites like MySpace began to lose its grip in the internet and bloggers became the dominant source of information, Shomi and Illusive Media began directing Music Videos giving bloggers exclusive content to certain artists. Through Illusive Media, Shomi has directed music videos for several artists, most notably A$AP Mob & Clipse. Shomi Patwary with Illusive Media has directed videos for: Lupe Fiasco, Major Lazer, ASAP Rocky, Mark Ronson, Joey Badass as well as many others.

Shomi is known for his guerrilla style of directing and editing often shooting, editing and releasing a complete project on the fly over a few days time. This allowed Illusive Media to remain more of an artists collective rather than a for-profit business making just enough money to keep the lights on and thus attracting attention from top musicians and record industry executives across the globe. Through Illusive Media, Patwary is also widely respected for often taking into account a musician's image and artistic input and putting his own spin on the project creating a truly collaborative process. He is often credited alongside other Illusive Media artistic collaborators such as Phil Ly (co-director), Abe Vilchez-Moran (Director), Robert Elliot Simmons (Special Effects), Tashfiq Patwary (Producer), Charley Feher (Videographer Designer), Paolo Obcemane (Videographer/Photographer/Video Editor) and Jay McCord (Producer/Director/Actor). Shomi's younger brother, Tashfiq, is a member of the VERYRVRE production team which has produced tracks for the hip hop collective A$AP Mob and Santigold.

== Haiti earthquake ==
After the 2010 Haiti earthquake Shomi teamed up with Robert Simmons, Jay McCord, Kenna, Lupe Fiasco, and Mike Shinoda on the "Resurrection" music video to promote the "Music For Relief". The song was written and the music video was directed for free with all proceeds going to aid the Haiti disaster through Music for Relief.

== KarmaloopTV & the FADER ==
In April 2012, Shomi was brought on board as an in-house music video director and television producer by Karmaloop.com's TV division. Shomi has worked with KarmaloopTV to help build the television and music video brand and tie it in with the online retail giant's streetwear image. KarmaloopTV created a new division known as Karmaloop Media during the summer of 2012 Since taking the helm at Karmaloop, Patwary has shot videos for Beyoncé, ASAP Rocky, Diplo, Stalley, Wale, No Malice of the Clipse, and A-Trak. In 2014, Shomi left his appointment with Karmaloop to join the editorial team at the FADER magazine. With the FADER he will oversee all video production as Senior Video Producer.

== 2016 Much Music Award nominations ==
Shomi Patwary was nominated in several categories in 2016's Much Music Awards for Belly's video "Might Not" featuring The Weeknd.

Video of the Year

- Alessia Cara, "Here," Directed by Aaron A.
- Belly f. The Weeknd, "Might Not," Directed by Belly and Shomi Patwary
- Drake, "Hotline Bling," Directed by Director X
- Grimes, "Flesh Without Blood," Directed by Claire Boucher
- Shawn Mendes and Camila Cabello, "I Know What You Did Last Summer," Directed by Ryan Pallotta

Best Hip Hop Video

- Belly f. The Weeknd, "Might Not," Directed by Belly and Shomi Patwary
- Drake, "Hotline Bling," Directed by Director X
- Jazz Cartier, "The Valley/Dead or Alive," Directed by Kyle Sanderson
- John River, "Get Down," Directed by Abstrakte
- SonReal, "Whoa Nilly," Directed by Peter Huang

Best MuchFact Video

- Belly f. The Weeknd, "Might Not," Directed by Belly and Shomi Patwary
- Humans, "Water Water," Directed by Peter Ricq
- Majid Jordan f. Drake, "My Love," Directed by Common Good
- SonReal, "Whoa Nilly," Directed by Peter Huang
- Young Empires, "The Gates," Directed by Amos LeBlanc

== Videography ==
=== 2007 ===
- Skillz feat Freeway - "Don't Act Like You Don't Know"

=== 2009 ===
- Clipse - "Doorman"
- Clipse, Kanye West, KAWS - "Kinda Like A Big Deal" (Webisode)

=== 2010 ===
- Nottz - "Shine So Brite"
- Clipse - "Freedom"
- Kenna feat Lupe Fiasco, Mike Shinoda of Linkin Park - "Resurrection"
- Lupe Fiasco - "I'm Beamin"
- David Banner And 9th Wonder feat Heather Victoria - "Slow Down"
- Mansions on the Moon - "She Makes Me Feel"

=== 2011 ===
- Pusha T - "Cook It Down"
- Stalley - "Chevys and Spaceships"

=== 2012 ===
- Diplo feat Nicky Da B - "Express Yourself" (Director of Photography)
- Stalley feat Wale - "Home To You"
- A$AP Ferg - "Work"
- ASAP Rocky, ASAP Ant, Flatbush Zombies - "Bath Salt"

=== 2013 ===
- A-Trak feat Jim Jones, Juicy J, Flatbush Zombies, El-P - "Piss Test (Remix)"
- A$AP Ferg - Hood Pope
- Beyoncé - No Angel (Director of Photography)

=== 2014 ===
- A$AP Rocky - Multiply
- Major Lazer feat RDX - Lose Yourself (Director of Photography / Co-director)
- Major Lazer, Skrillex, Ezra Koenig (Vampire Weekend) - In Jamaica (Documentary)
- Mary J. Blige - Earlier That Day (The FADER Documentary)
- Vince Staples - Earlier That Day (The FADER Documentary)
- Trey Songz - Earlier That Day (The FADER Documentary)
- Jeremih - Jeremih Rides His Old Bus Route in Chicago (The FADER Documentary)
- Yung Lean - Goes Shopping In Brooklyn (The FADER Documentary)

=== 2015 ===
- A$AP Rocky - Jukebox
- Ty Dolla Sign feat. Charli XCX, Tinashe - Drop That Kitty
- Mark Ronson feat. Keyone Starr - I Can't Lose
- Keith Ape feat. Waka Flocka, Father, A$AP Ferg - IT G MA (Remix)
- Goldlink - Sober Thoughts
- Belly ft. The Weeknd - Might Not

=== 2016 ===
- Pusha T - ft. A$AP Rocky, The-Dream - M.P.A.
- A$AP Ferg ft. Future - New Level
- A$AP Mob - Yamborghini High
- A$AP Ferg ft. Big Sean - World Is Mine
- Joey Badass - Devastated
- Kaytranada ft Syd - You're The One
- Kevin Hart aka Chocolate Droppa ft Trey Songz - Push It On Me
- Goldlink - Fall In Love

=== 2017 ===
- A$AP Ferg ft. Remy Ma - East Coast
- A$AP Ferg ft. A$AP Rocky, Rick Ross, Busta Rhymes, Dave East - East Coast (Remix)
- Mountain Dew x NBA ft. Joey Badass - Victory (Courtside Project)
- Shah Rukh Khan x Diplo - Phurrr
- Jaden Smith - Watch Me
- Desiigner ft. Gucci Mane - Liife
- Tyga ft. Ty Dolla $ign - Move To LA
- 24HRS ft. Wiz Khalifa, Ty Dolla $ign - What You Like
- Vic Mensa ft. Pharrell, Pusha T - OMG

=== 2018 ===
- Wu-Tang Clan - For The Children: 25 Years of Enter The Wu-Tang (36 Chambers)
- Offset & Metro Boomin ft. Ric Flair - Ric Flair Drip
- Diplo ft. Desiigner - Suicidal
- Diljit Dosanjh - Big Scene
- Belly ft. NAV - Maintain
- Ava Max - Sweet But Psycho
- Abir - Young & Rude
- Maxo Kream - Roaches
- Gashi ft DJ Snake, French Montana - Creep On Me
- Nghtmre ft. A$AP Ferg - Redline

=== 2019 ===
- NY Knicks - We Are New York (Commercial)
- Sony - 360 Audio (Commercial)
- Adidas, Highsnobiety - Night Shift (Commercial)
- Gentle Monster - 13 (Commercial)
- Seeb, Olivia O'Brien, Space Primates - Fade Out
- Madeon - All My Friends (Producer)
- Mariah Carey - All I Want For Christmas Is You (Photoshoot)
- A$AP Ferg ft. A$AP Rocky - PUPS
- Maxo Kream - Meet Again
- Abir - Reunion

=== 2020 ===
- Lil Tjay - Losses
- RMR - I'm Not Over You (Desus & Mero)
- Comethazine - No Front
- Boogie ft. Joey Bada$$ - Outside

=== 2021 ===
- Calboy ft. Lil Wayne - Miseducation
- Shy Glizzy ft. RMR - White Lies
- Rich The Kid - Richard Millie Patek
- Curated by Rico Nasty | New Classic Crocs Sandal (Commercial)
- DJ Clark Kent Shares His Biggest eBay Sneaker Shopping Tips (Commercial)
- Greetings From Orchard Beach With J Balvin (Desus & Mero)
- For the Culture: Bodega Boys Tour the Metropolitan Museum of Art (Desus & Mero)
- Yo-Yo Ma & the Bodega Boys Collab on Cellos, DMX & More (Desus & Mero)
- Good Wholesome Fun ft. Lil Nas X (Desus & Mero)
- Barry Jenkins on Trauma in Media & Auditioning for Moonlight 2 (Desus & Mero)
- Lil Dicky & GaTa Put IRL Friendship on FXX's "Dave" (Desus & Mero)
- A$AP Rocky on Swedish Jail, New Music, & Rihanna (Desus & Mero)
- F1 Legend Lewis Hamilton Races D&M, Talks Met Gala (Desus & Mero)
- Snapple Presents A Corner Story (Branded Content, Documentary)
- Facebook Gaming #PLAYLOUD (Branded Content, Documentary)

=== 2022 ===
- UPS x Might Dream ft. Pharrell Williams (Branded Content)
- Square - Square Kitchen ft. Daron The Chef (Branded Content)
- Google x Tech Equity Collective - Something In The Water Campaign (Branded Content, Motion Graphics)
- Wu-Tang 'Forever' Album 25th Anniversary Documentary (Branded Content)
- Lit Day Drinking & Dallas BBQ ft. Seth Meyers (Desus & Mero)
- Abbott Elementary's Janelle James Helps Kids Keep It Real (Desus & Mero)
- How to Thrift w/ HBO's John Wilson (Desus & Mero)
- Armani White - Billie Eilish (Executive Producer)
- Skilliebeng ft. French Montana, Fivio Foreign - Whap Whap Remix (Director)
- Freddie Dredd - Want (Executive Producer)
