= Peso (song) =

2011 song by ASAP Rocky

Single by ASAP Rocky

from the album Live. Love. ASAP
- Released: July 21, 2011
- Recorded: 2011
- Genre: Cloud rap; East Coast hip-hop
- Length: 2:50
- Label: ASAP Worldwide; Polo Grounds; RCA
- Songwriters: Rakim Mayers; Tyshaun Holloway; James Harris III; Terry Lewis
- Producer: ASAP Ty Beats

ASAP Rocky singles chronology
"Peso" (2011)	"Purple Swag" (2011)

Music video
- "Peso" on YouTube

"Peso" is the debut single by American rapper ASAP Rocky. It was released through ASAP Worldwide, Polo Grounds Music, and RCA Records as the lead single from his debut mixtape Live. Love. ASAP (2011). The track was originally leaked online and began receiving radio airplay within weeks, propelling the cloud rap genre into mainstream attention. It was written by ASAP Rocky alongside fellow ASAP Mob member, ASAP Ty Beats, who also produced the song. The song contains a sample of "No One's Gonna Love You" by The S.O.S. Band; as such, the song's writers, Jimmy Jam and Terry Lewis, are also credited.

The song became ASAP Rocky's breakthrough hit (alongside "Purple Swag"), peaking at number 75 on the Billboard Hot R&B/Hip-Hop Songs in the United States of America. It was later certified Platinum by the Recording Industry Association of America (RIAA) for equivalent sales of 1,000,000 units, and was certified Gold by Music Canada (MC) for equivalent sales of 40,000 units. A music video for the song was released on December 13, 2011, and currently has over 81 millions views as of 2025.

== Release ==
On July 21, 2011, "Peso" was released the lead single to ASAP Rocky's debut mixtape, Live. Love. ASAP (2011), through ASAP Worldwide, Polo Grounds Music, and RCA Records.

It was later released in the United Kingdom on February 19, 2012 under RCA, serving as his debut single in the country.

== Critical reception ==
"Peso" received positive reviews from music critics. Writing for NME, Rebecca Schiller called the song "a dreamy psychedelic jam that, despite the drug references and gunshots, displays Rocky Harlem’s desire to move New York hip-hop out of clichésville." Martyn Young of DIY also praised how it avoided clichés associated with hip-hop, opining: "It is easy to see why Rocky has caused so much excitement; offering a new, fresh and inventive take on hip-hop and eschewing the traditional rap clichés, he is hip-hop's most exciting new talent." Young complimented ASAP Ty Beats's production, noting its "beautifully hypnotic and almost psychedelic" qualities, comparing its sound to a combination of "experimental electronica and thrilling rap". In a 2011 article, The Guardian's Paul Lester referred to it as ASAP Rocky's best song, writing that "Peso, with its avant-lounge Jet Age of Tomorrow stylings and purple-drank slurred sludginess, is up there with the year's finest".

== Music video ==
On December 13, 2011, the music video, directed by Abteen Bagheri, premiered on MTV2. After more than 17 million views on YouTube, ASAP Rocky was invited to tour as the opening act for Drake.

== Charts ==
Chart (2012)	Peak position
US Hot R&B/Hip-Hop Songs (Billboard)	75

Chart (2026)	Peak position
Lithuania (AGATA)	94

== Certifications ==
Certifications and sales for "Peso"
Region	Certification	Certified units/sales
Canada (Music Canada)	Gold	40,000^{‡}
New Zealand (RMNZ)	Gold	15,000^{‡}
United States (RIAA)	Platinum	1,000,000^{‡}
^{‡} Sales+streaming figures based on certification alone.
