= Raf (song) =

2017 single by ASAP Mob

Single by ASAP Mob featuring ASAP Rocky, Playboi Carti, Quavo, Lil Uzi Vert and Frank Ocean

from the album Cozy Tapes Vol. 2: Too Cozy
- Released: May 15, 2017
- Genre: Hip hop; trap
- Length: 4:15
- Label: ASAP Worldwide; Polo Grounds; RCA
- Songwriters: Rakim Mayers; Jordan Carter; Quavious Marshall; Symere Woods; Frank Ocean; David Cunningham; Joe Thornalley; Michael Uzowuru
- Producers: Dun Deal; Vegyn (add.); Uzowuru (add.)

ASAP Mob singles chronology
"Wrong" (2017)	"Raf" (2017)	"Feels So Good" (2017)

ASAP Rocky singles chronology
"Blended Family (What You Do for Love)" (2016)	"Raf" (2017)	"Who Dat Boy" (2017)

Playboi Carti singles chronology
"Magnolia" (2017)	"Raf" (2017)	"Green & Purple" (2017)

Quavo singles chronology
"Paper Ova Here" (2017)	"Raf" (2017)	"Portland" (2017)

Lil Uzi Vert singles chronology
"Wokeuplikethis" (2017)	"Raf" (2017)	"Water Leak" (2017)

Frank Ocean singles chronology
"Slide On Me (Remix)" (2017)	"Raf" (2017)	"911 / Mr. Lonely" (2017)

Music video
- "RAF" on YouTube

"Raf" (stylized in all caps) is a song by American hip hop collective ASAP Mob, featuring collective members ASAP Rocky and Playboi Carti as well as Quavo, Lil Uzi Vert, and Frank Ocean. It was released on May 15, 2017 as the lead single from the collective's second studio album Cozy Tapes Vol. 2: Too Cozy. The song pays tribute to Belgian fashion designer Raf Simons.

== Background ==
ASAP Rocky posted a snippet of the song on Twitter in January 2017, and previewed the song again at the 2017 Rolling Loud festival. The song premiered on Frank Ocean's Blonded Radio on May 15, 2017 in two versions. It is named after fashion designer Raf Simons, whom Rocky is a longtime admirer of. When Simons was selected to be on the Time 100, Rocky wrote for Time:

I feel like Raf Simons is important for the culture based on the fact that he built a whole new religion around fashion. It's to the point where kids, male and female alike, will get in full arguments over why he's the greatest. And it's amazing how his prior work, his archive, is more important and relevant than anything that's out today.

== Content ==
In the song, ASAP Rocky sends warnings to not touch his designer clothing, notably Raf Simons-designed ones. Throughout Rocky's verse, Playboi Carti provides background vocals with ad-libs. The other artists each rap about owning designer clothes, also warning not to get close to their expensive garment.

The two versions of the song that were originally released featured different verses from Frank Ocean. One version features a hook from Rocky, on which he raps, "Please don't touch my Raf."

== Music video ==
The music video was released on July 24, 2017. Directed by Alec Eskander, it finds ASAP Rocky, Playboi Carti, and Quavo modeling clothes from Raf Simon's archive. Simon's Fall/Winter 1995-1996 and Spring/Summer 2002 collections are referenced in the clip. The video uses a shortened version of the song which excludes Lil Uzi Vert and Frank Ocean's verses.

== Charts ==
Chart (2017)	Peak position
Canada Hot 100 (Billboard)	82
New Zealand Heatseekers (RMNZ)	5
US Bubbling Under Hot 100 (Billboard)	18
US Bubbling Under R&B/Hip-Hop Singles (Billboard)	10

== Certifications ==
Region	Certification	Certified units/sales
Australia (ARIA)	Gold	35,000^{‡}
New Zealand (RMNZ)	Gold	15,000^{‡}
United States (RIAA)	Platinum	1,000,000^{‡}
^{‡} Sales+streaming figures based on certification alone.
