= Trillmatic =

2013 song by ASAP Mob

Single by ASAP Mob featuring ASAP Nast and Method Man

from the album L.O.R.D.
- Released: December 4, 2013
- Recorded: 2013
- Genre: East Coast hip hop
- Length: 3:59
- Label: ASAP Worldwide; Polo Grounds; RCA
- Songwriters: Tariq Devega; Clifford Smith; Curtis Williams
- Producer: ASAP Ty Beats

ASAP Mob singles chronology
"Bath Salts" (2012)	"Trillmatic" (2013)	"Xscape" (2014)

ASAP Nast singles chronology
"Trillmatic" (2013)	"Hella Hoes" (2014)

Method Man singles chronology
"The Pit" (2013)	"Trillmatic" (2013)

"Trillmatic" is a song by American rapper ASAP Nast from the hip hop collective ASAP Mob. It was released on December 4, 2013. It was originally intended to be a first single from ASAP Mob's debut studio album L.O.R.D., which was originally scheduled to be released around 2014, but the album, however, was scrapped. The song, produced by ASAP Mob's ASAP Ty Beats features East Coast rapper Method Man. The song has since peaked at number 29 on the UK R&B Chart.

== Background and composition ==
The song originally appeared as a one-minute snippet on the end of ASAP Ant's "The Way It Go". On December 4, 2013, "Trillmatic" by ASAP Mob's ASAP Nast featuring Wu-Tang Clan's Method Man, and produced by ASAP Ty Beats, was originally released as the first single from their debut album L.O.R.D.. But, on September 26, 2014, fellow ASAP Mob member and general manager, Steven "ASAP Yams" Rodriguez, announced on his Tumblr account, that the album was scrapped.

In an April 2014 interview with HipHopDX, Nast spoke on the song saying, "Basically what I wanted to do with that was put people in that time machine and bring them back to 1997, 1996—with Wu-Tang Clan, A Tribe Called Quest, AZ, Gang Starr—all these guys were coming up, and it was all about rapping. It wasn't about your fancy clothes. Well it was, but to an extent. "Trillmatic" was basically to showcase that we're in 2014, but we could still shine with the whole Golden Era. So I just wanted to put people in that zone, and that was it. I think we got the point across."

The song features a hard-hitting, vintage 1990s boom bap beat. The song title, "Trillmatic", is a reference to Nas' debut album Illmatic. It contains a sample of "The World Is a Ghetto" by War from the 1972 album of the same name.

== Music video ==
The music video for the song was mainly filmed at the Castle Hill Houses in The Bronx, New York City. The video was released on December 4, 2013. The group appeared on BET's 106 & Park to premiere the video. The video was directed by Jonah Schwartz. All the members of ASAP Mob including ASAP Rocky and ASAP Ferg make appearances in the video. In the video the group roam around the streets of New York City from the Bronx to Madison Square Garden.

== Critical reception ==
"Trillmatic" was met with generally positive reviews. Billy Johnson Jr. of Rolling Stone praised both rappers performances, the refrain and the song's production. Andy Bustard of The BoomBox stated, "Trillmatic" "is a fun and refreshing throwback to 1990s East Coast rap." Nast has "two stellar verses and a surprisingly dope hook, but it’s Johnny Blaze who lights up the track with an effortlessly acrobatic guest appearance. A$AP Ty Beats' sample-laced, boom bap production proves that the true New York essence is hiding beneath all that Houston flavor after all." Jeff Rosenthal of Complex said, "it's been years since Method Man sounded so urgent as he does" on "Trillmatic".

== Chart performance ==
Chart performance for "Trillmatic"
Chart (2014)	Peak position
UK Singles (The Official Charts Company)	193
UK Hip Hop/R&B (Official Charts)	29

== Release history ==
Release history and formats for "Trillmatic"
Country	Date	Format	Label
United States	December 4, 2013	Digital download	ASAP Worldwide, Polo Grounds, RCA Records
United Kingdom	January 16, 2014	Urban contemporary radio	ASAP Worldwide, Polo Grounds, RCA Records
