= Emotions (Nine Vicious album) =

Studio album by Nine Vicious
- Released: April 3, 2026
- Genre: Hip-hop
- Length: 71:25
- Labels: Studio Addicts; Create Music
- Producers: Nine Vicious; 10kinmydufflebag; 406ahmad; Bella; Elliot Latham; Jwade; Kacy Hill; Nosaint; Patrick Garza; R8; YUME

Nine Vicious chronology
B4EM (2026)	Emotions (2026)	Sedition (2026)

Emotions (stylized in all caps) is the third studio album by American rapper Nine Vicious. It was released through Studio Addicts and Create Music on April 3, 2026. The album is a successor to the previous EP, B4EM released January 31, 2026. It features a sole guest appearance from Kacy Hill. Upon release, Emotions debuted at #102 on the Billboard 200 which was his first ever placement.

== Background, promotion, and release ==
Leading up to Emotions, Nine Vicious kept his momentum in the underground rap scene by teasing and releasing new music after the release of For Nothing. Before the album, he has released B4EM, which was an extended play (EP) that introduced the next sound that would define Emotions, and several singles, some including up to 5 songs and as long as 11 minutes, released exclusively on SoundCloud. Nine Vicious would gain more attention with his appearance on Kanye West's twelfth studio album, Bully, with his background vocals on tracks "This a Must" and "Mama's Favorite".

=== Release ===
Upon release, a tour in support of the album, titled Emotions: Nine Vicious A Tour was issued, the tour spanned from Europe to North America and started on July 3 in Prague and ended on August August 23 in Seattle, Washington. During the tour, a worn pair of Nine Vicious' underwear, which had the album's name and three tour dates written on it, was sold for one thousand dollars.

== Critical reception ==
Professional ratings
Review scores
Source	Rating
AllMusic	2.5/5 stars
Pitchfork	4.8/10

Olivier Lafontant of Pitchfork rated the album a 4.8 out of 10, with him writing how the project does not feel genuine, and how shallow and repetitive the project sounds. AllMusic awarded the album two and a half stars out of five in their review; their writer acknowledges the versatility in the album, however also found it exhaustingly long, describing it as an "endless blur". In their ranking, Dimas Sanfiorenzo of Complex labeled Emotions as one of the best rap albums of 2026 as of so far, writing how his time with Young Thug allowed him to develop as an artist and make him put out quality projects.

== Track listing ==
Emotions track listing
No.	Title	Producer(s)	Length
1.	"Talk About It"	406ahmad	3:24
2.	"Amazing"	Nine Vicious; Bella; Jwade; Patrick Garza	2:46
3.	"Posing Tonight"	Patrick Garza	4:02
4.	"Rolling Loud"	Patrick Garza; Elliot Latham	2:53
5.	"Fashion Killa"	406ahmad	2:20
6.	"Purple Swag"	Patrick Garza	2:20
7.	"Clock It"	Patrick Garza	2:25
8.	"Trevon O'Ryan Echols"	406ahmad	3:22
9.	"Vivienne Westwood / RIP"	Bella	4:04
10.	"Want U"	Bella	2:16
11.	"Project4play/Svj"	R8; Patrick Garza; Jwade	5:21
12.	"Molly Ecstasy"	R8	3:54
13.	"Sunset Hill" (featuring Kacy Hill)	Kacy Hill	2:50
14.	"U Dig Det"	Patrick Garza; Jwade	1:50
15.	"My Whole Heart"	406ahmad	3:14
16.	"Julia"	406ahmad	2:58
17.	"Need"	YUME	2:45
18.	"Love Album"	R8; Jwade	2:28
19.	"Italy"	R8; 10kinmydufflebag	2:21
20.	"Electric Feel"	406ahmad	3:13
21.	"Lifes Funny"	406ahmad	2:17
22.	"Forgot"	406ahmad	3:39
23.	"Blowing Emotions"	Nosaint; Patrick Garza	4:43
Total length:			71:25

=== Sample credits ===
- "Talk About It" contains a sample of "The Meaning of Love" by Marker Starling.
- "Amazing" contains a sample of "Sex with Me" by Rihanna.
- "Fashion Killa" contains a sample of "Fashion Killa" by ASAP Rocky.
- "Purple Swag" contains a sample of "Purple Swag" by ASAP Rocky.
- "Electric Feel" contains a sample of "Electric Feel" by MGMT.
- ”Lifes Funny” contains a sample of “Ironic” by Alanis Morissette.

== Charts ==
Chart performance for Emotions
Chart (2026)	Peak position
US Billboard 200	102
US Top R&B/Hip-Hop Albums (Billboard)	30
US Independent Albums (Billboard)	16
