= Live. Love. ASAP =

Mixtape by ASAP Rocky
- Released: October 31, 2011
- Studio: Ishlab Music (New York City)
- Genre: Hip-hop
- Length: 54:39
- Labels: Polo Grounds; RCA
- Producers: ASAP Ty Beats; Beautiful Lou; Clams Casino; DJ Burn One; Lyle LeDuff; The Olympicks; Soufien3000; SpaceGhostPurrp

ASAP Rocky chronology
Live. Love. ASAP (2011)	Long. Live. ASAP (2013)

Singles from Live. Love. ASAP
- 1. "Peso" Released: November 16, 2011; 2. "Purple Swag" Released: December 5, 2011

Live. Love. ASAP (stylized as LIVE.LOVE.A$AP) is the debut mixtape by American rapper ASAP Rocky, who released it as a free digital download on October 31, 2011. It features production by Clams Casino, ASAP Ty Beats, DJ Burn One, and SpaceGhostPurrp, among others. The mixtape also features guest rappers Schoolboy Q and Fat Tony, as well as members of ASAP Mob, ASAP Rocky's hip-hop collective.

The mixtape's music incorporates stylistic and production elements of hip-hop scenes distinct from ASAP Rocky's hometown New York scene, particularly Southern hip-hop. Its production features woozy soundscapes, low and mid-tempo beats, and chopped and screwed choruses. His lyrics deal with themes about moral decay, including promiscuity and drug use, expressed through his boastful, tempered flow.

The mixtape was promoted with two singles, "Peso" and "Purple Swag", which garnered ASAP Rocky mainstream attention and led to his first record deal. Live. Love. ASAP received widespread acclaim from critics, who praised the production aesthetic and ASAP Rocky's charismatic rapping style. It was included in several year-end top album lists by critics and publications. On October 29, 2021, ASAP Rocky re-released the mixtape on all streaming platforms.

== Background ==
In May 2011, ASAP Rocky quit selling drugs and decided to focus on a career in rapping. He released a music video for his song "Purple Swag" in July, garnering Internet buzz and attention from record labels, despite negative feedback from his native hip-hop scene in New York. He was courted by several labels, including the RCA-distributed Polo Grounds Music. However, he held off from any deal with a label, instead wanting to explore other pursuits. He and Polo Grounds president Bryan Leach, also a Harlem native, subsequently spent time talking about music and lifestyles.

In August 2011, ASAP Rocky followed with "Peso", which first appeared on Internet blogs and eventually received radio airplay on New York City's Hot 97. The song also earned him respect in the New York scene, of which he later said, "It brings a tear to my eye to see native New York people give me my props because New York is stubborn and arrogant". After a bidding war among labels, he signed a record deal with Polo Grounds and RCA on October 14. It was worth $3 million, with $1.7 million for his solo work and $1.3 million to fund his company ASAP Worldwide. He said that he sought a "bigger platform" for him and his collective with the deal. His first studio album planned to be under the deal, but it allowed him to continue releasing mixtapes through RED Distribution.

== Recording and production ==
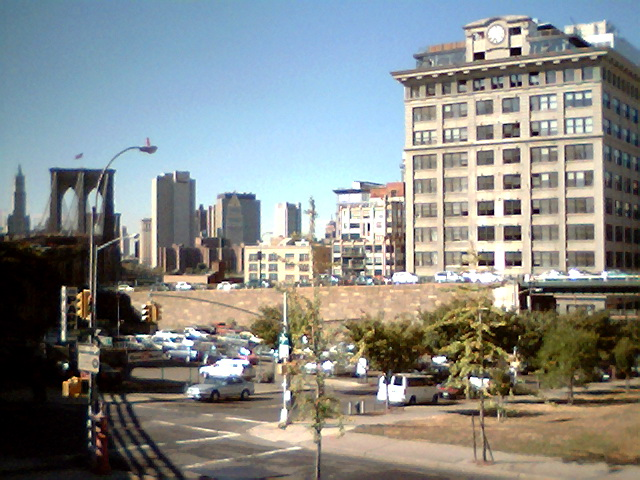
Dumbo, Brooklyn, where ASAP Rocky recorded the mixtape

ASAP Rocky recorded Live.Love.ASAP at Ishlab Music Studio in Dumbo, a neighborhood in Brooklyn, New York. It was engineered by the studio's primary technicians Daniel Lynas and Frans Mernick. Several producers on the mixtape were associated with ASAP Mob, a collective that was formed by ASAP Rocky in 2007 and featured rappers, record producers, and music video directors. ASAP Ty Beats, SpaceGhostPurrp, and Clams Casino, who had produced several of ASAP Rocky's previous songs, were his principal collaborators in developing the songs' woozy soundscapes. Casino previously produced for Lil B and Main Attrakionz, who appears on the mixtape. ASAP Rocky met him after he remixed Casino's song "Numb", which was later recorded as "Demons" for the mixtape, and they both tried to contact one another as respective fans. Their first recording for the mixtape was "Wassup". In August, he rented a pied-à-terre in Midtown Manhattan and housed members of ASAP Mob during Hurricane Irene's landfall in New York City.

== Musical style ==
On LiveLoveASAP, New York has a new role. Once the universal donor, it's now the universal recipient. Other cities have been playing that role for years. As New York classicists were holding their ground, the rest of hip-hop looked on, amused, and kept working, taking in outside influences and building their own sounds ... LiveLoveASAP would be comprehensible in all of those places.

— Jon Caramanica (2012)

Musically, Live. Love. ASAP incorporates characteristics from hip-hop scenes outside of ASAP Rocky's hometown scene in Harlem, New York, including Midwest and Southern hip-hop, particularly the hip-hop production of Houston's scene. He grew up listening to Southern hip-hop artists such as Geto Boys, UGK, Swishahouse, Mike Jones, Paul Wall, and Slim Thug. He also grew up listening to artists of disparate music genres, including Hope Sandoval, CeeLo Green, and MGMT, influences that music journalist Paul Lester attributes to the mixtape's "languid but futuristic sonics". The beats on Live. Love. ASAP are generally low or mid-tempo and hazy-sounding. The songs also have chopped and screwed choruses. Clams Casino's moody, atmospheric production is characterized by fragmented, downbeat vocal samples, basic drum tracks, and ambient, hypnotic synths. Songs produced by DJ Burn One, Beautiful Lou, and Soufein3000 incorporate more Southern hip-hop elements.

AllMusic editor Andre Barnes views the mixtape's music as distinct from East Coast hip-hop, calling it "sonically out of place, recasting the feel of East Coast hip-hop into a quintessential, albeit progressive southern aesthetic with its country funk and cosmic, syrupy backdrops." Jon Caramanica calls Live. Love. ASAP "placeless and universal, an album that sounds as if it has ingested the last 20 years of hip-hop's travels and would be comfortable anywhere." Caramanica notes characteristics of various hip-hop scenes other than that of New York's scene, including "chewy, slowed-down homages to Houston" and "nods to New Orleans and Atlanta and the Bay Area and everywhere else hip-hop is made." Alvin Aqua Blanco of HipHopDX writes that the music's grooves "generally stay on the DJ Screw side of the BPMs". Consequence editor Mike Madden notes its musical dynamic as "Southern flavors crossbreed[ing] with plenty of cloudy ambient-rap moments" and views that the cadences of the beats consequently "dictate" ASAP Rocky's rapping style.

The epic-sounding, Clams Casino-produced opening track, "Palace", has Rocky acknowledging Southern hip-hop's influence on his sound: "Influenced by Houston / you can hear it in my music". "Wassup" has an ethereal, Houston-inspired soundscape. However, Chase McMullen of Beats Per Minute observes from the mixtape's sound the "threatening vibe" of Raekwon's 1995 album Only Built 4 Cuban Linx... and a grime influence, commenting that "while southern influences currently dominate much of current hip-hop, Rocky places as much importance on the Wu as he does Three 6." Paul Lester of The Guardian compares "Peso" to the stylings of The Jet Age of Tomorrow. "Trilla" has a funk and boom bap influence in its production.

== Themes ==
"Palace"
ASAP Rocky references drugs, women, and fashion, and raps over the track's provocative choral progressions.

The mixtape's subject matter of moral decay incorporates controversial thematic elements of mainstream hip-hop, including misogyny, glorified male promiscuity, and excessive drug use. Songs such as "Leaf", "Get Lit", and "Roll One Up" are odes to cannabis smoking. Music writers note the mixtape's perspective as that of a self-assured youth concerned with simple pleasures and "keeping it trill (true and real)". Evan Rytlewski of The A.V. Club comments that ASAP Rocky mostly "riffs on his four great loves: syrup, weed, women, and fashion". Calling it a "guilty pleasure" for hip-hop purists, AllMusic's Andre Barnes characterizes the mixtape's subject matter as "the antithesis of conscious rap" and his lyricism as "sedate charisma and mannerisms leaning toward UGK-inspired bravado", adding that it displaces "the intricate lyrical concepts that evoke intense listening and the undeniable slang definitive of traditional East Coast rap music".

"Purple Swag", a woozy-sounding homage to Houston's hip-hop scene, references the purple drank popularized by the scene's community and used recreationally by ASAP Rocky and his collective. His lyrics on "Peso" depict a charismatic, attractive persona, with him referring to himself as a "pretty motherfucker". The song also features lyrics about his eccentric and flamboyant fashion sense: "Raf Simons, Rick Owens / usually what I’m dressed in". He also name-drops fashion designer Jeremy Scott throughout the mixtape.

ASAP Rocky's flow throughout the mixtape is tempered, and his delivery ranges from nonchalant rhymes to forceful double time. Jon Caramanica writes that the subject matter, including "straight-talking boasts" and "heavy intake of drugs and women", is revealed by his "bursts of short phrases, rhymed in their entirety." On "Palace", ASAP Rocky demonstrates alliterative lyricism and singsong cadence and flow. His flow patterns have been compared by writers to those of Cleveland-based hip-hop group Bone Thugs-n-Harmony. August Brown of the Los Angeles Times writes that "his reserved, steely delivery owes equal debts to Houston's syrup daze and Dipset's uptown intensity". He addresses his rapping style on "Purple Swag": "I'm Texas trill, Texas trill, but in NY we spit it slow". On "Leaf", he addresses hip-hoppers' criticism of his style: "They say I sound like André / mixed with Kanye / a little bit of Max / a little bit of Wiz / a little bit of that / a little bit of this / get off my dick".

== Marketing ==
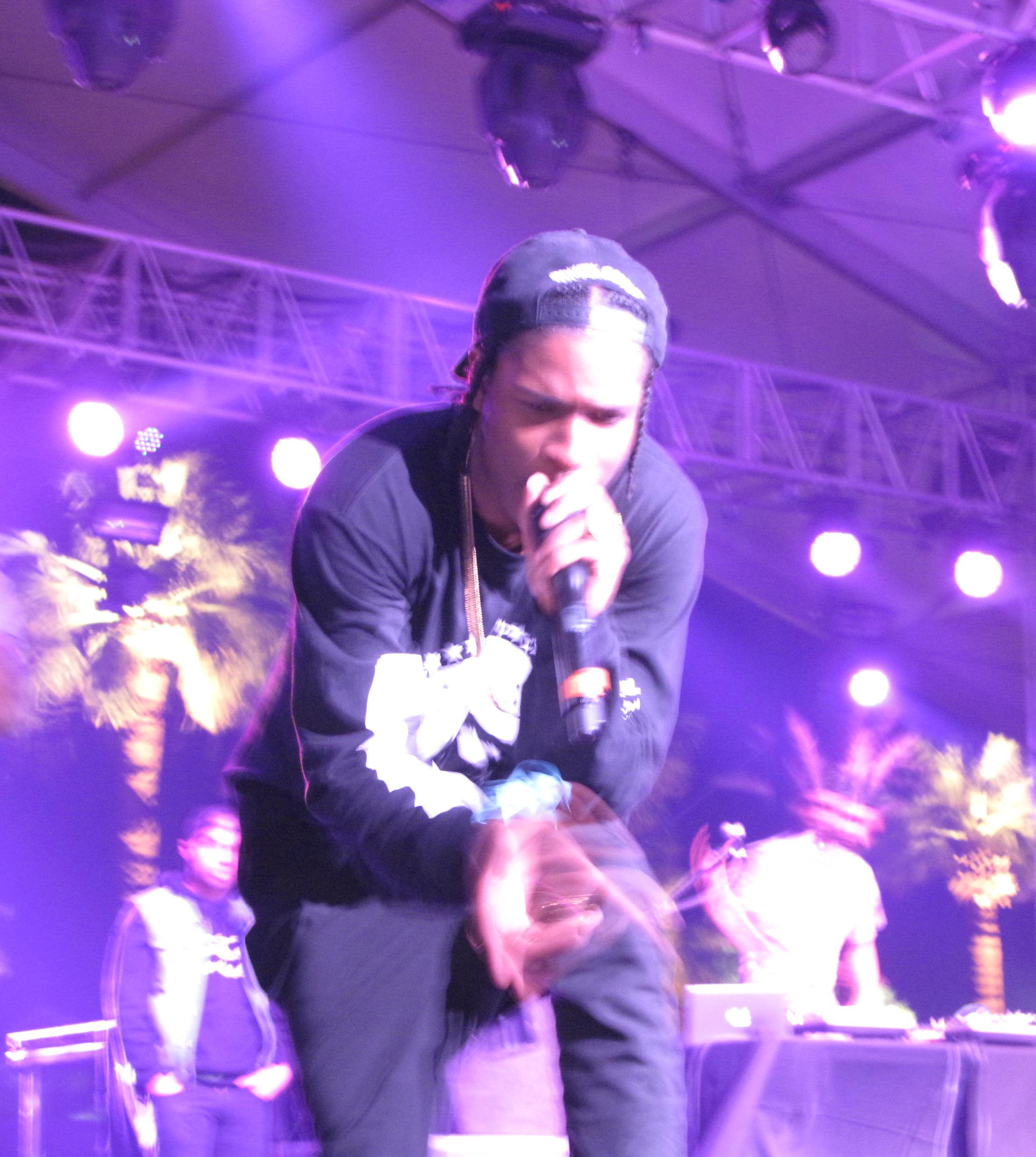
Rocky at Coachella in 2012

An anticipated release among Internet tastemakers, Live. Love. ASAP was released as a free digital download on October 31, 2011. Two days after its release, A$AP Rocky proclaimed it to be "better than a lot of people's albums". The mixtape did not chart after its release.

The mixtape's lead single "Peso" was officially released on November 16. It charted for nine weeks and peaked at number 81 on the US Billboard Hot R&B/Hip-Hop Songs in February 2012. The second single "Purple Swag" was released on December 5. Previously released as a YouTube video, the mixtape version features guest verses by SpaceGhostPurrp and ASAP Nast. A music video for "Wassup" was directed by ASAP Rocky with magazine editor and journalist Andy Capper. His videos depicted a glamorous and dissolute lifestyle led by him and his crew, with images of excess and fashion, including gold fronts, liquor containers, and designer clothing.

In the months leading up to the mixtape's release, ASAP Rocky performed several low-key venues in New York, including the Alife Rivington Club, a party for Fool's Gold Records, a Diplomats concert, and Santos Party House. He also played CMJ's music festival in October. In 2012, he toured on Drake's Club Paradise Tour and performed at several music festivals, including South by Southwest, Summer Jam, Pitchfork Music Festival, and Rock the Bells. The touring experience allowed ASAP Rocky to work on his live performance and stage presence.

Reportedly, as a part of ASAP Rocky's record deal, there were plans for Live. Love. ASAP to be re-released for retail by Polo Grounds, RCA, and his then-created ASAP Worldwide in 2012. He had said that it would have been a "deluxe version". On October 29, 2021, the mixtape was released for the first time on music streaming services. The rereleased edition featured the new song "Sandman", produced by Kelvin Krash and Rocky's longtime collaborator Clams Casino, although "Kissin' Pink and "Out of This World" were omitted.

== Critical reception ==
Live. Love. ASAP ratings
Aggregate scores
Source	Rating
AnyDecentMusic?	7.6/10
Metacritic	83/100
Review scores
Source	Rating
AllMusic	4/5 stars
The A.V. Club	B
Beats Per Minute	85%
Consequence	4/5 stars
The Irish Times	4/5 stars
Okayplayer	88/100
Pitchfork	8.2/10
PopMatters	8/10
Sputnikmusic	4/5
XXL	4/5

Live. Love. ASAP was met with widespread critical acclaim. At Metacritic, which assigns a normalized rating out of 100 to reviews from professional critics, the mixtape received an average score of 83, based on 12 reviews. Aggregator AnyDecentMusic? gave it 7.6 out of 10, based on their assessment of the critical consensus.

Reviewing for The Irish Times, Jim Carroll hailed the mixtape as "a dashing statement of intent", while Pitchfork's Jeff Weiss said it is a "triumph of immaculate taste" that shows "Rocky embodies the sweat-free cool of someone who has stolen the test and memorized the answers ahead of time." AllMusic's Andre Barnes wrote of the mixtape's appeal to hip-hop purists and listeners, "For the saints, Live Love ASAP is nothing short of a guilty pleasure ... But for the aesthetically inclined, Live Love ASAP is a marvel of contemporary rap music, despite its abounding moral decay." Colin McGowan from Cokemachineglow cited his ability to "command a variety of sounds" as the reason it sounds "unified without drifting into monochrome territory". McGowan viewed that, although his "Wayne-ian pattern" is not as "fluid" nor "dotted with exuberant metaphors", his sensibilities make up for technical shortcomings:

[ASAP Rocky] enunciates powerfully from within the pocket of the beat, always sounds like he's rapping in facts, and knows how to turn a phrase. His sense of sound and the function of internal rhyme gives the illusion his raps are more complicated than they are. He understands the infectious way a line like "My all gold grill give 'er cold chills / say she got that coke feel 'cause I'm so trill" can pinball around a listener's ear.

BBC Music's Ele Beattie advised listeners, "If you've come looking for tight flows and witty wordplay, Rocky ain't your man. But attitude and production will win you over." Evan Rytlewski of The A.V. Club felt that "he's a magnetic rapper, and his delivery is reliably sharp, but he rarely uses it to say anything." Instead, Rytlewski commended ASAP for "curating exceptional beats and knowing when to get out of their way." He added that, "by enlisting some of the Internet's most forward-thinking young producers ... [Rocky]'s crafted the year's most stylish mix-tape, a melting pot of nearly every major underground rap trend of the last 16 months, all pitched to the intoxicating slow crawl of Houston screw music." Although he noted a "lack of so-called substance", David Amidon of PopMatters viewed that the mixtape's release helped materialize "the positive influence of the internet on the next generation of hip-hop". Jon Caramanica of The New York Times cited its two singles as "among the year's best hip-hop songs."

=== Accolades ===
The mixtape was included in several year-end top album lists by critics and publications. It was named the ninth-best album of 2011 by Stereogum in the publication's year-end list. It was ranked number 10 on Filter's top albums list. Gorilla vs. Bear ranked the mixtape number five and stated, "Sometimes good instincts, an effortless flow, off-the-charts charisma, and just sounding a lot cooler than everyone else goes a long way." In ranking it number nine, Complex commended ASAP Rocky's "defined sound and unique aesthetic", calling him "electric and precise on the microphone" and writing that the mixtape's beats "bang so hard they bring Houston to Harlem." Los Angeles Times staff writer August Brown ranked the mixtape number two on her top albums list and wrote that it "cemented" his reputation, while citing Clams Casino's beats as "some of the year's most imaginative, evocative hip-hop productions." Jonah Weiner of Slate ranked it number five on his list and, although he cited him as part of "hip-hop's abiding misogynist" in 2011, saying that he and his contemporaries "trash so many other genre orthodoxies."

Live. Love. ASAP also earned ASAP Rocky a nomination for BBC's Sound of 2012 poll. In October 2013, Complex named the mixtape the tenth best hip-hop album of the last five years. In 2019, Pitchfork ranked Live. Love. ASAP at number 137 on their list of "The 200 Best Albums of the 2010s".

== Track listing ==
Credits for all tracks except "Purple Swag: Chapter 2", "Kissin' Pink" and "Out of This World" are adapted from Qobuz.

Live. Love. ASAP track listing
No.	Title	Writer(s)	Producer(s)	Length
1.	"Palace"	Rakim Mayers; Michael Volpe; Karl Jenkins; Mike Ratledge	Clams Casino	2:42
2.	"Peso"	Mayers; Tyshaun Holloway; James Harris III; Terry Lewis	ASAP Ty Beats	2:47
3.	"Bass"	Mayers; Volpe; Imogen Heap	Clams Casino	3:17
4.	"Wassup"	Mayers; Volpe; Mimi Goese	Clams Casino	2:38
5.	"Brand New Guy" (featuring Schoolboy Q)	Mayers; Quincy Hanley; Lyle LeDuff; Don Cannon	LeDuff; Cannon^{[a]}	4:48
6.	"Purple Swag: Chapter 2" (featuring SpaceGhostPurrp and ASAP Nast)	Mayers; Holloway; Markese Rolle; Tariq Devega	ASAP Ty Beats	2:47
7.	"Get Lit" (featuring Fat Tony)	Mayers; Anthony Obi; Soufien Rhouat	Soufien3000	2:58
8.	"Trilla" (featuring ASAP Twelvyy and ASAP Nast)	Mayers; Devega; Jamel Phillips; Louis Hernandez; Willie Hines; Andre Weston; James Brown; Charles Bobbit; Fred Wesley; Barrett Strong; Norman Whitfield	Beautiful Lou	4:04
9.	"Keep It G" (featuring Chace Infinite and SpaceGhostPurrp)	Mayers; Rolle; Chace Johnson	SpaceGhostPurrp	3:49
10.	"Kissin' Pink" (featuring ASAP Ferg)	Mayers; Hernandez; Darold Brown Jr.	Beautiful Lou	3:31
11.	"Houston Old Head"	Mayers; David Sweeten; Thomas McClary; Lionel Richie	DJ Burn One	4:18
12.	"Acid Drip"	Mayers; Rhouat	Soufien3000	2:43
13.	"Leaf" (featuring Main Attrakionz)	Mayers; Volpe; Charles Glover; Damondre Grice	Clams Casino	4:52
14.	"Roll One Up"	Mayers; Sweeten; William Cobham	DJ Burn One	2:39
15.	"Demons"	Mayers; Volpe; Marie-Claire D'Ubaldo; Rick Nowels; Billy Steinberg	Clams Casino	3:00
16.	"Out of This World"	Mayers; Brian Wicker; Jesse James; David Stokes	The Olympicks	2:48
Total length:				54:39

2021 streaming edition
No.	Title	Writer(s)	Producer(s)	Length
6.	"Purple Swag"	Mayers; Holloway	ASAP Ty Beats	1:58
15.	"Sandman"	Mayers; Cozzaglio; Slattery; Volpe; Magnusen; Genn	Clams Casino; Kelvin Krash	3:20
Total length:				49:06

Notes

- ^{^[a]} signifies a co-producer
- The mixtape's 2021 streaming edition excluded the tracks "Purple Swag: Chapter 2", "Kissin' Pink" and "Out of This World", while adding on "Purple Swag" and the previously unreleased "Sandman", produced by Kelvin Krash and Clams Casino.

== Personnel ==
Credits for Live. Love. ASAP adapted from AllMusic.

- ASAP Ferg – performer
- ASAP Nast – performer
- ASAP Rocky – performer, producer
- ASAP Twelvyy – performer
- ASAP Ty Beats – producer
- Beautiful Lou – producer
- Chace Infinite – performer
- Clams Casino – producer
- Daniel Lynas – engineer, mixing
- DJ Burn One – producer
- Fat Tony – performer
- Frans Mernick – assistant engineer
- Lyle LeDuff – producer
- Main Attrakionz – performer
- The Olympicks – producer
- Schoolboy Q – performer
- Soufien3000 – producer
- SpaceGhostPurrp – performer, producer

== Charts ==
=== Weekly charts ===
Weekly chart performance for Live. Love. ASAP
Chart (2021)	Peak position
Australian Albums (ARIA)	51
Belgian Albums (Ultratop Flanders)	77
Belgian Albums (Ultratop Wallonia)	185
Canadian Albums (Billboard)	45
Danish Albums (Hitlisten)	39
Dutch Albums (Album Top 100)	52
Finnish Albums (Suomen virallinen lista)	32
French Albums (SNEP)	133
Lithuanian Albums (AGATA)	22
New Zealand Albums (RMNZ)	21
Norwegian Albums (VG-lista)	15
Swiss Albums (Schweizer Hitparade)	31
US Billboard 200	43
US Top R&B/Hip-Hop Albums (Billboard)	22

=== Year-end charts ===
Year-end chart performance for Live. Love. ASAP
Chart (2025)	Peak position
Icelandic Albums (Tónlistinn)	74
