= Chynna Rogers =

American rapper (1994–2020)

Chynna
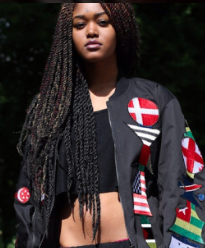
- Rogers in 2014
- Born: Chynna Marie Rogers; August 19, 1994; Philadelphia, Pennsylvania, U.S.
- Died: April 8, 2020 (aged 25); Philadelphia, Pennsylvania, U.S.
- Cause of death: Drug overdose
- Occupations: Rapper; disc jockey
- Years active: 2013–2020
- Musical career
- Genres: Alternative hip-hop
- Formerly of: ASAP Mob

Chynna Marie Rogers (August 19, 1994 – April 8, 2020), known mononymously as Chynna, was an American rapper affiliated with the ASAP Mob.

== Early life and education ==
Rogers was born in Philadelphia, Pennsylvania, where she attended Julia R. Masterman School. Throughout middle school, Chynna developed an interest in writing, and toyed with the idea of writing a book. In high school, this developed into the writing of full songs. She recorded her first song, "Selfie", in a friend's basement, soon after leaving high school.

== Career ==
Rogers was signed as a model at the age of 14 and modeled until the age of 16. Her modeling career was short, with her true passion lying in music.

Failing to attain scholarships, she discarded the idea of going to college and began taking music more seriously. Rogers became connected to ASAP Mob through ASAP Yams, whom she had approached on Twitter. After hanging outside music studios she became his intern. She struggled with addiction throughout her career. Her mentor, Yams, died in 2015 of an accidental drug overdose. Her mother, Wendy Payne, died in 2017. In an interview with Pitchfork Media in January 2018, she described how the pressures of the music industry had played a part in her addiction: 'I felt that I hadn’t gone through enough terrible stuff to deserve to have this as a career. I didn’t feel like I deserved to be making a living off talking about my life yet because I just couldn’t relate to enough people.'

Rogers released the singles "Selfie" (2013) and "Glen Coco" (2014). These were followed by her first EP, "I'm Not Here. This Isn't Happening." in 2015. On August 19, 2016, she released the EP "Ninety", celebrating her 90 days of sobriety. The following year, she released the EP "music 2 die 2". Her final EP, "in case i die First" was released in 2019.

Rogers frequently collaborated with producers 48thST, Cloud Atrium, Heaven in Stereo and 5TH DMNSN.

Her song "stupkid", was released posthumously on what would have been her 26th birthday, August 19, 2020.

Her first full-length album, Drug Opera, was released posthumously on August 20, 2021. The album includes features from Junglepussy, Kur, Tommy Playboy, and A$AP ANT.

=== Influences ===
Rogers was influenced and inspired by a variety of genres, and was exposed to hip-hop since her childhood. One of her more notable influences were emo-rock bands such as Fall Out Boy, Panic! at the Disco, and Paramore, as well as rock and metal bands such as Alesana or Meshuggah.

Rogers often explored the darker side of the human experience, diving into the depths of drug addiction, darkness, and pain.

She adhered to Buddhism as a philosophy and way of living, and believed in the power of crystals and transforming energies.

== Personal life ==
Rogers was in a relationship with New Jersey rapper Dash from H'z Global, from 2014 to 2016.

== Death ==
Rogers was found unresponsive on April 8, 2020, in her Philadelphia home. Her cause of death was later ruled an accidental drug overdose. Her death in the peak of her career gained attention from mainstream media.

== Discography ==
- Ninety (2016)
- music 2 die 2 (2017)
- I'm Not Here. This Isn't Happening. (2018)
- in case i die first (2019)
- Drug Opera (2021)
