= Imagineer Systems =

Visual effects software company

Imagineer Systems Limited
- Company type: Private
- Industry: Software; visual effects
- Founded: June 2000
- Founders: Allan Jaenicke; Philip McLauchlan
- Area served: Worldwide
- Key people: Allan Jaenicke; Philip McLauchlan
- Products: Mokey; Monet; Mocha; Imagineer System Planner
- Services: Visual effects software development; planar tracking; rotoscoping
- Owner: Boris FX (since 2014)
- Website: imagineersystems.com

Imagineer Systems Limited is a software company that specializes in the development and maintenance of several visual effects software applications. They are the "maker of the Academy Award-winning planar-tracking software Mocha".

The company was founded in June 2000 by Allan Jaenicke and Philip McLauchlan.

Applications produced by Imagineer have been widely adopted within the entertainment industry and can be seen in films such as X-Men: First Class, Alice in Wonderland, and Black Swan.

== History ==
Imagineer Systems was established in June 2000 by Allan Jaenicke and Philip McLauchlan. The pair had been carrying out a joint research project at the University of Surrey in Guildford, UK, with the aim of applying the latest computer vision research to methods of editing moving images. Upon finding the uses of this algorithm in removing wires and harnessing from stunt scenes, the duo decided to found the company. Mokey, their first commercial software, was released shortly after. Over the subsequent years, they would release the programs Monet and Mocha, the latter of which was adapted and included future versions of the editing software Adobe After Effects. In 2012, Imagineer received an Academy Award for Technical Achievement for its Imagineer System Planner, along with its tracking tools and rotoscoping software.

In 2014, Imagineer Systems came under the ownership of motion graphics and VFX development company Boris FX.
