= ASAP Mob =

American hip hop collective

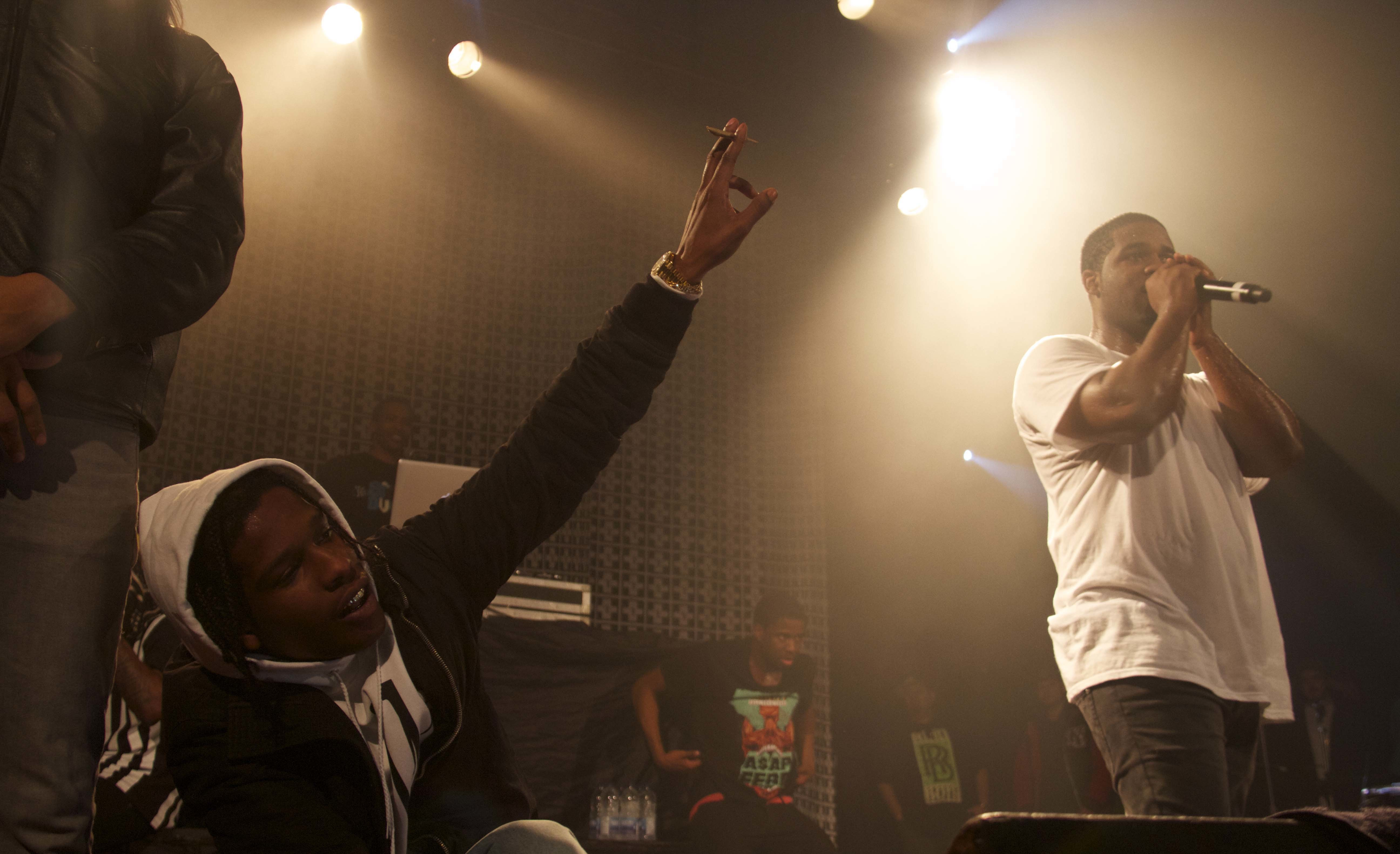
- ASAP Rocky and ASAP Ferg performing with ASAP Mob in 2013

Background information
- Origin: New York City, U.S.
- Genres: East Coast hip hop; trap; cloud rap
- Years active: 2006–2025
- Labels: ASAP Worldwide; AWGE; Polo Grounds; RCA
- Members: ASAP Ferg; ASAP Rocky; ASAP Twelvyy; ASAP Nast; ASAP TyY; ASAP Bari; ASAP Lou; ASAP ANT; ASAP Buddha; ASAP Illz; ASAP Joe; ASAP Lotto; Dash; Playboi Carti
- Past members: ASAP Relli; ASAP Ty Beats; ASAP Dom; ASAP AV; ASAP Killa K; ASAP Press; ASAP Snacks; ASAP Josh; ASAP Yams; Chynna

ASAP Mob (stylized as A$AP Mob) is an American hip-hop collective formed in 2006 in Harlem, New York City, that consists of rappers (most of whom carry the "ASAP" moniker, except Da$H and Playboi Carti), record producers, music video directors, and fashion designers.

In August 2012, the collective released the mixtape Lords Never Worry. They released the single "Trillmatic" in December 2013, followed by their debut studio album, Cozy Tapes Vol. 1: Friends, in October 2016 and second studio album Cozy Tapes Vol. 2: Too Cozy in August 2017.

== History ==
=== Formation and early beginnings (2006–2012) ===
In 2006, Steven Rodriguez, professionally known as ASAP Yams, formed the collective with fellow New Yorkers ASAP Bari and ASAP Illz. Harlem rapper ASAP Rocky joined later. The "ASAP" name was always understood as the familiar acronym for "as soon as possible", but it has also been explained as a backronym for other ideas including "Always Strive and Prosper", "Assassinating Snitches and Police", and "Acronym Symbolizing Any Purpose", and “As Dollar As Possible”, the latter reportedly the favorite of ASAP Rocky. In the summer of 2011, the group released music videos for Rocky's singles "Peso" and "Purple Swag", produced by ASAP Ty Beats. Rocky followed up with his mixtape Live.Love.ASAP in October, signing a record deal with Sony Music Entertainment that month.

=== Lords Never Worry (2012–2014) ===
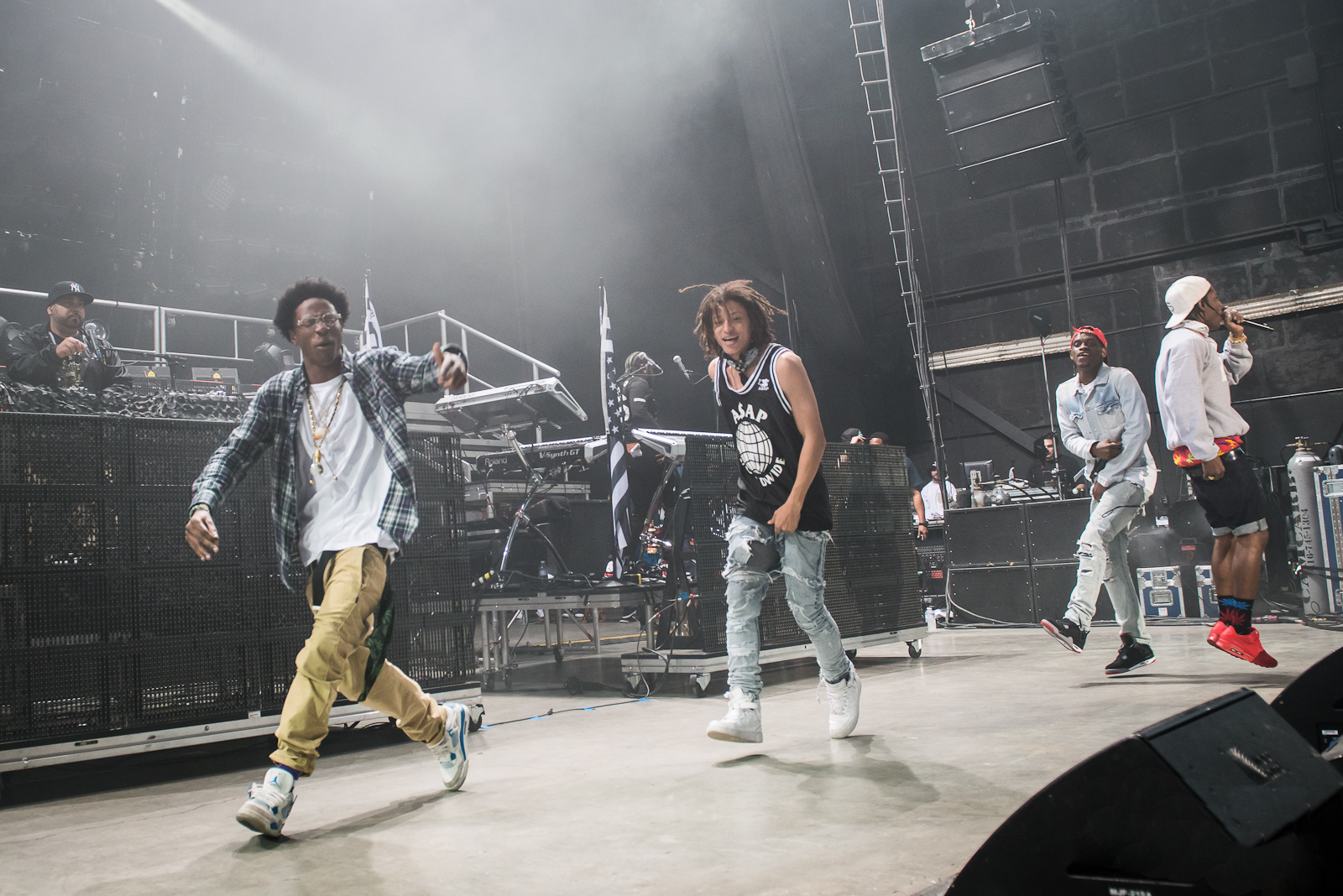
Members of ASAP Mob with Joey Badass (left) at the Under the Influence Tour in Toronto in August 2013

On August 27, 2012, ASAP Mob released their debut project, a mixtape titled Lords Never Worry, as a free download. From September to November, Rocky toured with opening acts Schoolboy Q, Danny Brown, and ASAP Mob in support of his solo debut album.

In January 2013, ASAP Ferg signed a joint venture deal with RCA and Polo Grounds, which released his single "Work" for retail on iTunes. An official remix of "Work", featuring Rocky, French Montana, Schoolboy Q, and Trinidad James followed.

Rocky's debut album Long. Live. ASAP, was released on January 15, 2013, debuting at number one on the Billboard 200 chart, with first-week sales of 139,000 copies in the United States.

ASAP Ferg announced that ASAP Mob would release their debut album after the release of his solo debut album Trap Lord, on August 20, 2013. The album peaked at number nine on the Billboard 200 and number four on the Top R&B/Hip-Hop Albums chart, with first-week sales of 32,000 copies in the United States. In November 2013, ASAP Rocky announced that the Mob's debut album would be titled Lords. On December 4, 2013, the album's first single, entitled "Trillmatic." The album title was then changed to L.O.R.D. On January 13, 2014, the single "See Me" by ASAP Ant was released.

On September 26, 2014, ASAP Yams revealed that L.O.R.D. had been shelved.

=== Cozy Tapes series (2015–2019) ===
On January 18, 2015, ASAP Mob revealed that ASAP Yams had died of acute mixed drug intoxication. On October 15, 2016, ASAP Rocky confirmed that the group's compilation album Cozy Tapes Vol. 1: Friends was completed. Dedicated to ASAP Yams, the album was released on October 31, 2016, and featured several artists, including Playboi Carti, who had signed to the Mob's AWGE imprint that year, Skepta, and Tyler, The Creator.

On August 1, 2017, ASAP Rocky announced that Cozy Tapes Vol. 2: Too Cozy would be released on August 25, preceded by ASAP Twelvyy's album, 12, on August 4 and ASAP Ferg's Still Striving on August 18.

On January 13, 2019, ASAP Ant announced that he was leaving the collective to focus on his solo career. He returned in April, confirming that the collective had begun work on their third studio album, Cozy Tapes 3.

== Deaths of ASAP members ==
- On January 18, 2015, ASAP Yams was found dead at the age of 26. The cause of death was ruled an overdose due to mixed drug intoxication, although ASAP Mob members and affiliates claimed that Yams had died of asphyxiating on vomit brought on by sleep apnea.
- On March 26, 2018, ASAP Press was shot and killed. The killers of ASAP Press were sentenced to 20 years in prison.
- On February 2, 2020, J. Scott, also known as ASAP Snacks, died.
- On April 8, 2020, Chynna was found dead of an accidental drug overdose. She was 25 years old.
- On October 16, 2021, ASAP Josh died.

== Alleged shooting of ASAP Relli by ASAP Rocky ==
On April 20, 2022, ASAP Rocky was arrested by LAPD officers at the Los Angeles International Airport for a shooting incident which took place five months beforehand in Hollywood on November 6, 2021; he was released on bond shortly after. It was reported that the person shot, who survived the incident, was ASAP Relli, whose real name is Terell Ephron. ASAP Rocky was found not guilty on February 18, 2025.

== Discography ==
=== Studio albums ===
List of albums, with selected chart positions
Title	Album details	Peak chart positions						Certifications
Title	Album details	US	US R&B /HH	US Rap	AUS	CAN	UK	Certifications
Cozy Tapes Vol. 1: Friends	Released: October 31, 2016; Label: ASAP Worldwide, Polo Grounds, RCA; Formats: CD, digital download	13	4	4	50	34	84	
Cozy Tapes Vol. 2: Too Cozy	Released: August 25, 2017; Label: ASAP Worldwide, Polo Grounds, RCA; Formats: CD, digital download	6	4	3	24	14	54	RIAA: Gold

=== Mixtapes ===
List of mixtapes, with year released
Title	Album details
Lords Never Worry	Released: August 28, 2012; Label: ASAP Worldwide, Polo Grounds, RCA; Formats: Digital download

=== Singles ===
List of singles, with selected chart positions, showing year released and album name
Title	Year	Peak chart positions						Certifications	Album
Title	Year	US Bub.	US R&B/HH Bub.	CAN	NZ Heat.	UK	UK R&B	Certifications	Album
"Bath Salts" (featuring ASAP Rocky, ASAP Ant and Flatbush Zombies)	2012	—	—	—	—	—	—		Lords Never Worry
"Trillmatic" (featuring ASAP Nast and Method Man)	2013	—	—	—	—	193	29		Non-album singles
"Xscape" (featuring ASAP Twelvyy)	2014	—	—	—	—	—	—		Non-album singles
"Hella Hoes" (featuring ASAP Rocky, ASAP Ferg, ASAP Nast and ASAP Twelvyy)	2014	—	10	—	—	—	—	RIAA: Gold	Non-album singles
"Yamborghini High" (featuring Juicy J)	2016	—	7	—	—	—	—	RIAA: Platinum; RMNZ: Gold	Cozy Tapes Vol. 1: Friends
"Crazy Brazy" (featuring ASAP Rocky, ASAP Twelvyy and KEY!)	2016	—	—	—	—	—	—	RIAA: Gold	Cozy Tapes Vol. 1: Friends
"Runner" (featuring ASAP Ant and Lil Uzi Vert)	2016	—	—	—	—	—	—		Cozy Tapes Vol. 1: Friends
"Telephone Calls" (featuring ASAP Rocky, Tyler, The Creator, Playboi Carti and Yung Gleesh)	2016	—	10	—	—	—	—	RIAA: Gold	Cozy Tapes Vol. 1: Friends
"Wrong" (featuring ASAP Rocky and ASAP Ferg)	2017	—	—	—	—	—	—		Non-album single
"Raf" (featuring ASAP Rocky, Playboi Carti, Quavo, Lil Uzi Vert and Frank Ocean)	2017	18	9	82	5	—	—	RIAA: Platinum; ARIA: Gold; RMNZ: Gold	Cozy Tapes Vol. 2: Too Cozy
"Feels So Good" (featuring ASAP Rocky, ASAP Ferg, ASAP Nast, ASAP Twelvyy and ASAP Ant)	2017	—	—	—	—	—	—		Cozy Tapes Vol. 2: Too Cozy
"—" denotes a recording that did not chart or was not released in that territory.

==== Other charted songs ====
List of singles, with selected chart positions, showing year released and album name
Title	Year	Peak chart positions						Certifications	Album
Title	Year	US Bub.	US R&B/HH Bub.	CAN	NZ Heat.	UK	UK R&B	Certifications	Album
"Frat Rules" (featuring ASAP Rocky, Playboi Carti and Big Sean)	2017	—	—	—	—	—	—	RIAA: Gold	Cozy Tapes Vol. 2: Too Cozy
"Walk on Water" (featuring ASAP Ferg, ASAP Nast, ASAP Twelvyy, ASAP Ant and Playboi Carti)	2017	—	—	—	—	—	—	RIAA: Gold	Cozy Tapes Vol. 2: Too Cozy
"—" denotes a recording that did not chart or was not released in that territory.

=== Music videos ===
List of music videos, showing year released and director
Title	Year	Director(s)
"Trillmatic" (featuring ASAP Nast and Method Man)	2013	Jonah Schwartz
"See Me" (featuring ASAP Ant)	2014	Andy Hines
"Xscape" (featuring ASAP Twelvyy)	2014	Simon Davis
"Hella Hoes" (featuring ASAP Rocky, ASAP Ferg, ASAP Nast, and ASAP Twelvyy)	2014	Jonah Schwartz
"Yamborghini High" (featuring Juicy J)	2016	Shomi Patwary, UnkleLuc, AWGE
"Wrong" (featuring ASAP Rocky and ASAP Ferg)	2017	Anton Bialat
"Raf" (featuring ASAP Rocky, Playboi Carti, Quavo, Lil Uzi Vert, Frank Ocean)	2017	Austin Winchell, ASAP Rocky
"Feels so Good" (featuring ASAP Rocky, ASAP Ferg, ASAP Nast, ASAP Twelvyy and ASAP Ant)	2017	Hidji Films
"Money Man" (featuring ASAP Rocky, ASAP Nast, and Skepta)	2018	Dexter Navy, ASAP Rocky
"Put That on My Set" (featuring ASAP Rocky and Skepta)	2018	Dexter Navy, ASAP Rocky

== Awards and nominations ==
=== BET Awards ===
Year	Nominee / work	Award	Result	R
2014	ASAP Mob	Best Group	Nominated	
2015	ASAP Mob	Best Group	Nominated	
