= ASAP Twelvyy =

American rapper (born 1989)

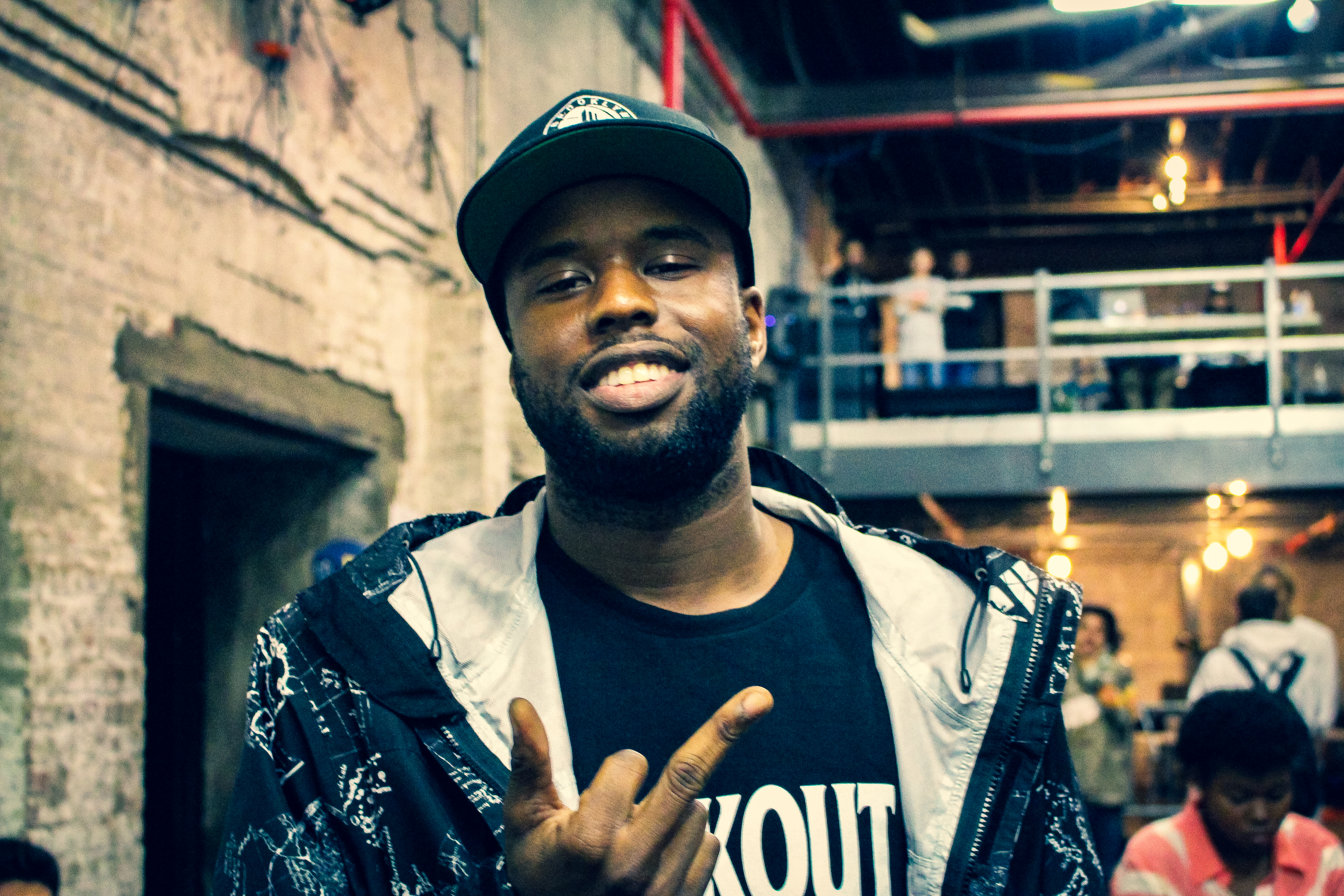
- ASAP Twelvyy in 2014

Background information
- Born: Jamel Da'Shawn Phillips; May 30, 1989 (age 36); Manhattan, New York City, U.S.
- Origin: The Bronx, New York City, U.S.
- Genres: East Coast hip hop
- Occupations: Rapper
- Years active: 2009–present
- Labels: ASAP Worldwide; Polo Grounds; RCA; Last Year Being Broke(n); Two Twelve Technologies
- Member of: ASAP Mob

Jamel Da'Shawn Phillips (born May 30, 1989), known professionally as ASAP Twelvyy (stylized as A$AP Twelvyy), is an American rapper from Harlem, New York City. He is a member of the hip hop group ASAP Mob, from which he adopted his moniker. In 2014, he released the song "Xscape", the second single to the ASAP Mob's debut album L.O.R.D. The album was supposed to be released in 2014, but it was officially scrapped. On August 4, 2017, ASAP Twelvyy released his debut album, titled 12.

== Early life ==
Jamel Phillips was born on May 30, 1989, in Harlem Hospital Center. He first lived at Convent Avenue and 129th street in Harlem, then Lenox Avenue and 127th street in Harlem, then moved to Castle Hill, Bronx in 2003. The name "Twelvyy" comes from his nickname "212". That was the area code in Harlem. "...I didn't want to be called "A$AP 212" because it don't flow right." says Philips. "A$AP Twelvyy is smooth and girls love Twelvy." Philips met ASAP Yams (co-founder of ASAP Mob) in 2006. He was introduced to fellow member ASAP Rocky by Yams at a house party in 2008. Philips was influenced by other New York artists such as Jay Z, Big L, Nas, Stack Bundles, 50 Cent and Big Pun.

== Career ==
=== 2011–15: Career beginnings with ASAP Mob ===
On September 19, 2011, ASAP Twelvyy was featured in ASAP Rocky's song "Trilla" with ASAP Nast. The song appeared on Rocky's debut mixtape Live. Love. ASAP (2011). That's when Twelvyy's name was first revealed to the people. Throughout 2012, Twevlyy started releasing his own material for the first time with songs such as "A.S.A.P. Bullshit", "12 Unleashed" and "Our World" featuring ASAP Nast. Twelvyy also appeared on the ASAP Mob's debut mixtape Lords Never Worry released on August 28, 2012. He appeared on the tracks "Full Metal Jacket", "Y.N.R.E.", "Jay Reed" and "Gotham City". On April 21, 2014, Twelvyy released the song "Xscape", which was the second single to the ASAP Mob's debut album, L.O.R.D. On June 5, 2014, he was featured in the third single to the album called "Hella Hoes" with ASAP Rocky, ASAP Ferg and ASAP Nast. Later that year ASAP Yams announced that the album was going to be scrapped.

On August 29, 2014, ASAP Twelvyy released the song, "Glock Rivers". On November 20, 2014, the official music video for "Glock Rivers" was released. The video revealed that Twelvyy would soon be releasing his debut mixtape. On April 15, 2015, he released the song, "LORD". Sources said this song would not appear on his mixtape. On August 24, 2015, Twelvyy released his next single, "Heaven Can Wait" featuring Emilz.

=== 2016–2019: 12 ===
In 2016, Twelvyy went on tour with the Flatbush Zombies during the 3001: A Laced Odyssey Tour, along with fellow New York Rapper Remy Banks of World's Fair.

On January 1, 2016, he released another single called, "L.Y.B.B. (Resolution)". On January 29, 2016, he releases a song called "Trips" in anticipation for his tour with Flatbush Zombies. On January 31, 2016, Twelvyy released a freestyle of ASAP Rocky's "1 Train", which appeared on Rocky's debut album Long. Live. ASAP (2013).

On February 18, 2016, ASAP Twelvyy released the single, "Lords Never Worry" featuring ASAP Rocky and ASAP Nast. The song is a part of the #WavyWednesdays series. On March 9, 2016, Twelvyy released another song for the series called "Again" which features ASAP Ant. On March 29, 2016, ASAP Twelvyy revealed he was releasing a mixtape called 2127301090. On Instagram, he posted a picture of the album cover that says "coming soon" in the middle. On March 30, 2016, Twelvyy released another song with Rocky and Nast called "Presidents", which is also included in the #WavyWednesdays series. On August 31, 2016, ASAP Twelvyy released Motivation featuring Da$h and AZ.

On August 4, 2017, ASAP Twelvyy finally released his debut album, titled 12.

=== 2020–Present: Noon Yung ===
On February 11, Twelvyy released debut single "Gunpla" for his next mixtape "Before Noon".

== Discography ==
=== Albums ===
List of albums, with selected album details
Title	Album details
12	Released: August 4, 2017; Labels: ASAP Worldwide, Polo Grounds, RCA; Formats: Digital download, streaming
Noon Yung	Released: October 30, 2020; Label: Last Year Being Broke(n); Formats: Digital download, streaming
Kid$ Gotta Eat	Released: July 7, 2023; Label: Two Twelve Technologies; Formats: Digital download, streaming
I Did More With Less (V1)	Released: February 12, 2025; Label: Two Twelve Technologies; Formats: Digital download, streaming

=== Extended plays ===
List of albums, with selected album details
Title	Album details
A Quarter Til	Released: February 12, 2022; Label: Two Twelve Technologies; Formats: Digital download, streaming

=== Mixtapes ===
List of mixtapes, with selected album details
Title	Album details
Lords Never Worry (with ASAP Mob)	Released: August 28, 2012; Label: ASAP Worldwide, Yamborghini; Formats: Digital download
Before Noon	Released: April 10, 2020; Label: Last Year Being Broke(n); Formats: Digital download, streaming

=== Singles ===
==== As lead artist ====
List of non-album singles, showing year released
Title	Year
"Glock Rivers"	2014
"LORD"	2015
"Heaven Can Wait" (featuring Emilz)	2015
"L.Y.B.B. (Resolution)"	2016
"Trips"	2016
"Lords Never Worry" (featuring ASAP Rocky and ASAP Nast)	2016
"Again" (featuring ASAP Ant)	2016
"Presidents" (with ASAP Rocky and ASAP Nast)	2016
"Motivation" (featuring Da$h and AZ)	2016

==== As featured artist ====
List of singles, with selected chart positions and certifications, showing year released and album name
Title	Year	Peak chart positions	Album
Title	Year	US R&B	Album
"Free Crack" (Chynna featuring ASAP Ant and ASAP Twelvyy)	2014	—	The Big Payback
"Xscape" (ASAP Mob featuring ASAP Twelvyy)	2014	—	non-album singles
"Hella Hoes" (ASAP Mob featuring ASAP Rocky, ASAP Ferg, ASAP Nast and ASAP Twelvyy)	2014	60	non-album singles
"Half - Time" (Flatbush Zombies featuring ASAP Twelvyy)	2015	—	non-album singles
"Who You Wit" (Tray Pizzy featuring ASAP Twelvyy)	2016	—	non-album singles
"Leather Symphony" (Flatbush Zombies featuring ASAP Twelvyy)	2018	9	Vacation in Hell
"—" denotes a recording that did not chart or was not released in that territory.

=== Guest appearances ===
List of non-single guest appearances, with other performing artists, showing year released and album name
Title	Year	Other artist(s)	Album
"Trilla"	2011	ASAP Rocky, ASAP Nast	Live. Love. ASAP
"Bastermating"	2011	Asher Roth, King Chip, YP	Pabst & Jazz
"4 Loko" (remix)	2011	Smoke DZA, ASAP Rocky, Danny Brown, Killa Kyleon, Freeway	Sweet Baby Kushed Good
"Game 7"	2012	Smoke DZA	Rugby Thompson
"Out Here"	2012	Smoke DZA, Vado	K.O.N.Y.
"Aura"	2013	Harry Fraud, Smoke DZA	Adrift
"Silver Lining"	2016	Statik Selektah, Chauncy Sherod, Kirk Knight	Lucky 7
"Scorpion Death Drop"	2016	The Sparks Foundation, Project Pat, Smoke DZA, Trae The Truth	Parts Unknown
"Dark Knight"	2024	Maglera Doe Boy, ONDELIVE	MAGLERA TAPES
