= ASAP Ferg discography =

Hip hop recording artist discography

Ferg discography
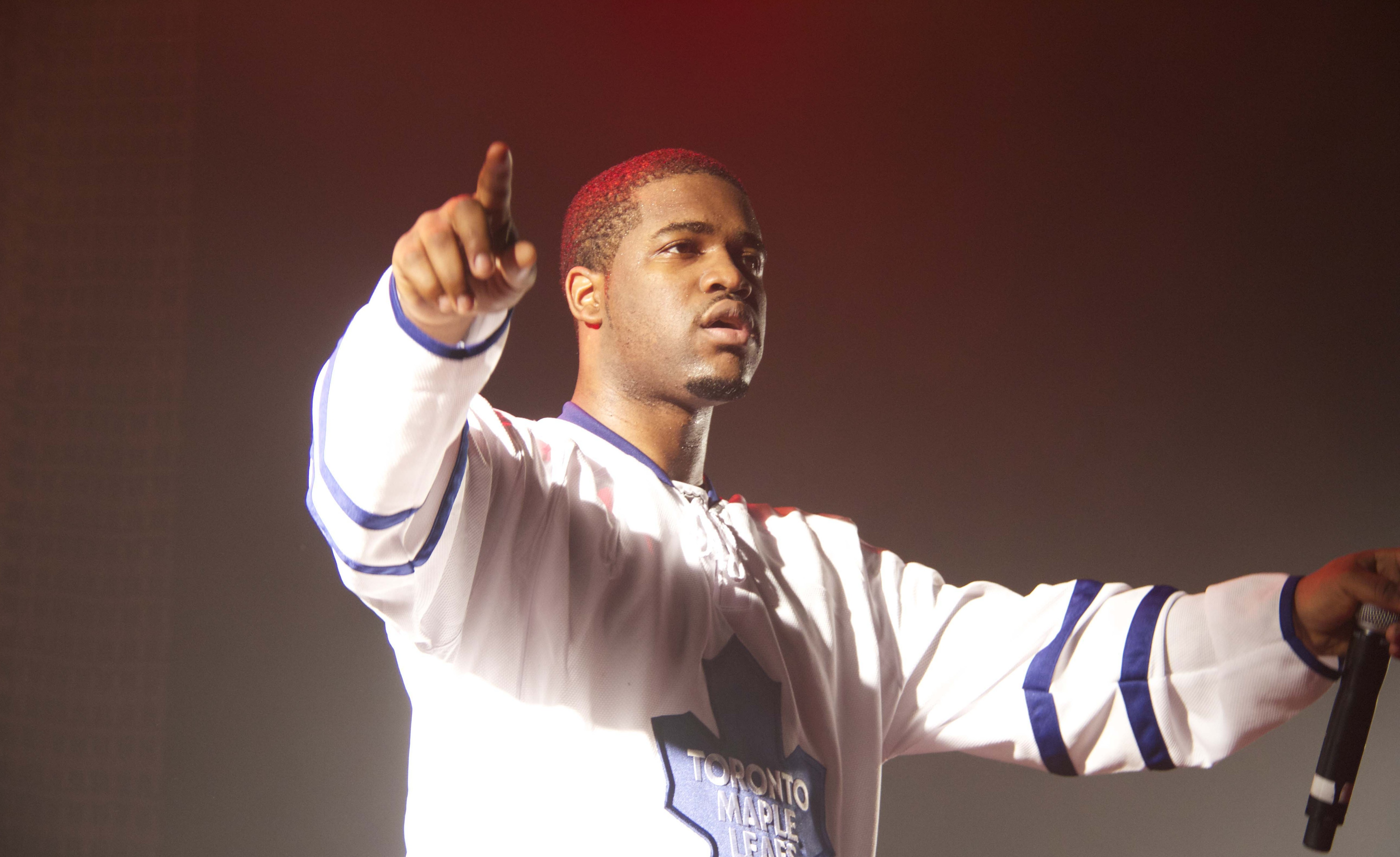
- Ferg performing in 2013
- Studio albums: 3
- EPs: 1
- Singles: 48
- Mixtapes: 5

American rapper Ferg, formerly known as A$AP Ferg(/ˈeɪsæp/ AY-sap; stylized as A$AP Ferg) has released three studio albums, 5 mixtapes, one extended play and forty eight singles (including twenty three as a featured artist and six promotional singles).

== Studio albums ==
List of studio albums, with selected chart positions
Title	Details	Peak chart positions										Certifications
Title	Details	US	US R&B/HH	US Rap	AUS	BEL (FL)	CAN	FRA	NOR	NZ	UK	Certifications
Trap Lord	Released: August 20, 2013; Label: A$AP Worldwide, Polo Grounds, RCA; Formats: CD, LP, digital download	9	4	2	—	—	—	—	—	—	85	RIAA: Gold; MC: Gold
Always Strive and Prosper	Released: April 22, 2016; Label: A$AP Worldwide, Polo Grounds, RCA; Formats: CD, LP, digital download	8	2	2	16	102	11	142	34	35	67	
Darold	Released: November 8, 2024; Label: RCA; Formats: LP, digital download	—	—	—	—	—	—	—	—	—	—	

== EPs ==
List of extended plays, with selected chart positions
Title	Details	Peak chart positions									
Title	Details	US	US R&B/HH	US Rap	AUS	BEL (FL)	CAN	FRA	NLD	NOR	NZ
Floor Seats	Released: August 16, 2019; Label: A$AP Worldwide, Polo Grounds, RCA; Formats: Streaming, digital download	50	28	25	70	146	38	165	98	28	35

== Mixtapes ==
List of mixtapes, with year released
Title	Details	Peak chart positions									Certifications
Title	Details	US	US R&B/HH	US Rap	AUS	BEL (FL)	CAN	FRA	NLD	NZ	Certifications
Ferg Forever	Released: November 28, 2014; Label: A$AP Worldwide; Format: Digital download	—	—	—	—	—	—	—	—	—	
Still Striving	Released: August 18, 2017; Label: A$AP Worldwide, RCA; Format: Digital download	12	7	5	35	94	13	114	64	32	RIAA: Gold
Floor Seats II	Released: September 25, 2020; Label: A$AP Worldwide, Polo Grounds, RCA; Format: Digital download, streaming	143	—	—	—	—	—	—	—	—	
Flip Phone Shorty - Strictly for da Streetz Vol. 1	Released: November 28, 2025; Label: Trillagan Island; Format: Digital download, streaming	—	—	—	—	—	—	—	—	—	
Strictly 4 the Scythe (with The Scythe)	Released: March 6, 2026; Label: Loma Vista; Format: Digital download, streaming, LP, cassette, CD	—	—	—	91	—	—	—	—	—	

== Singles ==
=== As lead artist ===
List of singles, with selected chart positions and certifications, showing year released and album name
Title	Year	Peak chart positions							Certifications	Album
Title	Year	US	US R&B/HH	US Rap	AUS	CAN	NZ	UK	Certifications	Album
"Work"	2013	100	30	23	—	—	—	—	RIAA: 2× Platinum; MC: Platinum; ARIA: Platinum; RMNZ: Platinum	Trap Lord
"Shabba" (featuring A$AP Rocky)	2013	— (Note: "Shabba" did not enter the Billboard Hot 100, but peaked at number 7 on the Bubbling Under Hot 100 Singles chart, which acts as a 25-song extension to the Hot 100.)	34	—	—	—	—	—	RIAA: 2× Platinum; MC: Platinum; ARIA: Gold; RMNZ: Platinum	Trap Lord
"Hood Pope"	2013	—	—	—	—	—	—	—		Trap Lord
"Old English" (with Young Thug and Freddie Gibbs)	2014	—	—	—	—	—	—	—	RIAA: Gold	Mass Appeal Vol. 1
"Doe-Active"	2014	—	—	—	—	—	—	—		Ferg Forever
"New Level" (featuring Future)	2015	90	30	17	—	—	—	—	RIAA: 2× Platinum; MC: Platinum; RMNZ: Gold	Always Strive and Prosper
"Back Hurt" (featuring Migos)	2016	—	—	—	—	—	—	—		Always Strive and Prosper
"East Coast" (featuring Remy Ma)	2017	—	—	—	—	—	—	—		Non-album single
"Plain Jane" (solo or featuring Nicki Minaj)	2017	26	13	12	79	30	38	79	RIAA: 6× Platinum; ARIA: 3× Platinum; BPI: Platinum; MC: 5× Platinum; RMNZ: 4× Platinum	Still Striving
"Harlem Anthem"	2018	—	—	—	—	—	—	—		The Uncle Drew Motion Picture Soundtrack
"Redlight" (with Nghtmre)	2019	—	—	—	—	—	—	—		Non-album single
"Pups" (featuring A$AP Rocky)	2019	—	—	—	—	—	— (Note: "Pups" did not enter the NZ Top 40 Singles Chart, but peaked at number 21 on the NZ Hot Singles Chart.)	—		Floor Seats
"Wam" (featuring MadeinTYO)	2019	—	—	—	—	—	— (Note: "Wam" did not enter the NZ Top 40 Singles Chart, but peaked at number 27 on the NZ Hot Singles Chart.)	—		Floor Seats
"Floor Seats"	2019	—	—	—	—	—	— (Note: "Floor Seats" did not enter the NZ Top 40 Singles Chart, but peaked at number 24 on the NZ Hot Singles Chart.)	—		Floor Seats
"Value"	2020	—	—	—	—	—	— (Note: "Value" did not enter the NZ Top 40 Singles Chart, but peaked at number 26 on the NZ Hot Singles Chart.)	—		Floor Seats II
"Move Ya Hips" (featuring Nicki Minaj and MadeinTYO)	2020	19	8	6	—	73	— (Note: "Move Ya Hips" did not enter the NZ Top 40 Singles Chart, but peaked at number 6 on the NZ Hot Singles Chart.)	—		Floor Seats II
"No Ceilings" (featuring Jay Gwuapo and Lil Wayne)	2020	—	—	—	—	—	—	—		Floor Seats II
"Dennis Rodman" (featuring Tyga)	2020	—	—	—	—	—	—	—		Floor Seats II
"Green Juice" (featuring Pharrell and The Neptunes)	2021	—	—	—	—	—	—	—		Non-album singles
"MDMX"	2024	—	—	—	—	—	—	—		Darold
"Allure" (featuring Future and Mike Will Made It)	2024	—	—	—	—	—	— (Note: "Allure" did not enter the NZ Top 40 Singles Chart, but peaked at number 23 on the NZ Hot Singles Chart.)	—		Darold
"—" denotes a recording that did not chart or was not released.

=== As featured artist ===
List of singles, with selected chart positions and certifications, showing year released and album name
Title	Year	Peak chart positions			Certifications	Album
Title	Year	US	US R&B/HH	US Rap	Certifications	Album
"Lotta That" (G-Eazy featuring A$AP Ferg and Danny Seth)	2014	— (Note: "Lotta That" did not enter the Billboard Hot 100, but peaked at number 14 on the Bubbling Under Hot 100 Singles chart, which acts as a 25-song extension to the Hot 100.)	32	21	RIAA: Platinum	These Things Happen
"Hella Hoes" (A$AP Mob featuring A$AP Rocky, A$AP Nast, A$AP Ferg, and A$AP Twelvyy)	2014	—	— (Note: "Hella Hoes" did not enter the Billboard Hot R&B/Hip-Hop Songs chart, but peaked at number 10 on the Bubbling Under R&B/Hip-Hop Singles chart.)	—	RIAA: Gold	Non-album singles
"Beautiful (DHNY Remix)" (Mali Music featuring A$AP Ferg)	2014	—	—	—		Non-album singles
"Don't Wanna Dance" (Elle Varner featuring A$AP Ferg)	2014	—	—	—		4 Letter Word
"My Song 5" (Haim featuring A$AP Ferg)	2014	—	—	—		Days Are Gone
"Fiesta (Remix)" (Sicko Mobb featuring A$AP Ferg)	2014	—	—	—		Non-album singles
"Villain" (Liam Bailey featuring A$AP Ferg)	2014	—	—	—		Non-album singles
"Whiteline" (Crystal Caines featuring A$AP Ferg)	2014	—	—	—		Non-album singles
"B Boy" (Meek Mill featuring Big Sean and A$AP Ferg)	2015	— (Note: "B Boy" did not enter the Billboard Hot 100, but peaked at number 7 on the Bubbling Under Hot 100 Singles chart, which acts as a 25-song extension to the Hot 100.)	39	—		Non-album singles
"Fuck Yo DJ" (Overdoz featuring A$AP Ferg)	2015	—	—	—		Non-album singles
"Slime Season" (N.O.R.E. featuring Big Tune and A$AP Ferg)	2015	—	—	—		Non-album singles
"WDYW" (Carnage featuring Lil Uzi Vert, ASAP Ferg, and Rich the Kid)	2015	—	—	—	RIAA: Gold	Papi Gordo
"That Damaged Girl" (SEVDALIZA featuring A$AP Ferg)	2016	—	—	—		Non-album single
"Look at Us Now" (Lost Kings featuring Ally Brooke and A$AP Ferg)	2017	—	—	—		We Are Lost Kings (Japan EP)
"Our Streets" (DJ Premier featuring A$AP Ferg)	2017	—	—	—		Non-album single
"Fake Chanel" (Yellow Claw featuring A$AP Ferg and Creek Boyz)	2018	—	—	—		New Blood
"King" (Nasty C featuring A$AP Ferg)	2018	—	—	—		Strings And Bling
"Ned Flanders" (MadeinTYO featuring A$AP Ferg)	2018	—	—	—	RIAA: Gold	Sincerely, Tokyo
"Lit" (Octavian featuring A$AP Ferg)	2019	—	—	—		Endorphins
"Chase the Money" (E-40 featuring Quavo, Roddy Ricch, A$AP Ferg, and ScHoolboy Q)	2019	—	—	—	RIAA: Gold	Practice Makes Paper
"Bezerk" (Big Sean featuring A$AP Ferg and Hit-Boy)	2019	89	39	—	RIAA: Gold	Non-album single
"Say It Again" (Onefour featuring A$AP Ferg)	2020	—	—	—	ARIA: Platinum	Against All Odds
"Guilty" (Sevyn Streeter featuring Chris Brown and A$AP Ferg)	2021	—	—	—		Drunken Wordz x Sober Thoughtz
"Silver Tooth" (Armani White featuring Ferg)	2023	—	—	—		Road to CasaBlanco
"Just Do It" (Jaylen Brown featuring Ferg)	2024	—	—	—		Non-album single
"—" denotes a recording that did not chart or was not released in that territory.

=== Promotional singles ===
List of promotional singles, with selected chart positions and certifications, showing year released and album name
Title	Year	Peak chart positions	Certifications	Album
Title	Year	US R&B/HH	Certifications	Album
"Work" (Remix) (featuring A$AP Rocky, French Montana, Trinidad James and Schoolboy Q)	2013	—	RIAA: 3× Platinum	Trap Lord
"Shabba" (Remix) (featuring Shabba Ranks, Migos and Busta Rhymes)	2013	—		Non-album single
"Let It Bang" (featuring Schoolboy Q)	2016	— (Note: "Let It Bang" did not enter the Billboard Hot R&B/Hip-Hop Songs chart, but peaked at number one on the Bubbling Under R&B/Hip-Hop Singles chart.)		Always Strive and Prosper
"World Is Mine" (featuring Big Sean)	2016	—		Always Strive and Prosper
"Hungry Ham" (featuring Skrillex and Crystal Caines)	2016	—		Always Strive and Prosper
"Strive" (featuring Missy Elliott)	2016	—		Always Strive and Prosper
"New Level" (Remix) (featuring Future, A$AP Rocky and Lil Uzi Vert)	2016	—		Non-album single
"East Coast" (Remix) (featuring Busta Rhymes, A$AP Rocky, Dave East, French Montana, Rick Ross and Snoop Dogg)	2017	—		Still Striving
"Nasty (Who Dat)" (featuring Migos)	2017	—		Still Striving
"Kristi YamaGucci" (featuring Denzel Curry, IDK and Nicknack)	2018	—		Non-album singles
"Not the Boy"	2019	—		Non-album singles
"Verified"	2019	—		Non-album singles

== Other charted and certified songs ==
List of songs, with selected chart positions, showing year released and album name
Title	Year	Peak chart positions			Certifications	Album
Title	Year	US	US R&B/HH	NZ Hot	Certifications	Album
"Ghetto Symphony" (ASAP Rocky featuring Gunplay and ASAP Ferg)	2013	—	— (Note: "Ghetto Symphony" did not enter the Billboard Hot R&B/Hip-Hop Songs chart, but peaked at number two on the Bubbling Under R&B/Hip-Hop Singles chart.)	—	RIAA: Gold	Long. Live. ASAP
"Bossin' Up" (Kid Ink featuring ASAP Ferg and French Montana)	2013	—	—	—	RMNZ: Gold	Almost Home
"Walk on Water" (ASAP Mob featuring ASAP Twelvyy, ASAP Ant, ASAP Nast, ASAP Ferg & Playboi Carti)	2019	—	—	—		Cozy Tapes Vol. 2: Too Cozy
"Jet Lag"	2019	—	—	19		Floor Seats
"Dreams, Fairytales, Fantasies" (featuring Salaam Remi and Brent Faiyaz)	2019	—	—	—	RIAA: Platinum; BPI: Gold; RMNZ: 2× Platinum	Floor Seats
"Spicy" (Nas featuring Fivio Foreign and ASAP Ferg)	2020	96	36	—		King's Disease
"Me (FMW)" (Meek Mill featuring ASAP Ferg)	2021	89	38	—		Expensive Pain
"—" denotes a recording that did not chart.

== Guest appearances ==
List of non-single guest appearances, with other performing artists, showing year released and album name
Title	Year	Other artist(s)	Album
"Get High"	2010	ASAP Rocky	Deep Purple
"Kissin' Pink"	2011	ASAP Rocky	Live. Love. ASAP
"Harlem to Texas"	2012	OG Chess	—N/a
"Home"	2012	OG Chess	—N/a
"love2K"	2013	Kilo Kish	K+
"Max Julien"	2013	Funkmaster Flex, ASAP Rocky	Who You Mad At? Me or Yourself?
"Trap Lords"	2013	Funkmaster Flex, Bodega Bamz	Who You Mad At? Me or Yourself?
"Take It Easy"	2013	Peter Rosenberg, ASAP Rocky	New York Renaissance
"Uptown"	2013	Travis Scott	Owl Pharaoh
"Say Amen"	2013	Bodega Bamz	Strictly 4 My P.A.P.I.Z.
"Bossin Up"	2013	Kid Ink, French Montana	Almost Home
"Click Clack"	2013	YG	Mr. Sold Out Pt. 25
"So Cold"	2013	Dash, ASAP Nast	V.I.C.E.S
"Smoke Signals"	2013	Audubon	Hotel Audubon
"More Champagne"	2013	DJ Whoo Kid, Wiz Khalifa, Problem	—N/a
"Lullaby"	2014	Aston Matthews	Aston 3:16
"Lac Lac"	2014	Big K.R.I.T.	Cadillactica
"We Don't Fuckin Care"	2014	Onyx	Wakedafucup
"Hands on Me"	2014	Ariana Grande	My Everything
"Ice"	2014	Juicy J, Future	—N/a
"Truck on D Road (Remix)"	2014	Bunji Garlin	Differentology
"Gimme That"	2015	Troy Ave, Young Lito	Major Without A Deal
"It G Ma (Remix)"	2015	Keith Ape	—N/a
"20's 50's 100's"	2015	King Avriel	Welcome to Los Santos
"American Beauty / American Psycho (Remix)"	2015	Fall Out Boy	Make America Psycho Again
"Blase (Remix)"	2015	Ty Dolla Sign, T.I., French Montana	—N/a
"Touchdown Plaxico"	2016	Rowdy Rebel	Shmoney Keeps Calling
"Finesse"	2016	Jim Jones, Desiigner, Rich Homie Quan	The Kitchen
"Get Ghost"	2016	Mark Ronson, Passion Pit	Ghostbusters
"Complex City Cypher"	2016	Christian Scott, Wiki, Your Old Droog	—N/a
"No Limit (G-Mix)"	2016	Usher, Gucci Mane, Master P, 2 Chainz, Travis Scott	—N/a
"Crystal City"	2016	Yung Lean	Frost God
"Pull Up"	2018	Powers Pleasant, Joey Bada$$	—N/a
"Pray"	2018	Smokepurpp	Bless Yo Trap
"Black"	2018	Buddy	Harlan & Alondra
"Sack"	2018	B-Real, Jazz Lazer	the Prescription
"Boca Raton"	2018	Bas	Milky Way
"Westbrook"	2018	JID	DiCaprio 2
"Runnin"	2018	Mike Will Made It, Nicki Minaj, ASAP Rocky	Creed II: The Album
"On God"	2019	Mustard, YG, ASAP Rocky, Tyga	Perfect Ten
"Murda Blocc"	2019	Maxo Kream	Brandon Banks
"Champagne Wishes"	2019	Max B	House Money
"Mazel Tov"	2020	IDK	Friends 2 (Basketball County Soundtrack)
"Spicy"	2020	Nas, Fivio Foreign	King's Disease
"Bankroll"	2021	Brockhampton, ASAP Rocky	Roadrunner: New Light, New Machine
"Perfect (Remix)"	2021	Logic, Lil Wayne	—N/a
"Me (FMW)"	2021	Meek Mill	Expensive Pain
"Lifestyle"	2022	Bas	D-Day: A Gangsta Grillz Mixtape
"Paper Plates"	2022	Nigo, Pharrell Williams	I Know Nigo!
"Practice"	2022	Anitta, Harv	Versions of Me
"Or Not"	2022	Kent Jamz	Fanclub
"Yams Day"	2023	A$AP Twelvvy, A$AP Rocky	Kid$ Gotta Eat da Deluxe
"U-Turn"	2023	Bas, Blckie	We Only Talk About Real Shit When We're Fucked Up
"Admit It"	2024	Neek Bucks	Unique
"Shmoke"	2024	Powers Pleasant, Armani Caesar	Life Sucks
"Hot One"	2024	Denzel Curry and TiaCorine	King of the Mischievous South Vol. 2
"I Got Plans"	2024	Mary J. Blige	Gratitude
"Rock Out"	2024	Trae tha Truth	Crowd Control

== Music videos ==
Year	Title	Director	Artist(s)
As main performer
2013	"Work" (Remix)		featuring French Montana, Trinidad James, ScHoolboy Q and A$AP Rocky
2013	"Shabba"	Andy Hines	featuring A$AP Rocky
2016	"New Level"		featuring Future
2016	"Let It Bang"		featuring ScHoolboy Q
2016	"Yammy Gang"	Jathan	featuring A$AP Mob and Tatiana Paulino
2016	"World Is Mine"		featuring Big Sean
2016	"Back Hurt"		featuring Migos
2021	"Green Juice"	Valentin Petit	featuring Pharrell
2024	"Thought I Was Dead"		
As featured performer
2015	"B Boy"	Spike Jordan	Meek Mill featuring Big Sean and A$AP Ferg
2016	"Big Timers"	A$AP Ferg	Marty Baller featuring A$AP Ferg
2017	"Hop Out"		A$AP Twelvyy featuring A$AP Ferg
2017	"Our Streets"		DJ Premier featuring A$AP Ferg
2018	"Black"		Buddy featuring Ferg
2018	King		Nasty C featuring A$AP Ferg
2018	"Ned Flanders"	Lonewolf	MADEINTYO featuring Ferg
2019	"RedLight"		NGHTMRE & ASAP Ferg
2019	"Bezerk"		Big Sean featuring Ferg & Hit-Boy
2020	"Spicy"	Jack Begert	Nas featuring Fivio Foreign & Ferg
2020	Mazel Tov	IDK	IDK featuring Ferg
2020	"Say It Again"	Sondr Films	ONEFOUR featuring Ferg
2023	"Guilty"	Young Chang	Sevyn Streeter featuring Ferg & C Breezy
2023	"Silver Tooth"	Mikey D’Amico & Davey Robinson	Armani White featuring Ferg
2024	"U-Turn"	iloobia and Ryan Doubiago	Bas featuring Ferg & Blxckie
2024	"Rock Out"		Trae the Truth featuring Ferg
2024	"Hot One"	Ramon Castellanos	Denzel Curry featuring Ferg
2024	"Just Do It"	Jamar Harding	Jaylen Brown x Ferg
2024	"Shmoke"	Pietro Biz Biasia	Powers Pleasant featuring ASAP Ferg & Armani Caesar
	Cameo appearances		
2013	"Fashion Killa"		A$AP Rocky
2014	"Jealous (I Ain't with It)"		Chromeo

== See also ==
- ASAP Mob discography
