= Always Strive and Prosper =

2016 album by ASAP Ferg

Studio album by ASAP Ferg
- Released: April 22, 2016
- Recorded: 2015–16
- Genre: Hip hop
- Length: 47:28
- Labels: A$AP; Polo Grounds; RCA
- Producers: ASAP Ferg; Burd & Keyz; Cashmere Cat; Clams Casino; Danny Wolf; DJ Khalil; DJ Mustard; Foreign Teck; Hagler; Honorable C.N.O.T.E.; Jordan Lewis; Lido; Lex Luger; No I.D.; Skrillex; Soldado; StarGate; Stelios Phili; TM88; Todd Bee; VERYRVRE

ASAP Ferg chronology
Ferg Forever (2014)	Always Strive and Prosper (2016)	Still Striving (2017)

Singles from Always Strive And Prosper
- 1. "New Level" Released: December 18, 2015; 2. "Back Hurt" Released: June 28, 2016

Always Strive and Prosper is the second studio album by American rapper ASAP Ferg. It was released on April 22, 2016, by A$AP Worldwide, Polo Grounds Music and RCA Records. The album was supported by two singles: "New Level" featuring Future, and "Back Hurt" featuring Migos. Other appearances include Missy Elliott, A$AP Mob, Chris Brown, Ty Dolla $ign, Rick Ross and Schoolboy Q, among others.

== Singles ==
On December 18, 2015, ASAP Ferg released the album's first single, titled "New Level". The song features a guest appearance from Southern hip hop recording artist Future, with the production that was handled by Honorable C.N.O.T.E. On January 19, 2016, the music video was released for "New Level" featuring Future.

On June 28, 2016, the bonus track "Back Hurt" featuring Migos, was sent to urban radio as the album's second single. The following day, the music video was released.

=== Promotional singles ===
"Let It Bang" featuring Schoolboy Q, was released as the album's promotional single on March 24, 2016. The following day, the music video premiered for "Let It Bang" featuring Schoolboy Q. "World Is Mine" featuring Big Sean was released as the album's second promotional single on April 1, 2016. The official video for the song was released on June 26, 2016. The audio for "Hungry Ham" featuring Skrillex and Crystal Caines, was released as the album's third promotional single on April 7, 2016. The audio for "Strive" featuring Missy Elliott, was released as the album's fourth promotional single on April 14, 2016.

== Critical reception ==
Professional ratings
Aggregate scores
Source	Rating
Metacritic	74/100
Review scores
Source	Rating
AllMusic	4/5 stars
The A.V. Club	B+
Consequence of Sound	C
Exclaim	8/10
The Guardian	4/5 stars
NME	3/5
Pitchfork Media	7.3/10
Rolling Stone	3.5/5 stars
Spin	5/10
XXL	(XL)

Always Strive And Prosper has received generally positive reviews. At Metacritic which assigns a normalized rating out of 100 to reviews from critics, the album received a score of 74 based on 15 reviews, which indicates "generally favorable reviews".

== Commercial performance ==
In the United States, the album debuted at number 8 on the Billboard 200, selling 35,000 units in its first week.

== Track listing ==
No.	Title	Writer(s)	Producer(s)	Length
1.	"Rebirth"	Darold Brown; Sam Barsh; Khalil Abdul-Rahman; Michael Volpe; Daniel Tannenbaum; Daniel Seeff	DJ Khalil; Clams Casino	2:15
2.	"Hungry Ham" (featuring Skrillex and Crystal Caines)	Brown; Sonny Moore; Crystal Caines	Skrillex	3:35
3.	"Strive" (featuring Missy Elliott)	Brown; Dijon McFarlane; Stelios Phili; Melissa Elliott; Kevin McCord	DJ Mustard; Phili	2:50
4.	"Meet My Crazy Uncle (Skit)"	Brown	Todd Bee	0:22
5.	"Psycho"	Brown; Barsh; Abdul-Rahman; Volpe; Tannenbaum; Seeff	DJ Khalil; Clams Casino	2:58
6.	"Let It Bang" (featuring Schoolboy Q)	Brown; Lexus Lewis; Quincey Hanley	Lex Luger	2:31
7.	"New Level" (featuring Future)	Brown; Carlton Mays, Jr.; Nayvadius Wilburn	Honorable C.N.O.T.E.	4:24
8.	"Yammy Gang" (featuring ASAP Mob and Tatianna Paulino)	Brown; Magnus Høiberg; Peder Losnegård; Rakim Mayers; Jamal Phillips; Tariq Devega; Tatianna Paulino	Cashmere Cat; Lido	2:33
9.	"Swipe Life" (featuring Rick Ross)	Brown; Jeff Washington; Tashfiqur Patwary; Chris Basham; William Roberts II	VERYRVRE	3:13
10.	"Uzi Gang" (featuring Lil Uzi Vert and Marty Baller)	Brown; Bryan Simmons; Symere Woods; Milton Martin III	TM88	3:32
11.	"Beautiful People" (featuring Chuck D and Mama Ferg)	Brown; Barsh; Abdul-Rahman; Volpe; Carlton Ridenhour; Marvin Gay Jr.; James Nyx	DJ Khalil; Clams Casino	3:15
12.	"Damn Not Again (Skit)"	Brown	Todd Bee	0:21
13.	"Let You Go"	Brown; Mikkel Eriksen; Tor Hermansen	StarGate	3:16
14.	"World Is Mine" (featuring Big Sean)	Brown; Ernest Wilson; Sean Anderson	No I.D.	3:45
15.	"Phone Call With Breezy (Skit)"	Brown	Todd Bee	0:41
16.	"I Love You" (featuring Chris Brown and Ty Dolla Sign)	Brown; Marvin Thomas; Jordan Lewis; Christopher Brown; Tyrone Griffin, Jr.	Hagler; Jordan Lewis	3:47
17.	"Grandma (Skit)"	Brown	Todd Bee	0:20
18.	"Grandma"	Brown; Barsh; Abdul-Rahman; Sid Sriram	DJ Khalil	3:50
Total length:				47:28

Best Buy deluxe edition (bonus tracks)
No.	Title	Writer(s)	Producer(s)	Length
19.	"Don't Mind" (featuring French Montana and Fabolous)	Brown; Michael Hernandez; Andrew Liburd; Karim Kharbouch; John Jackson	Foreign Teck; Burd & Keyz	3:00
20.	"Back Hurt" (featuring Migos)	Brown; Miguel Cortidor; Danyal Ahmed; Quavious Marshall; Kirsnick Ball; Pierre Thomas	Danny Wolf; Soldado	3:34
Total length:				54:02

Notes

- "Rebirth" and "Psycho" features background vocals from Nikki Grier.
- "Beautiful People" features background vocal from Nikki Grier and Lauren Pardini.
- "Grandma" features background vocals from Sid Sriram, Ajanee Hambrick and Malik Spence.

== Charts ==
=== Weekly charts ===
Chart (2016)	Peak position
Australian Albums (ARIA)	16
Belgian Albums (Ultratop Flanders)	102
Canadian Albums (Billboard)	11
French Albums (SNEP)	142
German Albums (Offizielle Top 100)	77
New Zealand Albums (RMNZ)	35
Norwegian Albums (VG-lista)	34
Swiss Albums (Schweizer Hitparade)	38
UK Albums (Official Charts)	67
US Billboard 200	8
US Top R&B/Hip-Hop Albums (Billboard)	2

=== Year-end charts ===
Chart (2016)	Position
US Top R&B/Hip-Hop Albums (Billboard)	70
