= Ferg Forever =

Mixtape by ASAP Ferg
- Released: November 28, 2014
- Length: 68:44
- Label: ASAP
- Producers: Mike WiLL Made-It; Clams Casino; Big K.R.I.T.; Childish Major; Philo Cult; Crystal Caines; Black Jab; VERYRVRE; DRAM; Corey Moor; Ducko McFli; Stelios Phili; Marvel Alexander; Daffy Ora; Tedd Boyd; A+

ASAP Ferg chronology
| Trap Lord (2013) | Ferg Forever (2014) | Always Strive and Prosper (2016) |

Singles from Ferg Forever
- 1. "Doe-Active" Released: November 17, 2014

Ferg Forever is the debut mixtape by American rapper ASAP Ferg. It was released on November 28, 2014, by ASAP Worldwide. The mixtape features guest appearances from Big Sean, M.I.A., Twista, Bunji Garlin, YG, Wynter Gordon and ASAP Nast, among others. The album was actually released a day after Thanksgiving Day in 2014.

== Background ==
In an interview with Complex, Ferg explained the tape's cover art as the 'Ferg' logo, which belonged to his father (Darold Ferguson), who owns a Harlem Boutique and a printed shirts and logos for record labels, such as Bad Boy Records. Ferg has always been inspired by Fashion through his father's influence, thus creating the brand, along with the title Traplord.

== Critical response ==
Professional ratings
Review scores
| Source | Rating |
|---|---|
| Exclaim! | (7/10) |
| Pitchfork | (6.4/10) |

The mixtape's only single, "Doe-Active" was released on November 17, 2014. The song received positive reviews, with Pitchfork.com praising the track's production and A$AP Ferg's delivery:

"Stelios Phili provides the production for Ferg's newest track, 'Doe-Active', a minimalist beat that could've slid right into Yeezus with its sparse use of blown-out bass and siren-like air horn. There's enough empty space for Ferg to pick and choose his vocal stylings. There's also plenty of room for him to bring some unforgettable hooks without the beat getting too much in the way ('I got a hundred dollar bill for every bump on your face'). The track's real trick, though, is that it's going to leave us all wanting to ball like Adam Levine."

— Matthew Strauss, Pitchfork.com

== Track listing ==
| No. | Title | Writer(s) | Producer(s) | Length |
|---|---|---|---|---|
| 1. | "Perfume" | Darold Brown | Philo Cult | 3:22 |
| 2. | "Jungle" (featuring Marty Baller) | Brown; Crystal Caines | Caines; Black Jab | 3:05 |
| 3. | "Fergsomnia" (featuring Twista) | Brown; Carl Mitchell; Chris Basham; Tashfiqur Patwary; Jeff Washington; Shelley Massenburg-Smith | VERYRVRE; DRAM | 4:13 |
| 4. | "Bonnaroo" (featuring Wynter Gordon) | Brown; Diana Gordon; Justin Scott | Big K.R.I.T. | 3:38 |
| 5. | "Uncle" | Brown; Michael Volpe | Clams Casino | 4:55 |
| 6. | "Thug Cry (Tinashe Mix)" | Brown; Tinashe Kachingwe; Michael Williams II; Asheton Hogan | Mike WiLL Made-It; A+ | 3:49 |
| 7. | "Now" (featuring Mz 007 and Crystal Caines) | Brown; Caines; Scott | Big K.R.I.T. | 2:42 |
| 8. | "Jolly" (featuring Bunji Garlin and Spice) | Brown; Ian Alvarez; Grace Hamilton; Corey Moor | Moor | 2:39 |
| 9. | "Weaves" (featuring Marty Baller and Crystal Caines) | Brown; Caines; Basham; Patwary; Washington | VERYRVRE | 3:38 |
| 10. | "Hood Tales" | Brown; Matthew Washington | Marvel Alexander | 2:54 |
| 11. | "This Side" (featuring YG) | Brown; Keenon Jackson | Ducko McFli; JGramm | 5:34 |
| 12. | "Reloaded (Let It Go, Pt. 2)" (featuring M.I.A. and Crystal Caines) | Brown; Maya Arulpragasam; Caines; Stelios Phili; Cleva Keys; Daffy Ora | Phili; Caines; Ora | 2:56 |
| 13. | "Commitment Issues" | Brown; Markus Randle | Childish Major | 4:00 |
| 14. | "Doe-Active" | Brown; Phili | Phili | 3:14 |
| 15. | "Dope Walk" | Brown; Phili | Phili | 3:51 |
| 16. | "NV" (featuring ASAP Nast) | Brown; Tariq Devega; Tedd Boyd; Washington | Boyd; Marvel Alexander (co.) | 3:56 |
| 17. | "Ja-Rule" (featuring Big Sean) | Brown; Sean Anderson; Phili | Phili | 3:16 |
| 18. | "Real Thing" (featuring SZA) | Brown; Solana Rowe; Phili | Phili | 3:17 |
| 19. | "Talk It" | Brown; Volpe | Clams Casino | 3:45 |

Sample credits

- "Thug Cry" samples the hook, bridge and instrumental from Tinashe's song of the same name.
- "This Side" samples the instrumental from Danny Seth's "I Arise Because".
- "Reloaded (Let It Go Pt. 2)" contains a sample of "Let It Go", as heard in the Disney film Frozen (2013).
- "Uncle" contains a sample of "Pagan Poetry" performed by "Björk".
