= Marty Baller =

American rapper

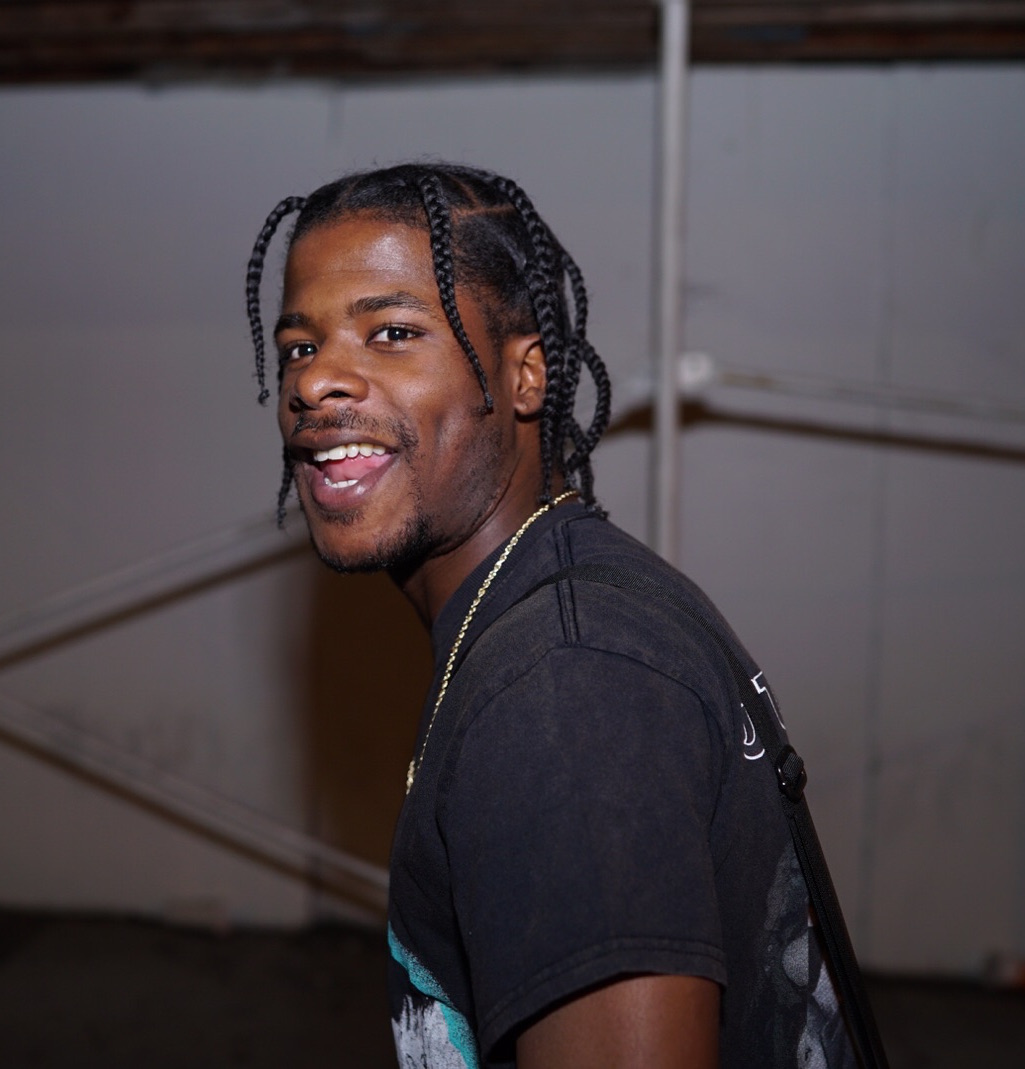

Background information
- Born: Milton Delano Martin III; Harlem, New York City, U.S.
- Genres: Hip hop; trap; EDM
- Occupations: Rapper; singer; songwriter; dancer
- Instrument: Vocals
- Years active: 2013–present
- Member of: ASAP Mob
- Website: iammartyballer.com

Milton Delano Martin III, better known by his stage name Marty Baller, is an American rapper, songwriter, and dancer from the Harlem neighborhood of Manhattan, New York. Aside from his solo career, he was a member of the hip-hop group A$AP Mob and worked as tour hype man to rapper ASAP Ferg.

Marty Baller gained recognition after releasing his debut single "Big Timers", featuring ASAP Ferg, and the track "I'm A Dog", in collaboration with ASAP Ferg and Migos, on his debut mixtape Marty G Raw.

Shortly after launching his solo career, Marty Baller collaborated with such rappers as Lil Uzi Vert, Rich The Kid, Smoke DZA and Fatman Scoop.

== Career ==
In 2007, Marty Baller joined the A$AP Mob crew, a Harlem-based hip-hop collective. Marty was mentioned on ASAP Ferg's single "Shabba" and "New Level". He participated in the weekly installments of Wavy Wednesdays with ASAP Ferg, organized by The Fader.

In 2015, Marty released the track "Big Timers" taking from the hip-hop duo Big Tymers and featuring ASAP Ferg. Marty then released his solo mixtape Marty G Raw on November 11, 2016 with guest features from ASAP Ferg and Migos.

== Reception ==
According to XXL, Marty Baller "is carving out his own path in hip-hop". Noisey wrote "Marty Baller is breaking through. Previously known for a supporting role in A$AP Mob, he's…putting out promising tracks and [is] ready".

== Influences ==
In an interview with The Hundreds, Marty Baller stated his influences are ASAP Rocky, ASAP Ferg, Jay-Z, Lil Wayne, Andre 3000 and Michael Jackson.

== Discography ==
Commercial mixtapes

- Marty G Raw (2016)
- Baller Nation (2017)
- International Baller (2018)
- One Nation (2018)
