= B Boy (song) =

Single by Meek Mill featuring Big Sean and ASAP Ferg
- Released: January 3, 2015
- Recorded: 2014–2015
- Genre: Hip-hop
- Length: 3:36
- Label: Maybach Music; Atlantic
- Songwriters: Darold Ferguson; Robert Williams; Sean Anderson
- Producer: Sap

Meek Mill singles chronology
"They Don't Love You No More" (2014)	"B Boy" (2015)	"All Eyes on You" (2015)

Big Sean singles chronology
"Blessings" (2015)	"B Boy" (2015)	"How Many Times" (2015)

ASAP Ferg singles chronology
"My Song 5" (2014)	"B Boy" (2015)	"New Level" (2015)

"B Boy" is a song by American hip hop recording artist Meek Mill, released as a non-single by Maybach Music Group and Atlantic Records on January 3, 2015. The hip hop song, which was produced by Sap, features guest appearances from Big Sean and ASAP Ferg.

== Critical reception ==
Tierney McAfee of Hollywood Life praised Big Sean's verse writing that "he seems to be rapping about random hookups in “B-Boy”, we’re sure it's just for show since we know he only has eyes for one woman — Ariana!". Writing for MTV, Adam Fleischer noted that the track has only bars instead of hook, commenting that "ain’t anything wrong with that".

== Music video ==
A music video for the track, directed by Spike Jordan, was released on January 29, 2015.

== Charts ==
Chart (2015)	Peak position
US Bubbling Under Hot 100 (Billboard)	7
US Hot R&B/Hip-Hop Songs (Billboard)	39
