= Traplord =

Clothing and lifestyle brand

- Industry: Retail, E-commerce
- Founded: Harlem, New York City, U.S.
- Founder: ASAP Ferg
- Headquarters: New York City, U.S.
- Area served: North America, Asia, Europe, Australia
- Products: Apparel
- Website: traplord.com

Traplord is a New York City-based street fashion clothing and lifestyle brand that started in late 2012 by A$AP Mob member, ASAP Ferg. The clothing company is an extension of what started as a merchandise business for products to be sold on tour, but developed into a full-fledged brand based on A$AP Ferg's history in design and fashion.

== History ==
ASAP Ferg's father, Darold Ferguson, owned a Harlem boutique and printed shirts and logos for record labels such as Bad Boy Records. Before starting his music career, Ferg was heavily influenced by his father's work and pursued a career in fashion. In 2005, he launched a clothing and jewelry line to design and distribute high-end belts worn by celebrities such as Chris Brown, Swizz Beatz, and Diggy Simmons.

After starting his music career, Ferg put these projects on hold. While on tour in the United States, he created the brand "Traplord", which he designed and manufactured himself. The brand started with merchandise for sale during tours. As his popularity in the music world grew, so did his brand. It became a lifestyle and a well-known streetwear brand throughout Asia, Europe, and Australia.

== Style ==
As a streetwear brand, Traplord has also been seen in the skater and BMX scene and has been worn by BMX rider Nigel Sylvester. It is usually styled in colors such as black and white, camouflage prints, snapbacks, and bucket hats. The brand has been embraced by fellow artists such as Wale, Big Sean, ASAP Rocky and others.

== Collaborations ==
BAPE's Jay West designed the T-shirt that combines the animated stained-glass version of the Trap Lord album artwork while Ferg is holding the company's trademark Baby Milo logo.

The capsule collection in collaboration with Young & Reckless is exclusively released through PacSun. Young & Reckless merged the designs of Traplord, as well as the mass appeal of their own brand.

A release of clothing with a new iTunes app Virgin Mega, where they created a virtual interactive line through their smart phone. This collaboration with Virgin Mega inspired a line of apparel exclusively for Syracuse University which included a snapback hat, long sleeve tee, cropped crew neck, and a bucket hat.

The capsule collection with an Australian retailer, Culture Kings, was the first of its kind. An ASAP Ferg Australia Tour increased Traplord's popularity in Australia and led to the collaboration.
