= Shabba (song) =

2013 single by ASAP Ferg featuring ASAP Rocky

Single by ASAP Ferg featuring ASAP Rocky

from the album Trap Lord
- Released: July 16, 2013
- Recorded: 2013
- Length: 4:41
- Label: A$AP Worldwide; Polo Grounds; RCA
- Songwriters: Darold Ferguson Jr.; Rakim Mayers; Herschell Gordon Lewis; Curtis Samuel; Matthew Washington
- Producer: Snugsworth

ASAP Ferg singles chronology
| "Work (Remix)" (2013) | "Shabba" (2013) | "Hood Pope" (2013) |

ASAP Rocky singles chronology
| "Wild for the Night" (2013) | "Shabba" (2013) | "Fashion Killa" (2013) |

Music video
- "Shabba" on YouTube

"Shabba" is a song by American hip hop recording artist ASAP Ferg. It was released on July 16, 2013, as the second single from his debut studio album Trap Lord (2013). The song, produced by Snugsworth, features a guest appearance from Ferg's ASAP Mob cohort ASAP Rocky. The song's title refers to Jamaican dancehall musician Shabba Ranks, who makes a cameo appearance in the song's music video and appears on the remix. The song was certified platinum by the Recording Industry Association of America (RIAA).

== Music video ==
The video, directed by Andy Hines and released on July 15, 2013, revolves around Ferg being pampered in a rustic estate and being served and entertained by two blonde caucasian young women; Madison and Emma Wyatt. Ferg then does a verse in the bathroom mirror while a blonde takes a bath. Then Ferg and Rocky sit in a red convertible with the two blondes in the driveway, dancing seated while a cameoing Shabba Ranks dances in front of the vehicle with Ferg's eyes becoming cartoonish coming down the stairs. The ASAP Mob cameos in one scene are seated at a dining room table reminiscent of da Vinci's The Last Supper, with ASAP Yams looking heavily under the influence. They all start banging the table with cutlery in hand, reminiscent of the childhood chant; "We want food!". The rest of the video is a party with them camera mugging, and the video ends with Ferg with a black woman.

== Critical reception ==
On December 2, 2013, Complex named "Shabba" the third best song released in 2013. They commented saying, "As the son of Trini parents growing up in Harlem, Ferg was raised around Caribbean sounds, so it's fascinating to see him pay tribute to the dancehall emperor by breaking down Shabba's essence to a mathematical equation. “Eight gold rings” x “four gold chains” x “two bad bitches” x “one gold tooth” = Shabba Ranks. Getting Shabba to appear in the song's infectiously raucous video, and later on a remix, is more than a co-sign, it's a coup de grace that elevates this sure-shot party-starter to more than just a simple shout-out. So when Ferg says “my ute don't ramp with me,” trust and believe that he knows exactly what he's talking about." Pitchfork Media ranked it at number 23 on their list of the top 100 tracks of 2013. They elaborated saying, "Ferg's rubberband flow tauntingly flossing about making raw-dogging his key to relationship trust, rocking gear like it's Mortal Kombat couture. [...] Even with all the punchlines, it's a performance driven almost entirely by charisma – factory-line machinery beats assembling a disco-lit 25-foot riser for Ferg and Rocky to ascend, their Morse code stutter-step voices slipping into a semi-patois flow so catchy it could get away with saying less than it actually does."

== Charts ==
| Chart (2013) | Peak position |
|---|---|
| US Billboard Bubbling Under Hot 100 Singles | 7 |
| US Hot R&B/Hip-Hop Songs (Billboard) | 34 |

== Certifications ==
| Region | Certification | Certified units/sales |
|---|---|---|
| Australia (ARIA) | Gold | 35,000^{‡} |
| Canada (Music Canada) | Platinum | 80,000^{‡} |
| New Zealand (RMNZ) | Platinum | 30,000^{‡} |
| United States (RIAA) | 2× Platinum | 2,000,000^{‡} |
^{‡} Sales+streaming figures based on certification alone.

== Release history ==
| Country | Date | Format | Label |
|---|---|---|---|
| United States | July 16, 2013 | Digital download | ASAP Worldwide, Polo Grounds, RCA |
| United States | September 20, 2013 | Urban contemporary | ASAP Worldwide, Polo Grounds, RCA |

== Remix ==
On November 22, 2013, the remix featuring Shabba Ranks, Busta Rhymes and Migos was released.

"Shabba Remix"

Single by ASAP Ferg featuring Shabba Ranks, Busta Rhymes, and Migos
- Released: November 23, 2013
- Genre: Hip hop
- Length: 4:57
- Songwriters: Big Gator BOSSMAN.; Herschell Gordon Lewis; Snugsworth; Kiari Cephus; Darold Ferguson Jr.; Kirshnik Ball; Rakim Mayers; Trevor Smith Jr.; Quavious Smith; Rexton Gordon
- Producer: Snugsworth
