= Trap Lord =

Studio album by ASAP Ferg
- Released: August 20, 2013
- Recorded: 2012–13
- Genres: East Coast hip hop; trap
- Length: 51:08
- Labels: ASAP; Polo Grounds; RCA
- Producers: ASAP Ferg (exec.); ASAP Rocky (exec.); ASAP Yams (exec.); Bryan Leach (exec.); Geno Sims (exec.); HighDefRazjah; Snugsworth; Crystal Caines; Finatik N Zac; Chinza//Fly Beats; Frankie P; High Class Filth; Jim Jonsin; Ian "Napolian" Davis; Ozhora Miyagi; P On The Boards; Rico Love; VersA Beatz; VERYRVRE

ASAP Ferg chronology
Trap Lord (2013)	Ferg Forever (2014)

Singles from Trap Lord
- 1. "Work REMIX" Released: May 14, 2013; 2. "Shabba" Released: July 16, 2013; 3. "Hood Pope" Released: July 30, 2013

Trap Lord is the debut studio album by American rapper ASAP Ferg. The album was released on August 20, 2013, by ASAP Worldwide, Polo Grounds Music, and RCA Records. The album features guest appearances from ASAP Rocky, Bone Thugs-n-Harmony, French Montana, Trinidad James, Schoolboy Q, Waka Flocka Flame, Aston Matthews, B-Real and Onyx.

The album was supported by three singles; the remix to "Work" which featured ASAP Rocky, Schoolboy Q, Trinidad James and French Montana, the album's most commercially successful single "Shabba" featuring ASAP Rocky, and "Hood Pope". It was met with generally positive reviews from music critics, and debuted at number nine on the Billboard 200.

== Background ==
The album was originally slated to be released as a mixtape in February 2013. In January 2013, during an interview with XXL, ASAP Ferg explained the significance of the album title, saying: "I feel like it's not just me that represents Trap Lord. I feel like A$AP Rocky is a Trap Lord. I feel like Nast is a Trap Lord. Wale just posted a picture on his Instagram wearing a Trap Lord sweatshirt. DJ Enuff be sending me pictures of his sons wearing Trap Lord stuff. You gonna see a lot of different new faces that represent the brand—not only the brand, but where we come from. A Trap Lord is basically the struggle to do better. It's almost like the theme of Always Strive And Prosper (A$AP). Trap don't necessarily mean you selling drugs. You could be selling clothes, watches, fake watches, gold teeth, hats—anything. You just trapping. And you a Lord of it." He also explained when he would be releasing the album, saying: "I'm looking at the end of February, early March. This is my first demo I'm ever putting out. I never even put out a demo for the labels to hear. This is the first shit I'm even putting together with numbers, with songs. So I wanna make sure it's something special, I'm giving it my all. That's why it's kind of taking long. But trust me, when it comes out, it's gonna be well worth it."

He also explained what it was like working on the album, saying: "It's fun, because I've been piecing together a team that I think I'm gonna be with for a long time as far as mixing, recording, young producers that you probably never even heard of. Sonically, it's gonna be a monster. Straight movie shit. You ain't hearing this shit nowhere—nobody has this sound. After this mixtape drop, you gonna hear everybody sound change. They gonna wanna know who's working on my project 'cause it's gonna sound that crazy. The best part is teaming up with these young rocket scientists that know what they doing. They rebels against anything that's in cycle; they wanna go against the grain and make history. That's all I'm about, is making history. I'm tired of the same hip-hop shit. It's getting corny. All of this jumping around, looking stupid. I hate the term "real hip-hop," but it's real. Nobody can say my shit ain't hip-hop, because I'm being innovative and I'm bringing something new to the table."

On June 3, 2013, while performing at Summer Jam, ASAP Ferg announced Trap Lord would be released as an album on August 20, 2013. In June 2013, during an interview with HipHopDX, ASAP Ferg described the album, saying: "It's going to be all digital...all Internet-based, and I'm definitely excited. This is the first piece of work I've ever put together, like ever. I never attempted to put a mixtape together; I never attempted to put an album together; I never thought I was going to be a rapper. This is the first project I've worked on. I kind of went extra out of my way to make sure it's the best, because I don't know...all I know is go hard, and all I know is how to win. I don't want to be considered weak or a loser. I think it's going to make history." In July 2013, during an interview with MTV, ASAP Ferg spoke about the features on the album, saying: "I got some of the best of the best on there. It just got serious and more serious because my features are like Bone Thugs-n-Harmony. I got Onyx on the same song as B-Real, It's a kind of legendary piece of work, it's like art. You can't really give good art away for nothing." On July 25, 2013, the album cover was released. On July 28, 2013, the final track listing was revealed, revealing 13 tracks and guest appearances on the album from ASAP Rocky, Bone Thugs-n-Harmony, Maad Moiselle, French Montana, Trinidad James, Schoolboy Q, Waka Flocka Flame, B-Real, Onyx and Aston Matthews.

== Singles ==
On August 20, 2012, Ferg released his commercial debut single "Work". On January 14, 2013, the music video for "Work" was released. "Work" had peaked at number 100 on the US Billboard Hot 100. "Work" was officially remixed, featuring guest verses from fellow American rappers French Montana, Trinidad James, Schoolboy Q and ASAP Rocky; it was later released on May 14, 2013, the remix was released as the album's first official single. On May 14, 2013, the music video for the "Work" (Remix), was also released. On July 16, 2013, the album's second single "Shabba", featuring ASAP Rocky was released. On July 15, 2013, the music video for "Shabba" featuring ASAP Rocky was released. On July 30, 2013, the third single "Hood Pope" was released along with the pre-order of the album. On November 22, 2013, the "Shabba" (Remix) featuring Shabba Ranks, Migos and Busta Rhymes was released. On December 31, 2013, the music video was released for "Hood Pope". On March 7, 2014, the music video was released for "Let It Go".

== Critical reception ==
Professional ratings
Aggregate scores
Source	Rating
Metacritic	72/100
Review scores
Source	Rating
AllMusic	4/5 stars
Consequence of Sound	3.5/5 stars
Exclaim!	7/10
Fact	3.5/5 stars
Now	3/5 stars
Pitchfork	7.5/10
PopMatters	7/10
Rolling Stone	3/5 stars
Spin	7/10
XXL	(L)

Trap Lord was met with generally positive reviews from music critics. At Metacritic, which assigns a normalized rating out of 100 to reviews from critics, the album received an average score of 72, which indicates "generally favorable reviews", based on 18 reviews. Lauren Martin of Fact gave the album three-and-a-half stars out of five, saying "Whilst Earl may have the lyrical indie corner down with Doris, Trap Lord posits Ferg as the more ambiguous of the two, once again shifting the goal-posts of what rap can achieve in 2013 with its endearing, street-rap-goes-weird mindset." Dan Buyanovsky of XXL gave the album an L, saying "There are a few shining moments on Trap Lord, like the swaying "Hood Pope," which finds Ferg crooning about finding his purpose in bleak surroundings, and "Cocaine Castle," a ruminating, meandering ode to the dark side of drug excess. For a guy who's able to craft such challenging songs, it's a shame to see him waste his talent on a batch of hood anthems, but maybe that's all it takes to become a Trap Lord. On the album's intro, A$AP Mob's leader A$AP Yams proclaims, "The limbs never been so relaxed, ever." You can't help but wonder if Ferg hadn't been so relaxed making Trap Lord, it might've come out a much stronger work." Anthony Asencio of HipHopDX gave the album three-and-a-half stars out of five, saying "Overall, A$AP Ferg's Trap Lord, is a solid, if an sometimes-uninspired effort. It occupies that zone between the mindless "turn up" music and projects that have gotten a praise for being entertaining enough to at least partially negate a desire for more depth. Ferg is at his best on the handful of songs that reach for something more than male bravado and flossing. But, in the end, listeners don't get enough of those or his agile rhyme cadences to push this into the realm of an upper-echelon album."

David Jeffries of AllMusic gave the album four out of five stars, saying "With the deep, dark, and delicious Trap Lord, A$AP Ferg enters the A$AP Mob's immersive murder music hall of fame, having crafted an album as out there and attractive as A$AP Rocky's official debut Long.Live.A$AP. Big difference here is that while Rocky fits in perfectly with kinetic and weird folks like Danny Brown, Ferg comes off as a tough, cold Bun B or even Notorious B.I.G.-type character, making music that should only be listened to once night falls and cooking up stern, infectious thug anthems like the posse cut "Work." Phillip Mlynar of Spin gave the album a seven out of ten, saying "There's nothing on Trap Lord to suggest Ferg will follow A$AP Rocky onto the pop charts, but it's a rewardingly dark and grounded listen. With its rugged, ribald appeal, it's the sort of album that you'd imagine Big himself happily enjoying. Just don't tell Puff." Julia LeConte of Now gave the album three out of five stars, saying "Trap Lord's production is unrelenting in its gothic intensity. The woozy party-gone-wrong aesthetic of Rocky is back, but Ferg's sound is distinctly his, and, yes, trappy. His deep, smooth singing voice serves him well on Future-like rap-singing hybrids, but he lacks any of that artist's levity."

Mike Powell of Rolling Stone gave the album three out of five stars, saying "This Harlem-bred MC is more an interior designer than a master carpenter, a rapper whose real gift isn't rapping but curating sound. No surprise coming from a member of the A$AP Mob crew, whose fashion choices get as much attention as their music. Slow, silky and menacing, with twists of eccentricity, his debut is a finely constructed mood piece—say it ties the room together." Francesca D'Arcy-Orga of PopMatters gave the album a seven out of ten, saying "Trap Lord won't be for everyone, but it's worth more than one listen, because beneath the trap beats and somewhat cliché storyline is a debut album that's exciting, different, and worth a spot on the shelf." Aaron Matthews of Exclaim! gave the album a seven out of ten, saying "In contrast to comrade Rocky's music, Trap Lord succeeds largely despite its production, fuelled by Ferg's oddball enthusiasm and sincerity. You don't have to accept the Trap Lord as your saviour, but you'll have more fun if you do." Paul Cantor Vibe gave the album a positive review, saying "Trap Lord is an underground rap album for listeners reared on a decade of 808s and melodic variations of John Carpenter's "Halloween" melody. It's the sound of old New York gracefully mixing with the new New York. And it's really good, basically."

=== Accolades ===
Trap Lord was named the eighth best album of 2013 by Complex. They commented saying, "it's not the lyrics that make Ferg worth listening to. It's his delivery that keeps you enthralled. That and his beats. A dark morass of sticky, nasty smoke-out funk." Pitchfork placed Trap Lord on their Albums of the Year: Honorable Mention list. Trap Lord was named the ninth-best hip hop album of 2013 by Rolling Stone. They elaborated saying, "The Mob wingman delivered two of New York's biggest street heaters this year with "Work" and "Shabba"; the rest of Trap Lord expanded the crew's sonic reference points, landing somewhere between Bone Thugs for the Tumblr sect (check his mournful croning on "Hood Pope") and an SNL parody of a Nineties-era Bad Boy compilation."

== Commercial performance ==
The album debuted at number 9 on the Billboard 200 chart, with first-week sales of 32,000 copies in the United States. In its second week, the album sold 9,000 more copies. In its third week, the album sold 9,000 more copies bringing its total album sales to 46,000 in the United States. On November 8, 2019, the album was certified gold by the Recording Industry Association of America (RIAA) for shipments of 500,000 units in the United States.

== Track listing ==
No.	Title	Writer(s)	Producer(s)	Length
1.	"Let It Go"	Darold Brown; Vaquan Wilkins	Razjah	4:42
2.	"Shabba" (featuring ASAP Rocky)	Brown; Curtis Samuel; Matthew Washington; Rakim Mayers; Herschell Gordon Lewis	Snugsworth	4:35
3.	"Lord" (featuring Bone Thugs-n-Harmony)	Brown; Crystal Caines; Ozhora Miyagi; Bryan McCane; Anthony Henderson; Steven Howse; Stanley Howse	Ian Davis; Crystal Caines	5:17
4.	"Hood Pope"	Brown; Jeff Washington; Tashfiqur Patwary; Chris Basham	VERYRVRE	3:30
5.	"Fergivicious"	Brown; Mostafa Robaee	Versa Beatz	3:50
6.	"4:02"	Brown; Frank Parra	Frankie P	3:35
7.	"Dump Dump"	Brown; Patricio Contreras	A$AP P on the Boards	3:34
8.	"Work REMIX" (featuring ASAP Rocky, French Montana, Trinidad James & Schoolboy Q)	Brown; Steven Pugh; Mayers; Nicholas Williams; Karim Kharbouch; Matthew Hanley	Chinza//Fly	4:43
9.	"Didn't Wanna Do That"	Brown; Parra; Luis Gonzalez; Toledano Salinas	Frankie P	2:44
10.	"Murda Something" (featuring Waka Flocka Flame)	Brown; James Scheffer; Rico Love; Michael Mule; Isaac De Boni; Nikolas Marzouca; Juaquin Malphurs	Rico Love; FnZ; Jim Jonsin	3:19
11.	"Make a Scene" (featuring Maad Moiselle)	Brown; Parra	Frankie P	2:57
12.	"Fuck Out My Face" (featuring B-Real, Onyx & Aston Matthews)	Brown; Parra; Louis Freese; Kirk Jones; Fred Scruggs; Tyrone Taylor; Aston Matthews	Frankie P	3:56
13.	"Cocaine Castle"	Brown; Spencer Sleyon	High Class Filth	4:26
Total length:				51:08

== Charts ==
=== Weekly charts ===
Chart (2013)	Peak position
UK Albums (OCC)	85
UK R&B Chart (Official Charts Company)	8
US Billboard 200	9
US Top R&B/Hip-Hop Albums (Billboard)	4

=== Year-end charts ===
Chart (2013)	Position
US Top R&B/Hip-Hop Albums (Billboard)	74
Chart (2014)	Position
US Top R&B/Hip-Hop Albums (Billboard)	96

=== Certifications ===
Region	Certification	Certified units/sales
Canada (Music Canada)	Gold	40,000^{‡}
United States (RIAA)	Gold	500,000^{‡}
^{‡} Sales+streaming figures based on certification alone.
