= Darold (album) =

Studio album by ASAP Ferg
- Released: November 8, 2024
- Genre: Hip-hop
- Length: 40:37
- Label: ASAP; Polo Grounds; RCA

ASAP Ferg chronology
Floor Seats II (2020)	Darold (2024)	Flip Phone Shorty - Strictly For Da Streetz Vol. 1 (2025)

Singles from Darold
- 1. "Allure" Released: October 4, 2024; 2. "Thought I Was Dead" Released: October 18, 2024

Darold is the third studio album by American rapper ASAP Ferg. In was released on November 8, 2024, through ASAP Worldwide, Polo Grounds Music, and RCA Records, marking his first project in four years. The album features artists such as Future, Denzel Curry, Mike Will Made It, and Mary J. Blige.

== Background ==
On October 4, 2024, Ferguson announced his third studio album, Darold, with the release of its debut single "Allure", with rapper Future and producer Mike Will Made It as features.

Ferguson told Hypebeast that Darold would be "his most vulnerable album yet." As Ferguson explained the album, he said "I'm getting – I won't say older, but I'm getting wiser – and I've lived a lot of life. It's okay to grow up, and that's what I want to show my community on this album." "Alive", an example of his vulnerability, is brought up as the rapper reflects on his hardships, as said: "As I get more aware it's hard to stay engaged / When you notice all your peers ain't on the same page / I'm unhappy about music in its current state / I'm unhappy about my appetite and my current weight / I'm unhappy about my friends and how they handle certain things / Growing pains make it stressful to go through certain change."

Shortly after the album's release, Ferguson revealed an experience when he was sexually molested when he was a child, which served as the story for one of its tracks, "Pool". As stated, "At ten I was drowned and touched when I was in the pool/All the breath left my body where I couldn't move," he raps on the song. "Violated, hand on my private by a bigger dude/Seconds felt like forever, really wasn't cool/When he seen me 'round the block, he'd smile and laugh/As if we had a little secret, and I hated that/Thinking 'bout what he did really made me mad/Even thought about murder, wanted to kill his ass/Told nobody except my cousin/One time, he made a joke, but he ain't know nothing/I asked God, 'Why me? Let me know something!'/I like girls, fuck he thought, that nigga on something?"

== Release ==
Darold was released to streaming services on November 8, 2024, by ASAP Worldwide, Polo Grounds Music, and RCA Records. Ferguson states that the album title comes from his birth name (Darold Brown Ferguson) and that he made the cover art for the album and singles himself.

"This album means the world to me!!!", he wrote in a separate post. "This is a literal work of art. I started painting again during the pandemic and flirted with the idea of doing my own cover art for my album. The therapeutic nature of brush on canvas put me in a zone and I decided I'd just do all my single covers myself. The vibe was fresh and I was back hooked on painting again."

== Track listing ==
Darold track listing
No.	Title	Writer(s)	Producer(s)	Length
1.	"Light Work" (featuring Bloody Osiris, DD Osama, Soul II Soul, and the Alumni Ensemble of Harlem)	Darold Brown	Youagoodkid; MCVertt; Taavi Haapala	2:32
2.	"Thought I Was Dead"	Lex Luger; Michael Williams; Brown	Mike Will Made It; Lex Luger	2:28
3.	"Alive :(" (featuring Dapper Dan)	Kelvin Krash; Ade Odunlami; Daoud Anthony; Brown; Rodaidh McDonald	Eric Hudson; Acyde; McDonald; Daoud	4:05
4.	"Allure" (featuring Future and Mike Will Made It)	Brown; Jean Marcel Day; Williams; Nayvadius Wilburn	Mike Will Made It; Truebeatzz	3:28
5.	"Demons" (featuring Denzel Curry)	Mills; Perkins; Jo-Vaughn Scott; Derek Gamlam; Mario Luciano; Tobias Breuer	Krash	2:16
6.	"Messy"	Odunlami; Bron; McDonald	Hudson; Acyde; McDonald	3:20
7.	"French Tips" (featuring Coco Jones)	Brown; Courtney Jones	Mario Winans; Tropkillaz	3:06
8.	"Dead Homies" (featuring BLKPRL and Elminene)	Krash; Abdala Elamin; Odunlami; BLKPRL; Brown; Kelvin Magnusen; McDonald	Krash; Acyde; McDonald	3:53
9.	"Casting Spells" (featuring Mary J. Blige)	Odunlami; Anthony; Brown; Winans; McDonald; Mary Blige	Winans; Acyde; McDonald; Daoud	3:54
10.	"Pool" (featuring Elmiene)	Elamin; Odunlami; Anthony; Brown; McDonald	Acyde; McDonald; Daoud	4:34
11.	"Chosen" (featuring Mary J. Blige and Shay Rock)	Angela Winbush; Brown; Winans; Blige	Winans	4:04
12.	"Darold" (featuring Nikki Nelms)	Allan Lopez; Brown; Emmanuel Kouadio; Kingsley Izenwata; Powers Pleasant	Kash Beats; Powers Pleasant; Tweek Tune; Manny Laurenko	2:51
Total length:				40:37
