= Plain Jane (song) =

2017 single by ASAP Ferg

Single by ASAP Ferg

from the album Still Striving
- Released: June 13, 2017
- Recorded: 2017
- Genre: Hip hop
- Length: 2:54
- Label: RCA
- Songwriters: Darold Ferguson, Jr.; Kirlan Labarrie; Paul Beauregard; Jordan Houston
- Producer: Kirk Knight

ASAP Ferg singles chronology
| "Look at Us Now" (2017) | "Plain Jane" (2017) | "Nasty (Who Dat)" (2017) |

Music video
- "Plain Jane" on YouTube

Remix
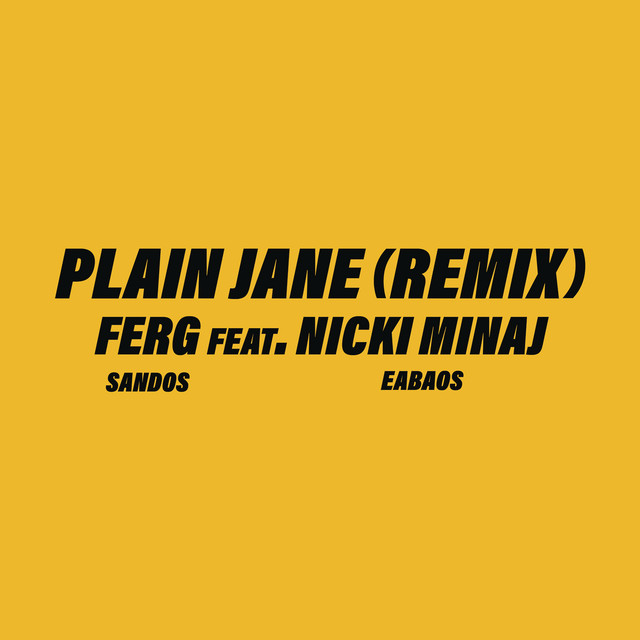
- Cover art of the official remix featuring Nicki Minaj.

Nicki Minaj singles chronology
| "The Way Life Goes (Remix)" (2017) | "Plain Jane (Remix)" (2017) | "Barbie Tingz" (2018) |

"Plain Jane" is a song by the American rapper ASAP Ferg. The song was released on June 13, 2017, as the lead single from his third album, Still Striving (2017). It was produced by Kirk Knight, and it is a hip-hop song. The official remix featuring fellow New York City–based rapper Nicki Minaj was released on December 15, 2017. This version peaked at number 26 on the Billboard Hot 100, becoming his second highest-charting single until "Move Ya Hips" in 2020—which also featured Minaj.

== Background and composition ==
"Plain Jane" is one of four tracks released by A$AP Ferg on June 13, 2017, via SoundCloud for TrapLord Tuesdays. Produced by Pro Era's own Kirk Knight, the track's flow and instrumental are heavily influenced by the 1999 song "Slob on My Knob" by Tear Da Club Up Thugs. Ferg reflects his childhood growing up and pays homage to ASAP Yams ("Yamborghini chain, rest in peace to my superior"). He also raps about "eating Rihanna like a panini" ("Please believe me, I see RiRi, I'mma eat it like panini") and suggests having a foursome with his girlfriend, Kendall Jenner, Bella and Gigi Hadid.

== Music video ==
The official music video of the song was released on October 11, 2017. Directed by Bronx director Hidji, it opens with ASAP Ferg standing in an apartment hallway tying his do-rag, with a clip of Juicy J's verse on an unreleased remix of the song playing in the background. It then follows Ferg surrounded by a crew of BMX bike riders, as they ride through Harlem before going to a night club. The video features cameos from cyclists Nigel Sylvester and RRDBlocks, who join Ferg and do tricks, as well as from DRAM and Rihanna.

== Track listing ==
| No. | Title | Writer(s) | Producer(s) | Length |
|---|---|---|---|---|
| 1. | "Plain Jane" | Darold Brown; Kirlan Labarrie; Paul Beauregard; Jordan Houston | Kirk Knight | 2:54 |
| 2. | "Plain Jane" (Remix) (featuring Nicki Minaj) | Darold Brown; Kirlan Labarrie; Paul Beauregard; Jordan Houston; Onika Maraj | Kirk Knight | 3:24 |
| Total length: | | | | 6:18 |

== Remix ==
A remix to the single was released on December 15, 2017, with a guest appearance from the American rapper Nicki Minaj. The remix was originally meant to be included on Lil Wayne's Dedication 6 mixtape, but after playing it for Ferg, Minaj agreed to make it the official remix instead. Minaj's verse includes references to Tidal, The Notorious B.I.G., Catherine Zeta Jones, and Lupita Nyong'o. Phemza The Kween also freestyled the song. There is an unreleased remix version of the song featuring Juicy J, who shared his verse in May 2018.

Minaj's remix received critical acclaim. Billboard said "Nicki Minaj brought back that hard rap we've been missing from her for years, paying homage to her New York roots and local legend Notorious B.I.G." XXL writes "the female MC delivers some hardcore rhymes and punchlines on the catchy tracks," and Complex noted that, due to Minaj, "one of the best loved songs of the year is about to get even more love".

== Chart performance ==
Following months of hovering around the top 40, "Plain Jane" was propelled by its remix to its peak at number 26 on the Billboard Hot 100, Ferg's second highest entry on the chart. The song has also charted in Canada, at number 30.

== Charts ==
=== Weekly charts ===
| Chart (2017–2018) | Peak position |
|---|---|
| Australia (ARIA) | 74 |
| Belgium (Ultratip Bubbling Under Flanders) | 4 |
| Belgium (Ultratip Bubbling Under Wallonia) | 4 |
| Canada Hot 100 (Billboard) | 30 |
| Greece International (IFPI) | 73 |
| Hungary (Single Top 40) | 35 |
| Latvia (DigiTop100) | 35 |
| Netherlands (Single Tip) | 5 |
| New Zealand (Recorded Music NZ) | 38 |
| Portugal (AFP) | 82 |
| Slovakia Singles Digital (ČNS IFPI) | 81 |
| Sweden (Sverigetopplistan) | 92 |
| Switzerland (Schweizer Hitparade) | 92 |
| UK Singles (OCC) | 79 |
| US Billboard Hot 100 | 26 |
| US Hot R&B/Hip-Hop Songs (Billboard) | 13 |
| US Rhythmic Airplay (Billboard) | 12 |

=== Year-end charts ===
| Chart (2018) | Position |
|---|---|
| Canada (Canadian Hot 100) | 77 |
| US Billboard Hot 100 | 74 |
| US Hot R&B/Hip-Hop Songs (Billboard) | 39 |
| US Rhythmic (Billboard) | 38 |

== Certifications ==
| Region | Certification | Certified units/sales |
|---|---|---|
| Australia (ARIA) | 3× Platinum | 210,000^{‡} |
| Canada (Music Canada) | 5× Platinum | 400,000^{‡} |
| Denmark (IFPI Danmark) | Platinum | 90,000^{‡} |
| France (SNEP) | Gold | 100,000^{‡} |
| Germany (BVMI) | Gold | 200,000^{‡} |
| Italy (FIMI) | Gold | 25,000^{‡} |
| New Zealand (RMNZ) | 4× Platinum | 120,000^{‡} |
| Poland (ZPAV) | Platinum | 50,000^{‡} |
| Portugal (AFP) | Gold | 5,000^{‡} |
| United Kingdom (BPI) | Platinum | 600,000^{‡} |
| United States (RIAA) | 5× Platinum | 5,000,000^{‡} |
^{‡} Sales+streaming figures based on certification alone.
