= Work (ASAP Ferg song) =

2012 single by ASAP Ferg

Single by ASAP Ferg

from the album Lords Never Worry and Trap Lord
- Released: August 20, 2012
- Genre: Hip hop; trap
- Length: 2:59
- Label: ASAP Worldwide; Polo Grounds; RCA
- Songwriters: Darold Ferguson; Steven Pugh
- Producer: Chinza // Fly

ASAP Ferg singles chronology
"Work" (2012)	"Work Remix" (2013)

Music video
- "Work" on YouTube
- "Work Remix" on YouTube

"Work" is a song by American rapper ASAP Ferg, released on August 20, 2012 as his debut solo single. It was the third single released from hip hop collective ASAP Mob's debut studio album Lords Never Worry (2012). The official remix of the song (titled "Work REMIX"), featuring American rappers ASAP Rocky, French Montana, Trinidad James and Schoolboy Q, was released on May 14, 2013. The remix served as the lead single from ASAP Ferg's debut studio album Trap Lord (2013).

== Music videos ==
The official music video of the song was released on January 14, 2013. The video for the remix was released with the accompanying single, and was filmed in two parts with scenes from Los Angeles and Harlem.

== Chart ==
=== Weekly charts ===
Chart (2013)	Peak position
US Billboard Hot 100	100
US Hot R&B/Hip-Hop Songs (Billboard)	30
US Hot Rap Songs (Billboard)	23

=== Year-end charts ===
Chart (2013)	Position
US Hot R&B/Hip-Hop Songs (Billboard)	96

== Certifications ==
Region	Certification	Certified units/sales
Australia (ARIA)	Platinum	70,000^{‡}
Canada (Music Canada)	Platinum	80,000^{‡}
New Zealand (RMNZ)	Platinum	30,000^{‡}
United States (RIAA)	3× Platinum	3,000,000^{‡}
^{‡} Sales+streaming figures based on certification alone.
