= Still Striving =

Mixtape by ASAP Ferg
- Released: August 18, 2017
- Recorded: 2016–2017
- Genre: Hip hop
- Length: 49:13
- Labels: ASAP; Polo Grounds; RCA
- Producers: 30 Roc; Charlie Handsome; Digital Nas; DJ Khalil; Frankie P; Honorable C.N.O.T.E.; Kirk Knight; Maaly Raw; Rex Kudo; Skitzo; Tariq Beats

ASAP Ferg chronology
Always Strive and Prosper (2016)	Still Striving (2017)	Floor Seats (2019)

Singles from Still Striving
- 1. "Plain Jane" Released: June 13, 2017

Professional ratings
Aggregate scores
Source	Rating
Metacritic	65/100
Review scores
Source	Rating
Exclaim!	4/10
HipHopDX	3.7/5
Paste	6.5/10
Pitchfork	6.1/10
Pretty Much Amazing	B−
RapReviews.com	7/10

Still Striving is the second mixtape by American rapper ASAP Ferg. It was released through ASAP Worldwide, Polo Grounds Music, and RCA Records on August 18, 2017. The album features guest appearances from Meek Mill, Cam'ron, Dave East, Lil Yachty, Nav, Famous Dex, Playboi Carti, Migos, ASAP Rocky, MadeinTYO, Busta Rhymes, French Montana, Rick Ross, and Snoop Dogg. It was supported by the single "Plain Jane".

== Background ==
On November 11, 2016, ASAP Ferg revealed the title of his next project. On July 28, 2017, ASAP Ferg revealed the official release date for Still Striving. The project's artwork was revealed on August 2, 2017. The mixtape's lead and only single, "Plain Jane", was released on June 13, 2017.

== Track listing ==
Credits adapted from Tidal.

Still Striving track listing
No.	Title	Writer(s)	Producer(s)	Length
1.	"Trap and a Dream" (featuring Meek Mill)	Darold Ferguson, Jr.; Robert Williams; Frank Parra	Frankie P	3:09
2.	"Rubber Band Man" (featuring Cam'ron)	Ferguson; Cameron Giles; Parra	Frankie P	3:25
3.	"Olympian" (featuring Dave East)	Ferguson; David Brewster, Jr.; Samuel Gloade; Lamont Porter	30 Roc	3:31
4.	"Aww Yeah" (featuring Lil Yachty)	Ferguson; Miles McCollum; Jamaal Henry	Maaly Raw	3:14
5.	"What Do You Do" (featuring Nav)	Ferguson; Navraj Goraya; Masamune Kudo; Ryan Vojtesak	Rex Kudo; Charlie Handsome	2:56
6.	"Coach Cartier" (featuring Famous Dex)	Ferguson; Dexter Gore, Jr.; Parra	Frankie P	3:01
7.	"Mad Man" (featuring Playboi Carti)	Ferguson; Jordan Carter; Carlton Mays, Jr.; Paul Beauregard; Jordan Houston; Ricky Dunigan; Darnell Carlton; Robert Phillips; Lola Mitchell	Honorable C.N.O.T.E.	3:29
8.	"Plain Jane"	Ferguson; Kirlan Labarrie; Beauregard; Houston	Kirk Knight	2:53
9.	"Nasty (Who Dat)" (featuring Migos)	Ferguson; Quavious Marshall; Kirshnik Ball; Dario Rodríguez	Skitzo	3:29
10.	"Mattress (Remix)" (featuring ASAP Rocky, Rich the Kid, Playboi Carti, and Famous Dex)	Ferguson; Rakim Mayers; Dimitri Roger; Carter; Gore; Nasir Pemberton; Keith Roberts	Digital Nas	4:32
11.	"One Night Savage" (featuring MadeinTYO)	Ferguson; Malcolm Davis; Parra	Frankie P	2:32
12.	"East Coast (Remix)" (featuring Busta Rhymes, ASAP Rocky, Dave East, French Montana, Rick Ross, and Snoop Dogg)	Ferguson; Trevor Smith Jr.; Mayers; Brewster Jr.; Karim Kharbouch; William Roberts II; Calvin Broadus Jr.; Khalil Abdul-Rahman; Altariq Crapps; Samuel Barsh	DJ Khalil; Tariq Beats^{[a]}	5:35
13.	"Nandos"	Ferguson; Labarrie	Kirk Knight	2:55
14.	"Tango"	Ferguson; Parra	Frankie P	4:32
Total length:				49:13

Track notes

- ^{^[a]} signifies a co-producer
- "Tango" contains additional vocals by King Kanobby

Sample credits

- "Mad Man" contains a sample of "Tear da Club Up", performed by Three 6 Mafia.
- "Plain Jane" contains portions of "Slob on My Knob", performed by Three 6 Mafia.
- "Nasty (Who Dat)" contains interpolations of "Who Dat", performed by JT Money featuring Solé.

== Personnel ==
Credits adapted from Tidal.

Performers

- ASAP Ferg – primary artist
- Meek Mill – featured artist (track 1)
- Cam'ron – featured artist (track 2)
- Dave East – featured artist (tracks 3, 12)
- Lil Yachty – featured artist (track 4)
- Nav – featured artist (track 5)
- Famous Dex – featured artist (tracks 6, 10)
- Playboi Carti – featured artist (tracks 7, 10)
- Migos – featured artist (track 9)
- ASAP Rocky – featured artist (tracks 10, 12)
- Rich the Kid – featured artist (track 10)
- MadeinTYO – featured artist (track 11)
- Busta Rhymes – featured artist (track 12)
- French Montana – featured artist (track 12)
- Rick Ross – featured artist (track 12)
- Snoop Dogg – featured artist (track 12)
- King Kanobby – additional vocals (track 14)

Technical

- Jeffrey "RAMZY" Ramirez – recording engineer (tracks 1–3, 11)
- King Kanobby – mixing engineer (tracks 1, 4–8, 10, 11, 13, 14)
- Miz The Wiz – assistant mixing engineer (tracks 1, 4–8, 10, 11, 13, 14)
- Ray Seay – mixing engineer (tracks 2, 3)
- Ethan Stevens – recording engineer (track 5)
- Juan "Saucy" Peña – recording engineer (tracks 6, 8)
- Hector Delgado – mixing engineer (tracks 9, 12)
- Federico "C Sik" Lopez – assistant mixing engineer (tracks 9, 12)

Instruments

- Sam Barsh – keyboard (track 12)
- Daniel Seeff – guitar (track 12)

Production

- Frankie P – producer (tracks 1, 2, 6, 11, 14)
- 30 Roc – producer (track 3)
- Maaly Raw – producer (track 4)
- Rex Kudo – producer (track 5)
- Charlie Handsome – producer (track 5)
- Honorable C.N.O.T.E. – producer (track 7)
- Kirk Knight – producer (tracks 8, 13)
- Skitzo – producer (track 9)
- Digital Nas – producer (track 10)
- DJ Khalil – producer (track 12)
- Nick Barbs – A&R (Entire album)
- Tariq Beats – co-producer (track 12)

== Charts ==
=== Weekly charts ===
Chart (2017)	Peak position
Australian Albums (ARIA)	35
Belgian Albums (Ultratop Flanders)	94
Belgian Albums (Ultratop Wallonia)	144
Canadian Albums (Billboard)	13
Dutch Albums (Album Top 100)	64
French Albums (SNEP)	114
Latvian Albums (LaIPA)	27
New Zealand Albums (RMNZ)	32
US Billboard 200	12
US Top R&B/Hip-Hop Albums (Billboard)	7

=== Year-end charts ===
Chart (2017)	Position
US Top R&B/Hip-Hop Albums (Billboard)	74
Chart (2018)	Position
US Billboard 200	158
US Top R&B/Hip-Hop Albums (Billboard)	73

== Certifications ==
Region	Certification	Certified units/sales
United States (RIAA)	Gold	500,000^{‡}
^{‡} Sales+streaming figures based on certification alone.
