= New Level =

Single by ASAP Ferg featuring Future

from the album Always Strive and Prosper
- Released: December 18, 2015
- Recorded: 2015
- Genre: Hip hop; trap
- Length: 4:27
- Label: A$AP Worldwide; Polo Grounds; RCA
- Songwriters: Darold Ferguson; Nayvadius Wilburn; Carlton Mays, Jr.
- Producer: Honorable C.N.O.T.E.

ASAP Ferg singles chronology
"B Boy" (2015)	"New Level" (2015)	"Back Hurt" (2016)

Future singles chronology
"Jumpman" (2015)	"New Level" (2015)	"Stick Talk" (2016)

"New Level" is a song by American rapper ASAP Ferg featuring fellow American rapper Future. It was released on December 18, 2015, as the lead single from the former's second studio album Always Strive and Prosper (2016). Produced by Honorable C.N.O.T.E., the song peaked at number 90 on the Billboard Hot 100, becoming his third highest-charting single. The official remix was released on October 20, 2016 with additional verses from ASAP Rocky and Lil Uzi Vert.

== Release ==
The song premiered online on December 17, 2015, and the next day it was released as a single on iTunes. "New Level" was the first single off Always Strive and Prosper, which was released on April 22, 2016.

== Music video ==
A music video for the song premiered on January 19, 2016 via Noisey. It features cameo appearances by Cleveland Browns wide receiver Josh Gordon, Olympic fencer Daryl Homer, and BMX biker Nigel Sylvester.

== Charts ==
=== Weekly charts ===
Chart (2015–16)	Peak position
US Billboard Hot 100	90
US Hot R&B/Hip-Hop Songs (Billboard)	30

=== Year-end charts ===
Chart (2016)	Position
US Hot R&B/Hip-Hop Songs (Billboard)	96

== Certifications ==
Region	Certification	Certified units/sales
Canada (Music Canada)	Platinum	80,000^{‡}
New Zealand (RMNZ)	Gold	15,000^{‡}
United States (RIAA)	2× Platinum	2,000,000^{‡}
^{‡} Sales+streaming figures based on certification alone.
