= Crystal Caines =

- Also known as: CC
- Born: Crystal Caines
- Origin: Harlem, New York
- Genre: Hip Hop
- Occupations: Artist, Producer, Engineer, Writer
- Years active: 2014–Present
- Label: Independent

Crystal Caines is a Guyanese–American rapper, record producer, artist, songwriter and engineer based in Harlem, New York. She has Produced and been featured on tracks by BIA, Baauer, MIA, Jack Harlow, Bryson Tiller, Ransom, Nick Hook and more.

== Career ==
Crystal Caines is an Artist, Producer and Engineer. She began her production career in 2013. Caines went on to artist develop and produce for ASAP Ferg. In 2013, Caines produced the Bone Thugs-n-Harmony-featuring "Lord" on A$AP Ferg's debut album, Trap Lord, Continuing on to also engineering and premixing vocals for A$AP Ferg's future singles, "Work", "Shabba” and assisted in sonically shaping the majority of the TrapLord Album. Caines draws her inspiration from artists like Eve and producers like No ID.

In 2014, she released her debut single and Video, "Whiteline". Then went on to produce for other artist such as Bia, Ro James, Johnny Cinco, DZA, Abby Jasmine, Jack Harlow, Bryson Tiller, Rah Swish and more.

== Discography ==
=== Singles ===
- Crystal Caines (featuring A$AP) – "Whiteline" (2014)
- Crystal Caines - "No Drama" (2017)
- Crystal Caines- "Bossanova" (2017)
- Crystal Caines- "IKYLI"
- Crystal Caines- "Do That Thing"
- Crystal Caimes- “late night”

=== Guest appearances ===
- BIA (featuring Crystal Caines) – "Love No more" (2014)
- A$AP Ferg - Didn't Wanna Do That
- A$AP Ferg (featuring MIA and Crystal Caines) – "Reloaded (Let it Go pt. 2)" (2014)
- A$AP Ferg (featuring Crystal Caines and Marty Baller) – "Weaves" (2014)
- A$AP Ferg (featuring Mz 007 and Crystal Caines) – "Now" (2014)
- Baauer (featuring Crystal Caines) – "Swoopin" (2014)
- Nick Hook – 'Going Back 2' Feat. Bodega Bamz, Crystal Caines, DJ Sliink & Nadus (2015)
- A$AP Ferg (featuring Skrillex and Crystal Caines) – "Hungry Ham" (2016)
- Dave East - "Talk to Big" (2018)
- Ransom - “Most Dreadful symphony”

=== Production credits ===
- BIA – "Chola season" (2015)
- A$AP Ferg – "A Hundred Million Roses" (2012)
- A$AP Ferg (featuring Bone Thugs-n-Harmony) – "Lord" (2013)
- BIA – "Love No more" (2014)
- BIA – "La Tirana" (2014)
- BIA – "Weekend in Vegas" (2014)(co-prod Black Jab)
- A$AP Ferg (featuring Marty Baller) – "Jungle" (2014)
- A$AP Ferg (featuring MIA and Crystal Caines) – "Reloaded (Let it Go pt. 2)" (2014) (co-prod)
- Al Doe (featuring Johnny Cinco) - "Lost & Found" (2016)
- Smoke Dza - "Rugby" (2016)
- Smoke Dza - "Hands of Time" (2016)
- Jimi Tents (featuring Ro James) - 2 shots
- BBYMUTHA - "Bulma" (co-prod)
- Felly - falling (2018)
- ABBY JASMINE - front door (2019)
- Ro James - freeek (2020) (co-Prod)
- Leeky Bandz - Stanky Leg (2021) (co- prod.)
- Crystal Caines - "Do That Thing" - Ballers HBO
- Shea Moisture - It Comes Naturally (2020)
- Thru the night - Jack Harlow, Bryson Tiller (Co-Prod)
- Moxie Raia - Stick Like Glue
- Marcus Orelias - Spend It Fast, Keep Going, Hustle This Hard
- Rah Swish- Hotter Than Hot(co Prod) 2023
- Rah Swish- Yukatan 2024

=== Writing credits ===
- Moxie Raia - Stick Like Glue (verses)
- Moxie Raia - Good Things
