= ASAP Ferg =

American rapper (born 1988)

A$AP Ferg
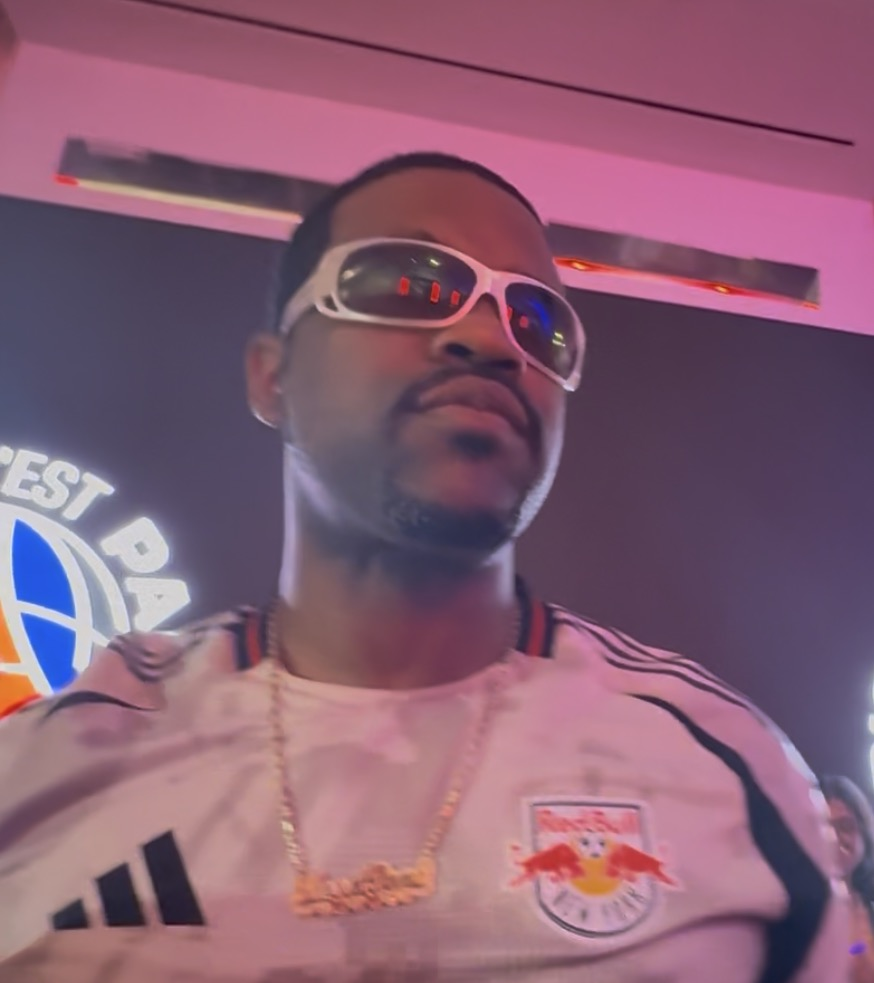
- ASAP Ferg in 2026

Background information
- Also known as: Ferg; Traplord
- Born: Darold Durard Brown Ferguson Jr. October 20, 1988 (age 38); Manhattan, New York City, U.S.
- Genres: East Coast hip-hop; trap
- Occupations: Rapper; singer; songwriter
- Works: ASAP Ferg discography
- Years active: 2007–present
- Labels: Trillagain Island; Roc Nation; ASAP Worldwide; Polo Grounds; RCA (former)
- Member of: ASAP Mob; The Scythe
- Website: fergofficial.com

Darold Durard Brown Ferguson Jr. (born October 20, 1988), known professionally as FERG (previously A$AP Ferg (/ˈeɪsæp/ AY-sap)), is an American rapper, singer and songwriter from Harlem, New York City. He is a lead member of the hip hop collective ASAP Mob, from which he adopted his moniker and recording contract with Polo Grounds Music and RCA Records.

His 2013 single, "Work (Remix)" (featuring ASAP Rocky, French Montana, Schoolboy Q, and Trinidad James), a remix of his 2012 debut single, marked his first entry on the Billboard Hot 100 and received triple platinum certification by the Recording Industry Association of America (RIAA). It preceded his debut studio album Trap Lord (2013), which saw positive critical reception and peaked within the top ten of the Billboard 200 along with his second album, Always Strive and Prosper (2016). His 2017 single, "Plain Jane" (remixed featuring Nicki Minaj), became his first song to peak within the Billboard Hot 100's top 40, while his 2020 single, "Move Ya Hips" (featuring Nicki Minaj and MadeinTYO), peaked at number 19 and remains his highest-charting entry.

Outside of music, Ferguson founded the street fashion brand Traplord, namesake of his debut album, in 2012. In 2013, he was named "Rookie of the Year" at the BET Hip Hop Awards.

== Early life ==
Darold Durard Brown Ferguson Jr. was born on October 20, 1988 in the Harlem neighborhood of New York City to Trinidadian parents. Ferg was raised in Hamilton Heights. His father, Darold Ferguson, owned a small Harlem boutique and printed shirts and created logos for record labels; including Bad Boy Records and Uptown Records and performers Teddy Riley, Heavy D and Bell Biv DeVoe. Before starting his music career, Ferg initially aspired to start his own clothing line. Inspired by his father, who died of kidney failure, Ferg launched clothing and jewelry lines at a young age and attended art school. In 2005, Ferg launched Devoni Clothing, which designs and distributes high-end belts that have been worn by Chris Brown, Swizz Beatz and Diggy Simmons.

== Musical career ==
=== 2009–2012: Career beginnings with A$AP Mob ===
By 2009, he started developing an aggressive, trap style of hip-hop. "Trapping means hustling," he explained. "I went from painting to making clothes to rapping. I always put myself into everything I do one hundred percent. It doesn't matter what I'm working on. I want to perfect everything I do. Success is the only option. They call me 'Trap Lord' because my hustle game is impeccable." Friends since high school, A$AP Rocky recognized that Ferg had an "impeccable hustle game" and pushed Ferg to continue rapping as much as possible. They later joined the hip hop collective A$AP Mob, from which they both adopted their respective monikers. Since 2010, they collaborated on various songs such as "Get High," "Kissin' Pink" and "Ghetto Symphony", the latter being from Rocky's chart-topping major label debut, Long. Live. A$AP (2013).

=== 2012–2014: Trap Lord ===
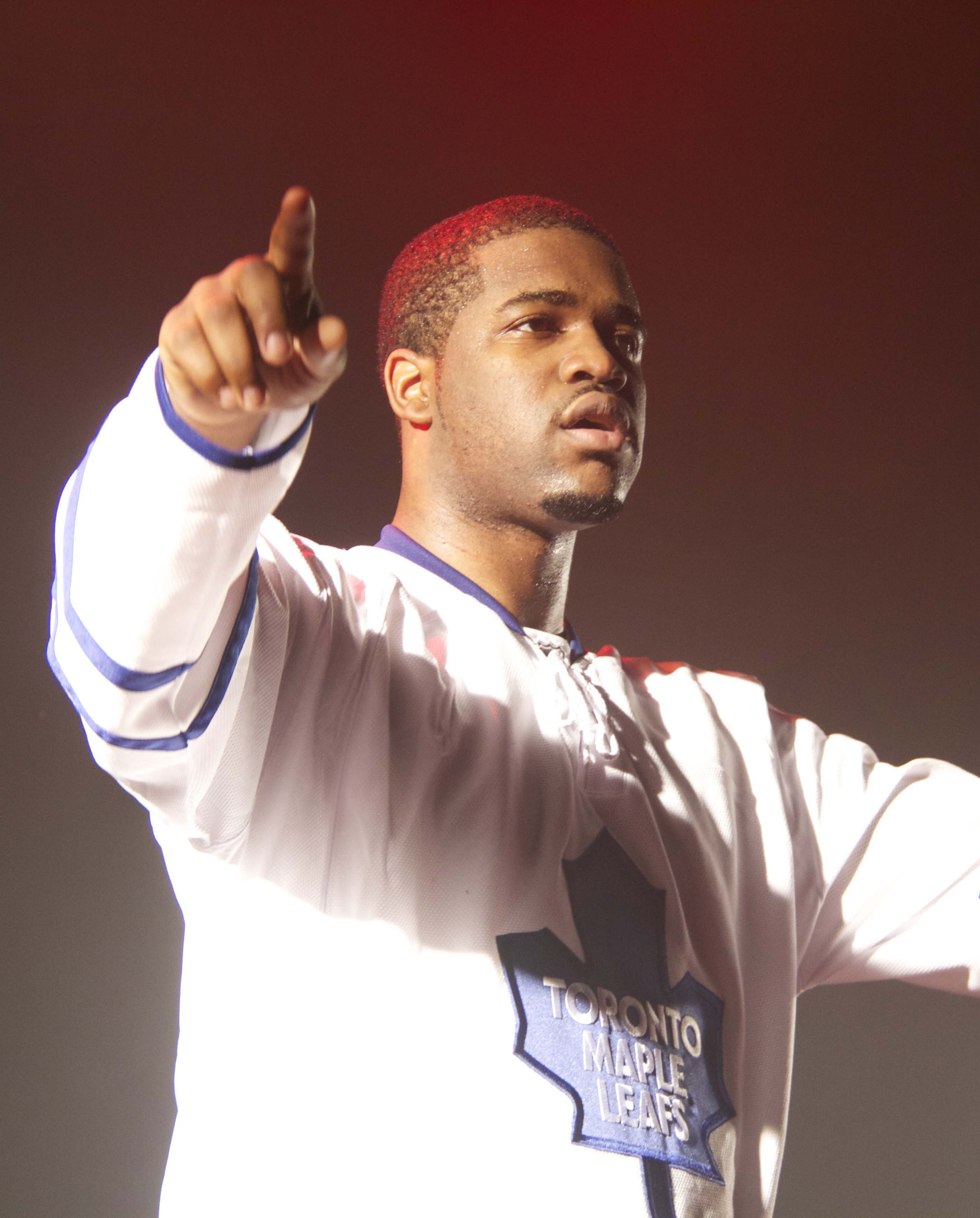
Ferguson performing in 2013 at The Opera House in Toronto

Ferg's debut single "Work", produced by Chinza and Fly, appeared on the A$AP Mob mixtape Lords Never Worry, released on August 28, 2012. The song's music video quickly earned over 2 million online views and was dubbed one of the "50 Best Songs of 2012" by Complex Magazine. On January 10, 2013, he announced Trap Lord would be the title of his debut album. When speaking on his debut album Trap Lord, Ferg said: "I hope people take the good and the bad from what I've got to say, I've seen so much shit in my life. There were times I ducked bullets at a basketball game, and then I went to a fashion show. I've experienced depression. I've experienced triumph. I've experienced hate. I've experienced love. I learned how to be independent. I made it out of the hood, and now I want go to the top."

On January 10, 2013, it was announced that he signed a record deal with RCA Records and Polo Grounds. On May 14, 2013, the remix to "Work", featuring fellow American rappers A$AP Rocky, Schoolboy Q, French Montana and Trinidad James, was released to digital retailers. On June 2, 2013, while revealing Trap Lord would feature guest appearances from hip hop groups Bone Thugs-n-Harmony and Onyx, Ferg announced that the album would be released on August 20, 2013. The album debuted at number 9 on the Billboard 200 chart, with total album sales of 46,000 copies in the United States. On October 15, he was named "Rookie of the Year" at the 2013 BET Hip Hop Awards. However, he was not there to accept the award as he did not think he was going to win. In 2014, Ferg appeared as a featured artist on the track "Hands on Me" by Ariana Grande, from her second album My Everything. The album was released on August 22, 2014.

=== 2015–present: Always Strive and Prosper, Floor Seats II, and Darold ===
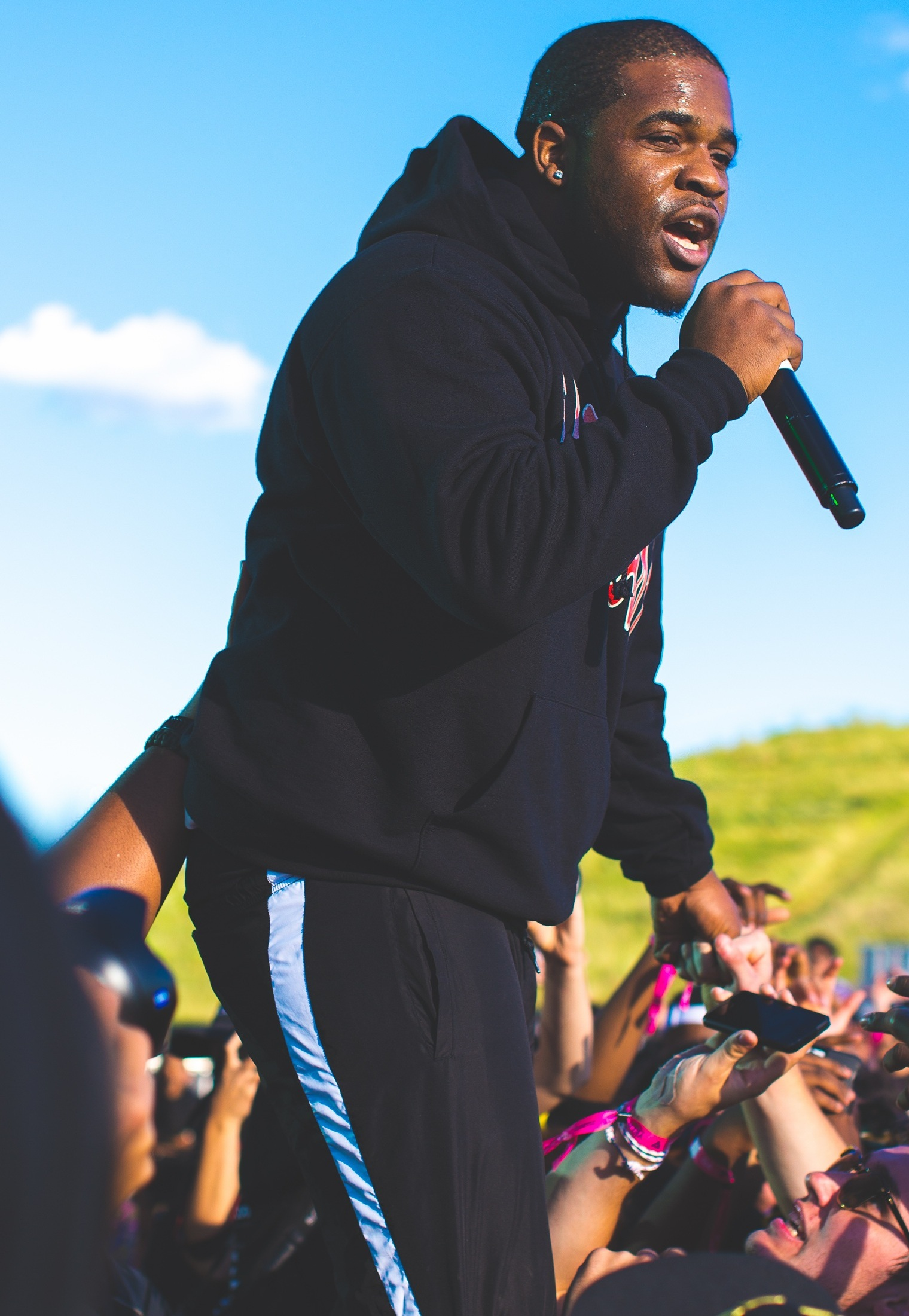
Ferguson performing at VELD festival in 2017

On February 25, 2015, Ferg released the video for the single "Dope Walk", a track from his Ferg Forever (2014) mixtape in which he coined a viral dance of the same name. Composed entirely of iPhone footage shot during New York Fashion Week, the video starred fashion model Cara Delevingne and featured cameos from a host of other celebrities, including Kris Jenner, Kanye West, Diddy, Alexander Wang, Russell Simmons, Justin Bieber, Beyoncé, Rihanna, A$AP Rocky, Jeremy Scott, Les Twins, and Haim. Ferg told Rolling Stone, "With 'Dope Walk' I wanted to bring back kids dancing and having fun again. That's how it used to be in Harlem. I remember everybody Harlem-shaking and 'Chicken Noodle Soup'-ing. Those were some of the most fun and memorable times in my life."

In late 2015, Ferg directed the music video for rapper Future's "Thought It Was a Drought". In an interview with The Source, Ferg stated that his "...new album is my best work yet. I put my all into it. I always tell people I really don't know what I'm going to do after this album, because I'm bearing so much truth with this album." On April 22, 2016, Ferg released his second studio album, which is titled Always Strive And Prosper. The album's first single, "New Level" featuring Future was certified gold by the RIAA on August 11, 2016. In 2016, he and Playboi Carti embarked on the "Turnt & Burnt" tour which had 23 stops. On June 9, 2017, Lost Kings released "Look at Us Now" as a single featuring Ferg and singer Ally Brooke. On June 13, 2017 he released the single, "Plain Jane" as the lead single from his third album, Still Striving.

Since 2015, Ferg is accompanied on tour by his DJ TJ Mizell, who is the son of the legendary Jam Master Jay.

In 2018, Ferg appeared in a video ad for Tiffany's with Elle Fanning remixing "Moon River" and later that year, he also narrated the Adidas World Cup advert 'Creativity is the Answer'. He released his Floor Seats EP on August 16, 2019.

In 2020, Ferg, along with musician Matt Sweeney, he appeared on the Run The Jewels track "A Few Words for the Firing Squad (Radiation)" on the latter's fourth studio album, RTJ4. He appeared at the end of "A Few Words..." on the hidden track, "Theme Song", providing his voice with the refrain "Yankee and the Brave".

Ferg released his fifth album, Floor Seats II, on September 25, 2020. It includes collaborations with Marilyn Manson, Dennis Rodman, and Mulatto, among others.

In October 2021, Ferg announced that he would be dropping the "A$AP" from his name and would henceforth be known simply as FERG for his solo career. Roc Nation clarified, "Ferg is very much still part of the Mob, and is A$AP Ferg within A$AP Mob... Ferg as an individual artist and with his solo career is Ferg". His first single under the new moniker, "MDMX," was released in May 2024.

Ferg released his sixth album Darold, on November 8, 2024. The album features artists such as Future, Denzel Curry, Mike Will Made It, and Mary J. Blige.

In January 2026, rap group The Scythe was formed, featuring Ferg, Denzel Curry, TiaCorine, Bktherula, and Key Nyata as members. The group's debut album, Strictly 4 the Scythe, was released on March 6, 2026, receiving mixed-to-positive reviews from music critics.

== Discography ==
Studio albums

- Trap Lord (2013)
- Always Strive and Prosper (2016)
- Darold (2024)

== Filmography ==
Film and television roles
Year	Title	Role	Notes	Ref.
2016	Animals	Bodega Cat 1 (voice)	Episode: "Flies"	
2018	Sugar	Himself	Episode: "A$AP Ferg drops in on a deserving NYC public school teacher."	
2019	Goldie	Tiny		
2020	The Eric Andre Show	Himself	Episode: "The A$AP Ferg Show"	
2021	Nailed It!	Himself	Episode: "Can't Believe It's Cake!"	
2021	Godfather of Harlem	Reggie	Episode: "Ten Harlem"	

== Awards and nominations ==
Year	Awards	Nominated work	Award	Result
2013	BET Hip Hop Awards	—N/a	Rookie of the Year	Won
2013	BET Hip Hop Awards	—N/a	Video Director of the Year	Nominated

== See also ==
- List of people from Harlem
