= 2022 in hip-hop =

This article summarizes the events, album releases, and album release dates in hip-hop for the year 2022.

== Events ==
=== January ===
- On January 1, Kodak Black was arrested in Pompano Beach, Florida, on trespassing charges.
- On January 2, Traxamillion died at the age of 42.
- On January 9, Earl Swavey was fatally shot at the age of 26.
- On January 11, Justin Johnson and Shondale Barnett, Young Dolph's killers, were arrested in Indiana; the same day, Cornelius Smith, another of Dolph's killers, was indicted on a first-degree murder charge.
- On January 13, CPO Boss Hogg died at the age of 52.
- On January 14, Sad Frosty died at the age of 24. That same day, rap group Brockhampton announced that they were splitting up after a performance at Coachella 2022.
- On January 26, NBA YoungBoy's Texas home was raided by SWAT team.

=== February ===
- On February 9, it was announced that Snoop Dogg would be the new owner of Death Row Records.
- On February 12, Blueface was arrested for gun possession in Hollywood, California. The same day, Kodak Black was shot after a fight at a Justin Bieber party in Los Angeles, California.
- On February 13, Dr. Dre, Eminem, Kendrick Lamar, Mary J. Blige, and Snoop Dogg performed at the Super Bowl LVI halftime show at SoFi Stadium in Inglewood, California. 50 Cent and Anderson .Paak also made appearances during the performance.
- On February 23, South African-native rapper, singer, and songwriter Riky Rick died by suicide at the age of 34.
- On February 26, American rapper Snootie Wild died after being shot in Houston, Texas, at the age of 36. The same day, True Bleeda was shot and killed in Baton Rouge, Louisiana.

=== March ===
- On March 5, Lil Bo Weep died at the age of 21.
- On March 6, DJ Dimplez, South African native hip hop DJ and producer died.

=== April ===
- On April 3, Baby Keem and Kendrick Lamar won the Best Rap Performance for their song "Family Ties" at the 64th Annual Grammy Awards. Kanye West won both Best Rap Song and Best Melodic Rap Performance for his two respective songs, "Jail" featuring Jay-Z, and "Hurricane" featuring The Weeknd and Lil Baby. Tyler, the Creator won the Grammy for Best Rap Album with Call Me If You Get Lost.
- On April 4, Tory Lanez was re-arrested for violating a court order regarding a 2020 shooting incident with Megan Thee Stallion.
- On April 17, DJ Kay Slay died at the age of 55 due to COVID-19 complications.
- On April 20, ASAP Rocky was arrested in Los Angeles, California, in connection to a shooting.

=== May ===
- On May 2, Rod Wave was arrested for battery in St. Petersburg, Florida.
- On May 9, Young Thug, Gunna, and 26 others associated with YSL were arrested for R.I.C.O. and conspiracy charges in Fulton County, Atlanta, Georgia.
- On May 13, Lil Keed died at the age of 24 due to kidney failure.
- On May 14, the Ukrainian rap group Kalush Orchestra won the Eurovision Song Contest 2022 with their song Stefania with 631 points in Turin.
- On May 29, Sidhu Moose Wala was shot and killed at the age of 28 in Mansa, Punjab, India.

=== June ===
- On June 2, the trial against Eric Holder Jr. for the murder of Nipsey Hussle began after Holder was arrested on April 2, 2019.
- On June 5, Atlanta-based rapper Trouble was shot and killed at the age of 34. It was also reported that Washington DC–based rapper 23 Rackz was also fatally shot.
- On June 14, XXL released their 2022 Freshman Class, including Nardo Wick, Doechii, SoFaygo, Babyface Ray, Kali, KayCyy, Cochise, Big30, KenTheMan, Big Scarr, Saucy Santana, and BabyTron.
- On June 22, Lil Tjay was shot in Edgewater, New Jersey.
- On June 29, R. Kelly was sentenced to 30 years in prison.

=== July ===
- On July 6, Eric Holder Jr. was convicted on first-degree murder charges for the murder of Nipsey Hussle after Holder’s trial had started on June 2.
- On July 27, JayDaYoungan was shot and killed at the age of 24.

=== August ===
- On August 1, The Pharcyde's long anticipated reunion on Fatlip's Torpor album gets spoiled by controversy over group naming rights.
- On August 6, Young Slo-Be was shot and killed at the age of 29.
- On August 15, Nipsey Hussle received a Hollywood Walk of Fame star posthumously, on what would have been his 37th birthday.
- On August 18, Dr. Dre and Jimmy Iovine opened a new high school in Leimert Park, California.

=== September ===
- On September 4, Pat Stay was fatally stabbed at the age of 36 in downtown Halifax, Nova Scotia.
- On September 12, PnB Rock was fatally shot at the age of 30 at a Roscoe's Chicken and Waffles restaurant in Los Angeles, California.
- On September 28, Coolio died from a heart attack at the age of 59.
- On September 29, Freddie Lee Trone was arrested for the murder of PnB Rock in Las Vegas, Nevada, along with 2 other people.

=== October ===
- On October 26, Tory Lanez was placed on house arrest after an altercation with August Alsina.

=== November ===
- On November 1, Takeoff was fatally shot in Houston, Texas, at the age of 28.
- On November 5, Eminem was inducted into the Rock and Roll Hall of Fame. He was presented by Dr. Dre, and had special guest appearances by Aerosmith lead vocalist Steven Tyler and Ed Sheeran during his performance.
- On November 15, Blueface was arrested for attempted murder.

=== December ===
- On December 12, the trial began for Tory Lanez against Megan Thee Stallion after allegedly shooting her in the foot in July 2020.
- On December 14, Gunna was released from prison after being arrested in May 2022.
- On December 22, Big Scarr died in his hometown of Memphis, Tennessee, at the age of 22 from a drug overdose.
- On December 23, Tory Lanez was convicted on all charges for the shooting of Megan Thee Stallion after his trial began on December 12. Lanez faces a maximum prison sentence of 22 years and eight months.

== Released albums ==
=== January ===
Day	Artist(s)	Album	Record label(s)	Entering chart position
1	FNKPMPN (Del the Funky Homosapien and Kool Keith)	Subatomic	Threshold Recordings	
6	Montana of 300	Rap God	Fly Guy Entertainment, E1 Music	
7	Gunna	DS4Ever	YSL Records, 300 Entertainment	Debuted at No. 1 on the Billboard 200
7	The Weeknd	Dawn FM	XO, Republic	Debuted at No. 2 on the Billboard 200
10	The Musalini and 9th Wonder	The Don & Eye	Jamla Records	
14	Cordae	From a Birds Eye View	Atlantic Records, Art@War, Hi-Level	Debuted at No. 13 on the Billboard 200
14	DigDat	Pain Built	Sony Music UK	
14	Earl Sweatshirt	Sick!	Tan Cressida, Warner Records	Debuted at No. 80 on the Billboard 200
14	Kota the Friend	Lyrics to Go, Vol. 3	FLTBYS	
14	Slim Thug	BIGslim	Hogg Life, SoSouth	
14	Token	Pink Is Better	Atlantic Records	
21	Che Noir	Food for Thought	DMG	
21	Iann Dior	On to Better Things	10K Projects	Debuted at No. 28 on the Billboard 200
21	King Iso	Get Well Soon	Strange Music, INgrooves	
21	Paper Route Empire	Long Live Young Dolph	Empire Distribution, Paper Route	Debuted at No. 44 on the Billboard 200
21	YoungBoy Never Broke Again	Colors	Never Broke Again, Atlantic Records	Debuted at No. 2 on the Billboard 200
21	Young T & Bugsey	Truth Be Told	Black Butter Records	
26	BlocBoy JB	Bacc 2 da Bloc	Foundation, Interscope Records	
26	Doe Boy	Oh Really	Epic Records, Freebandz	
27	Glaive	Old Dog, New Tricks	Interscope Records	
28	Babyface Ray	Face	Empire Distribution, Wavy Gang	Debuted at No. 31 on the Billboard 200
28	Dro Kenji	With or Without You	Internet Money Records, 10k Projects	
28	Kyle	It's Not So Bad	Self-released	
28	NLE Choppa	Me vs. Me	Warner Records	Debuted at No. 14 on the Billboard 200
28	PnB Rock	SoundCloud Daze	Atlantic Records	
30	Philthy Rich	Motivational Purpose	FOD	
31	Matt Ox	Year of the Ox	OX	

=== February ===
Day	Artist(s)	Album	Record label(s)	Entering chart position
4	2 Chainz	Dope Don't Sell Itself	T.R.U., Def Jam	Debuted at No. 23 on the Billboard 200
4	Beam	Alien	Epic Records, Be I Am	
4	Saba	Few Good Things	Pivot Gang LLC	
4	Smoke DZA and Real Bad Man	Mood Swings	Real Bad Man, RFC	
4	Upchurch	People's Champ	Holler Boy Records, Stonebaby Sounds	Debuted at No. 101 on the Billboard 200
4	Yo Gotti	CM10: Free Game	Collective Music Group, Inevitable Records, Interscope Records	Debuted at No. 3 on the Billboard 200
7	Kid Capri	The Love	No Kid'n Records	
11	Cousin Stizz	Just for You	Stizz Music	
11	Huskii	Antihero	Island Records Australia	Debuted at No. 1 on the ARIA Albums chart
11	Juicy J and Wiz Khalifa	Stoners Night	Taylor Gang, Rostrum Records, Trippy Music	
11	Snoop Dogg	BODR	Death Row Records	Debuted at No. 104 on the Billboard 200
11	$NOT	Ethereal	300 Entertainment	Debuted at No. 66 on the Billboard 200
11	Trae tha Truth	Truth Season: The United Streets of America	ABN, Empire	
11	Yungen	Passionate & Paranoid	Sony Music UK	
18	Big K.R.I.T.	Digital Roses Don't Die	BMG	
18	Calboy	Black Heart	Self-released	
18	Curren$y and The Alchemist	Continuance	Jet Life Recordings, ALC Records	Debuted at No. 200 on the Billboard 200
18	DC the Don	My Own Worst Enemy	Rostrum Records	
18	Haystak	Haywire	War Horse Entertainment	
18	Yeat	2 Alive	Field Trip Recordings, TwizzyRich, Geffen Records	Debuted at No. 6 on the Billboard 200
22	Boosie Badazz	Heartfelt	Bad Azz Music, Connect Music	
22	KRS-One	I M A M C R U 1 2	Self-released	
23	Kanye West	Donda 2	Self-released	
25	Ace Hood	M.I.N.D.	Hood Nation, Empire	
25	Central Cee	23	Self-released	Debuted at No. 1 on the UK Albums Chart
25	Conway the Machine	God Don't Make Mistakes	Griselda Records, Shady Records, Interscope Records, Drumwork	Debuted at No. 175 on the Billboard 200
25	EarthGang	Ghetto Gods	Dreamville, Interscope Records, Spillage Village	Debuted at No. 114 on the Billboard 200
25	Kodak Black	Back for Everything	Dollaz N Dealz, Sniper Gang, Atlantic Records	Debuted at No. 2 on the Billboard 200

=== March ===
Day	Artist(s)	Album	Record label(s)	Entering chart position
3	The Cool Kids	Before Shit Got Weird	Sounds Like Fun	
4	BabyTron	Megatron	The Hip Hop Lab Records, Empire	
4	DaBaby and YoungBoy Never Broke Again	Better than You	South Coast Music Group, Interscope, Atlantic	Debuted at No. 10 on the Billboard 200
4	King Von	What It Means to Be King	Only The Family, Empire	Debuted at No. 2 on the Billboard 200
4	Kojey Radical	Reason to Smile	Asylum	Debuted at No. 11 on the UK Albums Chart
4	Smoke DZA, 183rd, and Nym Lo	Driplomatic Immunity	RFC Music Group	
4	Tom MacDonald and Adam Calhoun	The Brave	Self-released	Debuted at No. 14 on the Billboard 200
8	Mike Dimes	In Dimes We Trust	Camp Billy Recordings, Encore	
11	Benny the Butcher	Tana Talk 4	Black Soprano Family, Griselda, Empire	Debuted at No. 22 on the Billboard 200
11	Bun B and Cory Mo	Mo Trill	C-Mozart Muzik, II Trill Enterprises	
11	Dave East	How Did I Get Here?	From the Dirt	
11	Elzhi	Zhigeist	Nature Sounds	
11	Fly Anakin	Frank	Lex Records	
11	Ho99o9	SKIN	A DTA, Elektra	
11	KXNG Crooked and Joell Ortiz	Rise & Fall of Slaughterhouse	Hitmaker Music Group	Debuted at No. 152 on the Billboard 200
11	Lil Durk	7220	Only The Family, Alamo Records	Debuted at No. 1 on the Billboard 200
11	Tobi Lou	Non-Perishable	Artclub, Empire	
11	Warhol.SS	Where's Warhol 2	Create Music Group	
17	Lil' Flip	La Clover Nostra II: The Mob Lives On	Music Access, Inc.	
18	ArrDee	Pier Pressure	Island Records, Universal	Debuted at No. 2 on the UK Albums Chart
18	Cypress Hill	Back in Black	BMG	
20	Trae tha Truth	Life n Pain	ABN, Empire	
22	Phife Dawg	Forever	Smokin' Needles, AWAL	
23	Loe Shimmy	Z End	Self-released	
25	Blade Brown and K-Trap	Joints	Thousand8, BxB Ent.	Debuted at No. 18 on the UK Albums Chart
25	Buddy	Superghetto	RCA Records	
25	Denzel Curry	Melt My Eyez See Your Future	Loma Vista, PH	Debuted at No. 51 on the Billboard 200
25	Larry June and Jay Worthy	2 P'z In A Pod	GDF Records, The Freeminded Records, Empire	
25	Latto	777	RCA, Streamcut	Debuted at No. 15 on the Billboard 200
25	Locksmith	The Lock Sessions, Vol. 3	Landmark Entertainment	
25	Nigo	I Know Nigo!	Victor Victor	Debuted at No. 13 on the Billboard 200
31	Dreamville	D-Day: A Gangsta Grillz Mixtape	Dreamville Records, Interscope Records	Debuted at No. 11 on the Billboard 200
31	Pete Rock	PeteStrumentals 4	Soul Brother Records, Vinyl Digital	
31	Sadistik and Kno	Bring Me Back When the World Is Cured	Knomercy Productions	

=== April ===
Day	Artist(s)	Album	Record label(s)	Entering chart position
1	Gawne & Atlus	Waves	PsychTune Records	
1	Lil Moshpit	AAA	H1ghr Music	
1	Stevie Stone	Raising the Bar	Ahdasee Records	
1	Yeat	2 Alive (Geek Pack)	Geffen Records	
8	42 Dugg and EST Gee	Last Ones Left	CMG, Warlike, Interscope	Debuted at No. 7 on the Billboard 200
8	Billy Woods	Aethiopes	Backwoodz Studioz	
8	Coi Leray	Trendsetter	1801, Republic Records	Debuted at No. 89 on the Billboard 200
8	Fivio Foreign	B.I.B.L.E.	Columbia Records, RichFish	Debuted at No. 9 on the Billboard 200
8	Girl Talk, Wiz Khalifa, Big K.R.I.T., and Smoke DZA	Full Court Press	Taylor Gang, Asylum Records	
8	Paul Wall and Termanology	Start 2 Finish	Perfect Time Music Group	
8	Tom the Mail Man	Sunset Visionary, Vol. 2	The Delivery Crew, AWAL	
8	Triple One	A Dangerous Method Vol. 1	Self-released	
8	Vince Staples	Ramona Park Broke My Heart	Motown, Blacksmith	Debuted at No. 21 on the Billboard 200
8	Yung Lean	Stardust	World Affairs	
15	Bas	[Bump] Pick Me Up	Dreamville, Interscope	
15	Digga D	Noughty by Nature	CGM	Debuted at No. 1 on the UK Albums Chart
15	Fredo Bang	Two-Face Bang 2	Se Lavi, Def Jam	Debuted at No. 119 on the Billboard 200
15	Tee Grizzley	Half Tee Half Beast	300 Entertainment	Debuted at No. 116 on the Billboard 200
15	Yungeen Ace	All On Me	Cinematic Music Group, ATK	
20	Lil' Flip and Tum Tum	Made in Texas 2	Music Access, Inc.	
20	Redveil	Learn 2 Swim	Self-released	
22	Blxst	Before You Go	Red Bull, Evgle	Debuted at No. 90 on the Billboard 200
22	Czarface	Czarmageddon!	Silver Age	Debuted at No. 178 on the Billboard 200
22	Pusha T	It's Almost Dry	GOOD Music, Def Jam	Debuted at No. 1 on the Billboard 200
22	SosMula	2 High 2 Die	Hikari-Ultra, Republic Records	
28	Tanna Leone	Sleepy Soldier	PGLang, Def Jam	
29	Action Bronson	Cocodrillo Turbo	Loma Vista	
29	Autumn!	Antagonist!	Victor Victor Worldwide, Casablanca	
29	Bones and grayera	Withered	TeamSESH	
29	Fatlip and Blu	Live From The End of The World, Vol. 1 Demos	GBA	
29	Future	I Never Liked You	Freebandz, Epic Records	Debuted at No. 1 on the Billboard 200
29	Lil Poppa	Under Investigation 3	CMG, Interscope Records	Debuted at No. 194 on the Billboard 200
29	MC Eiht	Revolution in Progress	Blue Stamp, Year Round	
29	NoCap	Mr. Crawford	Never Broke Again, Atlantic	Debuted at No. 8 on the Billboard 200
29	Nyck Caution and Charlie Heat	Friend of the Family	Self-released	
29	Pooh Shiesty	Shiesty Season: Certified	Atlantic, 1017	

=== May ===
Day	Artist(s)	Album	Record label(s)	Entering chart position
3	Black Star	No Fear of Time	Self-released	
6	IDK	Simple.	Clue, Warner	
6	Jack Harlow	Come Home the Kids Miss You	Generation Now, Atlantic Records	Debuted at No. 3 on the Billboard 200
6	Knucks	Alpha Place	NoDaysOff	Debuted at No. 3 on the UK Albums Chart
6	Method Man	Meth Lab Season 3: The Rehab	Hanz On Music Entertainment, ONErpm	
6	Octavian	Alpha	Sex Am Club	
12	Blac Youngsta	4Life	Heavy Camp, Create Music Group	
13	Fresco Trey	Heartbreak Diaries 2	Warner Records	
13	Horrorshow	Good Problems	Elefant Traks	
13	Kendrick Lamar	Mr. Morale & the Big Steppers	PGLang, Top Dawg Entertainment, Aftermath, Interscope	Debuted at No. 1 on the Billboard 200
13	Quelle Chris	Deathfame	Mello Music Group	
13	They Hate Change	Finally, New	Jagjaguwar	
13	18	Marlon Craft	While We're Here	Homecourt
13	yvngxchris	Virality	Columbia Records	
20	Boldy James and Real Bad Man	Killing Nothing	Real Bad Man Records	
20	Lil Gnar	Die Bout It	Gnarcotic Records, Create Music Group	
20	M Huncho	Chasing Euphoria	Island Records	Debuted at No. 5 on the UK Albums Chart
20	Stunna 4 Vegas	Rae Rae’s Son	Billion Dollar Baby, Interscope	
20	Snoop Dogg	Metaverse: The NFT Drop, Vol. 1	Real Talk Entertainment	
27	Jeshi	Universal Credit	Because Music	
27	Joey Purp and Kami	You and the Money	YATM, OON	
27	Nafe Smallz	Legacy	Ozone Music	Debuted at No. 52 on the UK Albums Chart
27	Z-Ro	Pressure	1 Deep Entertainment, Empire	

=== June ===
Day	Artist(s)	Album	Record label(s)	Entering chart position
3	070 Shake	You Can't Kill Me	GOOD, Def Jam	
3	KayCyy	Get Used To It	BuVision, Columbia Records	
3	MC Ren	Osiris	Boomdocz Productions	
3	Post Malone	Twelve Carat Toothache	Republic Records	Debuted at No. 2 on the Billboard 200
3	Vory	Lost Souls	UMG Recordings	
10	Curren$y and Fuse	Spring Clean 2	Jet Life Recordings	
10	Father	Young Hot Ebony 2	Awful Records	
10	XXXTentacion	Look at Me: The Album	Bad Vibes Forever	Debuted at No. 24 on the Billboard 200
15	J. Stone	The Definition of Sacrifice	25/8 No Breaks, All Money In No Money Out	
17	Drake	Honestly, Nevermind	OVO Sound, Republic Records	Debuted at No. 1 on the Billboard 200
17	Duke Deuce	Crunkstar	Quality Control Music, Motown Records	
17	Gucci Mane and 1017	So Icy Gang: The ReUp	1017 Records, Atlantic Records	Debuted at No. 39 on the Billboard 200
17	Kevin Gates	Khaza	Bread Winners' Association, Atlantic	Debuted at No. 8 on the Billboard 200
17	Logic	Vinyl Days	Def Jam	Debuted at No. 12 on the Billboard 200
17	Snoop Dogg	Snoop Dogg Presents Death Row Summer 2022	Death Row	
17	Westside Boogie	More Black Superheroes	LVRN, Shady, Interscope	
24	Chris Brown	Breezy	CBE, RCA Records	Debuted at No. 4 on the Billboard 200
24	Cochise	The Inspection	Columbia Records	
24	French Montana and Harry Fraud	Montega	Coke Boys Records	Debuted at No. 46 on the Billboard 200
24	Juicy J and Pi'erre Bourne	Space Age Pimpin’	Trippy Music	
24	Lupe Fiasco	Drill Music in Zion	1st and 15th, Thirty Tigers	
24	Money Man	Big Money	Black Circle, Empire	Debuted at No. 95 on the Billboard 200
30	Lil Mabu	Double M's	Self-released	

=== July ===
Day	Artist(s)	Album	Record label(s)	Entering chart position
1	E.D.I. Mean and Yhung T.O.	Souljahz 2 Generalz	O4L Digital	
1	Kid Buu	Blind for Love 4: A Perfect Love Letter	Valentine Enterprise	
1	Moor Mother	Jazz Codes	Anti-	
8	Brent Faiyaz	Wasteland	Lost Kids, Venice, Stem	Debuted at No. 2 on the Billboard 200
8	Ken Carson	X	Opium, Interscope Records	Debuted at No. 115 on the Billboard 200
8	Kid Cudi	The Boy Who Flew to the Moon, Vol. 1	Wicked Awesome, Republic Records	Debuted at No. 83 on the Billboard 200
8	Kota the Friend	Memo	Venice Innovation Labs	
8	Tasman Keith	A Colour Undone	AWAL	
8	Westside Gunn	Peace"Fly"God	Griselda Records	
10	Baby Bash and Paul Wall	The Legalizers 3: Plant Based	Paul Wall Music, Bashtown Music Group	
15	CMG The Label	Gangsta Art	CMG, Interscope Records	Debuted at No. 11 on the Billboard 200
15	DJ Premier	Hip Hop 50: Vol. 1	Mass Appeal Records	
15	Joey Cool	The Chairman of the Board	Strange Music, INgrooves	
15	Lizzo	Special	Nice Life, Atlantic Records	Debuted at No. 2 on the Billboard 200
15	Lloyd Banks	The Course of the Inevitable 2	Money By Any Means, Empire	
15	Rexx Life Raj	The Blue Hour	Empire	
15	Rowdy Rebel	Rebel vs. Rowdy	Epic Records	
15	Sheff G	From the Can	Winners Circle Entertainment, RCA Records	
20	Flo Milli	You Still Here, Ho?	RCA Records	
21	Icewear Vezzo	Rich Off Pints 3	Iced Up Records	
22	Joey Bada$$	2000	Pro Era, Cinematic, Columbia	Debuted at No. 25 on the Billboard 200
22	Lil Uzi Vert	Red and White	Generation Now, Atlantic Records	Debuted at No. 23 on the Billboard 200
22	Mozzy	Survivor's Guilt	Collective Music Group, Interscope Records	Debuted at No. 40 on the Billboard 200
22	Rico Nasty	Las Ruinas	Sugar Trap, Atlantic Records	
22	RZA	Bobby Digital and the Pit of Snakes	36 Chambers, MNRK Records	
22	The Koreatown Oddity	IsThisForReal?	Stones Throw Records	
29	Fatlip	Torpor	Labcabin Records	
29	Bankroll Freddie	From Trap to Rap 2	Quality Control Music, Motown	
29	Beyoncé	Renaissance	Columbia, Parkwood	Debuted at No. 1 on the Billboard 200
29	Domo Genesis	Intros, Outros & Interludes	Bigger Picture Recordings	
29	Fenix Flexin	Fenix Flexin Vol. 2	Atlantic Records	
29	Hotboii	Blinded by Death	Rebel, Geffen	Debuted at No. 89 on the Billboard 200
29	K Camp	Vibe Forever	Rare Sounds, Interscope Records	
29	$uicideboy$	Sing Me a Lullaby, My Sweet Temptation	G59	Debuted at No. 7 on the Billboard 200
29	Wiz Khalifa	Multiverse	Taylor Gang, Asylum	
29	Yella Beezy	Bad Azz Yella Boy	Profit Music Group	

=== August ===
Day	Artist(s)	Album	Record label(s)	Entering chart position
5	Bobby Shmurda	Bodboy	Self-released	
5	Eminem	Curtain Call 2	Shady Records, Aftermath Entertainment, Interscope Records	Debuted at No. 6 on the Billboard 200
5	Gawne	Ghosts	Self-released	
5	Kalan.FrFr	222	Roc Nation	
5	Ouija Macc	Stalewind	Chapter 17 Records, Psychopathic Records	
5	StaySolidRocky	Why So Larceny?	Self-released	
5	YoungBoy Never Broke Again	The Last Slimeto	Atlantic, Never Broke Again	Debuted at No. 2 on the Billboard 200
8	Young Nudy	EA Monster	RCA Records	Debuted at No. 151 on the Billboard 200
10	Chris Patrick	X-Files	CXR, Good Partners	
12	Danger Mouse and Black Thought	Cheat Codes	BMG	Debuted at No. 43 on the Billboard 200
12	Destroy Lonely	No Stylist	Opium	Debuted at No. 91 on the Billboard 200
12	Freddie Dredd	Freddie's Inferno	RCA Records, Sony Music Entertainment	
12	The Game	Drillmatic – Heart vs. Mind	100 Entertainment, Virgin Records	Debuted at No. 12 on the Billboard 200
12	Megan Thee Stallion	Traumazine	300, 1501 Certified Entertainment, Warner Records	Debuted at No. 4 on the Billboard 200
12	Peezy	Only Built 4 Diamond Links	Boyz Entertainment, Empire Distribution	Debuted at No. 123 on the Billboard 200
12	Rod Wave	Beautiful Mind	Alamo Records, Sony Music Entertainment	Debuted at No. 1 on the Billboard 200
12	Royce da 5'9"	The Heaven Experience, Vol. 1	Heaven Studios, eOne	
12	The Musalini and Khrysis	Pure Izm	Jamla Records, Empire Distribution	
17	Kenny Mason	Pup Pack	Self-released	
19	600breezy	Retaliation	600Cartel, Empire Distribution	
19	Aitch	Close to Home	Infinitum Records	Debuted at No. 2 on the UK Albums Chart
19	B.o.B	Better Than Drugs	Bobby Ray Music	
19	Diamond D	The Rear View	Dymond Mine Records	
19	Internet Money	We All We Got	Internet Money, TenThousand Projects	
19	Larry June	Spaceships on the Blade	The Freeminded Records, Empire Distribution	Debuted at No. 39 on the Billboard 200
19	OMB Peezy and DJ Drama	Misguided	300 Entertainment	
19	YBN Nahmir	Faster Car Music	Def Jam Records, Universal Music Group	
19	Kurupt	7Ps tha Gotti Way	Penagon, Fat Beats	
20	Kodak Black	Closure	Self-released	
26	88GLAM	Close To Heaven Far From God	88GLAM	
26	Autumn!	Golden Child, Chapter 2	Victor Victor Worldwide, Universal Music Group	
26	Declaime and Madlib	In the Beginning Vol. 2	Someothaship Connection, Fat Beats Records	
26	DJ Khaled	God Did	We The Best Music, Epic Records, Roc Nation	Debuted at No. 1 on the Billboard 200
26	Dro Kenji	Anywhere But Here	Internet Money Records, TenThousand Projects	
26	JID	The Forever Story	Dreamville, Interscope, Spillage Village	Debuted at No. 12 on the Billboard 200
26	Lil' Flip	The Art of Freestyle 3	Wreckshop Records, Clover G, Music Access, Inc.	
26	Mach-Hommy and Tha God Fahim	Dollar Menu 4	Self-released	
26	Meechy Darko	Gothic Luxury	Loma Vista Recordings	
26	Meyhem Lauren and Daringer	Black Vladimir	Black Truffle Enterprises	
26	MoneyMarr	Virgoat	GS, Empire Distribution	
26	Nicki Minaj	Queen Radio: Volume 1	Young Money Entertainment, Republic Records	Debuted at No. 10 on the Billboard 200
26	Real Boston Richey	Public Housing	Open Shift Distribution	Debuted at No. 60 on the Billboard 200
26	Roc Marciano and The Alchemist	The Elephant Man’s Bones	Pimpire, ALC Records	
26	Sauce Walka	Sauce Beach Florida	The Sauce Familia	
27	Peanuts	Peanuts	Self-released	
29	iLoveMakonnen	Summer '22	Self-released	
31	Kenny Beats	Louie	XL Recordings	

=== September ===
Day	Artist(s)	Album	Record label(s)	Entering chart position
2	Dusty Locane	Rollin N Controllin	95MM, Empire Distribution	
2	Pi'erre Bourne	Good Movie	SossHouse, Interscope Records	
2	Sha EK	Face of the What	Defiant Records, Warner Records	Debuted at No. 189 on the Billboard 200
2	Snoop Dogg	Metaverse: The NFT Drop, Vol. 2	Real Talk Entertainment	
2	Wombat	What Death Tastes Like	ADA, Warner Music Australia	Debuted at No. 12 on the ARIA Albums Chart
7	YoungBoy Never Broke Again	Realer 2	Never Broke Again, Atlantic Records	Debuted at No. 71 on the Billboard 200
9	Black Soprano Family	Long Live DJ Shay	Black Soprano Family	
9	Cappadonna and Stu Bangas	3rd Chamber Grail Bars	Fat Beats Distribution	
9	Lil Jairmy	GasGod 2	300 Entertainment	
9	Nav	Demons Protected by Angels	XO Records, Republic Records	Debuted at No. 2 on the Billboard 200
9	Sampa the Great	As Above, So Below	Loma Vista Recordings	Debuted at No. 12 on the ARIA Albums Chart
9	TiaCorine	I Can't Wait	South Coast	
9	Yeat	Lyfe	Twizzy Records, Geffen Records, Interscope Records	Debuted at No. 10 on the Billboard 200
16	EST Gee	I Never Felt Nun	Collective Music Group, Interscope Records	Debuted at No. 8 on the Billboard 200
16	K.O	Skhanda Republic 3	Skhanda World, Sony Music	
16	Ka	Languish Arts	Iron Works	
16	Ka	Woeful Studies	Iron Works	
16	Kashdami	World Damination	Mercury Records, Republic Records	
16	KXNG Crooked and Joell Ortiz	Harbor City Season One	Hitmaker Music Group, Hitmaker Distribution	
16	Symba and DJ Drama	Results Take Time	Starr Island, Atlantic Records	
17	Curren$y	The 8 Ball Jacket	Self-released	
23	BigWalkDog	Trick City	1017 Records, Atlantic Records	Debuted at No. 125 on the Billboard 200
23	Cam'ron and A-Trak	U Wasn't There	Federal Reserve, Empire Distribution	
23	DaBaby	Baby on Baby 2	Billion Dollar Baby, Interscope Records	Debuted at No. 34 on the Billboard 200
23	D-Block Europe	Lap 5	Self-released	Debuted at No. 2 on the UK Albums Chart
23	DreamDoll	Life In Plastic 3	District 18 Entertainment, Warner Records	
23	Lakeyah	No Pressure (Pt. 2)	Quality Control Music, Motown Records	
23	Lucki	Flawless Like Me	Empire	Debuted at No. 12 on the Billboard 200
28	Kenny Mason	Ruffs	RCA Records	
30	Baby Tate	Mani/Pedi	Warner Records	
30	BIG30	Last Man Standing	Bread Gang, N-Less, Interscope Records	Debuted at No. 104 on the Billboard 200
30	Billy Woods	Church	Backwoodz Studioz	
30	Boldy James and Nicholas Craven	Fair Exchange No Robbery	Nicholas Craven Productions	
30	DDG	It's Not Me It's You	Epic Records, Sony Music	Debuted at No. 133 on the Billboard 200
30	Drakeo the Ruler	Keep The Truth Alive	Stinc Team, Empire Distribution	
30	Freddie Gibbs	Soul Sold Separately	ESGN, Warner Records	Debuted at No. 11 on the Billboard 200
30	Kankan	Way2Geeked	Empire Distribution	
30	Kid Cudi	Entergalactic	Republic Records, Wicked Awesome	Debuted at No. 13 on the Billboard 200
30	Prodigy	The Hegelian Dialectic 2: The Book of Heroine	Infamous Records	
30	Rome Streetz	Kiss the Ring	Griselda Records	
30	Tory Lanez	Sorry 4 What	One Umbrella Records	Debuted at No. 10 on the Billboard 200
30	Twiztid	Songs of Samhain, Vol. 3: Cult of Night	Majik Ninja Entertainment	
30	UnoTheActivist	Limbus 3	Self-released	
30	YG	I Got Issues	4Hunnid Records, Def Jam	Debuted at No. 18 on the Billboard 200

=== October ===
Day	Artist(s)	Album	Record label(s)	Entering chart position
4	Grip	5 and a F*** You	Stray Society	
4	Rich Homie Quan	Family & Mula	Rich Homie Entertainment	
7	Adam Calhoun	Country Rap Tunes	ACal	
7	Flohio	Out of Heart	AWAL	
7	G Herbo	Survivor's Remorse (Side A)	Machine Entertainment Group, Republic Records	Debuted at No. 9 on the Billboard 200
7	Open Mike Eagle	Component System with the Auto Reverse	Auto Reverse Records	
7	Quavo and Takeoff	Only Built for Infinity Links	Quality Control Music, Capitol Records, Motown Records, YRN The Label	Debuted at No. 7 on the Billboard 200
7	Toosii	Boys Don't Cry	SCMG, Capitol Records	
7	YoungBoy Never Broke Again	3800 Degrees	Never Broke Again, Atlantic Records	Debuted at No. 12 on the Billboard 200
7	Cormega	The Realness II	Viper Records	
10	G Herbo	Survivor's Remorse (Side B)	Machine Entertainment Group, Republic Records	
14	Clymax and K-Rino	Concrete Thoughts	Clymax Entertainment	
14	Smoke DZA	10,000 Hrs	RFC Music Group	
14	Lil Baby	It's Only Me	4PF, Wolfpack, Quality Control, Motown, Capitol	Debuted at No. 1 on the Billboard 200
14	Mavi	Laughing so Hard, it Hurts	Mavi 4 Mayor Music, UnitedMasters	
14	Mykki Blanco	Stay Close to Music	Self-released	
14	Rimzee	Cold Feet	Self-released	Debuted at No. 11 on the UK Albums Chart
14	Tee Grizzley	Chapters of the Trenches	Grizzley Gang, 300 Entertainment	Debuted at No. 124 on the Billboard 200
17	Gucci Mane	So Icy Boyz 22	1017 Records, Atlantic Records	
18	Curren$y	8 Ball Jacket 2	Self-released	
20	Snoop Dogg and DJ Drama	I Still Got It	Death Row Records	
20	Superstar Pride	5lbs of Pleasure	UnitedMaster LLC	Debuted at No. 195 on the Billboard 200
21	A-Reece	Deadlines: Free P2	Revenge Club Records	
21	Armani Caesar	The Liz 2	Griselda Records	
21	bbno$	bag or die	Self-released	
21	Duckwrth	Chrome Bull	SuperGood, The Blind Youth	
21	Fredo Bang	UNLV	Se Lavi Productions, Def Jam Records	
21	Jeezy and DJ Drama	Snofall	Def Jam Recordings	Debuted at No. 9 on the Billboard 200
21	Lil Mosey	Uni	Interscope Records	
21	Loyle Carner	Hugo	EMI Records	Debuted at No. 3 on the UK Albums Chart
21	Snow Tha Product	To Anywhere	Snow tha Product	
21	YoungBoy Never Broke Again	Ma' I Got a Family	Never Broke Again	Debuted at No. 7 on the Billboard 200
26	454	Fast Trax 3	Math, Honeymoon	
26	Che Noir	The Last Remnants	DMG	
28	BabyTron	Bin Reaper 3: Old Testament	The Hip Hop Lab Records, Empire Distribution	Debuted at No. 69 on the Billboard 200
28	Berner	From Seed to Sale	Bern One Entertainment	Debuted at No. 20 on the Billboard 200
28	Bobby Shmurda and lougotcash	ShmurdaGotcash	GS9 Records	
28	Cakes da Killa	Svengali	Young Art Records	
28	Duke Deuce	Memphis Massacre III	Quality Control Music, Motown	
28	Taylor Gang	G Rage	Taylor Gang, Stem	
28	Kodak Black	Kutthroat Bill: Vol. 1	Atlantic Records	Debuted at No. 8 on the Billboard 200
28	Lancey Foux	Life in Hell	PSYKE, Human Re Sources	
28	Marlowe (L'Orange and Solemn Brigham)	Marlowe 3	Mello Music Group	
28	Money Man	Blackout	Empire	Debuted at No. 168 on the Billboard 200
28	Never Broke Again	Nightmare on 38th St	Never Broke Again, Motown Records	
28	Raw Youngin	386 Landlord	808 Mafia	
28	Sheek Louch	Gorillaween 4	D-Block Records	
28	Smino	Luv 4 Rent	Zero Fatigue, Motown Records	Debuted at No. 50 on the Billboard 200
28	Westside Gunn	Hitler Wears Hermes 10	Griselda Records, Empire Distribution	Debuted at No. 183 on the Billboard 200
28	Young Noble	Fire in My Soul (An Acoustic Experience)	Outlaw Recordz	
28	Your Old Droog	The Yodfather	Droog Recordings	
28	Yung Gravy	Marvelous	Republic Records	Debuted at No. 99 on the Billboard 200
31	Bones	2MillionBlunts	TeamSESH, Empire Distribution	
31	Dusty Locane	Nightmare On Da Fifth	95MM, Empire Records	
31	Lil Shine	Losing Myself	Self-released	

=== November ===
Day	Artist(s)	Album	Record label(s)	Entering chart position
4	3Breezy	Heart on Display	Capitol Records, Universal Music	
4	9th Wonder	Zion VII	Jamla Records	
4	Bobby Sessions	I’d Rather Keep It to Myself	Def Jam Recordings	
4	Boldy James and Futurewave	Mr. Ten08	WavGodMusic, FxckRxp	
4	Drake and 21 Savage	Her Loss	OVO Sound, Slaughter Gang, Epic Records	Debuted at No. 1 on the Billboard 200
4	Iayze	Monarch 2: No Auto	Simple Stupid Records, Geffen Records	
4	Lecrae	Church Clothes 4	Reach Records	
4	Lil Double 0	Walk Down World	Freebandz, Open Shift Distribution	Debuted at No. 175 on the Billboard 200
4	Lil Poppa	Heavy Is the Head	Rule #1, Interscope Records	
4	R.A.P. Ferreira	5 to the Eye with Stars	Ruby Yacht	
4	Sha EK	O to the G	Defiant Records, Warner Records	
4	Slim 400	Hol'Upppp 4Eva	Ice Wata, Empire Distribution	
4	Yhung T.O.	Rather Rich Than Famous	R3al Boii Records	
11	Famous Dex	Lost on Saturn	Rich Forever Music	
11	GloRilla	Anyways, Life's Great	Collective Music Group, Interscope Records	Debuted at No. 11 on the Billboard 200
11	Headie One	No Borders: European Compilation Project	Relentless Records, Sony Music UK	
11	Homeboy Sandman	Still Champion	Mello Music Group	
11	Lil' Flip	Fondren Flip	Clover G, Music Access, Inc.	
11	Nas	King's Disease III	Mass Appeal Records	Debuted at No. 10 on the Billboard 200
11	Quadeca	I Didn't Mean to Haunt You	DeadAir Records, AWAL	
11	Run the Jewels	RTJ Cu4tro	Jewel Runners LLC, BMG Rights Management	
11	SleazyWorld Go	Where the Shooters Be	SleazyWorld, Island Records	Debuted at No. 151 on the Billboard 200
11	SoFaygo	Pink Heartz	Cactus Jack	
11	Toosii	Boys Don't Cry: Men Do	SCMG, Capitol Records	
11	Yung Bleu	Tantra	Moon Boy University, Empire Distribution	Debuted at No. 99 on the Billboard 200
15	Apollo Brown and Philmore Greene	Cost of Living	Mello Music Group	
15	$ilkMoney	I Don't Give a F**k About This Rap Shit, Imma Just Drop Until I Don't Feel Like It Anymore	DB$B Records	
17	Brockhampton	The Family	Question Everything, RCA Records	Debuted at No. 15 on the Billboard 200
17	Key Glock	Pre5l	Paper Route Empire	Debuted at No. 190 on the Billboard 200
18	Brockhampton	TM	Question Everything, RCA Records	Debuted at No. 100 on the Billboard 200
18	Busta Rhymes	The Fuse is Lit	Conglomerate, Empire Distribution	
18	Comethazine	Bawskee 5	Alamo Records, Sony Music Entertainment	
18	Dave East and DJ Drama	The Book of David	Def Jam Recordings	
18	Dougie B	Nobody Bigger	Republic Records	
18	Enchanting	No Luv	1017 Records, Atlantic Records	
18	Jordan	Crooks and Queens	NQ Records	Debuted at No. 59 on the UK Albums Chart
18	Meekz	Respect the Come Up	Neighbourhood Recordings	Debuted at No. 12 on the UK Albums Chart
18	Rich Homie Quan	Family & Mula - Reloaded	Rich Homie Entertainment	
18	Rod Wave	Jupiter's Diary: 7 Day Theory	Alamo Records, Sony Music	Debuted at No. 9 on the Billboard 200
18	Roddy Ricch	Feed Tha Streets III	Bird Vision, Atlantic Records	Debuted at No. 14 on the Billboard 200
18	Saweetie	The Single Life	ICY, Warner Records	
18	Sheek Louch	Beast Mode 5	D Block Records	
18	Tom MacDonald	Renegade	Self-released	
18	Tom MacDonald	The Revolution	Self-released	
18	Vinnie Paz	Tortured in the Name of God's Unconditional Love	Iron Tusk	
19	Lil' Flip and CashStar	Make It Make Sense	G Rec, 3 Faces Ent, GT Digital	
21	Big Homiie G	Speak Up G	N-Less Entertainment	
21	Meek Mill	Flamerz 5	Maybach Music Group, Dream Chasers	
22	Homixide Gang	Homixide Lifestyle	Opium	
23	Jean Grae	Please Send Help	Self-released	
25	Big Yavo	The Largest	Geffen Records	
25	Curren$y	The Drive in Theatre Part 2	Jet Life Recordings	
25	Money Man	Blackout: The Sequel	Empire	
25	Quando Rondo and YoungBoy Never Broke Again	3860	Never Broke Again, Atlantic Records	Debuted at No. 62 on the Billboard 200
25	Sadat X and Dough Networkz	Science of Life	Dough Networkz Presents	
25	Stormzy	This Is What I Mean	Def Jam Recordings	Debuted at No. 1 on the UK Albums Chart
25	Troy Ave	New York City the Movie	Worldstar Distribution	
28	La Chat and Crunchy Black	Hood	Hardhittin Money Gang, Dime-A-Dozen Ent.	
28	Twiztid	Glyph	Majik Ninja Entertainment	
29	Lil Mosey	VER	Mogul Vision, Interscope Records	
29	Yung Kayo	Nineteen	Young Stoner Life, 300 Entertainment	

=== December ===
Day	Artist(s)	Album	Record label(s)	Entering chart position
1	BabyTron	They Won't Clear This	Self-released	
1	TOBi	Hoodwinked	Same Plate, RCA Records	
1	Trapboy Freddy	No Distractions	300 Entertainment	
2	Babyface Ray	Mob	Wavy Gang, Empire Distribution	Debuted at No. 54 on the Billboard 200
2	Chinx	CR6	Coke Boys Records	
2	DaBoii	Onna Gang	YWN, Empire Distribution	
2	Finesse2Tymes	90 Days	Bread Gang	Debuted at No. 57 on the Billboard 200
2	Metro Boomin	Heroes & Villains	Boominati Worldwide, Republic Records	Debuted at No. 1 on the Billboard 200
2	Phora	The Butterfly Effect	Self-released	
2	Powfu	Surrounded by Hounds and Serpents	Columbia Records	
2	Wifisfuneral	Until We Meet Again	Living Dead LLC.	
2	Yungeen Ace	Survivor of the Trenches	Geffen Records	
5	Dusty Locane	Catch da Flu	95MM, Empire Distribution	
6	Stalley	Somebody Up There Loves Me	Mello Music Group	
7	BSlime	Love Me or Don't	Young Stoner Life, 300 Entertainment	
8	Icewear Vezzo and DJ Drama	Paint the City	Quality Control Music	
9	A Boogie wit da Hoodie	Me vs. Myself	Atlantic Records, Highbridge The Label	Debuted at No. 6 on the Billboard 200
9	Apathy and Stu Bangas	King of Gods. No Second	Dirty Version LLC.	
9	Gucci Mane	So Icy Boyz: The Finale	1017 Records, Atlantic Records	
9	Kay Flock	The D.O.A. Tape (Care Package)	Universal Music Group	
9	Kool G Rap	Last of a Dying Breed	Full Mettle, DMG	
9	Lil Boom	Colorful	10K Projects	
9	Luh Soldier	Trench Baby 2	Geffen Records	
9	Mount Westmore	Snoop Cube 40 $hort	Death Row Records	Debuted at No. 188 on the Billboard 200
9	Scorey	Help Is on the Way	Columbia Records	
9	Sha EK	Return of the Jiggy	Defiant Records, Warner Records	
9	SZA	SOS	Top Dawg Entertainment, RCA Records	Debuted at No. 1 on the Billboard 200
12	Little Simz	No Thank You	Forever Living Originals	
16	Ab-Soul	Herbert	Top Dawg Entertainment	
16	G Perico	South Central	Perico's Innerprise, Empire Distribution	
16	Jacquees	Sincerely for You	Cash Money Records	Debuted at No. 163 on the Billboard 200
16	Ka$hdami	18	Republic Records	
16	NoCap	The Main Bird	Never Broke Again, Atlantic Records	
16	Only The Family and Lil Durk	Loyal Bros 2	OTF, Empire Distribution	Debuted at No. 37 on the Billboard 200
16	Peewee Longway	Live a Lil	MPA Bandcamp Music Group, Empire Distribution	
16	Quin NFN and Lil 2z	2's & 4's	NFN Entertainment, Empire Distribution	
16	$uicideboy$ and Germ	DirtiestNastiest$uicide	G*59 Records	Debuted at No. 54 on the Billboard 200
16	The Alchemist	The Alchemist Sandwich	ALC, Empire Distribution	
16	Young Dolph	Paper Route Frank	Paper Route Empire	Debuted at No. 25 on the Billboard 200
16	Your Old Droog	YOD Presents: The Shining	Droog Recordings	
16	Kurupt and C-Mob	Don't Be Stupid	Penagon Records, GOTTI MOB, Compound Interest	
20	jev.	the color grey.	Loner, inc.	
21	Killy	Crazy Life of Sin	Secret Sound Club	
21	Mike	Beware of the Monkey	10k	
23	Sauce Walka	Sauce Ghetto Gospel 3	The Sauce Familia, Empire Distribution	
23	YoungBoy Never Broke Again	Lost Files	Never Broke Again, Atlantic Records	Debuted at No. 45 on the Billboard 200
30	Smoke DZA and The Smokers Club	Money for Dummies	RFC Music Group	

== Highest-charting songs ==
=== United States ===
Hip hop songs from any year which charted in the 2022 Top 40 of the Billboard Hot 100
Song	Artist	Project	Peak position
"First Class"	Jack Harlow	Come Home the Kids Miss You	1
"Wait for U"	Future featuring Drake and Tems	I Never Liked You	1
"Jimmy Cooks"	Drake featuring 21 Savage	Honestly, Nevermind	1
"About Damn Time"	Lizzo	Special	1
"Super Freaky Girl"	Nicki Minaj	Pink Friday 2	1
"Do We Have a Problem?"	Nicki Minaj and Lil Baby	Queen Radio: Volume 1	2
"Rich Flex"	Drake and 21 Savage	Her Loss	2
"Major Distribution"	Drake and 21 Savage	Her Loss	3
"Super Gremlin"	Kodak Black	Back for Everything	3
"Big Energy"	Latto	777	3
"N95"	Kendrick Lamar	Mr. Morale & the Big Steppers	3
"I Like You (A Happier Song)"	Post Malone featuring Doja Cat	Twelve Carat Toothache	3
"Puffin on Zootiez"	Future	I Never Liked You	4
"California Breeze"	Lil Baby	It's Only Me	4
"On BS"	Drake and 21 Savage	Her Loss	4
"Spin Bout U"	Drake and 21 Savage	Her Loss	5
"Die Hard"	Kendrick Lamar, Blxst and Amanda Reifer	Mr. Morale & the Big Steppers	5
"Staying Alive"	DJ Khaled featuring Drake and Lil Baby	God Did	5
"Sticky"	Drake	Honestly, Nevermind	6
"Pussy & Millions"	Drake and 21 Savage featuring Travis Scott	Her Loss	6
"Privileged Rappers"	Drake and 21 Savage	Her Loss	7
"Falling Back"	Drake	Honestly, Nevermind	7
"Pushin P"	Gunna and Future featuring Young Thug	DS4Ever	7
"Woman"	Doja Cat	Planet Her	7
"Silent Hill"	Kendrick Lamar and Kodak Black	Mr. Morale & the Big Steppers	7
"United in Grief"	Kendrick Lamar	Mr. Morale & the Big Steppers	8
"712PM"	Future	I Never Liked You	8
"Forever"	Lil Baby featuring Fridayy	It's Only Me	8
"Superhero (Heroes & Villains)"	Metro Boomin, Future and Chris Brown	Heroes & Villains	8
"Thats What I Want"	Lil Nas X	Montero	8
"Circo Loco"	Drake and 21 Savage	Her Loss	8
"BackOutsideBoyz"	Drake	Her Loss	9
"Tomorrow 2"	GloRilla and Cardi B	Anyways, Life's Great	9
"Vegas"	Doja Cat	Elvis	10
"Real Spill"	Lil Baby	It's Only Me	10
"I'm Dat Nigga"	Future	I Never Liked You	10
"I'm on One"	Future featuring Drake	I Never Liked You	11
"Father Time"	Kendrick Lamar featuring Sampha	Mr. Morale & the Big Steppers	11
"Hours in Silence"	Drake and 21 Savage	Her Loss	11
"Broke Boys"	Drake and 21 Savage	Her Loss	12
"Love You Better"	Future	I Never Liked You	12
"Cooped Up"	Post Malone featuring Roddy Ricch	Twelve Carat Toothache	12
"Rich Spirit"	Kendrick Lamar	Mr. Morale & the Big Steppers	13
"Texts Go Green"	Drake	Honestly, Nevermind	13
"Hot Shit"	Cardi B, Kanye West and Lil Durk	Non-album single	13
"Right On"	Lil Baby	Non-album single	13
"In a Minute"	Lil Baby	It's Only Me	14
"Broadway Girls"	Lil Durk featuring Morgan Wallen	7220	14
"Massive"	Drake	Honestly, Nevermind	14
"Treacherous Twins"	Drake and 21 Savage	Her Loss	14
"Keep It Burnin"	Future featuring Kanye West	I Never Liked You	15
"Pop Out"	Lil Baby featuring Nardo Wick	It's Only Me	15
"Middle of the Ocean"	Drake	Her Loss	15
"Sweetest Pie"	Megan Thee Stallion and Dua Lipa	Traumazine	15
"Thousand Miles"	The Kid Laroi	The First Time (Deluxe Version)	15
"The Heart Part 5"	Kendrick Lamar	Mr. Morale & the Big Steppers	15
"We Cry Together"	Kendrick Lamar and Taylour Paige	Mr. Morale & the Big Steppers	16
"Too Easy"	Gunna and Future	DS4Ever	16
"Jumbotron Shit Poppin"	Drake	Her Loss	16
"God Did"	DJ Khaled featuring Rick Ross, Lil Wayne, Jay-Z, John Legend and Fridayy	God Did	17
"Nail Tech"	Jack Harlow	Come Home the Kids Miss You	18
"Ahhh Ha"	Lil Durk	7220	18
"More M's"	Drake and 21 Savage	Her Loss	18
"I Guess It's Fuck Me"	Drake	Her Loss	19
"Never Hating"	Lil Baby and Young Thug	It's Only Me	19
"Worldwide Steppers"	Kendrick Lamar	Mr. Morale & the Big Steppers	19
"Count Me Out"	Kendrick Lamar	Mr. Morale & the Big Steppers	20
"Bussin"	Nicki Minaj and Lil Baby	Queen Radio: Volume 1	20
"Massaging Me"	Future	I Never Liked You	20
"Calling My Name"	Drake	Honestly, Nevermind	20
"Get Into It (Yuh)"	Doja Cat	Planet Her	20
"Dua Lipa"	Jack Harlow	Come Home the Kids Miss You	21
"A Keeper"	Drake	Honestly, Nevermind	21
"Alone"	Rod Wave	Beautiful Mind	21
"Heyy"	Lil Baby	It's Only Me	21
"Stand on It"	Lil Baby	It's Only Me	22
"What Happened to Virgil"	Lil Durk featuring Gunna	7220	22
"True Love"	Kanye West and XXXTentacion	Donda 2	22
"Too Many Nights"	Metro Boomin and Future featuring Don Toliver	Heroes & Villains	22
"Purple Hearts"	Kendrick Lamar, Summer Walker and Ghostface Killah	Mr. Morale & the Big Steppers	22
"Savior"	Kendrick Lamar, Baby Keem and Sam Dew	Mr. Morale & the Big Steppers	23
"Still D.R.E."	Dr. Dre featuring Snoop Dogg	2001	23
"Currents"	Drake	Honestly, Nevermind	23
"Churchill Downs"	Jack Harlow featuring Drake	Come Home the Kids Miss You	23
"In My Head"	Juice Wrld	Non-album single	23
"Umbrella"	Metro Boomin, 21 Savage and Young Nudy	Heroes & Villains	23
"Thought I Was Playing"	Gunna and 21 Savage	DS4Ever	23
"P Power"	Gunna featuring Drake	DS4Ever	24
"For a Nut"	Future featuring Gunna and Young Thug	I Never Liked You	24
"Detox"	Lil Baby	Non-album single	25
"Chickens"	Future featuring EST Gee	I Never Liked You	26
"Petty Too"	Lil Durk featuring Future	7220	26
"Cash In Cash Out"	Pharrell Williams featuring 21 Savage and Tyler, the Creator	TBA	26
"Not Finished"	Lil Baby	It's Only Me	26
"3AM on Glenwood"	21 Savage	Her Loss	27
"Niagara Falls (Foot or 2)"	Metro Boomin, Travis Scott and 21 Savage	Heroes & Villains	27
"25k Jacket"	Gunna featuring Lil Baby	DS4Ever	28
"Flight's Booked"	Drake	Honestly, Nevermind	28
"Plan B"	Megan Thee Stallion	Traumazine	29
"Gold Stacks"	Future	I Never Liked You	29
"Beautiful"	DJ Khaled featuring Future and SZA	God Did	29
"No Interviews"	Lil Durk	7220	30
"Betty (Get Money)"	Yung Gravy	Marvelous	30
"Big Time"	DJ Khaled featuring Future and Lil Baby	God Did	31
"Raindrops (Insane)"	Metro Boomin and Travis Scott	Heroes & Villains	31
"Star Walkin'"	Lil Nas X	Non-album single	32
"Perfect Timing"	Lil Baby	It's Only Me	32
"In My Head"	Lil Tjay	Non-album single	33
"Rich (Interlude)"	Kendrick Lamar	Mr. Morale & the Big Steppers	33
"Worst Day"	Future	I Never Liked You	34
"Golden Child"	Lil Durk	7220	34
"Yungen"	Rod Wave featuring Jack Harlow	Beautiful Mind	35
"Beat the Odds"	Lil Tjay	Non-album single	36
"Thinking with My Dick"	Kevin Gates featuring Juicy J	Stranger than Fiction	37
"Blick Blick"	Coi Leray and Nicki Minaj	Trendsetter	37
"Umm Hmm"	YoungBoy Never Broke Again	The Last Slimeto	37
"Cold December"	Rod Wave	Beautiful Mind	38
"To the Moon!"	Jnr Choi and Sam Tompkins	Non-album single	38
"Distraction"	Polo G	Hood Poet	39
"Voodoo"	Future featuring Kodak Black	I Never Liked You	39
"Don't Play That"	King Von and 21 Savage	What It Means to Be King	40
"Handsomer"	Russ featuring Ktlyn	Non-album single	40
"Poland"	Lil Yachty	Non-album single	40
"Mr. Morale"	Kendrick Lamar and Tanna Leone	Mr. Morale & the Big Steppers	40

=== United Kingdom ===
Hip hop songs from any year which charted in the 2022 Top 10 of the UK Singles Chart
Song	Artist	Project	Peak position
"Starlight"	Dave	Non-album single	1
"Doja"	Central Cee	Non-album single	2
"Baby"	Aitch and Ashanti	Close to Home	2
"Coming for You"	SwitchOTR featuring A1 x J1	Non-album single	5
"My G"	Aitch featuring Ed Sheeran	Close to Home	6
"Overseas"	D-Block Europe featuring Central Cee	Home Alone 2	6
"War"	ArrDee and Aitch	Pier Pressure	6
"IFTK"	Tion Wayne and La Roux	Non-album single	6
"Hide & Seek"	Stormzy	This Is What I Mean	7
"BMW"	Bad Boy Chiller Crew	Disrespectful	7
"Pump 101"	Digga D and Still Brickin'	Noughty by Nature	9
"Rocket Science"	Clavish featuring D-Block Europe	Rap Game Awful	9

== Highest first-week consumption ==
List of albums with the highest first-week consumption (sales + streaming + track equivalent), as of December 2022 in the United States
Number	Album	Artist	1st-week consumption	1st-week position	Refs
1	Her Loss	Drake and 21 Savage	404,000	1	
2	Mr. Morale & the Big Steppers	Kendrick Lamar	295,500	1	
3	I Never Liked You	Future	222,000	1	
4	It's Only Me	Lil Baby	216,000	1	
5	Honestly, Nevermind	Drake	204,000	1	
6	Heroes & Villains	Metro Boomin	185,000	1	
7	DS4Ever	Gunna	150,300	1	
8	Twelve Carat Toothache	Post Malone	121,000	2	
9	7220	Lil Durk	120,500	1	
10	Beautiful Mind	Rod Wave	115,000	1	

== All critically reviewed albums ranked ==
=== Metacritic ===
Number	Artist	Album	Average score	Number of reviews	Reference
1	Nas	King's Disease III	88	11 reviews	
2	Loyle Carner	Hugo	87	8 reviews	
3	Little Simz	No Thank You	86	13 reviews	
4	Mike	Beware of the Monkey	86	5 reviews	
5	Kendrick Lamar	Mr. Morale & the Big Steppers	85	26 reviews	
6	Earl Sweatshirt	Sick!	85	17 reviews	
7	Denzel Curry	Melt My Eyez See Your Future	85	8 reviews	
8	Fly Anakin	Frank	84	7 reviews	
9	Danger Mouse and Black Thought	Cheat Codes	83	17 reviews	
10	Pusha T	It's Almost Dry	83	15 reviews	
11	Saba	Few Good Things	83	9 reviews	
12	JID	The Forever Story	83	6 reviews	
13	Moor Mother	Jazz Codes	83	5 reviews	
14	Open Mike Eagle	Component System with the Auto Reverse	83	5 reviews	
15	Jeshi	Universal Credit	83	4 reviews	
16	Vince Staples	Ramona Park Broke My Heart	82	10 reviews	
17	Digga D	Noughty by Nature	82	6 reviews	
18	Roc Marciano and The Alchemist	The Elephant Man's Bones	82	6 reviews	
19	Conway the Machine	God Don't Make Mistakes	81	8 reviews	
20	Kojey Radical	Reason to Smile	81	7 reviews	
21	Ho99o9	Skin	81	6 reviews	
22	Quelle Chris	Deathfame	81	5 reviews	
23	Mykki Blanco	Stay Close to Music	81	5 reviews	
24	Billy Woods	Aethiopes	81	5 reviews	
25	Cakes da Killa	Svengali	81	4 reviews	
26	Megan Thee Stallion	Traumazine	80	12 reviews	
27	Curren$y and The Alchemist	Continuance	80	6 reviews	
28	Central Cee	23	80	5 reviews	
29	Sampa the Great	As Above, So Below	79	15 reviews	
30	Stormzy	This Is What I Mean	79	14 reviews	
31	Brockhampton	The Family	79	10 reviews	
32	Lupe Fiasco	Drill Music in Zion	79	8 reviews	
33	Black Star	No Fear of Time	79	5 reviews	
34	Freddie Gibbs	Soul Sold Separately	78	8 reviews	
35	Benny the Butcher	Tana Talk 4	78	6 reviews	
36	Phife Dawg	Forever	77	7 reviews	
37	Cypress Hill	Back in Black	76	11 reviews	
38	Flo Milli	You Still Here, Ho?	76	8 reviews	
39	EarthGang	Ghetto Gods	76	7 reviews	
40	Kid Cudi	Entergalactic	75	4 reviews	
41	Joey Bada$$	2000	74	9 reviews	
42	Flohio	Out of Heart	74	7 reviews	
43	070 Shake	You Can't Kill Me	74	6 reviews	
44	Drake	Honestly, Nevermind	73	14 reviews	
45	The Koreatown Oddity	IsThisForReal?	73	6 reviews	
46	Rod Wave	Beautiful Mind	73	5 reviews	
47	Metro Boomin	Heroes & Villains	73	5 reviews	
48	Rico Nasty	Las Ruinas	73	4 reviews	
49	Cordae	From a Birds Eye View	71	7 reviews	
50	Lil Durk	7220	71	5 reviews	
51	Quavo and Takeoff	Only Built for Infinity Links	70	6 reviews	
52	Future	I Never Liked You	69	7 reviews	
53	Post Malone	Twelve Carat Toothache	68	15 reviews	
54	Iann Dior	On to Better Things	68	5 reviews	
55	Aitch	Close to Home	67	8 reviews	
56	Lil Baby	It's Only Me	66	9 reviews	
57	Big K.R.I.T.	Digital Roses Don't Die	66	5 reviews	
58	Mount Westmore	Snoop Cube 40 $hort	66	5 reviews	
59	Fivio Foreign	B.I.B.L.E.	64	6 reviews	
60	A Boogie wit da Hoodie	Me vs. Myself	63	5 reviews	
61	Drake and 21 Savage	Her Loss	62	12 reviews	
62	YoungBoy Never Broke Again	The Last Slimeto	62	6 reviews	
63	Coi Leray	Trendsetter	60	4 reviews	
64	RZA	Bobby Digital and the Pit of Snakes	60	4 reviews	
65	The Game	Drillmatic – Heart vs. Mind	59	5 reviews	
66	Nav	Demons Protected by Angels	59	4 reviews	
67	2 Chainz	Dope Don't Sell Itself	58	7 reviews	
68	YG	I Got Issues	58	4 reviews	
69	Jack Harlow	Come Home the Kids Miss You	51	9 reviews	
70	Gunna	DS4Ever	51	5 reviews	
71	Kanye West	Donda 2	48	6 reviews	
72	DJ Khaled	God Did	43	6 reviews	

== See also ==
- Previous article: 2021 in hip-hop
- Next article: 2023 in hip-hop
