= 2022 in American music =

The following is a list of events and releases that happened in 2022 in music in the United States.

== Notable events ==
=== January ===
- 8 – After a 50-year career, David Lee Roth retired from music following the conclusion of a five-date Las Vegas residency.
- 14 – Underoath released their first studio album in four years, Voyeurist.
- 16 – Daughtry bassist Josh Paul announced that he was leaving the band after fifteen years. He previously left the band in 2012 and returned the next year.
- 20 – Singer and actor Meat Loaf died at the age of 74.
- 21 – Band of Horses released their first studio album in almost six years, Things Are Great.
  - John Mellencamp released his first studio album in five years, Strictly a One-Eyed Jack.
  - Aoife O'Donovan released her first studio album in six years, Age of Apathy.

=== February ===
- 4 – Erin Rae released her first studio album in four years Lighten Up.
- 11 – Mary J. Blige released her first studio album in nearly five years, Good Morning Gorgeous.
  - Once Human released their first studio album in five years, Scar Weaver.
  - Amos Lee released his first studio album in four years, Dreamland.
  - Spoon released their first album in five years, Lucifer on the Sofa.
  - Joe Nichols released his first studio album in five years, Good Day for Living.
- 13 – Mickey Guyton performed the National Anthem, and Dr. Dre, Snoop Dogg, Eminem, Mary J. Blige, and Kendrick Lamar performed the halftime show during Super Bowl LVI at SoFi Stadium in Inglewood, California.
- 18 – Beach House released their first studio album in four years, Once Twice Melody.
  - Hurray for the Riff Raff released their first studio album in five years, Life on Earth.
- 25 – Dashboard Confessional released their first studio album in four years, All the Truth That I Can Tell.

=== March ===
- 4 – Dolly Parton released her first studio album of original material in five years, Run, Rose, Run.
  - Danielle Bradbery released her first studio album in five years, In Between: The Collection.
  - Crowbar released their first studio album in six years, Zero and Below.
- 6 – The Industrial Strength Tour, featuring Ministry, Melvins and Corrosion of Conformity, began at Baltimore Soundstage in Baltimore, Maryland; the tour was initially scheduled to take place in the summer of 2020 but was postponed to spring 2021, then to fall, both due to the COVID-19 pandemic, and later to its current date.
- 7– The 57th Academy of Country Music Awards took place at Allegiant Stadium in Paradise, Nevada. This was the first time in fifty years the show did not air on broadcast television. It was instead streamed on Prime Video.
- 18 – Stabbing Westward released their first studio album in 21 years, Chasing Ghosts.
- 25 – Longtime Foo Fighters drummer Taylor Hawkins was found dead in his hotel room in Bogotá, Colombia, where the band was scheduled to play a show that night. He was 50 years old.

=== April ===
- 1 – Red Hot Chili Peppers released their first studio album in nearly six years, Unlimited Love. It was also their first album to feature guitarist John Frusciante since their 2006 album, Stadium Arcadium. Unlimited Love would be followed by the band's thirteenth studio album, Return of the Dream Canteen, just six months later.
  - The Color Fred released their first studio album in nearly 15 years, A Year and Change.
- 3 – The 64th Annual Grammy Awards took place at the MGM Grand Garden Arena in Las Vegas. Jon Batiste won the most awards with five including Album of the Year with We Are.
- 8 – Josh Tillman, as Father John Misty, released his first album in four years, Chloë and the Next 20th Century.
  - Cole Swindell released his first studio album in four years, Stereotype.
  - Jack White released his first solo studio album in four years, Fear of the Dawn. It was followed by the companion album Entering Heaven Alive three months later.
- 11 – The CMT Music Awards took place in Nashville, Tennessee.
- 22 – Bonnie Raitt released her first studio album in six years, Just Like That....
  - Dorothy released their first studio album in four years, Gifts from the Holy Ghost.
  - Bowling for Soup released their first album in six years, Pop Drunk Snot Bread. It was their final album with lead guitarist and co-founder Chris Burney, who announced his retirement in 2025.
- 29 – Ted Nugent released his first studio album in four years, Detroit Muscle.
- 30 – Country singer Naomi Judd died at the age of 76.

=== May ===
- 6 – Halestorm released their first studio album in nearly four years, Back from the Dead.
  - Fozzy released their first studio album in five years, Boombox.
  - Timothy B. Schmit released his first studio album in over five years, Day by Day.
- 9 – AleXa of Oklahoma won the first ever American Song Contest with the song "Wonderland".
- 13 – Kendrick Lamar released his first studio album in five years, Mr. Morale & the Big Steppers.
- 15 – The 2022 Billboard Music Awards took place at the MGM Grand Garden Arena in Las Vegas.
- 20 – Train released their first studio album in five years, AM Gold.
- 22 – Noah Thompson won the twentieth season of American Idol. HunterGirl was named runner-up.

=== June ===
- 3 – Gwar released their first studio album in five years, The New Dark Ages.
- 4 – Bon Jovi co-founder and original bassist Alec John Such died at the age of 70.
- 10 – Carrie Underwood released her first studio album of all original material in nearly four years, Denim & Rhinestones.
- 17 − Dan Reed Network released their first studio album in four years, Let's Hear It For The King.
- 20 – Due to internal struggles between himself and the band, Live fired its co-founder and lead guitarist, Chad Taylor. Later in the year, it was confirmed by former lead singer Chris Shinn that Patrick Dahlheimer and Chad Gracey were also fired from Live, leaving singer Ed Kowalczyk as the only founding member still in the band.
- 24 – Coheed and Cambria released their first studio album in four years, Vaxis – Act II: A Window of the Waking Mind.
  - Jack Johnson released his first studio album in five years, Meet the Moonlight.
  - Lupe Fiasco released his first studio album in four years, Drill Music in Zion.
  - Regina Spektor released her first studio album in six years, Home, Before and After.

=== July ===
- 1 − Municipal Waste released their first studio album in five years, Electrified Brain.
  - Shinedown released their first studio album in four years, Planet Zero.
- 8 – Journey released their first studio album in eleven years, Freedom.
- 15 − Interpol released their first studio album in four years, The Other Side of Make-Believe.
  - Senses Fail released their first studio album in four years, Hell Is in Your Head.
  - Travie McCoy released his first solo studio album in twelve years, Never Slept Better.
- 22 − Palisades released their first studio album in four years, Reaching Hypercritical.
  - Joey Bada$$ released his first studio album in five years, 2000.
  - Odesza released their first non-collaborative studio album in five years, The Last Goodbye.
- 29 − Beyoncé released her first studio album in six years, Renaissance.
  - Unwritten Law released their first studio album in eleven years, The Hum. It was the band's first studio album in 20 years to feature original drummer Wade Youman, with his last studio album being 2002's Elva.

=== August ===
- 5 – The Interrupters released their first studio album in four years, In the Wild.
- 19 – TobyMac released his first studio album in four years, Life After Death.
  - Panic! at the Disco, Brendon Urie's solo project, released its first studio album in four years, Viva Las Vengeance.
- 26 – Machine Head released their first studio album in four years, Of Kingdom and Crown.
  - JID released his first solo studio album in four years, The Forever Story.
  - Britney Spears released her first single in six years, "Hold Me Closer", a duet with Elton John.
- 28 – The MTV Video Music Awards took place at the Prudential Center in Newark, New Jersey. LL Cool J, Nicki Minaj, and Jack Harlow hosts. Jack Harlow took home the most awards with four. Taylor Swift won Video of the Year with All Too Well: The Short Film.

=== September ===
- 2 – Megadeth released their first studio album in six years, The Sick, the Dying... and the Dead!.
  - King's X released their first studio album in 14 years, Three Sides of One.
- 9 – Armor for Sleep released their first studio album in 15 years, The Rain Museum.
  - Santigold released her first studio album in six years, Spirituals.
  - Revocation released their first studio album in four years, Netherheaven.
  - Kane Brown released his first studio album in nearly four years, Different Man.
  - Flogging Molly released their first studio album in five years, Anthem.
  - Built to Spill released their first studio album in six years, When the Wind Forgets Your Name.
- 12 – Rapper PnB Rock was fatally shot in Los Angeles at the age of 30.
- 16 – The Mars Volta released their first studio album in ten years, The Mars Volta.
  - Death Cab for Cutie released their first studio album in four years, Asphalt Meadows.
  - Clutch released their first studio album in four years, Sunrise on Slaughter Beach.
  - LeAnn Rimes released her first studio album of original material in six years, God's Work.
- 23 – The Wonder Years released their first studio album in four years, The Hum Goes on Forever.
- 28 – Rapper Coolio was found dead at the age of 59 in Los Angeles.
- 30 – Yeah Yeah Yeahs released their first studio album in nine years, Cool It Down.
  - Off! released their first studio album in eight years, Free LSD.
  - Drowning Pool released their first studio album in six years, Strike a Nerve.
  - Alison Sudol released her first studio album in ten years, Still Come the Night, which is also her first album under her own name after previously recording as A Fine Frenzy.

=== October ===
- 4 – Country music legend Loretta Lynn died at the age of 90.
- 7 – Broken Bells released their first studio album in eight years, Into the Blue.
  - Charlie Puth released his first studio album in four years, Charlie.
  - Shaboozey released his first studio album in four years, Cowboys Live Forever, Outlaws Never Die.
- 11 – Blink-182 announced that guitarist and co-founder Tom DeLonge has rejoined the band after leaving in 2015; DeLonge subsequently replaced Matt Skiba, who had been his replacement.
- 14 – Skid Row released their first studio album in sixteen years, The Gang's All Here. It is their first album with new vocalist Erik Grönwall, who replaced ZP Theart in March.
  - Nothing More released their first studio album in five years, Spirits.
  - We Came as Romans released their first studio album in five years, Darkbloom.
- 28 – Jerry Lee Lewis died at the age of 87.
  - Dead Cross released their first studio album in five years, II.
  - Polyphia released their first studio album in four years, Remember That You Will Die.

=== November ===
- 1 – Rapper Takeoff of Migos was shot dead at a bowling alley in Houston, Texas at the age of 28.
- 3 – After supporting the Zac Brown Band on three of their tours, singer Caroline Jones joins the band as an official member.
- 4 – The Welcome Wagon released their first studio album in five years, Esther.
- 7 – Flyleaf announced the return of original lead vocalist Lacey Sturm, who had left following the recording of 2012's New Horizons. The band also announced that they would now be known as "Flyleaf with Lacey Sturm".
- 9 – The 56th Annual CMA Awards took place at the Bridgestone Arena in Nashville, Tennessee.
- 11 – Chelsea Grin released their first studio album in four years, Suffer in Hell, the first half of a double album. The second half, Suffer in Heaven, will be released in March 2023.
- 15 – The Smashing Pumpkins released act one (out of three) of a rock opera album called Atum, which serves as a sequel to previous albums Mellon Collie and the Infinite Sadness (1995) and Machina/The Machines of God (2000). Act two is due for release on January 31, 2023, with the full album set for release on April 21, 2023.
- 18 – Disturbed released their first studio album in four years, Divisive.
- 20 – The American Music Awards took place at the Microsoft Theater in Los Angeles.
- 25 – Leather released her first studio album in four years, We Are the Chosen.

=== December ===
- 2 – Neal Casal re-released his 1996 album, Rain Wind and Speed.
  - Hammers of Misfortune released their first studio album in six years, Overtaker.
- 9 – Lionheart released their first album in five years, Welcome to the West Coast III, a sequel to 2017's Welcome to the West Coast II.
  - SZA released her first album in five years, SOS.
- 13 – Bryce Leatherwood was crowned the winner of the twenty-second season of The Voice, bodie was runner-up. Morgan Myles, Omar Jose Cardona, and Brayden Lape finished in third, fourth, and fifth place respectively.
- 16 – Ab-Soul released his first studio album in six years, Herbert.
  - Nostalghia released her first studio album in four years, Wounds.
  - Tiffany released her first studio album in four years, Shadows.
  - Circa Survive released their first studio album in five years, Two Dreams, while also announcing an indefinite hiatus. However, frontman Anthony Green would later confirm in 2025 that the band had permanently disbanded, thus making this album their last.

== Bands formed ==
- L.S. Dunes

== Bands reformed ==
- Coal Chamber
- Finch
- Flyleaf
- The Gaslight Anthem
- Pantera
- Porno for Pyros
- A Skylit Drive
- She Wants Revenge
- Sunny Day Real Estate
- Yellowcard

== Bands on hiatus ==
- Brockhampton
- Florida Georgia Line
- The Neighbourhood
- Why Don't We

== Bands disbanded ==
- Blessthefall
- Circa Survive
- The Detroit Cobras
- Every Time I Die
- Kids See Ghosts
- mewithoutYou
- The Mighty Mighty Bosstones
- Migos
- Neverland Express
- Quiet Company
- The Sword

== Albums released in 2022 ==
=== January ===
Date	Album	Artist	Genre(s)
7	There and Back Again	Eric Nam	K-pop; R&B; EDM; acoustic
7	Mamaru	RuPaul	R&B
7	Wong's Cafe	Cory Wong	Funk
7	Roundtable	Doyle Lawson	Bluegrass; gospel
7	AYII	American Young	Country
14	Covers	Cat Power	Indie rock
14	From a Birds Eye View	Cordae	East Coast hip hop; hip hop
14	Brightside	The Lumineers	Americana; indie rock; folk rock
14	Dominion	Skillet	Hard rock; alternative rock; Christian rock
14	Sick!	Earl Sweatshirt	Hip hop
21	Country Stuff The Album	Walker Hayes	Country
21	On to Better Things	Iann Dior	Hip hop
21	Strictly A One Eyed Jack	John Mellencamp	Rock
21	Age of Apathy	Aoife O'Donovan	Folk rock; Americana
21	Colors	YoungBoy Never Broke Again	Hip hop
28	Apocalypse Whenever	Bad Suns	Alternative rock; indie pop
28	It's Not So Bad	Kyle	Hip hop
28	Frayed at Both Ends	Aaron Lewis	Country
28	Three Dimensions Deep	Amber Mark	R&B; pop
28	The Alien Coast	St. Paul and The Broken Bones	Southern soul; soul

=== February ===
Date	Album	Artist	Genre
4	Time Skiffs	Animal Collective	Indie pop; psychedelic folk
4	A Dream About Death (EP)	Circa Survive	Post-hardcore; emo
4	Proclaimer of Things	The High Water Marks	Indie pop; indie rock
4	LP3	Hippo Campus	Indie rock; indie pop
4	Inside Voices / Outside Voices	K.Flay	Indie pop; pop rock; alternative rock
4	Requiem	KoЯn	Nu metal
4	Laurel Hell	Mitski	Indie rock
4	The Path of the Clouds	Marissa Nadler	Folk; indie rock
11	Dragon New Warm Mountain I Believe in You	Big Thief	Folk rock; indie rock; alternative country
11	Good Morning Gorgeous	Mary J. Blige	Hip hop; R&B; soul
11	Everything Except Desire (EP)	William Ryan Key	Indie rock; indie pop
11	Blue in the Sky	Dustin Lynch	Country
11	Good Day For Living	Joe Nichols	Country
11	Scar Weaver	Once Human	Hard rock; heavy metal
11	Lucifer on the Sofa	Spoon	Indie rock; blues rock; alternative rock
11	Earthling	Eddie Vedder	Rock
14	The Heart Behead You	Foxy Shazam	Rock; glam rock
18	Once Twice Melody	Beach House	Dream pop
18	Almost Proud	Del McCoury Band	Bluegrass; jam band
18	Life on Earth	Hurray for the Riff Raff	Americana; folk
18	Acts of God	Immolation	Death metal
18	Cowboy Tears	Oliver Tree	Country rock; indie pop; alternative rock
18	Manticore	Shovels & Rope	Folk; Americana
25	The Death of Peace of Mind	Bad Omens	Metalcore
25	Spellbound	Judy Collins	Pop; folk
25	All the Truth That I Can Tell	Dashboard Confessional	Emo; alternative rock; pop rock
25	Hard Skool (EP)	Guns N' Roses	Hard rock; alternative metal; punk rock; industrial rock
25	ORIGIN STORY (1994–1999)	The Moldy Peaches	Garage rock; indie rock
25	Sweet Tooth	Mom Jeans	Indie pop; pop punk

=== March ===
Date	Album	Artist	Genre
4	Things Are Great	Band of Horses	Indie rock; southern rock
4	Aftermath	Belmont	Punk rock; pop-punk
4	Zero and Below	Crowbar	Sludge metal; doom metal
4	Diplo	Diplo	Dance-pop; EDM; house
4	Hella	Just Friends	Funk rock; alternative rock
4	The End	Trip Lee	Christian hip hop; southern hip hop
4	Run, Rose, Run	Dolly Parton	Country
11	Tana Talk 4	Benny the Butcher	Hip hop
11	Echoes and Cocoons	Brandon Boyd	Rock
11	Great American Paintings	The Districts	Indie rock; rock
11	Getaway	Orion Sun	R&B; soul
11	Elsewhere	Set It Off	Pop-punk; pop rock
11	Drugs in California	Transviolet	Pop rock; indie pop
11	The Optimistic	Drake White	Country
18	Otra	Audio Karate	Pop-punk; alternative rock
18	Back in Black	Cypress Hill	Hip hop; rap rock
18	A Study of the Human Experience Volume One (EP)	Gayle	Pop rock; power pop
18	Feel the Void	Hot Water Music	Punk rock; post-hardcore
18	For the Sake of Bethel Woods	Midlake	Folk rock; alternative rock
18	Sore Thumb	Oso Oso	Emo; indie rock
18	Chasing Ghosts	Stabbing Westward	Industrial rock; industrial metal; alternative metal
20	SZNZ: Spring (EP)	Weezer	Pop rock; folk rock; power pop
21	Bad Reputation	Kid Rock	Rock; southern rock
25	Fever Dream	Cannons	Indie pop
25	Uncanny Valley	Coin	Indie pop; pop rock; alternative rock
25	777	Latto	Hip hop
25	Mainstream Sellout	Machine Gun Kelly	Punk rock; pop-punk
25	Matisyahu	Matisyahu	Reggae; hip hop
25	Humble Quest	Maren Morris	Country
25	War of the Worlds, Pt. 2	Michael Romeo	Progressive metal; neoclassical metal; symphonic metal; power metal
25	Diaspora Problems	Soul Glo	Hardcore punk; rap rock
25	Tell Me That's It's Over	Wallows	Alternative rock; post-punk

=== April ===
Date	Album	Artist	Genre(s)
1	A Year and Change	The Color Fred	Indie rock; alternative rock
1	Time Isn't Real	Grabbitz	EDM; electro
1	Quitters	Christian Lee Hutson	Indie rock
1	It's Not Easy Being Human	Islander	Hard rock; alternative metal
1	Set Sail	North Mississippi Allstars	Southern rock; blues rock
1	Unlimited Love	Red Hot Chili Peppers	Funk rock; alternative rock
1	Where We Started	Thomas Rhett	Country
8	Familia	Camila Cabello	Latin pop
8	Chloë and the Next 20th Century	Father John Misty	Indie folk; soft rock; baroque pop
8	Growing Up	The Linda Lindas	Punk rock
8	Second Nature	Lucius	Indie pop; indie rock
8	Five Seconds Flat	Lizzy McAlpine	Alternative rock; indie pop
8	Ego Trip	Papa Roach	Hard rock; nu metal; pop-punk
8	Further Joy	The Regrettes	Punk rock; indie pop
8	Rx	Role Model	Indie pop; indie rock
8	Stereotype	Cole Swindell	Country
8	Fear of the Dawn	Jack White	Blues rock; garage rock; alternative rock
15	(Un)Commentary	Alec Benjamin	Indie pop; folk-pop
15	The Trip Out	The Crystal Method	Electronic; trip hop
15	Freewheelin' Woman	Jewel	Pop
15	Watch My Moves	Kurt Vile	Rock; indie rock; folk rock
15	Middling Age	Tim Kasher	Alternative Rock, Indie Rock
22	Georgia	Jason Aldean	Country; country rock
22	Pop Drunk Snot Bread	Bowling for Soup	Punk rock; pop-punk; pop rock
22	Gifts from the Holy Ghost.	Dorothy	Hard rock; blues rock; post-grunge
22	Paint This Town	Old Crow Medicine Show	Folk
22	It's Almost Dry	Pusha T	Hip hop
22	Just Like That...	Bonnie Raitt	Americana; blues rock; blues
28	Dommin & The Oztones	Dommin & The Oztones	Rock
29	Every Shade of Blue	The Head and the Heart	Indie pop; indie rock; folk rock
29	Palomino	Miranda Lambert	Country
29	A Beautiful Time	Willie Nelson	Country
29	Detroit Muscle	Ted Nugent	Hard rock
29	Wet Tennis	Sofi Tukker	House; dance
29	Mahal	Toro y Moi	Psychedelic funk; indie pop
29	Power Station	Cory Wong	Funk

=== May ===
Date	Album	Artist	Genre(s)
6	My Echo, My Shadow, My Covers, and Me	Awolnation	Alternative rock; indie rock; covers
6	Un Verano Sin Ti	Bad Bunny	Reggaeton; cumbia; indie pop
6	Serotonin Dreams	BoyWithUke	Alternative rock; pop rock
6	Boombox	Fozzy	Heavy metal; hard rock
6	Back from the Dead	Halestorm	Hard rock; heavy metal
6	Come Home the Kids Miss You	Jack Harlow	Hip hop
6	The Last Resort: Greetings From	Midland	Neotraditional country
6	Day by Day	Timothy B. Schmit	Rock; soft rock
6	We've Been Going About This All Wrong	Sharon Van Etten	Indie rock
6	Try Again (EP)	The Walters	Alternative rock
6	Radiate Like This	Warpaint	Indie rock
11	Lil Black Jean Jacket 3	ASAP Ant	Hip hop
13	Dropout Boogie	The Black Keys	Rock
13	Preachers's Daughter	Ethel Cain	Alternative rock
13	So Far So Good	The Chainsmokers	Electropop; EDM
13	Esquemas	Becky G	Latin pop
13	Help!	Brandon Lake	Contemporary worship
13	Mr. Morale & the Big Steppers	Kendrick Lamar	Hip hop; Conscious hip hop; jazz rap; progressive rap
13	How Far	Tasha Layton	Contemporary Christian
13	12th of June	Lyle Lovett	Country
13	In Real Life	Mandy Moore	Pop
13	This Is a Photograph	Kevin Morby	Indie rock; folk rock
13	I Blame the World	Sasha Alex Sloan	Indie pop
13	Kings of the New Age	State Champs	Pop-punk
13	Red Balloon	Tank and the Bangas	R&B; soul; funk; hip hop
13	Shape & Form	Two Feet	Electronic; alternative rock
20	American Heartbreak	Zach Bryan	Country
20	One Is One	Delta Spirit	Indie rock; Americana
20	Floating on a Dream	Avi Kaplan	Americana
20	Hypnos	Ravyn Lenae	R&B; neo soul
20	AM Gold	Train	Pop rock; rock
20	Panther Island	The Unlikely Candidates	Alternative rock; indie rock
27	Organized Grime 2	Conway the Machine	Hip hop
27	Cheers	Jukebox the Ghost	Power pop; indie pop
27	Out of Light	Scary Kids Scaring Kids	Post-hardcore
27	Mark Tremonti Sings Sinatra	Mark Tremonti	Jazz; covers
27	Forest in the City	Umi	Neo soul; R&B
27	Cruel Country	Wilco	Alternative rock; indie rock
30	La Tormenta (EP)	Christina Aguilera	Spanish

=== June ===
Date	Album	Artist	Genre(s)
3	Inside Problems	Andrew Bird	Indie rock
3	Fear This	Crobot	Hard rock; heavy metal
3	The New Dark Ages	Gwar	Heavy metal; thrash metal
3	Versions of Modern Performance	Horsegirl	Alternative rock; rock
3	Remade in Misery	Memphis May Fire	Metalcore; post-hardcore
3	Madness	Polica	Rock; pop
3	Hive	Sub Urban	Indie pop
9	Kellyoke (EP)	Kelly Clarkson	Covers; pop
10	What Normal Was	Billy Howerdel	Rock; alternative rock
10	Revival	Judah & the Lion	Alternative rock; folk rock
10	Scoring the End of the World	Motionless in White	Hard rock; heavy metal
10	Fairhaven	Silent Drive	Post-hardcore
10	Denim & Rhinestones	Carrie Underwood	Country; country pop
17	Songs About You	Brett Eldredge	Country
17	Let's Hear It For the King	Dan Reed Network	Funk rock; hard rock
17	Destroy Rebuild	Destroy Rebuild Until God Shows	Post-hardcore
17	Tastes Like Gold	Lit	Alternative rock; rock
17	Kingdom Book One	Maverick City Music and Kirk Franklin	Worship; gospel
17	Orange Blood	Mt. Joy	Indie rock; indie pop
17	Ugly Season	Perfume Genius	Chamber pop; indie pop
17	More Black Superheroes	Westside Boogie	Hip hop
21	SZNZ: Summer (EP)	Weezer	Alternative rock; power pop; heavy metal
24	Tulip Drive	Jimmie Allen	Country
24	Vaxis – Act II: A Window of the Waking Mind	Coheed and Cambria	Progressive rock; alternative rock
24	Growin' Up	Luke Combs	Country
24	Superache	Conan Gray	Indie pop
24	Meet the Moonlight	Jack Johnson	Folk rock
24	Drill Music in Zion	Lupe Fiasco	Hip hop
24	Muna	Muna	Pop rock; indie rock; electropop
24	Home, Before and After	Regina Spektor	Indie pop

=== July ===
Date	Album	Artist	Genre(s)
1	Tremblers and Goggles by Rank	Guided By Voices	Indie rock; alternative rock
1	Mercury – Act 2	Imagine Dragons	Alternative rock; pop rock
1	Iapapo	Mice Parade	Post-rock; indie rock
1	Jazz Codes	Moor Mother	Experimental
1	Electrified Brain	Municipal Waste	Crossover thrash
1	Planet Zero	Shinedown	Hard rock; alternative rock
8	Moonrising	Alice Cohen	Alternative rock; indie rock
8	Freedom	Journey	Hard rock; arena rock
8	Live At The Grandel	Foxing	Indie Rock
8	Found Light	Laura Veirs	Folk
8	Pink Room	Wet	Indie pop
15	The Course of the Inevitable 2	Lloyd Banks	Hip hop; East Coast hip hop
15	Emails I Can't Send	Sabrina Carpenter	Pop
15	The Other Side of Make-Believe	Interpol	Indie rock; post-punk revival
15	Gemini Rights	Steve Lacy	Alternative R&B; soul
15	Special	Lizzo	Funk; disco; hip hop; pop
15	Never Slept Better	Travie McCoy	Hip hop; indie pop
15	Self Explanatory	Ne-Yo	R&B
15	Rebel vs. Rowdy	Rowdy Rebel	Hip hop
15	Hell Is in Your Head	Senses Fail	Post-hardcore
22	Emotional Creature	Beach Bunny	Indie rock; indie pop
22	2000	Joey Badass	East Coast hip hop
22	Welcome to the Chaos	Fame on Fire	Rap rock; hard rock; pop rock
22	Starlight and Ash	Oceans of Slumber	Progressive metal
22	The Last Goodbye	Odesza	Indietronica; chillwave; house
22	Reaching Hypercritical	Palisades	Post-hardcore; rock
22	Hello, Hi	Ty Segall	Garage rock; indie rock
22	Entering Heaven Alive	Jack White	Folk rock; rock
29	Silverline (EP)	Anberlin	Alternative rock
29	Renaissance	Beyoncé	R&B; pop; dance; disco; house; experimental
29	Walk Me Home... (EP)	Benson Boone	Pop
29	God's Country	Chat Pile	Noise rock; sludge metal
29	Jackpot Juicer	Dance Gavin Dance	Post-hardcore
29	Not Tight	Domi and JD Beck	Jazz; instrumental hip hop
29	Surrender	Maggie Rogers	Art pop; indie pop
29	Take It Like a Man	Amanda Shires	Country; folk
29	The Hum	Unwritten Law	Punk rock; alternative rock
29	Tornillo	Whiskey Myers	Country; southern rock
29	Multiverse	Wiz Khalifa	Hip hop; R&B; pop

=== August ===
Date	Album	Artist	Genre(s)
5	Tourist	John Calvin Abney	Folk; rock
5	In the Wild	The Interrupters	Punk rock; ska punk
5	All 4 Nothing	Lauv	Pop
5	Livin' My Best Life	Dylan Scott	Country
5	Bodboy	Bobby Shmurda	Hip Hop
12	Vibrating	Collective Soul	Alternative rock; rock
12	Cheat Codes	Danger Mouse & Black Thought	Hip hop
12	Chaos in Bloom	Goo Goo Dolls	Alternative rock; pop rock
12	Traumazine	Megan Thee Stallion	Hip hop
12	A Foul Form	Osees	Garage rock; punk rock
12	Beautiful Mind	Rod Wave	Hip hop
19	AfterLife	Five Finger Death Punch	Heavy metal
19	Shadowglow	Flipturn	Indie rock
19	Dancin' in the Country (EP)	Tyler Hubbard	Country
19	True Power	I Prevail	Metalcore; hard rock
19	Spaceships on the Blade	Larry June	Heavy metal
19	Holy Fvck	Demi Lovato	Hard rock; pop-punk
19	Heartmind	Cass McCombs	Alternative rock
19	Viva Las Vengeance	Panic! at the Disco	Pop rock
19	Easy on My Eyes (EP)	Stephen Sanchez	Pop rock; folk pop
19	Physical Thrills	Silversun Pickups	Alternative rock; indie rock
19	Pillow Talk	Tink	Hip hop
19	Life After Death	TobyMac	Christian hip hop; Christian rock
19	Ride	Walter Trout	Blues; blues rock
19	Faster Car Music (EP)	YBN Nahmir	Hip hop
26	Good Person	Ingrid Andress	Country; country pop
26	XOXO	CNCO	Latin pop
26	Coming Home	The Dangerous Summer	Pop-punk; emo
26	Midnight Control	Dirty Heads	Alternative rock; alternative hip hop; reggae rock
26	God Did	DJ Khaled	Hip hop
26	The Forever Story	JID	Hip hop; trap
26	Young Blood	Marcus King	Rock; southern rock
26	Of Kingdom and Crown	Machine Head	Groove metal; thrash metal
26	Never Had to Leave	Matt Maeson	Alternative rock
26	Hidden Youth	Surfaces	Soul; pop; hip hop
26	Tiny Moving Parts	Tiny Moving Parts	Emo; indie rock

=== September ===
Date	Album	Artist	Genre(s)
2	Theresa (EP)	The Front Bottoms	Alternative rock; pop
2	Three Sides of One	King's X	Hard rock; progressive metal
2	Live At Gilley's Pasadena TX 9/15/81	Kris Kristofferson	Country
2	The Sick, the Dying... and the Dead!	Megadeth	Thrash metal
2	Mr. Saturday Night	Jon Pardi	Country
9	The Rain Museum	Armor for Sleep	Emo; pop-punk; alternative rock
9	Different Man	Kane Brown	Country pop; R&B
9	When the Wind Forgets Your Name	Built to Spill	Indie rock
9	Anthem	Flogging Molly	Celtic punk
9	The Midnight Demon Club	Highly Suspect	Alternative rock
9	Legend	John Legend	R&B
9	Netherheaven	Revocation	Technical death metal; thrash metal
9	Spirituals	Santigold	Alternative rock; indie rock
9	Blossom, Pt. 1	The Summer Set	Pop rock; pop-punk
15	Dallas/Fort Worth	Drake Milligan	Country
16	Sunrise on Slaughter Beach	Clutch	Hard rock
16	The Hardest Parr	Noah Cyrus	Pop
16	Asphalt Meadows	Death Cab for Cutie	Indie rock; indie pop
16	Color Decay	The Devil Wears Prada	Hard rock
16	Decide	Djo	Neo-psychedelia; indie rock; psychedelic rock
16	I Never Felt Nun	EST Gee	Hip hop
16	Girl of My Dreams	Fletcher	Pop
16	Mr. Sun	Little Big Town	Country
16	Harbor City Season One	Kxng Crooked & Joell Ortiz	Hip hop
16	The Mars Volta.	The Mars Volta	Progressive rock; experimental rock
16	God's Work	LeAnn Rimes	Christian; country
16	She Said	Starcrawler	Rock; pop-punk; alternative rock
16	This Is Heavy	Mitchell Tenpenny	Country; country pop
16	We the Kingdom	We the Kingdom	Contemporary Christian
16	Hell Paso	Koe Wetzel	Alternative rock; alternative country; outlaw country
22	SZNZ: Autumn (EP)	Weezer	Dance-rock; power pop
23	Subject to Change	Kelsea Ballerini	Country; country pop
23	Things Happen That Way	Dr. John	Jazz; rock; soul
23	Hyper Relevisation	Eve 6	Alternative rock
23	Detour	Boney James	Jazz
23	Through The Madness Vol 2	Maddie & Tae	Country pop
23	Mercurial World (Deluxe)	Magdalena Bay	Synth-pop; electropop; indie pop
23	The Hum Goes on Forever	The Wonder Years	Alternative rock; emo; pop punk
30	The Bad Plus	The Bad Plus	Pop; jazz
30	This Machine Still Kills Fascists	Dropkick Murphys	Acoustic; punk rock
30	Strike a Nerve	Drowning Pool	Alternative metal; heavy metal
30	33	Jagwar Twin	Alternative rock; pop rock; indie pop
30	Entergalactic	Kid Cudi	Hip hop
30	Free LSD	Off!	Hardcore punk
30	The End, So Far	Slipknot	Nu metal; heavy metal
30	Still Come the Night	Alison Sudol	Indie rock
30	Cool It Down	Yeah Yeah Yeahs	Art rock

=== October ===
Date	Album	Artist	Genre(s)
7	Into the Blue	Broken Bells	Indie rock; rock
7	CHAOS NOW*	Jean Dawson	Punk rock; indie rock; experimental pop
7	People in Motion	Dayglow	Indie pop; alternative rock
7	Omens	Lamb of God	Hard rock; heavy metal
7	Only Built for Infinity Links	Quavo & Takeoff	Hip hop; trap
7	Digital Noise Alliance	Queensrÿche	Progressive metal
7	Charlie	Charlie Puth	Pop; R&B
7	Lessons For Mutants	Johanna Warren	Indie rock; alternative rock
7	Coping Mechanism	WILLOW	Alternative rock; pop-punk; emo; grunge; hard rock
7	3800 Degrees	YoungBoy Never Broke Again	Hip hop
14	Pawns & Kings	Alter Bridge	Heavy metal; progressive metal; hard rock; alternative metal
14	Rae	Ashe	Pop
14	A Very Backstreet Christmas	Backstreet Boys	Christmas; pop
14	Young Forever	Nessa Barrett	Alternative pop; pop rock
14	Spinning the Truth Around (Part I)	Blue October	Alternative rock; rock
14	Ytilaer	Bill Callahan	Indie folk
14	It's Only Me	Lil Baby	Hip hop; trap
14	Spirits	Nothing More	Hard rock; alternative rock
14	Return of the Dream Canteen	Red Hot Chili Peppers	Funk rock; alternative rock
14	The Gang's All Here	Skid Row	Heavy metal; hard rock
14	Complete Collapse	Sleeping with Sirens	Post-hardcore; pop-punk
14	I'm Good	Pia Toscano	Pop
14	Darkbloom	We Came as Romans	Metalcore; post-hardcore
21	Reason In Decline	Archers of Loaf	Indie rock; rock
21	Inner World Peace	Frankie Cosmos	Alternative rock; indie rock
21	Winterlicious	Debbie Gibson	Christmas; pop
21	Earth Worship	Rubblebucket	Alternative rock; indie pop
21	Midnights	Taylor Swift	Electronica; synth-pop; bedroom pop; chill-out; dream pop
21	Takin' It Back	Meghan Trainor	Doo-wop; pop
25	2econds	Jimmie's Chicken Shack	Alternative rock
28	II	Dead Cross	Hardcore punk; crossover thrash
28	Sentimental Fool	Lee Fields	R&B; soul
28	The Hell We Create	Fit for a King	Metalcore; hard rock; heavy metal
28	Tejano Punk Boyz	Giovannie and the Hired Guns	Country rock; alternative rock
28	5AM Paradise	Old Sea Brigade	Indie rock; folk
28	Fever Dream	Palaye Royale	Art rock; glam rock; garage rock
28	Marvelous	Yung Gravy	Hip hop

=== November ===
Date	Album	Artist	Genre(s)
4	Her Loss	21 Savage & Drake	Hip-hop
4	If I Were a Butterfly	Rayland Baxter	Alternative country; Americana
4	Dark Sun	Dayseeker	Post-hardcore; metalcore
4	Tropical Gothclub	Dean Fertita	Rock; hard rock
4	Other Worlds	The Pretty Reckless	Alternative rock; rock
4	Esther	The Welcome Wagon	Indie pop; gospel
11	Suffer in Hell	Chelsea Grin	Deathcore; heavy metal
11	Wane Into It	Drowse	Indie rock; post-punk
11	A Nurse to My Patient	FaltyDL	Techno; house; EDM
11	Let Yourself Free	Fitz and the Tantrums	Indie pop
11	Past Lives	L.S. Dunes	Post-hardcore; emo; punk rock
11	Blood Harmony	Larkin Poe	Blues rock; folk rock
11	Year of The Dark Horse	White Buffalo	Country; folk
16	American Bollywood	Young the Giant	Alternative rock; indie pop
18	Divisive	Disturbed	Hard rock; heavy metal
18	Los Angeles Forum: 4/26/69	Jimi Hendrix Experience	Rock
18	Cazimi	Caitlin Rose	Country
18	On The Other Side	The Stone Foxes	Alternative rock; hard rock; indie rock
18	The Generation of Danger	Tallah	Metalcore; nu metal
25	Paris Blues	The Doors	Blues rock; acid rock
25	Innate Passge	Elder	Stoner Metal, Progressive Rock
25	We Are the Chosen	Leather	Heavy metal
25	Christmas Songs (EP)	Katharine McPhee & David Foster	Christmas
25	Dead Again (Reissue)	Type O Negative	Hard rock; heavy metal
25	Memoirs of Hi-Tech Jazz	Waajeed	Jazz; blues

=== December ===
Date	Album	Artist	Genre(s)
2	Rain Wind and Speed (Reissue)	Neal Casal	Rock; pop
2	Summer Mixtape	The Driver Era	Alternative rock; R&B
2	Conditions of a Punk	Half Alive	Alternative rock; pop; dance pop
2	Double Album	NOFX	Punk rock; ska punk
2	Elvis On Tour	Elvis Presley	Rockabilly; pop; R&B
9	Permanent Radiant	Crosses	Dark wave; dream pop
9	Carry On (Reissue)	Pat Green	Country
9	Fun Machine the Sequel	Lake Street Drive	Southern rock; indie rock
9	Welcome to the West Coast III	Lionheart	Beatdown hardcore
9	Snoop Cube 40 $hort	Mount Westmore	Hip hop
9	SOS	SZA	R&B; alternative R&B
16	Herbert	Ab-Soul	Hip hop
16	Almighty So 2	Chief Keef	Hip hop
16	Two Dreams	Circa Survive	Alternative rock; post-hardcore
16	Wounds	Nostalghia	Indie rock; alternative rock
16	Shadows	Tiffany	Pop; pop rock
21	Beware Of The Monkey	Mike	Alternative hip hop
23	Shadow Gallery (Reissue)	Shadow Gallery	Progressive metal; progressive rock
23	SZNZ: Winter (EP)	Weezer	Alternative rock; rock; pop rock
30	Sleepwalker	The Anix	Electronic rock; alternative rock
30	Alliance (Reissue)	Damon Edge	Punk rock; rock
30	Broken Gargoyles	Diamanda Galas	Jazz; classical crossover
30	Cause Schoolly D Is Crazy	Schoolly D	Hip hop; gangsta rap

== Top songs on record ==
=== Billboard Hot 100 No. 1 Songs ===
- "About Damn Time" – Lizzo (2 weeks)
- "All I Want for Christmas Is You" – Mariah Carey (2 weeks in 2019, 2 weeks in 2020, 2 weeks in 2021, 5 weeks in 2022)
- "Anti-Hero" – Taylor Swift (6 weeks)
- "As It Was" – Harry Styles (15 weeks)
- "Bad Habit" – Steve Lacy (3 weeks)
- "Break My Soul" – Beyoncé (2 weeks)
- "Easy on Me" – Adele (7 weeks in 2021, 3 weeks in 2022)
- "First Class" – Jack Harlow (3 weeks)
- "Heat Waves" – Glass Animals (5 weeks)
- "Jimmy Cooks" – Drake feat. 21 Savage (1 week)
- "Super Freaky Girl" – Nicki Minaj (1 week)
- "Unholy" – Sam Smith and Kim Petras (1 week)
- "Wait for U" – Future feat. Drake and Tems (1 week)
- "We Don't Talk About Bruno" – Encanto cast (5 weeks)

=== Billboard Hot 100 Top 20 Hits ===
All songs that reached the Top 20 on the Billboard Hot 100 chart during the year, complete with peak chart placement.

- "712PM" – Future (#8)
- "A Holly Jolly Christmas" – Burl Ives (#4)
- "ABCDEFU" – Gayle (#3)
- "About Damn Time" – Lizzo (#1)
- "Ahhh Ha" – Lil Durk (#18)
- "Alien Superstar" – Beyoncé (#19)
- "All I Want for Christmas Is You" – Mariah Carey (#1)
- "Anti-Hero" – Taylor Swift (#1)
- "As It Was" – Harry Styles (#1)
- "BackOutsideBoyz" – Drake (#9)
- "Bad Decisions" – Benny Blanco, BTS and Snoop Dogg (#10)
- "Bad Habit" – Steve Lacy (#1)
- "Bad Habits" – Ed Sheeran (#2 in 2021, #8 in 2022)
- "Bejeweled" – Taylor Swift (#6)
- "Big Energy" – Latto (#3)
- "Blind" – SZA (#12)
- "Boyfriend" – Dove Cameron (#16)
- "Break My Soul" – Beyoncé (#1)
- "Broadway Girls" – Lil Durk feat. Morgan Wallen (#14)
- "Broke Boys" – Drake and 21 Savage (#12)
- "Bussin" – Nicki Minaj and Lil Baby (#20)
- "California Breeze" – Lil Baby (#4)
- "Calling My Name" – Drake (#20)
- "Christmas (Baby Please Come Home)" – Darlene Love (#15)
- "Circo Loco" – Drake and 21 Savage (#8)
- "Cold Heart (Pnau remix)" – Elton John and Dua Lipa (#7)
- "Cooped Up" – Post Malone feat. Roddy Ricch (#12)
- "Count Me Out" – Kendrick Lamar (#20)
- "Creepin'" – Metro Boomin, The Weeknd and 21 Savage (#5)
- "Cuff It" – Beyoncé (#13)
- "Daylight" – Harry Styles (#13)
- "Deck the Halls" – Nat King Cole (#16)
- "Después de la Playa" – Bad Bunny (#6)
- "Die for You" – The Weeknd (#12)
- "Die Hard" – Kendrick Lamar, Blxst and Amanda Reifer (#5)
- "Do We Have a Problem?" – Nicki Minaj and Lil Baby (#2)
- "Don't Think Jesus" – Morgan Wallen (#7)
- "Easy on Me" – Adele (#1)
- "Enemy" – Imagine Dragons and JID (#5)
- "Falling Back" – Drake (#7)
- "Fancy Like" – Walker Hayes (#3 in 2021, #16 in 2022)
- "Father Time" – Kendrick Lamar feat. Sampha (#11)
- "Feliz Navidad" – José Feliciano (#6 in 2021, #8 in 2022)
- "Fingers Crossed" – Lauren Spencer-Smith (#19)
- "First Class" – Jack Harlow (#1)
- "Forever" – Lil Baby feat. Fridayy (#8)
- "Get Into It (Yuh)" – Doja Cat (#20)
- "God Did" – DJ Khaled feat. Rick Ross, Lil Wayne, Jay-Z, John Legend and Fridayy (#17)
- "Good 4 U" – Olivia Rodrigo (#1 in 2021, #15 in 2022)
- "Ghost" – Justin Bieber (#5)
- "Glimpse of Us" – Joji (#8)
- "Grapejuice" – Harry Styles (#15)
- "Happy Holiday / The Holiday Season" – Andy Williams (#18 in 2021, #20 in 2022)
- "Heat Waves" – Glass Animals (#1)
- "Hold Me Closer" – Elton John and Britney Spears (#6)
- "Hot Shit" – Cardi B, Kanye West and Lil Durk (#13)
- "Hours in Silence" – Drake and 21 Savage (#11)
- "Hrs and Hrs" – Muni Long (#16)
- "I Ain't Worried" – OneRepublic (#6)
- "I Guess It's Fuck Me" – Drake (#19)
- "I Like You (A Happier Song)" – Post Malone feat. Doja Cat (#3)
- "I'm Dat Nigga" – Future (#10)
- "I'm Good (Blue)" – David Guetta and Bebe Rexha (#7)
- "I'm on One" – Future feat. Drake (#11)
- "In a Minute" – Lil Baby (#14)
- "Industry Baby" – Lil Nas X and Jack Harlow (#1 in 2021, #6 in 2022)
- "It's Beginning to Look a Lot Like Christmas" – Perry Como and The Fontane Sisters with Mitchell Ayres and His Orchestra (#12 in 2020, #13 in 2022)
- "It's the Most Wonderful Time of the Year" – Andy Williams (#5 in 2021, #6 in 2022)
- "Jimmy Cooks" – Drake feat. 21 Savage (#1)
- "Jingle Bell Rock" – Bobby Helms (#3)
- "Jumbotron Shit Poppin" – Drake (#16)
- "Karma" – Taylor Swift (#9)
- "Keep It Burnin" – Future feat. Kanye West (#15)
- "Kill Bill" – SZA (#3)
- "Kiss Me More" – Doja Cat feat. SZA (#3 in 2021, #19 in 2022)
- "Labyrinth" – Taylor Swift (#14)
- "Last Christmas" – Wham! (#5)
- "Late Night Talking" – Harry Styles (#3)
- "Lavender Haze" – Taylor Swift (#2)
- "Let It Snow, Let It Snow, Let It Snow" – Dean Martin (#8 in 2021, #12 in 2022)
- "Levitating" – Dua Lipa feat. DaBaby (#2 in 2021, #12 in 2022)
- "Lift Me Up" – Rihanna (#2)
- "Little Freak" – Harry Styles (#14)
- "Love You Better" – Future (#12)
- "Low" – SZA (#17)
- "Major Distribution" – Drake and 21 Savage (#3)
- "Mamiii" – Becky G and Karol G (#15)
- "Maroon" – Taylor Swift (#3)
- "Massaging Me" – Future (#20)
- "Massive" – Drake (#14)
- "Mastermind" – Taylor Swift (#13)
- "Matilda" – Harry Styles (#9)
- "Me Porto Bonito" – Bad Bunny and Chencho Corleone (#6)
- "Middle of the Ocean" – Drake (#15)
- "Midnight Rain" – Taylor Swift (#5)
- "More M's" – Drake and 21 Savage (#18)
- "Moscow Mule" – Bad Bunny (#4)
- "Music for a Sushi Restaurant" – Harry Styles (#8)
- "N95" – Kendrick Lamar (#3)
- "Nail Tech" – Jack Harlow (#18)
- "Need to Know" – Doja Cat (#8)
- "Never Hating" – Lil Baby and Young Thug (#19)
- "Nobody Gets Me" – SZA (#10)
- "Numb Little Bug" – Em Beihold (#18)
- "Oh My God" – Adele (#5 in 2021, #18 in 2022)
- "On BS" – Drake and 21 Savage (#4)
- "One Right Now" – Post Malone and The Weeknd (#6 in 2021, #17 in 2022)
- "Party" – Bad Bunny and Rauw Alejandro (#14)
- "Pop Out" – Lil Baby and Nardo Wick (#15)
- "Privileged Rappers" – Drake and 21 Savage (#7)
- "Puffin on Zootiez" – Future (#4)
- "Pushin P" – Gunna and Future feat. Young Thug (#7)
- "Pussy & Millions" – Drake and 21 Savage feat. Travis Scott (#6)
- "Question...?" – Taylor Swift (#7)
- "Real Spill" – Lil Baby (#10)
- "Rich Flex" – Drake and 21 Savage (#2)
- "Rich Spirit" – Kendrick Lamar (#13)
- "Right On" – Lil Baby (#13)
- "Rockin' Around the Christmas Tree" – Brenda Lee (#2)
- "Rudolph the Red-Nosed Reindeer" – Gene Autry (#16 in 2019, #19 in 2022)
- "Running Up That Hill (A Deal with God)" – Kate Bush (#3)
- "Sacrifice" – The Weeknd (#11)
- "Santa Tell Me" – Ariana Grande (#12)
- "Save Your Tears" – The Weeknd and Ariana Grande (#1 in 2021, #16 in 2022)
- "She Had Me at Heads Carolina" – Cole Swindell (#16)
- "Shirt" – SZA (#11)
- "Shivers" – Ed Sheeran (#4)
- "Silent Hill" – Kendrick Lamar and Kodak Black (#7)
- "Sleigh Ride" – The Ronettes (#10)
- "Smokin Out the Window" – Silk Sonic, Bruno Mars and Anderson .Paak (#5 in 2021, #13 in 2022)
- "Snow on the Beach" – Taylor Swift feat. Lana Del Rey (#4)
- "Something in the Orange" – Zach Bryan (#12)
- "Soy El Unico" – Yahritza y Su Esencia (#20)
- "Spin Bout U" – Drake and 21 Savage (#5)
- "Stay" – The Kid Laroi and Justin Bieber (#1 in 2021, #2 in 2022)
- "Staying Alive" – DJ Khaled feat. Drake and Lil Baby (#5)
- "Sticky" – Drake (#6)
- "Sunroof" – Nicky Youre and Dazy (#4)
- "Super Freaky Girl" – Nicki Minaj (#1)
- "Super Gremlin" – Kodak Black (#3)
- "Superhero (Heroes & Villains)" – Metro Boomin, Future and Chris Brown (#8)
- "Surface Pressure" – Jessica Darrow (#8)
- "Sweet Nothing" – Taylor Swift (#15)
- "Sweetest Pie" – Megan Thee Stallion and Dua Lipa (#15)
- "Tarot" – Bad Bunny and Jhay Cortez (#18)
- "Texts Go Green" – Drake (#13)
- "Thats What I Want" – Lil Nas X (#8)
- "The Christmas Song (Merry Christmas to You)" – Nat King Cole (#11)
- "The Family Madrigal" – Stephanie Beatriz, Olga Merediz and Encanto cast (#20)
- "The Heart Part 5" – Kendrick Lamar (#15)
- "The Kind of Love We Make" – Luke Combs (#8)
- "Thought You Should Know" – Morgan Wallen (#12)
- "Thousand Miles" – The Kid Laroi (#15)
- "'Til You Can't" – Cody Johnson (#18)
- "Tití Me Preguntó" – Bad Bunny (#5)
- "Tomorrow 2" – GloRilla and Cardi B (#9)
- "Too Easy" – Gunna and Future (#16)
- "Treacherous Twins" – Drake and 21 Savage (#14)
- "Un Ratito" – Bad Bunny (#16)
- "Under the Influence" – Chris Brown (#14)
- "Underneath the Tree" – Kelly Clarkson (#12 in 2021, #13 in 2022)
- "Unholy" – Sam Smith and Kim Petras (#1)
- "United in Grief" – Kendrick Lamar (#8)
- "Vegas" – Doja Cat (#10)
- "Vigilante Shit" – Taylor Swift (#10)
- "Wait for U" – Future feat. Drake and Tems (#1)
- "Wasted on You" – Morgan Wallen (#9 in 2021, #11 in 2022)
- "We Cry Together" – Kendrick Lamar and Taylour Paige (#16)
- "We Don't Talk About Bruno" – Encanto cast (#1)
- "White Christmas" – Bing Crosby (#12 in 1962, #18 in 2022)
- "Woman" – Doja Cat (#7)
- "Worldwide Steppers" – Kendrick Lamar (#19)
- "Would've, Could've, Should've" – Taylor Swift (#20)
- "Yet to Come" – BTS (#13)
- "You Proof" – Morgan Wallen (#5)
- "You're on Your Own, Kid" – Taylor Swift (#8)

== Deaths ==
- January 2 − Traxamillion, 42, hip hop producer
  - Jay Weaver, 42, Christian rock bassist
- January 4 − Jessie Daniels, 57, R&B singer
- January 5 − Dale Clevenger, 81, classical French hornist
- January 6 − Calvin Simon, 79, funk singer
- January 8 – Marilyn Bergman, 93, songwriter
  - Michael Lang, 77, tour promoter and producer
- January 9 − Maria Ewing, 71, opera singer
  - James Mtume, 76, jazz and R&B instrumentalist
- January 10 − Gerry Granahan, 89, rock and roll and pop singer
  - Khan Jamal, 75, jazz vibraphonist
- January 11 − Bruce Anderson, 72, experimental guitarist
  - Rosa Lee Hawkins, 76, pop and R&B singer
- January 12 − Everett Lee, 105, classical violinist and conductor
  - Ronnie Spector, 78, R&B and pop singer (The Ronettes)
- January 13 − CPO Boss Hogg, 52, rapper
  - Fred Parris, 85, doo-wop musician
  - Sonny Turner, 83, R&B singer
- January 14 − Dallas Frazier, 82, country singer songwriter
  - Greg Webster, 84, funk drummer
- January 15 − Ralph Emery, 88, disc jockey
  - Jon Lind, 73, folk rock and pop singer songwriter
  - Rachel Nagy, 37, blues rock singer
- January 18 − Dick Halligan, 78, jazz rock multi-instrumentalist
- January 20 – Meat Loaf, 74, rock singer
  - Tom Smith, 65, experimental rock multi-instrumentalist
- January 21 − Terry Tolkin, 62, music journalist and music executive who coined the term Alternative Music
- January 22 – Don Wilson, 88, instrumental rock and surf rock musician (The Ventures)
- January 23 − Beegie Adair, 84, jazz pianist
- January 29 − Sam Lay, 86, blues drummer
- January 30 − Philip Paul, 96, jazz blues and R&B drummer
  - Hargus Robbins, 84, country and rock pianist
- January 31 − Jimmy Johnson, 93, blues guitarist
- February 1 – Jon Zazula, 69, music industry executive
- February 2 − Willie Leacox, 74, folk rock drummer
  - Joe Diorio, 85, jazz guitarist
- February 6 − Syl Johnson, 85, blues guitarist
  - George Crumb, 92, classical composer
- February 8 − Bruce Greig, 54, death metal guitarist
- February 9 – Betty Davis, 76, funk and soul singer, songwriter
- February 11 – Mike Rabon, 78, rock singer and guitarist
- February 12 – Howard Grimes, 80, soul drummer
- February 13 – King Louie Bankston, 49, power pop singer, songwriter and guitarist
- February 14 – Sandy Nelson, 83, rock and roll drummer
  - Roger Segal, 49, punk rock bassist
- February 16 – Bob DeMeo, 66, jazz drummer
- February 17 – David Tyson, 62, R&B singer
- February 18 – Scotty Wray, 64, country music singer
- February 19 – Nightbirde, 31, pop singer
- February 20 – Sam Henry, 65, punk rock drummer
- February 22 – Mark Lanegan, 57, alternative rock singer songwriter
- February 26 − Snootie Wild, 36, rapper
- March 1 − Warner Mack, 86, country singer-songwriter
  - Richard Pratt, R&B singer
- March 2 − Chuck Criss, 36, indie-folk musician (Freelance Whales)
- March 4 − Jimbeau Hinson, 70, country singer-songwriter
- March 5 − Jeff Howell, 60, rock bassist (Outlaws)
- March 6 − Mike Cross, 57, alternative rock guitarist
- March 8 −
  - John Dean, 80, blue-eyed soul singer (The Reflections)
  - Grandpa Elliott, 77, soul and blues singer
- March 9 − Richard Podolor, 86, rock and roll guitarist
- March 10 − Bobbie Nelson, 91, country music singer, pianist
- March 11 − Brad Martin, 48, country singer
  - Timmy Thomas, 77, soul singer
- March 12 – Traci Braxton, 50, singer (The Braxtons)
  - Barry Bailey, 73, rock guitarist
  - Jessica Williams, 73, jazz pianist
- March 15 – Dennis Gonzalez, 67, free jazz trumpter
  - Barbara Maier Gustern, 82, vocal coach and jazz singer
- March 16 – Barbara Morrison, 72, jazz singer
  - Bobby Weinstein, 82, pop songwriter
- March 21 − LaShun Pace, 60, gospel singer
- March 25 – Taylor Hawkins, 50, drummer, singer (Foo Fighters)
  - Bobby Hendricks, 84, R&B singer
  - Keith Martin, 55, R&B singer
- March 26 – Jeff Carson, 58, country music singer
  - Keaton Price, 31, post-hardcore singer
- March 30 – Francisco Gonzalez, 68, rock mandolinist and harpist
- March 31 – Fred Johnson, 80, doo-wop singer
- April 1 – C. W. McCall, 93, country singer
  - Ronald White, 83, bluegrass mandolinist
- April 4 – Joe Messina, 93, R&B guitarist
- April 5 – Bobby Rydell, 79, rock and roll singer
  - Paul Siebel, 83, country rock singer, songwriter, guitarist
- April 9 – John Rossi, 79, rock and roll drummer
- April 12 – David Reel, 64, indie rock singer and guitarist
- April 13 – Tim Feerick, 34, rock bassist (Dance Gavin Dance)
- April 17 – Roderick Clark, 49, R&B singer
  - Hollis Resnik, 67, musical theater singer and actress
- April 18 – Nicholas Angelich, 51, classical pianist
- April 20 – Guitar Shorty, 89, blues guitarist
- April 25 – Andrew Woolfolk, 71, R&B saxophonist
- April 26 – Randy Rand, 62, hard rock bassist
- April 27 – Judy Henske, 85, folk singer-songwriter
- April 29 – Allen Blairman, 81, jazz drummer
- April 30 – Naomi Judd, 76, country singer-songwriter (The Judds)
  - Gabe Serbian, 44, hardcore punk guitarist and drummer
- May 4 – Howie Pyro, 61, punk rock bassist
- May 6 – Jewell, 56, R&B singer
- May 7 – Mickey Gilley, 86, country singer-songwriter
- May 11 – Trevor Strnad, 41, melodic death metal singer (The Black Dahlia Murder)
- May 13 – Lil Keed, 24, rapper
- May 18 – Bob Neuwirth, 82, singer songwriter
- May 19 – Bernard Wright, 58, jazz funk singer and keyboardist
- May 23 – Thom Bresh, 74, country singer
- May 29 – Ronnie Hawkins, 87, rock and roll singer
- May 30 – Paul Vance, 92, songwriter and record producer
- May 31 – Ingram Marshall, 80, classical composer
  - Kelly Joe Phelps, 62, blues singer songwriter and slide guitarist
  - Dave Smith, 72, sound engineer
- June 1 − Deborah McCrary, 67, gospel singer (The McCrary Sisters)
- June 2 – Hal Bynum, 87, country songwriter
- June 4 – Trouble, 34, rapper
  - Alec John Such, 70, rock bassist (Bon Jovi)
- June 6 – Jim Seals, 79, rock singer (Seals and Crofts)
- June 9 – Julee Cruise, 65, dream pop singer
- June 12 – Gabe Baltazar, 92, jazz saxophonist
- June 14 – Joel Whitburn, 82, charts historian
- June 19 – Jim Schwall, 79, blues singer songwriter and guitarist
  - Brett Tuggle, 70, rock keyboardist
- June 22 – Patrick Adams, 72, disco arranger and producer
- July 7 – Adam Wade, 87, pop singer
- July 14 – William Hart, 77, R&B singer (The Delfonics)
- July 16 – Idris Phillips, 64, jazz and folk pianist
- July 18 – Vincent DeRosa, 101, classical French hornist
- July 19 –
  - Michael Henderson, 71, singer and bass player
  - Q Lazzarus, 61, singer
- July 24 – Bob Heathcote, 58, crossover thrash bassist
- July 27 – JayDaYoungan, 24, rapper
- July 29 – Jim Sohns, 75, rock singer
- July 31 – Mo Ostin, 95, record producer
- August 4 – Sam Gooden, 87, soul singer
- August 5 – Michael Lang, 80, jazz and classical pianist
- August 6 – David Muse, 73, rock musician
- August 8 – Lamont Dozier, 81, songwriter and record producer
- August 10 – Abdul Wadud, 75, jazz and classical cellist
- August 11 – Bill Pitman, 102, jazz pop and rock guitarist
- August 16 – Kal David, 79, blues singer and guitarist
- August 19 – Ted Kirkpatrick, 62, Christian thrash metal drummer and songwriter
- August 21 – Monnette Sudler, 70, jazz guitarist
- August 22 – Jerry Allison, 82, rock drummer (The Crickets)
  - Jaimie Branch, 39, free jazz trumpter and composer
- August 25 – Mable John, 91, R&B singer
  - Joey DeFrancesco, 51, jazz organist saxophonist and trumpter
- August 29 – Luke Bell, 32, country singer-songwriter
- September 4 – Wes Freed, 58, artist and album cover designer
- September 7 – Dave Sherman, 55, doom metal bassist
- September 8 – Sonny West, 85, rockabilly singer, songwriter, guitarist
- September 9 – Herschel Sizemore, 87, bluegrass mandolinist
- September 10 – Jorja Fleezanis, 70, classical violinist
  - Paulino Bernal, 83, Tex-Mex accordionist
- September 12 – PnB Rock, 30, rapper
  - Ramsey Lewis, 87, jazz pianist and composer
- September 13 – Jesse Powell, 51, R&B singer
- September 14 – Jim Post, folk singer-songwriter
- September 16 – Marva Hicks, 66, soul singer
- September 21 – Anton Fier, 66, alternative rock drummer
  - Ray Edenton, 95, country and rock guitarist
- September 22 – John Hartman, 72, rock drummer
- September 24 – Pharoah Sanders, 81, jazz saxophonist
  - Sue Mingus, 92, record producer
- September 26 – Joe Bussard, 86, record collector
- September 28 – Coolio, 59, rapper
- October 1 – Kevin Locke, 68, folk flautist
- October 2 – Mary McCaslin, 75, singer songwriter
- October 4 – Loretta Lynn, 90, country music singer, songwriter
- October 5 – Lenny Lipton, 82, folk lyricist
- October 6 –
  - Jody Miller, 80, country music singer
  - Fred Catero, 89, record producer and engineer
  - Ivy Jo Hunter, 82, R&B singer
  - Judy Tenuta, 65, comedy music singer songwriter
- October 7 –
  - Ronnie Cuber, 80, jazz saxophonist
  - Art Laboe, 97, radio disc jockey
- October 8 – Charlie Brown, 80, radio disc jockey
- October 9 – Chuck Deardorf, 68, jazz bassist
- October 10 – Anita Kerr, 94, country and pop singer and arranger
- October 11 – Willie Spence, 23, R&B singer
- October 12 – Monsta O, 56, rapper
- October 13 –
  - Mike Schank, 56, film composer and guitarist
  - Joyce Sims, 63, R&B singer
- October 15 – Marty Sammon, 45, blues and ragtime keyboardist
- October 18 – Robert Gordon, 75, rockabilly singer
- October 19 – Joanna Simon, 84, opera singer
- October 20 –
  - Bettye Crutcher, 83, R&B singer
  - Lucy Simon, 82, composer and folk singer
- October 21 – Robert Gordy, 91, music publishing executive and recording artist
- October 23 – Don Edwards, 86, western singer
- October 24 – Gregg Philbin, 74, rock bassist
- October 25 –
  - Paul Stoddard, 51, metalcore singer
  - Jules Bass, 87, lyricist
- October 28 –
  - Jerry Lee Lewis, 87, rock and roll singer
  - D.H. Peligro, 63, punk rock drummer
- October 30 – Anthony Ortega, 94, jazz clarinetist
- October 31 – Patrick Hagerty, 78, country singer
- November 1 –
  - Takeoff, 28, rapper (Migos)
  - Joseph Tarsia, 88, recording engineer and studio owner
- November 5 –
  - Aaron Carter, 34, pop singer and rapper
  - Mimi Parker, 55, indie rock singer and drummer (Low)
  - Tame One, 52, rapper
- November 6 – Hurricane G, 52, rapper
- November 7 – Jeff Cook, 73, country musician (Alabama)
- November 12 – Gene Cipriano, 94, jazz and pop woodwindist
- November 16 – Mick Goodrick, 77, jazz guitarist
- November 17 – B. Smyth, 28, R&B singer
- November 18 – Ned Rorem, 99, classical composer
- November 19 – Danny Kalb, 80, blues guitarist (The Blues Project)
- November 25 –
  - Irene Cara, 63, singer
  - Charles Koppelman, 82, record executive (SBK Records)
  - Don Newkirk, 56, film composer and record producer
- November 26 – Louise Tobin, 104, jazz singer
- December 4 – Bob McGrath, 90, musician
- December 5 – Jim Stewart, 92, record producer (Stax Records)
- December 10 – J. J. Barnes, 79, R&B singer
- December 11 – Angelo Badalamenti, 85, composer and arranger
- December 13 – Stephen "tWitch" Boss, 40, DJ and dancer
- December 15 – Dino Danelli, 78, rock drummer (The Young Rascals)
- December 16 – Charlie Gracie, 86, rock and roll singer
- December 22 – Big Scarr, 22, rapper
- December 31 – Anita Pointer, 74, singer, songwriter (The Pointer Sisters)
  - Jeremiah Green, 45, indie rock drummer (Modest Mouse)

== See also ==
- 2022 in music
