= Stand on It =

Stand on It may refer to:

- "Stand on It" (Bruce Springsteen song)
- "Stand on It" (Lil Baby song)
- "Stand on It" (Yeat song)
- "Stand on It" (Jeff Beck song), from his 1989 album Jeff Beck's Guitar Shop
