= Heyy =

2022 single by Lil Baby

"Heyy (Song)"

Single by Lil Baby

from the album It's Only Me
- Released: October 10, 2022
- Recorded: 2022
- Genre: Trap
- Length: 3:12
- Label: Quality Control; Motown; 4PF; Wolfpack
- Songwriters: Dominique Jones; Ryan Hartlove; Henri Velasco; Leon Lightfoot III
- Producers: Harto; Hoops; King LeeBoy

Lil Baby singles chronology
"Detox" (2022)	"Heyy (Song)" (2022)	"Go Hard" (2023)

Music video
- "Heyy" on YouTube

"Heyy" is a song by American rapper Lil Baby, released on October 10, 2022, as the second single from his third studio album It's Only Me (2022). The song was produced by Harto, Hoops and King LeeBoy.

== Composition ==
In the song, Lil Baby melodically recounts his several encounters with different women, his social background, and the advice he received along the way.

== Critical reception ==
Writing for The Fader, Jordan Darville gave a positive review of the song, writing, "If you read it in a text message, the word 'Heyy' could come off as shy or even noncommital. That's not the tack Baby takes on 'Heyy,' bragging about his roster of girls and nodding to his origins on the streets of Atlanta as fuel to drive his domination of the rap game. It gives the chorus, where Baby sounds coy as he repeats the title, a dry kind of humor that I really enjoy." Conversely, Tom Breihan gave a negative review, describing it as "mushy and lifeless" and the beat as sounding like a "completely standard Lil Baby beat". He also wrote, "Over that track, Baby goes into autopilot. He gets off a couple of decent lines, and the 'heyy' part of the hook is pretty fun, but this one's not working for me. Maybe it’ll prove to be a grower. Probably not."

== Music video ==
An official music video was directed by Ivan Berrios and released alongside the single. It shows Lil Baby sitting at a wooden desk with stacks of cash on top and counting them with a money counter while surrounded by women. He is also seen standing among clones of him, with a fleet of cars, and on a platform in the middle of the ocean surrounded by alligators.

== Charts ==
=== Weekly charts ===
Weekly chart performance for "Heyy"
Chart (2022)	Peak position
Canada Hot 100 (Billboard)	45
Global 200 (Billboard)	38
South Africa Streaming (TOSAC)	48
US Billboard Hot 100	21
US Hot R&B/Hip-Hop Songs (Billboard)	10
US Rhythmic Airplay (Billboard)	17

=== Year-end charts ===
Year-end chart performance for "Heyy"
Chart (2023)	Position
US Hot R&B/Hip-Hop Songs (Billboard)	73

== Certifications ==
Certifications for "Heyy"
Region	Certification	Certified units/sales
United States (RIAA)	Platinum	1,000,000^{‡}
^{‡} Sales+streaming figures based on certification alone.
