= Nostalghia (musician) =

American singer

Ciscandra Nostalghia
- Origin: Southern California, United States
- Genre: Indie folk, gothic rock, indie rock, electronic, alternative rock, ambient
- Instrument: Vocals
- Website: www.nostalghiamusic.com

Ciscandra Nostalghia, known by her stage name Nostalghia, is an American singer and songwriter.

In 2014, she released her first album, Chrysalis, written with collaborator and multi-instrumentalist Roy Gnan. Nostalghia co-wrote and performed two songs for the 2017 film John Wick: Chapter 2. She also appeared in the film. In 2018, Nostalghia released the single "Little White Moment".

== Early life ==
Nostalghia was born in Southern California and raised by her Persian mother and her father, who is of Russian heritage.

== Discography ==
Studio LPs

- I Am Robot Hear Me Glitch (2010)
- Chrysalis (2014)
- Imago (2018)

EPs

- B Sides for the Brokenhearted: Vol 1 (2018)
- Wicked Woman (2019)

Singles

- "Who You Talkin' To Man?" (2014)
- "God Be You" (2017)
- "Plastic Heart" (2017)
- "Coronation" (2017)
- "Little White Moment" (2018)

== Touring ==
2014 Festivals

- Soundwave, February–March 2014
- Austin City Limits, September 2014
- Sunset Strip Music Festival, September 2014
- Riot Fest, October 2014

2014 Tours

- with 30 Seconds to Mars, January 2014
- with Crosses†††, May 2014
- with AFI, October 2014

2015 Tours

- with TV on the Radio, April 2015

2017 Tours

- with Poptone, May 2017
