= It's Only Me =

2022 studio album by Lil Baby

Studio album by Lil Baby
- Released: October 14, 2022
- Genre: Hip-hop; trap
- Length: 65:06
- Label: Quality Control; Motown; Wolfpack; 4PF
- Producer: Anthony Palmer; ATL Jacob; Awavy; Ayo Sim; B. March; Bizness Boi; Chi Chi; Chosen 1; Cubeatz; DJ Champ; DY; Ele Beatz; Eza; Figurez Made It; Flex on the Beat; FnZ; Fortune; FranchiseDidIt; Fridayy; G1; Harto; Haze; Hoops; Josh Coleman; Juko; Kaigoinkrazy; King LeeBoy; LilJuMadeDaBeat; Mars; Mattazik Muzik; Murda Beatz; Nicoonthekeys; Saj; Sean Momberger; Sevn Thomas; ShortyyK; Sir Fredo; Tay Keith; Trademark; Wheezy; YC

Lil Baby chronology
The Voice of the Heroes (2021)	It's Only Me (2022)	WHAM (2025)

Singles from It's Only Me
- 1. "In a Minute" Released: April 8, 2022; 2. "Heyy" Released: October 10, 2022

It's Only Me is the third studio album by American rapper Lil Baby. It was released on October 14, 2022 through Quality Control Music, Motown, Wolfpack, and 4 Pockets Full. The album features guest appearances from Nardo Wick, Young Thug, Fridayy, Future, Rylo Rodriguez, Jeremih, EST Gee, and Pooh Shiesty. It was supported by two singles: "In a Minute" and "Heyy".

== Promotion and release ==
On April 8, 2022, Lil Baby released the lead single of the album "In a Minute". The rapper first teased the album in August 2022 on his social media. On September 2, 2022, he announced the title and release date of the album. The day also saw the release of the non-album single "Detox". The cover art depicts different stages of Lil Baby's life as an allusion to Mount Rushmore. The visual serves as a response to protests over his inclusion on Mount Rushmore-murals which included him over other Atlanta rappers. On October 10, 2022, he released the second single of the album, "Heyy", and revealed the tracklist.

== Critical reception ==
Professional ratings
Aggregate scores
Source	Rating
Metacritic	66/100
Review scores
Source	Rating
AllMusic	3/5 stars
Clash	8/10
NME	3/5 stars
Pitchfork	5.5/10
Rolling Stone	4/5 stars

It's Only Me received generally mixed to positive reviews from critics. At Metacritic, which assigns a normalized rating out of 100 to reviews from professional publications, the album received an average score of 66, based on nine reviews, indicating "generally favorable reviews".

In a positive review, Clash wrote, "This album undoubtedly sees Lil Baby solidify his spot and reaffirm the greatness he’s presented the past few years," adding, "It captures the trials of his journey so far whilst celebrating his current success and the gross potential to do even more." Alphonse Pierre of Pitchfork was more mixed, writing, "Lil Baby is at his best when he's using [his] tricks to switch between moods, but there's just one on It's Only Me, and it’s indifference: not in the too-cool-to-care kind of way, but in the way when words have no weight behind them."

In a review for AllMusic, it was claimed that, "Baby approaching nearly every track with repetitive flows and lyrics that feel disconnected and static. Ultimately It's Only Me sticks to the formula that's taken Lil Baby to the top, but somehow fails to communicate the personality and creative fire that was hard to miss on earlier albums." Similarly, NME's Niall Smith declared that, "If the trimmings were removed from ‘It’s Only Me’, it might rival his previous releases – instead it’s a few notches shy of greatness."

In a more positive review for Rolling Stone, Jayson Buford stated that, "Most of the time, Baby is in prime form here — technical enough to earn his hip-hop cred, and stylistic enough to keep the uncommon kids from feeling like he’s common. When he’s at his best, it’s best to let him gobble you whole."

== Commercial performance ==
It's Only Me debuted atop the US Billboard 200 dated October 29, 2022, earning 216,000 album-equivalent units (including 6,500 pure album sales) in its first week of availability in the United States. The album earned a total of 288.97 million official streams for its tracks, the third-highest figure for one-week streams for an album in 2022. It is Lil Baby's third US number-one album.

== Track listing ==
It's Only Me track listing
No.	Title	Writer(s)	Producer(s)	Length
1.	"Real Spill"	Dominique Jones; Jeuan Tabarrejo; Kai Hasegawa; Helen Adu; Ben Travers	G1; Kaigoinkrazy	3:18
2.	"Stand on It"	Jones; Joseph Nguyen; Matthew Robinson; Nico Scheidegger	Figurez Made It; Mattazik Muzik; Nicoonthekeys	2:46
3.	"Pop Out" (featuring Nardo Wick)	Jones; Horace Walls III; Tyler Maline; Moritz Busch; Alexander Monro; Pippa Yurk	Trademark; ShortyyK; Eza	3:15
4.	"Heyy"	Jones; Ryan Hartlove; Henri Velasco; Leon Lightfoot III	Harto; Hoops; King LeeBoy	3:12
5.	"California Breeze"	Jones; Shane Lindstrom; Marcel Korkutata; Cecilie Karshøj; James Litherland	Murda Beatz; Mars	2:57
6.	"Perfect Timing"	Jones; Christopher Pearson	YC	2:41
7.	"Never Hating" (with Young Thug)	Jones; Jeffrey Williams; Wesley Glass; Frédéric Lapointe; Eelis Oikarinen	Wheezy; Sir Fredo; Ele Beatz	2:40
8.	"Forever" (featuring Fridayy)	Jones; Tavoris Hollins; Francis LeBlanc; Andre Robertson; Rodney Montreal	Fridayy; Bizness Boi; Fortune	2:47
9.	"Not Finished"	Jones; Dwan Avery; Bryson March; Cameron March	DY; B. March	2:43
10.	"In a Minute"	Jones; Hasegawa; Ethan Hayes; Ellie Goulding; Jim Eliot; Howard New	Kaigoinkrazy; Haze	3:20
11.	"Waterfall Flow"	Jones; Jacob Canady; Simarpreet Bahia	ATL Jacob; Ayo Sim	2:44
12.	"Everything"	Jones; Matthew Samuels; Rupert Thomas, Jr.; Sean Momberger	Sevn Thomas; Sean Momberger	2:20
13.	"From Now On" (featuring Future)	Jones; Nayvadius Wilburn; Rodrick Moore Jr.; Brytavious Chambers; Lindstrom; Jordan Holt-May	Tay Keith; Murda Beatz	2:59
14.	"Double Down"	Jones; Lindstrom; Adrian Nielsen	Murda Beatz; Awavy	3:22
15.	"Cost to Be Alive" (with Rylo Rodriguez)	Jones; Ryan Adams; Tabarrejo; Gorelov Aleksandrovich; Albert Willemetz; Jacques Charles; Maurice Yvain; Channing Pollock	G1; Chosen 1	2:19
16.	"Top Priority"	Jones; Hampton Sallee III; Jacob Sclaver	DJ Champ; Juko	3:07
17.	"Danger"	Jones; Hartlove; Anton Gololobov; William Boyette	Harto; Anthony Palmer	2:31
18.	"Stop Playin" (featuring Jeremih)	Jones; Jeremy Felton; Lindstrom; Michael Mulé; Isaac De Boni; Catharina Stoltenberg; Henriette Motzfeldt	Murda Beatz; FnZ	2:37
19.	"FR"	Jones; Hasegawa; Hayes; Josh Coleman	Kaigoinkrazy; Haze; Coleman	2:55
20.	"Back and Forth" (with EST Gee)	Jones; George Stone III; Chambers	Tay Keith	2:01
21.	"Shiest Talk" (featuring Pooh Shiesty)	Jones; Lontrell Williams Jr.; Julian Mason; Kelton Scott II	LilJuMadeDaBeat; FranchiseDidIt	2:03
22.	"No Fly Zone"	Jones; Chidi Osondu; Kevin Gomringer; Tim Gomringer	Chi Chi; Cubeatz	3:34
23.	"Russian Roulette"	Jones; Aaron Butler; Sajeethan Sakthivel	Flex on the Beat; Saj	2:55
Total length:				65:06

Notes

- "Stop Playin" interpolates "Flashing", performed by Smerz
- ''Pop Out'', sometimes is labeled as by Lil Baby and Nardo Wick, but usually labeled as featuring.

== Charts ==
=== Weekly charts ===
Weekly chart performance for It's Only Me
Chart (2022–2024)	Peak position
Australian Albums (ARIA)	7
Austrian Albums (Ö3 Austria)	8
Belgian Albums (Ultratop Flanders)	11
Belgian Albums (Ultratop Wallonia)	34
Canadian Albums (Billboard)	1
Danish Albums (Hitlisten)	7
Dutch Albums (Album Top 100)	2
Finnish Albums (Suomen virallinen lista)	30
French Albums (SNEP)	36
German Albums (Offizielle Top 100)	24
Irish Albums (OCC)	6
Italian Albums (FIMI)	29
Lithuanian Albums (AGATA)	23
New Zealand Albums (RMNZ)	8
Nigeria Albums (TurnTable)	21
Norwegian Albums (VG-lista)	5
Spanish Albums (Promusicae)	56
Swedish Albums (Sverigetopplistan)	22
Swiss Albums (Schweizer Hitparade)	4
UK Albums (OCC)	3
UK R&B Albums (OCC)	24
US Billboard 200	1
US Top R&B/Hip-Hop Albums (Billboard)	1

=== Year-end charts ===
2022 year-end chart performance for It's Only Me
Chart (2022)	Position
US Billboard 200	124
US Top R&B/Hip-Hop Albums (Billboard)	43

2023 year-end chart performance for It's Only Me
Chart (2023)	Position
US Billboard 200	13
US Top R&B/Hip-Hop Albums (Billboard)	5

2024 year-end chart performance for It's Only Me
Chart (2024)	Position
US Billboard 200	186
US Top R&B/Hip-Hop Albums (Billboard)	85

== Certifications ==
Certifications and sales for It's Only Me
Region	Certification	Certified units/sales
United Kingdom (BPI)	Gold	100,000^{‡}
United States (RIAA)	Platinum	1,000,000^{‡}
^{‡} Sales+streaming figures based on certification alone.
