= Stand on It (Lil Baby song) =

2022 song by Lil Baby

Song by Lil Baby

from the album It's Only Me
- Released: October 14, 2022
- Length: 2:46
- Label: Quality Control; Motown; Wolfpack; 4PF
- Songwriters: Dominique Jones; Joseph Nguyen; Matthew Robinson; Nico Scheidegger
- Producers: Figurez Made It; Mattazik Muzik; Nicoonthekeys

Music video
- "Stand on It" on YouTube

"Stand on It" is a song by American rapper Lil Baby from his third studio album It's Only Me (2022). It was produced by Figurez Made It, Mattazik Muzik and Nicoonthekeys.

== Composition and lyrics ==
The song contains a "Memphis-esque" beat with a g-funk bassline, over which Lil Baby reflects on his life before fame, recalling times he was shooting dice and selling marijuana. In addition, he centers on his loyalty to his loved ones and being wealthy and admired in the present.

Lil Baby also raps in the song, "I don't want your bitch, we can't swap out". Many believed this line to be a response to rapper Quavo's remark on an Instagram post in 2021 addressing rumors of Baby dating his ex-girlfriend and fellow rapper Saweetie: "Ain't trippin we can swap it out!"

== Critical reception ==
The song received generally positive reviews from critics. Shanté Collier-McDermott of Clash called the lyrics "cleverly braggadocious bars". Niall Smith of NME considered the song as part of the "weighty momentum" of It's Only Me. Joshua Robinson of HotNewHipHop commented it "picks up the tempo and injects a welcomed dose of energy into It's Only Me's opening stretch, but self-aware lyrics like 'I'm tryna touch me a billi', still hustle like I'm on zero/Really done saved some n*ggas, that's why they call me the hero' prove just how focused and hungry Lil Baby is on his third studio outing."

== Music video ==
An official music video, directed by Wham and Keemotion, premiered on October 17, 2022. It opens with Lil Baby arriving at a forest reserve, where he places his money and other items into the trunk of his truck, changes into an aquamarine outfit and puts on jewelry before mounting an all-terrain vehicle. The clip shows him riding around his hometown with his crew in ATVs.

== Charts ==
Chart performance for "Stand on It"
Chart (2022)	Peak position
Canada Hot 100 (Billboard)	44
Global 200 (Billboard)	36
South Africa Streaming (TOSAC)	36
US Billboard Hot 100	22
US Hot R&B/Hip-Hop Songs (Billboard)	11

== Certifications ==
Certifications for "Stand on It"
Region	Certification	Certified units/sales
United States (RIAA)	Gold	500,000^{‡}
^{‡} Sales+streaming figures based on certification alone.
