= Real Spill =

2022 song by Lil Baby

Song by Lil Baby

from the album It's Only Me
- Released: October 14, 2022
- Length: 3:18
- Label: Quality Control; Motown; Wolfpack; 4PF
- Songwriters: Dominique Jones; Jeuan Tabarrejo; Kai Hasegawa; Helen Adu; Ben Travers
- Producers: G1; Kaigoinkrazy

"Real Spill" is a song by American rapper Lil Baby and the opening track of his third studio album It's Only Me (2022). Produced by G1 and Kaigoinkrazy, it samples "The Big Unknown" by English band Sade. The song peaked at number 10 on the Billboard Hot 100.

== Content ==
The song revolves around how Lil Baby's life is different from what it had been in the past, as well as his pressures of being a role model and the results of him being in a higher social position.

== Critical reception ==
Marcus Shorter of Consequence gave a positive review, writing that It's Only Me "starts promising enough" with the song. Brandon Yu of Variety praised the sampling in the song, writing that it "briefly seems to promise something newly earnest or ambitious", but then wrote, "The moment is short-lived, as a nameless set of hi-hats and lifeless 808s take the wheel, and the typical Baby sound washes over. Despite the story that could have been told about the dizzying turn that the last couple years undoubtedly have been, Baby has nothing compelling to say about his life here. On the opening track, the most vivid he gets comes down to clunky bars about his newfound A-list status: 'Got my name from the ghetto / But I'm bigger now / I can go to dinner with Corey Gamble and Miss Jenner now.'" Shanté Collier-McDermott of Clash wrote favorably the use of the sample, describing it as "Sombre sounding but expertly setting the tone." Like Shorter, Niall Smith of NME also wrote that the album "starts strong" with the track, which he called "a street-cured motivational anthem populated with cautionary tales and status-affirming quotables".

== Charts ==
Chart performance for "Real Spill"
Chart (2022)	Peak position
Canada Hot 100 (Billboard)	32
Global 200 (Billboard)	21
Ireland (IRMA)	67
New Zealand Hot Singles (RMNZ)	12
South Africa Streaming (TOSAC)	18
UK Singles (OCC)	36
US Billboard Hot 100	10
US Hot R&B/Hip-Hop Songs (Billboard)	5

== Certifications ==
Certifications for "Real Spill"
Region	Certification	Certified units/sales
United States (RIAA)	Gold	500,000^{‡}
^{‡} Sales+streaming figures based on certification alone.
