= Pop Out (Lil Baby and Nardo Wick song) =

2022 song by Lil Baby and Nardo Wick

Song by Lil Baby featuring Nardo Wick

from the album It's Only Me
- Released: October 14, 2022
- Length: 3:15
- Label: Quality Control; Motown
- Songwriters: Dominique Jones; Horace Walls III; Alexander Monro; Tyler Maline; Moritz Busch; Pippa Yurk
- Producers: Trademark; ShortyyK; Eza

Music video
- "Pop Out" on YouTube

"Pop Out" is a song by American rapper Lil Baby featuring fellow rapper Nardo Wick from the former's third studio album It's Only Me (2022). It was produced by Trademark, ShortyyK and Eza. The song is the second collaboration between the artists, after "Me or Sum".

== Composition ==
The song finds Lil Baby boasting about his accomplishments as he addresses his rivals, and features a beat switch.

== Critical reception ==
The song received generally positive reviews. AllMusic described it as "a song made more exciting by hooky Kanye-esque samples and the unexpected beat switch that introduces a solid feature from Nardo Wick." In a review of It's Only Me, Brandon Yu of Variety cited the song as an example of when Lil Baby "lets his flow loose", which he described as his "greatest strength", while also writing "the abrupt beat-switch to a menacing sound, both in production and in Nardo Wick's strong feature, injecting a sharp energy that's absent from most of the record." Niall Smith of NME considered the song as part of the "weighty momentum" of the album.

== Music video ==
The official music video was released on November 23, 2022. It sees Lil Baby being chauffeured around in a Maybach, sitting with his two sons, "handling business" at a computer, and hanging with his crew of friends. He is later joined by Nardo Wick on the hood of an SUV.

== Charts ==
Chart performance for "Pop Out"
| Chart (2022) | Peak position |
|---|---|
| Canada Hot 100 (Billboard) | 50 |
| Global 200 (Billboard) | 28 |
| New Zealand Hot Singles (RMNZ) | 20 |
| South Africa Streaming (TOSAC) | 34 |
| US Billboard Hot 100 | 15 |
| US Hot R&B/Hip-Hop Songs (Billboard) | 6 |

== Certifications ==
Certifications for "Pop Out"
| Region | Certification | Certified units/sales |
|---|---|---|
| United States (RIAA) | Gold | 500,000^{‡} |
^{‡} Sales+streaming figures based on certification alone.
