= California Breeze =

2022 song by Lil Baby

Song by Lil Baby

from the album It's Only Me
- Released: October 14, 2022
- Genre: Hip hop
- Length: 2:57
- Label: Quality Control; Motown
- Songwriters: Dominique Jones; Shane Lindstrom; Marcel Korkutata; Cecile Karshø
- Producers: Murda Beatz; MARS

Music video
- "California Breeze" on YouTube

"California Breeze" is a song by American rapper Lil Baby, released from his third studio album It's Only Me with an accompanying music video on October 14, 2022. It was produced by Murda Beatz and MARS.

The song peaked at number four on the Billboard Hot 100, becoming the highest-charting song on the album.

== Composition ==
"California Breeze" is a "moody and melodic" song that is built around a sample of "Gwen" by Coco O. Lyrically, Lil Baby centers on his success and luxurious lifestyle, as well as "mistrusting some, protecting others and keeping his bookings up".

== Critical reception ==
The song received generally positive reviews. Shanté Collier-McDermott of Clash wrote of the song, "He floats on the beat, the second verse especially heartfelt." Carl Lamarre and Christine Werthman of Billboard considered it a "standout" from It's Only Me and praised the sampling on the track.

== Music video ==
The official music video was directed by Ivan Berrios and sees Lil Baby enjoying a cruise in a yacht on a sunny day.

== Charts ==
=== Weekly charts ===
Weekly chart performance for "California Breeze"
Chart (2022)	Peak position
Canada Hot 100 (Billboard)	27
Global 200 (Billboard)	15
New Zealand Hot Singles (RMNZ)	9
South Africa Streaming (TOSAC)	16
UK Singles (OCC)	26
US Billboard Hot 100	4
US Hot R&B/Hip-Hop Songs (Billboard)	2

=== Year-end charts ===
Year-end chart performance for "California Breeze"
Chart (2023)	Position
US Hot R&B/Hip-Hop Songs (Billboard)	61

== Certifications ==
Certifications for "California Breeze"
Region	Certification	Certified units/sales
United Kingdom (BPI)	Silver	200,000^{‡}
United States (RIAA)	Platinum	1,000,000^{‡}
^{‡} Sales+streaming figures based on certification alone.
