= 2023 UK Music Video Awards =

- Date: 26 October 2023
- Location: Magazine London, London
- Hosted by: Ana Matronic
- Most wins: METTE (4)
- Most nominations: METTE (6)
- Website: www.ukmva.com

The 2023 UK Music Video Awards were held on 26 October 2023, at Magazine London in London, to recognise the best in music videos and music film making from United Kingdom and worldwide. The ceremony was hosted by American singer and former Scissor Sisters frontwoman Ana Matronic.

The nominations were announced on 27 September 2022, with British singer Harry Styles and American singer METTE leading the nominations with six each, followed by British rapper Little Simz with five. The categories for Best Wardrobe Styling in a Video and Best Hair & Make-up in a Video were merged into Best Styling in a Video, lowering the number of technical & craft categories from ten to nine.

American singer METTE received the award for Video of the Year for "MAMA'S EYES", directed by Camille Summers-Valli. METTE also received the most awards with four. Music video directors dom&nic (Nic Goffey and Dominic Hawley) received the Icon Award for their achievements in music video directing.

== Video of the Year ==
Video of the Year
- METTE - "MAMA'S EYES"
  (Director: Camille Summers-Valli)

== Video Genre Categories ==
Best Pop Video – UK	Best Pop Video – International
Harry Styles – "Music for a Sushi Restaurant" (Director: Aube Perrie); Raye featuring 070 Shake – "Escapism" (Director: Otis Dominique); Lewis Capaldi – "Forget Me" (Director: Louis Bhose); Sam Smith – "I'm Not Here to Make Friends" (Director: Tanu Muino); Labrinth – "Kill for Your Love" (Director: Eva Laffitte); Harry Styles – "Satellite" (Director: Aube Perrie)	METTE – "MAMA'S EYES" (Director: Camille Summers-Valli); Priya Ragu – "Adalam Va" (Director: Sasha Nathwani); Christina Aguilera – "Beautiful" (2022 Version) (Director: Fiona Jane Burgess); Tove Lo – "Borderline" (Director: Nogari); Jungkook featuring Latto – "Seven" (Director: Bradley & Pablo); METTE – "VAN GOGH" (Director: Camille Summers-Valli)
Best R&B/Soul Video – UK	Best R&B/Soul Video – International
Jorja Smith – "Try Me" (Director: Amber Grace Johnson); Joesef – "Just Come Come with Me Tonight" (Director: Luis Hindman); Ezra Collective featuring Kojey Radical – "No Confusion" (Director: Douglas Bernardt); Grace Carter – "Pick Your Tears Up" (Director: Iggy London); Ama Lou – "Silence" (Directors: Mahalia John, Ama Lou, Jackie Lee); Stormzy featuring Raye – "The Weekend" (Director: Omar Jones)	Lil Yachty – "Say Something" (Director: Crowns and Owls); Kelela – "Enough for Love" (Director: Yasser Abubeker); Steve Lacy – "Helmet" (Director: Aus Taylor); SZA – "Kill Bill" (Director: Christian Breslauer); Dominique Fils-Aimé – "My Mind at Ease" (Director: Adrian Villagomez); Amaru – "Not Different" (Director: Original Kids)
Best Dance/Electronic Video – UK	Best Dance/Electronic Video – International
James Blake – "Big Hammer" (Director: Oscar Hudson); Jungle – "Back on 74" (Directors: Charlie Di Placido & J.Lloyd); Rudimental, Charlotte Plank & Vibe Chemistry – "Dancing is Healing" (Director: Eugen Merher); London Grammar featuring CamelPhat – "Higher" (Director: Waxxwork); The Chemical Brothers featuring Halo Maud – "Live Again" (Director: dom&nic); Riton featuring Soaky Siren – "Sugar" (Director: So Me)	Troye Sivan – "Rush" (Director: Gordon von Steiner); Macgray – "Backbone" (Director: Aline Magrez); The Blaze – "Madly – The Poem" (Director: The Blaze); Paul Kalkbrenner – "Schwer" (Director: Jovan B Todorović); Salvatore Ganacci – "Sexy Narkoman / Your Mother" (Directors: Salvatore Ganacci, Mistre Tesfaye, Joel Nkímyá); Thom Draft – "Tense" (Director: Albert Albert)
Best Rock Video – UK	Best Rock Video – International
Squid – "The Blades" (Director: Kasper Häggström); Shame – "Fingers of Steel" (Director: Ja Humby); Bring Me the Horizon – "LosT" (Director: Jensen Noen); Elephant Kind – "Love As" (Director: Rich Hall); Royal Blood – "Pull Me Through" (Director: Polocho); Squid – "Swing (In a Dream)" (Director: Yoonha Park)	The Hives – "Bogus Operandi" (Director: Aube Perrie); Grian Chatten – "All of the People" (Director: Sam Taylor); Stolen Nova – "Glue" (Director: Nadia Lee Cohen); Cari Cari – "My Grandma Says We Have No Future" (Director: Rupert Höller); Paramore – "Running Out of Time" (Director: Ivanna Borin); Falling in Reverse – "Watch the World Burn" (Director: Jensen Noen)
Best Alternative Video – UK	Best Alternative Video – International
Bakar – "Alive!" (Director: rubberband.); Hak Baker – "Doolally" (Director: Hugh Mulhern); Tiberius B – "HHB" (Director: Aidan Zamiri); Young Fathers – "I Saw" (Director: David Uzochukwu); L.A. Priest – "It's You" (Director: Eoin Glaister); Kokoroko – "Rapt" (Director: Akinola Davies Jr.)	Son Lux – "Undertow" (Director: Alex Cook); 070 Shake – "Black Dress" (Director: Noah Lee); Paris Texas – "Bulletman" (Director: Aus Taylor); Yves Tumor – "Echolalia" (Director: Jordan Hemingway); Tshegue – "Mais" (Director: Ibrahim Kamara); Dominic Fike – "Mama's Boy" (Director: rubberband.)
Best Hip Hop/Grime/Rap Video – UK	Best Hip Hop/Grime/Rap Video – International
AntsLive – "Number One Candidate" (Director: Tom Emmerson); Little Simz – "Gorilla" (Director: Dave Meyers); J Hus – "It's Crazy" (Director: Taz Tron Delix); Stormzy – "Mel Made Me Do It" (Director: KLVDR); Jords – "Mobay / Stay Close" (Director: Renee Osobu); Loyle Carner – "Nobody Knows (Ladas Road)" (Director: UNCANNY)	Benjamin Earl Turner – "Headspace" (Director: Abteen Bagheri); Doja Cat – "Attention" (Director: Tanu Muino); Kendrick Lamar – "Count Me Out" (Directors: Dave Free and Kendrick Lamar); Audrey Nuna – "Locket" (Director: Valentin Petit); Travis Scott – "Sirens" (Director: Travis Scott); Biki – "Zigidi" (Director: Maceo Frost)
Best Pop Video – Newcomer	Best R&B/Soul Video – Newcomer
Ariete – "Mare di Guai" (Director: Enea Colombi); Kamal – "Freeflow" (Director: Tyrus); Beabadoobee – "Glue Song" (Director: Jacob Erland); Virgin Miri – "Kill Me" (Directors: Virgin Miri and Andreas Öhman); Sila Lua – "Rompe" (Director: Nysu); Grentperez – "Us Without Me" (Director: Devon Kuziw)	Sans Soucis – "I Know Your Present" (Director: Jay Green); George – "Forever" (Director: Tanaseth Tulyathan); Aaron Taylor – "Have a Nice Day" (Director: Devon Kuziw); Hendrix Harris – "It's Not You" (Director: Lauren Luxenberg); Léa Sen – "Luv Him" (Director: Constantine/Spence); Konyikeh – "Teenage Dreams" (Director: Korrie Powell)
Best Dance/Electronic Video – Newcomer	Best Rock Video – Newcomer
Mura Masa – "Whenever I Want" (Director: The Reids); DJ Seinfeld featuring Confidence Man – "Now U Do" (Director: India Rose Harris); Everyone You Know – "Paper Aeroplanes" (Director: Jay Green); Riton featuring Soaky Siren – "Sugar" (Director: Phillip Watson); Ghost Gun – "Venom" (Director: Alfredo Vidal); Fakear – "Voyager" (Director: ffi0oul)	Stone – "Left Right Forward" (Director: Abigail Wilson); Heartworms – "24 Hours" (Director: Gilbert Trejo); Aliment – "Com Espines" (Director: Albert Sala); Stone – "I Gotta Feeling" (Director: Maxi McLachlan); L Devine – "Push It Down" (Director: Emilio Gamal Boutros); The Academic – "Pushing Up Daisies" (Director: Tearjerker)
Best Alternative Video – Newcomer	Best Hip Hop/Grime/Rap Video – Newcomer
Hak Baker – "Telephones 4 Eyes" (Director: Hugh Mulhern); Anna B Savage – "in|FLUX" (Director: Rosie Barrett); Patrick Wolf – "Nowhere Game" (Director: Joseph Wilson); Entely – "Prosa" (Director: Kyryl Volovych); Tsunaina – "Tenderer" (Directors: Tsunaina, Justin Ridler, Jake Jelicich); dné – "Traps in My Feed" (Director: Lubos Vacke)	Kibo – "Mr Lamborghini Deathslide" (Director: Lauzza); Ayrtn – "2 Da Max" (Director: Tyrus); Kam-Bu – "Eton Mess" (Director: Jay Green); Louis Culture – "Grime" (Director: Tyrus); Big Health – "Let's Go" (Director: Henry Oliver); Depzman – "Life Cut Short" (Director: brightnight)

== Technical and Craft Categories ==
Best Performance in a Video	Best Production Design in a Video
Truman – "Charley Boy" (Performer: Truman); Bakar – "Alive!" (Performer: Bakar); Little Simz – "Gorilla" (Performer: Little Simz); The Blaze – "Madly – The Poem" (Performer: Riley Jacobs); METTE – "MAMA'S EYES" (Performer: METTE); AntsLive – "Number One Candidate" (Performer: AntsLive)	Fatoumata Diawara featuring Damon Albarn – "Nsera" (Production Designer: Anaïs Profit); Yves Tumor – "Echolalia" (Production Designer: Studio Augmenta); Romeo Santos and Rosalía – "El Pañuelo" (Production Designer: Laia Ateca); Little Simz – "Gorilla" (Production Designer: Nucalifornia); Jords – "Mobay / Stay Close" (Production Designer: Elena Muntoni); Harry Styles – "Music for a Sushi Restaurant" (Production Designer: Patience Harding)
Best Styling in a Video	Best Choreography in a Video
Fatoumata Diawara featuring Damon Albarn – "Nsera" (Stylist: Dabby Naval); Yves Tumor – "Echolalia" (Stylists: Nick Royal, Peri Rosenzweig, Anete Salinieka, Ryo Narushima); Audrey Nuna – "Locket" (Stylist: Florie Vitse); The Blaze – "Madly – The Poem" (Stylist: Maud Dupuy); Jords – "Mobay / Stay Close" (Stylist: Jodie-Simone Howe); Troye Sivan – "Rush" (Stylist: Larissa Bechtold)	Jungle – "Back on 74" (Choreographer: Shay Latukolan); Channel Tres – "6AM" (Choreographer: Craig Fishback); The 1975 – "I'm in Love with You" (Choreographer: Katie Collins); METTE – "MAMA'S EYES" (Choreographer: Calvit Hodge); Dominique Fils-Aimé – "My Mind at Ease" (Choreographer: Mel Carlot); METTE – "VAN GOGH" (Choreographer: Calvit Hodge)
Best Cinematography in a Video	Best Colour Grading in a Video
The Blaze – "Madly – The Poem" (Cinematographer: Nicolas Loir); The Hives – "Bogus Operandi" (Cinematographer: Joel Hördegård); Little Simz – "Gorilla" (Cinematographer: Scott Cunningham); Josman – "Intro" (Cinematographer: Julien Ramirez-Hernan); Harry Styles – "Music for a Sushi Restaurant" (Cinematographer: Christopher Ripley); AntsLive – "Number One Candidate" (Cinematographer: Isaac Eastgate)	Katie Melua – "Love and Money" (Colourist: Felipe Szulc at Nomad); Rudimental, Charlotte Plank & Vibe Chemistry – "Dancing is Healing" (Colourist: Jason Wallis at Electric Theatre Collective); Stolen Nova – "Glue" (Colourist: Ricky Gausis at Trafik); Hendrix Harris – "It's Not You" (Colourist: Kate Dymmock at Coffee & TV); Harry Styles – "Music for a Sushi Restaurant" (Colourist: Tom Mangham at Black Kite Studios); Royal Blood – "Pull Me Through" (Colourist: Megan Lee at Electric Theatre Collective)
Best Editing in a Video	Best Visual Effects in a Video
METTE – "MAMA'S EYES" (Editor: Vid Price at Trim Editing); Doja Cat – "Attention" (Editor: Carlos Font at Stitch); James Blake – "Big Hammer" (Editor: Fouad Gaber at Trim Editing); The Hives – "Bogus Operandi" (Editor: Gwen Ghelid); Audrey Nuna – "Locket" (Editors: Valentin Petit & Simon Tristant at Monumental FX); Harry Styles – "Music for a Sushi Restaurant" (Editor: Gwen Ghelid & Aube Perrie)	Audrey Nuna – "Locket" (VFX Artist: Square); Skiifall – "2 Charming" (VFX Artist: Square); Hak Baker – "Telephones 4 Eyes" (VFX Artists: Dom Harwood, @infinite_vibes, @cmkrealm); Labrinth – "Kill for Your Love" (VFX Artist: sauvage.tv); The Chemical Brothers featuring Halo Maud – "Live Again" (VFX Artist: Untold Studios); Stormzy featuring Fredo – "Toxic Trait" (VFX Artists: Luke Todd, Nick John, Callum Wellby, Alfie Vaughan, James Belch & Lewis Crossfield at Coffee & TV)
Best Animation in a Video
Daft Punk – "Infinity Repeating (2013 Demo)" (Animators: Robert Faux, Liam O'Connor, Warren Fu, Thành Tran, Deco Daviola, Thomás Kiyoshi, Swan Lenczne, Lino Grandi, Cyrielle Gulacsy, Angelo Caramanica, Luca Giarrettino, Dan Vislocky, Raphaël Bot-Gartner & Aurélien Roncerai); Hot Chip – "Eleanor" (Animators: Rita Sampaio, Shirel Lebovich, Mike Kelly, Fred Stanton at b.art studio); des hume featuring (juicelover) – "onetwostep" (Animator: Jordan Clarke); Gorillaz – "Silent Running" (Animators: William Lorton, Marylou Mao, Tom Lowe & Beth Levy at Nexus Studios); Ashnikko – "Worms" (Animators: Dominic Lutz, Harry Bharelao, Barley Abrahams, Ate Die, Sandrine Gimenez, Klaas Harm Deboer, Michael Marczewski, Balazs Simon, John Malcom Moore, Andrew Khosravani, Vladislav Enshin, Aroline Terrago & Raman Djafari); Muse – "You Make Me Feel Like It's Halloween" (Animators: Steven Lee, Stephanie Buschhorn, Cristina Kuong, Paolo Cogliati, Matheus Caetano, Talles Fernando, Alvaro Moreira & Enrique de la Garza at Frame 48)

== Special Video Categories ==
Best Live Video	Best Special Video Project
Young Fathers – "I Saw", "Rice", "Geronimo" (Director: Tom Hingston); Jeshi – "Bad Day at the Office" (Live Film) (Director: Ethan & Tom); The 1975 – Being Funny in a Foreign Language (Vevo Official Live Performance) (Director: Jim Wilmot); Gerry Cinnamon – "Canter" (Live at Hampden Park) (Directors: George Thomson, Gerry Cinnamon, Harrison Smith); BERWYN – "Path to Satisfaction" (Live at Niceness) (Director: Theo Hue Williams); The Last Dinner Party – Sinner (Director: Balan Evans)	Kendrick Lamar – "We Cry Together" (Directors: Jake Schreier, Dave Free, Kendrick Lamar); 802 – A Heavy Metal Bedtime Story (Director: Casper Balslev); Gorillaz – Gorillaz Presents... Skinny Ape (Directors: Jamie Hewlett & FX Goby); Little Simz – NO THANK YOU (Director: Gabriel Moses); TSHA – Sister (Director: Alice Bloomfield); Jungle – Volcano (Directors: Charlie Di Placido & J.Lloyd)

== Individual and Company Categories ==
Best Director	Best New Director
Aube Perrie; Camille Summers-Valli; Charlie di Placido; rubberband.; Tanu Muino; The Blaze	Hugh Mulhern; Aboveground; Aidan Zamiri; Kassandra Powell; Tom Emmerson; UNCANNY
Best Director of Photography	Best Producer
Nikita Kuzmenko; Adam Newport-Berra; Henry Gill; Jake Gabbay; Natasha Duursma; Spike Morris	Rik Green; Danny Herman; Elizabeth Doonan; Fred Bonham Carter; Maeva Tenneroni; Theo Hue Williams
Best Production Company	Best Commissioner
Pulse Films; CANADA; Friend London; Iconoclast; Object & Animal; Smuggler	Kat Cattaneo; Erin Corrian-Alexis; Faye Purcell; John Moule; Kim Jarrett; Michael Lewin
Best Agent	Icon Award
Alexa Haywood, Freeagent; André Reid-McKinley, Somesuch; Claire Stubbs & Connie Meade, Mouthpiece; Lee Fairweather, Leethal Reppin; Sam Davey & Polly Millner, OB42; Sarah Boardman, Joceline Gabriel & Camille Semprez, Hands	dom&nic
