= 2024 UK Music Video Awards =

- Date: 24 October 2024
- Location: Magazine London, London
- Hosted by: Ana Matronic
- Most wins: AntsLive (3)
- Most nominations: Charli XCX (7)
- Website: www.ukmva.com

The 2024 UK Music Video Awards were held on 24 October 2024, in London, which recognises the best in music videos and music film making from United Kingdom and worldwide delivered between August 2023 and July 2024. Submissions were open from June 2024 to 1 August 2024. The ceremony was hosted by American singer and former Scissor Sisters frontwoman Ana Matronic for a second year in a row.

The nominations were announced on 25 September 2024. In terms of categories, the newcomer video categories were reduced from six to four grouping some, while the technical categories for Best Cinematography, Best Colour Grading and Best Editing were split into two each, for newcomer and non-newcomer videos. British singer Charli XCX led the nominations with seven, followed by American singer-rapper Childish Gambino with six, while British singer JADE and Irish band Fontaines D.C. received five each.

Charli XCX's "360", directed by Aidan Zamiri, won Video of the Year. British rapper AntsLive was the most awarded artist of the ceremony with three awards, followed by Charli XCX, The Chemical Brothers, Fontaines D.C. and RM, all with two awards each. Canadian director Floria Sigismondi was honoured with the Icon Award for her "outstanding achievement in music videos for over the past three decades", presented by Lawrence Rothman.

== Video of the Year ==
Video of the Year
- Charli XCX – "360"
  (Director: Aidan Zamiri)

== Video Genre Categories ==
Best Pop Video – UK	Best Pop Video – International
Charli XCX – "360" (Director: Aidan Zamiri); JADE – "Angel of My Dreams" (Director: Aube Perrie); Coldplay – "feelslikeimfallinginlove" (Director: Raman Djafari); RAYE – "Genesis" (Directors: Otis Dominique & Raye); Dua Lipa – "Illusion" (Director: Tanu Muino); Charli XCX – "Von Dutch" (Director: Torso)	Mette – "Bet" (Director: C Prinz); V – "Fri(end)s" (Director: Samuel Bradley); Camila Cabello featuring Playboi Carti – "I Luv It" (Director: Nicolás Méndez); Miki Matsubara – "Mayonaka no Door (Stay with Me)" (Directors: Fridman Sisters); Olivia Rodrigo – "obsessed" (Director: Mitch Ryan); Lisa – "Rockstar" (Director: Henry Scholfield)
Best R&B/Soul Video – UK	Best R&B/Soul Video – International
Ezra Collective featuring Yazmin Lacey – "God Gave Me Feet for Dancing" (Director: Tajana Tokyo); Sampha – "Can't Go Back" (Director: Saad Moosajee); Mabel featuring Shygirl – "Look At My Body Pt. II" (Director: David Wilson); Leigh-Anne – "My Love" (Director: Meji Alabi); Anaiis – "Openhearted" (Director: Jenny Brough); Olivia Dean – "Time" (Director: Jake Erland)	Kamasi Washington featuring George Clinton & D Smoke – "Get Lit" (Director: Jenn Nkiru); Ravyn Lenae featuring Childish Gambino – "One Wish" (Director: Andre Muir); Kamasi Washington – "Prologue" (Director: AG Rojas); Omar Apollo – "Spite" (Director: David Heofs); Jeremy Pope – "U Lost + What I Gotta Do" (Director: C Prinz); Moses Sumney – "Vintage" (Director: Moses Sumney)
Best Dance/Electronic Video – UK	Best Dance/Electronic Video – International
The Chemical Brothers featuring Beck – "Skipping Like a Stone" (Director: Pensacola); Charli XCX featuring Billie Eilish – "Guess" (Director: Aidan Zamiri); James Blake – "Playing Robots Into Heaven" (Director: Thibault Grevet); Supermodel – "Push" (Directors: Emile Rafael & Joe Connor); Fred again.. & Lil Yachty & Overmono – "stayinit" (Directors: Uncanny & Loose); James Blake – "Thrown Around" (Director: The Reids)	Justice – "Generator" (Director: Léa Ceheivi); Salvatore Ganacci & Tommy Cash – "Ass & Titties" (Directors: Mistre Tesfaye & Joel Nkímyá); Yseult – "Bitch You Could Never" (Director: Shadrinsky); Innellea x Flowdan – "Forward Forever" (Director: Marco Fumolo); Confidence Man – "I Can't Lose You" (Director: Zac Dov Wiesel); Apashe – "Revenge of the Orchestra" (Director: Adrian Villagomez)
Best Rock Video – UK	Best Rock Video – International
IDLES – "Gift Horse" (Director: David Helman); The Rolling Stones – "Angry" (Director: François Rousselet); IDLES – "Dancer" (Director: Jocelyn Anquetil); Stone – "Queen" (Director: Grajper); Fat Dog – "Running" (Director: Stephen Agnew); Fat White Family – "Work" (Director: CC Wade)	Fontaines D.C. – "Starburster" (Director: Aube Perrie); Fontaines D.C. – "Here's the Thing" (Director: Luna Carmoon); Childish Gambino – "Lithonia" (Director: Jack Begert); Zach Bryan – "Nine Ball" (Director: Matthew Dillon Cohen); Falling in Reverse featuring Tech N9ne – "Ronald" (Director: Jensen Noen); Rage Against the Machine – "Sleep Now in the Fire" (Director: Todd Tourso)
Best Alternative Video – UK	Best Alternative Video – International
Depeche Mode – "People Are Good" (Director: Rich Hall); The Irrepressibles – "Be Wild" (Director: Joseph Wilson); Skinny Pelembe – "Don't Be Another" (Director: Jai Moseley); The Smile – "Wall of Eyes" (Director: Paul Thomas Anderson); Metronomy x Naima Bock x Joshua Idehen – "With Balance" (Director: Lucas Reis); Joe Armon-Jones & Hak Baker – "Wrong Side of Town" (Director: Broken Antenna)	RM – "LOST!" (Director: Aube Perrie); Hyukoh & Sunset Rollercoaster – "Antenna" (Director: Rafhoo); Nick Leng – "Beetlebugs" (Director: Josh Sondock); Judeline – "Inri" (Director: Nono + Rodrigo); Mitski – "My Love Mine All Mine" (Director: AG Rojas); Jerry Paper – "Scenic Route" (Director: Dan Streit)
Best Hip Hop/Grime/Rap Video – UK	Best Hip Hop/Grime/Rap Video – International
AntsLive – "Captain Ants" (Director: Tom Emmerson); J Hus – "Cream" (Director: Nicholas Lam); Jeshi featuring Fredwave, Louis Culture & J Caesar – "Disconnect!" (Director: Blackwall); Unknown T featuring Loyle Carner – "Hocus Pocus" (Director: Felix Brady); Meekz – "Mini Me's" (Director: KC Locke); Bashy – "Sweet Boys Turned Sour" (Director: George Power)	Free Nationals, A$AP Rocky & Anderson .Paak – "Gangsta" (Director: François Rousselet); Mula B – "Blokke Gepikt" (Director: Folkert Verdoorn); Megan Thee Stallion – "Cobra" (Director: Douglas Bernardt); Doja Cat – "Demons" (Director: christian Breslauer); Travis Scott featuring Playboi Carti – "FE!N" (Director: Gabriel Moses); Childish Gambino – "Little Foot Big Foot" (Director: Hiro Murai)
Best Pop / R&B / Soul Video – Newcomer	Best Dance / Electronic Video – Newcomer
Matilda Mann – "Meet Cute" (Director: Ben Harris); Rio Rainz – "BAD" (Directors: Nathan Ivor-Barlow & Marcus Prowse); Konyikeh – "Lie to Me" (Director: Billy King); Hillari – "New Beginnings" (Director: David Vu); Moonchild Sanelly – "Scrambled Eggs" (Director: Jabu Nadia Newman); Joalin – "Without You" (Director: Deadhorses)	Realo – "Money Up Pants Down" (Director: Alex Acy); FEUX – "Angel" (Director: Owen Kasparian); Siriusmo featuring Mr Oizo – "Doppelklick" (Director: Niels P Rost); Mura Masa – "Rise" (Director: The Reids); Elisa Delage – "Shikaponk" (Director: Martin Malnoe); Lydsten – "Bias" (Director: Simon Lmarchand)
Best Rock / Alternative Video – Newcomer	Best Hip Hop / Grime / Rap Video – Newcomer
Elbow – "Lovers' Leap" (Director: Baby); Oracle Sisters – "Alouette" (Director: Jim Longden); Sam Akpro – "Death by Entertainment" (Director: Pedro Takahashi); Honeyglaze – "Don't" (Director: James Ogram); Humane the Moon featuring Jeshi – "K9" (Director: Rawtape); DEADLETTER – "Mere Mortal" (Director: Laurence Hills)	AntsLive – "Cutlery" (Director: Billy King); Audrey Nuna – "Cellulite" (Director: Zac Dov Wiesel); John Glacier – "Cows Come Home" (Director: Yasser Abubeker); Yvnnis – "Gare du Nord" (Director: Ferina); ONHA – "Kodak" (Director: Nitram); Wallace Cleaver – "Plus rien n'est grave" (Director: Sangfroid)

== Technical and Craft Categories ==
Best Performance in a Video	Best Production Design in a Video
AntsLive – "Captain Ants" (Performer: AntsLive); JADE – "Angel of My Dreams" (Performer: JADE); Mette – "Bet" (Performer: Mette); Free Nationals, A$AP Rocky & Anderson .Paak – "Gangsta" (Performers: Kieren October & Adam Brain); RAYE – "Genesis" (Performer: Raye); Childish Gambino – "Little Foot Big Foot" (Performers: Childish Gambino & Young Nudy)	RM – "LOST!" (Production Designer: Studio Augmenta); Yseult – "Bitch You Could Never" (Production Designer: Prudence Palle); Porter Robinson – "Cheerleader" (Production Designer: Elena Isolini); Olly Alexander – "Dizzy" (Production Designer: George Karalashvili); Free Nationals, A$AP Rocky & Anderson .Paak – "Gangsta" (Production Designer: Riccardo Pugliese); Charli XCX featuring Billie Eilish – "Guess" (Production Designer: Hugh Zeigler)
Best Styling in a Video	Best Choreography in a Video
Fontaines D.C. – "Here's the Thing" (Stylist: Lucy James); Charli XCX – "360" (Stylists: Chris Horan, Isamaya Ffrench & Kachay "Cache" Dorsey); JADE – "Angel of My Dreams" (Stylists: Zack Tate, Jamie McFarland & Ellie Walker); Free Nationals, A$AP Rocky & Anderson .Paak – "Gangsta" (Stylist: Dihantus Engelbrecht); Fontaines D.C. – "Starburster" (Stylist: Ellie Walker); Crystal Murray – "Starmaniak" (Stylist: Stephy Galvani)	Jeremy Pope – "U Lost + What I Gotta Do" (Choreographer: Parris Goebel); Mette – "Bet" (Choreographer: Tyrik J Patterson); Soprano – "Facile À Danser" (Choreographer: Ikenna David); Ezra Collective featuring Yazmin Lacey – "God Gave Me Feet for Dancing" (Choreographers: Kikz Katika & Michele Zan); Childish Gambino – "Little Foot Big Foot" (Choreographer: Shay Latoukolan); Molchat Doma – "Ty Zhe Ne Znaesh Kto Ya" (Choreographer: Arran Green)
Best Cinematography in a Video	Best Cinematography in a Video – Newcomer
Lil Dicky – "HAHAHA" (Cinematographer: Benjamin Loeb); Justice – "Generator" (Cinematographer: Benoît Soler); RAYE – "Genesis" (Cinematographer: David Wright); Fontaines D.C. – "Here's the Thing" (Cinematographer: Antoine Cormier); Alaskan Tapes – "Of Woods and Seas" (Cinematographer: Oliver Millar); James Blake – "Playing Robots Into Heaven" (Cinematographer: João de Botelho)	Wallace Cleaver – "Plus rien n'est grave" (Cinematographer: Angelo Marques); James Massiah – "Charlie" (Cinematographer: Natasha Duursma); Chameleon – "I Never Knew You Well" (Cinematographer: Ignas Laugalis); Konyikeh – "Lie to Me" (Cinematographer: Riu Jiang Ong); Stone – "Queen" (Cinematographer: Louis Evennou); ĠENN – "The Sister Of" (Cinematographer: Borya Borysov)
Best Colour Grading in a Video	Best Colour Grading in a Video – Newcomer
Alaskan Tapes – "Of Woods and Seas" (Colourist: Sam Gilling at Outsider Editorial); Charli XCX – "360" (Colourist: Myles Bevan at Studio RM); Pink – "All Out of Fight" (Colourist: Megan Lee at Electric Theatre Collective); AntsLive – "Captain Ants" (Colourist: Tim Smith at No. 8); Friedberg – "My Best Friend" (Colourist: Christopher Hanisch); Cassie Marin – "Tanto" (Colourist: Daniel de Vue at Trafik)	Say Lou Lou – "Dust" (Colourist: Alex O'Brien at Okay Studio); Nick Wilson – "For You It Was Him" (Colourist: Sophie Sugrue at Harbor Picture Company); Konyikeh – "Lie to Me" (Colourist: Vanessa Aparicio at Glassworks); Downtown Kayoto – "My Best" (Colourist: Nielsan Bohl at Selected Works); Wallace Cleaver – "Plus rien n'est grave" (Colourist: Eudes Quittelier at Monumental FX); Nia Archives – "Unfinished Business" (Colourist: Mara Ciorba at Harbor Picture Company)
Best Editing in a Video	Best Editing in a Video – Newcomer
JADE – "Angel of My Dreams" (Editor: Gwen Ghelid); Hyukoh & Sunset Rollercoaster – "Antenna" (Editor: Rafhoo); Jeshi featuring Fredwave, Louis Culture & J Caesar – "Disconnect!" (Editor: Steve Shaw); Camila Cabello featuring Playboi Carti – "I Luv It" (Editor: Aitor Bigas); Charli XCX – "Von Dutch" (Editor: William Town); Joe Armon-Jones & Hak Baker – "Wrong Side of Town" (Editor: Myles McAuliffe)	Yvnnis – "Gare du Nord" (Editor: Ferina); John Glacier – "Cows Come Home" (Editor: Ben Cowan); ONHA – "Kodak" (Editor: M Tikal); 21 Savage – "Redrum" (Editor: Anders Mills); Mura Masa – "Rise" (Editor: The Reids & Mura Masa); KiLLOWEN x Tommy Villiers – "Top Bins" (Editor: Jets)
Best Visual Effects in a Video	Best Animation in a Video
The Chemical Brothers featuring Beck – "Skipping Like a Stone" (VFX Artists: Pensacola); The Rolling Stones – "Angry" (VFX Artists: Jonny Freeman & George Brunt); Mette – "Bet" (VFX Artists: Matt Fuller, Brad Wood, Heather Costa, Guy Tourgeman, Alex Morote & Frank Engen); Justice – "Generator" (VFX Artists: Mathematic; VFX Executive Producer: Guillaume Marien; VFX Supervisor: Jéhan Bouazza; VFX Producer: Gouna Logan; VFX Coordinator: Camille Lorthioy; VFX Team: Naathan Vidal, Guillaume Boudeville, Jules Giraud, Adrien Delecroix, Eva Clerc, Andrea Hervet, Miki Stojanovski, Aleksandar Trajkovski, Maksym Gioda, Charline Parisot, Julie Cervantes, Frederic Boulin, Morgane Scionico, Martin Teillet, Anais Sassatelli, Stanislas Gruenais, Djelloul Bekri, Selim Meddeb, Benjamin Mack, Julien Michel, Tiago Barbosa, Olivier Tournayre, Laurent Launes, Samuel Roux & Frederic Brandon); RM – "LOST!" (VFX Artists: Pineapple VFX); Cassie Marin – "Tanto" (VFX Artists: Alex Snookes, Zak Dimaria, Ryland Bowen-Johnson, Pat Muños, Steven Nelson, Jaguar Lee, Elyse Resseguie, Yu Fujii, Sarah Banks, Eric Epstein, Andrey Nikolaev & Scott Stirling)	Coldplay – "feelslikeimfallinginlove" (Animators: Tokay, Dante Zaballa, Martin Robic, Kinemus, Jack Zhang, Niki Lindroth von Bahr, moera.cf, Gaia Esther Martia, Aaron Fisher, Karlotta Freier, Raman Djafari, Isabel Garrett, Hannah van der Weide, Kohana Wilson & Ram Han); L'Impératrice – "Danza Marilù" (Animators: Vincent Albert, Armand Goxe, Gabrielle Selnet, Arthur Sevestre & May Taraud); Elsa y Elmar – "entre las piernas" (Animators: Eyco, Krishna Kothari, Pari Tawale, Emalie Tison, Matteo Yermia, Louai Ben Adda, Sali Samadbegishvili, Jan Henrik Hansen, Pola Lucas, Dani Bassi & Rodrigo Yao; FX Animators: Guillaume Degroot & Avto Gvaramia; Character Layout & Posing: Jeremy Lelorrain); HONNE – "Girl in the Orchestra" (Animator: Jenny Jokela); Sad Night Dynamite – "Wake Up, Pass Out" (Animators: Balázs Simon & Dávid Dell'edera); Danny Brown – "Y.B.P." (Animator: William Child)

== Special Video Categories ==
Best Live Video	Best Special Video Project
Fred again.. x Anderson .Paak featuring Chika – "Places to Be" (Director: Loose); JADE – "Angel of My Dreams" (s.a.d. – slow. angelic. dramatic – live version) (Directors: Theo Adams & Sophie Muller); Omar Apollo – "Dispose of Me" (Director: David Heofs); Yard Act – Live from Utopia (Director: Ja Humby); RAYE – "Oscar Winning Tears (Live at the Royal Albert Hall)" (Director: Paul Dugdale); Washed Out – Waking Up (Eclipse Live Session) (Director: Jonah Haber)	Baloji – Augure: Infinite Trolling (Director: Baloji); Childish Gambino – Bando Stone & the New World (Director: Childish Gambino); Arssalendo – Chiamere Casa Sempre Lo Stesso Posto (Director: Giada Bossi); Kamasi Washington featuring George Clinton & D Smoke – "Get Lit" (Director: Jenn Nkiru); Rage Against the Machine – "Sleep Now in the Fire" (Director: Todd Tourso); The Avalanches – "Yeah The Boys" (Director: Stefan Hunt)

== Individual and Company Categories ==
Best Director	Best New Director
Aube Perrie; Aidan Zamiri; C Prinz; François Rousselet; Tanu Muino; Tom Emmerson	The Reids; Billy King; Jake Erland; Pedro Takahashi; Sang Froid; Zac Dov Wiesel
Best Production Company	Best Producer
Object & Animal; DIVISION; Iconoclast; Pulse Films; Riff Raff Films; Stink Films	Theo Hue Williams; Chris Murdoch; Ernest Bouvier; Manoela Chiabai; Rowan Mackintosh King; Two Happy (Joseph J Goldman & Luke Tierney)
Best Creative Commissioner
Scott Wright (XL Recordings); John Moule; Kat Cattaneo (Sony Music Entertainment UK); Louis Danckwerts (Polydor); Michael Lewin (Sony Music Entertainment UK); Theresa Adebiyi (Warner Music UK)
Best Agent	Best Executive Producer
Alexa Haywood (FreeAgent UK); Alex Brinkman (Object & Animal); Andre Reid-McKinley (REPmedia); Claire Stubbs & Connie Meade (Mouthpiece); Lee Fairweather (Leethal Reppin); Sarah Boardman, Joceline Gabriel & Camille Semprez (HANDS)	Alex Brinkman (Object & Animal); Dom Thomas (Object & Animal); Dominic Mckiernan (Stink Films); Elena Argiros & Rik Green (Pulse Films); Frank Borin & Ivanna Borin (Underwonder Content); Jules de Chateleux (DIVISION)
Icon Award
Floria Sigismondi
