= UK Music Video Awards =

Musical awards

- Current: 2026 UK Music Video Awards
- Awarded for: excellence in music video and moving image for music
- Country: United Kingdom
- First award: 2008; 18 years ago
- Website: www.ukmva.com

The UK Music Video Awards is an annual celebration of creativity, technical excellence and innovation in music video and moving image for music. The awards began in 2008. There is a wide range of opportunities for UK individuals and companies to enter their work: from genre-led video categories, to prizes for individuals in the technical and craft areas of the business, to recognition for innovative approaches to music videos, ads and other visuals. There are also awards for international videos and outstanding individuals, voted for by the MVA jury members. The Awards take place in the autumn, with the entry process opening in early August. The UK MVA's are originally the key members of the team behind BUG, the BFI Southbank's music video strand, and have 20 years’ experience running events in the UK music video business.

== Ceremonies ==
| Edition | Date | Venue | Host | Video of the Year | | |
| Edition | Date | Venue | Host | Video | Musician | Director |
|---|---|---|---|---|---|---|
| 1st | 14 October 2008 | Leicester Square | Adam Buxton | "Wanderlust" | Björk | Encyclopedia Pictura |
| 2nd | 13 October 2009 | Leicester Square | Adam Buxton | "Strawberry Swing" | Coldplay | Shynola |
| 3rd | 12 October 2010 | Leicester Square | Adam Buxton | "This Too Shall Pass" | OK Go | James Frost, Synn Labs and OK Go |
| 4th | 8 November 2011 | Leicester Square | Adam Buxton | "Simple Math" | Manchester Orchestra | Dan Kwan and Daniel Scheinert |
| 5th | 8 November 2012 | Leicester Square | Adam Buxton | "Bad Girls" | M.I.A. | Romain Gavras |
| 6th | 28 October 2013 | Queen Elizabeth Hall | Adam Buxton | "Until the Quiet Comes" | Flying Lotus | Kahlil Joseph |
| 7th | 10 November 2014 | Queen Elizabeth Hall | Adam Buxton | "Turn Down for What" | DJ Snake and Lil Jon | Dan Kwan and Daniel Scheinert |
| 8th | 5 November 2015 | Roundhouse | Adam Buxton | "Alright" | Kendrick Lamar | Colin Tilley and The Little Homies |
| 9th | 20 October 2016 | Roundhouse | Adam Buxton | "Gosh" | Jamie xx | Romain Gavras |
| 10th | 26 October 2017 | Roundhouse | Adam Buxton | "Wyclef Jean" | Young Thug | Ryan Staake |
| 11th | 25 October 2018 | Roundhouse | Adam Buxton | "This Is America" | Childish Gambino | Hiro Murai |
| 12th | 23 October 2019 | Roundhouse | Adam Buxton | "Vossi Bop" | Stormzy | Henry Scholfield |
| 13th | 5 November 2020 | Virtual | Becca Dudley | "Rocket Fuel" | DJ Shadow featuring De La Soul | Sam Pilling |
| 14th | 4 November 2021 | Roundhouse | Maisie Adam | "Mesmerize" | Duck Sauce | Keith Schofield |
| 15th | 27 October 2022 | Magazine London | Spencer Jones | "Cash In Cash Out" | Pharrell Williams, 21 Savage and Tyler, the Creator | François Rousselet |
| 16th | 26 October 2023 | Magazine London | Ana Matronic | "Mama's Eyes" | METTE | Camille Summers-Valli |
| 17th | 24 October 2024 | Magazine London | Ana Matronic | "360" | Charli XCX | Aidan Zamiri |
| 18th | 30 October 2025 | Magazine London | Ana Matronic | "Tailor Swif" | A$AP Rocky | Vania Heymann & Gal Muggia |

== Categories ==
As of 2025, 38 competitive categories are awarded split in video genre (which are divided in British, international and newcomer), special video, craft and technical and individual and company categories plus the Video of the Year and special categories like the Icon Award.

=== Current categories ===
- Video of the Year

==== Video genre categories ====
- Best Pop Video – UK
- Best Pop Video – International
- Best Rock Video – UK
- Best Rock Video – International
- Best Alternative Video – UK
- Best Alternative Video – International
- Best Dance/Electronic Video – UK
- Best Dance/Electronic Video – International
- Best Hip Hop/Grime/Rap Video – UK
- Best Hip Hop/Grime/Rap Video – International
- Best R&B/Soul Video – UK
- Best R&B/Soul Video – International
- Best Pop Video – Newcomer
- Best Rock Video – Newcomer
- Best Alternative Video – Newcomer
- Best Dance/Electronic Video – Newcomer
- Best Hip Hop/Grime/Rap Video – Newcomer
- Best R&B/Soul Video – Newcomer

==== Special video categories ====
- Best Live Video
- Best Performance in a Video
- Best Special Video Project
- Best Music Film

==== Craft and technical categories ====
- Best Production Design in a Video
- Best Styling in a Video
- Best Choreography in a Video
- Best Cinematography in a Video
- Best Cinematography in a Video – Newcomer
- Best Color Grading in a Video
- Best Color Grading in a Video – Newcomer
- Best Editing in a Video
- Best Editing in a Video – Newcomer
- Best Visual Effects in a Video
- Best Animation in a Video
- Best Casting in a Video

==== Individual and company categories ====
- Best Director
- Best New Director
- Best Commissioner
- Best Producer
- Best Production Company
- Best Post-Production Company
- Best Agent
