= Riot (Rowdy Pipe'n) =

2023 single by ASAP Rocky

Single by ASAP Rocky
- Released: July 20, 2023
- Genre: Hip hop; cloud rap
- Length: 3:09
- Label: AWGE; A$AP Worldwide; RCA
- Songwriters: Rakim Mayers; Pharrell Williams; Tyler Okonma
- Producers: ASAP Rocky; Pharrell Williams; Tyler, the Creator

ASAP Rocky singles chronology
"Same Problems?" (2023)	"Riot (Rowdy Pipe'n)" (2023)	"Gangsta" (2024)

Music video
- "RIOT (Rowdy Pipe'n)" on YouTube

"Riot (Rowdy Pipe'n)" is a single by American rapper ASAP Rocky released on July 20, 2023. It was produced by Rocky himself, along with Pharrell Williams and Tyler, the Creator.

== Background ==
The song previously leaked in 2021. It originally featured Tyler, the Creator, but he was cut from the final version. ASAP Rocky performed an early version of the song on Amazon Music Live in December 2022. Certain lyrics in the song have fueled rumors that Rocky and his partner Rihanna are married.

The song was used in an advertisement for Beats Electronics, in which Rocky goes to buy diapers for his son, named Rza, at Rihanna's request. It was shot and directed by Rocky in Tokyo and released alongside the song.

== Composition and lyrics ==
The production begins with Pharrell's signature "four-beat" intro, followed by reverbed horn sounds and an array of synthesizers. In the chorus, ASAP Rocky interpolates the melody of "Smells Like Teen Spirit" by Nirvana and vows to speak out on what he believes in: "We grow, we learn and we live (Woo, woo) / I might start a riot (Woo, woo, woo) / We grow, we learn and we live (Woo, woo, woo) / Opposite of quiet (Woo, woo, woo)". In the post-chorus, he details his fashion inspiration from wrestler Roddy Piper, who was known to wear kilts in the ring: "I just bought designer kilts, yeah, I Roddy Pipe it (Uh, uh) / I just put some BDs on my whip with lime green pipin' (Woo, woo, woo, woo, woo)". His first verse is performed almost a minute into the song, starting with a shout-out to his "wife", who is believed to be Rihanna: "My wife is erotic, I'm smokin' exotic (Woo, woo) / My whip is exotic, my crib is a cottage (Woo, woo, woo) / A wholе lotta cheesy, we gettin' that cottage (Woo, woo) / A wholе lotta brains, I skipped out on college (Woo, woo, woo)." Lyrically, Rocky brags about the expensive cars and clothes in his lifestyle and questions his critics. In the second verse, he continues to make references to Rihanna, name-drops Brent Faiyaz, and hints at a new collaboration with Rihanna.

== Music video ==
An official music video was released on July 25, 2023. Directed by ASAP Rocky and his AWGE collective, it finds Rocky riding through the streets of Kansas City in a massive tank as a marching mob of similarly dressed and masked people surround him, pulling large blow-up statues behind him. Rocky also shows off an array of cars, including a decorated Mercedes-Benz, along with tanks and fighter planes, handling business calls, representing his son RZA via a massive belt buckle, promoting Rihanna's Fenty Skin brand, throwing money all over himself in the street.

ASAP Rocky worked with his stylist Matthew Henson and London designer Mowalola Ogunlesi on styling for the video. The clip shows him wearing a pixel Damier-patterned Louis Vuitton boilersuit courtesy of Pharrell, Gerrit Jacob's American flag gear, a 1996 parachute bomber jacket designed by Issey Miyake and paired with Bottega Veneta boots, a long, slick trench coat of the same brand paired with an Hermès bag, a Coucoubebe leather jacket reading "DUMB SHIT", and an anti-FIFA football jersey with "HUMAN RIGHTS" plastered across the chest created by Hattie Crowthe.

== Charts ==
Chart performance for "Riot (Rowdy Pipe'n)"
Chart (2023)	Peak position
New Zealand Hot Singles (RMNZ)	20
US Hot R&B/Hip-Hop Songs (Billboard)	36
