= Bon Music Vision =

British multidisciplinary art duo

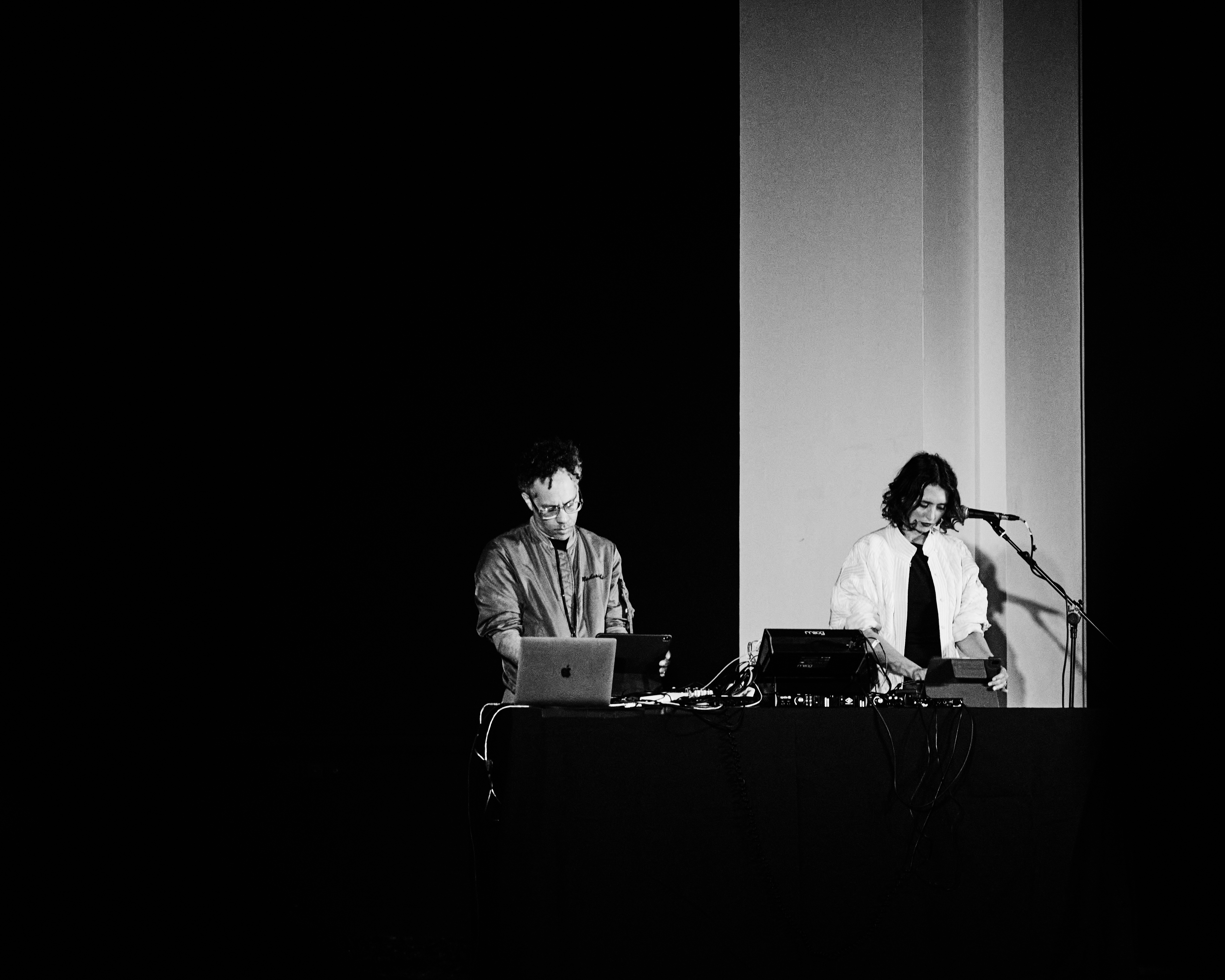
- Bon Music Vision performing at the V&A, 25 April 2025

Background information
- Origin: London, United Kingdom
- Genres: Experimental, electronic, ambient, dub, sound art
- Years active: 2018–present
- Labels: Hyperdub, Transgressive Records, True Panther Sounds, 4AD, Warp
- Members: Yerosha Windrich, Elfed Alexander Morris
- Website: bonmusicvision.co

Bon Music Vision is a multidisciplinary artist duo based in London, United Kingdom, consisting of Yerosha Windrich and Elfed Alexander Morris. They produce music, audiovisual works, and installation projects that incorporate electronic music, sound art, and visual storytelling, with a practice that prioritises collaboration with people of colour and within the queer community.

== Career ==
Bon Music Vision has developed a multidisciplinary practice that integrates electronic music, sound art, and visual storytelling while prioritising collaboration with artists from underrepresented backgrounds. The duo have worked with Belle Chen, producing the remix Three Birds (Bon Meditative Rework) for Chen's piano composition, reflecting an interest in expanding and decolonising approaches to classical music through electronic and ambient reinterpretation. They have also collaborated with Lucinda Chua, known for her work exploring cello and voice within contemporary and classical contexts, including on Bon’s album Pantheon, aligning with shared interests in reimagining classical forms within electronic and experimental frameworks.

Bon Music Vision has worked with a range of queer and trans artists, including Holland Andrews, who has collaborated as a guest vocalist and performer on live and recorded projects, and Angel-Ho, with whom Bon collaborated on releases including Alla Prima on Hyperdub. The duo has also worked with Mykki Blanco, contributing production and compositional elements in alignment with Blanco's work as a trans and non-binary artist within experimental and club music contexts.

Additional collaborations include working with Gaika on releases for Warp Records, including Spaghetto and Basic Volume; 潘Pan on releases for Transgressive Records; Bbymutha on the album Sleep Paralysis for True Panther Sounds; and Laraaji, who contributed to Bon’s album Pantheon. They have also co-produced and co-composed multiple tracks with Tsunaina, including Waterways, Unearth, and Fanned Out Fingers. Other projects include collaborations with Paola Estrella on the installation The Cenote Ring, and the commissioned soundtrack Juggernaut for Harri’s SS25 runway presentation at London Fashion Week. Bon Music Vision has also presented performances and installations at the Victoria and Albert Museum and Alexandra Palace, reflecting their engagement with major UK cultural institutions. The duo also composed the score for the short film If This Were Purgatory, which was selected for the BFI Flare Film Festival.

== Collaborations ==
Bon Music Vision has collaborated with a range of artists across music, visual art, and fashion, with contributions documented across albums and commissioned projects.

The duo has worked with Gaika on releases for Warp Records, including Spaghetto and Basic Volume; Lucinda Chua on the album Pantheon and on her 4AD releases, contributing to tracks including Until I Fall and You; 潘Pan on releases for Transgressive Records; Angel-Ho on projects including Alla Prima on Hyperdub; Bbymutha on the album Sleep Paralysis for True Panther Sounds; Laraaji, who contributed to Bon’s album Pantheon; and Mykki Blanco, contributing production and compositional elements in alignment with Blanco’s work as a trans and non-binary artist within experimental and club music contexts.

They have also co-produced and co-composed multiple tracks with Tsunaina, including Waterways, Unearth, and Fanned Out Fingers. Other collaborators include Holland Andrews as a guest vocalist and performer, Belle Chen (producing the remix Three Birds (Bon Meditative Rework)), Paola Estrella on the installation The Cenote Ring as part of Diasporas Now, and Harri on the runway soundtrack Juggernaut for Harri’s SS25 London Fashion Week presentation.

== Notable performances ==
Bon Music Vision has presented works and performances at:

- V&A Friday Late: Is This for Real? (Victoria and Albert Museum, 2024)
- REVERB at 180 Studios (2024)
- FutureSound 5th Anniversary (Alexandra Palace, 2025)
- The Cenote Ring at Soho House Mexico City and Studio Berlin (2025)
- Reference Point showcases at 180 The Strand (2023–24)

== Works ==
Bon Music Vision has released several albums, including:

- Pantheon (2022)
- The Emotion Industry (2023)
- Tracks From 33:33 (2021)
- First Sight (2021)
- Veritas (2022)

They have also produced soundtracks and audiovisual installations, including:

- Juggernaut (2025) – soundtrack for Harri's SS25 show
- If This Were Purgatory (2024) – short film score for the BFI Flare Film Festival
- The Cenote Ring (2024–25) – performance and installation with Paola Estrella

== Themes and style ==
Bon Music Vision’s practice blends modular synthesis, ambient fieldwork, and industrial sound design, influenced by Afrofuturism, speculative fiction, and sonic mysticism. Crack Magazine described them as "an inventive force creating at the intersection of club music and sound design."

== Media coverage ==
Bon Music Vision’s work has been covered by a range of independent music and arts publications. Crack Magazine described Bon as "an inventive force creating at the intersection of club music and sound design." Self-Titled Magazine referred to their collaboration with Laraaji as "a weightless exchange of sound waves and abstract ideas with ambient pioneer Laraaji." Mixmag called their work "an atmospheric ambient track that lulls and calms as it moves through its motions," while MusicRadar described their output as "abstract and atmospheric, a drifting, blissful sound-world that recalls the luxuriant tones of Brian Eno's LUX."

Magnetic Magazine noted that "the LP has an organic and natural feel to it, blending ambient compositions with the occasional classic electronica." Fluid Radio called their album "a natural wonder, gently unfolding and glowing." Bandcamp described Bon as capturing "the repetitive, generative patterns of nature with blissful reverence." Electronic Sound Magazine called their work "a modern ambient masterclass." The Fader encouraged listeners to "take a deep dive into the duo's atmospheric soundscapes."

Other outlets have highlighted their distinct approach: Wonderland called their single "Rajan" "disruptive but indispensable", while Dummy Mag praised their "otherworldly sonic narratives." OpenLab Radio described Bon’s work as "an insight into the electronic world of Artificial Intelligence and Sci Fi music." Foxy Digitalis noted, "ethereal vocal acrobatics bring a soft gloss to the hard-edged synths and blitzed-out beats," and Self-Titled Magazine has also featured interviews with the duo.

Their work has also been broadcast on BBC Radio 1 and BBC Radio 6 Music.
