= Camille Summers-Valli =

Music video director

- Born: Bangkok, Thailand
- Occupations: Music video director, artist
- Years active: 2014–present
- Spouse: Charles Melton (m. 2026)
- Children: 1

Camille Summers-Valli is a French-Australian artist, director and photographer. Her work includes music videos and commercials. She has won a UK Music Video Awards (UKMVA) for her music video direction and was nominated for a Cannes Lions award for her New York Times campaign. Her debut short film Untitled Woman premiered at TIFF and went on to be nominated for a British Independent Film Award in 2026.

== Early life ==
Summers-Valli was born in Thailand and raised in Nepal to documentary filmmaker parents. She graduated from Central Saint Martins in London in 2014 with a degree in Video Art and was selected to participate in the Bloomberg New Contemporaries exhibition of 2014 with her work Black Mesa.

== Career ==
=== Music Videos ===
Summers-Valli has directed music videos for artists such as Haim, BadBadNotGood, Låpsley, and METTE. She was awarded a Yellow Pencil for Direction in both the Music Video and Long Form categories for "MAMA'S EYES" with METTE at the 2024 D&AD Awards. Other works include "Relationships" (2025), co-produced by Rostam Batmanglij and Danielle Haim, featuring actor Drew Starkey, and BadBadNotGood’s "Beside April".

=== Commercials ===
In 2022, Summers-Valli was awarded D&AD Pencils for Art Direction and Editing for The Truth Takes a Journalist for The New York Times, directed What's Changing About Fashion's Relationship to the Body? for Vogue, and created commercials for brands including Hermès and Jean Paul Gaultier. In 2024, she directed The Audition and The Date for Coach’s "Unlock Your Courage" campaign, starring Elle Fanning and Charles Melton, and a campaign for On featuring Zendaya. In 2024, she was signed to MJZ for commercial representation in the US, UK, and the Netherlands.

=== Documentaries ===
In 2015, Summers-Valli made her directorial debut with the documentary feature, Big Mountain Diné Bikéyah, which focuses on the Navajo community's struggle to preserve their ancestral lands against corporate and governmental encroachment.

== Personal life ==
Summers-Valli is currently in a relationship with actor Charles Melton. In January 2026, it was announced that she was pregnant with their first child. On March 9, 2026, Melton confirmed the birth of their child via Instagram. On August 20, 2026, it was reported that Summers-Valli and Melton got married quietly.

== Select filmography ==
Year	Title	Contribution	Note
2015	Big Mountain Diné Bikéyah	Director and producer	Documentary
2019	Still I Rise	Director	Short film
2020	Swim Hunt Run	Director	Short film
2026	Untitled Woman	Director	Short film

=== Selected music videos ===
Year	Title	Artist/Band	Roles	Notes
2023	"MAMA'S EYES"	METTE	Director	
2023	"VAN GOGH"	METTE	Director	
2021	"Beside April"	BadBadNotGood	Director	
2019	"My Love Was Like The Rain"	Låpsley	Director	

== Awards and nominations ==
Year	Result	Award	Category	Work	Ref.
2023	Won	UK Music Video Awards	Video of the Year	METTE - "MAMA'S EYES"	
2023	Nominated	UK Music Video Awards	Best Director	METTE - "MAMA'S EYES"	
2023	Nominated	UK Music Video Awards	Best Pop Video – International	METTE - "MAMA'S EYES"	
2022	Won	Ad Age	Director to Watch		
2022	Won	AICP Awards	Web Film	The Truth Takes a Journalist	
2022	Won	D&AD Awards	Web Film	The Truth Takes a Journalist	
2022	Won	Clio Awards	Web Film	The Truth Takes a Journalist	
2022	Won	Webby Awards	Advertising, Media & PR	The Truth Takes a Journalist	
