= Same Problems? =

2023 single by ASAP Rocky

Single by ASAP Rocky
- Released: January 18, 2023
- Genre: Conscious hip hop
- Length: 4:22
- Label: AWGE; A$AP Worldwide; RCA Records
- Songwriters: Rakim Mayers; Miles McCollum; Miguel Pimentel; Tyler Okonma; Hector Delgado; Stephen Bruner
- Producers: ASAP Rocky; Tyler, the Creator; Delgado; Thundercat

ASAP Rocky singles chronology
"Chit Chat" (2023)	"Same Problems?" (2023)	"Riot (Rowdy Pipe'n)" (2023)

"Same Problems?" is a song by American rapper ASAP Rocky. It premiered during his Amazon Music Live Thursday Night Football performance on December 8, 2022, before being released on January 18, 2023. The song features background vocals from American rapper Lil Yachty and American singer Miguel. It was produced by Rocky himself, Tyler, the Creator, Hector Delgado and Thundercat.

== Background ==
In an interview with Zane Lowe on Apple Music 1, ASAP Rocky spoke in regard to the song:

I think I was feeling remorse. I think I was feeling plight. I think I was also feeling a sense of guilt, because every time we lose somebody in our community, we all, especially me, have a habit of just saying things like, "It's messed up. It's wrong. Why do these kind of things happen?" You ask a bunch of questions and usually … I never took time out to really understand that I was part of the problem because I was contributing those kind of lyrics and whatnot to songs. Without preaching too much, I just wanted to touch on something a bit different opposed to just being braggadocios, flamboyant, and just regular rap content for me. I just kind of wanted to express myself and tell how I felt without preaching. And I think we can all relate. We all got the same problems. The irony that my biggest hit to date was … My first hit was "Fuckin' Problems." And now 10 years later exactly, I'm putting out a song named "Same Problems." It's just like problems, problems, you know what I mean?

== Composition and lyrics ==
The song explores the dealing of loss, as ASAP Rocky reflects on the many deaths of rappers in the recent years and its connection to the struggles through each generation ("Niggas dyin' every other night / Niggas cryin', that's a part of life / Lyin' to my face (Solved), tryna say that it's all good / No, it's nothin'), over production composed of "cascading, tranquil" guitar strings, bass, little percussion and "euphoric" synths. In the chorus, he muses in reverberating, crooning vocals on the notion that he is potentially perpetuating the cycle of such problems including violence and drug abuse through his music: "How many problems get solved? / Am I a product of things that I saw? / How many problems get solved? / Am I proud of the things in my songs?" The hook also features scattered voices as if responding to him. Moreover, Rocky recounts his experiences of surviving through committing crimes in Harlem, with a reference to the song "Day 'n' Nite" by Kid Cudi. Lil Yachty and Miguel provide additional vocals via ad-libs throughout the song.

== Charts ==
Chart performance for "Same Problems?"
Chart (2023)	Peak position
New Zealand Hot Singles (RMNZ)	33
