= Iris van Herpen =

Dutch fashion designer (born 1984)

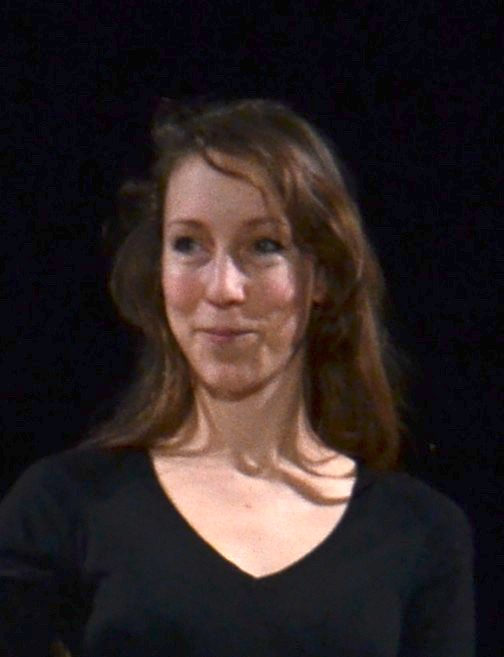
- Van Herpen during the Haute Couture Spring/Summer 2012
- Born: June 5, 1984 (age 42); Wamel, Netherlands
- Occupation: Fashion designer
- Label: Iris van Herpen
- Website: Iris van Herpen Official Website

Iris van Herpen (born June 5, 1984) is a Dutch fashion designer known for fusing technology with traditional haute couture craftsmanship. Van Herpen opened her label, Iris van Herpen, in 2007. In 2011, she became a guest member of the Parisian Chambre Syndicale de la Haute Couture, part of the Fédération française de la couture. Since then, she has continuously exhibited her new collections at Paris Fashion Week. Her work has been included in the Victoria & Albert Museum in London, the Metropolitan Museum of Art and Cooper Hewitt, Smithsonian Design Museum in New York, and the Palais de Tokyo in Paris.

== Career ==
After graduating from the ArtEZ University of the Arts in Arnhem in 2006, Iris van Herpen interned at Alexander McQueen in London and Claudy Jongstra in Amsterdam before launching her own label in 2007. The Dutch designer debuted her first couture collection, "Chemical Crows," at the 2007 Amsterdam Fashion Week.

Van Herpen was one of the first designers to adopt 3D printing as a garment construction technique.

Since 2009, pop star Lady Gaga has worn van Herpen's designs on several occasions. In 2012, Lady Gaga wore a custom shiny black couture dress for the launch of her perfume Fame. The shape of the perfume bottle served as the inspiration of the dress, which van Herpen constructed from laser-cut strips of black acrylic. Van Herpen has also made use of silicones, iron filings, and resin. Other celebrities to wear her work include Rihanna, Beyonce, and Tilda Swinton.

In 2017, van Herpen exhibited her work at the Dallas Museum of Art in an exhibition, "Transforming Fashion."

From 29 November 2023 to 28 April 2024, the Musée des Arts Décoratifs in Paris exhibited, "Iris van Herpen. Sculpting the Senses," which was described as a "tribute to one of the most forward-thinking fashion designers." The exhibit traveled to the Queensland Art Gallery | Gallery of Modern Art (QAGOMA), Brisbane, Australia (29 June – 7 October 2024), the ArtScience Museum, Singapore (15 March – 10 August 2025), Kunsthal Rotterdam (27 September 2025 – 1 March 2026), and the Brooklyn Museum (16 May – 6 December 2026). The exhibition was accompanied by a catalog by van Herpen and Cloé Pitiot.

== Future in fashion design ==
Notably, van Herpen was one of the first to present 3D-printed dresses in both static and flexible forms on the runway, in a collaboration with the Belgian company Materialise. Her Voltage collection explored the interaction between clothing and electricity. She used scanning electron microscope technology for her Micro collection. She is known for using unique materials as well as creating her own.

== Collaborations ==
Because of van Herpen's multidisciplinary approach to creation, she has collaborated with various artists such as Jolan van der Wiel and Neri Oxman and architects such as Philip Beesley and Benthem and Crouwel Architects. Her interest in science and technology has led to ongoing conversations with CERN (the European Organization for Nuclear Research) and the Massachusetts Institute of Technology.

Further collaborations include:

- Björk
- Benjamin Millepied
- Sasha Waltz
- Nick Knight
- Tsunaina

== Awards and recognition ==
- ANDAM Grand Prix Award (2014)
- STARTS Prize, granted by the European Commission (2016)
- Johannes Vermeer Award, Dutch state prize for the arts (2017)

== Gallery ==
Selected works
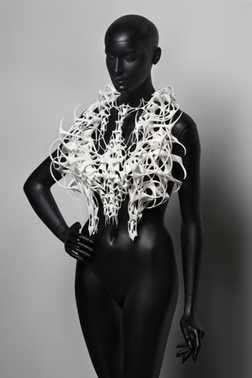
3-D printed neckpiece by van Herpen, 2011

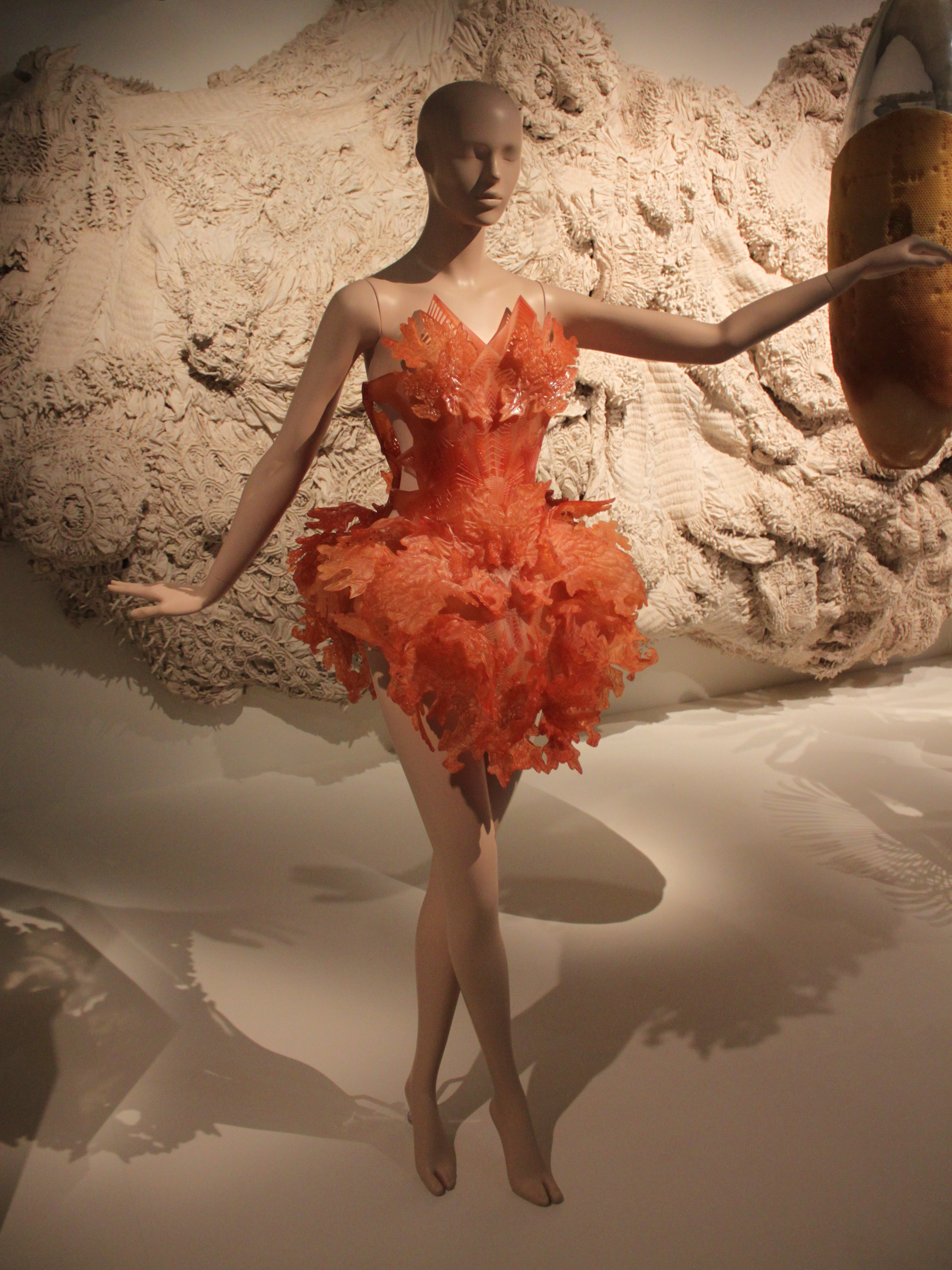
Dress in the Sculpting the Senses 2023-24 exhibition at the Musée des Arts Décoratifs in Paris

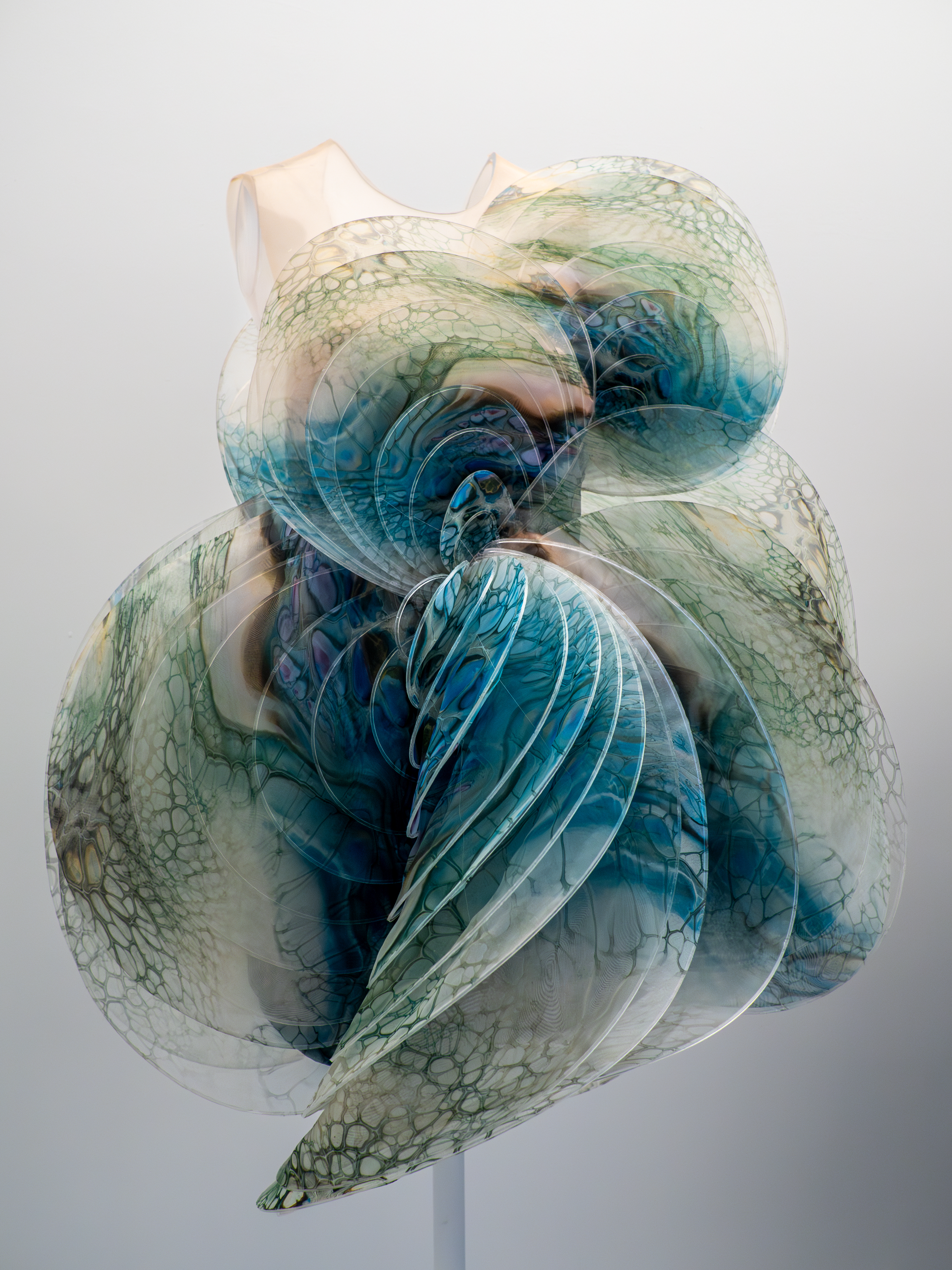
"Nautiloid" dress in the Sleeping Beauties: Reawakening Fashion exhibition at the Metropolitan Museum of Art, 2024

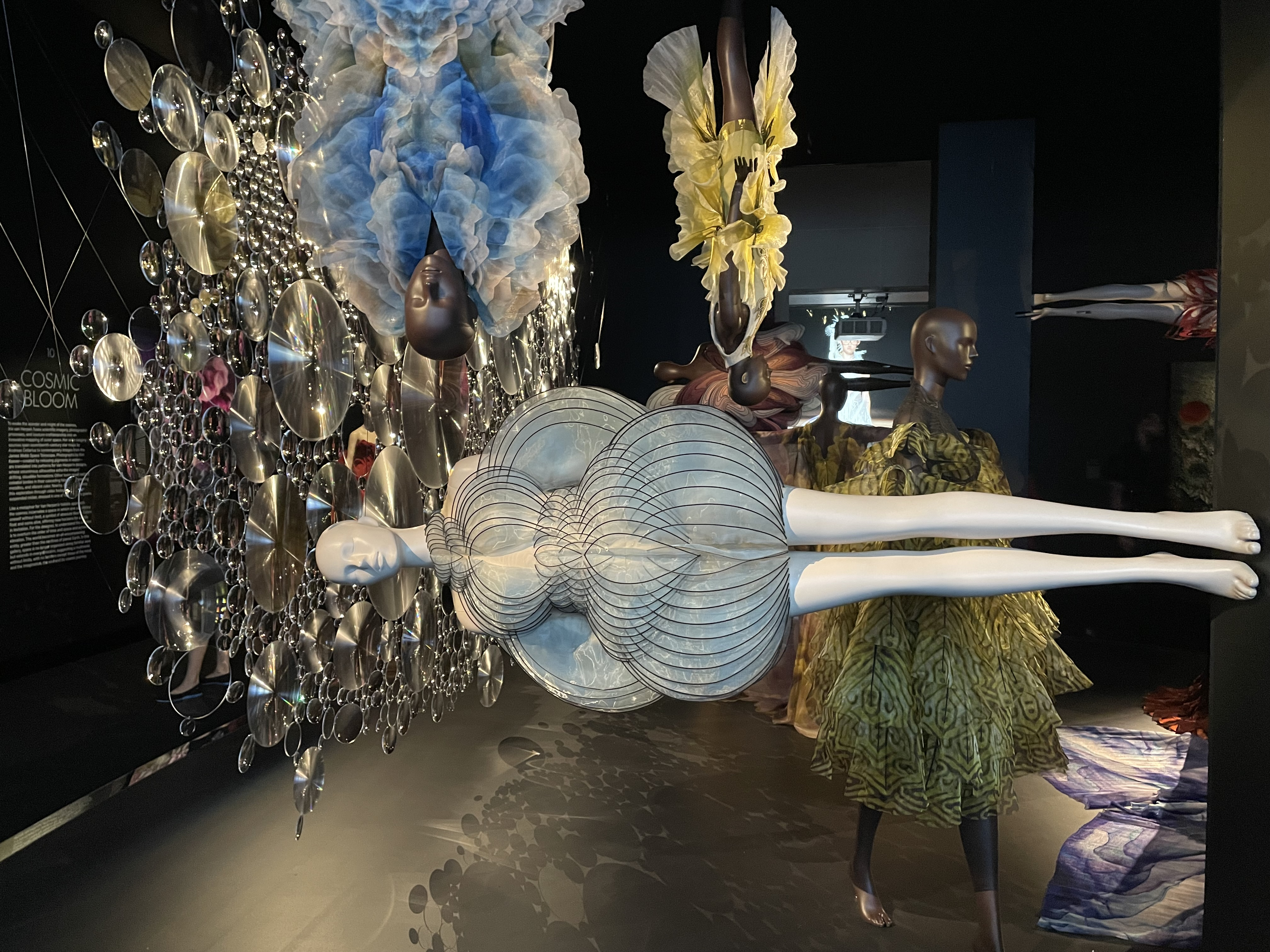
Cosmic Bloom installation at the Brooklyn Museum, 2026
