= BbyMutha =

American rapper

bbymutha
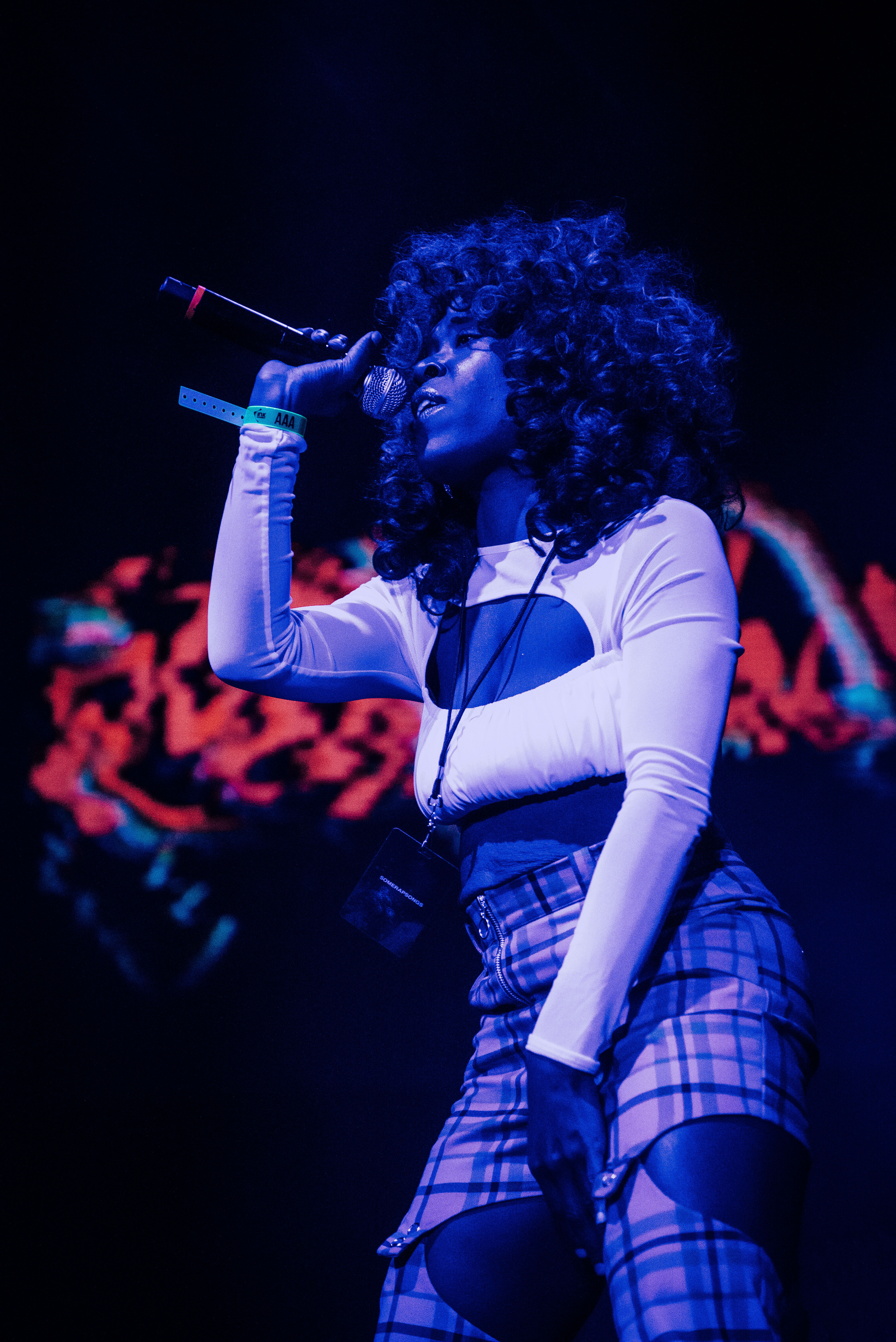
- Rebel Night Club on the Fire It Up tour w/ BBY Mutha & Liv.e (photo : Harrison Haines pour The Come Up Show)

Background information
- Born: Brittnee Moore; September 15, 1989 (age 37); Chattanooga, Tennessee, U.S.
- Genre: Hip-hop
- Occupation: Rapper
- Years active: 2014–present

Brittnee Moore, known professionally as bbymutha, is an American rapper. She was born in Chattanooga, Tennessee and began her career through SoundCloud. In 2017, she rose to prominence after the video for her song "Rules" went viral. Her debut studio album, Muthaland, was released in 2020.

== Early life ==
Moore was born and raised in Chattanooga, Tennessee. Both of her parents were in high school at the time of her birth. Moore was raised primarily by her mother, a devout Christian. She has stated that her father, a barber, was physically abusive. She has a younger brother.

Moore had a turbulent adolescence. At school, Moore was an outcast and was bullied. At the age of 12, she moved to Pensacola with her mother. After physically assaulting a teacher at her school, Moore was committed to a psychiatric ward, where she was diagnosed with depression and ADHD. She was expelled from the school and moved back to Tennessee. By the age of 13, Moore had begun selling drugs and having sex with older boys. At 17, she became pregnant with her first pair of twins, Mekel and Mekeila, who she has raised alone, describing the children's father as a 'pedophile'.

Moore would listen to rap music at her father's house during her summer break from school. Beginning in early childhood, she enjoyed writing. She began writing poetry in fourth grade, and became interested in music and performance after participating and winning a dance competition with her cousins in elementary school. She began rapping in tenth grade. During that year, Moore and her cousins formed a group called Money over Niggas.

== Career ==
Moore's "first official song" as a solo artist was "Slut". Moore released the song on SoundCloud. She performed under the stage name Cindyy Kushh from the age of "17 or 18", before changing her stage name to bbymutha. The name was inspired by her experience of being called a "baby mama" by the other female partner of her unfaithful boyfriend.

After working in retail and in call centers for several years, she became pregnant with her second pair of twins, Khloe and Tyler, after moving to Nashville to study fashion design. The father of the twins was abusive, and he disapproved of Moore's rapping, leading Moore to take a hiatus from her rap career. After giving birth to her second pair of twins, Moore moved back to Chattanooga and returned to rapping. In December 2015, she released a three-song EP entitled Weave.

=== Breakthrough ===
In December 2016, Moore released the EP Glow Kit. The EP was included in "20 best Bandcamp releases of 2017". In 2017, the track "Rules", which was produced by Luna God, was released as a single from the EP. The music video for the song was later released in August on YouTube. The video went viral, and led to Moore to receive attention from prominent R&B musicians SZA and Kehlani. The track was also played by Björk as part of a DJ set, and was featured in FADER's "101 best songs of 2017". In 2019, "Rules" was included in the soundtrack of the Hulu original series Ramy.

In 2018, Moore has released three EPs so far. In January 2018, Muthaz Day 2 was released. The EP featured production from Rock Floyd and Crystal Caines. This was followed by BbyShoe, which was released in February 2018 to positive reviews. The EP also received praise from Pitchfork. In May 2018, Moore released a surprise EP entitled Free Brittanee. Moore performed at Toronto Pride in June 2018.

"Indian Hair", a track from Moore's 2015 EP, Weave, featured in the soundtrack to the second season of Netflix series Dear White People.

=== Retirement, Mutha Magick Apothecary, and comeback ===
On August 28, 2020, after years of delays, her debut studio album, Muthaland, was finally released on music distribution platforms. Declaring it her last official release, she expressed her frustrations via Twitter with the process behind making the album, adding how much stress it caused her. The album received positive reviews from music publications, with critics praising the lyrics and creativity. Pitchfork scored the album an 8.0 rating, with contributor Dylan Green writing "It's a deliriously entertaining, ambitious project from an artist operating at her peak". She started an apothecary, named Mutha Magick Apothecary, selling soaps, candles, and essential oils among other products. In addition, she also plans to open a physical brick-and-mortar store for the company, while also focusing on possibly releasing a mini-EP to be made exclusively available on OnlyFans, and a documentary. She soon recanted her statements on retirement and appeared to make a comeback with the release of her EP Muthaleficient 2 on March 2, 2021. She later released the third volume of her Bastard Tapes EPs, The Bastard Tapes, Vol. 3 on May 10, 2021. Tom Breihan for Stereogum describes it as "[not] as musically far-out as Muthaleficent 2. Instead, it's mostly hard, fundamental Southern rap. [...] Mostly, though, the appeal is just Bbytalking fly, charismatic, nasty shit. She is extremely good at doing that." In 2024, she released her album Sleep Paralysis, working alongside producers such as Foisey, Bon Music Vision, and Kilde.

=== Influences ===
Moore has credited Gucci Mane as her biggest musical influence. She has also listed Southern hip-hop artists Trina, La Chat, and Gangsta Boo as influences. She has described her music as being influenced by living in the ghetto in Chattanooga. Her music is also influenced by her religious upbringing in Tennessee, in the Bible Belt.

She is known for having a colorful fashion sense and frequently wearing different wigs. Moore has named Jimi Hendrix, Lil Kim, and Kelis as style influences.

== Personal life ==
Moore lives in Tennessee with her four children. Her father lives next door to her and helps her with childcare when she travels to perform. In a 2015 interview, Moore stated that she is not at a point in her life where she is ready for a relationship, having previously had unhealthy relationships. Moore is bisexual and non-binary, using they/them and she/her pronouns.

== Discography ==
=== Albums ===
- Muthaland (2020)
- sleep paralysis (2024)
- rent due (2026)

=== EPs ===
- Belkin54G (2014)
- Muthaz Day (2015)
- Weave (2015)
- Glow Kit: Blk Girl (2016)
- BbyShoe (2018)
- Free Brittnee (2018)
- Muthaz Day 2 (2018)
- Muthaz Day 3 (2018)
- The Bastard Tapes, Vol. 1 (2018)
- The Bastard Tapes, Vol. 2 (2019)
- Muthaleficient (2020)
- idntlikeu. (2020)
- Muthaleficient 2 (2021)
- Bastard Tapes, Vol. 3 (2021)
- CHERRYTAPE (2021)
- left4dead (2022)
- MUTHALEFIC3NT (2022)
- left4dead 2 (2022)
- left4dead 3 (2023)
- FREE BRITTNEE 2 (2023)
