= Universal Credit (album) =

2022 studio album by Jeshi

Studio album by Jeshi
- Released: 27 May 2022
- Genre: Hip hop
- Length: 37:37
- Label: Because Music
- Producer: Cadenza; Cajm; Earbuds; Fredwave; Jean Bleu; Jim-E Stack; JONAH; Kelvin Krash; KIKO; SAMO; Tev'n

Jeshi chronology
Bad Taste (2020)	Universal Credit (2022)

Universal Credit is the debut studio album by British rapper Jeshi, released on 27 May 2022. It was preceded by four singles: "Generation", "Another Cigarette", "3210", and "Protein". The album features appearances from Obongjayar and Fredwave.

== Background and themes ==
The album's title is a reference to the Universal Credit welfare policy. On the album cover, Jeshi depicts himself receiving an oversized cheque for £324.84, which was the value of a monthly Universal Credit payment at the time of the album's release. Jeshi has stated that his intent with the title was to push back against the stigma around receiving Universal Credit benefits, describing the title as "me taking back two words that often mean embarrassment for people and trying to give a new life to that through my truth".

The album's subject matter includes topics such as life under austerity, knife crime, drug use, and the psychological impacts of social media. Jeshi has described himself as striving to depict everyday, down-to-earth situations like "taking the night bus home after work".

== Critical reception ==
Professional ratings
Aggregate scores
Source	Rating
Metacritic	83/100
Review scores
Source	Rating
Clash	8/10
Pitchfork	7.6/10
The Telegraph	4/5 stars

At Metacritic, which assigns a weighted average score out of 100 to reviews from mainstream critics, Universal Credit received an average score of 83 based on 4 reviews, indicating "universal acclaim".

Critics described the prevailing mood of the album as a morose one. Telegraph.co.uk characterised Universal Credit as "an angst-ridden record", and Complex described it as "an emotionally vulnerable... journey through the rapper's psyche". Reviewers noted that there were some happier moments on the album – Pitchfork noted that "Jeshi captures life's small joys as well as its multifold indignities" – but these moments were typically portrayed as "unapologetically few and far between". Jeshi's detailed lyrics about the hardships of poverty were praised, with The Line of Best Fit stating that the album "expertly taps into the modern conundrum of social malaise", and reviewers from Pitchfork and Telegraph expressing similar sentiments. Jeshi's delivery was described in Crack magazine as "anthemic, straight-talking rap". A more mixed review from Clash remarked that Universal Credit "shows great potential, but its drop in momentum in the first half marks it as a project that hasn't quite lived up to its own standards".

The production on Universal Credit has been described as "fittingly jagged". The Line of Best Fit identifies its main features as "a rich palette of evocative pianos, unintelligible vocal cuts, nostalgic two-step shuffles and arpeggiated guitars". The Telegraph review also describes the usage of sampled urban noise as "creat[ing] an enjoyably textured realm".

Dazed identified Universal Credit as the sixth-best hip hop album of 2022.

== Track listing ==
No.	Title	Producer(s)	Length
1.	"1st of the Month for the Rest of Your Life..."	Cajm	0:32
2.	"Sick"	Kelvin Krash	3:14
3.	"Killing Me Slowly"	Kelvin Krash; JONAH	2:49
4.	"Another Cigarette"	Earbuds; SAMO; KIKO	3:17
5.	"Coffee"	Fredwave	2:06
6.	"Hit by a Train"	JONAH	3:08
7.	"3210" (with Fredwave)	Cadenza; Tev'n	3:11
8.	"Generation"	Tev'n; Jim-E Stack; JONAH	3:30
9.	"New Hues"	Earbuds	3:27
10.	"Protein" (with Obongjayar)	Earbuds; Jean Bleu	2:55
11.	"Two Mums"	Tev'n; JONAH	3:19
12.	"Violence" (with Fredwave and Obongjayar)	Tev'n	2:41
13.	"National Lottery"	JONAH	3:28
Total length:			37:37
