= The Blaze (band) =

French musical duo

- Genres: French house; Electronic; dance; ambient
- Years active: 2016–present
- Labels: Animal 63; Columbia Records; RCA Records
- Members: Guillaume Alric; Jonathan Alric
- Website: theblazeprod.com

The Blaze are a Paris-based ambient electronic dance music duo consisting of two cousins, Guillaume and Jonathan Alric. Their method involves producing sound and visuals at the same time, creating a strong link between music and image. They have released two albums, Dancehall (2018) and Jungle (2023), as well as one EP, Territory (2017).

== History ==
Guillaume Alric and Jonathan Alric began making music together after Jonathan, who was born in the Ivory Coast and was at film school in Brussels, asked Guillaume to work with him on a music video soundtrack for a class.

In January 2016, they released their debut video, "Virile," on Brodinski's Bromance Records. In October 2016, it won Best Alternative Video - International at the UK Music Video Awards.

On 7 April 2017, they released their debut EP, Territory, on the new Animal 63 label (headed by management and publishing company Savoir Faire and Believe Digital). The EP's six tracks included "Virile" and "Territory." Their "Territory" music video, released in February 2017, produced and directed by themselves, won the Film Craft Grand Prix at the 2017 Cannes Lions International Festival of Creativity, Best Director at the Berlin Music Video Awards, and the Best International Dance Video UK MVA.

"Heaven," their third video, was released in February 2018. It captures an idyllic outdoor scene amid a community of family and friends.

In 2018, they performed at Coachella, Primavera Sound, the Roskilde Festival, Lollapalooza, Pitchfork Paris, Parklife, Lovebox, and Reading and Leeds Festivals.

Their debut full-length album Dancehall was released in September 2018. Its 10 tracks include the single "Heaven," along with the singles "She" and "Faces" which were released in summer 2018.

Their second album, Jungle, was released in March 2023. The song 'LONELY' from this album was included in the EA Sports FC 24 soundtrack, with the game releasing on 22 September 2023.

In September 2023, they performed at Cala Mijas.

They performed at the Igloofest festival in Montreal in February 2024.

== Discography ==
=== Studio albums ===
- Dancehall (Animal 63/Columbia/RCA, 2018)
- Jungle (Animal 63 2023)

=== EPs ===
- Territory (Animal 63)

=== Singles ===
Title	Year	Album
"Enemy"	2024	Non-album single
"Dreamer"	2023	Jungle
"Eyes"	2023	Jungle
"Somewhere" (featuring Octavian)	2020	Non-album single
"She"	2018	Dancehall
"Queens"	2018	Dancehall
"Heaven"	2018	Dancehall
"Territory"	2017	Territory
"Virile"	2017	Territory
