= Cari Cari =

Austrian indie rock duo

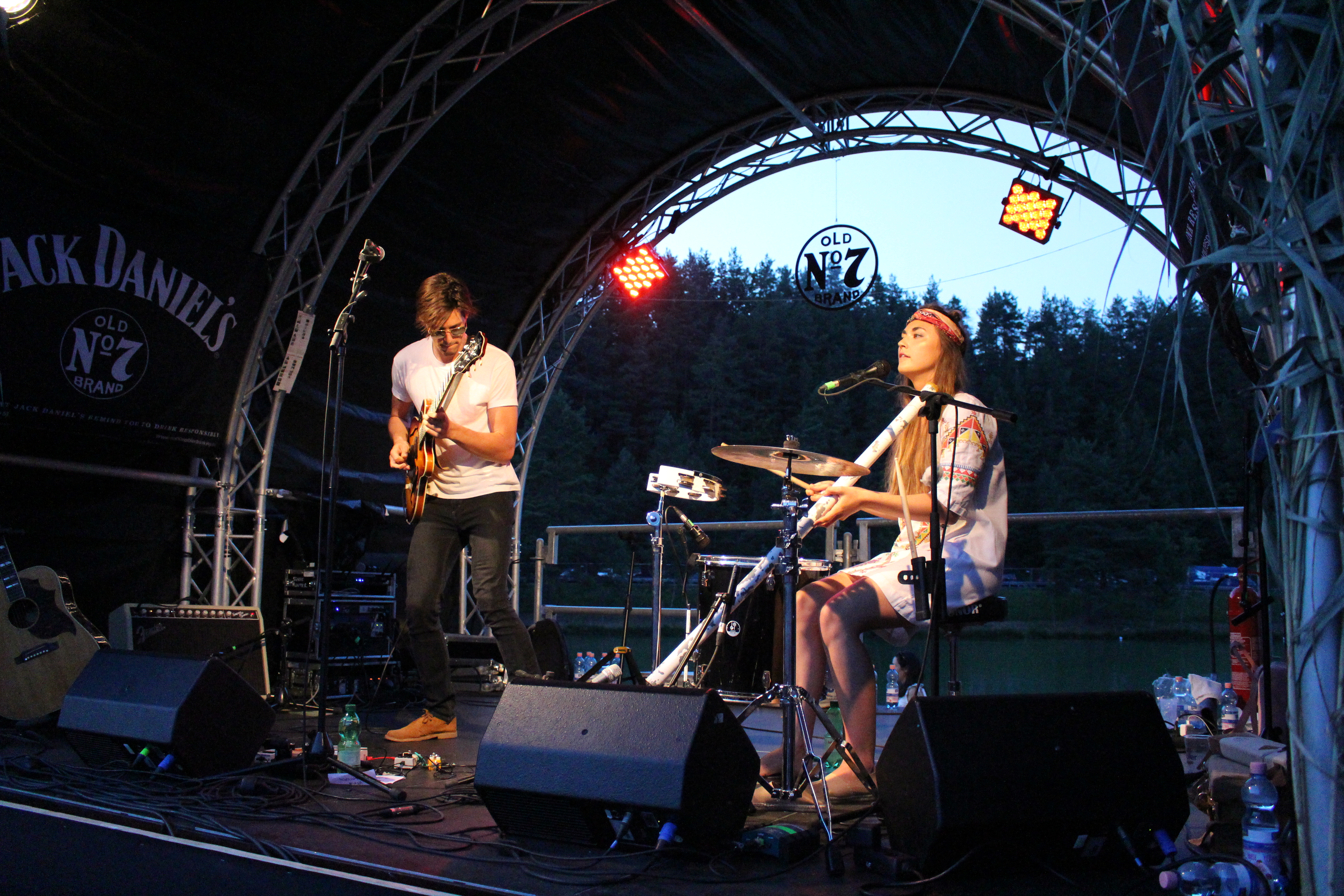
- Cari Cari performing in 2017

Background information
- Origin: Austria
- Genres: Indie rock
- Members: Stephanie Widmer; Alexander Köck
- Website: caricariragazzi.com

Cari Cari is an Austrian indie rock duo consisting of drummer and singer Stephanie Widmer and guitarist/singer Alexander Köck. They have stated that they formed the band to get their music in a Quentin Tarantino film. As of 2025, they have released three studio albums, one EP, and two live recordings.

== History ==
In 2014, the duo released the EP Amerippindunkler and followed it with a tour through Australia, including shows in Darwin, Cairns, and Melbourne. Their songs "No War" and "White Line Fever" were featured in the American TV series Shameless and The Magicians.

In 2017, they were awarded the XA Award – Austrian Music Export Award at Waves Vienna and performed at festivals such as Primavera Sound in Barcelona, Eurosonic Noorderslag in the Netherlands, and the Great Escape Festival in England.

In 2018, Cari Cari released their debut full-length studio album, titled Anaana. In 2021, they issued Live at Nikolaisaal Potsdam, recorded with the Film Orchestra Babelsberg. In 2022, they released the album Welcome to Kookoo Island and won the radio FM4 Award at the Amadeus Austrian Music Awards.

In 2023, Cari Cari issued FM4 Radio Session, a live recording with the Radio Symphony Orchestra Vienna. In 2025, they published their third studio album, titled One More Trip Around the Sun.

== Band members ==
- Stephanie Widmer – drums, vocals
- Alexander Köck – guitar, vocals

== Discography ==
Studio albums

- Anaana (2018)
- Welcome to Kookoo Island (2022)
- One More Trip Around the Sun (2025)

EPs

- Amerippindunkler (2014)

Live albums

- Live at Nikolaisaal Potsdam with Film Orchestra Babelsberg (2021)
- FM4 Radio Session with Radio Symphony Orchestra Vienna (2023)

Singles

- 2017: "Nothing's Older Than Yesterday" (2017)
- "Mapache" (2018)
- "Summer Sun" (2018)
- "My Grandma Says We Have No Future" (2023)
- "Pluton (feat. kenrey Z) (2024)
- "Farfalla/Schmetterling" (2024)
- "If u know u know" (2024)

== Awards and nominations ==
Award ceremony	Year	Category	Nominee/work	Result
Waves Vienna	2017	XA Award – Austrian Music Export Award	Cari Cari	Won
Amadeus Austrian Music Awards	2022	FM4 Award	Cari Cari	Won
