= AntsLive =

British rapper

- Born: Anton Raphael Baleanu; 12 February 2000 (age 26)
- Origin: London, England
- Genres: Hip hop, UK rap, UKG
- Years active: 2020–present

Anton Raphael Baleanu, known as AntsLive (born 2000) is a British rapper and record producer.

== Biography ==
Ants was born in North London to a Romanian father, who would play Latin-American music around the house, and a Sierra Leone mother, who loved MoTown classics. When Ants turned seven, he got his first CD player and a copy of 50 Cent's 2007 album Curtis, sparking his passion for hip-hop and spurring him to download torrents of rap through LimeWire. At the wish of his grandma, he started to write poetry aged just eight.

Before he became devoted to music, Ants also had a passion for sport. He was scouted for Chelsea's U16 when he was six-years-old, and he practised football six days a week until he turned 16.

Before going solo when Covid hit, AntsLive and his friends Tejy, an R&B singer from North West London and producer Jay Blu formed the trio Trademark.

== Awards ==
The video for "Number One Candidate" won the award for the best hip hop/grime/rap video at the 2023 UK Music Video Awards. AntsLive was nominated in the best newcomer category at the 2024 MOBO Awards.

=== Berlin Music Video Awards ===
The video "Billie Holiday" was nominated for the award Best Narrative in the 2026 edition.

== Discography ==
All of Ants' songs are published on Spotify. These include:

=== Mixtapes ===
- Just A Matter Of Time (2023)
- Real Life (2024)
- We Live. (2026)

=== Singles + EP ===
Title	Year	Features
Brown Liquor	2020	Non-album singles
Tokyo Freestyle	2020	Non-album singles
Shenanigans	2021	Non-album singles
HBK	2021	Non-album singles
Tweakin	2022	Non-album singles
Bite the Bullet	2022	Non-album singles
Glow Up	2022	Non-album singles
Skeet	2022	Non-album singles
Ooh La La	2023	Non-album singles
Captain Ants	2023	Non-album singles
C'est La Vie	2023	Non-album singles
Cutlery	2024	Non-album singles
Estelle	2024	Non-album singles
Toxic Minds by Blaze YL*	2024	(feat. AntsLive & joe unknown)
Frostbite	2024	Non-album singles
Perfect Timing (with Len)	2024	Non-album singles
Richer	2024	Non-album singles
UK Baddie (with SL)	2024	Non-album singles
Alexa (with Kairo Keyz)	2024	Non-album singles
Sex on the Beach	2024	Non-album singles
V (with Sainté)	2024	Non-album singles
On the Radar Freestyle	2024	Non-album singles
Crew Love	2025	Non-album singles
Inconsistent by Glizz*	2025	(feat. AntsLive)
Valentine's Type Beat (with Sainté)	2025	Non-album singles
Skincare Riddim by Col3trane*	2025	(feat. AntsLive & Erick the Architect)
ABC's	2025	Non-album singles
BILLIE HOLIDAY	2025	Non-album singles
12 CAR CONVOY	2025	Non-album singles
FIRST CLASS LANDING.	2026	(feat. Knucks & BAWO)
RACKS.	2026	(feat. WIU )
Pink Rosé	2026	Non-album singles
