= Anaiis =

French singer-songwriter

anaiis
- Genres: Alternative; Soul
- Occupations: Singer; songwriter
- Years active: 2018–present
- Labels: 5dB Records, Dream Sequence Recordings
- Website: anaiis.world

Anaiis (stylized anaiis) is a French-Senegalese singer-songwriter who was raised in America and is now based in London. She is noted for her diverse style, introspective lyrics and her multilingual singing ability.

== Biography ==
Anaiis was born in Toulouse, France. While growing up, her family frequently moved from city to city, including Dublin, Dakar, Oakland, New York City, and London, where she would eventually relocate and settle. She attended NYU's Tisch School of the Arts.

In 2018, she released Before Zero, her debut EP. The following year, she released Darkness at Play, produced by Om'Mas Keith. She would go on to release a number of singles from 2019 to 2021, including "Vanishing", which she performed on A COLORS Show. In September 2021, she released her debut album This Is No Longer a Dream via Dream Sequence Recordings.

In 2024, anaiis collaborated with Brazilian artists Biel Basile, Sessa & Marcelo Cabral to form the group 'anaiis & Grupo Cosmo' and released a self-titled 7 track project. The band performed the project live from BBC Maida Vale which was featured on Jamz Supernova's BBC Radio 6 Music show.

In 2025, she released Devotion & The Black Divine which was named an Album of the Year by BBC Radio 6 Music and The New Yorker. She followed the album release with a sold out show at London's Islington Assembly Hall

In 2026, anaiis announced a 13 date Devotion & The Black Divine North America tour, her first headline shows in America and Canada, Shortly followed by an announcement of her largest UK and Europe tour to date, including a London headline at KOKO

== Discography ==
Studio albums

- Darkness at Play (2019)
- This Is No Longer a Dream (2021)
- Devotion & the Black Divine (2025)

EPs

- Before Zero (2018)
- anaiis & Grupo Cosmo (2024)
- Live from BBC Maida Vale Studios (2025)

Singles

- "Nina" (2018)
- "No Control" (2018)
- "Lost My Faith" (2019)
- "Learn to Love" (2020)
- "Vanishing" (A Colors Show) (2020)
- "Juno" (2021)
- "Reverie" (2021)
- "Chuu" (featuring Topaz Jones) (2021)
- "Cry in Your Sleep" (featuring Chronixx) (2021)
- "Toda Cor" (2024)
- "Honeydew" (2024)
- "BPE" (2024)
- "To Zion" (Lauryn Hill Cover) (2025)
- "Deus Deus (2025)
- "Dreamer Too" (2025)
- "My World (Beyond)" (2025)
- "Sunshine / P4P" (2026)
