= Gangsta (Free Nationals, ASAP Rocky and Anderson .Paak song) =

2024 single by Free Nationals, ASAP Rocky and Anderson .Paak

Single by Free Nationals, ASAP Rocky and Anderson .Paak
- Released: February 23, 2024
- Genre: Hip hop; retro-soul
- Length: 3:14
- Label: Apeshit; Empire
- Songwriters: José Ríos; Ron Avant; Kelsey Gonzalez; Callum Connor; Rakim Mayers; Brandon Anderson
- Producers: Free Nationals; Anderson .Paak

Free Nationals singles chronology
"Through the Night" (2023)	"Gangsta" (2024)

ASAP Rocky singles chronology
"Riot (Rowdy Pipe'n)" (2023)	"Gangsta" (2024)	"Highjack" (2024)

Anderson .Paak singles chronology
"Is It Worth It" (2024)	"Gangsta" (2024)	"86Sentra" (2024)

Music video
- "Gangsta" on YouTube

"Gangsta" is a song by American R&B band Free Nationals and American rappers ASAP Rocky and Anderson .Paak. It was released on February 23, 2024, with an accompanying music video.

== Composition ==
"Gangsta" is a retro-soul song combining elements of funk and jazz, and has been described as "free-flowing". The production contains "psychedelic strings, pocket drumming, movie samples, and record scratches". The song opens with the chorus, sung by Anderson .Paak, followed by a verse from ASAP Rocky, who reflects on how his father taught him his "gangster" ways and boasts the extravagant aspects of his lifestyle, including women.

== Critical reception ==
Tallie Spencer of HotNewHipHop called the song a "testament to the creative synergy that occurs when like-minded artists come together to push the boundaries of musical expression" and "standout track, solidifying its place as a must-listen in the evolving landscape of contemporary music." Aaron Williams of Uproxx commented the song "amalgamates the signature components of each act, and results in untouchable musical chemistry." In addition, he described the production as "brilliant", that ASAP Rocky "taps into a sense of bravado", and Anderson .Paak's "soulful" performance as "somehow making the life of a gangster sound smooth and sweet."

== Music video ==
The music video was directed by François Rousselet and is set in a world governed by children. Kid versions of ASAP Rocky and Anderson .Paak wear stylish outfits and drive through a cartoon Los Angeles in a muscle car, where the streets are lined with playhouses; they rob a liquor store with others, perform in front of a private jet, defend themselves in court, engage in Super Soaker shootouts and throw Molotov cocktails. In one scene, it is revealed that the events of the video are from the imagination of a child playing in a bathtub.

== Charts ==
Chart performance for "Gangsta"
Chart (2024)	Peak position
New Zealand Hot Singles (RMNZ)	12
