= Anete Salinieka =

Make-up Artist

- Born: Anete Salinieka; 8 August 1990 (age 35); Latvia
- Education: London College of Fashion
- Occupation: Make-up artist
- Website: https://anete.studio

Anete Salinieka (born 8 August 1990) is a make-up artist from London, United Kingdom.

== Early life ==
Born and raised in Latvia, she began her career by enrolling in art school at 16, with a focus on fashion and styling. She was intrigued about the potential for artistic expression through make-up and, at the age of 17, began working as a make-up artist while continuing her studies.

In 2011, Salinieka moved to London to study fashion design at the London College of Fashion. After graduating, Salinieka made the decision to immerse herself in the world of make-up and began assisting established artists like Isamaya Ffrench and Peter Philips.

== Career ==
Salinieka worked on fashion and beauty editorials for several notable publications, including Vogue, Elle, Glamour and Interview. Names such as Numéro, Document Journal, Dazed, AnOther, GQ, T: The New York Times Style Magazine, HTSI – Financial Times, Wonderland and Material Magazine are among the other publications that feature her work.

Her editorial and campaign collaborations encompass clients such as Dior, Burberry, Vivienne Westwood, Moncler, Bally, Chanel, Mulberry, and Hermès.

In 2020, Salinieka was the lead make-up artist for Dior Men's Spring/Summer 2021 digital presentation (directed and shot by Jackie Nickerson) that was revealed online due to the pandemic.

She is a frequent collaborator, known for partnering with beauty brands such as Byredo, Rose Inc, Isamaya Beauty, and Browns, to create social media content that showcases tutorials and images directed by herself.

In July 2021, Salinieka was featured in Rose Inc's Artist in Residency series where she devoted four weeks to creating a series of self-portraits showcasing her distinctive make-up styles. She returned for another residency month at Rose Inc, again in June 2022.

She served as a guest contributor authoring articles about beauty, skincare and make-up trends as well as sharing her expertise on make-up techniques in printed and digital publications like L'Officiel and Allure.

Salinieka's work as a make-up artist extended to music videos, where she collaborated with various artists, including Yves Tumor, Razorlight, Hot Chip, Kylie Minogue, Jessie Ware, Franz Ferdinand, These New Puritans, Sons of Raphael, Yxng Bane, Ashnikko, Kojey Radical, Áine Cahill, and Flo Morrissey.

== Artistry ==
Salinieka is known for her ability to create make-up that blends vintage with contemporary looks.

"Primarily inspired by ‘60s – ‘80s makeup, the burgeoning artist sources inspiration from all mediums. “Aside from drawing inspiration or referencing already existing beauty moments, I often look at other types of art, such as painting or sculpture or even music," Anete says. "These sources can transform into new ideas, whether it’s a color combo or simply a feeling, that then transform into a beauty look." "

She acknowledges that various sources, ranging from old beauty adverts to vintage cookbooks, can inspire her when it comes to selecting colors, revealing that seemingly unrelated things can unexpectedly spark new ideas for beauty looks.
