= Belle Chen =

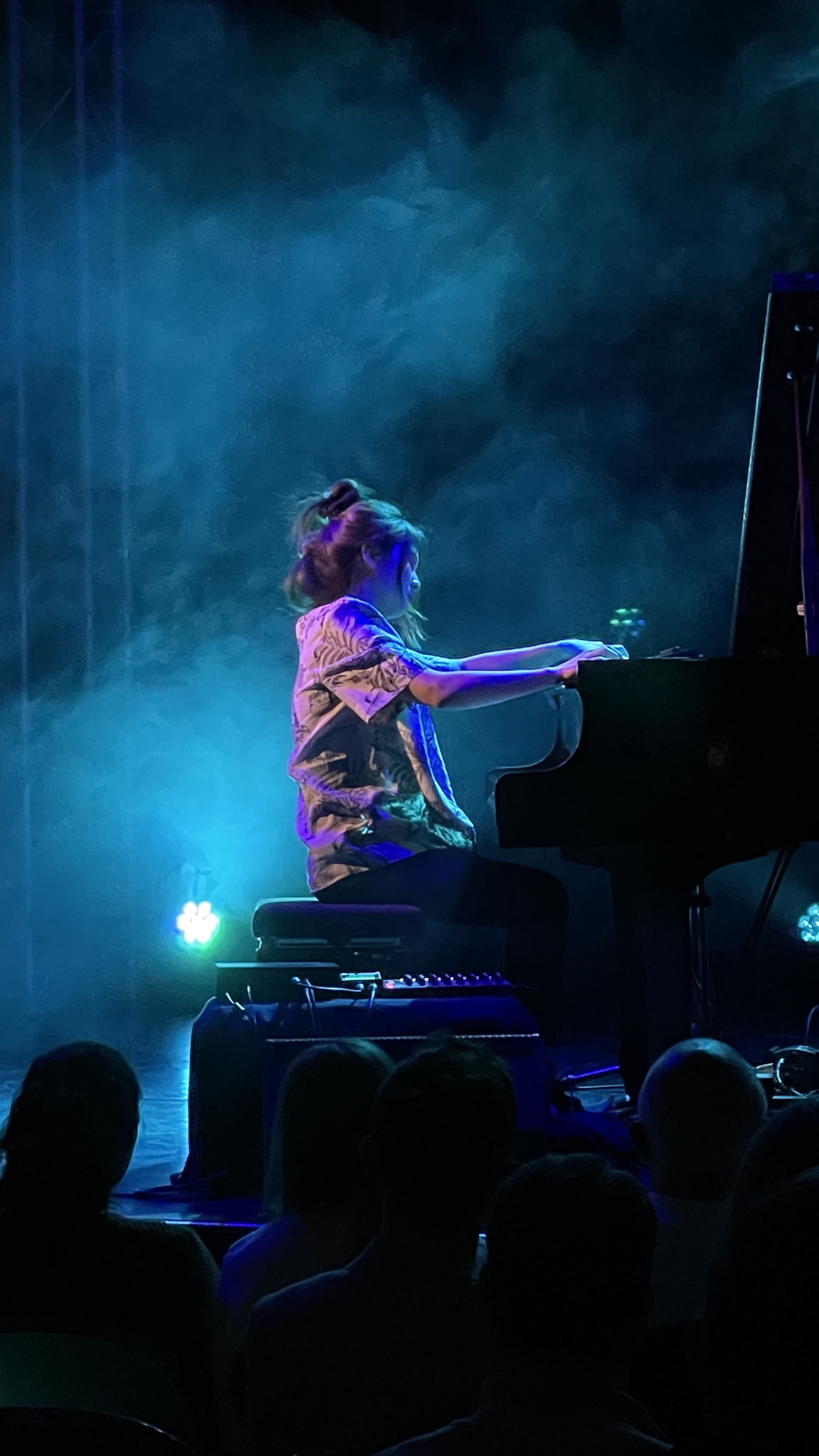
- Belle Chen in performance 2024

Background information
- Born: 17 August 1988 (age 37); Kaohsiung, Taiwan
- Origin: Taiwan
- Genres: Classical, experimental, sound art, electronica, neo-classical, ambient
- Occupations: Pianist, sound artist, producer
- Instruments: Piano, keys, sound art, electronics
- Years active: 2010-present
- Labels: Eito Music, Platoon (Apple Inc)
- Website: www.bellechen.com

Belle Chen (born 17 August 1988) is an Australian-Taiwanese pianist, composer, and producer based in London, United Kingdom.

== Biography ==
Born in Kaohsiung, Taiwan and raised in Brisbane, Australia, Belle Chen was a national finalist of Australian National Piano Award in 2010. In 2011, she relocated to London to study at Royal Academy of Music, and it was during this time that Chen began experimenting with integrating sound art with classical music, eventually leading to improvising and composing her own original music. In 2015, Chen was voted as the winner of Classical Rising Star Award at London Music Awards. She has appeared on BBC Radio 3, BBC China, Monocle 24, BBC World Service, ABC FM, Finland Classic Radio, Macroview TV Taiwan, amongst others.

Chen's works have been described as "original and provocative" by Brian Eno and selected as the winner of Curator's Choice for Music Award at 2014 NOISE Festival. With her newfound musical style, Chen debuted as BBC Introducing artist at 2016 Latitude Festival. Max Reinhardt, who saw Chen's performance on BBC Introducing Stage, described her as "a revelation" on BBC Radio 6. In 2016, Chen performed at Royal Festival Hall for BBC Radio 3's 70th Anniversary Celebration. In the same year, she founded her own label Eito Music, distributed by The Orchard (company)/Sony.

In 2018, Chen was one of nine jury-selected showcase artists to perform at 2018 Classical:NEXT at De Doelen, where she appears in the representation of Australia and the United Kingdom, and thereby becoming the first Australian artist to perform at the world's largest global art music conference. In the same year, Chen is elected as Associate of Royal Academy of Music for significant contribution to the music profession.

In 2019, Chen was nominated for Australian Music Prize for her experimental classical album ‘Departure.’ In the same year, she sat on the judging panel for Paul Hamlyn Foundation Award for Composers. She is a Yamaha artist and appeared on the company's CK88 global campaign.

As a composer, her works have been performed by BBC Concert Orchestra and BBC Philharmonic, with syncs for London Fashion Week, Shanghai Fashion Week, Joffrey Ballet and Gucci Archive.

Her 2024 debut with Platoon (Apple Inc) charted at No. 7 on UK Album Chart (Classical) and No. 15 on ARIA Charts (Classical).

== Discography ==
=== Solo recordings ===
- Listen, London: First Impression (2014)
- Mediterranean Sounds (2016)
- Mademoiselle (2017)
- Departure (2019)
- Destinations (2020)
- Late Night Sessions: At Home (2020, Eito Music)
- Late Night Sessions: The Storyteller (2021, Eito Music)
- Late Night Sessions: New Dawn (2021, Eito Music)
- The Stone Nest Live Session (2021, Eito Music)
- "Ravel In The Forest" (2024, Platoon)
