= DEADLETTER =

English post-punk band

Background information
- Origin: South London, England; Yorkshire, England
- Genres: Post-punk; Art punk; Alternative rock
- Works: Singles; Live performances
- Years active: 2020–present
- Labels: Nice Swan Records; Make-A-Dance; So Recordings
- Members: Zac Lawrence; Alfie Husband; George Ullyott; Will King; Nathan Pigott; Sam Jones

DEADLETTER is a British post‑punk and art‑punk band formed in South London with roots in Yorkshire. The group is known for its politically charged lyrics, saxophone‑driven arrangements, and energetic live performances. Their music blends groove‑driven rhythms with abrasive post‑punk textures, earning them recognition within the UK's post‑punk revival.

== History ==
DEADLETTER was formed in early 2020 by vocalist Zac Lawrence, drummer Alfie Husband, bassist George Ullyott, and guitarist Will King. The founding members previously collaborated as teenagers in the Yorkshire punk act Mice on Mars before relocating to London in 2017.

Their debut single, "Good Old Days," was released in May 2020. In 2022, the band released “Pop Culture Connoisseur” They later signed with So Recordings and released their EP Heat! in November 2022, promoted with a tour supporting Placebo. Saxophonist Poppy Richler joined shortly before the EP’s recording, while guitarist Sam Jones replaced James Bates.

In 2022 and 2023 the band received support from BBC Introducing, appearing at showcases including at The Hundred (cricket) tournament.

They performed a live session at Maida Vale for Steve Lamacq, showcasing tracks from their debut album Hysterical Strength during a BBC Radio 6 Music broadcast on 16 September 2024.

Hysterical Strength was released in 2024. The band toured extensively across Europe and the UK following its release.

In 2026, DEADLETTER released their second album, Existence Is Bliss, which explores existentialist themes and marks a shift toward more spacious, contemplative songwriting. Clash magazine praised the album as “a creative evolution” that presents “an evolved, multi-layered sound” exploring what it means to live meaningfully in a tumultuous world.

== Musical style ==
DEADLETTER’s early sound was described as incorporating elements of post‑punk, art‑punk, and alternative rock. Critics describe their music as sardonic, moody, groove‑driven, and politically charged, characterised by angular guitar work, rhythmic basslines, and prominent saxophone lines.

In a 2026 interview with Clash, the band stated that their second album Existence Is Bliss was designed to “explore the increasingly relatable anxieties of simply being alive,” with vocalist Zac Lawrence noting that the record offers “room to breathe” compared to their earlier, more frenetic material.

This evolution has been highlighted by reviewers who note the band’s shift toward more spacious arrangements and multi‑layered instrumentation, while retaining the abrasive, politically charged edge that defined their early singles.

Their live performances are frequently noted for their intensity, with Lawrence’s physical stage presence drawing comparisons to Mick Jagger.

== Discography ==
=== Studio albums ===
- Hysterical Strength (2024)
- Existence Is Bliss (2026)

=== EPs ===
- Heat! (2022)

=== Selected singles ===
- “Good Old Days” (2020)
- “Fit for Work” (2020)
- “Fall of the Big Screen” (2021)
- “Monday Night Terrors” (2021)
- “Pop Culture Connoisseur” (2022)
- “Line the Cows” (2022)
- “The Snitching Hour” (2023)
- “Degenerate Inanimate” (2023)
- “Mere Mortal” (2024)
