= Tsunaina =

British–Nepali singer-songwriter

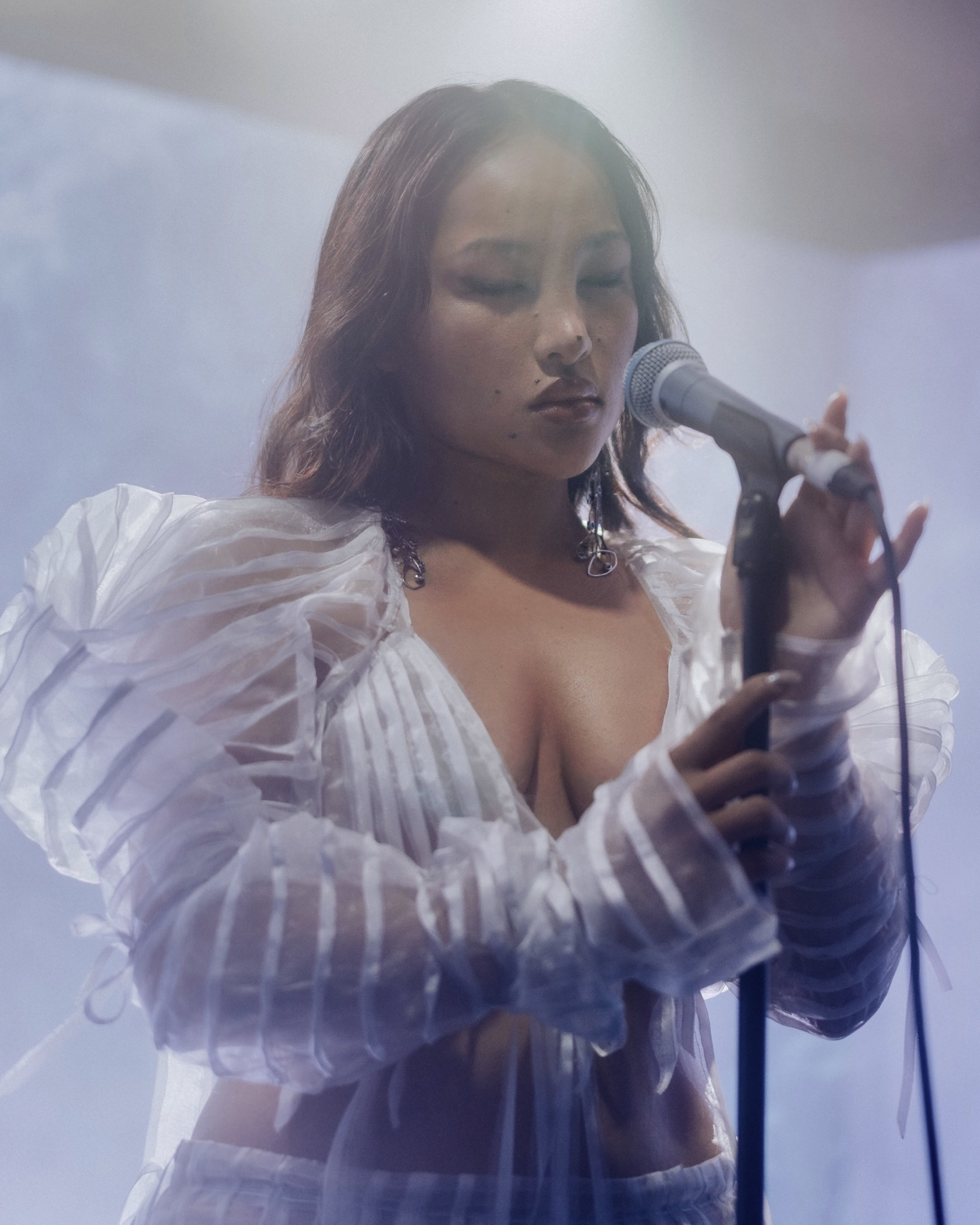
- Tsunaina performing live in London 2023
- Born: Kowloon, Hong Kong
- Education: SOAS, University of the Arts London
- Occupations: Singer-songwriter; Model
- Years active: 2017–present
- Website: tsunaina.com

Tsunaina (Nepali pronunciation: [(t)suːˈnʌɪːna]) (Note: Nepali: सुनयना लिम्बु from Sanskrit: सुनयन) is a British–Nepali singer-songwriter, visual artist, and fashion model. She is known for her distinctive facial features, visual style and music. In 2020, she released her debut single "Waterways", followed by "UnEarth", "Fanned Out Fingers" and "A Dam on the Eve of Breaking". Tsunaina has also created music for Iris van Herpen, McQ, and Robert Wun.

== Early life ==
Tsunaina was born in Kowloon. Tsunaina also has a younger brother. She grew up in Lalitpur, Nepal, and spent her childhood there until moving to Kent, England, to join her family. At age 18, Tsunaina moved to London.

Tsunaina was raised by her mother who is a Limbu, Yakthung (ᤕᤠᤰᤌᤢᤱ), a Tibeto-Burman indigenous tribe of the Himalayan region of eastern Nepal, Sikkim, and western Bhutan. She is fluent in Nepali, English, and Hindi.

== Career ==
After being scouted for modelling, Tsunaina initially gained recognition for her visual storytelling on Instagram and as the muse of Pat McGrath. After gracing the cover of Harper's Bazaar Kazakhstan she went on to be shot by Paolo Roversi, Tim Walker, Zhong Lin, and Frank Lebon. Tsunaina has also appeared in British Vogue, Vogue Italia, W Magazine, Dazed, I-D, Paper Magazine, System, and Numero France.

In 2020 she released her debut single "Waterways". Followed by "UnEarth", "A Dam on the Eve of Breaking", and in 2021, she released "Fanned Out Fingers". co-composed and co-produced by Bon Music Vision

Tsunaina has created music for Iris van Herpen Haute couture FW21 "Earthrise", McQ 2021 "Breathe", and Robert Wun Haute couture SS23 "Fear"; she also performed live to open for London designer, Asai Tai, SS23 during London Fashion Week.

Tsunaina cites Bollywood and her homeland as influences, Tsunaina's earliest musical memory is singing “Ajeeb dastan hei ye” with her cousin.

In 2021 I-D named Tsunaina as one of the "12 new musicians making the UK sound awesome".
