= Jeshi =

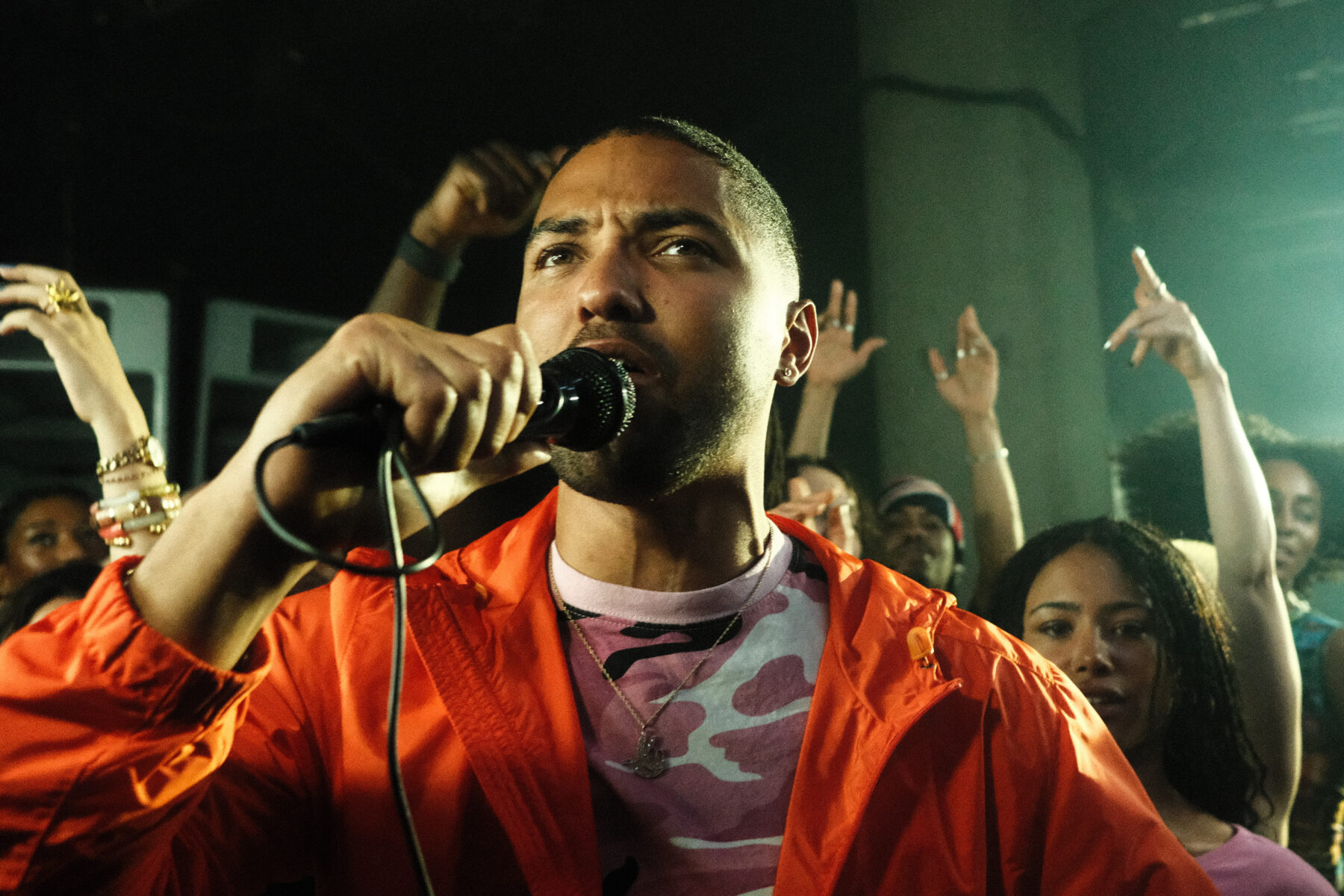

Background information
- Born: Jesse Greenway; Walthamstow, London
- Genres: Hip hop; electronic
- Occupations: Rapper; record producer; songwriter
- Years active: 2016–present
- Labels: Select Discs, Because Music

Jesse Greenway, known by the stage name Jeshi, is a musical artist based in London. His music predominantly covers working class disenfranchisement under austerity in Britain through personal storytelling and powerful social commentary.

== Personal life ==
Jeshi was born to a working-class family in Walthamstow, East London. He was raised predominantly by his mother and grandmother, describing his father as "absent", something shared by many of those around him. Despite not having a particularly musical upbringing, he recounted spending "hours glued to the TV watching MTV" and Channel U (UK). He has depicted his influences as broad, ranging from The Streets and Dizzee Rascal to Toro y Moi as well as trip hop bands such as Massive Attack and Portishead. In a discussion with Don Letts for The Face, Jeshi described experiencing Stop and Search growing up. He has also stated that he was physically assaulted in front of his family at the age of 15; he describes undergoing this experience, and choosing not to retaliate afterward, as a pivotal moment in his life.

== Career ==
Jeshi released his debut studio album, Universal Credit, in May 2022. The album's title refers to the British benefits system, which Jeshi utilizsed while writing the record; the cover art depicts him holding a benefit cheque for £324.84. The album received critical acclaim for its social commentary on contemporary British life, ranging from the cost-of-living crisis to mental health. In late 2022, the music video for the track "3210" won Best Independent Video at the AIM Independent Music Awards.

In January 2025, Jeshi released his second studio album, Airbag Woke Me Up, via Because Music. The album was inspired by a 2016 car accident and featured collaborations with Sainté, Louis Culture, and Fredwave. Reviewers noted a broadening of his sound, with Jeshi stating that the project utilised his voice in a more versatile manner than his debut.

In early 2026, Jeshi shifted toward a more electronic and club-oriented sound with the release of the single "champagne". A collaboration with Fredwave and Berlin-based producer Big Ever, the track was released via Select Discs, a dance-focused imprint of Partisan Records. Jeshi described the single's high-energy production as being inspired by the atmosphere of regional British club culture and "pure chaos."

In October 2026, he released a new mixtape called Headrush under Select Discs, a club-focused imprint of Partisan Records.

== Discography ==
=== Studio albums ===
- Universal Credit (2022)
- Airbag Woke Me Up (2025)
- Headrush (2026)

=== EPs ===
- Pussy Palace (2016)
- The Worlds Spinning Too Fast (2017)
- Bad Taste (2020)
- The Great Stink (2023)

=== Singles ===
- "champagne" (2026)
