= Hak Baker =

British singer and rapper (born 1991)

Hak Baker (born 1991) is a British singer and rapper from London.

== Early life ==
Hak Baker was born in Luton to a Grenadian father and Jamaican mother, the fifth of nine children. Since the age of one he has lived on the Isle of Dogs. As a child, he was a choirboy at Southwark Cathedral. Aged 14, he joined the grime group Bomb Squad. He dropped out of school aged 15. In his mid 20s he spent two years in jail for robbery.

== History ==
Baker performed musical collaborations with the Streets. In 2022, he performed at Glastonbury festival.

In 2024, he played at Boomtown Festival and Reading and Leeds Festival. As part of the Summer Series in July, he also performed to a packed crowd at Somerset House in London.

=== Worlds End FM ===
In 2023 Baker recorded his first album, Worlds End FM. NME featured the album in their lineup of the "10 best debut albums released in 2023," praising it for introducing Baker as a "21st Century troubadour speaking to modern problems with empathy and requisite anger”.

== Style ==
Baker's musical style is influenced by grime music, reggae and punk rock. In addition to his singing and rapping talents, he is a skilled guitarist.

== Discography ==
=== Babylon (2020) ===
- 1. Big House
- 2. Lad
- 3. Broomstick
- 4. Mush
- 5. Venezuela Riddim
- 6. PC Plod
- 7. Babylon
- 8. SKINT
- 9. Grief Eyes
- 10. Fuck You
- 11. Embargo
- 12. Thirsty Thursday (Bonus Track)

=== Misled (2021) ===
- 1. Cool Kids
- 2. Stay Alive
- 3. Cop Car
- 4. Irrelevant Elephant
- 5. Young Again
- 6. Borrowed Time

=== Worlds End FM (2023) ===
- 1. World's End FM (Intro)
- 2. DOOLALLY
- 3. Windrush Baby
- 4. Collateral Cause
- 5. Bricks In The Wall
- 6. Full On
- 7. Babylon Must Fall (MC Grindah Skit)
- 8. I Don't Know
- 9. Run
- 10. Telephones 4 Eyes
- 11. Watford's Burning (Connie Constance Skit)
- 12. Brotherhood
- 13. Luv u Bro (Big Zees Skit)
- 14. Dying to Live
- 15. Almost Lost London
- 16. The End of the World

=== Nostalgia Death Act 1 EP (2024) ===
- 1. Nameless
- 2. Boys X Girls
- 3. Everybody's Dyin’
- 4. Luvly

== Awards and nominations ==
Award Ceremony	Year	Nominee/Work	Category	Result
Berlin Music Video Awards	2024	Telephone 4 Eyes	Best Experimentral	Nominated

== Personal life ==
Baker supports left-wing political causes. He has criticised the gentrification of working class areas by yuppies and middle class hipster subculture. He also opposes the Tories' attempts to deport refugees to Rwanda, and has compared it to the discrimination faced by the Windrush generation.
