= Amazon Music Live =

- Genre: Concert
- Country of origin: United States
- Original language: English
- No. of seasons: 4
- No. of episodes: 16

Original release
- Network: Prime Video; Twitch
- Release: October 27, 2022 – present

Amazon Music Live is a weekly livestreamed concert series hosted by rapper 2 Chainz. It premiered on October 27, 2022, on Prime Video and the Amazon Music channel on Twitch. The second season premiered on September 21, 2023. The third season premiered on October 17, 2024. The fourth season premiered on October 23, 2025.

== History ==
On October 17, 2022, it was announced that Amazon would be introducing Amazon Music Live, a new weekly livestreamed concert series streaming on Prime Video and Twitch immediately after Thursday Night Football. The performances are also available on demand for a limited time. The series is hosted by 2 Chainz, who introduces each artist and interviews them during the show.

The series premiered on October 27, 2022, with Lil Baby performing songs from his album It's Only Me. Other season one performers include Megan Thee Stallion, Kane Brown, Lil Wayne, Anuel AA, A$AP Rocky, Anitta and 21 Savage. Lil Wayne performed on November 17, 2022, and 2 Chainz performed with him for that show, on songs "Rich As Fuck" and "Duffle Bag Boy". 21 Savage performed songs from Her Loss, his collaborative album with Drake, on the season one finale on December 29, 2022. Each concert is filmed in front of a live audience at Red Studios Hollywood.

The second season, again hosted by 2 Chainz, premiered on September 21, 2023, with a performance by Ed Sheeran. The Amazon Music Live pre-show broadcast was hosted by Gia Peppers and Christian Crosby. The second season also includes performances by Feid, Lil Durk, Metro Boomin, Peso Pluma, Green Day, and Latto.

The third season premiered on October 17, 2024, following Thursday Night Football. The seven-episode season began with a live performance from Jelly Roll, with his set including songs from his upcoming album Beautifully Broken. On October 8, 2024, it was announced that Big Sean (performing alongside North Carolina A&T State University's Blue and Gold Marching Machine and Fellowship Gospel Choir), Halsey and J Balvin, would also perform in season 3. On October 30, it was announced that Gunna and Twice will also perform. The season finale took place after the Black Friday football game on November 29, 2024 where Snoop Dogg performed.

On October 16, 2025, Season 4 was announced and it premiered exactly one week later. The performers announced were Shaboozey, Foo Fighters, Fuerza Regida and Aespa

On September 9th, 2026, Season 5 Was Announced that the series will be "On the Road" with performances by Noah Kahan at T-Mobile Park in Seattle, Don Toliver at the Barclays Center in Brooklyn, Lainey Wilson at the Mohegan Sun Arena in Uncasville (Nearby Hartford, Connecticut), and Doja Cat at the Kia Forum in Los Angeles

== Performances ==
=== Season 1 ===
Date	Artist
October 27, 2022	Lil Baby
November 3, 2022	Megan Thee Stallion
November 10, 2022	Kane Brown
November 17, 2022	Lil Wayne (with special guests 2 Chainz and Gudda Gudda)
December 1, 2022	Anuel AA
December 8, 2022	A$AP Rocky (with special guests $not, Thottwat and 2 Chainz)
December 15, 2022	Anitta
December 29, 2022	21 Savage

=== Season 2 ===
Date	Artist
September 21, 2023	Ed Sheeran
September 28, 2023	Feid
October 5, 2023	Lil Durk (with special guests Trippie Redd, Chief Wuk and Machine Gun Kelly)
October 12, 2023	Metro Boomin (with special guests NAV, Offset and Post Malone)
October 19, 2023	Peso Pluma
October 26, 2023	Green Day
November 2, 2023	Latto (with special guests Glorilla and 2 Chainz)

=== Season 3 ===
Date	Artist
October 17, 2024	Jelly Roll (with special guests Machine Gun Kelly, Keith Urban and Skylar Grey
October 24, 2024	Big Sean (with special guests YG, Jhene Aiko, and E-40)
October 31, 2024	Halsey
November 7, 2024	J Balvin
November 14, 2024	Gunna
November 21, 2024	Twice
November 29, 2024	Snoop Dogg (with special guest Tha Dogg Pound)

=== Season 4 ===
Date	Artist
October 23, 2025	Shaboozey (with special guest Kevin Powers)
October 30, 2025	Foo Fighters
November 6, 2025	Fuerza Regida
November 13, 2025	Aespa

=== Season 5 ===
Date	Artist
September 24, 2026	Noah Kahan
October 1, 2026	Don Toliver (With special guests Teezo Touchdown, Cash Cobain, Victony, Busta Rhymes, Sexyy Red and Cardi B)
October 15, 2026	Lainey Wilson
October 29, 2026	Doja Cat (With special guests Latto and Rico Nasty)

== Garth Brooks: Dive Bar Concert ==
On November 2, 2023, it was announced that Garth Brooks would headline the first Black Friday Amazon Music Live concert special, which would be livestreamed on Prime Video and Twitch on November 24, 2023, following the inaugural Black Friday NFL game. The concert took place at Brooks' new bar, Friends in Low Places Bar & Honky-Tonk in Nashville, Tennessee. The 55-minute set included appearances from Ronnie Dunn on "Rodeo Man", and Trisha Yearwood on a cover of "Shallow" from A Star is Born, and on Yearwood's "She's in Love with the Boy". The pre-show was hosted on Twitch by Kelly Sutton and Amber Anderson.
