= Mette Towley =

American dancer and actress (born 1991)

Mette
- Born: May 31, 1991 (age 35); Owatonna, Minnesota, U.S.
- Education: University of Minnesota College of Liberal Arts
- Occupations: Dancer, actress, singer

Mette Towley (born May 31, 1991), known professionally as Mette (stylized in all caps) or Mette Narrative, is an American dancer, actress, and singer.

== Early life and education ==
Towley was born in Owatonna, Minnesota, and raised in Severn, Maryland, and Alexandria, Minnesota. Towley has a white father and a black mother, and self-identifies as mixed race. Her father is an engineer and her mother is an accountant. She was introduced to dance at age five at Baltimore School for the Arts student recitals.

She graduated from Jefferson Senior High School of Alexandria, Minnesota in 2009 and earned a degree in dance from the College of Liberal Arts at the University of Minnesota.

== Career ==
Towley's breakthrough role was as the dancer in the music video for Lemon by N.E.R.D. and Rihanna. Towley performed in the 2019 films Hustlers, and in Cats in the role of Cassandra.

Towley has appeared on The Ellen DeGeneres Show. She performed in the 2020 superhero movie The Old Guard in the minor role of Jordan, Nile's friend in the Marines. In 2021 she released the song and music video Petrified. She appeared as Barbie Video Girl in the 2023 Barbie film adaptation. In November 2023, she opened for Jessie Ware's UK tour after her first headline shows in London, New York and Los Angeles, and opened The Fashion Awards at The Royal Albert Hall.

On 11 January 2024, Towley released the single "Darling Drive" with Scottish producer Sam Gellaitry, a song inspired by the street she grew up on in Minnesota.

In May 2024, Taylor Swift announced on social media that Towley was one of three artists who were opening for the London shows of the Eras Tour alongside Paramore, Towley's being the June 21 show, with Griff and Benson Boone opening for the June 22 & June 23 shows respectively. Additionally, her work "Mama's Eyes" was nominated for the Best Contemporary Song Ivor Novello Award.

Towley's song Mama's Eyes was featured in the Feels Like Gap campaign for fashion company GAP.

== Personal life ==
Towley currently resides in Los Angeles.

== Filmography ==
Year	Title	Role	Notes
2019	Hustlers	Justice	
2019	Cats	Cassandra	Motion capture performance
2020	The Old Guard	Jordan	
2023	Barbie	Barbie Video Girl	

== Discography ==
Studio Albums

Title	Details	Peak chart positions
COMING OF AGE	Released: 9 October 2026; Label: Grand Darling Corp.; Track listing: 1. "SMALL WORLD"; 2. "COMING OF AGE"; 3. "THE MOVEMENT"; 4. "FAMILY TIES"; 5. "TANGERINE SKY"; 6. "SAUVIGNON"; 7. "HOLLYWOOD FOREVER"; 8. "BOIL THE OCEAN"; 9. "MULTIPLY"; 10. "SELF PORTRAIT"	—

Extended plays

Title	Details	Peak chart positions
METTENARRATIVE	Released: 22 September 2023; Label: Grand Darling Corp., RCA; Track listing: 1. "METTE INTRO"; 2. "FOR THE PEOPLE"; 3. "VAN GOGH"; 4. "CHOCOLATE CITY"; 5. "PSYCHO (NAH NAH)"; 6. "ACID RAIN"; 7. "MAMA'S EYES"	—

Singles

Year	Single	Album/EP
2021	"Petrified"	Non-album single
2023	"MAMA'S EYES"	METTENARRATIVE
2023	"VAN GOGH"	METTENARRATIVE
2023	"FOR THE PEOPLE"	METTENARRATIVE
2024	"DARLING DRIVE"	Non-album singles
2024	"BET"	Non-album singles
2024	"Bennie and the Jets (Amazon Music Original)"	Non-album singles
2024	"MUSCLE"	Non-album singles
2026	"ANXIOUS TO LOVE YOU"	Non-album singles
2026	"COMING OF AGE"	COMING OF AGE
2026	"BOIL THE OCEAN"	COMING OF AGE
2026	"SMALL WORLD"	COMING OF AGE
2026	"THE MOVEMENT"	COMING OF AGE
