= Fridayy discography =

R&B recording artist discography

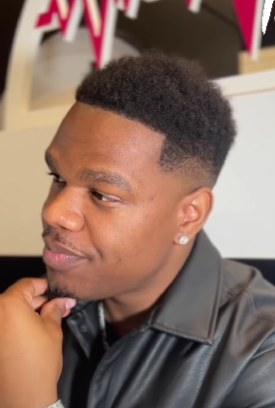
- Fridayy in 2023
- Studio albums: 3
- EPs: 1
- Singles: 6

The discography of Haitian-American singer Fridayy consists of three studio albums, one extended play, and six singles.

== Albums ==
Album, with selected details
| Title | Album details | Peak chart positions |
| Title | Album details | US |
|---|---|---|
| Fridayy | Released: August 25, 2023; Label: Def Jam, Lost in Melody; Format: Digital download, streaming | — |
| Some Days I'm Good, Some Days I'm Not | Released: February 28, 2025; Label: Def Jam, Lost in Melody; Format: Digital download, streaming | 51 |
| Tension | Released: August 14, 2026; Label: Def Jam, Lost in Melody; Format: Digital download, streaming | — |

== Extended plays ==
Extended play, with selected details
| Title | EP details |
|---|---|
| Lost in Melody | Released: October 21, 2022; Format: Digital download, streaming; Label: Def Jam, Lost in Melody |

== Singles ==
=== As lead artist ===
List of singles, with selected chart positions
| Title | Year | Peak chart positions | | Certifications | Album |
| Title | Year | US | US R&B/HH | Certifications | Album |
|---|---|---|---|---|---|
| "Don't Give Up On Me" | 2022 | — | — | | Lost in Melody |
| "Don't Give It Away" (with Chris Brown) | 2023 | — | — | | Fridayy |
| "When It Comes to You" | 2023 | 97 | 29 | RIAA: Platinum | Fridayy |
| "Without You" | 2024 | — | — | | Some Days I'm Good, Some Days I'm Not |
| "Baddest in the Room" | 2024 | — | — | RIAA: Gold | Some Days I'm Good, Some Days I'm Not |
| "Back to You" | 2024 | — | — | | Some Days I'm Good, Some Days I'm Not |
| "Death Do Us Part" (with Mariah the Scientist) | 2025 | — | 43 | | Everybody Got Somebody |

=== Featured singles ===
List of featured singles
| Title | Year | Album |
|---|---|---|
| "Move Like That" (Musikspirit featuring William Aston & Fridayy) | 2022 | The Crew, Vol. 1 |
| "See the Light" (Swedish House Mafia featuring Fridayy) | 2023 | Non-album single |
| "Fuchsia" (Oranj Goodman featuring Fridayy & Bigallstar) | 2023 | Juice |
| "I Pray" (Leo featuring Fridayy) | 2024 | Find My Way |
| "Get Back Up" (Pressa featuring Fridayy) | 2024 | Non-album single |
| "You Can Make It" (Will Smith featuring Fridayy and Sunday Service Choir) | 2024 | Dance in Your Darkest Moments |
| "Slow Down" (KitschKreig featuring Future, Fridayy & Mariah the Scientist) | 2024 | German Engineering Zwei |
| "Complicated" (DJ Snake featuring Fridayy) | 2024 | TBA |
| "Malaika (Remix)" (Teni featuring Fridayy) | 2024 | TBA |

== Other charted songs ==
List of other charted songs, with selected chart positions
| Title | Year | Peak chart positions | | | | | | Certifications | Album |
| Title | Year | US | US R&B/HH | US Rap | CAN | UK | WW | Certifications | Album |
|---|---|---|---|---|---|---|---|---|---|
| "God Did" (DJ Khaled featuring Rick Ross, Lil Wayne, Jay-Z, John Legend, and Fridayy) | 2022 | 17 | 6 | 3 | 29 | 50 | 24 | RIAA: Gold | God Did |
| "Forever" (Lil Baby featuring Fridayy) | 2022 | 8 | 3 | 2 | 61 | 43 | 23 | RIAA: Platinum | It's Only Me |
| "Proud of Me" (with Meek Mill) | 2025 | 87 | 26 | 16 | — | — | — | RIAA: Gold | Some Days I'm Good, Some Days I'm Not |

== Guest appearances ==
List of non-single guest appearances, with other performing artists
| Title | Year | Other artist(s) | Album |
|---|---|---|---|
| "Running to You" | 2020 | Road to Restoration, Kid Travis | Running to You |
| "God Did" | 2022 | DJ Khaled, Rick Ross, Lil Wayne, Jay-Z, John Legend | God Did |
| "Sacrifices" | 2022 | Symba, DJ Drama | Results Take Time |
| "Forever" | 2022 | Lil Baby | It's Only Me |
| "Thank You Lord" | 2023 | Lil Keed | Keed Talk to 'Em 2 |
| "Will Not Lose" | 2023 | NLE Choppa | Cottonwood 2 |
| "Proud of Me" | 2023 | Armani White | Road to Casablanco |
| "Lies" | 2023 | Moneybagg Yo | Hard to Love |
| "Countin' On You" | 2023 | Lil Tjay, Khi Infinite | Fast X (soundtrack) |
| "What It Do" | 2023 | Zae France | Rhythm n Backwoods Szn II - EP |
| "Room Comfort" | 2023 | Rylo Rodriguez, Lil Durk | Been One |
| "No One Else" | 2023 | Chris Brown | 11:11 |
| "Wet" | 2023 | Masicka | Generation of Kings |
| "Ahead of My Time" | 2023 | Baraka the Kid, Dinoviek, 1Navo | Ahead of My Time |
| "Don't Break My Heart Pt 1" | 2023 | Baraka the Kid, MK Beats, Vory | Ahead of My Time |
| "Losing My Mind" | 2023 | Baraka the Kid, Dinoviek, MK Beats, 1Navo, Vory | Ahead of My Time |
| "Don't Break My Heart Pt 2" | 2023 | Baraka the Kid, MK Beats, Vory | Ahead of My Time |
| "We Can't Forget Him (Remix)" | 2024 | Bobbi Sotrm, DreamDoll | —N/a |
| "Live Forever" | 2024 | Yung Bleu | Jeremy |
| "Lost it All" | 2024 | Mozzy | Children of the Slums |
| "Friday" | 2024 | The Chainsmokers | No Hard Feelings |
| "Need You Around" | 2024 | A Boogie wit da Hoodie | Better Off Alone |
| "Paranoid" | 2024 | King Promise | True to Self |
| "Soul to Keep" | 2024 | Headie One | The Last One |
| "Same Me" | 2024 | Polo G | Hood Poet |
| "I Know" | 2024 | Tee Grizzley | Post Traumatic |
| "Queen of Memphis" | 2024 | GloRilla | Glorious |
| "Pretty Girlz" | 2024 | KitschKreig, J.I the Prince of N.Y | German Engineering Zwei |
| "Too Fast" | 2024 | KitschKreig, Mariah the Scientist | German Engineering Zwei |

== Production discography ==
=== 2022 ===
Rae Sremmurd

- "Denial" (produced with Fortune, Bizness Boi and Kofo)

Chris Brown – Breezy

- 1. "Till the Wheels Fall Off" (featuring Lil Durk and Capella Grey) (produced with RoccStar, Kifano Reque and Yacoub Kawaja)

Wiz Khalifa – Multiverse

- 4. "1000 Women" (featuring They) (produced with Hitmaka and Jae Roc)

DJ Khaled – God Did

- 2. "God Did" (featuring Rick Ross, Lil Wayne, Jay-Z, John Legend and Fridayy) (produced with DJ Khaled, StreetRunner, and Tarik Azzouz)

Lil Tjay

- "Give You What You Want" (produced with Mike Wavvs, Jack LoMastro and TobiTurnUp)

Lil Baby – It's Only Me

- 8. "Forever" (featuring Fridayy) (produced with Fortune and Bizness Boi)
- 9. "Blessings (Remix)" (featuring Asake)

Fridayy – Lost in Melody

- 1. "Blessings" (produced with Chris Washington and Edgar Cutino)
- 2. "Empty Stomach" (produced with Chris Washington, Edgar Cutino, Blvck and Dinuzzo)
- 3. "God Sent" (featuring Vory) (produced with Chris Washington, Edgar Cutino and Dylan Graham)
- 4. "Dont Give Up on Me" (produced with Chris Washington and Edgar Cutino)
- 5. "Know the Truth" (produced with Chris Washington, Edgar Cutino, Gabriel Lambirth, Patrick Collier and Mombru)
- 6. "Come Through" (produced with Chris Washington, Edgar Cutino, Tom Levesque, Danes Blood and Ben10k)
- 7. "Momma" (produced with Chris Washington and Edgar Cutino)

Fridayy – Fridayy

- 7. "Don't Give It Away" (produced with Aidan Brody and KVRIM)

Rod Wave – Jupiter's Diary: 7 Day Theory

- 3. "The Answer is No" (produced with Haze and TnTXD)

=== 2023 ===
Coco Jones – What I Didn't Tell You (Deluxe)

- 10. "Put You On" (produced with Elliot and Fortune)

Tink – Thanks 4 Nothing

- 8. "Trust Issues" (produced with Hitmaka and Skipondabeat)

EST Gee – El Toro 2

- 6. "The Biggest" (produced with John Gotitt, Angie Randisi and Reapyy)

Chris Brown – 11:11

- 7. "No One Else" (featuring Fridayy) (produced with RoccStar, Fortune and GABE)

2 Chainz and Lil Wayne – Welcome 2 Collegrove

- 9. "Transparency" (featuring Usher) (produced with Hitmaka, Mike Dean, Paul Cabbin and Tarik Beats)

=== 2024 ===
Clavish – Chapter 16

- 7. "Take You There" (produced with Dinuzzo)

Chris Brown – 11:11 (Deluxe)

- 3. "No Interruptions" (produced with Bizness Boi, Fortune, Kofo)

Chlöe – Trouble in Paradise

- 1. "All I Got (Free Falling)" (produced with Bizness Boi, BongoByTheWay, Johan Lenox and Oh Gosh Leotus)

OG Parker – Moments

- 4. "All I Need" (featuring Yung Bleu) (produced with OG Parker)
