= Welcome 2 Collegrove =

Studio album by 2 Chainz and Lil Wayne
- Released: November 17, 2023
- Recorded: 2016–2023
- Genres: Hip-hop; Southern hip-hop
- Length: 57:38
- Labels: Gamebread; Def Jam
- Producers: 30 Roc; Apex Martin; B Ham; Bangladesh; Big K.R.I.T.; Big Papito; Dem Jointz; DJ Toomp; Fridayy; Havoc; Hitmaka; Honorable C.N.O.T.E.; Indyah; Jordan Fox; Juicy J; Kreative Villains; London Jae; Loopholes; Mannie Fresh; MarcLo; Mark Byrd; Mighty Max; Mike Dean; Mondo; Murda Beatz; Nolan Presley; Paul Cabbin; Streetrunner; Tarik Beats

2 Chainz and Lil Wayne chronology
ColleGrove (2016)	Welcome 2 Collegrove (2023)

2 Chainz chronology
Dope Don't Sell Itself (2022)	Welcome 2 Collegrove (2023)	Life Is Beautiful (2025)

Lil Wayne chronology
Tha Fix Before Tha VI (2023)	Welcome 2 Collegrove (2023)	Tha Carter VI (2025)

Singles from Welcome 2 Collegrove
- 1. "Presha" Released: October 20, 2023; 2. "Long Story Short" Released: November 10, 2023; 3. "Transparency" Released: November 17, 2023

Professional ratings
Review scores
Source	Rating
AllMusic	3.5/5 stars
American Songwriter	3.5/5 stars
HipHopDX	3.9/5 stars
Slant	2.5/5 stars
Pitchfork	5.8/10

Welcome 2 Collegrove is a collaborative studio album by American rappers 2 Chainz and Lil Wayne. It was released on November 17, 2023, through Def Jam Recordings. It is the sequel to 2 Chainz' third studio album ColleGrove (2016), which was originally planned to be a Lil Wayne collaboration album; although he could not be co-credited due to label issues. It features guest appearances from 21 Savage, Usher, Fabolous, Benny the Butcher, Vory, Rick Ross and Marsha Ambrosius.

It is also 2 Chainz's final album to be released under Def Jam, as he parted ways with the label the following year.

== Background and promotion ==
The title is a portmanteau of 2 Chainz' and Lil Wayne's hometowns. 2 Chainz is from College Park, Georgia, while Wayne hails from Hollygrove, New Orleans. The release was led by the single "Presha", released on October 20, 2023 and produced by Bangladesh. The album was originally set to release on the same day as Nicki Minaj's Pink Friday 2; however, Minaj later pushed that album's release date further back to December 8, so her vinyl preorders would be shipped in the first week. The album was originally believed to be released on November 2, 2023 but Wayne said that was "not tru[e]".

On October 27, during an episode of Young Money Radio on Apple Music, the pair debuted two new songs in "Long Story Short" and "Oprah and Gayle"; both are confirmed to appear on the album. The second single from the album, "Long Story Short", was released November 10. The third single from the album, "Transparency" was released November 17.

== Composition ==
Welcome 2 Collegrove is a hip hop and Southern hip hop album. According to AllMusic's TiVo Staff "Narrative skits and quick shifts in production styles give the album a mixtape feel". Thomas Galindo of American Songwriter said that in comparison to their previous collaborative album, on Welcome 2 Collegrove Lil Wayne and 2 Chainz "opted for more of a mixed bag of approaches".

== Commercial performance ==
In the United States, Welcome 2 Collegrove debuted at number 20 on the US Billboard 200 with 34,000 album-equivalent units.

== Track listing ==
Welcome 2 Collegrove track listing
No.	Title	Writer(s)	Producer(s)	Length
1.	"Scene 1: Welcome 2 Collegrove"	Dwayne Abernathy Jr.	Dem Jointz	0:49
2.	"G6"	Dwayne Carter; Tauheed Epps; Javier Rockamore; Roman Boris Rondiak; Papa Abdou Fall; Nolan Presley; Theodore Thomas	Big Papito; London Jae; Loopholes; Presley	3:04
3.	"Big Diamonds" (featuring 21 Savage)	Carter; Epps; Sheyaa Abraham-Joseph; Byron Thomas; Bryan Williams	Mannie Fresh	3:19
4.	"Presha"	Carter; Epps; Shondrae Crawford; Curtis Jackson; Andre Young; Mike Elizondo	Bangladesh	3:05
5.	"Long Story Short"	Carter; Epps; B. Thomas; Justin Scott; Jordan Michael Houston; Anna Gaye; Elgie Stover; Iris Gordy; Paul Beauregard; Patrick Houston; Marvin Gaye	Mannie Fresh; Big K.R.I.T.; Juicy J	3:30
6.	"Scene 2: Duffle Bag Boys"	Abernathy	Dem Jointz	0:29
7.	"Millions from Now"	Carter; Epps; Mike Dean; Asten Harris	Dean; Apex Martin	2:19
8.	"Crazy Thick"	Carter; Epps; Brandon Hamlin; Marcus Lomax	B Ham; MarcLo; German^{[a]}	2:56
9.	"Transparency" (featuring Usher)	Carter; Epps; Christian Ward; Dean; Lerron Carson; Francis LeBlanc; Altariq Crapps; Melvin Moore	Fridayy; Hitmaka; Dean; Paul Cabbin; Tarik Beats	3:15
10.	"Significant Other"	Carter; Epps; Samuel Gloade; Carlton Davis Mays Jr.; Marcus Byrd; Darius Jenkins; Corey Eborn; Eric Sloan; Indyah Mcalister; Brandon Black	30 Roc; Honorable C.N.O.T.E.; Indyah; Kreative Villains; Mark Byrd	4:23
11.	"Scene 3: Ladies Man"	Abernathy	Dem Jointz	0:31
12.	"PPA" (featuring Fabolous)	Carter; Epps; Chris Mendoza; John Jackson; Byrd; Vince Mendoza	Mark Byrd	3:40
13.	"Oprah and Gayle" (featuring Benny the Butcher)	Carter; Epps; Aldrin Davis; Angela Bofill; Jeremie Pennick	DJ Toomp	5:13
14.	"Shame"	Carter; Epps; Big John Hamilton; Lamont Hawkins; Clifford Smith; Corey Woods; Dennis Coles; Gary Grice; Jason Hunter; Kejuan Muchita; Melvin Mims; Robert Diggs; Russell Jones	Havoc	2:36
15.	"Bars"	Carter; Epps; Charles Lloyd; Chris Patilis; C. Jackson; Curtis Stewart; David Brown; Kal Dellaportas; Muchita; Marvin Bernard; Dean	Havoc; Mike Dean	3:42
16.	"Scene 4: No Fent"	Abernathy	Dem Jointz	0:28
17.	"Godzilla" (featuring Vory)	Carter; Epps; Armond Kendrick; Dominick Lopez; Tavoris Hollins Jr.	Mondo; DomSolo^{[a]}	3:02
18.	"Crown Snatcher"	Carter; Epps; Jordan Fox; Shane Lindstrom	Fox; Murda Beatz	2:36
19.	"Can't Believe You" (featuring Rick Ross)	Carter; Epps; Maxime Berton; Nicholas Warwar; Tarik Azzouz; William Roberts	StreetRunner; Azzouz; MightyMax	4:39
20.	"Scene 5: Never Was Lost"	Abernathy	Dem Jointz	0:14
21.	"Moonlight" (featuring Marsha Ambrosius)	Carter; Epps; Abernathy; Marsha Ambrosius	Dem Jointz	3:48
Total length:				57:38

Notes

- ^{^[a]} signifies an additional producer.
- "Long Story Short" samples "Out There", written by Jordan Houston, Paul Beauregard, and Patrick Houston, and performed by Project Pat.
- "Shame" interpolates "Shame on a Nigga" written by Lamont Hawkins, Clifford Smith, Corey Woods, Dennis Coles, Gary Grice, Jason Hunter, Robert Diggs, and Russell Jones, and performed by Wu-Tang Clan.

== Personnel ==
Musicians

- 2 Chainz – vocals
- Lil Wayne – vocals
- 50 Cent – speaker (tracks 1, 6, 11, 16, 20)
- Nolan Presley – programming (track 2)
- Big Papito – programming (track 2)
- B Ham – background vocals, drums (track 8)
- MarcLo – drums (track 8)
- Jack Freeman – additional vocals (track 10)
- Murda Beatz – drums, percussion (track 18)
- Jordan Fox – keyboards, strings (track 18)
- Sitara – additional vocals (track 19)
- Von Waters – additional vocals (track 19)
- Mighty Max – saxophone (track 19)
- Streetrunner – strings (track 19)
- Dem Jointz – programming (track 21)

Technical

- Glenn Schick – mastering
- Finis White – mixing (tracks 2, 3, 5, 8–10, 12–15, 17–19, 21)
- Fabian Marasciullo – mixing (track 4)
- Mike Dean – mixing (track 7)
- Nolan Presley – engineering (tracks 2–5, 7–10, 12–15, 17–19, 21)
- Cristal Viramontes – engineering (tracks 2–5, 7–10, 12–15, 17–19, 21)
- Manny Galvez – engineering (tracks 2–5, 7–10, 12–15, 17–19, 21)
- Anthony R. Smith – engineering (track 9)
- Sloane Esme – mixing assistance (track 4)

== Charts ==
=== Weekly charts ===
Weekly chart performance for Welcome 2 Collegrove
Chart (2023)	Peak position
Canadian Albums (Billboard)	84
UK Album Downloads (Official Charts)	96
US Billboard 200	20
US Top R&B/Hip-Hop Albums (Billboard)	4

=== Year-end charts ===
Year-end chart performance for Welcome 2 Collegrove
Chart (2024)	Position
US Top R&B/Hip-Hop Albums (Billboard)	98
