= Terminator (King Promise song) =

Single by King Promise

from the album True To Self
- Released: 5 May 2023
- Genre: Highlife; Afrobeats
- Length: 3:54
- Label: 5K Records Limited; Sony Music UK
- Lyricists: KillBeatz; King Promise
- Producer: KillBeatz

Music video
- Terminator (Remix) on YouTube

Official audio
- Terminator on YouTube
- Terminator (Remix) on YouTube

Official visualiser
- Terminator on YouTube

"Terminator" is a song by Ghanaian singer-songwriter King Promise, released on 5 May 2023 through 5K Records Limited and Sony Music UK from the record, True To Self. The song is in collaboration with KillBeatz, who produced along with wrote the song's lyrics. Two remixes were released shortly after the song's release, the first featuring Young Jonn and the latter featuring Tiwa Savage and Sean Paul.

The song became King Promise's most successful song, suppressing 200 million streams across all major streaming platforms and being used in over 1 million videos on just TikTok alone, as of 2024. "Terminator" peaked at number six on the TurnTable Top 100 and number eight on the UK Afrobeats Singles Chart.

== Background ==
KillBeatz was behind both King Promise's breakout single "Oh Yeah" in 2017 and "Terminator".

== Critical reception ==
"Terminator" became the most streamed song of 2023 in Ghana on Spotify. He became the first Afrobeats artist to perform in Singapore. In an interview with BET, King Promise explained his reaction to the song's success.

I knew it would be a great record from how it took off. [sic] I've had a few number ones, if not a lot, so I could tell where it was going. But, obviously, it's done a lot of things that all those records didn't do. Obviously, it’s different times like when I dropped ‘Commando’ in 2019. Now, it's like TikTok. ‘Terminator’ just took off crazy. Did I expect it that crazy? I didn't think little. I just allowed my imagination to fly like, ‘let's see how far it gets,’ but I couldn't pinpoint it was gonna get there.

== Remixes ==
On 14 July 2023, King Promise released a remix to the song, featuring Nigerian singer and producer Young Jonn. By then, the song had already reached 20 million streams. On 8 December 2023, he released another remix to the song, this time featuring Jamaican artist Sean Paul and Nigerian singer Tiwa Savage.

== Accolades ==
Awards and nominations for "Terminator"
Organization	Year	Category	Result	Ref.
3Music Awards	2024	Song Of The Year	Won	
Ghana Music Awards	2024	Most Popular Song	Won	
Ghana Music Awards	2024	International Collaboration of The Year	Nominated	
Ghana Music Awards	2024	Best Afropop Song	Won	

== Charts ==
Chart performance for "Terminator"
Chart (2023)	Peak
Nigeria (TurnTable Top 100)	6
UK Afrobeats (Official Charts)	8

== Release history ==
Release history for "Terminator"
Region	Date	Format	Version	Label
Various	5 May 2023	Digital download; streaming	Original	5K Records Limited; Sony Music UK
Various	6 July 2023	Digital download; streaming	Remix	5K Records Limited; Sony Music UK
Various	8 December 2023	Digital download; streaming	Remix	5K Records Limited; Sony Music UK
