= Transparency (song) =

2023 single by 2 Chainz, Lil Wayne and Usher

Single by 2 Chainz, Lil Wayne and Usher

from the album Welcome 2 Collegrove
- Released: November 17, 2023
- Genre: Hip-hop; R&B
- Length: 3:15
- Label: Gamebread; Def Jam
- Songwriters: Tauheed Epps; Dwayne Carter; Usher Raymond; Christian Ward; Lerron Carson; Francis Leblanc; Mike Dean; Chris Brown; Altariq Crapps; Christopher Dotson
- Producers: Hitmaka; Paul Cabbin; Fridayy; Mike Dean; Tariq Beats; Chrishan

2 Chainz singles chronology
"Long Story Short" (2023)	"Transparency" (2023)

Lil Wayne singles chronology
"Long Story Short" (2023)	"Transparency" (2023)	"Wassam Baby" (2024)

Usher singles chronology
"Dientes" (2023)	"Transparency" (2023)	"Standing Next to You" (remix) (2023)

Music video
- "Transparency" on YouTube

"Transparency" is a song by American rappers 2 Chainz and Lil Wayne, and American singer Usher. It was released on November 17, 2023, as the third single from their collaborative studio album Welcome 2 Collegrove (2023).

== Background ==
"Transparency" was originally a Chris Brown song featuring 2 Chainz, that was supposed to be included on his tenth studio album Breezy (2022), and sampled Michael Jackson's 1982 song "The Lady In My Life". However, the song wasn't released, with Brown stating in 2022: "We couldn't clear the sample and we felt it took away from the song if that music wasn't there", unofficially releasing a solo version of it on his Instagram account.

The track was later taken by 2 Chainz and Lil Wayne for their 2023 collaborative studio album Welcome 2 Collegrove, enlisting Fridayy, Hitmaka, Mike Dean, Paul Cabbin and Tarik Beats to rearrange its instrumental, and Usher to perform the song's chorus.

== Critical reception ==
Slant commented the song saying that it's "a repurposing of a previously leaked Chris Brown song. It’s supposedly a somewhat serious song about integrity, but the two rappers groaningly take the titular concept literally, making cracks about, among other things, see-through garments". HipHopDX stated that the song "feel[s] dated and slapdash", adding that it "rips lyrics from the chorus of a 2021 Chris Brown song of the same name, sounds like a lazy reach for radio play".

== Music video ==
The music video for "Transparency" was released alongside the song.

== Charts ==
=== Weekly charts ===
Weekly chart performance for "Transparency"
Chart (2023–2024)	Peak position
US Bubbling Under Hot 100 (Billboard)	3
US Hot R&B/Hip-Hop Songs (Billboard)	35
US Rhythmic Airplay (Billboard)	12

=== Year-end charts ===
2024 year-end chart performance for "Transparency"
Chart (2024)	Position
US Rhythmic (Billboard)	50
