= Presha =

2023 single by 2 Chainz and Lil Wayne

Single by 2 Chainz and Lil Wayne

from the album Welcome 2 Collegrove
- Released: October 20, 2023
- Genre: Trap
- Length: 3:05
- Label: Gamebread; Def Jam
- Songwriters: Tauheed Epps; Dwayne Carter Jr.; Shondrae Crawford; Mike Elizondo; Curtis Jackson III; Andre Young
- Producer: Bangladesh

2 Chainz singles chronology
"Room" (2023)	"Presha" (2023)	"Long Story Short" (2023)

Lil Wayne singles chronology
"Brand New" (2023)	"Presha" (2023)	"Big Dog" (2023)

"Presha" is a song by American rappers 2 Chainz and Lil Wayne, released on October 20, 2023 as the lead single from their collaborative studio album Welcome 2 Collegrove (2023). It was produced by Bangladesh.

== Background ==
Lil Wayne confirmed the single on October 17, 2023, when he posted a 12-second video of him and 2 Chainz posing for photos as the song plays in the background, along with the captions "Pressure coming 10/20".

== Composition ==
The production of the song uses a trap beat containing high-pitched whistling loop and thumping bass. Described as "high-energy", the song begins with someone yelling "Yoooo! This shit is un-believ-able!" before the beat plays. 2 Chainz performs the first verse; about halfway through the song, Lil Wayne performs his verse in a fast-paced flow, with lyrics about topics such as women and guns as well as a reference to NBA player Devin Booker.

== Critical reception ==
Tom Breihan of Stereogum gave a positive review, writing "The two rappers have a blast ripping that track to pieces; Wayne's double-time verse is especially impressive." Andre Ellington of HipHopDX commented that 2 Chainz "takes things back to the essence of why people gravitated toward his music with playful bars that are meant to be played in rotation at celebratory events" and that Lil Wayne "takes the baton and doesn't disappoint as he uses his uncanny ability to morph his delivery to the cadence of each record that he appears on."

== Live performances ==
On October 20, 2023, 2 Chainz and Lil Wayne performed the song on The Tonight Show Starring Jimmy Fallon.

== Charts ==
Chart performance for "Presha"
Chart (2023)	Peak position
US Bubbling Under Hot 100 (Billboard)	1
US Hot R&B/Hip-Hop Songs (Billboard)	32
