= Beautiful (DJ Khaled song) =

2022 song by DJ Khaled featuring Future and SZA

Song by DJ Khaled featuring Future and SZA

from the album God Did
- Released: August 26, 2022
- Length: 3:43
- Label: We the Best; Epic
- Songwriters: Khaled Khaled; Nayvadius Wilburn; Solana Rowe; Bryan Simmons
- Producers: DJ Khaled; TM88; KXVI

Music video
- "Beautiful" on YouTube

"Beautiful" is a song by American record producer DJ Khaled featuring American rapper Future and American singer SZA from the former's thirteenth studio album God Did (2022). It was written by the artists alongside TM88, who produced it with KXVI and Khaled.

== Critical reception ==
The song was met with generally mixed reviews. AllMusic's Andy Kellman commented it "verges on dreary with SZA outclassing duet partner Future. (SZA's "I took a flight for the Patek/You said, 'Bae, you're so dramatic' -- I guess" qualifies as the most ridiculous lyric on a Khaled LP.)" Paul Attard of Slant Magazine considered it among the collaborations on God Did that came off as "cloyingly artificial", writing, "Future and SZA add little passion to the frigid 'Beautiful'". Similarly, Robert Blair of HotNewHipHop wrote, "Pluto's team up with SZA on 'Beautiful' feels disjointed and inherently spliced together." Dani Blum of Pitchfork wrote, "SZA gets confined to the chorus on 'Beautiful,' when she could've added zest to Future's croaky raps about eating shrooms and burning sage."

A few critics gave positive reviews. Mosi Reeves of Rolling Stone wrote, "Fans continue to debate whether Future is still an artistic force or a complacent superstar in decline, but his pairing with SZA on 'Beautiful' generates a few sparks." HipHopDX's Ben Brutocao wrote that it "finds Future at his most compelling and likable, with two excellent verses separated by a grand chorus from SZA."

== Music video ==
The music video was released on August 30, 2022. Directed by Colin Tilley, it opens with DJ Khaled on a boat with a young woman and complimenting her beautiful features, before showing him, Future and SZA on a mirrored platform in the sand. In separate shots, Khaled is seen driving large vehicles, giving the woman a shoulder massage and serving her lobster with a glass of Villon cognac by the ocean; Future performs in front of an ocean setting; and SZA sings on a lit pathway while wearing a "knitted ensemble". The three join each at nighttime by the fireside.

== Charts ==
Chart performance for "Beautiful"
Chart (2022)	Peak position
Canada Hot 100 (Billboard)	46
Global 200 (Billboard)	53
New Zealand Hot Singles (RMNZ)	7
South Africa Streaming (TOSAC)	17
UK Singles (OCC)	67
US Billboard Hot 100	29
US Hot R&B/Hip-Hop Songs (Billboard)	10

== Certifications ==
Certifications for "Beautiful"
Region	Certification	Certified units/sales
United States (RIAA)	Gold	500,000^{‡}
^{‡} Sales+streaming figures based on certification alone.
