= Juice Wrld Did =

2022 song by DJ Khaled featuring Juice Wrld

"Juice WRLD Did"

Song by DJ Khaled featuring Juice WRLD

from the album God Did
- Released: August 26, 2022
- Recorded: December 13, 2018
- Genre: Hip hop; trap
- Length: 3:27
- Label: We the Best; Epic
- Songwriters: Khaled Khaled; Jarad Higgins; Nicholas Mira; Dorien Theus
- Producers: Nick Mira; DT

"Juice Wrld Did" is a song by American producer DJ Khaled featuring late American rapper Juice WRLD from the former's thirteenth studio album God Did (2022). It was produced by Nick Mira and DT of Internet Money Records.

== Background ==
While working on his thirteenth studio album GOD DID, Khaled received a text from Lil Bibby regarding "Juice Wrld Did", a song Juice Wrld made heavily referencing DJ Khaled. Upon receiving the file for the song, as revealed in a conversation on X (formerly Twitter), Khaled "immediately ran to [his] laptop ... to play [the song in his] speakers". Although adding his producer tags to the intro, Khaled wanted to preserve the song as it was made by Juice. Citing God as the reason for the song's release and the timing of the situation, Khaled later included "Juice Wrld Did" as the fifteenth track on GOD DID.

== Lyrics ==
Juice Wrld's verses on "Juice Wrld Did" serve as a lyrical display of boastful and confident expression of success, power, and dominance. Juice Wrld reflects on his accomplishments, portraying himself as unbeatable and at the top of his game. The lyrics touch on themes of wealth, guns, loyalty to his gang (No Limit), and his unchangeable nature. There is also a playful, yet aggressive, tone in his references to violence and his lifestyle, emphasizing his relentless drive and the fact that he will not back down from challenge. The song overall celebrates his rise to success and the power he holds in his career and life.

== Critical reception ==
The song received generally positive reviews from critics. Andy Kellman of AllMusic wrote, "the wobbling/chiming track is among the album's few other memorable moments despite being dusted off and slapped into the sequence after Khaled added his vocal stamp. Its bittersweet quality is strongest when Juice, who died in 2019, declares himself rookie of the year." Ben Brutocao of HipHopDX stated, "JUICE WRLD DID" is one of the most natural posthumous tracks this year, and reminds everyone that we lost a generational talent, which is a reminder that no one needed, but everyone could use." Writing for Pitchfork, Dani Blum commented, "the late Juice Wrld shines on a track that's just him". HotNewHipHop's Robert Blair wrote of the song, "Performed by a charged and almost agonizingly vibrant Juice Wrld, his verses show off his sheer lyrical aptitude and his mastery of flow that he often divulged during radio show freestyles while the intricate Nick Mira production feels as organic."

Robin Murray of Clash had a less favorable reaction to the song, writing, "'Juice Wrld Did' is a short piece, a fond tribute to the late rapper; the actual recording is insubstantial though, while smothering Juice Wrld's delivery in his 'DJ KHALED!!!!' cypher isn't the most subtle of moves."

== Charts ==
Chart performance for "Juice Wrld Did"
Chart (2022)	Peak position
Canada Hot 100 (Billboard)	56
Global 200 (Billboard)	99
New Zealand Hot Singles (RMNZ)	13
US Billboard Hot 100	55
US Hot R&B/Hip-Hop Songs (Billboard)	16
