= Big Time (DJ Khaled song) =

2022 single by DJ Khaled featuring Future and Lil Baby

Single by DJ Khaled featuring Future and Lil Baby

from the album God Did
- Released: November 1, 2022
- Length: 2:53
- Label: We the Best; Epic
- Songwriters: Khaled Khaled; Nayvadius Wilburn; Dominique Jones; Bryan Simmons
- Producers: DJ Khaled; TM88; Rozay Knockin; Marko Lenz; Brook Beatz

DJ Khaled singles chronology
"Staying Alive" (2022)	"Big Time" (2022)	"Supposed to Be Loved" (2023)

Future singles chronology
"Blues" (2022)	"Big Time" (2022)

Lil Baby singles chronology
"Caciques" (2022)	"Big Time" (2022)

Music video
- "Big Time" on YouTube

"Big Time" is a song by American producer DJ Khaled featuring American rappers Future and Lil Baby. It was sent to rhythmic contemporary radio on November 1, 2022, as the second single from the Khaled's thirteenth studio album God Did (2022).

== Critical reception ==
The song was met with a generally negative reception from music critics. Ben Brutocao of HipHopDX considered it among the tracks from God Did that "holds this project firmly back." Dani Blum of Pitchfork wrote, "Even Lil Baby can't resuscitate 'Big Time' from a plodding beat and the absurdity of Future's first line: 'Rainbow Audemars 'cause my bitch bisexual.'"

== Music video ==
The official music video was released on August 26, 2022. It opens with DJ Khaled in a bubble bath, surrounded by "scantily clad beauties". One woman fans him with a palm frond and another feeds him grapes. When Khaled demands his butler to bring him a towel, another one of them appears only to remove the tray cover. Most of the clip sees Khaled, Future and Lil Baby on a lawn of a large mansion while in the company of women in bikinis, some of whom are lounging by the pool. All three artists wear a Royal Oak in the video.

== Charts ==
Chart performance for "Big Time"
Chart (2022)	Peak position
Canada Hot 100 (Billboard)	50
Global 200 (Billboard)	62
New Zealand Hot Singles (RMNZ)	11
South Africa Streaming (TOSAC)	15
US Billboard Hot 100	31
US Hot R&B/Hip-Hop Songs (Billboard)	11
US Rhythmic Airplay (Billboard)	29
