= True to Self (King Promise album) =

Studio album by King Promise
- Released: 14 June 2024
- Genres: Highlife; Afrobeats
- Length: 37:47
- Labels: 5K Records Limited; Sony Music UK
- Producers: Cole YoursTruly; GuiltyBeatz; Hylander; Ragee; Telz; KillBeatz; Niphkeys

King Promise chronology
5 Star (2022)	True to Self (2024)

Singles from True To Self
- 1. "Terminator" Released: 5 May 2024; 2. "Perfect Combi" Released: 23 August 2023; 3. "Paris" Released: 8 March 2024; 4. "Favourite Story" Released: 24 May 2024

True to Self is the third studio album by Ghanaian singer-songwriter King Promise, released on 14 June 2024 through 5K Records Limited and Sony Music UK. The album includes features from Shallipopi, Fave, Gabzy, Fridayy, Lasmid, Ladipoe, Sarkodie, and OliveTheBoy. Throughout its 12 tracks, the album blends in a mixture of the music genres Highlife and Afrobeats.

== Background ==
True to Self follows King Promise's two previous studio albums, As Promised (2019) and 5 Star (2022), the first of which was his debut.

== Recording and production ==
The album is a fusion between the music genres Highlife and Afrobeats, and features artists such as Shallipopi, Fave, Gabzy, Fridayy, Lasmid, Ladipoe, Sarkodie, and OliveTheBoy. In an interview with Revolt, Promise described the tracks on the album ranges between "uptempo, calm, love music, life music and hustle music."

In the same interview, King Promise goes insight on the overall theme of the album.

It's not bad to evolve. I feel like a lot of sounds have come out of Afrobeats, which people have chosen to categorize differently. Afropop, 'Afro this,' 'Afro that,' at the end of the day, they’re all Afrobeats. That's how I see it.

True to Self's lyricism centers around Promise's journey to stardom, struggles, and his love life.

== Release and critical reception ==
Soon after the album's release, on 19 June 2024, Ghanaian music entrepreneur Smallgod brought True to Self's cover art for ₵500,000 ($38,040). The purchase took place at Country Club, Trasacco, Accra.

=== Promotion ===
In celebration of the album's release, King Promise embarked on the True to Self world tour, which spanned 12 cities across North America, Europe, Asia, and Australia.

=== Accolades ===
The album's lead single "Terminator" won Song Of The Year at the 2024 3Music Awards and Most Popular Song, along with Best Afropop Song at the 2024 Ghana Music Awards but was nominated for International Collaboration of The Year, along with the album's other single "Perfect Combi". King Promise also won Best Afrobeat/Afropop Artist at the 2024 Ghana Music Awards. At the 26th edition of the Ghana Music Awards, True to Self won Album of the Year.

== Track listing ==
True to Self track listing (standard edition)
No.	Title	Producer(s)	Length
1.	"Believe"	Cole YoursTruly	3:09
2.	"Continental" (featuring Shallipopi)	GuiltyBeatz	3:00
3.	"Permission Granted" (featuring Fave)	Hylander	2:34
4.	"Paris"	Ragee	2:20
5.	"Perfect Combi" (with Gabzy)	GuiltyBeatz	3:01
6.	"Paranoid" (featuring Fridayy)	Telz	3:32
7.	"Ringing in My Head"	Cole YoursTruly	2:38
8.	"9:45" (featuring Lasmid and Ladipoe)	GuiltyBeatz	3:46
9.	"Mad Oh"	GuiltyBeatz	3:09
10.	"Favourite Story" (with Sarkodie and OliveTheBoy)	GuiltyBeatz; KillBeatz	3:56
11.	"Own It"	Niphkeys	2:42
12.	"Terminator"	GuiltyBeatz	3:54
Total length:			37:47

Deluxe edition (bonus tracks)
No.	Title	Producer(s)	Length
1.	"Eyes Dried Over" (featuring Tom Walker)	Cole YoursTruly; GuiltyBeatz	2:44
2.	"Set Me Free"	Hylander	3:06
3.	"Keep It Sexy"	KillBeatz	2:39
4.	"2 Paranoid" (featuring Ronisia)	Telz	3:33
Total length:			49:52

== Charts ==
Chart performance for True to Self
Chart (2025)	Peak position
Nigerian Albums (TurnTable)	57

== Release history ==
Release history and formats for True to Self
Region	Date	Edition	Format(s)	Label
Various	14 June 2024	Standard	Streaming; digital download	5K Records Limited; Sony Music UK
Various	13 December 2024	deluxe	Streaming; digital download	5K Records Limited; Sony Music UK

== Work cited ==
- Nwanji, Ngozi (17 June 2024). "King Promise says his album 'True To Self' is his "best body of work" yet". Revolt.
