= Long Story Short (2 Chainz and Lil Wayne song) =

2023 single by 2 Chainz and Lil Wayne

Single by 2 Chainz and Lil Wayne

from the album Welcome 2 Collegrove
- Released: November 10, 2023
- Length: 3:30
- Label: Gamebread; Def Jam
- Songwriters: Tauheed Epps; Dwayne Carter Jr.; Byron Thomas; Justin Scott; Jordan Houston; Anna Gaye; Elgie Stover; Iris Gordy; Paul Beauregard; Patrick Houston; Marvin Gaye
- Producers: Mannie Fresh; Big K.R.I.T.; Juicy J

2 Chainz singles chronology
"Presha" (2023)	"Long Story Short" (2023)	"Transparency" (2023)

Lil Wayne singles chronology
"Big Dog" (2023)	"Long Story Short" (2023)	"Transparency" (2023)

Music video
- "Long Story Short" on YouTube

"Long Story Short" is a song by American rappers 2 Chainz and Lil Wayne, released on November 10, 2023, as the second single from their collaborative studio album Welcome 2 Collegrove (2023). Produced by Mannie Fresh, Big K.R.I.T. and Juicy J, it contains a sample of "Out There" by Project Pat.

== Background ==
The song and its music video were teased on social media on November 8, 2023. Before being released, it was rumored to feature Juicy J.

== Composition ==
Over the sample, the artists rap about their ways of life, with lyrics centering on the notion of living life to the fullest. Lil Wayne opens the song with the chorus, in which he details his wild lifestyle, while 2 Chainz's verse is about successfully balancing family life and business.

== Critical reception ==
Tallie Spencer of HotNewHipHop gave a positive review of the song, praising the chemistry of 2 Chainz and Lil Wayne.

== Music video ==
The music video was directed by Maya Table and released alongside the single. In it, the rappers show off two Mercedes coupes, and ride in one of them through Los Angeles.

== Live performances ==
On November 13, 2023, 2 Chainz and Lil Wayne performed the song on Jimmy Kimmel Live!.

== Charts ==
Chart performance for "Long Story Short"
Chart (2023)	Peak position
US Bubbling Under Hot 100 (Billboard)	6
US Hot R&B/Hip-Hop Songs (Billboard)	40
