= Staying Alive (song) =

2022 single by DJ Khaled featuring Drake and Lil Baby

Single by DJ Khaled featuring Drake and Lil Baby

from the album God Did
- Released: August 5, 2022
- Genre: Hip hop; trap
- Length: 2:58
- Label: We the Best; Epic
- Songwriters: Khaled Khaled; Aubrey Graham; Dominique Jones; Nyan Lieberthal; Timothy Suby; Barry Gibb; Maurice Gibb; Robin Gibb
- Producers: Lieberthal; Suby

DJ Khaled singles chronology
"We Set the Trends (Remix)" (2022)	"Staying Alive" (2022)	"Big Time" (2022)

Drake singles chronology
"Massive" / "Sticky" (2022)	"Staying Alive" (2022)	"Jimmy Cooks" (2022)

Lil Baby singles chronology
"Never Sleep" (2022)	"Staying Alive" (2022)	"Detox" (2022)

Music video
- "Staying Alive" on YouTube

"Staying Alive" is a song by American record producer DJ Khaled featuring Canadian rapper Drake and American rapper Lil Baby, released on August 5, 2022, as the lead single from the former's thirteenth studio album God Did (2022). The song contains an interpolation of "Stayin' Alive" by the Bee Gees.

== Composition ==
The song begins with the chorus, in which Drake sings in Auto-Tuned vocals and interpolates the chorus of "Stayin' Alive" by the Bee Gees: "Try me a hundred times / Wanted me to lie, wanted me to cry, wanted me to die / Ah, ah, ah, I'm stayin' alive, I'm stayin' alive, I'm stayin' alive, I'm stayin' alive". Drake performs the first verse, while Lil Baby performs the second verse. The song features "sharp hi-hats" in the production and has been considered a midtempo track.

== Music video ==
A music video directed by RT! was released alongside the single. The video was shot at York University. The visual takes place in the fictional Khaled Khaled Hospital, and stars DJ Khaled as head of general surgery, Lil Baby as head of cardiothoracic surgery, and Drake as head of neuro surgery. Wearing blue scrubs and a stethoscope, Drake smokes hookah and takes shots with the staff, and also mindlessly signs charts and waves off nurses. Meanwhile, Lil Baby smokes a blunt while performing surgery, and then wears a white doctor's coat while partying in a club within the hospital. Later, the three artists meet at the hospital's parking lot, surrounded by ambulances.

== Charts ==
=== Weekly charts ===
Weekly chart performance for "Staying Alive"
Chart (2022)	Peak position
Australia (ARIA)	16
Austria (Ö3 Austria Top 40)	65
Canada Hot 100 (Billboard)	3
Canada CHR/Top 40 (Billboard)	44
Denmark (Tracklisten)	31
Germany (GfK)	60
Global 200 (Billboard)	10
Iceland (Tónlistinn)	11
Ireland (IRMA)	26
Lithuania (AGATA)	58
Netherlands (Single Top 100)	79
New Zealand (Recorded Music NZ)	19
Norway (VG-lista)	31
Portugal (AFP)	64
South Africa Streaming (TOSAC)	4
Sweden (Sverigetopplistan)	36
Switzerland (Schweizer Hitparade)	22
UK Singles (Official Charts)	21
UK Hip Hop/R&B (Official Charts)	5
US Billboard Hot 100	5
US Hot R&B/Hip-Hop Songs (Billboard)	3
US Pop Airplay (Billboard)	31
US Rhythmic Airplay (Billboard)	1

=== Year-end charts ===
2022 year-end chart performance for "Staying Alive"
Chart (2022)	Position
US Hot R&B/Hip-Hop Songs (Billboard)	33
US Rhythmic (Billboard)	36

== Certifications ==
Certifications for "Staying Alive"
Region	Certification	Certified units/sales
Canada (Music Canada)	Platinum	80,000^{‡}
New Zealand (RMNZ)	Gold	15,000^{‡}
Switzerland (IFPI Switzerland)	Gold	10,000^{‡}
United States (RIAA)	Platinum	1,000,000^{‡}
^{‡} Sales+streaming figures based on certification alone.
