= Use This Gospel =

2019 song by Kanye West

Song by Kanye West featuring Clipse and Kenny G

from the album Jesus Is King
- Released: October 25, 2019
- Recorded: 2019
- Genre: Gospel
- Length: 3:34
- Label: GOOD; Def Jam
- Songwriters: Kanye West; Gene Thornton; Terrence Thornton; Kenneth Bruce Gorelick; Angel Lopez; Michael Suski; Federico Vindver; Timothy Mosley; Jahmal Gwin; Jordan Timothy Jenks; Derek Watkins; Rennard East; Matthew Leon
- Producers: Kanye West; Angel Lopez; DrtWrk; Federico Vindver; Timbaland

"Use This Gospel" is a song by American rapper Kanye West from his ninth studio album, Jesus Is King (2019). The song features guest appearances from hip-hop duo Clipse and jazz saxophonist Kenny G. It was produced by West, Angel Lopez, DrtWrk, Federico Vindver, and Timbaland, with co-production from BoogzDaBeast and Pi'erre Bourne. The song was recorded as a new version of the leaked track "Law of Attraction", which West came up with in a freestyle session. Clipse's feature on the song marked their reunion, after West requested for a collaboration. A gospel number with a maximalist style, it samples Two Door Cinema Club's "Costume Party" and includes a saxophone solo from Kenny G.

Lyrically, the song features Clipse offering self-reflection from each member's different stages and West delivering traditional Christian prayer language. "Use This Gospel" received generally positive reviews from music critics, who mostly appreciated Clipse's presence. They often focused on the duo's reunion, while some critics commended Kenny G's performance. The song debuted at number 37 on the US Billboard Hot 100, making Kenny G the fifth artist to achieve a top 40 hit every decade since the 1980s. It reached number 23 on the Latvian Singles Chart and attained top 50 positions in five other countries, including Canada and Iceland. In the United States, the song has been certified gold by the Recording Industry Association of America (RIAA).

West, Clipse, Kenny G, and the Sunday Service Choir performed the song live in a meadow at The Forum in October 2019. In the album's accompanying film of the same name, Kanye briefly hums it as a lullaby to Psalm West. A remix of "Use This Gospel", featuring Eminem, was released on DJ Khaled's thirteenth studio album, God Did (2022). Dr. Dre produced the remix with the ICU. Replacing Clipse on the original track, Eminem raps about using faith to battle his personal demons. The remix garnered mostly positive reviews from critics, a number of whom praised Eminem's verse. It reached number 49 on the Hot 100, while topping both the US Christian Songs and Gospel Songs charts.

== Background ==
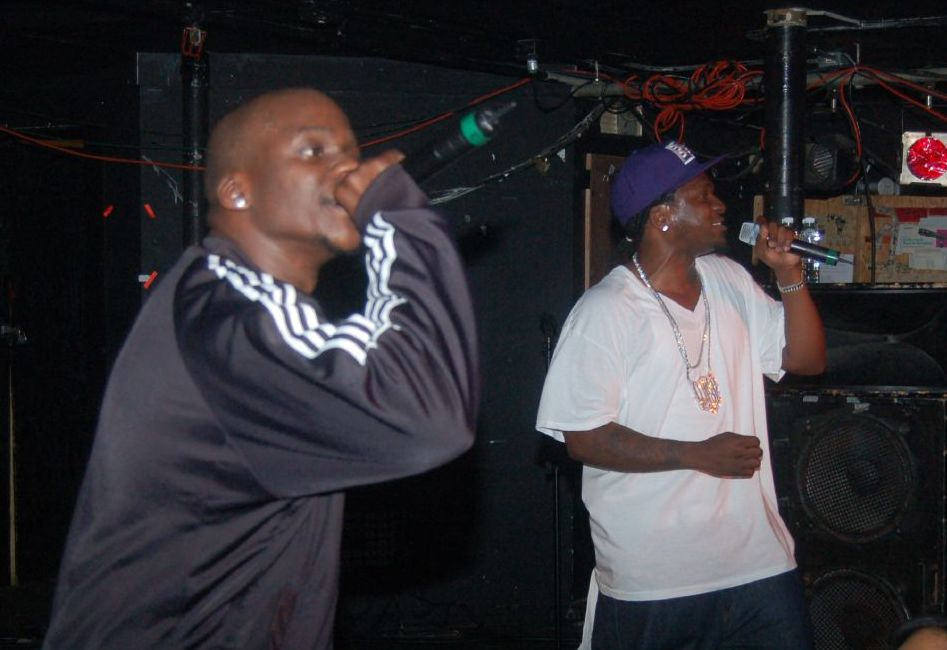
The song features a guest appearance from Clipse on their reunion, after West's request to collaborate with them.

On Valentine's Day 2019, West invited Kenny G to perform music for his wife Kim Kardashian in their living room. Following the performance, West allowed Kenny G to join him in the studio to hear material on Jesus Is King. After hearing various tracks, Kenny G suggested that his saxophone "would sound really good" on "Use This Gospel". West considered this idea "cool" and pulled out a microphone to record Kenny G's part, who kept the track for later reverb and EQ tweaks. Kenny G declared he was highly proud "somebody of Kanye's caliber" that could call a lot of different people believed he "would be a person that he would want in this intimate vibe, serenading his wife". He expressed overall positive feelings, saying he was proud to create "a beautiful sound", was "very touched", and appreciated the happiness he brought to others. Discussing his appearance on the album prior to release, Kenny G summarized how he had "heard little snippets" that were posted online, but not the final song and was "sure it's cool" from what he listened to. He also addressed a misconception his audience is "primarily white yuppies", asking that if this is true, "Why is [West] asking me to play on his record?" Kenny G developed a friendship with West after they worked together, recalling fond memories of trading texts with the rapper, and describing him as "very nice [and] sweet". In April 2022, he enthusiastically offered to provide an encore performance to reunite West and Kardashian.

Clipse's appearance on the track marked a return of the duo, five years after member No Malice promised that they would not have a reunion. West requested a feature from Clipse, though member Pusha T was unsure if No Malice would accept or not. Pusha T expressed his feelings towards the duo collaborating again in a phone call with Vulture, stating: "I'm the younger brother, man. I mean, I'm happier than — I can't even express it!" The rapper admitted that he had a lack of hope for a reunion due to No Malice turning down profitable gigs, though attributed this to his collaborator possibly feeling he should have been more present in his works. He said the entire theme of the album "totally speaks to where my brother is", and elaborated, assuring that No Malice and West "bonded, probably way more than me and Ye [did]" for the song's creation. In an October 2019 interview with New Zealand DJ Zane Lowe, West remembered not wanting to rap until No Malice persuaded him to do it for "Use This Gospel", explaining he "didn't know how to rap for God" and concluding, "This is such a win for the kingdom." Prior to sampling Northern Irish band Two Door Cinema Club on the song, West had shared the music video for their single "I Can Talk" (2009) on his blog in 2010.

== Composition and lyrics ==
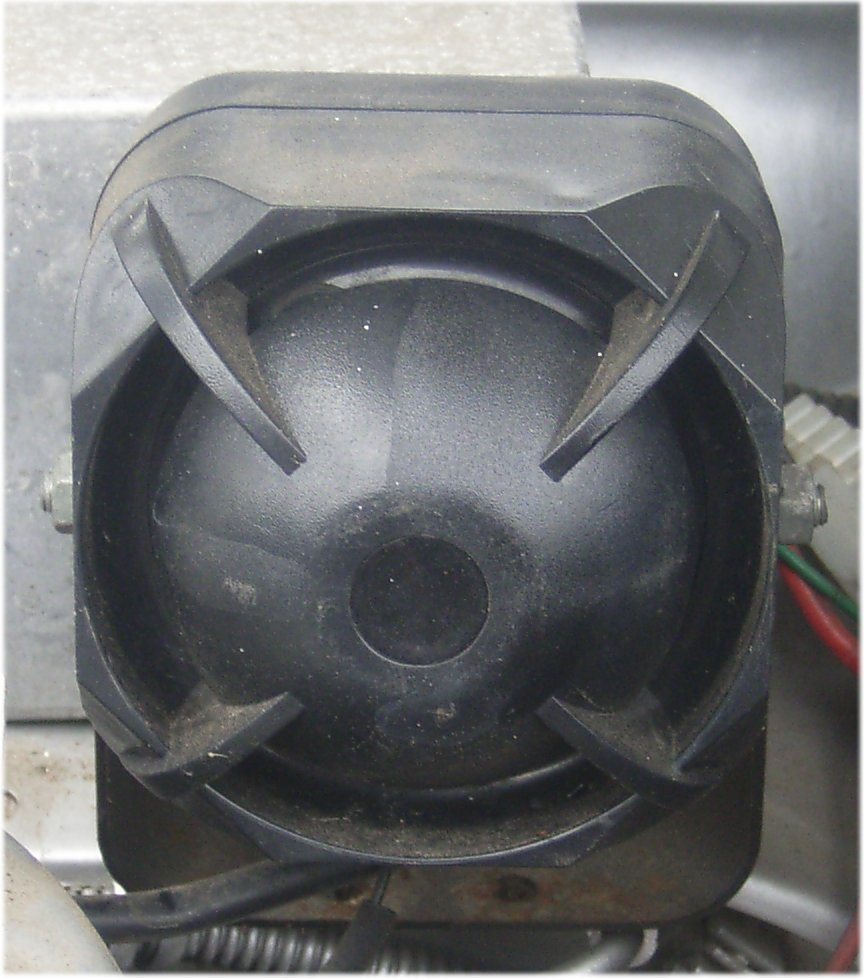
Multiple music journalists compared the prominent keys to a car alarm, with writers for The Washington Post describing the sound as "incessant dinging".

Musically, "Use This Gospel" is a gospel number, with a maximalist style. It includes a sample of the 2010 track "Costume Party" by Two Door Cinema Club. The song is constructed around dinky keys that were described as sounding like an open door car alert, contributed by Argentine record producer Federico Vindver. These are accompanied by layered, digitized harmonic vocoder tones that distort and imitate West's wordless melody. At the beginning, the song features the drone of a single key's pulse, with the harmonies appearing later on. Towards the climax, a vibrant saxophone solo from Kenny G transitions into the outro. The solo is based on the wordless melody and appears abruptly, lasting around 40 seconds. West sings the song's hook, while both members of Clipse contribute a brief verse.

In the lyrics of "Use This Gospel", both members of Clipse deliver self-reflection from different stages, connecting the universality of gospel. On the hook, West provides traditional Christian prayer language, including the lyrics "We call on your blessings / In the Father, we put our faith" and "Use this gospel for protection, it's a hard road to heaven". No Malice insists that his music conveys a positive message and repents for his past mistakes, declaring his verse to be "faith talk". Pusha T references his morality using self-deprecation in his verse, such as admitting "Who [a]m I to judge? I'm crooked as Vegas".

== Recording ==
In December 2018, West collaborator Timbaland and Vindver took part in recording sessions with numerous rappers in Miami, including Saweetie and Lil Mosey. West had arrived at the sessions in under 24 hours, with Vindver recalling that West "bl[ew them] away" when he started "playing tracks for the Yandhi project." (Note: Yandhi was ultimately scrapped and replaced with Jesus Is King.) Vindver detailed the collaborative process between West and Timbaland, saying: "Timbaland would freestyle with him in the studio — Tim on the drum machine, Kanye singing in real time. He wanted to make more healing music at that time. But he was still finding what it was." West and Timbaland were reported to be recording together in Miami again during January 2019 for completion of the album, alongside rappers such as Lil Wayne, 2 Chainz, and YNW Melly. In addition to the song, Timbaland contributed production to Jesus Is King tracks "Closed on Sunday", "Water", "Hands On", and "Jesus Is Lord". "Use This Gospel" was produced by West, Mexican-American music producer Angel Lopez, DrtWrk, Vindver, and Timbaland, while co-produced by BoogzDaBeast and Pi'erre Bourne. (Note: Find additional credits for the song on the BMI Repertoire by searching the work number #40758413.)

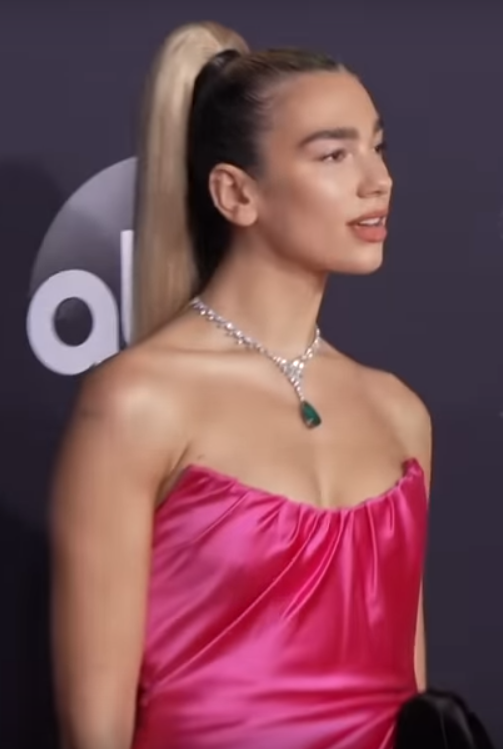
References tracks by Dua Lipa for "Law of Attraction" were part of an internet leak in July 2019, while full versions of her performing the original leaked in October 2020.

Lopez recalled that the track "Law of Attraction" stemmed from a freestyle session with Timbaland, during which West hummed its main melody. After the session, Lopez told Vindver to add vocoder to the vocal. Lopez stated that West "went insane" after hearing the track and grabbed his microphone to freestyle the chorus. Lopez recalled that out of the 70 songs that were done in the freestyle session, only "Law of Attraction" was kept, which according to him, was "a crucial piece of music that we worked on, which kept us in the conversation a week later". Singer-songwriter Ant Clemons wrote the track for Yandhi, which leaked online in July 2019, along with other West songs. It appeared online incorrectly titled "Chakras" and in response to the leaks, Lopez issued a statement that leaked music jeopardizes "the essence of our collaborations, our crafts, and our livelihood". He further declared, "The leaking of music isn't for the fans or for the love of music; it's an invasion of privacy." At the time, it was reported by several outlets that Lopez was involved in the track's production. Reference tracks from British singer Dua Lipa for "Law of Attraction" were included among the leaks, although she and Ant Clemons remained off of Use This Gospel. Full versions of Dua Lipa performing on "Law of Attraction" were later leaked in October 2020. "Law of Attraction" was ultimately scrapped, being re-recorded as "Use This Gospel" for Jesus Is King.

== Release and promotion ==
"Use This Gospel" was released on October 25, 2019, as the tenth and penultimate track on West's ninth studio album Jesus Is King. However, it was originally slated to appear as the album's final track. During various promotional events for the album in late September 2019, West previewed the song. It was played as the final track of a listening event at the United Palace theater in the New York City neighborhood Washington Heights on September 29, for West's mini-tour Jesus Is King: A Kanye West Experience. The preview was interrupted after 10 p.m. by the New York City Police Department (NYPD), who used their authority to declare the show finished. West responded by pushing the NYPD out of his way, and finishing the song as he sang and hummed with the crowd.

On October 27, 2019, West performed the song with Clipse, Kenny G, and his gospel group the Sunday Service Choir for the group's concert at The Forum in Inglewood, California. West appeared on a raised platform during the concert and was backed by the Sunday Service Choir, who were dressed in white robes and led by Jason White. The stage was surrounded by a meadow setting on the arena floor, featuring plants and trees. Kenny G played his saxophone to open the performance as West watched him, drawing applause from both the Sunday Service Choir and the audience. Clipse embraced each other after No Malice delivered the final line of his verse, "Just hold on to your brother when his faith lost." Kenny G explained that the performance was not properly rehearsed, saying it "was so impromptu in some ways". He recalled that a "slight rehearsal" was done, but West is "very creative and on the spot just comes up with some super good ideas".

West accompanied the release of Jesus Is King with his concert film of the same name, which includes him humming a portion of the song in a cappella during the final scene. Kanye performs it as a lullaby to his son Psalm West as he cradles him to his chest, shown in a close-up shot. The rapper appears shirtless and his face is not visible, with only his hands and torso shown in the shot. On September 18, 2020, Kanye revealed via Twitter that "Use This Gospel" is his daughter North West's favorite song by him.

== Critical reception ==
"Use This Gospel" was met with generally positive reviews from music critics, with them mostly praising Clipse's appearance. Aaron McKrell from HipHopDX chose the song as the album's highlight, focusing on the "show-stealing" saxophone solo from Kenny G, "entrancing cries", and Clipse's reunion that is "heavy on duality"; he concluded by calling it both "enjoyable and frustrating" due to indicating "what the entire album could have been like had Ye dedicated more time to this creative space". Pitchfork's Rawiya Kameir believed the maximalism of Kanye West's previous "leather-skirt phase" covers the song's "expansive soundscape" and questioned if Kenny G's solo is "the 2019 equivalent of throwing Elton John onto a hook, just because you can", further branding "the inherent tension" between Clipse as the album's "most interesting moment" thematically. At NOW Magazine, Matthew Progress viewed it as a potential exception to the album's lackluster material, appreciating the "unprecedented reuniting" of Clipse and Kenny G's feature. Will Rosebury of Clash declared that the song features the duo's "long-awaited reunion" and saw it as "a magnificent crescendo to an album that feels like it's been meticulously composed". Journalist Greg Kot wrote for the Chicago Tribune that Clipse's verses are among Jesus Is King's main "musical sparks", noting West allows "message to trump musicality". The New York Times critic Jon Caramanica named the song an album standout, asserting that West's "prayerful singing" with vulnerability echoing his 2008 album 808s & Heartbreak sets up for the duo's "back-to-back verses", and the beginning features "a persistent, needling drone that bespeaks anxiety, disorientation and a pressing need for healing".

In The Independent, Roisin O'Connor highlighted Kenny G's "vibrant sax solo" and picked the song as one of the album's "few tracks that really hark back to West's older sounds", resembling his 2010 single "Power". Ross Horton similarly commented for The Line of Best Fit that it is one of the tracks to keep, observing how "the limitless, endless power" displayed on West's fifth studio album My Beautiful Dark Twisted Fantasy (2010) is evoked. He particularly noticed "how casually we get gifted a Kenny G sax solo, because it's Kanye West motherfucker, he does what he wants". Echoing this sentiment, Paste's Steven Edelstone considered if the solo is the only "memorable hook". In a lukewarm review at Entertainment Voice, Adi Mehta stated that West "sticks to relatively tradition prayer language", with "some more poetic lines" performed by No Malice. Mehta also thought Kenny G's appearance is possibly "the single oddest detail" of Jesus Is King, describing him as sounding like his true self by performing with "a passion that fits the spiritual focus" and affirming he makes the song "highly original". Ben Devlin expressed similar feelings in musicOMH; he called Clipse's reunion the album's "biggest spectacle" with their verses that "go over well", but saw West's "digitised vocal harmonies" as "a little clunky" and threatening to "overshadow the proceedings". Devlin also pointed out that Kenny G's solo may be "technically impressive", yet it is "glaringly unnecessary".

Some reviews were less positive. Joey Chini provided a mixed review of "Use This Gospel" for Exclaim!, highlighting West's delivery of the "great hook", though he complained that Clipse "are criminally underused" on their reunion and viewed Kenny G's "brilliant sax solo" as completely "isolated from the rest of the song". Dean Van Nguyen from The Guardian believed the reunion "promise[s] a beautiful subplot" to the album, describing the duo as "artistically reconciled" by Pusha T's trust "in West's vision" lining up with "No Malice's insistence that his music carries a positive message". However, he labeled the song "frustratingly undercooked" due to its basis of "some dinky keys and West's distorted hums that sound hastily synched by a loop pedal" and said Kenny G's "surprisingly simplistic" solo is "not helped by West", who shows a lack of depth about his personal struggle that inspired the album through certain lines. Entertainment Weekly's Brian Josephs depicted Clipse's reunion as highly "haphazard" and affirmed the verses "work well enough" due to their lyricism, but wrote that it is "mixed like they found really good gospel hums online" rather than "veterans making a song". Wren Graves of Consequence felt that the duo "temporarily impress", yet the moment of interest fails to "sustain over the [song's full] course".

== Commercial performance ==
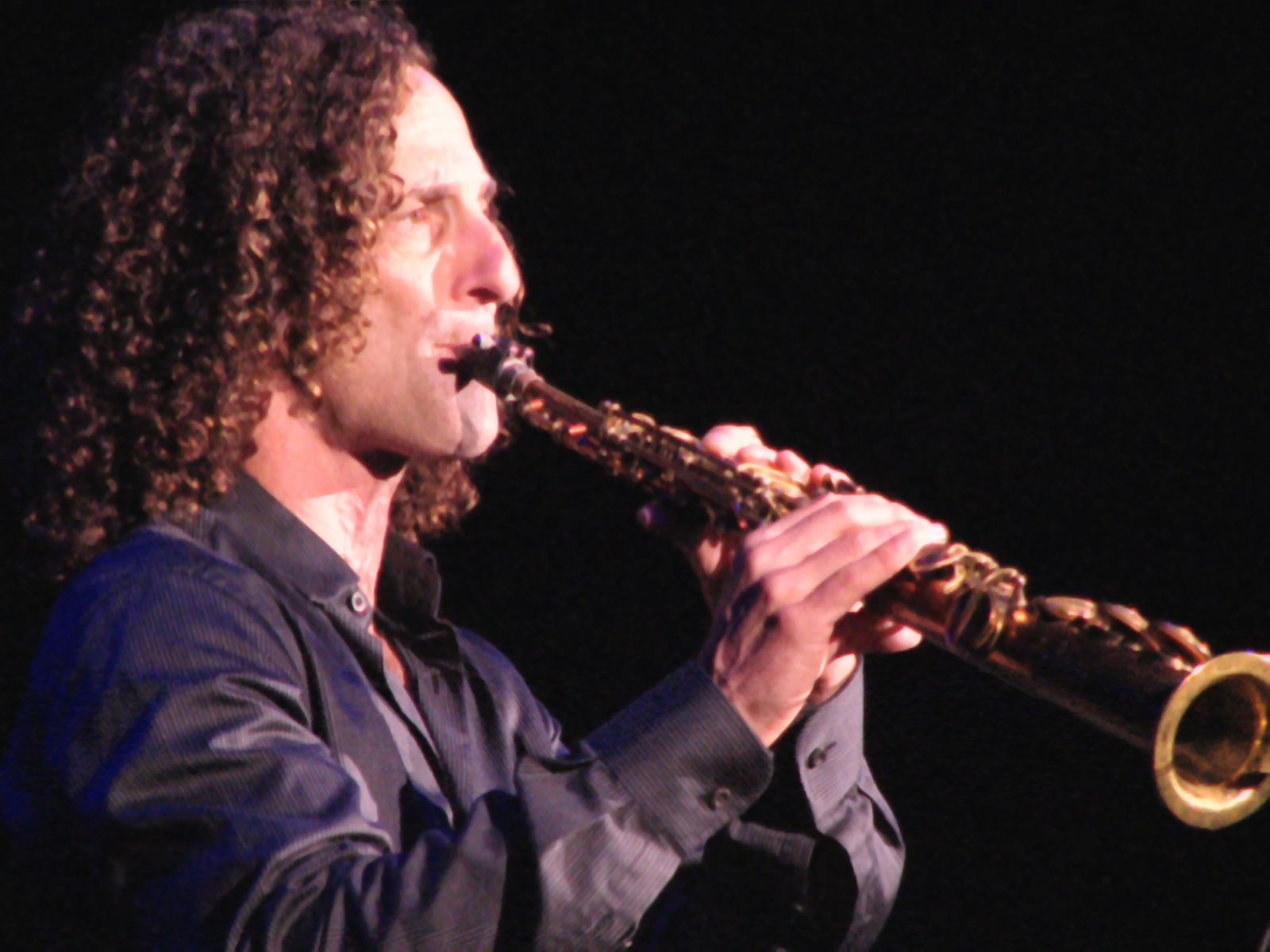
The song's debut at number 37 marked Kenny G's first entry on the US Billboard Hot 100 since 2000, making him one of the five acts to reach the top 40 of the chart every decade since the 1980s.

In the week of Jesus Is King's release, "Use This Gospel" entered the US Billboard Hot 100 at number 37, with 17.3 million streams. This gave Clipse their fifth track to chart on the Hot 100 and marked the duo's first entry since 2003. The song also gave Kenny G his 12th entry on the chart and his first since 2000, standing as his first top 40 hit of the 2010s decade. It led to him joining Michael Jackson, Madonna, U2, and "Weird Al" Yankovic as one of fives acts that charted in the top 40 of the Hot 100 in the 1980s, 1990s, 2000s, and 2010s.

The song further debuted at number seven on both the US Christian Songs and Gospel Songs charts, rounding out West's seven tracks that placed identically on those charts. In its second week on the former chart, the song rose to number six, while it climbed to number five on the Gospel Songs chart. The song eventually peaked at number three on the latter chart for the issue dated December 7, 2019. It entered the US Hot R&B/Hip-Hop Songs chart at number 20. The Recording Industry Association of America (RIAA) awarded a gold certification to "Use This Gospel" for amassing 500,000 certified units in the United States on March 22, 2022.

In Canada, the song debuted at number 34 on the Canadian Hot 100. It experienced similar success in Australia, reaching number 36 on the ARIA Singles Chart. "Use This Gospel" performed best in Latvia, where it peaked at number 24 on the Latvian Singles Chart. The song entered the Icelandic Singles Chart at number 32, while also reaching the top 50 in Denmark and Lithuania. It further appeared on the charts in Slovakia, Portugal, Sweden, and France.

== Credits and personnel ==
Credits for "Use This Gospel" adapted from Tidal and the BMI Repertoire.

- Kanye West – producer, songwriter
- Angel Lopez – producer, songwriter
- DrtWrk – producer, songwriter
- Federico Vindver – producer, songwriter
- Timbaland – producer, songwriter
- BoogzDaBeast – co-producer, songwriter
- Pi'erre Bourne – co-producer, songwriter
- Kenny G – songwriter, featured artist, saxophone
- No Malice – songwriter, featured artist (Note: As part of Clipse)
- Pusha T – songwriter, featured artist
- Derek Watkins – songwriter
- Matthew Leon – songwriter
- Rennard East – songwriter
- Mike Dean – mastering engineer, mixer
- Jess Jackson – mixer
- Andrew Drucker – recording engineer
- Josh Bales – recording engineer
- Josh Berg – recording engineer
- Randy Urbanski – recording engineer

== Remix ==
"Use This Gospel" (remix)

Song by DJ Khaled and Kanye West featuring Eminem

from the album God Did
- Released: August 26, 2022
- Genre: Gospel • Christian Rap
- Length: 3:44
- Label: We the Best; Epic
- Songwriters: Andre Young; Angel Lopez; Bernard Edwards; Dwayne Abernathy; Dawaun Parker; Darius Coleman; Derek Watkins; Erik Griggs; Federico Vindver; Gene Thornton; Jahmal Gwin; Jordan Timothy Jenks; Kanye West; Kenneth Bruce Gorelick; Marshall Mathers; Matthew Leon; Rennard East; Trevor Lawrence Jr.; Terrence Thornton; Timothy Mosley
- Producers: Dr. Dre; The ICU

On September 18, 2020, West announced a remix of the song by record producer Dr. Dre that features fellow rapper Eminem. West had previously announced Jesus Is King Part II in November 2019, a collaborative remix album by him and the producer. The rapper posted with the remix tweet that he had always loved and respected Eminem, expressing respect towards him for appearing on the song. The two of them had previously collaborated on the single "Forever" in 2009, alongside Drake and Lil Wayne. On August 23, 2022, DJ and record executive DJ Khaled revealed the track list for his thirteenth studio album God Did, including the remix. Three days later, the remix of "Use This Gospel" was released as the third track on the album.

In an interview with Lowe, Khaled revealed how the remix ended up on the album. He stated that West had played him Jesus Is King Part II in full a year and a half prior, calling it "incredible". Even though West and Khaled had recorded a couple of tracks for God Did, they were never finished due to the rapper's busy schedule. As part of a "last minute magic gift", Khaled asked West if he could include the remix on God Did since it perfectly fit the album's theme. According to Khaled, West loved the idea, which he joked "You know Ye don't love no idea". Before confirming the inclusion, West insisted on contacting both Dr. Dre and Eminem for their approval. On August 27, 2022, Khaled shared a video of West and Dr. Dre working on the song in the studio via Instagram, captioning it "produced by Dr. Dre my idol". The remix was produced by Dr. Dre and the ICU.

=== Composition and reception ===
Musically, the remix is a gospel track, with rock undertones. The song is reminiscent of Eminem's early 2000s work, though it features heavier drums. Eminem performs a fast-paced Christian rap verse on the remix, replacing Clipse's appearance on the original track. His verse is succeeded by a dubstep outro, contributed by Dr. Dre. Eminem expresses uncertainty about holding on, detailing combatting addiction and temptation while he has raised his daughters. The rapper also compares his controversies to West's, places his faith in "the Father", and thanks Jesus, concluding with: "Praises to Jesus, Allah ways (I'll always)."

For Rapzilla, Justin Sarachik declared that West and Eminem along with Dr. Dre's production on the remix created "a rather interesting song", highlighting Eminem's Christian verse for going against his usual style. Armon Sadler from Uproxx stated the remix has "an air of early 2000s Eminem nostalgia with harder-hitting drums" and moderate rock influence that he attributed to Dr. Dre, going on to assure the rapper's "usual speed raps and flow switches" are used for "a surprising effort as he makes several religious references". At Variety, Jem Aswad took particular interest in Eminem's verse for showing "a strong sense of faith" that is consistent with the message of both Jesus Is King and God Did. On a similar note for HotNewHipHop, Aron A. wrote that the rapper "carries the majority of the re[mix] on his shoulders". In a mixed review, Slant Magazine's Paul Attard noted Khaled's "genuinely exciting combo" of West and Eminem, but thought "he fails to push them out of their comfort zones", settling for Dr. Dre adding on "an outdated dubstep outro" and Eminem delivering "his usual agro-robotic flow". Ben Brutocao of HipHopDX found the remix to be among the album's complete "head-scratchers" and said that its mere existence is "baffling, but its placement on a DJ Khaled album (a devout Muslim) just defies all reason". He also complained that replacing Clipse with Eminem makes the song sound akin to a parody, "rather than an earnest showing of faith". Commercially, it peaked at number 49 on the US Billboard Hot 100. The remix further reached the top position on both the US Christian Songs and Gospel Songs charts, becoming the first number-one on these charts for both Khaled and Eminem. It also marked the first entry for both artists and West's fifth chart-topper on the two charts. It charted at numbers 55 and 77 on the Canadian Hot 100 and Billboard Global 200, respectively.

=== Credits and personnel ===
Credits adapted from Tidal.

- Kanye West – featured artist, lyricist, songwriter
- Eminem – featured artist, lyricist, songwriter
- Dr. Dre – producer, mixing engineer, songwriter
- Bernard Edwards Jr. – producer, songwriter (Note: As part of the ICU)
- Dwayne Abernathy Jr. – producer, songwriter
- Dawaun Parker – producer, songwriter
- Erik Griggs – producer, songwriter
- Trevor Lawrence Jr. – producer, songwriter
- Darius Coleman – lyricist, songwriter
- Derek Watkins – lyricist, songwriter
- Angel Lopez – songwriter
- Federico Vindver – songwriter
- Gene Thornton Jr. – songwriter
- Jahmal Gwin – songwriter
- Jordan Timothy Jenks – songwriter
- Kenneth Bruce Gorelick – songwriter
- Matthew Leon – songwriter
- Rennard East – songwriter
- Terrence Thornton – songwriter
- Timothy Mosley – songwriter
- Brian Gardner – mastering engineer
- Julio Ulloa – assistant engineer
- Lola A. Romero – recording engineer
- Quintin "Q" Gilkey – recording engineer
- Victor Luevanos – recording engineer

== Charts ==
=== Weekly charts ===
Chart performance for "Use This Gospel"
Chart (2019)	Peak position
Australia (ARIA)	36
Canada Hot 100 (Billboard)	34
Denmark (Tracklisten)	37
France (SNEP)	142
Iceland (Tónlistinn)	32
Latvia (LAIPA)	24
Lithuania (AGATA)	43
Portugal (AFP)	64
Slovakia Singles Digital (ČNS IFPI)	54
Sweden (Sverigetopplistan)	82
UK Hip Hop/R&B (Official Charts)	22
US Billboard Hot 100	37
US Hot Christian Songs (Billboard)	6
US Gospel Songs (Billboard)	3
US Hot R&B/Hip-Hop Songs (Billboard)	20
US Rolling Stone Top 100	11

Chart performance for "Use This Gospel (Remix)"
Chart (2022)	Peak position
Canada Hot 100 (Billboard)	55
Global 200 (Billboard)	77
New Zealand Hot Singles (RMNZ)	15
South Africa Streaming (TOSAC)	7
US Billboard Hot 100	49
US Hot Christian Songs (Billboard)	1
US Gospel Songs (Billboard)	1
US Hot R&B/Hip-Hop Songs (Billboard)	14

=== Year-end charts ===
2019 year-end chart performance for "Use This Gospel"
Chart (2019)	Position
US Christian Songs (Billboard)	49
US Gospel Songs (Billboard)	11

2020 year-end chart performance for "Use This Gospel"
Chart (2020)	Position
US Christian Songs (Billboard)	51
US Gospel Songs (Billboard)	6

== Certifications ==
Certifications and sales for "Use This Gospel"
Region	Certification	Certified units/sales
United States (RIAA)	Gold	500,000^{‡}
^{‡} Sales+streaming figures based on certification alone.
