= God Did =

2022 album by DJ Khaled

Studio album by DJ Khaled
- Released: August 26, 2022
- Recorded: 2021–2022
- Studio: We the Best
- Genres: Hip-hop; trap
- Length: 57:11
- Labels: We the Best; Epic
- Producers: Akachi; Tarik Azzouz; Charlie Coffeen; DJ Khaled; Dr. Dre; Sim Fane; Fridayy; Jake Fridkis; The ICU; Tay Keith; Rex Kudo; Jason Lader; LenyZ; Matty Spats; MightyMax; Nick Mira; Nyan; Aaron Paris; Preme; Rewined; Javar Rockamore; Sage; StreetRunner; Tim Suby; Dorien Theus; TM88; Troy Train

DJ Khaled chronology
Khaled Khaled (2021)	God Did (2022)	Aalam of God (2026)

Singles from God Did
- 1. "Staying Alive" Released: August 5, 2022; 2. "Big Time" Released: November 1, 2022

God Did is the thirteenth studio album by American disc jockey and record producer DJ Khaled. It was released on August 26, 2022, by We the Best Music Group and Epic Records. The project serves as the follow-up to his previous album, Khaled Khaled, released a year prior. It features guest appearances from Drake, Rick Ross, Lil Wayne, Jay-Z, John Legend, Fridayy, Kanye West, Eminem, Future, Lil Baby, Lil Durk, 21 Savage, Roddy Ricch, Quavo, Takeoff, SZA, Nardo Wick, Kodak Black, Don Toliver, Travis Scott, Gunna, Latto, City Girls, Skillibeng, Buju Banton, Capleton, Bounty Killer, Sizzla, Juice Wrld, Jadakiss, and Vory. Critics noted the music's maximalist production, which was primarily handled by Khaled himself, as well as by StreetRunner and Tarik Azzouz.

The album sees Khaled return to a more hip-hop-oriented approach, having courted pop prestige via features from Justin Bieber and Justin Timberlake among others on his previous album. One critic wrote that "[b]y returning to his hip-hop origins, DJ Khaled reasserts his position as rap's most well-connected figure, a testament to both his vivacious character and his boundless ingenuity." God Did was supported by two singles: the Drake and Lil Baby-assisted "Staying Alive", and the Future and Lil Baby-assisted "Big Time", the former of which was released exactly three weeks prior to the album. The record project was a commercial success, debuting at number one on the US Billboard 200 chart. The album received mixed reviews from critics. It earned five nominations at the 65th Annual Grammy Awards, including for Best Rap Album, and Song of the Year and Best Rap Song for the title track, featuring Rick Ross, Lil Wayne, Jay-Z, John Legend and Fridayy. On December 4, 2023, God Did was certified Gold by the Recording Industry Association of America (RIAA).

== Background ==
According to Khaled, the album thematizes the constant quest to relate to and praise a higher God for believing in him when others did not and he has been very open and proudly admitted to being a Muslim who habitually prays. "God has always told me to keep going; [...] When times get hard, I go harder. When times get great, I go even harder. I don't waste my emotions and energy on moving backwards. I use my energy to find the solution to keep going. If something ain't workin' out the way it's supposed to work out, [...] I want to find a way to get back up and keep going and find the solution."

== Songs ==
=== Tracks 1–5 ===
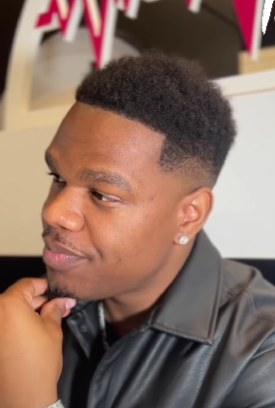
The album's title track served as record producer Fridayy's big break in the music industry

The album opens with "No Secret", featuring Drake, which is the first DJ Khaled-Drake collaboration that was not released as a single. Khaled had previously shared an Instagram post of the two of them in the studio together. Shifter Magazine called the track "a decent intro, although it may leave you wanting more at only 47 seconds." "No Secret" is followed by the album's title track, which features Rick Ross, Lil Wayne, Jay-Z, John Legend, and Fridayy. Fridayy had earlier posted about making the record "in the trenches on a $1000 set up" on Instagram. When Khaled was promoting the album he publicly thanked Jay-Z for his feature, calling him his idol. "God Did" begins with a spoken intro by DJ Khaled, followed by verses from Ross, Lil Wayne and Jay-Z addressing themes of praising God. Jay-Z's 4-minute-long verse details his journey from a drug dealer to a successful rapper who has helped build up other Black billionaires, "dissecting with deceptive complexity the drug war and criminal justice system". The song earned three nominations at the 65th Annual Grammy Awards for Song of the Year, Best Rap Song and Best Rap Performance. The song, whose refrain is sung by Fridayy, ends with a coda from Legend. The third song is "Use This Gospel" (remix; featuring Kanye West and Eminem), which remixes the original song by West from his ninth studio album, Jesus Is King (2019) and which was produced by Dr. Dre. The track marked the first time that Kanye and Eminem had collaborated since the 2009 single "Forever", which they performed alongside Drake and Lil Wayne. In an interview, Khaled revealed how the remix ended up on the album, stating that West had played him Jesus Is King Part II in full a year and a half prior, calling it "incredible". Even though West and Khaled had recorded a couple of tracks for God Did, they were never completed due to the West's busy schedule. As part of a "last minute magic gift", Khaled asked West if he could include the remix on God Did since it perfectly fit the album's theme. According to Khaled, West loved the idea, joking "You know Ye don't love no idea". Before confirming the inclusion, West contacted both Dr. Dre and Eminem for their approval. On August 27, 2022, Khaled shared a video of West and Dr. Dre working on the song in the studio via Instagram, captioning it "produced by Dr. Dre my idol". The song is a gospel track, with rock undertones. After verses from Eminem and West, the song concludes with a dubstep outro, contributed by Dr. Dre.

The record project's second single (released as such on November 1, 2022) and fourth track, "Big Time", features Future and Lil Baby. The track is a trap song that sees the two rappers boast about their cars and relationships whilst reminiscing on their difficult upbringings. Future's line "She went and tatted my name because I'm big time" refers to an incident in which American model and television personality Blac Chyna appeared in the music video for his song "Rich Sex" and consequently tattooed his name on her hand. After Chyna shared an image of the tattoo on social media, Future downplayed their relationship, claiming to be single. Chyna then had the tattoo removed. The next track, "Keep Going", features Lil Durk, 21 Savage, and Roddy Ricch. The title of the song comes from an ad-lib used by Khaled on his April 2021 track, "Every Chance I Get", which also featured Lil Durk in addition to Lil Baby. On "Keep Going", Lil Durk and 21 Savage provide the verses whilst Roddy Ricch sings the hook. HipHopDX called the song "five times more aggressive than most tracks on the album".

=== Tracks 6–10 ===
The sixth track of the album, "Party", features Quavo and Takeoff, who together constitute two-thirds of the hip-hop group Migos. It contains samples from "Party All the Time", written by Rick James, and performed by Eddie Murphy. Quavo performs the chorus and shares one verse with Takeoff, who performs all the verses and pre-choruses. LifeWithoutAndy wrote that in the song Khaled adopts the role of "the third Migo", proving that "good things also come in threes". The paper also noted that the song was part of "the more hip hop-focused part of the album, with the following cut "Staying Alive" ft. Drake and Lil Baby similarly planting its feet in the genre with ease." "Staying Alive", the album's lead single (released as such on August 5, 2022) and Khaled's first release of 2022, contains an interpolation of "Stayin' Alive" by the Bee Gees. The song opens with the chorus, in which Drake sings: "Try me a hundred times / Wanted me to lie, wanted me to cry, wanted me to die / Ah, ah, ah, I'm stayin' alive, I'm stayin' alive, I'm stayin' alive, I'm stayin' alive". Drake performs the first verse, while Lil Baby performs the second verse. The two rappers describe their lives with regard to their relationships and the challenges they overcame to be able to live a life of luxury. The song features "sharp hi-hats" in the production and is regarded as a midtempo track. Whilst the three artists had collaborated with each other on separate occasions, the song marked marks the first collaboration between all three on the same track. The song also marked Khaled's eighth collaboration with Drake and sixth with Lil Baby. The song peaked at No. 5 on the Billboard Hot 100 chart, earning Drake his 30th career top 5 hit. With this achievement Drake surpassed The Beatles (29) for the most of all time. Drake also became the first musician in history to reach 100 top 20 hits on the Hot 100 chart.

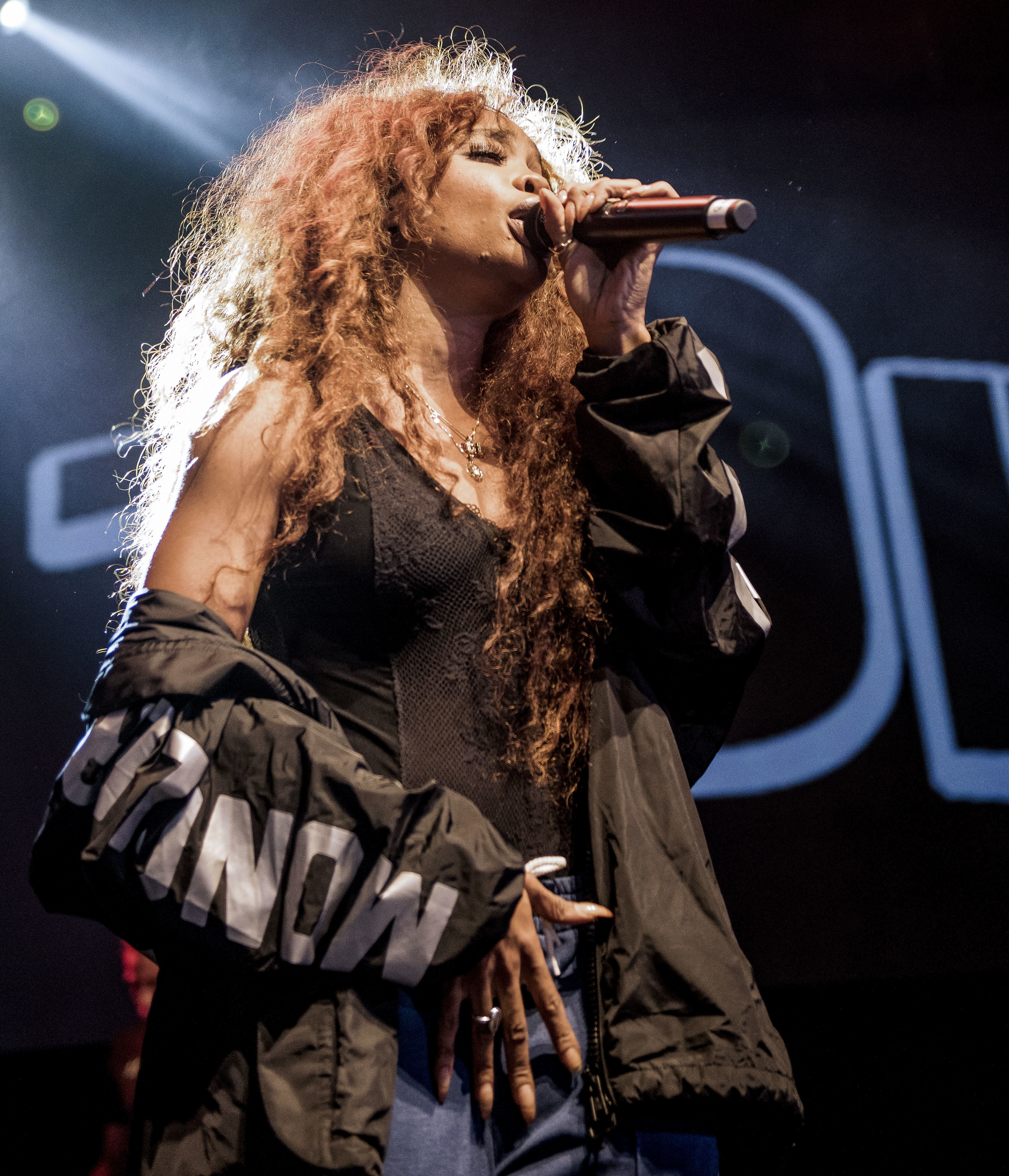
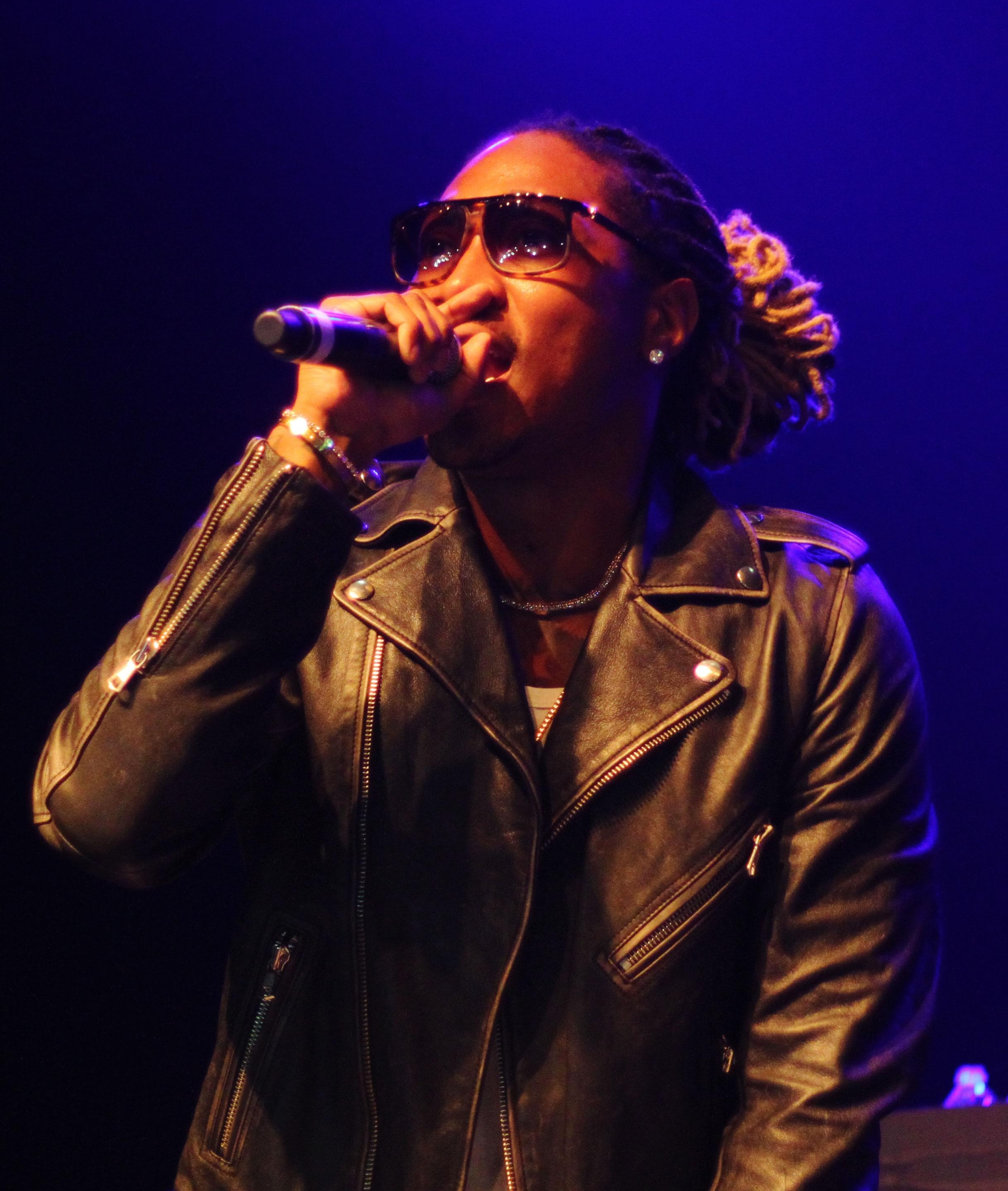
The song "Beautiful" marked SZA's second collaboration with DJ Khaled following their 2019 track, "Just Us", and her first with Future. The song was also the twentieth collaboration between Future and Khaled. Some of their most popular songs together include "Do You Mind" and "I Got the Keys" (both 2016)

"Beautiful" – featuring Future and SZA – is the eighth track of the record project. Considered one of the album's standouts along with "God Did", the track sees Future duet SZA, with the former singing the verses and the latter singing the choruses. HipHopDX's Ben Brutocao wrote that it "finds Future at his most compelling and likeable, with two excellent verses separated by a grand chorus from SZA." Redwood Bark wrote that the song allows the listener access to "the best of both the rap and R&B worlds" and complemented the pairing of the two artists. The next track, "It Ain't Safe", featuring Nardo Wick and Kodak Black, sees the latter take over from the former around the half-time mark. Genius described the song as "arguably the most trap song" on the album. Lyrically, the two rappers boast about their street activity, weaponry and jewellery over a "menacing instrumental". The track was the first time Nardo Wick had collaborated with either Kodak Black or DJ Khaled. The tenth song on God Did is entitled "Let's Pray", following the theme of worshipping God. It features Don Toliver and Travis Scott, the former of whom is signed to the latter's record label, Cactus Jack Records, in a joint venture with Atlantic Records. Don Toliver – who had never before worked with Khaled – provides the song's first verse and the hook whilst his label boss raps the second verse. Whilst Scott discusses the topic of guns and partying, Don Toliver sings on the subject of the album's religious themes. Shifter Magazine called the song a "[banger]" and HipHop24x7 wrote that it was one of "a number of hits".

=== Tracks 11–14 ===
God Did's eleventh track is entitled "Fam Good, We Good" and features Gunna and Roddy Ricch for his second appearance on the album. The song previously leaked in full on July 25, 2022, a month before the release of the whole record project. It sees Roddy Ricch and Gunna taking pride in their wealth and reassuring their families of their financial positions over a celebratory instrumental. Ricch also calls for the freedom of Young Thug. Whilst some critics received the song positively, with one writing that it demonstrated "Khaled's affinity for the [hip-hop] genre", Pitchfork opined that the two rappers "[sound] bored by the time they reach the chorus". The next song is "Bills Paid", featuring Latto and City Girls (which is composed of Yung Miami and JT). The only all-female track on the album, it contains samples from "Lights, Camera, Action!" – written by Terrance Kelly and performed by Mr. Cheeks – and sees the artists describe their high expectations for life and their sexual experiences with men. The song is the third official collaborative song between Latto and City Girls, the second collaboration between Latto and DJ Khaled (after the 2022 remix of Latto's "Big Energy") and the first collab between City Girls and Khaled. Pitchfork noted that putting "Latto and City Girls on the same track" was a "winning idea" but also wrote that "their verses are cordoned off from each other". However, HotNewHipHop wrote that "there's no denying that Latto, JT & Yung Miami refused to be outshined by anyone and delivered a dynamic, old school-inflected track which has some of the highest replay value of any song on the record." Mic Cheque called the song "better than most of the rappers' solo records".

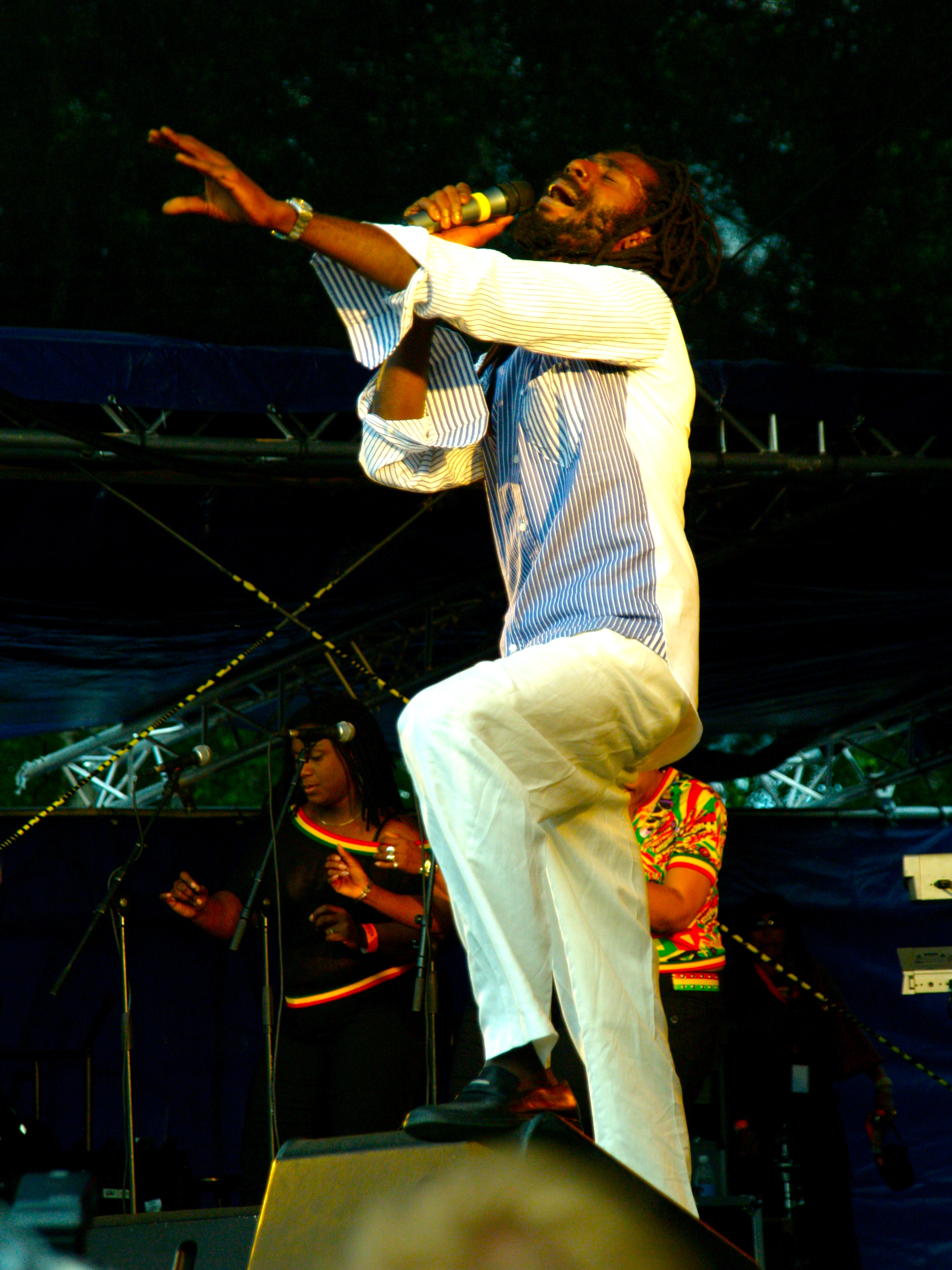
Buju Banton was the foremost singer on the hook of the album's fourteenth track, "These Streets Know My Name"

The album's thirteenth song, "Way Past Luck", features 21 Savage for his second appearance on the LP and his fourth collaboration with Khaled. The song, which samples "All This" (performed by Barbara Jean), sees 21 Savage discuss record labels, his personal life and his street life. The rapper was commended for his lyricism on the track. HipHopDX wrote that it was a "highlight" which "displays 21 Savage's effortless talent to carry a song like he's facing a full squad by himself on Call of Duty search & destroy. He deftly surfs on a sample dug from the crates of the seraphim." The fourteenth track, "These Streets Know My Name", features Skillibeng, Buju Banton, Capleton, Bounty Killer and Sizzla, collectively described by Slant Magazine as "a small team of Jamaican dancehall legends". Previously, dancehall tracks on DJ Khaled albums have included "Where You Come From" (Khaled Khaled), "Holy Mountain" (Father of Asahd) and "Progress" (Major Key). The song contains verses contributed to by all of the artists and the hook is provided by Buju Banton, Skillibeng and Capleton. Lyrically, all five artists express their loyalty to their home country of Jamaica. Discussing the song before the release of the accompanying music video, Khaled said: "The record's phenomenal, the video's done. Just who I got on it all together is kinda like impossible. Like, real talk, like, it's really impossible. And when you hear it and you come from that, they'll be like, 'I ain't never seen that'. The record's crazy too, and I'm very proud of it because, I never forget about my roots. I'm a sound killer, I kill sound."

=== Tracks 15–18 ===
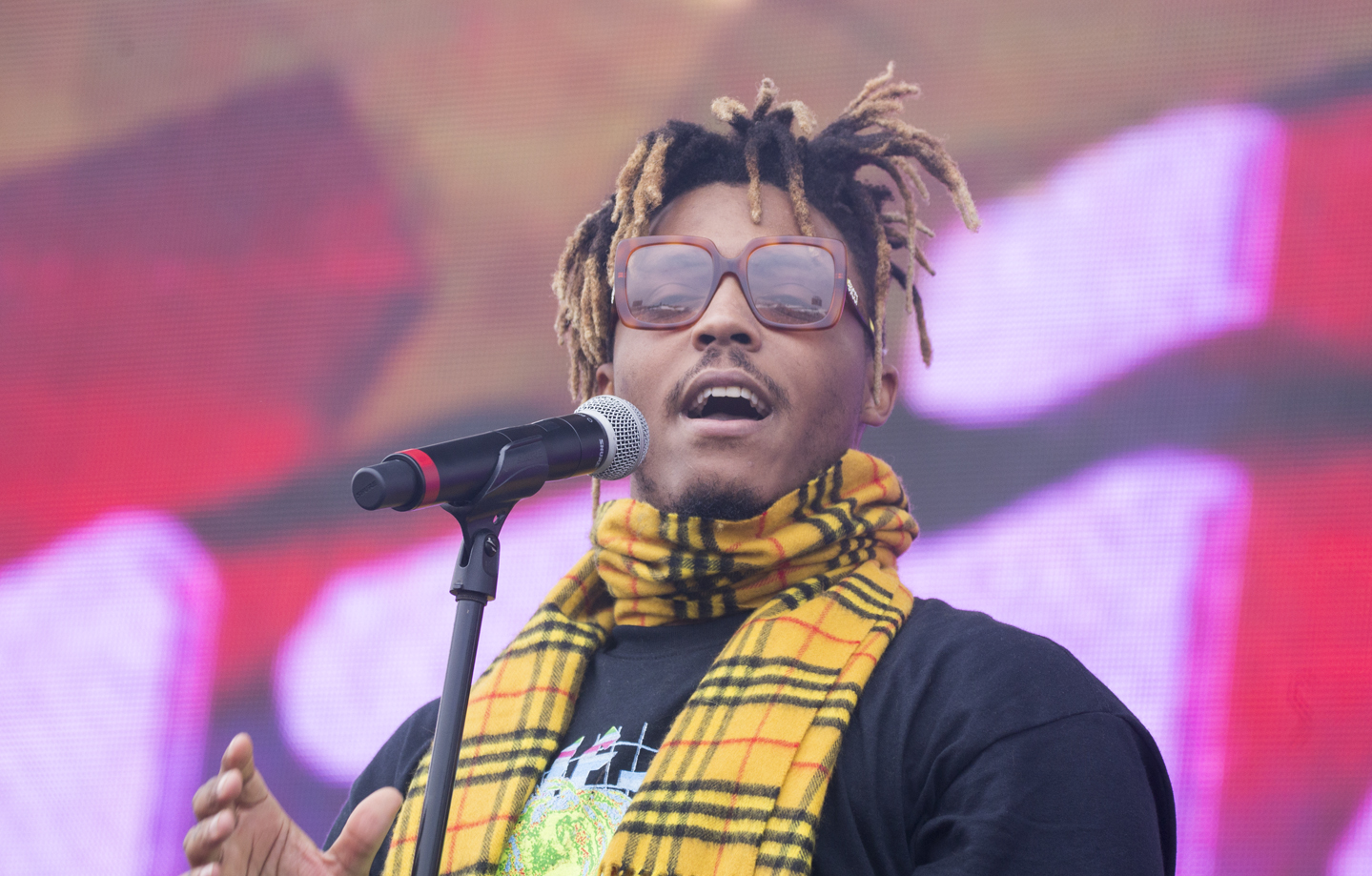
DJ Khaled recounted that he was pleasantly taken by surprise by Juice Wrld's decision to record a song about him.

On the album's fifteenth track, "Juice Wrld Did", Juice Wrld likens his riches and accomplishments to those of DJ Khaled, playfully singing: "DJ Khaled with them straps, I got another one, uh-huh (On God) / DJ Khaled, a hundred racks, I made another one, uh-huh (On God) / DJ Khaled with the tats, I got another one, uh-huh (On God) / DJ Khaled, we the best, bitch, I'm number one, uh-huh (Let's go, let's go, let's go, let's go, let's go)". Throughout the song, Juice Wrld mentions several catchphrases used by Khaled, including 'we the best' and 'another one'. The song, which marks the first collaboration between the two artists, was initially previewed on February 6, 2019, through No Limit Maneski's Instagram live, before featuring a full-length leak on June 19, 2020, and finally releasing with the rest of the album on August 26, 2022. Produced by Nick Mira and DT of Internet Money Records and written independently of Khaled, the song was offered to him after Juice Wrld's death. In an interview with Jay-Z, Khaled shared that he chose to add the song to his album as a tribute to Juice Wrld after the late rapper's manager Lil Bibby reached out to him and advocated for its inclusion in God Did. The song was received positively, with Andy Kellman of AllMusic stating that the song's "bittersweet quality is strongest when Juice, who died in 2019, declares himself rookie of the year." HipHopDX wrote that ""Juice Wrld Did" is one of the most natural posthumous tracks this year, and reminds everyone that we lost a generational talent, which is a reminder that no one needed, but everyone could use."

The next song, "Jadakiss Interlude" (featuring Jadakiss) sees the New York rapper rap over a beat produced with the aid of a sample from "New York" – which was written by Ja Rule, Fat Joe, Cool & Dre, KRS-One, and Jadakiss and was performed by Ja Rule, featuring Fat Joe and Jadakiss – as well as an additional sample from "Down and Out in New York City", performed by James Brown. The record is an example of Khaled's focused approach to interludes, as can also be seen in the track "Jermaine's Interlude" (featuring J. Cole) from Major Key. Jadakiss and Khaled have collaborated many times previous to this record, working together on songs including "Never Surrender" (Suffering from Success) and the remix to "All I Do Is Win" (whose original mix appeared on the album Victory). Pitchfork had a positive reaction to the song, noting that "the shouts of the crowd invigorate" it. The penultimate track, "Asahd and Aalam Cloth Talk" is a twenty-second interlude which includes spoken word from Khaled himself "along with his two sons, Asahd and Aalam Khaled, who echo their father's mantra and the title of the album." "The three received writing credits along with Khaled's wife and the children's mother, Nicole Tuck." The song is the only one on the album to not feature any artists. The eighteenth and final song, "Grateful" (featuring Vory), contains samples from "Let the Blessings Flow", performed by Nancy Grandquist. It serves as a conclusion to the album in much the same way as "No Secret" served as its opening. The song shares the same name as Khaled's chart-topping tenth studio album. LifeWithoutAndy wrote that the song was "most definitely a love letter to the soul genre, with a euphoric sample and church-reminiscent keys crafting a mood bubbling with feeling and optimism, an apt summary for Khaled's music as a whole."

== Packaging and promotion ==
On July 6, 2022, Khaled announced the title of the album, which comes from a self-affirming mantra that he frequently uses: "They didn't believe in us, God did!" On August 2, 2022, Khaled announced the release date of the album as part of the same announcement for its lead single, "Staying Alive", which features Canadian rapper and singer Drake and American rapper Lil Baby. "Staying Alive" was released three days later on August 5, 2022. On August 22, 2022, Khaled revealed the cover art, which depicts Khaled looking to the sky while a tear runs down his right cheek in an image shot by Lougè. Khaled explained that "[t]he tear represents tears of joy from God's blessings GOD, I LOVE U SO MUCH! ... I'm grateful for anything and EVERYTHING. Thank you god for blessing my family, my friends and my fans. When nobody believed, YOU DID! I praise you daily. We're here to do GOD'S WORK!!" The following day, he revealed the tracklist of the album. On August 24, in an interview with Billboard, Khaled stated that he had allowed American rapper Jay-Z, a close friend and frequent collaborator of his, to choose the album cover from two options. Khaled released music videos for the songs "Party", "These Streets Know My Name", "Keep Going", "Big Time", "It Ain't Safe", "Staying Alive", "Jadakiss Interlude", "Way Past Luck" and "Beautiful".

== Critical reception ==
Professional ratings
Aggregate scores
Source	Rating
Metacritic	43/100
Review scores
Source	Rating
AllMusic	2/5 stars
Clash	4.0/10
HipHop24x7	9.3/10
HipHopDX	3.3/5 stars
Pitchfork	4/10
Slant Magazine	1.5/5 stars

God Did received polarised reviews from critics. HipHopDX called the album "an unexpectedly, confusingly good collection of rap songs". The magazine also praised the album as "one of the most well constructed albums the 46-year-old record executive has ever released". It reserved special praise for the tracks "Party", "Beautiful", "Way Past Luck" and "Juice Wrld Did". Mic Cheque wrote that the album was "DJ Khaled's best offering since 2016's Major Key", noting that many of the songs were "strong enough to be lead singles for the guest artists' own albums". Clash called the album "incredibly entertaining". One critic stated: "Clocking in at a total of 57 minutes long, the new offering from the 'I'm The One' producer is quintessential Khaled: laid back, soulful, hard-hitting and infectious. ... It's definitely in the running for hip hop album of the year, and a standout amongst Khaled's long-spanning discography." In particular, Jay-Z's performance on the track "God Did" received critical acclaim. Simon Vozick-Levinson of Rolling Stone called the verse "a master class in mature lyricism", while Complex wrote that "the long-teased verse is a reminder that he's still an exceptional writer" and that "this verse will definitely go down among Jay-Z's best". An Ambrosia For Heads article called Jay-Z's verse the best verse of 2022. The project earned five nominations at the 65th Annual Grammy Awards, including for Best Rap Album, and Song of the Year and Best Rap Song for the title track.

However, Clash also called the album a "bombastic return from the hip-hop high-roller". Dani Blum of Pitchfork described the project as a "bogged-down album" in which "some of the album's most appealing melodies and hooks seem more incidental than intentional, the logical outcome of combining stars and beats, then backing away". Blum characterized DJ Khaled as incompetent to harness "the power of collaboration to push artists beyond their comfort zones", with the exception of the title track with Jay-Z, which was praised as "ambitious". On Metacritic, based on 6 reviews, the album received a score of 43, the lowest of Khaled's career.

== Commercial performance ==
God Did debuted at number one on the US Billboard 200 chart, earning 107,500 album-equivalent units (including 9,500 copies in pure album sales) in its first week. On December 4, 2023, the record project was certified Gold by the Recording Industry Association of America (RIAA). From the record project, "Staying Alive" (5), "God Did" (17), "Beautiful" (29), "Big Time" (31), "Use This Gospel" (remix) (49), "Juice Wrld Did" (55), "Keep Going" (57), "Party" (66), "It Ain't Safe" (77), "No Secret" (78) and "Let's Pray" (86) all charted within the Billboard Hot 100. "Way Past Luck" (5), "Bills Paid" (6) and "Fam Good, We Good" (9) all charted within the Bubbling Under Hot 100. On March 17, 2023, "God Did" achieved Gold certification from the Recording Industry Association of America (RIAA). On August 4, 2023, "Staying Alive" achieved Platinum certification from the Recording Industry Association of America (RIAA).

== Track listing ==
God Did track listing
No.	Title	Writer(s)	Producer(s)	Length
1.	"No Secret" (featuring Drake)	Khaled Khaled; Aubrey Graham; D. Church; Raynford Humphrey; Masamune Kudo; Jason Lader; Charlie Coffeen; Sim Fane; Aaron Paris; Matthew Spatola; Jake Fridkis; Sam Lawalata; Reece Weinberg	Preme; Rex Kudo; Lader; Coffeen; Fane; Paris; Matty Spats; Fridkis; Rewined	0:47
2.	"God Did" (featuring Rick Ross, Lil Wayne, Jay-Z, John Legend, and Fridayy)	Khaled; William Roberts; Dwayne Carter; Shawn Carter; John Stephens; Francis LeBlanc; Edward Blackmon; Nicholas Warwar; Tarik Azzouz	DJ Khaled; Fridayy; StreetRunner; Azzouz	8:21
3.	"Use This Gospel" (remix featuring Kanye West and Eminem)	Khaled; Kanye West; Marshall Mathers; Timothy Mosley; Terrence Thornton; Rennard East; Derek Watkins; Gene Thornton Jr.; Kenneth Gorelick; Jahmal Gwin; Matthew Leon; Angel Lopez; Jordan Jenks; Federico Vindver; Darius Coleman; Andre Young; Dawaun Parker; Denaun Porter; Bernard Edwards Jr.; Dwayne Abernathy Jr.; Trevor Lawrence Jr.; Eric Griggs; Michael Suski; S. Jordan	Dr. Dre; the ICU	3:43
4.	"Big Time" (featuring Future and Lil Baby)	Khaled; Nayvadius Wilburn; Dominique Jones; Bryan Simmons	DJ Khaled; TM88	2:53
5.	"Keep Going" (featuring Lil Durk, 21 Savage, and Roddy Ricch)	Khaled; Shéyaa Abraham-Joseph; Rodrick Moore; Simmons	DJ Khaled; TM88; Akachi	3:04
6.	"Party" (featuring Quavo and Takeoff)	Khaled; Quavious Marshall; Kirshnik Ball; James Johnson; Warwar; Azzouz	DJ Khaled; StreetRunner; Azzouz	3:31
7.	"Staying Alive" (featuring Drake and Lil Baby)	Khaled; Graham; Jones; Nyan Lieberthal; Timothy Suby; Barry Gibb; Robin Gibb; Maurice Gibb	Nyan; Tim Suby	2:58
8.	"Beautiful" (featuring Future and SZA)	Khaled; Wilburn; Solána Rowe; Simmons	DJ Khaled; TM88	3:43
9.	"It Ain't Safe" (featuring Nardo Wick and Kodak Black)	Khaled; Horace Walls III; Bill Kapri; Brytavious Chambers	DJ Khaled; Tay Keith	2:50
10.	"Let's Pray" (featuring Don Toliver and Travis Scott)	Khaled; Caleb Toliver; Jacques Webster; Chambers; Mike Dean; Alexander Monro; Pepijn Baltus	DJ Khaled; Tay Keith; Dean^{[a]}; Eza^{[a]}; Duce^{[a]}	2:38
11.	"Fam Good, We Good" (featuring Gunna and Roddy Ricch)	Khaled; Sergio Kitchens; Moore; Tavoris Hollins Jr.; Azzouz; Maxime Breton	DJ Khaled; StreetRunner; Azzouz; MightyMax	3:04
12.	"Bills Paid" (featuring Latto and City Girls)	K. Khaled; Alyssa Stephens; Jatavia Johnson; Caresha Brownlee; Frank Wilson; Anita Poree; Leonard Caston; Warwar; Azzouz; Sage Skolfield; Caleb Mclean; Derrick Milano; Javar Rockamore	DJ Khaled; StreetRunner; Azzouz; Sage; Rockamore; Troy Train	3:28
13.	"Way Past Luck" (featuring 21 Savage)	Khaled; Abraham-Joseph; L. Benard; Les Ledo; Warwar; Azzouz	DJ Khaled; StreetRunner; Azzouz; LenyZ	2:16
14.	"These Streets Know My Name" (featuring Skillibeng, Buju Banton, Capleton, Bounty Killer, and Sizzla)	Khaled; Emwah Warmington; Mark Myrie; Clifton Bailey III; Rodney Price; Miguel Collins; M. Thompson; Warwar; Azzouz	DJ Khaled; StreetRunner; Azzouz	4:59
15.	"Juice Wrld Did" (featuring Juice Wrld)	Khaled; Jarad Higgins; Nick Mira; Dorien Theus	Mira; Theus	3:27
16.	"Jadakiss Interlude" (featuring Jadakiss)	Khaled; Jason Phillips; Jeffrey Atkins; Joseph Cartagena; Marcello Valenzano; André Lyon; Lawrence Parker; Barry De Vorzon; Bodie Chandler; Warwar; Azzouz	DJ Khaled; StreetRunner; Azzouz	2:52
17.	"Asahd and Aalam Cloth Talk"			0:20
18.	"Grateful" (featuring Vory)	Khaled; Hollins; Nancy Grandquist; Warwar; Azzouz	DJ Khaled; StreetRunner; Azzouz	2:07
Total length:				57:11

=== Notes ===
- Track titles are stylized in all caps with the exception of "Juice Wrld Did", which is stylized as "Juice WRLD DID".
- ^{^[a]} signifies a co-producer.

=== Sample credits ===
- "Staying Alive" contains samples from the similarly titled "Stayin' Alive", written by Barry Gibb, Robin Gibb, and Maurice Gibb, and performed by the Bee Gees.
- "Party" contains samples from "Party All the Time", written by Rick James, and performed by Eddie Murphy.
- "Bills Paid" contains samples from "Lights, Camera, Action!" written by Terrance Kelly and performed by Mr. Cheeks
- "Way Past Luck" contains samples from "All This", performed by Barbara Jean.
- "Jadakiss Interlude" contains samples from "New York", written by Ja Rule, Fat Joe, Cool & Dre, KRS-One, and Jadakiss, and performed by Ja Rule, featuring Fat Joe, and Jadakiss, as well as "Down and Out in New York City", performed by James Brown.
- "Grateful" contains samples from "Let the Blessings Flow", performed by Nancy Grandquist.

== Personnel ==
Credits adapted from Tidal.

- Chris Athens – mastering (tracks 1, 2, 4–18)
- AyoJuan – engineering (1, 2, 4–9, 11–16, 18)
- Harrison Holmes – engineering assistance (1, 2, 4–6, 8–18)
- Kurt Bradley – engineering assistance (1, 2, 4–6, 8–18)
- 40 – mixing (1, 7)
- Noel Cadastre – engineering (1, 7)
- Rex Kudo – keyboards, programming (1)
- Aaron Paris – synthesizer, violin (1)
- DJ Khaled – orchestration, vocal arrangement (2, 4–6, 8–14, 16); engineering (17)
- Manny Marroquin – mixing (2, 4–6, 8–18)
- Jeremie Inhaber – mixing (16–18), engineering assistance (2, 4–6, 8–15)
- Anthony Vilchis – engineering assistance (2, 4–6, 8–18)
- Chris Galland – engineering assistance (2, 4–6, 8–18)
- Zach Pereyra – engineering assistance (2, 4–6, 8–18)
- MightyMax – guitar (2, 18)
- EMix – engineering (2)
- Fridayy – engineering (2)
- Young Guru – engineering (2)
- Lil Wayne – engineering (2)
- Tim McClain – engineering (2)
- Dr. Dre – mixing (3)
- Lola A. Romero – engineering (3)
- Mike Strange – engineering (3)
- Quentin "Q" Gilke – engineering (3)
- Victor Luevanos – engineering (3)
- Julio Ulloa – engineering assistance (3)
- Brian "Big Bass" Gardner – mastering (3)
- Mattazik Muzik – engineering (4)
- Brian Cruz – engineering (5, 13)
- Daryl McPherson – engineering (6)
- Nyan Lieberthal – drums, keyboards (7)
- Tim Suby – keyboards (7)
- Dyryk – engineering (9)
- MBW – engineering (9)
- Chris Dennis – engineering (11)
- Flo Ongonga – engineering (11)
- Soundsfrommikey – engineering (12)
- Joey Galvan – engineering (12)
- Troy Train – engineering (12)
- Tyler Crawford Unland – engineering (12)
- Tekktronik – engineering (14)
- PantaSon – engineering (14)
- Max Lord – engineering (15)
- Dayzel the Machine – engineering (16)

== Charts ==
=== Weekly charts ===
Weekly chart performance for God Did
Chart (2022)	Peak position
Australian Albums (ARIA)	9
Austrian Albums (Ö3 Austria)	11
Belgian Albums (Ultratop Flanders)	16
Belgian Albums (Ultratop Wallonia)	32
Canadian Albums (Billboard)	1
Czech Albums (ČNS IFPI)	21
Danish Albums (Hitlisten)	8
Dutch Albums (Album Top 100)	10
Finnish Albums (Suomen virallinen lista)	30
French Albums (SNEP)	30
German Albums (Offizielle Top 100)	15
Irish Albums (Official Charts)	16
Italian Albums (FIMI)	21
Japanese Digital Albums (Oricon)	40
Lithuanian Albums (AGATA)	27
New Zealand Albums (RMNZ)	4
Nigeria Albums (TurnTable)	36
Norwegian Albums (VG-lista)	4
Slovak Albums (ČNS IFPI)	9
Spanish Albums (Promusicae)	55
Swedish Albums (Sverigetopplistan)	23
Swiss Albums (Schweizer Hitparade)	7
UK Albums (Official Charts)	4
UK R&B Albums (Official Charts)	9
US Billboard 200	1
US Top R&B/Hip-Hop Albums (Billboard)	1

=== Year-end charts ===
2022 year-end chart performance for God Did
Chart (2022)	Position
US Billboard 200	170
US Top R&B/Hip-Hop Albums (Billboard)	58

== Certifications ==
Certifications and sales for God Did
Region	Certification	Certified units/sales
United States (RIAA)	Gold	500,000^{‡}
^{‡} Sales+streaming figures based on certification alone.
