= Forever (Lil Baby song) =

2022 song by Lil Baby featuring Fridayy

Song by Lil Baby featuring Fridayy

from the album It's Only Me
- Released: October 14, 2022
- Genre: Emo rap
- Length: 2:47
- Label: Quality Control; Motown
- Songwriters: Dominique Jones; Tavoris Hollins; Francis LeBlanc; Andre Robertson; Rodney Montreal
- Producers: Fridayy; Bizness Boi; Fortune

"Forever" is a song by American rapper and singer Lil Baby featuring American singer Fridayy, from the former's third studio album It's Only Me (2022). It was written by the artists alongside Vory, Bizness Boi, and Fortune, the latter two producing it with Fridayy. The song peaked at number 8 on the Billboard Hot 100.

== Composition ==
"Forever" contains an R&B-style crooned hook from Fridayy, and has been described as a love song.

== Critical reception ==
Shanté Collier-McDermott of Clash praised Fridayy's guest appearance, writing, "his uniquely toned vocals framing a deep love song." Likewise, Carl Lamarre of Billboard said, "I also am a fan of Fridayy's hook capabilities, as the pairing of him and Baby on 'Forever' is a winner for me."

== Charts ==
=== Weekly charts ===
Weekly chart performance for "Forever"
Chart (2022–2023)	Peak position
Canada Hot 100 (Billboard)	61
Global 200 (Billboard)	23
Ireland (IRMA)	80
South Africa Streaming (TOSAC)	22
UK Singles (OCC)	43
US Billboard Hot 100	8
US Hot R&B/Hip-Hop Songs (Billboard)	3
US Rhythmic Airplay (Billboard)	17

=== Year-end charts ===
Year-end chart performance for "Forever"
Chart (2023)	Position
US Hot R&B/Hip-Hop Songs (Billboard)	55

== Certifications ==
Certifications for "Forever"
Region	Certification	Certified units/sales
United States (RIAA)	Platinum	1,000,000^{‡}
^{‡} Sales+streaming figures based on certification alone.
