= When It Comes to You (Fridayy song) =

Single by Fridayy

from the album Fridayy
- Released: 21 July 2023
- Genre: R&B
- Length: 2:48
- Label: Def Jam
- Songwriter: Fridayy
- Producers: Fridayy; Kvrim; Kofo; Aidan Brody

Fridayy singles chronology
"Don't Give It Away" (2023)	"When It Comes to You" (2023)	"I Pray" (2024)

"When It Comes to You" is a song by Haitian-American singer-songwriter Fridayy, released as a single on 21 July 2023. It charted on the Billboard Hot 100 and Hot R&B/Hip-Hop Songs charts. According to Rated R&B, on the song, “Fridayy recounts a time when he was in a deep emotional abyss and shares how his significant other helped him out of it, which showed him what true love is”.

== Background and release ==
On July 21, 2023, "When It Comes to You" was released officially under Def Jam Recordings, preceding Fridayy's performance at the 2023 BET Soul Train Awards. The song was produced by Fridayy, KVRIM, Kofo and Aidan Brody. The official music video for the song, directed by Dragan Andic, was released the same day.

== Charts ==
=== Weekly charts ===
Weekly chart performance for "When It Comes to You"
Chart (2024)	Peak position
US Billboard Hot 100	97
US Hot R&B/Hip-Hop Songs (Billboard)	29
US Rhythmic (Billboard)	38

=== Year-end charts ===
2024 year-end chart performance for "When It Comes to You"
Chart (2024)	Position
US Hot R&B/Hip-Hop Songs (Billboard)	84

== Certifications ==
Certifications for "When It Comes to You"
Region	Certification	Certified units/sales
United States (RIAA)	Platinum	1,000,000^{‡}
^{‡} Sales+streaming figures based on certification alone.
