= God Did (song) =

2022 song by DJ Khaled

Song by DJ Khaled featuring Rick Ross, Lil Wayne, Jay-Z, John Legend and Fridayy

from the album God Did
- Released: August 25, 2022
- Length: 8:21
- Label: We the Best; Epic
- Songwriters: Khaled Khaled; William Roberts III; Dwayne Carter, Jr.; Shawn Carter; John Stephens; Francis LeBlanc; E. Blackmon; Nicholas Warwar; Tarik Azzouz
- Producers: DJ Khaled; Fridayy; StreetRunner; H. Amarr; Azzouz

"God Did" is a song by American musician DJ Khaled, released as the title track from the former's thirteenth studio album of the same name on the 25th of August, 2022. The song features vocal contributions from fellow American musicians Rick Ross, Lil Wayne, Jay-Z, John Legend, and Fridayy. The production was handled by Khaled, Fridayy, StreetRunner, H. Amarr, and Azzouz. The song was positively received by critics, who especially praised Jay-Z's verse on the track.

Despite not being released as a single, the song would go on to chart at number 17 on the Billboard Hot 100, number 6 on the Hot R&B/Hip-Hop Songs chart, and number 3 on the Hot Rap Songs chart, alongside charting in 3 other countries (Canada, New Zealand, and the United Kingdom) and on the Billboard Global 200. The song also earned three nominations at the 65th Annual Grammy Awards, for Song of the Year, Best Rap Song, and Best Rap Performance, although it did not win in any of the categories.

== Content ==
"God Did" begins with a spoken intro by DJ Khaled, who addresses the people who did not believe in him. In the first verse, Rick Ross dismisses his haters, hinting that some work for the IRS; then Lil Wayne praises God for making him so influential.

Jay-Z then raps for the next four minutes, detailing his journey from a drug dealer to a successful rapper who has helped build up other Black billionaires, and "dissecting with deceptive complexity the drug war and criminal justice system".

== Critical reception ==
The song was met with a generally positive reception from music critics, many of whom praised Jay-Z's verse in particular.

Writing for AllMusic, Andy Kellman commented, "'God Did" starts off with conventional, half-preening/half-motivational Khaled-speak and standard fare from Rick Ross and Lil Wayne." Regarding Jay-Z's feature, he wrote that he "astounds with an extended verse" and raps "not without showing off a bit, emphasizing his high standing by modifying the title to 'Hov did.'", before adding, "The acuity, wit, and virtuosity command rapt attention."

Paul Attard of Slant Magazine wrote a more critical response toward the song, criticizing Khaled's "maximalist approach" to production: "But never has this rung truer than on 'God Did,' where a spry Jay-Z delivering a mellifluous four-minute verse apparently isn't enough for Khaled. He also tacks on Rick Ross, Lil Wayne, and John Legend, which bloats the track beyond its breaking point, as you feel every last second of its laborious eight-minute-length drag by."

Ben Brutocao of HipHopDX wrote that the song "collects 75 percent of a Rick Ross verse, an excellent Lil Wayne verse, and five or six JAY-Z verses into a rain barrel made of three piano keys, an autotuned chorus made in Fridayy's bedroom and a stodgy drumline that gets so bored over the 8-minute runtime that it only deigns to be there for about 60 percent of it."

Dani Blum of Pitchfork had a mostly favorable reaction toward the song, only directing criticism toward the length of the Jay-Z verse: "'God Did' is an eight-and-a-half-minute exercise in bombast: screeching tires, spiraling electric guitar, the back-to-back steamroll of Rick Ross handing off to Lil Wayne handing off to four straight minutes of Jay-Z. Jay's sprawling verse should be its own track—even the joy of hearing him brag about monogrammed pockets and "pushin' Fenty like fentanyl" wears out eventually—but "God Did" is ambitious, the first time since Khaled's early records that he's reached for actual grandness, instead of empty proclamations of it."

=== "Hov Did" ===
Ari Melber did an in-depth breakdown of Jay-Z's verse on his MSNBC show, drawing positive reactions from LeBron James, who shared Melber's segment on Twitter. Jay-Z broke a Twitter hiatus to respond, and then Jay-Z then released Melber's "acutely detailed dissection" of the verse as a new track, "Hov Did," on streaming music platforms. Jay-Z said Melber did an "amazing job" explaining and reporting on the verse, and making people feel "seen."

== Charts ==
Chart performance for "God Did"
Chart (2022)	Peak position
Canada Hot 100 (Billboard)	29
Global 200 (Billboard)	24
New Zealand Hot Singles (RMNZ)	11
South Africa Streaming (TOSAC)	2
UK Singles (OCC)	50
US Billboard Hot 100	17
US Hot R&B/Hip-Hop Songs (Billboard)	6

== Certifications ==
Certifications for "God Did"
Region	Certification	Certified units/sales
United States (RIAA)	Gold	500,000^{‡}
^{‡} Sales+streaming figures based on certification alone.
