= Some Days I'm Good, Some Days I'm Not =

Studio album by Fridayy
- Released: February 28, 2025
- Genres: R&B; hip-hop; afrobeats
- Length: 59:20
- Labels: Lost in Melody; Def Jam
- Producers: Aidan Brody; Bam Beatzz; Bizness Boi; Brandon Avant; Brody; Christian Mombru; Daniel Church; Derelle Rideout; Euro; FaxOnly; Fortune; Fridayy; Gabe; Jean LeBlanc; Josh Thomas; Kofo; Kristian Hossy; Kvrim; Kxhris; Lucid; Mombru; Musikspirit; Ryan Ofei; VYNK; Xander

Fridayy chronology
Fridayy (2023)	Some Days I'm Good, Some Days I'm Not (2025)

Singles from Some Days I'm Good, Some Days I'm Not
- 1. "Without You" Released: March 8, 2024; 2. "Baddest in the Room" Released: June 21, 2024; 3. "Back to You" Released: October 25, 2024

Some Days I'm Good, Some Days I'm Not is the second studio album by Haitian-American singer Fridayy. It was released on February 28, 2025, by Def Jam Recordings and Lost in Melody. The album features guest appearances by Teni, Wale, Kehlani, Joé Dwèt Filé, Chris Brown, Meek Mill, and Llona.

== Background and recording ==
According to Fridayy, the album's content was inspired by his personal highs and lows following his 2023 self-titled debut, serving as a tribute to his late father and a reflection of his emotional journey.

A double album, it was written under the working title Bittersweet. The album's track listing reflects its title, with the first half featuring upbeat, feel-good tracks, and the second half delving into more introspective themes of grief, resilience, and self-discovery. On "Proud of Me", a collaboration with Meek Mill and Fridayy's highest-charting song as a lead artist, the two rappers address their shared experience of losing their fathers.

Fridayy's vision for the album incorporated a showcase of his range as a singer, writer, and producer, blending various genres such as R&B, hip-hop, gospel, kompa, and pop. "It's always important to me to put in everything that I am all in one project", he explained in an interview.

Fridayy explained that, rather than seeking commercial success or awards, Fridayy's goal with the album was to create music that resonates with fans deeply. "I don't like setting rigid goals for my work because that's how you set yourself up for disappointment," he said. "Instead, I focus on making music that moves people in a meaningful way."

== Critical reception ==
The album has a rating of 3 out of 5 stars on AllMusic.

== Track listing ==
Sometimes I'm Good, Sometimes I'm Not track listing
No.	Title	Writer(s)	Producer(s)	Length
1.	"Intro"	Francis LeBlanc; Christian Mombru	Fridayy; Mombru	0:31
2.	"Sun Comes Down"	LeBlanc; Mombru; Kristian Hossy	Fridayy; Hossy; Mombru	3:30
3.	"Wait for Me" (featuring Teni)	LeBlanc; Mombru; Hossy; Daniel Church; Francinor LeBlanc; Jean LeBlanc; Teniola Apata	Fridayy; Hossy; Josh Thomas; Mombru	2:33
4.	"Never Leave You"	LeBlanc; Dana Victoria Portalatin; Mariah Martinez	Aidan Brody; Lucid; Xander	2:39
5.	"Shotgun" (featuring Wale)	LeBlanc; Portalatin; Church; Martinez; Olubowale Akintimehin; Shamyra Smith	Brody; Bizness Boi; Church; Derelle Rideout; Fortune; Gabe; Kxhris	2:39
6.	"Saving My Love" (featuring Kehlani)	LeBlanc; Mombru; Hossy; Church; Kehlani Parrish	Hossy; Josh Thomas; Mombru	3:04
7.	"Back to You"	LeBlanc; Brody; Dana Victoria; Giovani Figueroa-Borges; Karim Esmail; Martinez	Brody; Fridayy; Kvrim; Lucid	3:31
8.	"That Vibe"	LeBlanc; Martinez; Dana Victoria; Leonardo Pierre; Saintiler Saintil	Fridayy; Kvrim; Mombru	1:14
9.	"Bezwen Ou" (featuring Joé Dwèt Filé)	LeBlanc; Mombru; Hossy; Pierre; Saintil; Joé Dwèt Filé	Fridayy; Hossy; Mombru	3:31
10.	"One Call Away" (featuring Chris Brown)	LeBlanc; Chris Brown; Portalatin; Church; Elliot Trent; Jerome Phillips; Martinez; Smith	Fortune; Fridayy; Gabe; Kvrim; Kxhris; Mombru	2:32
11.	"Baddest in the Room"	LeBlanc; Mombru; Portalatin; Pierre; Martinez; Saintil	Fridayy; Mombru	2:39
Total length:				28:23

Sometimes I'm Good, Sometimes I'm Not disc two track listing
No.	Title	Writer(s)	Producer(s)	Length
1.	"Proud of Me" (featuring Meek Mill)	LeBlanc; Marco Pierre; Rodney Montreal; Robert Rihmeek Williams	Fortune; Fridayy; Musikspirit	3:51
2.	"Make it Home"	LeBlanc; Francinor LeBlanc; Tish Hyman	Fortune; Hossy; Kxhris; Mombru	2:42
3.	"Desert"	LeBlanc; Portalatin; Figueroa-Borges; Pierre; Martinez	Lucid; VYNK; Xander	3:33
4.	"Look to You" (featuring Llona)	LeBlanc; Mombru; Pierre; Michael Ajuma Attah; Saintil	Fridayy; Mombru	3:00
5.	"Come Home"	LeBlanc; Figueroa-Borges; Pierre	Lucid; VYNK; Xander	3:27
6.	"Love Again"	LeBlanc; Dana Victoria; Church	Brody; Church; Fortune; Lucid; Xander	2:22
7.	"February '23"	LeBlanc; Pierre	Fridayy	2:21
8.	"Some Days I'm Good, Some Days I'm Not"	LeBlanc; Edgar Cutino	Fridayy; Jean LeBlanc	2:30
9.	"Without You"	LeBlanc; Brandon Avant; Jamal Europe; Jean LeBlanc; Kevin Ekofo; Pierre; Robert Elijah Fairfax III; Ryan Ofei; Tarik Henry	Bam Beatzz; Euro; FaxOnly; Jean LeBlanc; Kofo; Ryan Ofei	2:57
10.	"Better Days"	LeBlanc; Mombru; Hossy	Fridayy; Hossy; Mombru	4:14
Total length:				30:57

== Charts ==
Chart performance for Some Days I'm Good, Some Days I'm Not
Chart (2025)	Peak position
US Billboard 200	51
