= Fridayy =

American singer

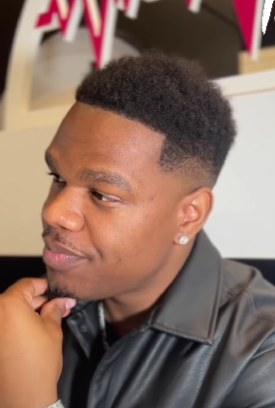
- Fridayy in 2023

Background information
- Born: Francis Leblanc; Philadelphia, Pennsylvania, U.S.
- Genres: R&B; hip-hop
- Occupations: Singer; rapper; songwriter; record producer
- Works: Recording; production
- Years active: 2014–present
- Labels: Def Jam; Lost In Melody

Francis Leblanc, known professionally as Fridayy, is an American singer and rapper from Philadelphia, Pennsylvania. In 2022, he signed with Def Jam Recordings and guest performed on the hit songs "Forever" by Lil Baby and the title track of DJ Khaled's album God Did (2022). Both songs peaked within the top 20 of the US Billboard Hot 100, while the latter was nominated for three Grammy Awards.

His 2023 single, "When It Comes to You", marked his first entry on the Billboard Hot 100 as a lead artist and received platinum certification by the Recording Industry Association of America (RIAA).

== Early life ==
Growing up with his parents Leblanc started playing instruments including piano, bass, and guitar at the age of 6. His father is a pastor and he credits his passion for music to his days in the church sanctuary. Leblanc is of Haitian descent.

== Career ==
Leblanc recognized his vocal abilities at a very young age: "I used to sing in church — probably at like, 9 or 10. I used to play instruments too, so everybody knew early on I was talented. But I started taking music seriously when I was 14, when my cousin Marco introduced me to producing. He gave me my first laptop so being the [type of] musician I was in church, it was very easy for me to produce and record myself." Leblanc chose "Fridayy" as his stage name being inspired by the stage names of singers The Weeknd and PartyNextDoor. Fridayy mentioned Boyz II Men, Drake and Kanye West as his early influences.

In June 2022, he was credited on Chris Brown's album, Breezy, as a songwriter and producer on the record's opening track "Till the Wheels Fall Off". In October 2022, Fridayy released his debut single, "Don't Give Up On Me", anticipating his first official EP titled "Lost in Melody". That same month, he guest appeared on Lil Baby's album It's Only Me on the track "Forever", which peaked at number eight on the Billboard Hot 100. Also that same month, he released his debut extended play, Lost in Melody, which contained a guest appearance from frequent collaborator, American singer Vory. In November 2022, Fridayy received three Grammy Award nominations as a featured artist alongside Jay-Z, John Legend, Rick Ross, and Lil Wayne on DJ Khaled's song "God Did" at the 65th Annual Grammy Awards. By the end of that year, he signed with Def Jam Recordings.

In June 2023, his song "Don't Give It Away", featuring Chris Brown, was released as the lead single from Fridayy's self-titled debut studio album. Fridayy was released on August 25, 2023. The album spawned the single "When It Comes to You", that marked the singer's first entry on the US Billboard Hot 100 as a lead artist.

In 2024, he began touring as the opening act for dancehall artist Buju Banton's "The Overcomer Tour".

In February 2025, Fridayy released his second studio album, Some Days I'm Good, Some Days I'm Not. It contains the Billboard Hot 100-charting song "Proud of Me", a collaboration with Meek Mill. The album peaked at number 51 on the US Billboard 200.

== Artistry ==
Fridayy sings in a baritone voice, mostly performing over self-produced instrumentals, as well as mixing R&B with hip-hop, gospel, and Afrobeats. According to American Songwriter, "Fridayy brought a more R&B, gospel-inspired sound to a crop of acts mostly involved with rap".

== Discography ==
- Fridayy (2023)
- Some Days I'm Good, Some Days I'm Not (2025)
- Tension (2026)

== Tours ==
Supporting

- The Overcomer Tour (for Buju Banton) (2024)

== Awards and nominations ==
| Award | Year | Nominee | Category | Result | Ref. |
|---|---|---|---|---|---|
| Soul Train Music Awards | 2023 | Himself | Best New Artist | Nominated | |
| Soul Train Music Awards | 2023 | "Came Too Far" | Best Gospel/Inspirational Song | Nominated | |
| BET Hip Hop Awards | 2023 | "God Did" (featuring Rick Ross, Lil Wayne, Jay-Z, John Legend and Fridayy) | Song of the Year | Nominated | |
| BET Hip Hop Awards | 2023 | "God Did" (featuring Rick Ross, Lil Wayne, Jay-Z, John Legend and Fridayy) | Impact Track | Nominated | |
| BET Hip Hop Awards | 2023 | "God Did" (featuring Rick Ross, Lil Wayne, Jay-Z, John Legend and Fridayy) | Best Collaboration | Nominated | |
| Grammy Awards | 2023 | "God Did" (featuring Rick Ross, Lil Wayne, Jay-Z, John Legend and Fridayy) | Song of the Year | Nominated | |
| Grammy Awards | 2023 | "God Did" (featuring Rick Ross, Lil Wayne, Jay-Z, John Legend and Fridayy) | Best Rap Song | Nominated | |
| Grammy Awards | 2023 | "God Did" (featuring Rick Ross, Lil Wayne, Jay-Z, John Legend and Fridayy) | Best Rap Performance | Nominated | |
| BET Awards | 2024 | Himself | Best New Artist | Nominated | |
| BET Awards | 2024 | Himself | Best Male R&B/Pop Artist | Nominated | |
| iHeartRadio Music Awards | 2024 | Himself | Best New R&B Artist | Nominated | |
| Grammy Awards | 2026 | "Proud of Me" (featuring Meek Mill) | Best Melodic Rap Performance | Nominated | |
