= DJ Khaled discography =

Hip hop disc jockey discography

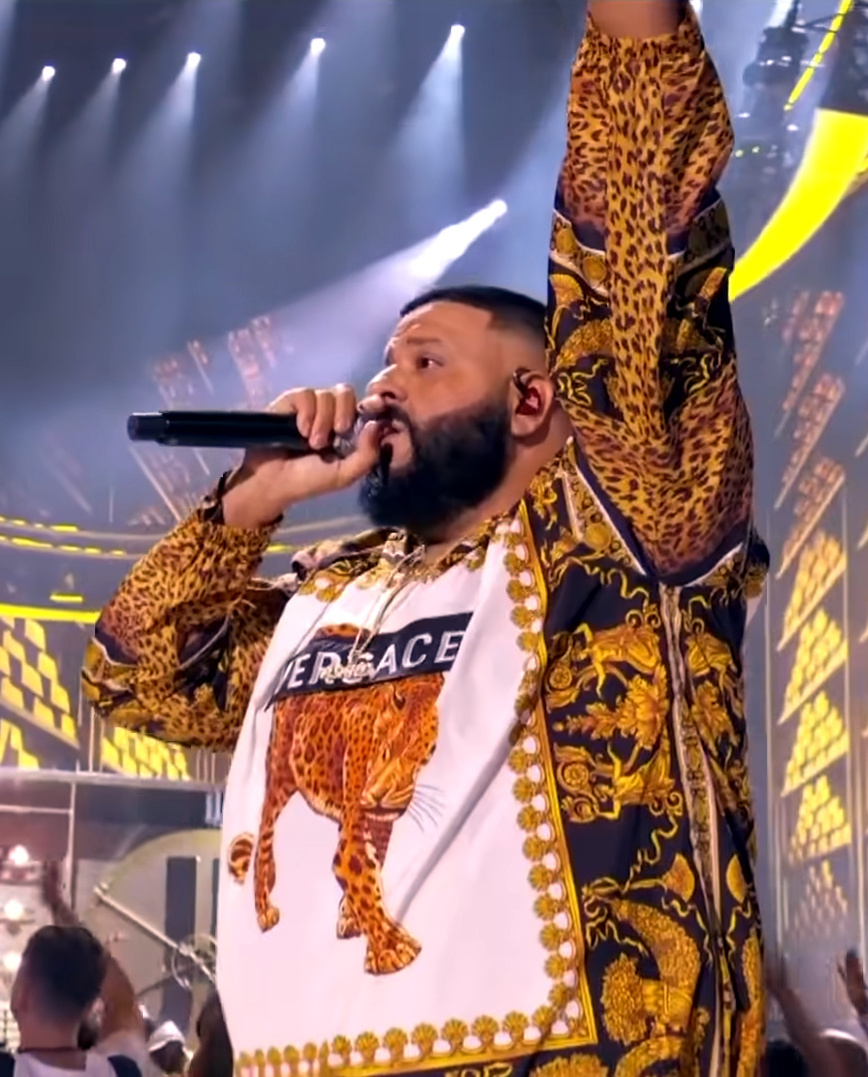
- Khaled in 2018
- Studio albums: 13
- Singles: 45
- Music videos: 33
- Featured singles: 12

The discography of American disc jockey DJ Khaled consists of thirteen studio albums which contain 54 singles (including 11 as a featured artist); his videography consists of at least 58 music videos (including 6 as a featured artist). Khaled's value proposition is his extensive network of artists of whom he enlists to perform on studio recordings. While first accumulating such connections from his work as a live DJ and radio personality, he has since become known himself for numerous quips and phrases uttered on these records—many of which became Internet memes. Furthermore, his interviews, quotes, or other presentative qualities have often been described as "motivational" or "inspirational". Despite commercial success, the albums in Khaled's discography have often garnered largely mixed receptions from music critics.

Each released independently, Khaled released his first four albums: Listennn... the Album on June 6, 2006 (reaching number 12 on the Billboard 200), We the Best on June 12, 2007 (number eight), We Global on September 16, 2007 (number seven), and Victory on March 2, 2010 (number 14). The albums spawned Billboard Hot 100 Top 40 hits including "I'm So Hood" (featuring T-Pain, Trick Daddy, Rick Ross, and Plies), "We Takin Over" (featuring Akon, T.I., Rick Ross, Fat Joe, Birdman, and Lil Wayne), "Out Here Grindin" (featuring Akon, Rick Ross, Young Jeezy, Lil Boosie, Trick Daddy, Ace Hood and Plies), and "All I Do Is Win" (featuring T-Pain, Ludacris, Snoop Dogg, and Rick Ross).

On July 19, 2011, Khaled released his fifth studio album and major label debut, We the Best Forever through Cash Money Records and Young Money Entertainment, imprints of Republic Records. The album reached number five on the Billboard 200 and produced his first Billboard Hot 100 top-10 single, "I'm on One" (featuring Drake, Rick Ross, and Lil Wayne).

On August 21, 2012, Khaled released his sixth studio album, Kiss the Ring. The album reached number four on the Billboard 200. On October 22, 2013, Khaled released his seventh studio album, Suffering from Success. The album reached number seven on the Billboard 200 and produced the top-40 single, "No New Friends" (featuring Drake, Rick Ross, and Lil Wayne), which peaked at number 37 on the Billboard Hot 100.

Khaled departed from the labels for an exclusive one-album contract with Sony Music and RED Distribution, releasing his eighth studio album, I Changed a Lot on October 23, 2015. The album reached number 12 on the Billboard 200 and spawned the commercial R&B single "Hold You Down" (featuring Chris Brown, August Alsina, Future, and Jeremih), which peaked at number 39 on the Billboard Hot 100.

After gaining wider attention as an Internet meme and signing with Epic Records, Khaled released his ninth studio album, Major Key on July 29, 2016. The album debuted and peaked atop the Billboard 200, becoming his first project to do so. It produced the top-20 single, "For Free" (featuring Drake) which peaked at number 13 on the Billboard Hot 100. It also produced the top-40 singles, "I Got the Keys" (featuring Jay-Z and Future) and "Do You Mind" (featuring Nicki Minaj, Chris Brown, August Alsina, Jeremih, Future, and Rick Ross); the songs reached numbers 30 and 27 on the Hot 100 respectively.

On June 23, 2017, Khaled released his tenth studio album, Grateful. The album became his second to peak atop the Billboard 200, and produced his first Billboard Hot 100 number-one single, "I'm the One" (featuring Justin Bieber, Quavo, Chance the Rapper, and Lil Wayne). It was followed by another single, "Wild Thoughts" (featuring Rihanna and Bryson Tiller), which peaked at number two on the Hot 100.

On May 17, 2019, Khaled released his eleventh studio album, Father of Asahd. The album debuted and peaked at number two on the Billboard 200. It was preceded by two singles released a year prior: "No Brainer" (featuring Justin Bieber, Chance the Rapper, and Quavo), which peaked at number five on the Billboard Hot 100, and "Top Off" (featuring Jay-Z, Future, and Beyoncé), which peaked at number 22. It also produced the hit song "Wish Wish" (featuring Cardi B and 21 Savage), which peaked at number 19. The album also contained the Grammy Award-winning single "Higher" (featuring Nipsey Hussle and John Legend), reaching number 21 on the Hot 100.

On April 30, 2021, Khaled released his self-titled twelfth studio album, Khaled Khaled (titular of his legal name). The album debuted and peaked atop the Billboard 200, giving him his third chart-topping project. It produced the top-10 singles, "Popstar" and "Greece", both of which feature Drake and were released a year prior; the songs debuted and peaked at numbers three and eight on the Billboard Hot 100, respectively. The album also produced the top-20 single, "Every Chance I Get" (featuring Lil Baby and Lil Durk), peaking at number 20 on the Hot 100, as well as the song "Sorry Not Sorry" (featuring Nas, Jay-Z, and James Fauntleroy) peaking at number 30.

On August 26, 2022, Khaled released his thirteenth studio album God Did, becoming fourth non-consecutive number one album. It produced the top-10 single, "Staying Alive" (featuring Drake and Lil Baby). He departed Epic after its release, and signed a recording contract with Def Jam Recordings to release his upcoming fourteenth album, Aalam of God.

== Albums ==
=== As lead artist ===
Studio albums
Title	Album details	Peak chart positions										Certifications
Title	Album details	US	US R&B/HH	US Rap	AUS	BEL (FL)	CAN	NL	NZ	SWE	UK	Certifications
Listennn... the Album	Released: June 6, 2006; Label: Terror Squad, Koch; Format: CD, digital download	12	3	3	—	—	—	—	—	—	—	
We the Best	Released: June 12, 2007; Label: Terror Squad, Koch; Format: CD, digital download	8	2	2	—	—	38	—	—	—	—	
We Global	Released: September 16, 2008; Label: We the Best, Terror Squad, Koch; Format: CD, digital download	7	4	3	—	—	33	—	—	—	—	
Victory	Released: March 2, 2010; Label: We the Best, E1 Music; Format: CD, digital download	14	5	2	—	—	56	—	—	—	—	
We the Best Forever	Released: July 19, 2011; Label: We the Best, Cash Money, Universal Motown; Format: CD, digital download	5	2	1	—	—	57	—	—	—	—	RIAA: Gold
Kiss the Ring	Released: August 21, 2012; Label: We the Best, Cash Money, Universal Republic; Format: CD, digital download	4	3	2	—	—	17	—	—	—	—	
Suffering from Success	Released: October 22, 2013; Label: We the Best, Cash Money, Republic; Format: CD, digital download	7	2	2	—	—	—	—	—	—	196	
I Changed a Lot	Released: October 23, 2015; Label: We the Best, RED; Format: CD, digital download, streaming	12	2	1	—	178	98	—	—	—	—	
Major Key	Released: July 29, 2016; Label: We the Best, Epic; Format: CD, digital download, streaming	1	1	1	6	15	3	38	15	58	7	RIAA: Platinum; MC: Gold
Grateful	Released: June 23, 2017; Label: We the Best, Epic; Format: CD, digital download, streaming	1	1	1	7	34	2	8	15	6	10	RIAA: 2× Platinum; MC: Platinum
Father of Asahd	Released: May 17, 2019; Label: We the Best, Epic; Format: CD, digital download, streaming	2	1	1	7	10	1	6	7	9	6	RIAA: Platinum; BPI: Silver; MC: Gold
Khaled Khaled	Released: April 30, 2021; Label: We the Best, Epic; Format: CD, digital download, streaming	1	1	1	7	23	2	8	7	14	10	RIAA: Platinum; BPI: Silver; MC: Gold
God Did	Released: August 26, 2022; Label: We the Best, Epic; Format: CD, digital download, streaming	1	1	1	9	16	1	10	4	23	4	RIAA: Gold
Aalam of God	Scheduled: 2026 or 2027; Label: We the Best, Republic Records; Format: CD, digital download, streaming	To be released										
"—" denotes a recording that did not chart or was not released in that territory.

=== As host ===
Title	Year	Artist	Ref
Life of a Yungsta	2008	Lil Phat	
In Gwalla We Trust	2016	Humongous The God	
No Ceilings 3	2020	Lil Wayne	
DeShawn	2025	YoungBoy Never Broke Again	

== Singles ==
=== As lead artist ===
Title	Year	Peak chart positions										Certifications	Album
Title	Year	US	US R&B/HH	US Rap	AUS	CAN	FRA	NLD	NZ	UK	WW	Certifications	Album
"Holla at Me" (featuring Lil Wayne, Paul Wall, Fat Joe, Rick Ross and Pitbull)	2006	59	24	15	—	—	—	—	—	—	—		Listennn... the Album
"Grammy Family" (featuring Kanye West, Consequence and John Legend)	2006	—	— (Note: "Grammy Family" did not enter the Hot R&B/Hip-Hop Songs chart, but peaked at number 24 on the Bubbling Under R&B/Hip-Hop Singles.)	—	—	—	—	—	—	—	—		Listennn... the Album
"Born-N-Raised" (featuring Pitbull, Trick Daddy and Rick Ross)	2006	—	83	—	—	—	—	—	—	—	—		Listennn... the Album
"We Takin' Over" (featuring Akon, T.I., Rick Ross, Fat Joe, Birdman and Lil Wayne)	2007	28	26	11	—	92	—	—	—	—	—	RIAA: Platinum; MC: Gold	We the Best
"I'm So Hood" (featuring T-Pain, Trick Daddy, Rick Ross and Plies)	2007	19	9	5	—	—	—	—	—	—	—	RIAA: Platinum	We the Best
"Out Here Grindin" (featuring Akon, Rick Ross, Young Jeezy, Lil Boosie, Trick Daddy, Ace Hood and Plies)	2008	38	32	17	—	71	—	—	—	—	—	RIAA: Gold; MC: Gold	We Global
"Go Hard" (featuring Kanye West and T-Pain)	2008	69	53	19	—	—	—	—	—	—	—		We Global
"Fed Up" (featuring Usher, Drake, Young Jeezy and Rick Ross)	2009	— (Note: "Fed Up" did not chart on the US Billboard Hot 100 but did peak at number eight on the Bubbling Under Hot 100 Singles chart.)	45	22	—	—	—	—	—	—	—		Victory
"Put Your Hands Up" (featuring Young Jeezy, Plies, Rick Ross and Schife)	2010	—	— (Note: "Put Your Hands Up" did not enter the Hot R&B/Hip-Hop Songs chart, but peaked at number two on the Bubbling Under R&B/Hip-Hop Singles.)	—	—	—	—	—	—	—	—		Victory
"All I Do Is Win" (featuring T-Pain, Ludacris, Snoop Dogg and Rick Ross)	2010	24	8	6	—	69	—	—	—	98	—	RIAA: 3× Platinum; BPI: Gold; MC: Platinum; RMNZ: Platinum	Victory
"Welcome to My Hood" (featuring Rick Ross, Plies, Lil Wayne and T-Pain)	2011	79	30	14	—	—	—	—	—	—	—	RIAA: Gold	We the Best Forever
"I'm on One" (featuring Drake, Rick Ross and Lil Wayne)	2011	10	1	1	—	67	—	—	—	78	—	RIAA: 5× Platinum; BPI: Silver; RMNZ: Gold	We the Best Forever
"It Ain't Over Til It's Over" (featuring Mary J. Blige, Fabolous and Jadakiss)	2011	—	52	—	—	—	—	—	—	—	—		We the Best Forever
"Legendary" (featuring Chris Brown, Keyshia Cole and Ne-Yo)	2011	—	100	—	—	—	—	—	—	—	—		We the Best Forever
"Take It to the Head" (featuring Rick Ross, Chris Brown, Nicki Minaj and Lil Wayne)	2012	58	6	6	—	—	—	—	—	185	—	RIAA: Platinum	Kiss the Ring
"I Wish You Would" (featuring Kanye West and Rick Ross)	2012	78	37	19	—	—	—	—	—	—	—	RIAA: Gold	Kiss the Ring
"No New Friends" (featuring Drake, Rick Ross and Lil Wayne)	2013	37	9	8	—	—	—	—	—	106	—	RIAA: Platinum	Suffering from Success
"I Wanna Be with You" (featuring Future, Nicki Minaj, & Rick Ross)	2013	— (Note: "I Wanna Be with You" did not chart on the Billboard Hot 100 chart but did peak at number one on the Bubbling Under Hot 100 Singles chart.)	30	22	—	—	—	—	—	—	—	RIAA: Gold	Suffering from Success
"They Don't Love You No More" (featuring Jay-Z, Meek Mill, Rick Ross and French Montana)	2014	— (Note: "They Don't Love You No More" did not chart on the Billboard Hot 100 chart but did peak at number five on the Bubbling Under Hot 100 Singles chart.)	30	17	—	—	—	—	—	—	—		I Changed a Lot
"Hold You Down" (featuring Chris Brown, August Alsina, Future and Jeremih)	2014	39	10	—	—	—	—	—	—	—	—	RIAA: Platinum; RMNZ: Gold	I Changed a Lot
"How Many Times" (featuring Chris Brown, Lil Wayne and Big Sean)	2015	68	23	17	—	—	120	—	—	—	—	RIAA: Gold	I Changed a Lot
"Gold Slugs" (featuring Chris Brown, August Alsina and Fetty Wap)	2015	— (Note: "Gold Slugs" did not chart on the Billboard Hot 100 chart but did peak at number 19 on the Bubbling Under Hot 100 Singles chart.)	49	—	—	—	—	—	—	121	—	RIAA: Gold; ARIA: Gold; RMNZ: Gold	I Changed a Lot
"For Free" (featuring Drake)	2016	13	4	2	70	47	79	—	—	25	—	RIAA: 4× Platinum; BPI: Gold; MC: 2× Platinum; RMNZ: Platinum	Major Key
"I Got the Keys" (featuring Jay-Z and Future)	2016	30	9	5	—	55	125	—	—	149	—	RIAA: Platinum; MC: Platinum	Major Key
"Holy Key" (featuring Big Sean, Kendrick Lamar, and Betty Wright)	2016	84	29	22	99	—	152	—	—	—	—	RIAA: Gold	Major Key
"Do You Mind" (featuring Nicki Minaj, Chris Brown, August Alsina, Jeremih, Future, and Rick Ross)	2016	27	9	7	65	93	162	—	—	197	—	RIAA: 4× Platinum; ARIA: 2× Platinum; BPI: Silver; MC: Gold; RMNZ: Platinum	Major Key
"Shining" (featuring Beyoncé and Jay-Z)	2017	57	23	15	93	72	74	—	—	71	—	RIAA: Platinum; ARIA: Gold; BPI: Silver; MC: Gold; RMNZ: Gold	Grateful
"I'm the One" (featuring Justin Bieber, Quavo, Chance the Rapper, and Lil Wayne)	2017	1	1	1	1	1	11	4	1	1	—	RIAA: Diamond; ARIA: 8× Platinum; BPI: 2× Platinum; MC: 7× Platinum; RMNZ: 4× Platinum; SNEP: Diamond	Grateful
"Wild Thoughts" (featuring Rihanna and Bryson Tiller)	2017	2	1	—	2	2	2	6	2	1	—	RIAA: 9× Platinum; ARIA: 7× Platinum; BPI: 4× Platinum; MC: 5× Platinum; RMNZ: 5× Platinum; SNEP: Diamond	Grateful
"Top Off" (featuring Jay-Z, Future, and Beyoncé)	2018	22	14	11	—	48	55	—	— (Note: "Top Off" did not enter the NZ Top 40 Singles Chart, but peaked at number five on the NZ Heatseeker Singles Chart.)	41	—	RIAA: Platinum; MC: Gold	Father of Asahd
"I Believe" (featuring Demi Lovato)	2018	—	—	—	—	—	—	—	—	—	—		A Wrinkle in Time
"No Brainer" (featuring Justin Bieber, Chance the Rapper, and Quavo)	2018	5	4	—	6	4	59	17	2	3	—	RIAA: 3× Platinum; ARIA: 4× Platinum; BPI: Platinum; MC: 3× Platinum; RMNZ: 2× Platinum	Father of Asahd
"Higher" (featuring Nipsey Hussle and John Legend)	2019	21	9	7	—	40	—	—	—	43	—	RIAA: Gold	Father of Asahd
"Just Us" (featuring SZA)	2019	43	18	—	32	65	—	—	25	66	—	RIAA: Platinum; ARIA: Platinum; MC: Gold; RMNZ: 2× Platinum	Father of Asahd
"You Stay" (featuring Meek Mill, J Balvin, Lil Baby, and Jeremih)	2019	44	19	—	—	63	—	—	—	—	—	RIAA: Platinum	Father of Asahd
"Important" (with Lil Blurry)	2020	—	—	—	—	—	—	—	—	—	—		Non-album single
"Popstar" (featuring Drake)	2020	3	3	3	10	1	101	42	17	11	11	RIAA: 4× Platinum; ARIA: 2× Platinum; BPI: Gold; MC: Platinum; RMNZ: Platinum; SNEP: Gold	Khaled Khaled
"Greece" (featuring Drake)	2020	8	6	5	35	3	129	71	— (Note: "Greece" did not enter the NZ Top 40 Singles Chart, but peaked at number two on the NZ Hot Singles Chart.)	8	38	RIAA: 2× Platinum; ARIA: Platinum; BPI: Platinum; RMNZ: Platinum; SNEP: Gold	Khaled Khaled
"Sunshine (The Light)" (with Fat Joe and Amorphous)	2021	— (Note: "Sunshine (The Light)" did not enter the Billboard Hot 100, but peaked at number 11 on the Bubbling Under Hot 100 chart.)	46	—	—	—	—	—	— (Note: "Sunshine (The Light)" did not enter the NZ Top 40 Singles Chart, but peaked at number nine on the NZ Hot Singles Chart.)	53	—	BPI: Silver; RMNZ: Gold	Non-album single
"Let It Go" (featuring Justin Bieber and 21 Savage)	2021	54	25	19	—	28	—	—	— (Note: "Let It Go" did not enter the NZ Top 40 Singles Chart, but peaked at number eight on the NZ Hot Singles Chart.)	—	49	RIAA: Gold	Khaled Khaled
"Every Chance I Get" (featuring Lil Baby and Lil Durk)	2021	20	6	8	—	25	—	—	— (Note: "Every Chance I Get" did not enter the NZ Top 40 Singles Chart, but peaked at number fourteen on the NZ Hot Singles Chart.)	73	27	RIAA: 5× Platinum; BPI: Silver; RMNZ: Gold	Khaled Khaled
"I Did It" (featuring Post Malone, Megan Thee Stallion, Lil Baby, and DaBaby)	2021	43	17	14	99	22	—	—	— (Note: "I Did It" did not enter the NZ Top 40 Singles Chart, but peaked at number seven on the NZ Hot Singles Chart.)	53	33	RIAA: Gold	Khaled Khaled
"Body in Motion" (featuring Bryson Tiller, Lil Baby, and Roddy Ricch)	2021	79	33	—	—	66	—	—	— (Note: "Body in Motion" did not enter the NZ Top 40 Singles Chart, but peaked at number sixteen on the NZ Hot Singles Chart.)	—	96	RIAA: Gold	Khaled Khaled
"Borracho" (with Sech)	2021	—	—	—	—	—	—	—	—	—	—		Non-album single
"Staying Alive" (featuring Drake and Lil Baby)	2022	5	3	1	16	3	—	79	19	21	10	RIAA: Platinum; MC: Platinum; RMNZ: Gold	God Did
"Big Time" (featuring Future and Lil Baby)	2022	31	11	9	—	50	—	—	—	—	62		God Did
"Supposed to Be Loved" (with Lil Baby and Future featuring Lil Uzi Vert)	2023	52	15	13	—	—	—	—	— (Note: "Supposed to Be Loved" did not enter the NZ Top 40 Singles Chart, but peaked at number 15 on the NZ Hot Singles Chart.)	—	—		Non-album singles
"Dientes" (with J Balvin and Usher)	2023	— (Note: "Dientes" did not chart on the US Billboard Hot 100 but did peak at number 24 on the Bubbling Under Hot 100 Singles chart.)	—	—	—	—	—	—	—	—	—		Non-album singles
"You Remind Me" (featuring Vybz Kartel, Buju Banton, Bounty Killer, Mavado, Rorystonelove and Kaylan Arnold)	2025	—	—	—	—	—	—	—	—	—	—		Aalam of God
"Hot Shot" (featuring Buju Banton and Bounty Killer)	2025	—	—	—	—	—	—	—	—	—	—		Aalam of God
"Brother" (with Post Malone featuring YoungBoy Never Broke Again)	2025	—	30	—	—	—	—	—	—	—	—		Aalam of God
"One of Them" (with Future and Lil Baby)	2026	70	17	11	—	—	—	—	— (Note: "One of Them" did not enter the NZ Top 40 Singles Chart, but peaked at number 24 on the NZ Hot Singles Chart.)	—	—		Aalam of God
"—" denotes a recording that did not chart or was not released in that territory.

=== As featured artist ===
Title	Year	Peak chart positions					Certifications	Album
Title	Year	US	US R&B/HH	US Rap	CAN	UK	Certifications	Album
"Foolish" (Remix) (Shawty Lo featuring DJ Khaled, Birdman, Rick Ross and Jim Jones)	2008	—	—	—	—	—		Non-album singles
"The Kings of the Streets" (DJ Kay Slay featuring DJ Khaled, DJ Drama, DJ Doo Wop and Fly Nate)	2011	—	—	—	—	—		Non-album singles
"Cold" (Kanye West featuring DJ Khaled)	2012	86	69	—	85	—		Cruel Summer
"Pride N Joy" (Fat Joe featuring Kanye West, Miguel, Jadakiss, Mos Def, DJ Khaled, Roscoe Dash and Busta Rhymes)	2012	—	81	—	—	—		Non-album singles
"B-Boyz" (Birdman featuring Mack Maine, Kendrick Lamar, Ace Hood and DJ Khaled)	2012	—	—	—	—	—		Non-album singles
"Ima Boss" (Remix) (Meek Mill featuring T.I., Birdman, Lil Wayne, DJ Khaled, Rick Ross and Swizz Beatz)	2012	51	—	17	—	—		Non-album singles
"Bugatti" (Remix) (Ace Hood featuring Wiz Khalifa, T.I., Meek Mill, French Montana, 2 Chainz, Future, DJ Khaled and Birdman)	2013	—	—	—	—	—		Trials & Tribulations
"Bad Girl Takeover" (Just Ivy featuring DJ Khaled and Meek Mill)	2013	—	—	—	—	—		Non-album single
"Landslide" (Toby Randall featuring DJ Khaled)	2017	—	—	—	—	—		One
"Dinero" (Jennifer Lopez featuring DJ Khaled and Cardi B)	2018	80	—	—	75	—	RIAA: Gold	Non-album singles
"Amazing" (Mary J. Blige featuring DJ Khaled)	2021	—	—	—	—	—		Non-album singles
"Big Energy" (Remix) (Latto and Mariah Carey featuring DJ Khaled)	2022	—	—	—	—	21	ARIA: 3× Platinum; BPI: Gold	Non-album singles
"Love, Money, Fame" (Seventeen featuring DJ Khaled)	2024	—	—	—	—	—		Spill The Feels
"—" denotes a recording that did not chart or was not released in that territory.

=== Promotional singles ===
Title	Year	Peak chart positions								Certifications	Album
Title	Year	US	US R&B/HH	US Rap	AUS	CAN	FRA	NZ Heat.	UK	Certifications	Album
"I'm So Hood (Remix)" (featuring Young Jeezy, Ludacris, Busta Rhymes, Big Boi, Lil Wayne, Fat Joe, Birdman and Rick Ross)	2007	—	—	—	—	—	—	—	—		We the Best
"All I Do Is Win (Remix)" (featuring T-Pain, Diddy, Nicki Minaj, Rick Ross, Busta Rhymes, Fabolous, Jadakiss, Fat Joe and Swizz Beatz)	2010	—	—	—	—	—	—	—	—		Non-album single
"Welcome to My Hood (Remix)" (featuring Ludacris, T-Pain, Busta Rhymes, Mavado, Twista, Birdman, Ace Hood, Fat Joe, Jadakiss, Bun B, Game and Waka Flocka Flame)	2011	—	—	—	—	—	—	—	—		We the Best Forever
"You Mine" (featuring Trey Songz, Future and Jeremih)	2015	—	— (Note: "You Mine" did not enter the Hot R&B/Hip-Hop Songs chart, but peaked at number five on the Bubbling Under R&B/Hip-Hop Singles.)	—	—	—	—	—	—		I Changed a Lot
"To the Max" (featuring Drake)	2017	53	22	17	70	32	200	2	49	RIAA: Gold	Grateful
"—" denotes a recording that did not chart or was not released in that territory.

== Other charted songs ==
List of songs, with selected chart positions and certifications, showing year released and album name
Title	Year	Peak chart positions										Certifications	Album
Title	Year	US	US R&B/HH	US Rap	AUS	CAN	FRA	NZ Heat.	NZ Hot	UK	WW	Certifications	Album
"On My Way" (featuring Kevin Cossom, Bali, Ace Hood, Ball Greezy, Iceberg, Rum, Gunplay, Desloc and Young Cash)	2010	— (Note: "On My Way" did not chart on the Billboard Hot 100 chart but did peak at number 16 on the Bubbling Under Hot 100 Singles chart.)	—	—	—	—	—	—	—	—	—		Victory
"Bitches & Bottles (Let's Get It Started)" (featuring Lil Wayne, T.I. and Future)	2012	— (Note: "Bitches & Bottles (Let's Get It Started)" did not chart on the Billboard Hot 100 chart but did peak at number nine on the Bubbling Under Hot 100 Singles chart.)	— (Note: "Bitches & Bottles (Let's Get It Started)" did not enter the Hot R&B/Hip-Hop Songs chart, but peaked at number 24 on the Bubbling Under R&B/Hip-Hop Singles chart.)	—	—	—	—	—	—	—	—		Kiss the Ring
"I'm Still" (featuring Chris Brown, Wale, Wiz Khalifa and Ace Hood)	2013	—	— (Note: "I'm Still" did not enter the Hot R&B/Hip-Hop Songs chart, but peaked at number four on the Bubbling Under R&B/Hip-Hop Singles chart.)	—	—	—	—	—	—	—	—		Suffering from Success
"Nas Album Done" (featuring Nas)	2016	—	— (Note: "Nas Album Done" did not enter the Hot R&B/Hip-Hop Songs chart, but peaked at number one on the Bubbling Under R&B/Hip-Hop Singles chart.)	—	—	—	—	—	—	—	—		Major Key
"Jermaine's Interlude" (featuring J. Cole)	2016	—	— (Note: "Jermaine's Interlude" did not enter the Hot R&B/Hip-Hop Songs chart, but peaked at number one on the Bubbling Under R&B/Hip-Hop Singles chart.)	—	—	—	—	—	—	—	—		Major Key
"Ima Be Alright" (featuring Bryson Tiller and Future)	2016	—	— (Note: "Ima Be Alright" did not enter the Hot R&B/Hip-Hop Songs chart, but peaked at number four on the Bubbling Under R&B/Hip-Hop Singles chart.)	—	—	—	—	—	—	—	—		Major Key
"Culture" (Migos featuring DJ Khaled)	2017	93	36	25	—	82	—	—	—	—	—		Culture
"Don't Quit" (with Calvin Harris featuring Travis Scott and Jeremih)	2017	68	30	21	—	50	146	2	—	75	—	MC: Gold	Grateful
"On Everything" (featuring Travis Scott, Rick Ross and Big Sean)	2017	88	37	—	—	69	—	10	—	—	—		Grateful
"I Can't Even Lie" (featuring Future and Nicki Minaj)	2017	— (Note: "I Can't Even Lie" did not chart on the Billboard Hot 100 chart but did peak at number four on the Bubbling Under Hot 100 Singles chart.)	— (Note: "I Can't Even Lie" did not enter the Hot R&B/Hip-Hop Songs chart, but peaked at number one on the Bubbling Under R&B/Hip-Hop Singles chart.)	—	—	—	—	—	—	—	—		Grateful
"Iced Out My Arms" (featuring Future, Migos, 21 Savage and T.I.)	2017	— (Note: "Iced Out My Arms" did not chart on the Billboard Hot 100 chart but did peak at number five on the Bubbling Under Hot 100 Singles chart.)	— (Note: "Iced Out My Arms" did not enter the Hot R&B/Hip-Hop Songs chart, but peaked at number two on the Bubbling Under R&B/Hip-Hop Singles chart.)	—	—	—	—	—	—	—	—		Grateful
"It's Secured" (featuring Nas and Travis Scott)	2017	— (Note: "It's Secured" did not chart on the Billboard Hot 100 chart but did peak at number 22 on the Bubbling Under Hot 100 Singles chart.)	— (Note: "It's Secured" did not enter the Hot R&B/Hip-Hop Songs chart, but peaked at number seven on the Bubbling Under R&B/Hip-Hop Singles chart.)	—	—	—	—	—	—	—	—		Grateful
"Major Bag Alert" (featuring Migos)	2017	— (Note: "Major Bag Alert" did not chart on the Billboard Hot 100 chart but did peak at number 24 on the Bubbling Under Hot 100 Singles chart.)	— (Note: "Major Bag Alert" did not enter the Hot R&B/Hip-Hop Songs chart, but peaked at number eight on the Bubbling Under R&B/Hip-Hop Singles chart.)	—	—	—	—	—	—	—	—		Grateful
"Down for Life" (featuring PartyNextDoor, Future, Travis Scott, Rick Ross and Kodak Black)	2017	— (Note: "Down for Life" did not chart on the Billboard Hot 100 chart but did peak at number 25 on the Bubbling Under Hot 100 Singles chart.)	— (Note: "Down for Life" did not enter the Hot R&B/Hip-Hop Songs chart, but peaked at number nine on the Bubbling Under R&B/Hip-Hop Singles chart.)	—	—	—	—	—	—	—	—		Grateful
"Holy Mountain" (featuring Buju Banton, Sizzla, Mavado and 070 Shake)	2019	— (Note: "Holy Mountain" did not chart on the Billboard Hot 100 chart but did peak at number 12 on the Bubbling Under Hot 100 Singles chart.)	—	—	—	99	—	—	—	—	—		Father of Asahd
"Wish Wish" (featuring Cardi B and 21 Savage)	2019	19	8	6	88	28	129	—	14	81	—	RIAA: 2× Platinum; ARIA: Gold; MC: Gold	Father of Asahd
"Jealous" (featuring Chris Brown, Lil Wayne, and Big Sean)	2019	57	26	—	59	54	167	—	8	37	—	RIAA: Gold; ARIA: Gold; RMNZ: Gold	Father of Asahd
"Celebrate" (featuring Travis Scott and Post Malone)	2019	52	23	19	51	37	—	—	11	48	—	RIAA: Gold	Father of Asahd
"Weather the Storm" (featuring Meek Mill and Lil Baby)	2019	91	44	—	—	—	—	—	—	—	—		Father of Asahd
"Big Boy Talk" (featuring Jeezy and Rick Ross)	2019	— (Note: "Big Boy Talk" did not chart on the Billboard Hot 100 chart but did peak at number 14 on the Bubbling Under Hot 100 Singles chart.)	—	—	—	—	—	—	—	—	—		Father of Asahd
"Freak n You" (featuring Lil Wayne and Gunna)	2019	— (Note: "Freak n You" did not chart on the Billboard Hot 100 chart but did peak at number three on the Bubbling Under Hot 100 Singles chart.)	49	—	—	—	—	—	—	—	—		Father of Asahd
"Thankful" (featuring Lil Wayne and Jeremih)	2021	100	46	—	—	—	—	—	—	—	159		Khaled Khaled
"Big Paper" (featuring Cardi B)	2021	84	37	—	—	—	—	—	—	—	156		Khaled Khaled
"We Going Crazy" (featuring H.E.R. and Migos)	2021	— (Note: "We Going Crazy" did not chart on the US Billboard Hot 100 but did peak at number three on the Bubbling Under Hot 100 chart.)	47	—	—	—	—	—	—	—	177		Khaled Khaled
"This Is My Year" (featuring A Boogie wit da Hoodie, Big Sean, Rick Ross and Puff Daddy)	2021	— (Note: "This Is My Year" did not chart on the US Billboard Hot 100 but did peak at number 20 on the Bubbling Under Hot 100 chart.)	—	—	—	—	—	—	—	—	—		Khaled Khaled
"Sorry Not Sorry" (featuring Nas, Jay-Z, and James Fauntleroy)	2021	30	13	11	—	65	—	—	—	80	48	RIAA: Gold	Khaled Khaled
"Just Be" (featuring Justin Timberlake)	2021	— (Note: "Just Be" did not chart on the US Billboard Hot 100 but did peak at number 21 on the Bubbling Under Hot 100 chart.)	—	—	—	—	—	—	—	—	—		Khaled Khaled
"I Can Have It All" (featuring Bryson Tiller, H.E.R. and Meek Mill)	2021	— (Note: "I Can Have It All" did not chart on the US Billboard Hot 100 but did peak at number 18 on the Bubbling Under Hot 100 chart.)	—	—	—	—	—	—	—	—	—		Khaled Khaled
"Where You Come From" (featuring Buju Banton, Capleton, Bounty Killer and Barrington Levy)	2021	— (Note: "Where You Come From" did not chart on the US Billboard Hot 100 but did peak at number 19 on the Bubbling Under Hot 100 chart.)	—	—	—	—	—	—	—	—	—		Khaled Khaled
"No Secret" (featuring Drake)	2022	78	27	24	—	74	—	—	—	—	146		God Did
"God Did" (featuring Rick Ross, Lil Wayne, Jay-Z, John Legend, and Fridayy)	2022	17	6	3	—	29	—	—	11	50	24		God Did
"Use This Gospel (Remix)" (featuring Kanye West and Eminem)	2022	49	14	13	—	55	—	—	15	—	77		God Did
"Keep Going" (featuring Lil Durk, 21 Savage, and Roddy Ricch)	2022	57	18	17	—	67	—	—	—	—	113		God Did
"Party" (featuring Quavo and Takeoff)	2022	66	22	20	—	73	—	—	—	—	122		God Did
"Beautiful" (featuring Future and SZA)	2022	29	10	8	—	46	—	—	7	67	53	RIAA: Gold	God Did
"It Ain't Safe" (featuring Nardo Wick and Kodak Black)	2022	77	26	23	—	89	—	—	—	—	185		God Did
"Let's Pray" (featuring Don Toliver and Travis Scott)	2022	86	28	—	—	75	—	—	—	—	173		God Did
"Fam Good, We Good" (featuring Gunna and Roddy Ricch)	2022	— (Note: "Fam Good, We Good" did not chart on the US Billboard Hot 100 but did peak at number nine on the Bubbling Under Hot 100 Singles chart.)	39	—	—	—	—	—	—	—	—		God Did
"Bills Paid" (featuring Latto and City Girls)	2022	— (Note: "Bills Paid" did not chart on the US Billboard Hot 100 but did peak at number six on the Bubbling Under Hot 100 Singles chart.)	35	—	—	—	—	—	—	—	—		God Did
"Way Past Luck" (featuring 21 Savage)	2022	— (Note: "Way Past Luck" did not chart on the US Billboard Hot 100 but did peak at number five on the Bubbling Under Hot 100 Singles chart.)	34	—	—	—	—	—	—	—	—		God Did
"Juice Wrld Did" (featuring Juice Wrld)	2022	55	16	15	—	56	—	—	13	—	99		God Did
"—" denotes a recording that did not chart or was not released in that territory.

== Guest appearances ==
Title	Year	Other artist(s)	Album
"I'm Feelin' Ya"	2002	Cognito	Tru Cognizance
"Face Good"	2008	Ace Hood, Flo Rida	All Bets On Ace
"Stop"	2008	DJ Pharris, The Game, Rick Ross, Sly Polaroid	—N/a
"Get It For Life"	2008	Fat Joe, Pooh Bear	The Elephant in the Room
"DJ Khaled Interlude"	2008	Rick Ross	Trilla
"Speedin'" (We The Best Remix)	2008	Rick Ross, R. Kelly, Plies, Birdman, Busta Rhymes, DJ Drama, Webbie, Gorilla Zoe, Fat Joe, Torch, Gunplay, DJ Bigga Rankin', Flo Rida, Brisco, Lil Wayne	—N/a
"Intro"	2008	T-Pain	Pr33 Ringz: Da Mixtape
"Cocky"	2008	T-Pain	Pr33 Ringz: Da Mixtape
"Reborn"	2008	T-Pain	Pr33 Ringz: Da Mixtape
"Superman"	2008	T-Pain	Pr33 Ringz: Da Mixtape
"Karaoke"	2008	T-Pain	Three Ringz
"Always Strapped" (Remix)	2009	Birdman, Lil Wayne, Young Jeezy, Rick Ross	Priceless
"Maybach Music 2.5"	2009	Rick Ross, T-Pain, Fabolous, Pusha T, Birdman	—N/a
"Gutta Bitch" (Remix)	2009	Trai'D, Hurricane Chris, Trina, Ace Hood, Bun B	—N/a
"The Pursuit"	2009	Masspike Miles, Rick Ross	The Pursuit Of Happiness
"My City"	2010	Pitbull, Jarvis	Mr. Worldwide
"America's Most Wanted"	2010	Jalil Lopez, Rick Ross	America's Most Wanted
"Mechanics" (Remix)	2010	Reek da Villian, Busta Rhymes, Swizz Beatz, Cam'ron, Vado, Method Man, Nelly	Crazy
"I'm Number 1"	2010	Nelly, Birdman	5.0
"Body To Body" (Remix)	2011	Ace Hood, Chris Brown, Rick Ross, Wale	The Statement 2
"I'ma Stunt"	2011	Bow Wow, Lil Wayne, 2 Chainz	Greenlight 4
"VNTM.com"	2011	La Fouine	Capitale du Crime Volume 3
"Movie"	2011	Magazeen, Rick Ross, DJ Nasty	—N/a
"Let It Fly" (Remix)	2011	Maino, Roscoe Dash, Ace Hood, Meek Mill, Jim Jones, Wale	I Am Who I Am
"It's On"	2012	R. Kelly, Ace Hood	—N/a
"The Fam"	2012	Chopper City, Birdman, Mack Maine, Lil Boosie	—N/a
"I Do This"	2012	Trae tha Truth, Rico Love, T.I.	Tha Blackprint
"TNT" (Remix)	2012	¡Mayday!, Black Thought, Jon Connor, Stevie Stone, Jay Rock	—N/a
"City of 30,000 Wolves"	2012	Stalley	Songs by Me, Stalley
"Intro (DJ Khaled Drop)"	2012	Lee Mazin	LoveLEE
"Intro / Bounce Back"	2012	Jarvis	Heartache
"Bitch Bad"	2012	Trina, French Montana	Back 2 Business
"Catastrophe"	2012	Busta Rhymes, Reek da Villian, J-Doe	Catastrophic
"One Night"	2013	Chinx Drugz, Roscoe Dash, French Montana	Cocaine Riot 3
"Take Over"	2013	Lil Snupe	R.N.I.C
"Don't Make Me Do It"	2013	Funkmaster Flex, Vado, French Montana, Meek Mill, Ace Hood	Who You Mad At? Me Or Yourself?
"Whole Lotta"	2013	Attitude, Timbaland	—N/a
"Fuck What Happens Tonight"	2013	French Montana, Mavado, Ace Hood, Snoop Dogg, Scarface	Excuse My French
"Freaks" (Remix)	2013	French Montana, Mavado, Rick Ross, Wale, Nicki Minaj	—N/a
"Where Is the Love?"	2016	The Black Eyed Peas, The World	—N/a
"Secure the Bag"	2016	The Lox, Gucci Mane, InfaRed	Filthy America... It's Beautiful
"I Remember"	2016	Yo Gotti	White Friday (CM9)
"Culture"	2017	Migos	Culture
"Glow Up"	2017	Mary J. Blige, Quavo, Missy Elliott	Strength of a Woman
"I Believe"	2018	Demi Lovato	A Wrinkle in Time
"Win"	2018	Stefflon Don	Secure
"Friend Like Me (End Title)"	2019	Will Smith	Aladdin (Original Motion Picture Soundtrack)
"Important"	2020	Lil Blurry	—N/a
"B.I.B.L.E. Talk"	2022	Fivio Foreign	B.I.B.L.E.

== Music videos ==
=== As lead artist ===
Title	Year	Director(s)
"Holla at Me" (featuring Lil Wayne, Paul Wall, Fat Joe, Rick Ross and Pitbull)	2006	R. Malcolm Jones
"Grammy Family" (featuring Kanye West, Consequence and John Legend)	2006	Bernard Gourley
"Born-N-Raised" (featuring Pitbull, Trick Daddy and Rick Ross)	2006	Gil Green
"We Takin' Over" (featuring Akon, T.I., Rick Ross, Fat Joe, Birdman and Lil Wayne)	2007	Gil Green
"I'm So Hood" (featuring T-Pain, Trick Daddy, Rick Ross and Plies)	2007	Gil Green
"I'm So Hood" (Remix) (featuring Young Jeezy, Ludacris, Busta Rhymes, Big Boi, Lil Wayne, Fat Joe, Birdman and Rick Ross)	2007	Dayo, Rush
"Out Here Grindin" (featuring Akon, Rick Ross, Plies, Lil Boosie, Ace Hood and Trick Daddy)	2008	Gil Green
"Go Hard" (featuring Kanye West and T-Pain)	2008	Hype Williams
"Fed Up" (featuring Usher, Drake, Young Jeezy and Rick Ross)	2009	Gil Green
"Put Your Hands Up" (featuring Young Jeezy, Rick Ross and Schife)	2010	Dayo, Gil Green
"All I Do Is Win" (featuring T-Pain, Ludacris, Snoop Dogg and Rick Ross)	2010	Dayo
"All I Do Is Win" (Remix) (featuring T-Pain, Diddy, Nicki Minaj, Rick Ross, Busta Rhymes, Fabolous, Jadakiss and Fat Joe)	2010	Gil Green
"Welcome To My Hood" (featuring Rick Ross, Plies, Lil Wayne and T-Pain)	2011	Gil Green
"Welcome To My Hood" (Remix) (featuring Ludacris, T-Pain, Busta Rhymes, Mavado, Twista, Birdman, Ace Hood, Fat Joe, Jadakiss, Bun B, Game and Waka Flocka Flame)	2011	Dayo
"I'm On One" (featuring Drake, Rick Ross and Lil Wayne)	2011	Gil Green
"It Ain't Over Til It's Over" (featuring Mary J. Blige, Fabolous and Jadakiss)	2011	Dayo
"Take It to the Head" (featuring Rick Ross, Chris Brown, Nicki Minaj and Lil Wayne)	2012	Colin Tilley
"I Wish You Would" (featuring Kanye West and Rick Ross)	2012	Hype Williams
"Bitches & Bottles (Let's Get It Started)" (featuring Lil Wayne, T.I., Future and Ace Hood)	2012	Gil Green
"I Did It For My Dawgz" (featuring Rick Ross, Meek Mill, French Montana and Jadakiss)	2012	Spiff TV
"Don't Get Me Started" (featuring Ace Hood)	2012	Edgar Esteves
"No New Friends" (featuring Drake, Rick Ross and Lil Wayne)	2013	Colin Tilley
"I Wanna Be with You" (featuring Nicki Minaj, Future and Rick Ross)	2013	Colin Tilley
"Never Surrender" (featuring Scarface, Jadakiss, Meek Mill, Akon, John Legend and Anthony Hamilton)	2013	Itchy House Films
"They Don't Love You No More" (featuring Jay Z, Meek Mill, Rick Ross and French Montana)	2014	Gil Green
"They Don't Love You No More (Remix)" (featuring French Montana and Remy Ma)	2014	Gil Green
"Hold You Down" (featuring Chris Brown, August Alsina, Future and Jeremih)	2014	Gil Green
"How Many Times" (featuring Chris Brown, Lil Wayne and Big Sean)	2015	Colin Tilley
"You Mine" (featuring Trey Songz, Jeremih and Future)	2015	Eif Rivera
"Gold Slugs" (featuring Chris Brown, August Alsina and Fetty Wap)	2015	Eif Rivera
"I Got the Keys" (featuring Jay Z and Future)	2016	Daniel Kaufman
"Nas Album Done" (featuring Nas)	2016	Eif Rivera, DJ Khaled
"Do You Mind" (featuring Nicki Minaj, Chris Brown, August Alsina, Jeremih, Future and Rick Ross)	2016	Gil Green
"I'm the One" (featuring Justin Bieber, Quavo, Chance the Rapper and Lil Wayne)	2017	Eif Rivera
"Wild Thoughts" (featuring Rihanna and Bryson Tiller)	2017	Colin Tilley
"Intro (I'm So Grateful)" (featuring Sizzla)	2017	Ivan Berrios
"On Everything" (featuring Travis Scott, Rick Ross and Big Sean)	2017	Eif Rivera
"It's Secured" (featuring Nas and Travis Scott)	2017	Eif Rivera
"I Believe" (featuring Demi Lovato)	2018	Hannah Lux Davis
"No Brainer" (featuring Justin Bieber, Chance the Rapper and Quavo)	2018	Colin Tilley
"Higher" (featuring Nipsey Hussle and John Legend)	2019	Eif Rivera
"Just Us" (featuring SZA)	2019	Joseph Kahn
"Celebrate" (featuring Travis Scott and Post Malone)	2019	Joseph Kahn
"Jealous" (featuring Chris Brown, Lil Wayne and Big Sean)	2019	DJ Khaled and Eif Rivera
"Holy Mountain" (featuring Buju Banton, Sizzla, Mavado and 070 Shake)	2019	Eif Rivera, DJ Khaled and Ivan Berrios
"You Stay" (featuring Meek Mill, J. Balvin, Lil Baby and Jeremih)	2019	Eif Rivera, DJ Khaled and Ivan Berrios
"Wish Wish" (featuring Cardi B and 21 Savage)	2019	DJ Khaled and Eif Rivera
"Weather the Storm" (featuring Meek Mill and Lil Baby)	2019	DJ Khaled and Eif Rivera
"Important" (with Lil Blurry)	2020	Trill Phil & Motion Family
"Popstar" (featuring Drake)	2020	Director X
"Sorry Not Sorry" (featuring Jay-Z and Nas)	2021	Hype Williams, Jay-Z and DJ Khaled
"Where You Come From" (featuring Buju Banton, Capleton and Bounty Killer)	2021	Ivan Berrios
"Thankful" (featuring Lil Wayne and Jeremih)	2021	Gil Green
"Every Chance I Get" (featuring Lil Baby and Lil Durk)	2021	Joseph Kahn
"We Going Crazy" (featuring H.E.R. and Migos)	2021	Joseph Kahn
"Let It Go" (featuring Justin Bieber and 21 Savage)	2021	Colin Tilley
"Body In Motion" (featuring Bryson Tiller, Lil Baby and Roddy Ricch)	2021	Joseph Kahn
"Staying Alive" (featuring Drake and Lil Baby)	2022	R.T. Thorne

=== As featured artist ===
Title	Year	Director(s)
"Foolish" (Remix) (Shawty Lo featuring DJ Khaled, Birdman, Rick Ross and Jim Jones)	2008	Dorian Forbes, Hitt Afta Hitt
"The Kings of the Streets" (DJ Kay Slay featuring DJ Khaled, DJ Drama, DJ Doo Wop and Fly Nate)	2011	—N/a
"Pride N Joy" (Fat Joe featuring Kanye West, Miguel, Jadakiss, Mos Def, DJ Khaled, Roscoe Dash and Busta Rhymes)	2012	Hype Williams
"B-Boyz" (Birdman featuring Mack Maine, Kendrick Lamar, Ace Hood and DJ Khaled)	2012	Derick G
"Bad Girl Takeover" (Just Ivy featuring DJ Khaled and Meek Mill)	2013	Dale Resteghini
"Landslide" (Toby Randall featuring DJ Khaled)	2017	David Evans, Joe Lyons

=== As guest ===
Title	Year	Director(s)
"All the Way Up" (Fat Joe and Remy Ma featuring French Montana and Infared)	2016	Eif Rivera
"Freaky Friday" (Lil Dicky featuring Chris Brown)	2018	Tony Yacenda

== Production discography ==
List of production and non-performing songwriting credits for other artists (excluding guest appearances, interpolations, and samples)
Track(s)	Year	Credit	Artist(s)	Album
4. "Connected"	1999	Producer	First Platoon	Connected
4. "Long Change"	2000	Producer (with DJ Nasty)	Fiend	Can I Burn?
1. "The Saga Continues"; (featuring G. Dep, Black Rob and Loon)	2001	Scratching	P. Diddy	The Saga Continues...
1. "Educated Fools"; (featuring Bounty Killer and Treach)	2001	Scratching	Damian Marley	Halfway Tree
1. "Nothing's Gonna Stop Me"	2004	Producer (as "Beat Novacane")	Terror Squad	True Story
8. "Yes Dem to Def"	2004	Producer (as "Beat Novacane")	Terror Squad	True Story
4. "Gangsta"	2004	Producer	Fabolous	Real Talk
13. "Melting Pot"; (featuring Trick Daddy)	2004	Producer	Pitbull	M.I.A.M.I.
"Lord You Know" (featuring Jaheim)	2004	Co-producer (with DJ Nasty & LVM)	Cam'ron	Non-album single
9. "Temptation Pt. 1"	2005	Producer	Fat Joe	All or Nothing
10. "Temptation Pt. 2"	2005	Producer	Fat Joe	All or Nothing
15. "Beat Novacane"	2005	Producer	Fat Joe	All or Nothing
16. "Family Affair"	2005	Producer	Ludacris, Shareefa, Lil' Fate, Playaz Circle, Field Mob, I-20 and NorfClk	Ludacris Presents: Disturbing tha Peace
2. "Reppin' Time"	2006	Producer (with The Runners)	Jim Jones	Jim Jones Presents: M.O.B.
1. "Intro"	2006	Producer	DJ Khaled	Listennn... the Album
5. "Problem"; (featuring Beanie Sigel and Jadakiss)	2006	Producer	DJ Khaled	Listennn... the Album
13. "Where You At"; (featuring Freeway and Clipse)	2006	Producer	DJ Khaled	Listennn... the Album
18. "I'm A G"	2006	Producer	Rick Ross	Port of Miami
"The Realist" (unused)	2006	Producer	Rick Ross	Port of Miami
"Be Somebody" (featuring Keyshia Cole)	2006	Producer	Dre	Non-album single
3. "The Profit"; (featuring Lil Wayne)	2006	Producer	Fat Joe	Me, Myself & I
12. "Story to Tell"	2006	Producer	Fat Joe	Me, Myself & I
1. "Intro (We the Best)"; (featuring Rick Ross)	2007	Producer	DJ Khaled	We the Best
—N/a	2007	Artists and repertoire (A&R)	Birdman	5 * Stunna
5. "Get It for Life"	2008	Producer	Fat Joe	The Elephant in the Room
7. "DJ Khaled Interlude"; (featuring DJ Khaled)	2008	Producer	Rick Ross	Trilla
1. "Standing on the Mountain Top"; (featuring Poo Bear and Ace Hood)	2008	Producer	DJ Khaled	We Global
—N/a	2008	Executive producer	Ace Hood	Gutta
6. "Cash Flow"; (featuring T-Pain and Rick Ross)	2008	Songwriter, additional vocals	Ace Hood	Gutta
—N/a	2009	Executive producer	Rick Ross	Deeper Than Rap
—N/a	2009	Executive producer	Ace Hood	Ruthless
—N/a	2010	A&R	Rick Ross	Teflon Don
2. "Welcome to My Hood"; (featuring Rick Ross, Plies, Lil Wayne and T-Pain)	2011	Producer (with The Renegades and DJ Nasty & LVM)	DJ Khaled	We the Best Forever
6. "Legendary"; (featuring Chris Brown, Keyshia Cole and Ne-Yo)	2011	Co-producer (with Tha Bizness, DJ Nasty & LVM and Gary Carolla)	DJ Khaled	We the Best Forever
12. "Welcome to My Hood (Remix)"; (featuring T-Pain, Ludacris, Busta Rhymes, Twista, Mavado, Birdman, Ace Hood, Fat Joe, the Game, Jadakiss, Bun B and Waka Flocka Flame)	2011	Producer (with The Renegades and DJ Nasty & LVM)	DJ Khaled	We the Best Forever
—N/a	2011	Executive producer	Ace Hood	Blood, Sweat & Tears
1. "Intro"	2011	Producer (as "Beat Novacane")	Ace Hood	The Statement 2
6. "Forgiv'n"	2011	Producer (as "Beat Novacane")	Ace Hood	The Statement 2
15. "BLAB (Ballin' Like a Bitch)"	2012	Songwriter	Ace Hood	Body Bag Volume 2
—N/a	2012	Executive producer	Rick Ross	God Forgives, I Don't
1. "Shout Out to the Real"; (featuring Meek Mill, Ace Hood and Plies)	2012	Producer (with Jahlil Beats)	DJ Khaled	Kiss the Ring
4. "Take It to the Head"; (featuring Rick Ross, Chris Brown, Nicki Minaj and Lil Wayne)	2012	Producer (with The Runners)	DJ Khaled	Kiss the Ring
6. "I'm So Blessed"; (featuring Big Sean, Wiz Khalifa, Ace Hood and T-Pain)	2012	Producer (with K.E. on the Track)	DJ Khaled	Kiss the Ring
—N/a	2013	Executive producer	Ace Hood	Trials & Tribulations
9. "Hope"	2013	Songwriter	Ace Hood	Trials & Tribulations
14. "Mama"; (featuring Betty Wright)	2013	Producer (with Cardiak)	Ace Hood	Trials & Tribulations
"Give It All to Me" (featuring Nicki Minaj)	2013	Songwriter	Mavado	Non-album single
2. "Suffering From Success"; (featuring Future and Ace Hood)	2013	Producer (with Young Chop and DJ Nasty & LVM)	DJ Khaled	Suffering from Success
4. "You Don't Want These Problems"; (featuring Big Sean, Rick Ross, French Montana, 2 Chainz, Meek Mill, Ace Hood and Timbaland)	2013	Producer (with Timbaland, DJ Nasty & LVM and Lee on the Beats)	DJ Khaled	Suffering from Success
7. "I'm Still"; (featuring Chris Brown, Wale, Wiz Khalifa and Ace Hood)	2013	Producer (with Lee on the Beats and Bkorn)	DJ Khaled	Suffering from Success
8. "I Wanna Be With You"; (featuring Nicki Minaj, Future and Rick Ross)	2013	Producer (with Lee on the Beats)	DJ Khaled	Suffering from Success
12. "Never Surrender"; (featuring Scarface, Jadakiss, Meek Mill, Akon, John Legend and Anthony Hamilton)	2013	Producer (with STREETRUNNER)	DJ Khaled	Suffering from Success
5. "2 Fingers"; (featuring Ace Hood and Kevin Cossom)	2014	Producer (with STREETRUNNER)	Vado	Sinatra
—N/a	2014	A&R	Rick Ross	Hood Billionaire
—N/a	2014	A&R	Rick Ross	Mastermind (Deluxe)
17. "Blessing in Disguise"; (featuring Scarface and Z-Ro)	2014	Co-producer (with STREETRUNNER and Vinny Vendito)	Rick Ross	Mastermind (Deluxe)
4. "All Eyes on You"; (featuring Chris Brown and Nicki Minaj)	2015	Co-producer (with Danny Morris, Alex Delicata, The Monarch, and Kevin Cossom)	Meek Mill	Dreams Worth More Than Money
12. "Bad For You"; (featuring Nicki Minaj)	2015	Songwriter	Meek Mill	Dreams Worth More Than Money
5. "Don't Mind"	2015	Producer (with Cool & Dre and Kent Jones)	Kent Jones	Tours
6. "Thug Love"; (featuring Jeremih)	2015	Songwriter	Chinx	Welcome to JFK
8. "On Your Body"; (featuring MeetSims)	2015	Songwriter	Chinx	Welcome to JFK
9. "Don't Mind Me"; (featuring MeetSims)	2015	Songwriter	Chinx	Welcome to JFK
2. "What U Want"	2015	Songwriter	PnB Rock	RNB3
4. "You Can See"; (featuring Future)	2015	Co-producer (with Dane Beats and Lee on the Beats)	Jadakiss	Top 5 Dead or Alive
—N/a	2015	A&R	Rick Ross	Black Market
1. "Free Enterprise"; (featuring John Legend)	2015	Producer (with Tarik Azouzz and StreetRunner)	Rick Ross	Black Market
3. "Down in the DM"	2016	Songwriter	Yo Gotti	The Art of Hustle
5. "Little Haiti Baby"	2016	Songwriter	Future	EVOL
11. "What Happened?"; (featuring Lil Wayne)	2016	Songwriter	2 Chainz	ColleGrove
3. "Ballerina"	2016	Songwriter	Belly	Another Day in Paradise
5. "You"; (featuring Kehlani)	2016	Songwriter	Belly	Another Day in Paradise
7. "Favorite Color"	2016	Songwriter	Belly	Another Day in Paradise
8. "God Bless"	2016	Songwriter	Belly	Another Day in Paradise
9. "Barely Sober"; (featuring Lil Wayne)	2016	Songwriter	Belly	Another Day in Paradise
11. "Zanzibar"; (featuring Juicy J)	2016	Songwriter	Belly	Another Day in Paradise
12. "Angels & Demons"; (featuring B-Real)	2016	Songwriter	Belly	Another Day in Paradise
3. "Meant to Be"; (featuring MeetSims)	2016	Songwriter	Chrisette Michele	Milestone
22. "The Lion Roars" (Note: Other sources list the song as track 6.)	2016	Songwriter	Stephen Marley	Revelation Pt. 2 - The Fruit of Life
"Alright"	2016	Songwriter	Kent Jones	Non-album single
9. "Stretch Marks"; (featuring Kent Jones)	2016	Songwriter	Kevin Hart	Kevin Hart: What Now? (The Mixtape Presents Chocolate Droppa)
3. "Trap Phone"; (featuring Jadakiss)	2016	Songwriter	Belly	Inzombia
4. "Frozen Water"; (featuring Future)	2016	Songwriter	Belly	Inzombia
7. "Outkast"; (featuring Ty Dolla Sign)	2016	Songwriter	Belly	Inzombia
9. "Seven Day Love"; (featuring Ashanti)	2016	Songwriter	Belly	Inzombia
8. "Lockjaw"; (featuring Kodak Black)	2016	Songwriter	French Montana	MC4, Montana
13. "Have Mercy"; (featuring Beanie Sigel, Jadakiss and Styles P)	2016	Producer (with Illa)	French Montana	MC4
"Wrong 4 This"	2017	Songwriter	Kristian Galva	Non-album single
1. "Rent Money"	2017	Producer (with the Beat Bully and Chef Tate)	Future	Future
"Sit Down" (featuring Ty Dolla Sign, Lil Dicky and E-40)	2017	Songwriter	Kent Jones	Non-album single
1. "Whiskey Eyes"; (featuring Chinx)	2017	Songwriter	French Montana	Jungle Rules
3. "Trippin"	2017	Songwriter	French Montana	Jungle Rules
2. "Change My Ways"	2017	Songwriter	Kodak Black	Project Baby 2
14. "Pride"	2017	Songwriter	Kodak Black	Project Baby 2
16. "No CoDefendant"	2017	Songwriter	Kodak Black	Project Baby 2
5. "Man Listen"	2017	Songwriter	Belly	Various artists – Madden NFL 18
6. "Bobby Brown"	2017	Songwriter	Belly	Mumble Rap
10. "P.O.P."	2017	Songwriter	Belly	Mumble Rap
11. "All Alone"	2017	Songwriter	Belly	Mumble Rap
2. "Back Gate"	2017	Songwriter	Yo Gotti	I Still Am
5. "Juice"	2017	Songwriter	Yo Gotti	I Still Am
7. "Save It for Me"; (featuring Chris Brown)	2017	Songwriter	Yo Gotti	I Still Am
8. "2908"	2017	Songwriter	Yo Gotti	I Still Am
13. "Around the World"	2017	Songwriter	Yo Gotti	I Still Am
"Used to Be"	2018	Songwriter	Gashi	Non-album single
7. "Burning Man"; (featuring Post Malone)	2018	Songwriter	watt	Various artists – XXX: Return of Xander Cage
"Merengue"	2018	Songwriter	Kent Jones	Non-album single
2. "I Believe"; (featuring Demi Lovato)	2018	Producer	DJ Khaled	Various artists – A Wrinkle in Time (soundtrack)
10. "That Shit Go"; (featuring Ty Dolla Sign)	2018	Songwriter	Poo Bear	Poo Bear Presents Bearthday Music
8. "Wanted You"; (featuring Lil Uzi Vert)	2018	Songwriter	Nav	Reckless
"Dinero" (featuring Cardi B and DJ Khaled)	2018	Producer (with Mohombi, Tommy Brown, Yei Gonzales and Scootie)	Jennifer Lopez	Non-album single
11. "Friend Like Me (End Title)"	2019	Producer (with Danja and Ben Billions)	Will Smith	Various artists – Aladdin (soundtrack)
13. "Til I'm Gone"; (featuring Kodak Black)	2019	Producer (with Ben Billions and Frank Dukes)	Flipp Dinero	Love for Guala
12. "Mood 4 Eva"; (featuring Oumou Sangaré)	2020	Producer (with Danja, Just Blaze, Jeff Kleinman, Michael Uzowuru, and Teo Halm)	Beyoncé, Jay-Z and Childish Gambino	Various artists – The Lion King: The Gift
5. "Amazing"; (featuring DJ Khaled)	2022	Producer (with STREETRUNNER and Tarik Azzouz)	Mary J. Blige	Good Morning Gorgeous
5. "Gone Forever"; (featuring Remy Ma and DJ Khaled)	2022	Producer (with Ben Billions, STREETRUNNER, and Tarik Azzouz)	Mary J. Blige	Good Morning Gorgeous (Deluxe)
13. "WE FIND A WAY"	2023	Producer (with Jermaine J'August Reid and STREETRUNNER)	Buju Banton	Born for Greatness
6. "Never Again (Interlude)"	2023	Songwriter, additional vocals	Sonny Digital	Dolores Son
9. "Above the Law"; (featuring Teyana Taylor and DJ Khaled)	2023	Producer (as "Beat Novacane")	Meek Mill, Rick Ross	Too Good to Be True
9. "Paradise"; (with Anitta and DJ Khaled)	2024	Producer	Fat Joe	The World Changed On Me
