= I Did It (DJ Khaled song) =

2021 single by DJ Khaled

Single by DJ Khaled featuring Post Malone, Megan Thee Stallion, Lil Baby and DaBaby

from the album Khaled Khaled
- Released: May 21, 2021
- Length: 2:45
- Label: We the Best; Epic
- Songwriters: Khaled Khaled; Austin Post; Megan Pete; Dominique Jones; Jonathan Kirk; Brittany Coney; Denisa Andrews; Joseph Zarrillo; Omed Rozbayani; Eric Clapton; James Gordon
- Producers: DJ Khaled; DJ 360; Joe Zarrillo

DJ Khaled singles chronology
"Every Chance I Get" (2021)	"I Did It" (2021)	"Body in Motion" (2021)

Post Malone singles chronology
"Life's a Mess II" (2021)	"I Did It" (2021)	"Motley Crew" (2021)

Megan Thee Stallion singles chronology
"On Me (Remix)" (2021)	"I Did It" (2021)	"Bad Bitches" (2021)

Lil Baby singles chronology
"Every Chance I Get" (2021)	"I Did It" (2021)	"Voice of the Heroes" (2021)

DaBaby singles chronology
"Girl From Rio (Remix)" (2021)	"I Did It" (2021)	"Get Fly" (2021)

Music video
- "I Did It" on YouTube

"I Did It" is a song by American DJ and record producer DJ Khaled featuring American rappers Post Malone, Megan Thee Stallion, Lil Baby, and DaBaby. The song was serviced to UK radio on May 21, 2021 and US radio on June 1, 2021, as the fourth single from Khaled's twelfth studio album, Khaled Khaled. It samples the 1970 song "Layla" by Derek and the Dominos. The music video was released on May 27, 2021, and is directed by Dave Meyers.

== Background ==
Prior to the album's release, DJ Khaled declared that the song would become an anthem: "It's one of those records where, like, after a Super Bowl win, or an NBA championship, any accomplishment. The last time I felt like this was 'All I Do Is Win'".

"I Did It" samples Derek and the Dominos' 1970 song "Layla", in particular the guitar riff performed by Duane Allman.

== Critical reception ==
Stereogum's Chris De Ville positioned it eleventh in their ranking of songs from Khaled Khaled, stating: "In theory, an all-star posse cut with Post Malone singing over the 'Layla' guitar riff should be a slam dunk. But the hulking, sputtering beat takes all the drama out of Duane Allman's classic riff, and the verses land like formalities. Worst of all, Posty is basically unrecognizable and unmemorable". Variety's A.D Amorosi shared a similar sentiment: "Even the Derek and the Dominoes' rock-out sample that kicks off the chic, aggressive 'I Did It' with an un-AutoTuned Post Malone singing out strong and full bodied (a rarity on his own records) sounds as if Khaled tailored his tone to suit the vocalist, rather than his usual other-way-around". Clash's Robin Murray said the song "supplies a real golden moment", calling it a "fiery team up". Steve Juon of Rap Reviews criticized the sample for being "overly familiar and easy to pick out immediately", opining that "a little subtlety in selection goes a long way". Luke Fox of Exclaim! called the song "compelling", and said each artist "take turns splashing quick, personality-drenched verses.

== Charts ==
Chart performance for "I Did It"
Chart (2021)	Peak position
Australia (ARIA)	99
Canada Hot 100 (Billboard)	22
Canada CHR/Top 40 (Billboard)	34
Global 200 (Billboard)	33
Ireland (IRMA)	48
Lithuania (AGATA)	78
New Zealand Hot Singles (RMNZ)	7
Norway (VG-lista)	39
Portugal (AFP)	106
Sweden (Sverigetopplistan)	50
Switzerland (Schweizer Hitparade)	85
UK Singles (Official Charts)	53
US Billboard Hot 100	43
US Hot R&B/Hip-Hop Songs (Billboard)	17
US Pop Airplay (Billboard)	28
US Rhythmic Airplay (Billboard)	20
US Rolling Stone Top 100	17

== Certifications ==
Certifications for "I Did It"
Region	Certification	Certified units/sales
United States (RIAA)	Gold	500,000^{‡}
^{‡} Sales+streaming figures based on certification alone.

== Release history ==
Release dates and formats for "I Did It"
Region	Date	Format	Label	Ref.
United Kingdom	May 21, 2021	Rhythmic contemporary	We the Best; Epic	
United States	June 1, 2021	Contemporary hit radio	We the Best; Epic	
United States	June 1, 2021	Rhythmic contemporary	We the Best; Epic	
