= Every Chance I Get (song) =

2021 single by DJ Khaled featuring Lil Baby and Lil Durk

Single by DJ Khaled featuring Lil Baby and Lil Durk

from the album Khaled Khaled
- Released: May 11, 2021
- Genre: Trap
- Length: 3:57
- Label: We the Best; Epic
- Songwriters: Khaled Khaled; Dominique Jones; Durk Banks; Brytavious Chambers
- Producers: DJ Khaled; Tay Keith

DJ Khaled singles chronology
"Let It Go" (2021)	"Every Chance I Get" (2021)	"I Did It" (2021)

Lil Baby singles chronology
"Ramen & OJ" (2021)	"Every Chance I Get" (2021)	"I Did It" (2021)

Lil Durk singles chronology
"No Statements" (2021)	"Every Chance I Get" (2021)	"Quarantine in Houston" (2021)

Music video
- "Every Chance I Get" on YouTube

"Every Chance I Get" (stylized in all caps) is a song by American record producer DJ Khaled featuring American rappers Lil Baby and Lil Durk. It was sent to rhythmic contemporary radio as the third single off the former's twelfth studio album, Khaled Khaled, on May 11, 2021. The song received mostly positive responses from critics, with some deeming it a highlight off the album. Lyrically, it sees the rappers boasting about their successes.

== Background and composition ==
According to Khaled, Durk sent his verse back the same day Khaled sent him the track. Although Baby and Durk had been teasing a collaborative album, which would later be revealed to be titled The Voice of the Heroes and released on June 4, 2021, Khaled said that he had "Every Chance I Get" long before the duo were planning on working together. The song is one of three tracks off Khaled Khaled to feature Lil Baby, along with "I Did It" and "Body in Motion". Baby also appeared on Khaled's 2019's album Father of Asahd, on the track "You Stay".

A trap-infused song, it sees the rappers delivering fast-paced flows and braggadocious lyrics, trading verses about "stunting" on their enemies, street life, women, and wealth. Baby performs the first and second verse as well as the chorus, while Durk does the third and final verse.

== Critical reception ==
In their album review, Rolling Stone's Jeff Ihaza named the song one of the "shining moments" on the album, praising Baby and Durk's "explosive bars", and said they "are operating at a new peak". Clash's Robin Murray agreed, calling it a "real golden moment" on Khaled Khaled. NME's Luke Morgan Britton singled out Lil Baby for delivering a "standout" feature, stating that it shows "why he's one of the most effortless rappers right now". Stereogum's Chris DeVille ranked the song as the second-best on the album, stating: "Sometimes it's as easy as throwing two of the most reliably compelling sing-rap stars in the game over a thundering Tay Keith production". Mitch Findlay of HotNewHipHop called the song a highlight off the album, writing: "Though it should no longer be expected to see a rapper bringing their A-game to a DJ Khaled project (the days of 'We Takin Over' are, alas, over), Lil Baby and Durk bring the passion that has come to be associated with their brand". Complex's Eric Skelton said the song is a good preview of Baby and Durk's collaborative album: "Pulling off the best rap collaboration on the whole album, their chemistry is undeniable as Durk punctuates the end of each of Baby's verses by singing, 'Yeah, yeah, yeah, yeah, yeah'". Conversely, Variety's A.D Amorosi called the song turgid and said it "goes nowhere".

== Accolades ==
Awards and nominations for "Every Chance I Get"
Year	Organization	Award	Result	Ref(s)
2021	MTV Video Music Awards	Song of Summer	Nominated	

== Music video ==
The song's official video was released on May 4, 2021, directed by Joseph Kahn. Set in a fiery CGI backdrop, it features an array of expensive cars and video vixens. As Lamborghinis start burning and lightning strikes, the artists turn the chaos into a party. Mike Winslow of AllHipHop noted the video "emphasizes gritty cinematic scenes with pyrotechnics in an urban environment".

== Charts ==
=== Weekly charts ===
Weekly chart performance for "Every Chance I Get"
Chart (2021)	Peak position
Canada Hot 100 (Billboard)	25
Global 200 (Billboard)	27
New Zealand Hot Singles (RMNZ)	14
UK Singles (Official Charts)	73
US Billboard Hot 100	20
US Hot R&B/Hip-Hop Songs (Billboard)	6
US Rhythmic Airplay (Billboard)	3
US Rolling Stone Top 100	10

=== Year-end charts ===
Year-end chart performance for "Every Chance I Get"
Chart (2021)	Position
US Billboard Hot 100	59
US Hot R&B/Hip-Hop Songs (Billboard)	25
US Rhythmic (Billboard)	30

== Certifications ==
Certifications for "Every Chance I Get"
Region	Certification	Certified units/sales
New Zealand (RMNZ)	Gold	15,000^{‡}
United Kingdom (BPI)	Silver	200,000^{‡}
United States (RIAA)	6× Platinum	6,000,000^{‡}
^{‡} Sales+streaming figures based on certification alone.

== Release history ==
Country	Date	Format	Label	Ref.
Various	April 30, 2021	Digital download; streaming	Epic; We the Best	
United States	May 11, 2021	Rhythmic radio	Epic; We the Best	
