= Popstar (DJ Khaled song) =

2020 single by DJ Khaled featuring Drake

Single by DJ Khaled featuring Drake

from the album Khaled Khaled
- B-side: "Greece"
- Released: July 17, 2020
- Recorded: 2020
- Genre: Hip hop; trap
- Length: 3:20
- Label: OVO; We the Best; Epic
- Songwriters: Khaled Khaled; Aubrey Graham; Ozan Yildirim; David Ruoff; Elias Klughammer
- Producers: OZ; David & Eli; DJ Khaled

DJ Khaled singles chronology
"Important" (2020)	"Popstar" (2020)	"Sunshine (The Light)" (2021)

Drake singles chronology
"Toosie Slide" (2020)	"Popstar" / "Greece" (2020)	"Only You Freestyle" (2020)

"Popstar" (stylized in all caps) is a song by American record producer DJ Khaled, featuring Canadian rapper Drake. It was released on July 17, 2020, simultaneously with their other collaboration "Greece", as the dual lead singles from Khaled's twelfth studio album, Khaled Khaled. Both songs were produced by frequent Drake collaborator OZ. It marked the sixth and seventh collaborations between Khaled and Drake, and their first since 2017's "To the Max". The mid-tempo "Popstar" sees Drake boasting about being the "popstar" of the generation. The song proved to be more successful than "Greece", debuting at number three on the Billboard Hot 100, and number-one in Drake's native Canada.

== Background ==
In January 2020, Khaled flew to Drake's hometown Toronto where they spent time together in the studio. In June, he teased a Drake collaboration on his Instagram, captioning various posts with emojis of a key and owl, the mascot of Drake's OVO label. He further revealed that "the first single been ready" and confirmed that he was working on a new album. After fans inundated Khaled with questions on the Drake references, he said fans would have to wait a little longer for new music. In early July, Khaled confirmed that Drake was on his new album. On July 15, a day before the song's release, Khaled announced his 12th studio album would be titled Khaled Khaled. He also announced two Drake collaborations would be released on July 17, "Popstar" and "Greece". DJ Khaled and Drake have collaborated various times, first in 2009 with "Fed Up", and during the 2010s, on "I'm On One", "No New Friends", "For Free" and "To the Max".

Produced by OZ, he previously produced Drake's "Toosie Slide" and several tracks on his Dark Lane Demo Tapes mixtape.

== Composition ==
Producer OZ created the beat on July 23, 2019, and then used a loop by German production duo David x Eli, to take the track to "the next level". The reggae-tinged song contains "moody" production, with a hard, "woozy" beat. Drake's "tight syllables" include lyrics about vacationing in the tropical island Turks and Caicos, which he also referenced on the songs "Omertà" (2019) and "Pain 1993" (2020). He also boasts about his status as the "popstar" of the generation, while name-dropping Scooter Braun, Rihanna, Ariana Grande, Selena Gomez, David Foster, and Justin Bieber. Complex's Eric Skelton said Drake's style on the song "may have drawn inspiration" from rappers Valee and Baby Keem. Valee's manager Andrew Barber tweeted that Drake replicated Valee's flow on his 2018 track "Womp Womp".

== Critical reception ==
The New York Times' Jon Caramanica called the song a "string of ruminative tough talk", and opined "when he raps like this, with a stream of boastfulness, it's often an ego-clearing amuse bouche for a more ambitious release to follow". Rolling Stone's Charles Holmes complimented the song's star quality, stating: "It's a blunt object of a song that seems willing to forgo anything resembling subtlety". Billboard's Michael Saponara labelled the song "Instagram caption-friendly", and said it oozes with "song of the summer potential".

== Music video ==
With the announcement on the songs, Khaled posted a trailer for the song's video, co-starring Spanish actor Jordi Mollà.

The music video was released on Khaled's YouTube channel on September 3, 2020. The video stars fellow Canadian singer Justin Bieber, replacing Drake and Khaled due to the latter being busy. However, Drake does appear at the beginning of the video, as the video opens up with Drake showing his acting abilities as he receives countless video messages from Khaled, who asks him to appear in the video for the song. Drake, left speechless, then starts to show frustration towards Khaled's constant nagging and hassling. While in his home country of Canada, Drake then calls Bieber to appear in the video for both him and Khaled. The video also features cameos from Scooter Braun, as well as King Bach, Timothy DeLaGhetto, and Bieber's wife, Hailey Bieber. An edited version removing the intro was also posted on Bieber's YouTube channel.

== Chart performance ==
"Popstar" and "Greece" debuted at numbers three and eight on the Billboard Hot 100, respectively, becoming Drake's record-extending 24th and 25th debuts in the Hot 100's top 10. It also marked his 39th and 40th Hot 100 top ten entries, breaking Madonna's 18-year record. The song reached number one in Drake's native Canada, debuting at the top of the Canadian Hot 100, becoming Khaled's second number one after "I'm The One".

== Awards and nominations ==
Year	Organization	Award	Result	Ref.
2020	MTV Europe Music Awards	Best Video	Won	
2020	MTV Video Music Awards	Song of Summer	Nominated	
2021	MTV Video Music Awards	Video of the Year	Nominated	
2021	MTV Video Music Awards	Best Direction	Nominated	

== Charts ==
=== Weekly charts ===
Chart (2020)	Peak position
Australia (ARIA)	10
Austria (Ö3 Austria Top 40)	29
Belgium (Ultratip Bubbling Under Flanders)	12
Belgium (Ultratip Bubbling Under Wallonia)	39
Canada Hot 100 (Billboard)	1
Czech Republic Singles Digital (ČNS IFPI)	31
Denmark (Tracklisten)	26
France (SNEP)	101
Germany (GfK)	36
Global 200 (Billboard)	11
Greece (IFPI)	8
Hungary (Single Top 40)	25
Hungary (Stream Top 40)	18
Iceland (Tónlistinn)	30
Ireland (IRMA)	14
Italy (FIMI)	42
Netherlands (Single Top 100)	42
New Zealand (Recorded Music NZ)	17
Norway (VG-lista)	25
Portugal (AFP)	16
Romania (Airplay 100)	62
Scottish Singles Sales (Official Charts)	43
Slovakia Singles Digital (ČNS IFPI)	8
Sweden (Sverigetopplistan)	33
Switzerland (Schweizer Hitparade)	18
UK Singles (Official Charts)	11
US Billboard Hot 100	3
US Hot R&B/Hip-Hop Songs (Billboard)	3
US Pop Airplay (Billboard)	28
US Rhythmic Airplay (Billboard)	1
US Rolling Stone Top 100	1

=== Year-end charts ===
Chart (2020)	Position
Canada (Canadian Hot 100)	52
Hungary (Stream Top 40)	88
Portugal (AFP)	122
Switzerland (Schweizer Hitparade)	98
US Billboard Hot 100	66
US Hot R&B/Hip-Hop Songs (Billboard)	34
US Rhythmic (Billboard)	27

== Certifications ==
Region	Certification	Certified units/sales
Australia (ARIA)	2× Platinum	140,000^{‡}
Austria (IFPI Austria)	Gold	15,000^{‡}
Brazil (Pro-Música Brasil)	2× Platinum	80,000^{‡}
Canada (Music Canada)	Platinum	80,000^{‡}
Denmark (IFPI Danmark)	Gold	45,000^{‡}
France (SNEP)	Gold	100,000^{‡}
Italy (FIMI)	Platinum	100,000^{‡}
Mexico (AMPROFON)	2× Platinum+Gold	150,000^{‡}
New Zealand (RMNZ)	2× Platinum	60,000^{‡}
Poland (ZPAV)	Gold	10,000^{‡}
Portugal (AFP)	Platinum	10,000^{‡}
Spain (Promusicae)	Gold	30,000^{‡}
Switzerland (IFPI Switzerland)	Gold	10,000^{‡}
United Kingdom (BPI)	Gold	400,000^{‡}
United States (RIAA)	4× Platinum	4,000,000^{‡}
Streaming
Greece (IFPI Greece)	Gold	1,000,000^{†}
^{‡} Sales+streaming figures based on certification alone.^{†} Streaming-only figures based on certification alone.
