= Body in Motion =

2021 single by DJ Khaled featuring Bryson Tiller, Lil Baby, and Roddy Ricch

Single by DJ Khaled featuring Bryson Tiller, Lil Baby, and Roddy Ricch

from the album Khaled Khaled
- Released: September 14, 2021
- Genre: R&B
- Length: 5:06
- Label: We the Best; Epic
- Songwriters: Khaled Khaled; Bryson Tiller; Dominique Jones; Rodrick Moore, Jr.; Kevin Cossom
- Producers: DJ Khaled; StreetRunner; Tarik Azzouz

DJ Khaled singles chronology
"I Did It" (2021)	"Body in Motion" (2021)

Bryson Tiller singles chronology
"Pull Up" (2021)	"Body in Motion" (2021)	"Gotta Move On" (2022)

Lil Baby singles chronology
"Rich All My Life" (2021)	"Body in Motion" (2021)	"Hurricane" (2021)

Roddy Ricch singles chronology
"Late at Night" (2021)	"Body in Motion" (2021)	"LEMME FIND OUT" (2021)

Music video
- "Body in Motion" on YouTube

"Body in Motion" (stylized in all caps) is a song by American record producer DJ Khaled featuring American musicians Bryson Tiller, Lil Baby, and Roddy Ricch. The song was serviced to US rhythmic radio on September 14, 2021, as the fifth single from Khaled's twelfth studio album, Khaled Khaled. Produced by Khaled, StreetRunner, and Tarik Azzouz, the four artists wrote the song alongside Kevin Cossom.

== Background ==
Prior to the album's release, DJ Khaled shared his thoughts on collaborating with Roddy Ricch for "Body in Motion": "He's a young icon. When the vocals came in, I lost my mind. We ended up making something incredible". On August 23, 2021, Khaled announced that the song would be sent to radio soon to serve as the next single from his Khaled Khaled album.

== Critical reception ==
Luke Morgan Britton from NME praised Lil Baby's appearances on Khaled Khaled, writing: "Lil Baby shows why he's one of the most effortless rappers right now with standout features on the trappy 'Every Chance I Get' and R&B-smoothy 'Body In Motion'".

== Music video ==
The music video for the song was released on May 18, 2021. It was filmed in Miami, Florida, where Khaled resides. The video sees all artists on a yacht, surrounded by semi-nude women in bikinis and bathing suits. Khaled's longtime friend, American rapper Fat Joe, makes a cameo appearance. The video was released to celebrate the song's parent album, Khaled Khaled, being certified gold by the Recording Industry Association of America (RIAA) the day before.

== Charts ==
Chart performance for "Body in Motion"
Chart (2021)	Peak position
Canada Hot 100 (Billboard)	66
Global 200 (Billboard)	96
New Zealand Hot Singles (RMNZ)	16
US Billboard Hot 100	79
US Hot R&B/Hip-Hop Songs (Billboard)	33
US Rhythmic Airplay (Billboard)	23
US Rolling Stone Top 100	42

== Certifications ==
Certifications for "Body in Motion"
Region	Certification	Certified units/sales
United States (RIAA)	Gold	500,000^{‡}
^{‡} Sales+streaming figures based on certification alone.

== Release history ==
Country	Date	Format	Label	Ref.
Various	April 30, 2021	Digital download; streaming	We the Best; Epic	
United States	September 14, 2021	Rhythmic radio	We the Best; Epic	
