= Pride N Joy =

2012 music single

Single by Fat Joe featuring Kanye West, Miguel, Jadakiss, Mos Def, DJ Khaled, Roscoe Dash and Busta Rhymes
- Released: May 23, 2012
- Genre: Hip hop
- Length: 5:04 (remix version); 3:04 (single version)
- Label: R4 So Valid
- Songwriters: Joseph Cartagena; Kanye Omari West; Roosevelt Harrell III; Richard Butler; Jeffrey Johnson
- Producer: Bink!

Fat Joe singles chronology
"Another Round" (2011)	"Pride N Joy" (2012)	"Instagram That Hoe" (2012)

Kanye West singles chronology
"Cold" (2012)	"Pride N Joy" (2012)	"I Wish You Would" (2012)

Miguel singles chronology
"Lotus Flower Bomb" (2011)	"Pride N Joy" (2012)	"Adorn" (2012)

Roscoe Dash singles chronology
"Into The Morning" (2012)	"Pride N Joy" (2012)	"Snapbacks & Tattoos (Remix)" (2012)

DJ Khaled singles chronology
"Cold" (2012)	"Pride N Joy" (2012)	"I Wish You Would" (2012)

Busta Rhymes singles chronology
"Why Stop Now" (2011)	"Pride N Joy" (2012)	"Take You There" (2012)

Jadakiss singles chronology
"It's Good" (2011)	"Pride N Joy" (2012)	"Irregular Heartbeat" (2014)

Mos Def singles chronology
"Just Begun" (2010)	"Pride N Joy" (2012)	"Sensei on the Block" (2015)

"Pride N Joy" is a song by American rapper Fat Joe. The song features Kanye West, Miguel, Jadakiss, Mos Def, DJ Khaled, Roscoe Dash and Busta Rhymes. The song was produced by Bink! and contains additional songwriting from singer Rico Love. According to Joe, the record had been mixed eight times by West before its release.

== Music video ==
The music video was directed by Hype Williams and premiered August 26, 2012 on MTV Jams as the Jam of The Week. Mos Def was not available when the video was shot, so Ashanti took his place.

== Remix ==
The official remix was released on September 17, 2012. The remix features Trey Songz, Pusha T, Ashanti and Miguel.

== Track listing ==
1. "Pride N Joy" (radio version)
2. "Pride N Joy" (explicit version)

== Charts ==
Chart (2012)	Peak position
US Hot R&B/Hip-Hop Songs (Billboard)	81
