= Khaled Khaled =

Studio album by DJ Khaled
- Released: April 30, 2021
- Genre: Hip-hop
- Length: 53:45
- Label: We the Best; Epic
- Producer: DJ Khaled; 9th Wonder; Cool & Dre; Kent Jones; Oz; StreetRunner; Tarik Azzouz; Tay Keith; Tiggi; DJ 360

DJ Khaled chronology
Father of Asahd (2019)	Khaled Khaled (2021)	God Did (2022)

Singles from Khaled Khaled
- 1. "Popstar" / "Greece" Released: July 17, 2020; 2. "Let It Go" Released: May 10, 2021; 3. "Every Chance I Get" Released: May 11, 2021; 4. "I Did It" Released: May 21, 2021; 5. "Body in Motion" Released: September 14, 2021

Khaled Khaled (stylized in all caps) is the twelfth studio album by American disc jockey and record producer DJ Khaled. It was released on April 30, 2021, by We the Best Music Group and Epic Records. The album features guest appearances from Lil Wayne, Jeremih, Lil Baby, Lil Durk, Cardi B, H.E.R., Migos, Post Malone, Megan Thee Stallion, DaBaby, Justin Bieber, 21 Savage, Bryson Tiller, Roddy Ricch, Drake, A Boogie wit da Hoodie, Big Sean, Rick Ross, Puff Daddy, Nas, Jay-Z, James Fauntleroy, Justin Timberlake, Meek Mill, Buju Banton, Capleton, and Bounty Killer.

== Background ==
The title of the album is named after Khaled's real name, Khaled Khaled. It was executive produced by himself, his respective first and second children and sons, Asahd and Aalam Tuck Khaled, with Allah also being credited as an executive producer due to the Khaled family's religious beliefs and spirituality in Islam. Khaled Khaled is the first album by Khaled to be released since the birth of Aalam, his second child, on January 20, 2020. Khaled also played songs from the album to American rapper Kanye West, who came to his house days before it was released. On April 29, 2021, in an interview with Chelsea Briggs of Billboard, Khaled said that he hopes that the album will help his fans "to be inspired, motivated, but I want them to be great" and "don't hold back your greatness, don't let nobody stop the vision, but move with love", and stated that the latter takeaway is the most important part.

== Release and promotion ==
On July 15, 2020, Khaled announced the title of the album alongside the titles and respective song artworks for its dual lead singles, "Popstar" and "Greece", both of which feature Canadian rapper Drake, which were released two days later. Khaled had originally planned to release it sometime in the third or fourth quarter of 2020, but did not for unknown reasons. He teased most of the collaborations on the album before since he announced it. On April 27, 2021, he shared the album artwork and announced its release date. The following day, he revealed its track listing, while also teasing the ninth track from the album, "Sorry Not Sorry", which features American rappers Nas and Jay-Z and American singer-songwriter James Fauntleroy. American singer Beyoncé appears as part of the Hive. He revealed an updated track listing that added the track "Big Paper", which features American rapper Cardi B, which was not on the previous track listing.

== Singles ==
DJ Khaled released the dual lead singles of the album, "Popstar" and "Greece", both of which feature Canadian rapper and singer Drake, on July 17, 2020. The second single, "Let It Go", which features Canadian singer Justin Bieber and Atlanta-based rapper 21 Savage, was released on May 10, 2021. The third single, "Every Chance I Get", which features American rappers Lil Baby and Lil Durk, was sent to US rhythmic contemporary radio one day later, May 11, 2021. The fourth single, "I Did It", which features American singer Post Malone and American rappers Megan Thee Stallion, Lil Baby, and DaBaby, was sent to UK rhythmic contemporary radio on May 21, 2021 and US contemporary hit radio on June 1, 2021. The fifth single, "Body in Motion", which features American singer Bryson Tiller and American rappers Lil Baby and Roddy Ricch, was sent to rhythmic contemporary radio on September 14, 2021.

== Critical reception ==
Professional ratings
Aggregate scores
Source	Rating
Metacritic	58/100
Review scores
Source	Rating
AllMusic	2.5/5 stars
Clash	8/10
Exclaim!	6/10
HipHopDX	2.4/5
NME	3/5 stars
Pitchfork	4.8/10
RapReviews.com	6.5/10
Variety	(favorable)

Khaled Khaled was met with mixed reviews from music critics. At Metacritic, which assigns a normalized rating out of 100 to reviews from professional publications, the album received an average score of 58 based on eight reviews, indicating "mixed or average reviews".

A few days before the album's release, Chris Deville of Stereogum opined that the "extravagant list of guest stars" on it "feels especially indulgent" and "it's not just that Khaled Khaled seems predestined to be an event album nearly every track seems like it could be a breakout hit based on the lineup of performers alone". In a lukewarm three-star review, NME's Luke Morgan Britton wrote: "This is a slightly hollow, glitzy blockbuster of an album, and we could well be reaching Brand Khaled fatigue very soon. But for now, and after endless hits and three Platinum albums, you can forgive him for refusing to change the blueprint." Of the album's lengthy guest list, Britton said: "If you swapped numbers with Khaled at an after-party and aren't on this album, you should feel offended."

== Commercial performance ==
Khaled Khaled debuted at number one on the US Billboard 200 chart, earning 93,000 album-equivalent units (including 14,000 copies in pure album sales) in its first week. This became DJ Khaled's third US number one album on the chart. The album also accumulated a total of 106.87 million on-demand streams of the album's songs. On February 23, 2022, the album was certified platinum by the Recording Industry Association of America (RIAA) for combined sales and album-equivalent units of over 1,000,000 units in the United States.

== Track listing ==
Khaled Khaled track listing
No.	Title	Writer(s)	Producer(s)	Length
1.	"Thankful" (featuring Lil Wayne and Jeremih)	Khaled Khaled; Dwayne Carter, Jr.; Jeremy Felton; Brittany Coney; Denisia Andrews	DJ Khaled	5:38
2.	"Every Chance I Get" (featuring Lil Baby and Lil Durk)	Khaled; Dominique Jones; Durk Banks; Brytavious Chambers	DJ Khaled; Tay Keith	3:56
3.	"Big Paper" (featuring Cardi B)	Khaled; Belcalis Almanzar; Chambers; Torae Carr; Jonathan Descartes	DJ Khaled; Tay Keith	2:39
4.	"We Going Crazy" (featuring H.E.R. and Migos)	Khaled; Gabriella Wilson; Quavious Marshall; Kirshnik Ball; Kiari Cephus; Marcello Valenzano; Andre Lyon; Daryl Jones	DJ Khaled; Cool & Dre; Kent Jones	3:16
5.	"I Did It" (featuring Post Malone, Megan Thee Stallion, Lil Baby, and DaBaby)	Khaled; Austin Post; Megan Pete; Do. Jones; Jonathan Kirk; Coney; Andrews	DJ Khaled; DJ 360; Joe Zarrillo	2:45
6.	"Let It Go" (featuring Justin Bieber and 21 Savage)	Khaled; Justin Bieber; Shayaa Abraham-Joseph; Edgar Ferrera	DJ Khaled	2:45
7.	"Body in Motion" (featuring Bryson Tiller, Lil Baby, and Roddy Ricch)	Khaled; Bryson Tiller; Do. Jones; Rodrick Moore, Jr.; Kevin Cossom	DJ Khaled; StreetRunner; Tarik Azzouz	5:06
8.	"Popstar" (featuring Drake)	Khaled; Aubrey Graham; Ozan Yildirim; David Ruoff; Elias Klughammer	DJ Khaled; OZ; David & Eli	3:20
9.	"This Is My Year" (featuring A Boogie wit da Hoodie, Big Sean, Rick Ross, and Puff Daddy)	Khaled; Artist Dubose; Sean Anderson; William Roberts II; Sean Combs; Nicholas Warwar; Tarik Azzouz	DJ Khaled; StreetRunner; Tarik Azzouz	4:27
10.	"Sorry Not Sorry" (featuring Nas, Jay-Z, and James Fauntleroy)	Khaled; Nasir Jones; Shawn Carter; James Fauntleroy II; Beyoncé Knowles-Carter; Cossom	DJ Khaled; StreetRunner; Tarik Azzouz	4:18
11.	"Just Be" (featuring Justin Timberlake)	Khaled; Justin Timberlake; Coney; Andrews; Warwar; Azzouz	DJ Khaled; StreetRunner; Tarik Azzouz	3:44
12.	"I Can Have It All" (featuring Bryson Tiller, H.E.R., and Meek Mill)	Khaled; Tiller; Wilson; Robert Williams; Coney; Andrews; Warwar; Azzouz	DJ Khaled; StreetRunner; Tarik Azzouz	4:30
13.	"Greece" (featuring Drake)	Khaled; Graham; Yildirim; Calvin Tarvin; Elijah Maynard; Peter Eddins	OZ; Tiggi; DJ Khaled	3:39
14.	"Where You Come From" (featuring Buju Banton, Capleton, and Bounty Killer)	Khaled; Mark Myrie; Clifton Bailey III; Rodney Price; Patrick Douthit; Warwar; Azzouz	DJ Khaled; 9th Wonder; StreetRunner; Tarik Azzouz	3:42
Total length:				53:45

Sample credits

- "Thankful" contains a sample of Ain't No Love in the Heart of the City, performed by Bobby "Blue" Bland, which American rapper JAY-Z sampled for his song Heart of the City.
- "We Going Crazy" contains a sample of Children of the Sun, performed by Mandrill.
- "I Did It" contains a guitar riff sample from Layla, performed by Derek and the Dominos.
- "This Is My Year" contains interpolations of Long Kiss Goodnight, performed by The Notorious B.I.G.
- "Just Be" contains a sample of All That I Got Is You, performed by Ghostface Killah and Mary J. Blige, which is built around the song Maybe Tomorrow, performed by The Jackson 5.
- "I Can Have It All" contains a sample of Whole Lotta Something Goin' On, performed by Raphael Ravenscroft.
- "Where You Come From" contains a sample of Under Mi Sensi, performed by Barrington Levy.

Notes

- ^{^[a]} signifies a co-producer
- All tracks are stylized in all caps.
- "Sorry Not Sorry" contains additional vocals from Beyoncé, who is credited as "Harmonies by the Hive".
- "I Can Have It All" also appears on H.E.R.'s debut studio album, Back of My Mind (2021), with DJ Khaled and Bryson Tiller being credited as featured artists; however, Meek Mill is not credited, but his verse is still present on that version.

== Personnel ==
Technical

- Chris Athens – mastering
- Mike Dean – mastering, mixing (track 5)
- Manny Marroquin – mixing (1–7, 9–14)
- Chris Galland – mixing (1, 5), engineering assistance (2–4, 6, 7, 9–12, 14)
- Jeremie Inhaber – mixing (6, 7, 14), engineering assistance (1–5, 9–12)
- Derek Ali – mixing (7)
- Raymond "Cino" Argueta – mixing (7), engineering (10)
- 40 – mixing (8, 13)
- AyoJuan – engineering (1–7, 9–12, 14), vocal engineering (8, 13)
- Ed1dmc – engineering (1)
- Manny Galvez – engineering (1)
- Darth "Denver" Moon – engineering (2)
- Mattazik Muzik – engineering (2, 5, 7)
- Evan LaRay – engineering (3)
- Smitty Beatz – engineering (4)
- DJ Durel – engineering (4)
- Luis Bordeaux – engineering (4, 12)
- Nick Mac – engineering (5)
- Heidi Wang – engineering (6)
- Elijah Marrett-Hitch – engineering (6)
- Josh Gudwin – engineering (6)
- Bryson Tiller – engineering (7)
- Chris Dennis – engineering (7)
- Noel Cadastre – engineering (8, 13)
- Alex Estevez – engineering (9)
- Roark Bailey – engineering (9)
- Thomas Tomcat Bennett – engineering (9)
- Tom Kahre – engineering (9)
- David Kim – engineering (10)
- Gabriel Zardes – engineering (10)
- Young Guru – engineering (10)
- Chris Godbey – engineering (11)
- Anthony Cruz – engineering (12)
- Jermaine J August Reid – engineering (14)
- Orette Howell – engineering (14)
- Taj-Vaughn Johnson – engineering (14)
- Dave Huffman – engineering assistance
- Anthony Vilchis – engineering assistance (1–7, 9–12, 14)
- Zach Pereyra – engineering assistance (1–7, 9–12, 14)
- Joseph Villiard – engineering assistance (4)
- Paul Joasil – engineering assistance (4)
- Richard Evatt – engineering assistance (11)

Artwork and performance

- Christopher Feldmann – art direction, design
- Jonathan Mannion – photography
- Erick Coomes – bass guitar (4)
- Maxime Breton – background vocals, programming (11, 12)

== Charts ==
=== Weekly charts ===
Weekly chart performance for Khaled Khaled
Chart (2021)	Peak position
Australian Albums (ARIA)	7
Austrian Albums (Ö3 Austria)	20
Belgian Albums (Ultratop Flanders)	23
Belgian Albums (Ultratop Wallonia)	59
Canadian Albums (Billboard)	2
Czech Albums (ČNS IFPI)	26
Danish Albums (Hitlisten)	5
Dutch Albums (Album Top 100)	8
Finnish Albums (Suomen virallinen lista)	14
French Albums (SNEP)	38
German Albums (Offizielle Top 100)	46
Irish Albums (OCC)	12
Italian Albums (FIMI)	27
Lithuanian Albums (AGATA)	11
New Zealand Albums (RMNZ)	7
Norwegian Albums (VG-lista)	3
Slovak Albums (ČNS IFPI)	7
Swedish Albums (Sverigetopplistan)	14
Swiss Albums (Schweizer Hitparade)	16
UK Albums (OCC)	10
UK R&B Albums (OCC)	1
US Billboard 200	1
US Top R&B/Hip-Hop Albums (Billboard)	1

=== Year-end charts ===
Year-end chart performance for Khaled Khaled
Chart (2021)	Position
US Billboard 200	83
US Top R&B/Hip-Hop Albums (Billboard)	41

== Certifications ==
Certifications and sales for Khaled Khaled
Region	Certification	Certified units/sales
Brazil (Pro-Música Brasil)	Gold	20,000^{‡}
Canada (Music Canada)	Gold	40,000^{‡}
New Zealand (RMNZ)	Gold	7,500^{‡}
Switzerland (IFPI Switzerland)	Gold	10,000^{‡}
United Kingdom (BPI)	Silver	60,000^{‡}
United States (RIAA)	Platinum	1,000,000^{‡}
^{‡} Sales+streaming figures based on certification alone.
