= Let It Go (DJ Khaled song) =

2021 single by DJ Khaled featuring Justin Bieber and 21 Savage

Single by DJ Khaled featuring Justin Bieber and 21 Savage

from the album Khaled Khaled
- Released: May 10, 2021
- Genre: Pop rap
- Length: 2:45
- Label: We the Best; Epic
- Songwriters: Khaled Khaled; Justin Bieber; Shayaa Abraham-Joseph; Edgar Ferrera
- Producer: DJ Khaled

DJ Khaled singles chronology
"Goin Up" (2021)	"Let It Go" (2021)	"Every Chance I Get" (2021)

Justin Bieber singles chronology
"Peaches" (2021)	"Let It Go" (2021)	"Stay" (2021)

21 Savage singles chronology
"Spiral" (2021)	"Let It Go" (2021)	"My Life" (2021)

Music video
- "Let It Go" on YouTube

"Let It Go" (stylized in all caps) is a song by American record producer DJ Khaled, featuring Canadian singer Justin Bieber and British-American rapper 21 Savage. It was released on May 10, 2021, as the second single from Khaled's twelfth studio album, Khaled Khaled. Khaled, Bieber, and Savage wrote the song with producer SkipOnDaBeat, while the song was also produced by Al Cres. Deemed a "fun" song, it is supported by bouncy production and playful lyrics about not worrying over what cannot be controlled and, instead, "let it go".

== Background ==
According to Justin Bieber's DJ and A&R coordinator, DJ Tay James, the instrumental of "Let It Go" originally came from the team of Jamaican singer-songwriter and record producer Beam, who previously worked with Bieber a couple times earlier in 2021. Beam's team sent Bieber's camp the beat, which previously had a different song with different lyrics. Bieber decided to rewrite and record the song by himself, and later reached out to DJ Khaled. Finally, Khaled got a verse from 21 Savage. On May 2, 2021, both Khaled and Bieber put a behind-the-scenes video of the creation of the song, which does not include Savage.

== Critical reception ==
Exclaim's Josiah Hughes said DJ Khaled's albums are "always good for a great Justin Bieber song", further calling it "another plucky-if-generic pop rap hit". In their album review, Anurag Tagat of Firstpost said "Let It Go" is "pretty much the best example of [radio-friendly, chart-topping music], a sweet production that fits just right for the artists". NME's Luke Morgan Britton called it an "odd brilliantly ludicrous combo". Similarly, Rolling Stone's Jeff Ihaza said it "defies all logic but is somehow the perfect song", citing Bieber's signature "bouncy and ebullient" production, 21's staccato cadence and ad-libs, and the duo's "magical" vocal registers. A.D Amorosi of Variety said the song allows Bieber "to croon elegantly and ruminate spiritually about the 'things I can't control', while the bassy voice of 21 Savage highlights the track's low end, beautifully". Ben Brutocao from HipHopDX called the track a highlight on Khaled Khaled, saying it pairs Bieber and Savage "on a sunny pop banger that flows as though from a glacial spring". Conversely, Pitchfork's Evan Rytlewski deemed the song one of the album's lowlights, stating it recycles the summery vibes of their first collaboration on Khaled's chart-topping 2017 single, "I'm the One", which also features American rappers Quavo, Chance the Rapper, and Lil Wayne.

== Music video ==
The official music video for "Let It Go" premiered on May 10, 2021. It was directed by Colin Tilley. It is set in the theme of a "carefree skit" and pays homage to Adam Sandler's 1996 comedy film Happy Gilmore. The video follows DJ Khaled, Justin Bieber, and 21 Savage taking a different approach to golfing. Bieber portrays Sandler's character from the film, while Khaled, true to his "over-the-top" personality, plays Chubbs Peterson. As Khaled notices Bieber's talent for golf, he ropes him in to defeat their rival 21 Savage, who portrays the character Shooter McGavin. Khaled toasts with his billionaire friends at the We the Best Golf and Club, as his caddy, Bieber, confidently hits a hole-in-one from almost 100 yards away. They continue their antics amid the competition as they drive in their Lamborghini golf carts, until an alligator puts Bieber in danger; Khaled proceeds to wrestle the alligator to protect his newly discovered moneymaker. Khaled then rips off his shirt, and calls Bieber family, before checking the millions in his Chime account. The visual concludes with the trio cruising in their carts to the scoreboard, and enjoying a dance party. The visual was noted for having a large amount of product placements. Bieber also sports a Doug Gilmour jersey in the video.

== Charts ==
Chart performance for "Let It Go"
Chart (2021)	Peak position
Canada Hot 100 (Billboard)	28
Global 200 (Billboard)	49
Ireland (IRMA)	53
New Zealand Hot Singles (RMNZ)	8
Romania (Airplay 100)	77
Sweden Heatseeker (Sverigetopplistan)	16
US Billboard Hot 100	54
US Hot R&B/Hip-Hop Songs (Billboard)	25
US Rolling Stone Top 100	23

== Certifications ==
Certifications for "Let It Go"
Region	Certification	Certified units/sales
United States (RIAA)	Gold	500,000^{‡}
^{‡} Sales+streaming figures based on certification alone.
