= Cold (Kanye West song) =

- Original cover featured a bottle of Theraflu atop the woman's neck and was then edited out for digital releases.

Single by Kanye West and DJ Khaled

from the album Cruel Summer
- Released: April 17, 2012
- Recorded: 2012
- Studio: Jungle City (NYC)
- Genre: Hip-hop
- Length: 3:39
- Label: GOOD Music; Def Jam
- Songwriters: Kanye West; Chauncey Hollis; James Todd Smith; Marlon Williams
- Producer: Hit-Boy

Kanye West singles chronology
"Mercy" (2012)	"Cold" (2012)	"Pride N Joy" (2012)

DJ Khaled singles chronology
"Take It to the Head" (2012)	"Cold" (2012)	"Pride N Joy" (2012)

GOOD Music singles chronology
"Mercy" (2012)	"Cold" (2012)	"New God Flow" (2012)

"Cold" (originally "Theraflu" and then "Way Too Cold"; stylized as "Cold.1" on the album) is a song by American rapper Kanye West and American DJ DJ Khaled, released as the second single from the album Cruel Summer (2012). The song was made available for purchase on the iTunes Store on April 17, 2012. Songwriting is credited to West, Chauncey Hollis, James Todd Smith and Marlon Williams, while production was handled by Hit-Boy. Lyrically, the song features West boasting about his personal issues and touching on subjects such as his relationship with Kim Kardashian, his breakup with Amber Rose, and his feelings on Wiz Khalifa and Kris Humphries. Additional vocals are included from DJ Pharris. The song received positive reviews from music critics, who praised West's lyrical performance and the boldness of his subject matter. The song contains an interpolation of "Lookin' at Me" (1997) as performed by Mase and Puff Daddy, and a sample of "Illegal Search" (1990) also performed by LL Cool J.

The song peaked at number 86 on the US Billboard Hot 100, while it reached number 68 on the Hot R&B/Hip-Hop Songs chart. "Cold" received single artwork designed by frequent West collaborator George Condo, designer of the cover of West's 2010 album My Beautiful Dark Twisted Fantasy. West performed the song at the 2012 Watch the Throne Tour, and at the 2012 BET Awards, along with singles "Mercy" and "New God Flow". A version with an alternative intro was performed live by him during The Yeezus Tour. The song drew controversy from Humphries, the brand Theraflu, and PETA who criticized the content of West's lyrics, claiming the track glorified fur clothing.

== Production and release ==
"Way Too Cold" was produced by Hit-Boy, a producer signed to West's label GOOD Music, known for his production on "Niggas in Paris". According to Hit-Boy, he had "made the beat a couple months ago, just in a session messing around" and that West "just did the record maybe a week and a half ago. We actually don’t know if it's going to be on Khaled's album or ‘Ye's album. We just put it out because we felt like it was so urgent, people just needed to hear it." In an interview Khaled explained: "I was in the studio with 'Ye [Kanye] and I was like, 'Let's do something for your album, and let's do something for my album,' and you can just release it for fun."

The song was first released on the New York City radio station Hot 97 by Funkmaster Flex on April 4, 2012. The cover artwork was designed by George Condo, who designed the artwork for West's album My Beautiful Dark Twisted Fantasy and singles like "Power" and "Runaway". The first cover originally featured a bottle of Theraflu atop the woman's neck, was edited to remove the bottle before being released for digital download. On April 15, West announced on Twitter that the name of the song had been changed to "Way Too Cold", and then finally "Cold". The track was then released as a single onto iTunes on April 17, 2012. Following its digital release, the song impacted urban contemporary radio on May 8, 2012.

== Composition ==
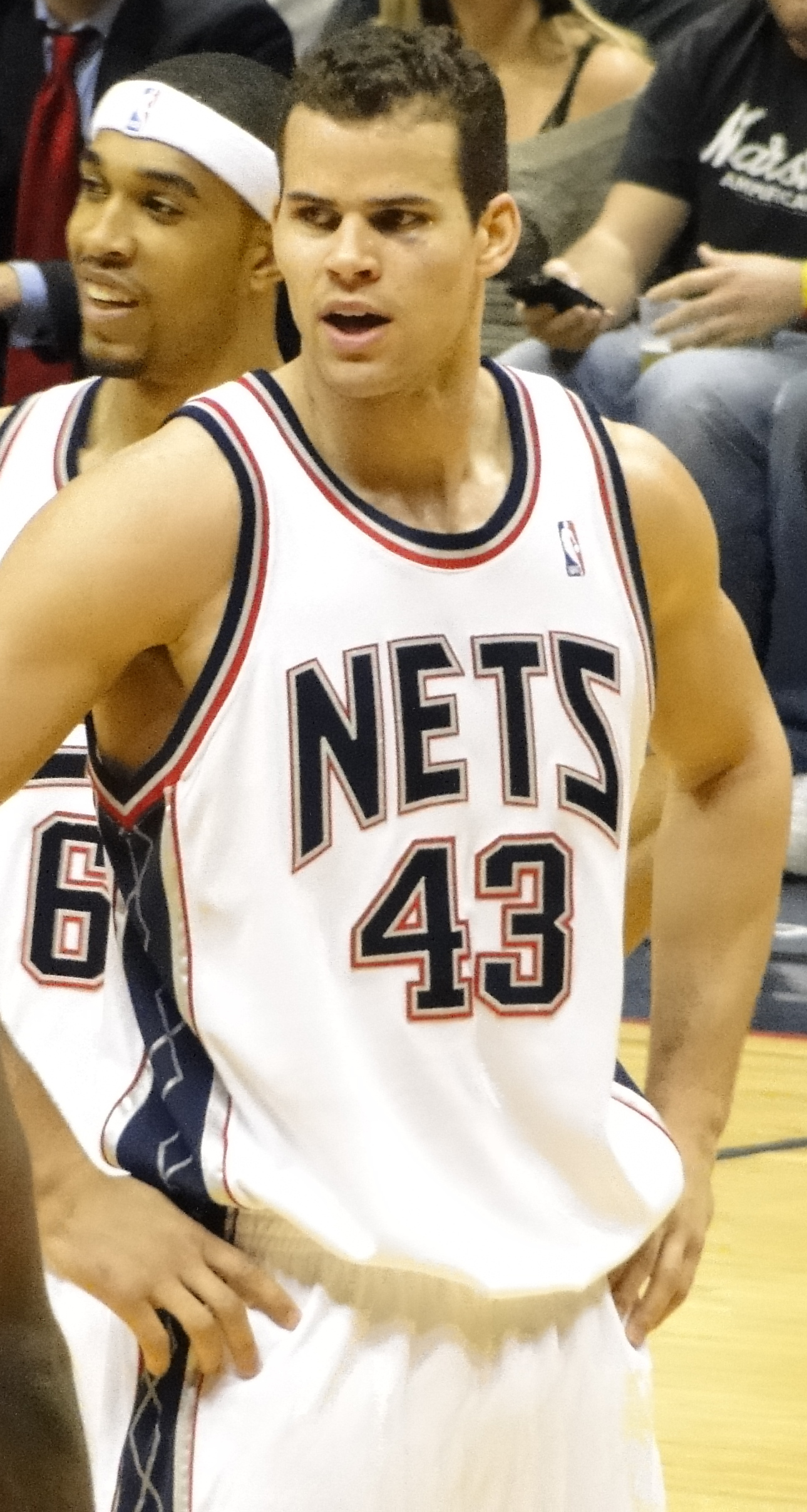
West alludes to his partner's former husband Kris Humphries on the song, linking his NBA team the New Jersey Nets to Jay-Z.

"Cold" is a bass-heavy, bouncy track with West rapping prominently over a "furious beat". It includes West's "blunt thoughts on his romance with model Amber Rose", who was engaged to rapper Wiz Khalifa at the time, with lines like, "only nigga I got respect for is Wiz / And I admit I fell in love with Kim around the same time she fell in love with him". The second part of the quote alludes to his relationship with Kardashian and her estranged husband Kris Humphries. West boasts that Kris is "lucky I ain't had Jay drop him from the team", a line referencing his frequent collaborator Jay-Z, who was part-owner of the New Jersey Nets, the NBA team that basketball star Kris Humphries played for at the time. The song "is stuffed with boasts about the rapper's fashion cred, from boasting that he's had dinner with Vogue editor Anna Wintour to showing off a $6000 pair of shoes. The track features vocal assists from DJ Khaled and DJ Pharris, who close out the outro of the song with their boasting.

== Reception ==
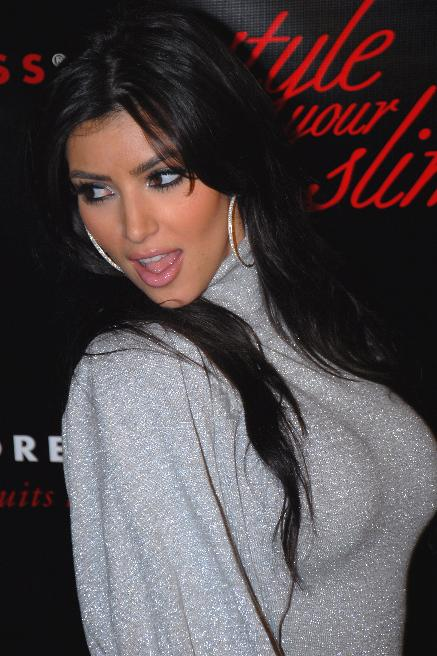
"Cold" features West rapping about his love for television personality and model Kim Kardashian.

The song was met with positive reviews from music critics, who mostly had praise for West's lyrical performance and the boldness of his subject matter. Tom Breihan of Stereogum described the song as "a seriously strong performance, all hard snarls over a bleepy late-'90s-style beat" and that it "finds Kanye getting surprisingly personal, at least for a couple of lines, about his long-rumored relationship with Kim Kardashian." Rob Markman of MTV stated that "lyrically, Kanye delivers a fiery performance" on the track, and that "it's all pretty intriguing, considering Kanye has shied away from the media for almost two years now." Alex Gale of BET mused that the song features a "brash Kanye West going in furiously over a schizophrenic soundscape from Hit-Boy, the production maestro behind The Throne's 'Niggas in Paris.' Yeezy's bars are buzzworthy to say the least". DJBooth mused "arrogance is busting through the seams on the record, yet it is balanced enough to sound charismatic in a form that Mr. West has perfected." Rolling Stone wrote that the song was "surprisingly magnanimous" and that it features West in his "full-on braggart mode".

In Complex's list of the best 25 lines of the first half of 2012, West's line "And I'll admit, I had fell in love with Kim/Around the same time she had fell in love with him/Well that's cool, baby girl, do ya thang/Lucky I ain't had Jay drop him from the team" was listed as the second best. "Cold" debuted at number 92 on the US Billboard Hot 100, ultimately achieving a peak position of number 86 on the chart. The song further reached number 68 on the US Hot R&B/Hip-Hop Songs chart. On September 23, 2020, the song was certified gold by the Recording Industry Association of America (RIAA) for sales of 500,000 certified units in the United States.

=== Controversy ===
When "Cold" premiered, it was titled "Theraflu". A representative of Theraflu released a statement to TMZ which read "We in no way endorse or approve of the references or use of the image and likeness of Theraflu in this manner." Theraflu noted that this was not done at their request. In response to the line "Tell PETA my mink is draggin' on the floor", PETA stated:

"What's draggin' on the floor is Kanye's reputation as a man with no empathy for animals or human beings. He's a great musician but doesn't seem to have the fashion sense to design anything more than caveman costumes. We keep hoping that one day he'll find his heart and join evolved style icons—including Russell Simmons, Pink, and Natalie Portman—who have dropped animal skins."

== Music video ==
The music video was released on August 13, 2012 at the end of DJ Khaled's "I Wish You Would" video. The video features an appearance by West's then-partner Kim Kardashian and was directed by Hype Williams.

== Live performances ==
The song was first performed by West at the London stop of his 2012 Watch the Throne Tour, with West performing the song a cappella. At the 2012 BET Awards, the song was performed with rappers Big Sean, Pusha T, 2 Chainz, as filed out one by one to deliver their verses from the song "Mercy", with West emerging to perform his verses from "Cold" and "New God Flow" afterwards. Though Los Angeles Times's Randall Roberts noted that it wasn't "until West moved into his hit "Cold" that things got great". The track was performed with snow machines shooting out ice over the audience when West played a gig in Hammersmith on February 24, 2013.

On November 20, 2013, when performing live on The Yeezus Tour at the Barclay's Center, West used a vocal track of "Cold as Ice" by Foreigner for an intro to his performance of "Cold". The same version was performed live again by West when he took the tour to Perth Arena on September 6, 2014 and as part of his headline set for Glastonbury Festival 2015.

== Credits and personnel ==
Credits adapted from the liner notes for Cruel Summer (2012).

- Produced by Hit-Boy
- Recorded by Noah Goldstein at Jungle City, NYC
- Mixed by Mike Dean at Jungle City, NYC
- Mix assisted by Keith Parry
- Additional vocals by DJ Pharris

== Chart performance ==
Chart performance for "Cold"
Chart (2012)	Peak position
Canada (Canadian Hot 100)	85
US Billboard Hot 100	86
US Hot R&B/Hip-Hop Songs (Billboard)	69

== Certifications ==
Certifications for "Cold"
Region	Certification	Certified units/sales
United States (RIAA)	Gold	500,000^{‡}
^{‡} Sales+streaming figures based on certification alone.
