= Sorry Not Sorry (DJ Khaled song) =

2021 single

Song by DJ Khaled featuring Nas, Jay-Z, James Fauntleroy, and Harmonies by the Hive

from the album Khaled Khaled
- Released: April 30, 2021
- Genre: R&B; Trapsoul
- Length: 4:18
- Label: We the Best; Epic
- Songwriters: Khaled Khaled; Nasir Jones; Shawn Carter; James Fauntleroy II; Beyoncé Knowles-Carter; Kevin Cossom
- Producers: DJ Khaled; StreetRunner; Tarik Azzouz

Music video
- "Sorry Not Sorry" on YouTube

"Sorry Not Sorry" is a song by American record producer DJ Khaled featuring American rappers Nas and Jay-Z and American singers James Fauntleroy and Beyoncé, the last of whom is credited on the song as "Harmonies by the Hive". Released on April 30, 2021, as the tenth track from Khaled's twelfth studio album Khaled Khaled, the "luxurious" song is an unapologetic ode to their successes.

The official video was released alongside the album and sees Khaled and his crew living a "lush" life at an isolated Las Vegas casino.

== Background ==
To celebrate the collaboration, Jay-Z curated a streaming playlist titled The Genesis that pays homage to Nas. Following the song's release, Nas laughingly said he had to re-write some of his bars after being impressed by Jay's verse, however Khaled said Nas was only joking. The two were previously involved in a well-documented feud, and also collaborated four times before. However, "Sorry Not Sorry" was their first song together in almost a decade, since 2013's "BBC" by Jay-Z. They also performed together at Webster Hall in 2019. Beyoncé appears on the track as "Harmonies by the Hive", a possible allusion to her fanbase, the Beyhive. With the announcement of the song, it was not immediately clear who Harmonies by the Hive was, as Khaled offered little clarity, simply stating to Apple Music: "You know what that is. I haven't seen that done like this ever". It was eventually confirmed to be Beyoncé.

The song marked the third time Jay-Z and Beyoncé collaborated with Khaled, following 2018's "Top Off" with Future, and 2017's "Shining"; Khaled also opened for Beyoncé on her Formation World Tour in 2016. It was also DJ Khaled's second song with Nas and Jay-Z, respectively, behind "Nas Album Done" and "I Got the Keys" from Major Key. Khaled said it had been a lifelong dream to get Jay-Z and Nas on a record of his.

== Composition ==
The song contains mellow piano keys, a languid, luxurious beat of heavy drums and "atmospheric", "symphonic" synths. James Fauntleroy "croons" the chorus, as Nas and Jay-Z trade verses about their "humble beginnings" and successful careers. Nas delivers the first verse about his Coinbase deal, while Jay-Z raps about Japanese whiskey, intermittent fasting, being a billionaire, and his wife. Beyoncé delivers brief backing vocals in between Jay-Z's "tricky" rhymescheme, and vocalizes with Fauntleroy in the outro. Vibe's Datwon Thomas wrote that the track "not only speaks of the material and monetary wealth, but the riches of seeing life with a clearer lens than their days of old".

== Critical reception ==
Aron A. of HotNewHipHop said "'Sorry Not Sorry' remains one of the highlights off of Khaled Khaled with both Nas and Jay-Z delivering incredible verses". The Source's Miss2Bees said "James Fauntleroy and the Harmonies by the Hive weaved the track together with the infectious hook". Earmilk's Margaritë Camaj called the track "astounding", praising it is "nothing short of refreshing and legendary. Listening to every poetic word that Nas and Jay-Z utter is guaranteed to give you chills". Vulture's Halle Kiefer said Beyoncé's "slinky 'heyyyy' [...] absolutely makes Jay-Z's verse", while Rolling Stone's Jon Blistein found that her "etherial" vocals accents the track. The New Yorker's Sheldon Pearce was not as enthusiastic, writing that Jay-Z and Nas "take venture-capitalist raps to new lows on 'Sorry Not Sorry', a celebratory toast that appropriates the language of the sarcastic non-apology for one-percenter consumption. The pair have rarely sounded so bored or so didactic [..]"

== Music video ==
The music video was released along with the album, on April 30, 2021. It was directed by Hype Williams. The visual shows DJ Khaled and his friends, including Nas and Jay-Z, at an empty casino, having a late-night gambling session. They are seen mainly at the blackjack table, enjoying a glamorous evening in Las Vegas and reminisce about their lives before fame. The men are all dressed in tuxedos, smoking cigars. Revolt's Jon Powell noted: "Elsewhere, the collaborators are spotted in front of a wall covered with foliage — a clear indication of the flowers they've continued to receive throughout their illustrious careers".

== Charts ==
Chart performance for "Sorry Not Sorry"
Chart (2021)	Peak position
Global 200 (Billboard)	48
Canada Hot 100 (Billboard)	65
UK Singles (Official Charts)	80
US Billboard Hot 100	30
US Hot R&B/Hip-Hop Songs (Billboard)	13
US Rolling Stone Top 100	24

== Certifications ==
Certifications for "Sorry Not Sorry"
Region	Certification	Certified units/sales
United States (RIAA)	Gold	500,000^{‡}
^{‡} Sales+streaming figures based on certification alone.
