= I Wish You Would (DJ Khaled song) =

Single by DJ Khaled featuring Kanye West and Rick Ross

from the album Kiss the Ring
- Released: June 27, 2012
- Recorded: 2012
- Genre: Hardcore hip-hop
- Length: 3:58
- Label: We the Best; Terror Squad; Young Money; Cash Money; Republic
- Songwriters: Khaled Khaled; Kanye West; William Roberts II; Chauncey Hollis
- Producers: Hit-Boy; DJ Khaled

DJ Khaled singles chronology
"Pride N Joy" (2012)	"I Wish You Would" (2012)	"No New Friends" (2013)

Kanye West singles chronology
"Pride N Joy" (2012)	"I Wish You Would" (2012)	"New God Flow" (2012)

Rick Ross singles chronology
"Pop That" (2012)	"I Wish You Would" (2012)	"Triumphant (Get 'Em)" (2012)

"I Wish You Would" is a hip-hop song by American disc jockey DJ Khaled, released by We the Best Music Group, Young Money Entertainment, Cash Money Records and Republic Records on June 27, 2012 as the second single from his sixth album, Kiss the Ring (2012). It features guest performances from Kanye West and Rick Ross, while production was handled by Hit-Boy. The song premiered on Hot 97 with Funkmaster Flex.

== Music video ==
On July 16, 2012, DJ Khaled published images from the sets of the video, via his Twitter account. Cash Money Records labelmates Mack Maine, Ace Hood, and Birdman make cameos. The video was directed by Hype Williams, who already worked on the music video for "Go Hard", with Khaled and West. The video was recorded in the same place of West's single, "Cold". On August 6, 2012, the behind-the-scenes video was released showing footage from the sets of it, featuring the guest artists. The video premiered on BET's 106 & Park on August 13, 2012, along with the music video for West's single "Cold".

== Track listing ==
Digital single

No.	Title	Writer(s)	Producer(s)	Length
1.	"I Wish You Would" (featuring Kanye West, Rick Ross, and Hype Williams)	Khaled Khaled; Kanye West; William Roberts II; Chauncey Hollis	Hit-Boy	3:58

== Charts ==
Chart (2012)	Peak Position
US Billboard Hot 100	78
US Hot R&B/Hip-Hop Songs (Billboard)	37
US Billboard Rap Songs	19

== Certifications ==
Region	Certification	Certified units/sales
United States (RIAA)	Gold	500,000^{‡}
^{‡} Sales+streaming figures based on certification alone.

== Release history ==
List of release dates, record label and format details
Country	Date	Format	Label	Ref
United States	June 27, 2012	Digital download	We the Best; Terror Squad; Young Money; Cash Money; Republic	
