= Kiss the Ring =

Studio album by DJ Khaled
- Released: August 21, 2012
- Recorded: 2011–2012
- Genre: Hip-hop
- Length: 48:26
- Labels: We the Best; YMCMB; Cash Money; Universal Republic
- Producers: DJ Khaled (also exec.); Boi-1da; Canei Finch; DASECA Productions; Detail; DJ Premier; DJ Toomp; Hit-Boy; J. Cole; Jahlil Beats; J.U.S.T.I.C.E. League; K.E. on the Track; Marz; Mike WiLL Made It; Sonny Digital; The Beat Bully; The Monarch; The Olympicks; The Runners

DJ Khaled chronology
We the Best Forever (2011)	Kiss the Ring (2012)	Suffering from Success (2013)

Singles from Kiss the Ring
- 1. "Take It to the Head" Released: March 27, 2012; 2. "I Wish You Would" Released: June 27, 2012

Kiss the Ring is the sixth studio album by American disc jockey and record producer DJ Khaled. It was released on August 21, 2012, by We the Best Music Group, Young Money Cash Money Billionaires (YMCMB), Cash Money Records and Universal Republic Records. The album was supported by the singles "Take It to the Head" and "I Wish You Would", both of which charted on the Billboard Hot 100 at numbers 58 and 78, respectively. The album features guest appearances from Meek Mill, Ace Hood, Plies, Lil Wayne, T.I., Future, Kanye West, Rick Ross, Chris Brown, Nicki Minaj, J. Cole, Big K.R.I.T., Kendrick Lamar, Big Sean, Wiz Khalifa, T-Pain, Scarface, Nas, French Montana, Jadakiss, Birdman, 2 Chainz, Wale, Tyga, Kirko Bangz, Mavado, and Mack Maine.

== Background ==
On December 10, 2011, DJ Khaled announced the title of his next album, Kiss the Ring, via video, with the release date as "coming soon", presumed 2012. The album cover and release date were released in a video promoting the album on May 24, 2012. Guests on the album are Ace Hood, Lil Wayne, T-Pain, Kendrick Lamar, Rick Ross, Chris Brown, Kanye West, Wale, Nas, among others. The production team consists of Jahlil Beats, Mike WiLL Made It, Hit-Boy, The Runners, J. Cole, K.E. on the Track, J.U.S.T.I.C.E. League, DJ Premier, The Beat Bully, Detail, Boi-1da, DJ Toomp, Sonny Digital, DASECA Productions and The Olympicks.

== Singles ==
The album's first single "Take It to the Head, released on March 27, 2012, featured Chris Brown, Rick Ross, Nicki Minaj and Lil Wayne. On May 20, 2012, the music video for "Take It to the Head" featuring Chris Brown, Rick Ross, Nicki Minaj and Lil Wayne premiered on MTV Jams. On June 27, 2012, the album's second single "I Wish You Would" featuring Kanye West and Rick Ross was released. It is produced by Hit-Boy. The music video for "I Wish You Would" premiered on BET's 106 & Park on August 13, 2012, along with the music video for West's single "Cold".

The song "Bitches & Bottles (Let's Get It Started)" featuring Future, T.I. and Lil Wayne was released as a promotional single and debuted at number nine on the Bubbling Under Hot 100 Singles chart. "They Ready" featuring J. Cole, Big K.R.I.T. & Kendrick Lamar, "I Did It For My Dawgz" featuring Meek Mill, Rick Ross, French Montana & Jadakiss, and "Hip Hop" featuring Scarface, Nas & DJ Premier were also released as promotional singles prior to the album's release. On August 17, 2012, the music video was released for "Don't Get Me Started" featuring Ace Hood. On August 20, 2012, the music video was released for "Suicidal Thoughts/Aktion Pack" featuring Mavado. On December 2, 2012, the music video for "Bitches & Bottles (Let's Get It Started)" featuring Future, T.I., Lil Wayne, and Ace Hood premiered on MTV Jams. On December 5, 2012, the music video was released for "I Did It for My Dawgs" featuring Rick Ross, Jadakiss, Meek Mill, Ace Hood and French Montana.

== Critical reception ==
Professional ratings
Review scores
Source	Rating
AllMusic	3/5 stars
Consequence of Sound	2/5 stars
Entertainment Weekly	7.5/10
Exclaim!	7/10
HipHopDX	2.5/5 stars
XXL	4/5 stars

Kiss the Ring received generally positive reviews from contemporary music critics. At Metacritic, which assigns a normalized rating out of 100 to reviews from mainstream critics, the album received an average score of 62, which indicates "generally favorable reviews", based on seven reviews. In a mixed review, Edwin Ortiz of the HipHopDX, claimed the album "is a series of single tracks that hit or miss, and one can only imagine what DJ Khaled's batting average is at now". In the highest-score review, XXL editor Adam Fleischer, said the Kiss the Ring "is brief and overrun with enough proven formulas and artists that the opportunity for a miss barely exists". Mark Bozzer from Canadian music magazine Exclaim! reviewed the album saying "Khaled goes through his hip-hop Rolodex yet again and compiles a strong collection of MCs and producers to add some shine to his latest musical collage". AllMusic editor David Jeffries characterized as "a run-of-the-mill Khaled album and that mill is still doing pretty awesome". In the review which the album had the lowest score, Consequence of Sound editor Mike Madden said: "unfortunately, Kiss the Ring often sounds like it was made just to vault the celebrity-status and net worth of the man on its cover."

== Commercial performance ==
The album debuted at number four on the US Billboard 200, selling 41,000 copies in its first week. It also peaked at number three on Top R&B/Hip-Hop Albums. As of September 11, 2012, it had sold 63,000 copies in the US. Then by September 2013, the album had sold 108,000 copies in the United States.

== Track listing ==
No.	Title	Writer(s)	Producer(s)	Length
1.	"Shout Out to the Real" (featuring Meek Mill, Ace Hood and Plies)	Khaled Khaled; Robert Williams; Antoine McColister; Algernod Washington; Jahlil Tucker; Raymond Angry	Jahlil Beats; DJ Khaled	4:13
2.	"Bitches & Bottles (Let's Get It Started)" (featuring T.I., Lil Wayne and Future)	Khaled; Dwayne Carter; Clifford Harris; Nayvadius Wilburn; Michael Williams; Marquel Middlebrooks	Mike WiLL Made It; Marz of EarDrummers*	4:29
3.	"I Wish You Would" (featuring Kanye West and Rick Ross)	Khaled; Kanye West; William Roberts II; Chauncey Hollis	Hit-Boy	3:57
4.	"Take It to the Head" (featuring Rick Ross, Chris Brown, Nicki Minaj and Lil Wayne)	Khaled; Kevin Cossom; Chris Brown; Roberts II; Onika Maraj; Carter; Andrew Harr, Jermaine Jackson; Andre Davidson, Sean Davidson	The Runners; DJ Khaled*	4:27
5.	"They Ready" (featuring J. Cole, Big K.R.I.T. and Kendrick Lamar)	Khaled; Jermaine Cole; Justin Scott; Kendrick Duckworth; Canei Finch; Willie Hutchinson	J. Cole; Canei Finch*	3:14
6.	"I'm So Blessed" (featuring Big Sean, Wiz Khalifa, Ace Hood and T-Pain)	Khaled; Sean Anderson; Cameron Thomaz; McColister; Faheem Najm; Kevin Erondu	K.E. on the Track; DJ Khaled*	4:12
7.	"Hip Hop" (featuring Scarface, Nas and DJ Premier)	Khaled; Brad Jordan; Nasir Jones; Kevin Crowe, Erik Ortiz; Peter Watts; Rick Rubin; James Todd Smith; Darryl McDaniels; Joseph Simmons	J.U.S.T.I.C.E. League	4:23
8.	"I Did It for My Dawgz" (featuring Rick Ross, Meek Mill, French Montana and Jadakiss)	Khaled; Roberts II; Karim Kharbouch; Jason Phillips; Williams; Anthony Tucker	The Beat Bully	4:25
9.	"I Don't See 'Em" (featuring Birdman, Ace Hood and 2 Chainz)	Khaled; Bryan Williams; McColister; Tauheed Epps; Noel Fisher	Detail	4:34
10.	"Don't Pay 4 It" (featuring Wale, Tyga, Mack Maine and Kirko Bangz)	Khaled; Kirk Randle; Michael Stevenson; Jermaine Preyan; Olubowale Akinthimehin; Harr; Jackson	The Runners	4:17
11.	"Suicidal Thoughts" (featuring Mavado)	Khaled; David Brooks; Matthew Samuels	Boi-1da	3:14
12.	"Outro (They Don't Want War)" (featuring Ace Hood)	Khaled; McColister; Aldrin Davis; Jonathan English	DJ Toomp	3:03
Total length:				48:32

Deluxe edition bonus tracks
No.	Title	Writer(s)	Producer(s)	Length
13.	"Don't Get Me Started" (featuring Ace Hood)	McColister; Sonny Uwaezuoke; R. Brooks	Sonny Digital	3:02
14.	"Aktion Pak" (featuring Mavado)	David Brooks; David Harrisingh; Craig Harrisingh	DASECA Productions	3:07
15.	"B-Boyz" (performed by Birdman and Mack Maine featuring Kendrick Lamar, Ace Hood and DJ Khaled)	Bryan Williams; Duckworth; McColister; Preyan; Brian Parker; Bob Wicker; David Stokes; Jayson James; Kyle Miller	The Olympicks	4:57
Total length:				59:39

iTunes bonus track
No.	Title	Writer(s)	Producer(s)	Length
16.	"Piss 'Em Off" (featuring Ace Hood)	McColister; Andre Davidson; Sean Davidson	The Monarch	2:49

(*) Denotes co-producer

== Charts ==
=== Weekly charts ===
Chart (2012)	Peak position
Canadian Albums (Billboard)	17
US Billboard 200	4
US Digital Albums (Billboard)	3
US Top R&B/Hip-Hop Albums (Billboard)	3
US Indie Store Album Sales (Billboard)	5

=== Year-end charts ===
Chart (2012)	Position
US Top R&B/Hip-Hop Albums (Billboard)	65
