= Red Nose Day 2015 =

Fund-raising event

- Also known as: Red Nose Day 2015: Face the Funny
- Genre: Telethon
- Presented by: Lenny Henry; Davina McCall; David Walliams; John Bishop; Claudia Winkleman; Sarah Millican; Russell Brand; Jo Brand; Greg James
- Narrated by: Mark Goodier
- Theme music composer: Ben Chapman
- Opening theme: "Whole Lotta Love (Remix)"
- Ending theme: "Dec Says"
- Country of origin: United Kingdom
- Original language: English

Production
- Executive producer: Richard Curtis
- Production location: London Palladium
- Camera setup: Multiple
- Running time: 7 hours (420 minutes)

Original release
- Network: BBC One, BBC Two
- Release: 13 March – 14 March 2015

Related
- Red Nose Day 2013; Red Nose Day 2017; The Great British Bake Off; Let's Play Darts for Comic Relief; The People's Strictly for Comic Relief

Red Nose Day 2015 was a fund-raising event organised by Comic Relief. It was broadcast live on BBC One and BBC Two from the evening of Friday 13 March 2015 into the early hours of Saturday 14 March 2015. It was part of the "Face the Funny" campaign.

Following the closure of BBC Television Centre in 2013, Comic Relief had to look for new locations to hold the annual telethons. They were previously filmed live from Studio One. Sport Relief 2014 was the first telethon not filmed at Television Centre but at the Copper Box in London's Olympic Park. As a result, Red Nose Day 2015 was broadcast live, for the first time in its history, from the London Palladium in central London.

== Results ==
The 2015 Red Nose Day telethon and surrounding efforts raised a total of £99.4 million pounds. After the 2022 event, the overall total stands at £1,047,000,000 raised over 30 years.

== Before main event ==
=== Documentaries ===
==== Operation Health ====
A team of celebrities supporting local residents transform a run-down clinic in eastern Uganda into a fully functioning healthcare facility. The documentary tells the story of Comic Relief's brand-new, ambitious and life-changing project Operation Health. Celebrities who took part included: Lenny Henry, Richard Hammond, Doon Mackichan, Anita Rani, John Bishop, Steve Backshall, and Dermot O'Leary.

=== Television and Radio ===
==== The Great Comic Relief Bake Off ====
The Bake Off returned for a four-part series on Wednesday 11 February at 8pm on BBC One. Mary Berry and Paul Hollywood returned as judges whilst Mel Giedroyc, Sue Perkins, Jo Brand and Ed Byrne each hosted one of the four episodes.

The episode line up was as follows:

Star Baker

Episode No.	Guest host	Signature Challenge	Technical Challenge	Showstopper Challenge	Contestants	Airdate	Viewers (millions)
1	Sue Perkins	Giant Cookie or Biscuit	12 Mini Fruit Tarts	Tiered Chocolate Cake	Dame Edna Everage	11 February 2015	7.75
1	Sue Perkins	Giant Cookie or Biscuit	12 Mini Fruit Tarts	Tiered Chocolate Cake	Joanna Lumley	11 February 2015	7.75
1	Sue Perkins	Giant Cookie or Biscuit	12 Mini Fruit Tarts	Tiered Chocolate Cake	Jennifer Saunders	11 February 2015	7.75
1	Sue Perkins	Giant Cookie or Biscuit	12 Mini Fruit Tarts	Tiered Chocolate Cake	Lulu	11 February 2015	7.75
2	Mel Giedroyc	24 cupcakes	20 profiteroles	Marble "Building" Cake	Jonathan Ross	18 February 2015	8.39
2	Mel Giedroyc	24 cupcakes	20 profiteroles	Marble "Building" Cake	Zoe Sugg	18 February 2015	8.39
2	Mel Giedroyc	24 cupcakes	20 profiteroles	Marble "Building" Cake	Gok Wan	18 February 2015	8.39
2	Mel Giedroyc	24 cupcakes	20 profiteroles	Marble "Building" Cake	Abbey Clancy	18 February 2015	8.39
3	Jo Brand	24 Shortbread	6 Mini Pork Pies	Triple-tiered Pavlova	Sarah Brown	25 February 2015	
3	Jo Brand	24 Shortbread	6 Mini Pork Pies	Triple-tiered Pavlova	David Mitchell	25 February 2015	
3	Jo Brand	24 Shortbread	6 Mini Pork Pies	Triple-tiered Pavlova	Michael Sheen	25 February 2015	
3	Jo Brand	24 Shortbread	6 Mini Pork Pies	Triple-tiered Pavlova	Jameela Jamil	25 February 2015	
4	Ed Byrne	Tray Bake	12 Crumpets	Vegetable Self Portrait Cake	Alexa Chung	4 March 2015	
4	Ed Byrne	Tray Bake	12 Crumpets	Vegetable Self Portrait Cake	Victoria Wood	4 March 2015	
4	Ed Byrne	Tray Bake	12 Crumpets	Vegetable Self Portrait Cake	Chris Moyles	4 March 2015	
4	Ed Byrne	Tray Bake	12 Crumpets	Vegetable Self Portrait Cake	Kayvan Novak	4 March 2015	

Jo Brand hosted a special edition of The Great British Bake Off: An Extra Slice on Friday 13 March at 10pm on BBC Two in which the four star bakers competed for the title of Ultimate Star Baker. Mary Berry crowned Victoria Wood as the winner.

==== Let's Play Darts for Comic Relief ====
Starting on Sunday 1 March 2015, Gabby Logan hosted a week-long darts competition that aired on BBC Two, in which a group of celebrities teamed up with professional darts players and went head-to-head in a winner-take-all tournament. There were four quarter finals. After five rounds of darts the winner was announced. Then the semi-finals were held, followed by the two winning duos facing off in the final round.

The celebrity and professional partnerships were as follows:

Celebrity	Known for	Professional partner
Bob Mortimer	Vic and Bob	Andy Fordham
Lee Mack	Not Going Out comedian & actor	Martin Adams
Liza Tarbuck	Actress, TV & radio presenter	Bobby George
Martin Offiah	former professional rugby league footballer	Anastasia Dobromyslova
Richard Osman	Pointless presenter	Deta Hedman
Roisin Conaty	Comedian	Richie George
Sean Lock	Comedian	Ted Hankey
Tim Vine	Not Going Out comedian	Darryl Fitton

==== The People's Strictly ====
Starting on Wednesday 25 February 2015, Tess Daly and Claudia Winkleman hosted the first ever Strictly Come Dancing open to members of the public. Airing on Wednesday nights at 9pm, the first two episodes showed the six nominated members of the public finding out they had won a place on the show, followed by their training in ballroom dancing. On Wednesday 11 March at 9pm, all six couples performed live, with the winner then being crowned on Red Nose Day Night, Friday 13 March 2015. The judging panel consists of Len Goodman, Bruno Tonioli, Darcey Bussell and Anton Du Beke. It was announced on Red Nose Day Night that Cassidy Little and Natalie Lowe had won the first 'The People's Strictly'.

==== The Graham Norton Show ====
On Friday 6 March at 10:35pm on BBC One, Graham Norton hosted a special Comic Relief edition of The Graham Norton Show to celebrate 30 years of Comic Relief. His guests were past and present contributors to Comic Relief: Jennifer Saunders, David Walliams, Cheryl Cole, Jack Dee and Johnny Vegas. During the programme an exclusive clip of the Little Britain Skit with Stephen Hawking was shown, as well as an appeal film in which David Walliams was reunited with a boy called Phillip, whom he met whilst filming an appeal film for Sport Relief 2012.

=== Other events and popular culture ===
==== Danceathon ====
The first Comic Relief Danceathon was held on Sunday 8 March, lasting six hours. A host of stars took part including Caroline Flack, Davina McCall, Rufus Hound and host Claudia Winkleman at The SSE Arena, Wembley.

==== Dermot's Day of Dance ====
Dermot O'Leary danced non-stop for 24 hours to raise money for Red Nose Day 2015. He began at 19:20 on 12 March 2015, live during The One Show and finished at 19:20 on Red Nose Day, 13 March 2015. Dermot danced outside The One Show Studio at broadcasting house in a designated area with a dance floor, screens and DJ mixers. During the night he also moved inside to the One Show Studio, where a temporary dance floor had been created.

During the challenge O'Leary was allowed breaks only to go the toilet and to shower. During his challenge other entertainment personalities appeared to dance, support, perform and do a DJ set; these stars included: Ben Shephard, Lenny Henry, Alex Jones, Matt Baker, Rufus Hound, Davina McCall, Claudia Winkleman, Jo Whiley, Edith Bowman, Nick Grimshaw, Ronan Keating, Tony Blackburn, Lauren Laverne, Holly Willoughby, Jamie Oliver, Little Mix, Kirstie Allsopp, Carol Kirkwood, Clean Bandit, Michael Ball, Caroline Flack, Laura Whitmore, Ashley Roberts, Blue, Zoë Ball, Sophie Ellis-Bextor, Keith Lemon, Joey Essex, Fearne Cotton, Rastamouse, Twiggy, Bucks Fizz, Terry Wogan and Chris Evans. During the 24-hour dance-off, Dermot raised a total of £643,336.

==== Mark Watson's Comedy Marathon ====
From Friday 27 February until Saturday 28 February 2015, Mark Watson attempted to do stand-up comedy for 27 hours to raise money for Comic Relief. He completed his challenge late in the evening of 28 February 2015.

==== David Walliams book ====
David Walliams wrote a Children's Short Story for Comic Relief 2015 called The Queen's Orang-Utan selling at £4.99. All profits went to Comic Relief, as did all future sales of the book.

==== Phoenix Nights Live ====
Phoenix Nights returned for the first time in fifteen years with a set of live shows in aid of Comic Relief. Reuniting the full original cast, the show ran for fifteen nights at Manchester Arena.

The multi-award-winning and critically acclaimed series followed the rise and fall of scheming club impresario Brian Potter and his band of loyal staff and regulars who will do just about anything to make his beloved Phoenix club a success. Peter Kay said "Comic Relief has always been close to my heart and I always try to think of something. I could think of no better way to raise money and have fun than getting everybody back together."

The show began its run on Saturday 31 January and finished on Monday 16 February.

Paddy McGuinness stated on The Jonathan Ross Show on 20 February that the total raised by the show was approximately £5 million. This total was later confirmed on Red Nose Day Night as being £5,031,146.47.

=== British industry ===
==== Rimmel London ====
Supermodel Kate Moss created a new lipstick for Comic Relief 2015 and showed it off in a spoof advert featuring David Walliams dressed as various supermodels.

==== Sainsbury's ====
Sainsbury's sold Red Nose Day 2015 official merchandise in all of their stores across the UK, as they had for the previous 15 years. this raised a total of £11,521,278.

==== TK Maxx ====
It was revealed on Red Nose Day Night that the employees and customers of TK Maxx raised a total of £4,064,106.

==== Maltesers ====
The employees and customers of Maltesers raised a total of £1,334,842.

== Main event ==
Orlando Bloom made a special appearance during the main show, kissing both Davina McCall and David Walliams. Barbara Windsor appeared later in the show, kissing Walliams in the Royal Box. Made in Chelsea's Jamie Lang also appeared on the show.

During the main event, the UK Government announced that they would match the money raised by UK schools up to £10 million.

Walliams successfully attempted to break the world record for 'Most Kisses Received in 30 Seconds' and beat the minimum number of kisses required to earn the world record by 5, receiving 55 kisses.

=== Presenters ===
Time	Presenters
19:00-20:05	Lenny Henry and Davina McCall
20:05-21:15	David Walliams and Davina McCall
21:15-22:00	John Bishop and Davina McCall
22:00-22:40	Jo Brand
22:40-00:00	Sarah Millican and Claudia Winkleman
00:00-01:15	Russell Brand and Claudia Winkleman
01:15-02:15	Greg James

=== Appeal films ===
It was announced on 3 March 2015 that Olivia Colman, Idris Elba, Peter Capaldi, John Bishop, Dermot O'Leary and Lenny Henry would front the appeal films for the 2015 telethon.

Whilst filming his appeal films in Kenya, Dermot O'Leary was sleeping rough with three boys when a car swerved off the road, resulting in a near-accident for the group.

Film name	Issue Covered	Description	Presenter
David Reunites with Phillip	Need for Education	David Walliams reunites with a young man called Phillip whom he met in Kenya whilst filming a video appeal for Sport Relief 2012	David Walliams
Young Carers in the UK	Young Carers	Olivia Colman meets a young girl struggling to care for her mother	Olivia Colman
24 Hours in Kenya	Children on the Streets	Dermot O'Leary spends 24 hours sleeping rough and following three boys in Kenya	Dermot O'Leary
Refugees	Refugees	A group of refugees in Africa tell their story	Peter Capaldi
Has Comic Relief made progress in 30 Years?	Transparency of Donations	Lenny Henry shows how your money has made a difference over the last 30 years	Lenny Henry
Ebony meets Violet	Children Struggles in Africa	For the first time, a young British fundraiser travels to Africa and meets a young girl Ebony and hears her story	Ebony
Florie & Angela	Dementia	Florie talks about her relationship with daughter Angela and explains how her husband isn't around but she is sure that he's fine. Angela then reveals that Florie's husband died of cancer and she forgets that he has died, meaning she must constantly explain what happened.	None
Infant Mortality by Malaria	Malaria	John Bishop meets a father who lost his two eldest children to malaria and had to bury them in his garden	John Bishop
Ebola	Ebola	Three volunteers who have fought Ebola explain the horrors of it	Idris Elba
Rwanda Genocide	Re-visit those affected by the genocide	A woman called Esther is revisited to see how she has dealt with the devastating effect of the Rwandan genocide and how she's been helped by Comic Relief	Paul Bradley
When I Grow Up...	Need for Education	Children want education but instead some are forced to work on a huge rubbish dump	John Bishop
Children's Hospital	Need more Hospitals	Peter Capaldi visits a hospital and sees the need for more space and the heartbreaking story of one little boy who passes away	Peter Capaldi
Solving Malaria	Malaria	David Tennant explains how Comic Relief has helped those affected by malaria	David Tennant
The Ward	Malaria	The struggles of a children's ward to deal with malaria	Peter Capaldi
Money in the UK	Comic Relief in the UK	How is your money spent in the UK?	Davina McCall
Time	Importance of Time	Peter Capaldi talks about how time is one of the biggest challenges	Peter Capaldi
One Time Syringe	Stopping Syringe Problems	John Bishop shows a syringe which can only be used once and then solves problems	John Bishop
Football	Sport for Kids	Trevor Noah looks at how activity clubs can help kids in Cape Town	Trevor Noah
Mental Health in the UK	Mental Health	One young girl tells her story and how she and her mother both have struggled with mental health issues	None

=== Sketches and features ===
Title	Brief description	Starring
Mr. Bean	Mr. Bean returns to Comic Relief and causes havoc at a funeral	Rowan Atkinson, Ben Miller and Rebecca Front
David Walliams kisses record attempt	David Walliams broke the new world record of number of kisses in 30 seconds. He was kissed 55 times. This challenge also saw him practice kissing with Orlando Bloom and Barbara Windsor	David Walliams, Orlando Bloom and Barbara Windsor
Dermot's Day of Dance	Dermot completes his 24-hour dance marathon by dancing down Regent Street and into the Palladium. He raised a total of £643,336.	Dermot O'Leary
The People's Strictly	Tess Daly and Claudia Winkleman announce the winners of the first People's Strictly	Tess Daly and Claudia Winkleman
The Vicar of Dibley	Geraldine Kennedy (née Granger) returns and is interviewed to be the first woman to become a bishop	Dawn French, Trevor Peacock and James Fleet, Emma Watson, Jennifer Saunders, Ruth Jones, Annette Crosbie, Maureen Lipman, Fiona Bruce and Richard Ayoade
Peter Kay's Phoenix Nights Live	Highlights of Peter Kay's recent arena tour of his hit Channel 4 sitcom Phoenix Nights	Peter Kay, Dave Spikey, Neil Fitzmaurice, Paddy McGuinness, Steve Edge, Toby Foster, Archie Kelly, Janice Connolly, Bea Kelley, and Justin Moorhouse
Mr Khan	Mr Khan from Citizen Khan appears live in the audience and speaks to Davina	Adil Ray
Little Britain	David Walliams stars as Wheelchair Carer Lou as he looks after a new patient—Professor Stephen Hawking	David Walliams, Catherine Tate and Stephen Hawking
The Four Yorkshire Men Spoof	In a re-imagining of Monty Python's Classic The Four Yorkshire Men Sketch, four Comic and Sport Relief heroes gather to compare their extreme challenges in a special live sketch	Eddie Izzard, David Walliams, John Bishop and Davina McCall
The Great British Bake Off: An Extra Slice	The four celebrity star bakers compete to be crowned Ultimate Comic Relief Baker	Jo Brand, Mary Berry, Frank Skinner, Michael Sheen, Jennifer Saunders, Gok Wan and Victoria Wood
Who's Got What it takes to be a National Treasure	Stephen Fry, Miranda Hart and Sheridan Smith sit on the judging panel as they decide the National Treasure of 2015. Shown in 2 parts	Stephen Fry, Sheridan Smith, Miranda Hart, David Gandy, Cheryl Cole, Chuckle Brothers, David Walliams, Liam Gallagher, Ronnie Corbett, Robbie Williams, Katie Price, Keith Harris, Thierry Henry, Dean Gaffney, Vanessa Feltz and Russell Brand
007: Behind the Bond	In a special mockumentary, we go behind the scenes of the James Bond film franchise and find out who is the voice of James Bond	Daniel Craig, Roger Moore, Rory Kinnear, Alan Carr, Sam Mendes, Naomie Harris and Ben Whishaw
Live Stand Up	Live stand-up sets from some of Britain's best comedians were seen throughout the night	Lenny Henry, John Bishop, Sarah Millican, Trevor Noah and Doc Brown
Cardinal Burns	Cardinal Burns perform comedy sketches Live!	Sebastian Cardinal and Dustin Demri-Burns
No Direction	Five comedians form a tribute band for the world's biggest boyband One Direction and give a live performance of their biggest hits, singing and dancing live.	Patrick Kielty, Nick Helm, Johnny Vegas, Vic Reeves and Jack Dee
Catherine Tate	A reshowing of the Classic 2007 Sketch, where Elaine Figgis dates Daniel Craig	Catherine Tate and Daniel Craig
Toast of London	Claudia takes issue with the voiceover man, Steven Toast, for announcing her name wrong. As a result, he becomes very angry with her.	Matt Berry and Claudia Winkleman

=== Musical Performances ===
Artist	Song	Notes
Ella Henderson	"Yours"	
Sam Smith featuring John Legend	"Lay Me Down"	Official Comic Relief Single
Labrinth	"Jealous"	

=== Cast ===
- Adil Ray
- Barbara Windsor
- Ben Miller
- Ben Whishaw
- Catherine Tate
- Cheryl Fernandez-Versini
- Chuckle Brothers
- Claudia Winkleman
- Daniel Craig
- David Gandy
- David Walliams
- Davina McCall
- Dawn French
- Dermot O'Leary
- Doc Brown
- Dustin Demri-Burns
- Eddie Izzard
- Ella Henderson
- Emma Watson
- Fiona Bruce
- Frank Skinner
- Gok Wan
- Greg James
- Idris Elba
- Jack Dee
- James Fleet
- Jennifer Saunders
- John Bishop
- John Legend
- Johnny Vegas
- Jo Brand
- Katie Price
- Keith Harris
- Labrinth
- Lenny Henry
- Liam Gallagher
- Mark Watson
- Mary Berry
- Matt Berry
- Maureen Lipman
- Michael Sheen
- Miranda Hart
- Nick Helm
- Olivia Colman
- Orlando Bloom
- Paddy McGuinness
- Patrick Kielty
- Peter Kay
- Rebecca Front
- Robbie Williams
- Ronnie Corbett
- Rowan Atkinson
- Russell Brand
- Ruth Jones
- Sam Smith
- Sarah Millican
- Sebastian Cardinal
- Sheridan Smith
- Stephen Hawking
- Stephen Fry
- Tess Daly
- Trevor Noah
- Trevor Peacock
- Vic Reeves
- Victoria Wood

== Donation progress ==
Time	Amount	Notes
20:38	£7,041,802 One Year	
21:42	£46,017,034 Two Years	
23:57	£70,501,108 Lot of time	
00:59	£78,082,988	Highest Total ever raised on the night
01:00	£1,047,083,706	Overall total over 30 years
