= Lex and Davey =

English radio show hosts

- Born: Alexander Gough; David Stewart; Lex: 2 July 1988 (age 38); Davey: 28 May 1985 (age 41); Liverpool, England
- Occupations: TV & Radio Presenters
- Presenting career
- Show: British Indoor Karting Championship
- Country: United Kingdom
- Previous shows: Juice FM; Chorley FM; Wirral Radio; KCR FM; Fraggle Radio
- Website: lexanddavey.com

Lex Gough (Lex Carter) and Dave Stewart (Davey Carter), known professionally as Lex and Davey (stylised as 'Lex&Davey'), are radio show presenters and are best known for hosting the breakfast show on Chorley FM (in Lancashire, England) between April 2014 and March 2016. On October 19, 2015, they got to the final of the 'Your Big Chance' competition with Radio City (Liverpool), Rock FM and Key 103. In November 2015, they joined Wirral Radio for a short run before leaving due to other commitments in May 2016. Between 2016 - 2018 Lex and Davey had a DJ residency at The Krazyhouse nightclub in Liverpool before its closure in July 2018. As of 2021, Lex and Davey present the British Indoor Karting Championship for TeamSport Karting.

== Radio career ==
=== FraggleRADIO ===
The two first worked together at a radio station that Davey founded in 2005 called 'FraggleRADIO', which was an Internet radio station in Liverpool based inside the Quiggins shopping center. After presenting The Big Live Drive on KCC Live for a year, Lex was invited to join FraggleRADIO by Davey shortly after they met during a band night in Liverpool. Eventually the two decided to present a show together called Unleashed. In July 2006, Quiggins was forced to close down, which also resulted in the closure of the radio station.

=== The Net 40 ===
In 2008, they were approached by The Net 40 to present the show on a regular basis. They presented the show for several months before leaving to present a show on KCR FM.

=== 106.7 KCR FM ===
They joined 106.7 KCR FM based in Huyton, Liverpool, which was their first slot on an FM station. They presented the KCR Takeover show every Saturday evening between 7 pm and 10 pm. Due to the success of the show, they were asked to change from one evening a week to four evenings a week, Monday to Thursday.

=== 107.6 Juice FM ===
In 2009, shortly after KCR FM closed, they were asked to fill in on various shows on Liverpool's Juice FM. After a short run on Juice, they decided to concentrate on separate projects and didn't present radio again until 2013.

=== Return to FraggleRADIO ===
Lex&Davey made a return in April 2013 to FraggleRADIO, which had also re-launched that year. They presented a show once a week every Wednesday between 7.00 pm and 10.00 pm for a year. In April 2014 they gave up the slot to a different presenter due to other commitments.

=== 102.8 Chorley FM ===
In April 2014 they joined Chorley FM to present Lex&Davey's Morning Chorley every Sunday morning. In December 2014 the Morning Chorley show was expanded across Chorley FM's line-up to cover Monday to Friday as well as Sunday. In August 2015, both Lex and Davey joined the board of directors at Chorley FM in a non-executive capacity after being voted into the position by members of the radio station.

Lex&Davey decided to end the show and step down from the board in March 2016.

=== 92.1 Wirral Radio ===
Between November 2015 and May 2016, Lex&Davey hosted various shows on Wirral Radio.

== Your Big Chance ==
In October 2015 they auditioned for 'Your Big Chance' to win a Friday night show with Radio City, Key 103 and Rock FM. On October 19 they made it into the final of the competition.
