= Chorley FM =

Radio station in Lancashire, England

- Chorley, Lancashire; England
- Broadcast area: Lancashire
- Frequency: 102.8 MHz

Programming
- Format: Community Radio

Ownership
- Owner: Chorley FM Ltd

History
- First air date: 24 November 2006
- Last air date: 1 August 2019

Chorley FM was a radio station based in Chorley, Lancashire, England. The station was created by volunteers back in 2001 to broadcast a special two week licence in conjunction with the Midsummer Festival which was located on Botany Bay near the M61.

== History ==
The name "Chorley FM" is commonly associated with a fictional radio station featured in the comedy programmes That Peter Kay Thing, Phoenix Nights and Max and Paddy's Road to Nowhere. The fictional station uses a logo based on Century FM in the 1990s and the slogan "Coming in Your Ears".

The real-life station Chorley FM, based at Steeley Lane in Chorley, operated for short periods of time each year from 2000 under a temporary restricted service licence.

On 9 September 2005, Chorley FM Limited was awarded a five-year licence to broadcast round the clock to the local community, and was extended for a further five years in 2011. It also broadcast worldwide via the Internet.

The station's target objective was to broadcast to the local population and provide an opportunity to get involved and gain valuable experience in radio and the media.

Shortly after being granted its licence, Chorley FM created a competition in association with the Chorley Citizen newspaper, asking members of the community to design a logo for the station to use throughout its life, which was won by then 15-year-old, Rhys Griffiths. The logo, however, was changed to the current station logo during a full station re-branding exercise completed in February 2008 and then another re-brand in January 2012.

The station launched its full live output on 24 November 2006 on the frequency 102.8 FM, as well as streaming online via the station website.

In February 2008 Chorley FM saw a re-launch and implemented a new daytime music policy consisting of modern chart music, R&B, commercial dance, Indie rock and a few 80s, 90s chart classics. As of May 2011, the music policy relaxed, playing a wider variety of music. From 6pm, more specialist shows are common-place, comprising many forms of Dance music not covered by other radio stations including underground House, Old Skool / Retro House, Garage, Techno, Scouse House, Drum & Bass and Hardstyle. Other shows include the Flat Iron Show (featuring local unsigned bands), a Rock music show, Folk and Irish Music show, Camp classics & 80's Anthems and a sports show.

Chorley FM identified two objective target audiences. 15 to 25 year olds and the local LGBT (Lesbian, Gay, Bisexual & Transgender) community. In late 2007, Chorley FM won the 'Community Service Award' at the National LGBT Health Summit and drew particular mention to the 'Breakout' Show targeted at the LGBT community of Chorley. More LGBT Programmes were included in the schedule, such as 'Camp Classics & 80's Anthems' which played mainly 80s music from the LGBT scene.

In late 2008 Chorley FM worked in Conjunction with Search for a Star (Launched as a joint project with the Daily Star), a talent contest in partnership with Bobby Ball and Casey-Lee Jolleys. The show, hosted by Chorley FM's Nathan Hill and Steven Normyle with celebrity judges that included Bobby Ball, Casey-Lee Jolleys, X-Factor's Rowetta and Garry Bushell. Live theatre style shows took place weekly on the Blackpool North Pier.

2009 saw the station continue to grow with some media attention; including a number of inclusions in reports on Granada Reports and a behind-the-scenes look into volunteering as a young person at Chorley FM as part of the national BBC Blast project.

In 2011 the station was awarded a five-year renewal of its community radio licence.

In 2014 Ofcom told the station that it was not meeting its key commitments. Ofcom's interpretation of the commitments was that the station should exclusively serve the two target groups. The station announced dialogue with Ofcom regarding a change to the original commitments, on the basis that it was always intended to include specific content for the target groups within a diverse schedule rather than all output be exclusively for them.

From March 2015 the station began broadcasting commentary from Chorley F.C. games, linking in with internet-based "Magpies Live", to further their involvement in the local community. This was welcomed by the local community and the town, and will continue to give coverage to the "Magpies" throughout the 2015/16 season, and beyond, in the Vanarama National League North.

Also in 2015 Ofcom approved changes to the key commitments broadening the target audience to include the whole population of Chorley. New shows and community features including Business Lunch were rolled out.

== Closure ==
The station's broadcasting equipment was made out of bounds and broadcasting ceased unexpectedly after a statement was released by the managing director on 1 August. On 14 August 2019, Chorley FM officially surrendered its community radio licence to Ofcom, ending the station's ability to come back on air. This followed a police investigation into allegations of sexual assault at the station that had not been investigated by the Managing Director at the time. Mr Stuart Clutton was contacted for comment on the matter by the local press but issued a no comment response. The complaint made by a former director of the station also included several complaints of sexual harassment.

The former Chorley FM transmitter location and 102.8 FM frequency were brought back into use in May 2021, to relocate the Chorley relay of Capital Manchester and Lancashire, which was previously broadcast at 96.3 FM from Whitehouse Farm.

== See also ==
- Central Radio (Lancashire) – a station which has included Chorley in its coverage area since 1 September 2023
