= Brickell (surname) =

Brickell is a surname. Notable people with the surname include:

- Antonia Brickell, British radio personality
- Barry Brickell (1935–2016), New Zealand potter and writer
- Butch Brickell (1957–2003), American racing driver
- Edie Brickell (born 1966), American singer-songwriter
- Fred Brickell (1906–1961), American baseball player
- Fritz Brickell (1935–1965), American baseball player
- Richard Brickell (born 1975), British sport shooter
- Robert C. Brickell (1824–1900), American jursit from Alabama
- William Brickell (1817–1908), American businessman and city founder

== See also ==
- Brickell Avenue, Miami, Florida
- Brickell Key, a man-made island in Miami
- Brickell station, a rapid transit station in Miami
- Brickell Magazine
