= List of number-one DVDs of 2004 (UK) =

The UK Video Charts named the top-selling DVDs in the United Kingdom for each week in 2004.

Issue date	Number-one Video/DVD
January 5	Pirates of the Caribbean: The Curse of the Black Pearl
January 12	Pirates of the Caribbean: The Curse of the Black Pearl
January 19	Jeepers Creepers 2
January 26	American Pie: The Wedding
February 2	Lara Croft: Tomb Raider – The Cradle of Life
February 9	Calendar Girls
February 16	The League of Extraordinary Gentlemen
February 23	Finding Nemo
March 1	Finding Nemo
March 8	Finding Nemo
March 15	Love Actually
March 22	Love Actually
March 29	The Matrix Revolutions
April 5	Master and Commander: The Far Side of the World
April 12	Master and Commander: The Far Side of the World
April 19	Kill Bill: Volume 1
April 26	Kill Bill: Volume 1
May 3	The Last Samurai
May 10	Brother Bear
May 17	Brother Bear
May 24	The Lord of the Rings: The Return of the King
May 31	The Lord of the Rings: The Return of the King
June 7	The Lord of the Rings: The Return of the King
June 14	Scary Movie 3
June 21	The Haunted Mansion
June 28	The Haunted Mansion
July 5	Cold Mountain
July 12	School of Rock
July 19	Starsky & Hutch
July 26	Starsky & Hutch
August 2	The Simpsons Season 4
August 9	Gothika
August 16	Kill Bill: Volume 2
August 23	Scooby-Doo 2: Monsters Unleashed
August 30	The Passion of the Christ
September 6	Shaun of the Dead
September 13	Shaun of the Dead
September 20	The Star Wars Trilogy
September 27	The Star Wars Trilogy
October 4	That Peter Kay Thing
October 11	Van Helsing
October 18	The Day After Tomorrow
October 25	Troy
November 1	Shrek 2
November 8	Shrek 2
November 15	Harry Potter and the Prisoner of Azkaban
November 22	Harry Potter and the Prisoner of Azkaban
November 29	Harry Potter and the Prisoner of Azkaban
December 6	I, Robot
December 13	The Lord of the Rings: The Return of the King
December 20	Little Britain Season 1
December 27	The Day After Tomorrow
