= Chain Letters =

British television game show (1987–1997)

- Genre: Game show
- Created by: Mark Maxwell-Smith
- Presented by: Jeremy Beadle (1987); Andrew O'Connor (1988); Allan Stewart (1989–90); Ted Robbins (1995); Vince Henderson (1996); Dave Spikey (1997)
- Country of origin: United Kingdom
- Original language: English
- No. of series: 7
- No. of episodes: 336

Production
- Running time: 30 minutes (inc. adverts)
- Production companies: Tyne Tees in association with Barry & Enright Productions and Action Time

Original release
- Network: ITV
- Release: 7 September 1987 – 25 April 1997

Chain Letters is a British television game show produced by Tyne Tees and Barry & Enright Productions. The show was recorded at their City Road studios in Newcastle upon Tyne and first broadcast on ITV in the United Kingdom from 7 September 1987 to 6 July 1990, then again from 2 January 1995 to 25 April 1997.

Three contestants competed to win money by changing letters in given words to form new words. The show's original host was Jeremy Beadle, followed by Andrew O'Connor, Allan Stewart, Ted Robbins, Vince Henderson and Dave Spikey.

A computer named Wordsworth generated words and checked their validity, and occasionally provided the host with definitions of unusual words that came up during the game.

== Gameplay ==
=== Round 1 – Chain Letters ===
The first round was entitled Chain Letters (Make a Chain in the final series). Each contestant chose one of four hidden four-letter words and had 45 seconds to create as long a chain as possible by changing one letter at a time. Proper nouns or plurals were not allowed, and the contestant could not change the same letter position on consecutive plays (so SALE to MALE to MILE was allowed, but SALE to MALE to TALE was not).

Each valid word added £5 to the contestant's score. Words had to appear in the Longman Dictionary of the English Language (Chambers English Dictionary in later series) to be valid. At each step, the contestant had to call out both the letter being changed and its replacement, then say and spell the new word. If a word was invalid, the letter change was undone.

=== Round 2 – Booby Trap ===
Contestants played in descending order of their scores from Round 1. The contestant in control chose one four-letter word from a group of four, then selected one letter to change. Both opponents then secretly wrote down their predictions of the word they thought the contestant would make. The contestant then changed the letter and won £10 if the new word did not match either opponent's prediction. The contestant could then change the word up to twice more for higher stakes, with the opponents' predictions staying the same on each attempt. If the new word matched a prediction at any time, the opponent received the money at stake instead, and the contestant lost it and ended their turn. Both opponents won the money if each of their predictions were correct, or if the contestant formed an illegal word. After the first or second word, the host would encourage contestant to either gamble or stay on the money they won after making a new word.

For all but the last two series, the money at stake doubled on the second and third words, to a maximum of £40. Beyond this point, every word added £10 to the stakes, for a maximum of £30.

=== Round 3 (1995–1997) ===
A third round was added in the revival of Chain Letters in 1995 and would eventually involve two different formats.

==== Chaingang (1995) ====
One contestant was given a four-letter word and had to change one letter to form a new word, which was then given to the next contestant in line. Each valid word awarded 5 points, and each invalid word deducted the same amount. If a contestant formed a word that could not be changed by either opponent, they won ten additional points and received a new word. The round ended after 60 seconds.

==== Add a Letter (1996–1997) ====
Each contestant in turn was given a three-letter word and had to add one letter at a time to create a new word. The added letter could be placed either within the word or at its start or end, but the existing letters could not be rearranged. They won £5 for each valid word and could make up to four plays, for a maximum length of seven letters. If the contestant either chose to stop or created an invalid word, their turn ended.

=== Final Round – Tie the Leader ===
A five-letter word was displayed, with a plus sign at the left end and a minus sign at the right. The host read a toss-up clue whose answer differed from the displayed word by one letter. The change that needed to be made was displayed when a contestant buzzed in. If a letter was highlighted, it needed to be changed. The plus and minus signs indicated that a letter had to be added or removed, respectively, without changing the order of the others. Answers could be three, four, or five letters in length.

Buzzing in also stopped a randomiser that determined the value of the word: £10, £20, £40 (£30 in the last two series), or "Tie," which if hit by the second- or third-place contestant, immediately increased their score to match that of the leader. An incorrect answer gave the opponents a chance to buzz-in.

When the round ended, the contestant in the lead won the game and advanced to the bonus round. All three contestants kept whatever money they had earned in the game. In 1995, however, the players scored points and each runner-up received a portable CD player.

=== Bonus Round – Superchain ===
The contestant was shown a four-letter word with one letter highlighted, and had to change that letter to form a new word. If they passed or gave an invalid word, a different letter would be highlighted. The contestant won £50 for each new word formed, or £1,000 for making 10 changes in 60 seconds.

== Merchandise ==
A board game based on the series was released by Spear's Games in 1990.

== Theme song lyrics ==
The theme was created by Mike Moran. The opening four lines of the lyrics came from Mark Maxwell-Smith and were used in the opening announce of the original U.S. pilot.

Take a word... change a letter...
Do it again... and you've got a chain!
That's how you pla-a-a-ay Chain Letters!
Chain Letters!
Whoa-oa-oa... here's Beadle!

== Transmissions ==
Series	Start date	End date	Episodes	Host
1	7 September 1987	19 February 1988	60	Jeremy Beadle
2	13 October 1988	30 March 1989	24	Andrew O'Connor
3	16 November 1989	4 January 1990	8	Allan Stewart
4	29 May 1990	11 July 1990	32	Allan Stewart
5	2 January 1995	28 April 1995	85	Ted Robbins
6	2 January 1996	3 May 1996	87	Vince Henderson
7	3 March 1997	25 April 1997	40	Dave Spikey

=== Regional transmissions information ===
Chain Letters was the first programme to air in the 9:25am slot; the slot was previously used to air the first programme in the ITV Schools programming block, which was moved to Channel 4.

==== 1987–1988 ====
The first series originally aired Monday to Friday at 9:25am from 7 September to 9 October 1987. The series moved to Monday to Friday at 1:00pm from 4 January to 19 February 1988, with the exception of TVS and Channel, which moved the series to 3:00pm (but not every day), then dropped it in February before airing the remaining episodes over the summer.

==== 1988–1989 ====
The second series aired on Thursdays at 7:30pm. A number of regions aired the series at either 12:30pm (Grampian and Granada) or 5:15pm (Central and Anglia). Scottish originally aired the series on Tuesdays at 7:30pm, then moved to Thursdays at 10:35pm from November to December 1988 and then finally moved to Sundays at 3:00pm in February 1989.

==== 1989–1990 ====
The third series aired on Thursdays at 7:30pm. Scottish aired the series on Wednesdays at 1:30pm from January to March 1990.

==== 1990 & 1995 ====
The fourth and fifth series aired Monday to Friday at 9:25am.

==== 1996 ====
The sixth series aired Monday to Friday, at different times depending upon the viewer's region, since this series was not networked, with the Granada and Border regions airing episodes after a few weeks at 5:10pm on certain days, which took until August to complete.

==== 1997 ====
The seventh series aired Monday to Friday at 9:25am.
