= Vince Henderson =

English television presenter

Vincent P. Henderson is an English television presenter, actor and street performer. He is known for hosting the Sky Sports Saturday morning show Soccer AM, and the 1996 season of ITV's game show Chain Letters. He made his television debut on the CBBC show Dear Mr. Barker in 1995.

== Personal life ==
He married actress Sophie Aldred on 12 July 1997. They have two sons, Adam and William, who make occasional convention appearances with their mother.

== Career ==
In 1998, he appeared in the Reeltime Pictures video release of Where on Earth Is... Katy Manning Because She'd Really Like to Know as himself. In 2000, he played the role of Mick Thompson in The Fearmonger, a Big Finish Doctor Who audio play, alongside Aldred and McCoy.

Prior to 2008, Henderson presented Off the Rails on Discovery Real Time, where he visited heritage steam railways in Britain, such as the Severn Valley Railway, the North Norfolk Railway and the Colne Valley Railway.

Preceded by Ted Robbins	Host of Chain Letters; 1996	Succeeded by Dave Spikey
