= Dave Spikey =

English comedian and actor (born 1951)

- Born: David Gordon Bramwell; 6 October 1951 (age 74); Farnworth, Bolton, Lancashire, England
- Notable work: That Peter Kay Thing (2000); Phoenix Nights (2001–02); Dead Man Weds (2005); Bullseye (2006)
- Spouse: Kathleen Kenyon

Comedy career
- Years active: 1990–present
- Medium: Stand-up, television
- Genre: Observational comedy
- Website: davespikey.co.uk

Dave Spikey (born David Gordon Bramwell, 6 October 1951) is an English comedian, actor, writer and film producer. He is best known for his stand-up comedy, writing and starring in the British comedy programme Phoenix Nights, presenting Bullseye and Chain Letters, and serving as team captain for the first four series of 8 Out of 10 Cats.

== Biography ==
=== Early career ===
Born in Farnworth, Lancashire, Spikey spent his early career working as a biomedical scientist in the haematology laboratory at Bolton General Hospital. It was during this period in the 1980s that he scripted and performed in a number of amateur pantomimes with a group of like-minded health workers called the Bolton Health Performers.

Early in his career Spikey won a talent show called Stairway to the Stars with a routine about juggling on a motorbike, judged by comedian Larry Grayson who took him aside to tell him he had potential and his routine was fantastic. Spikey was inspired to pursue a part-time comedy career while working at Bolton General Hospital.

In 1992, Spikey was asked to form a double act with Rick Sykes, purely as a 'one-off' to support a popular musical duo called 'Intaglio'. Dave and Rick were known as Spikey and Sykey. The double act's most notable success came on Central TV's New Faces show.

In 1993, Spikey was voted "best up and coming comedian" by the Manchester Evening News.

In 1996, Spikey first met Peter Kay, with whom he would later collaborate, at the North-West Comedian of the Year Awards, which Kay won that year and Spikey was compèring.

He was the final host of UK gameshow Chain Letters in 1997.

=== Success ===
Spikey won the Best Newcomer award at the British Comedy Awards, and then co-wrote and starred in Phoenix Nights on Channel Four as Jerry St. Clair. In 2003, Spikey released his first DVD, The Overnight Success Tour. 2003 was also the year he won ‘Best Comedy Performance at Leicester Comedy Festival 2003’, an award he describes as “the weirdest trophy I’ve got on my shelf.”

In late 2004, he wrote the ITV comedy-drama Dead Man Weds (2005), in which he also co-starred with Johnny Vegas. The drama follows the attempts of the new editor (Spikey) of the local newspaper, The Fogburrow Advertiser and News, to drum up excitement in the area to cover in his paper, to the disdain and disinterest of his lead (and only) reporter (Vegas). Nancy Banks-Smith described the drama as "endearing and cheerful".

In 2005, Spikey became one of the regular team captains on the comedy panel game, 8 Out of 10 Cats, leaving before the 2007 series. That year also saw the release of his second live DVD, Living the Dream.

In 2006, Spikey became the host of a revived version of the darts-based quiz show Bullseye. The show ran for two series on Challenge to generally unfavourable reviews, The Guardian calling it an "abhorrent reboot".

Spikey developed two new projects which were commissioned by the BBC: Magnolia, a sitcom about painters and decorators, and Footballers Lives – a comedy about a pub football team, neither made it beyond pilots. He was also on the panel for talent show When Will I Be Famous? He returned to stand-up and live shows again and has regularly released DVDs of his shows. His chosen subject on Celebrity Mastermind in 2006 was human blood; he won.

In 2010, Spikey was voted into the Channel 4 100 Greatest Stand-Ups by the British public.

In 2017, he appeared as a self-obsessed businessman, Mr Gruff, in British romantic comedy film Finding Fatimah.

Spikey celebrated 30 years in stand-up with a new retrospective, Juggling on a Motorbike which began touring in 2017. The title refers to his first live performances which began his career in comedy, a routine which he recreates at the end of his show. The show is largely autobiographical and follows his performances over the past 30 years of stand-up.

=== Other interests ===
Spikey was patron of the non-profit radio station Chorley FM (not to be confused with the fictitious radio station made famous by That Peter Kay Thing and Phoenix Nights). The radio station was closed down in 2019.

Spikey's first book, He Took My Kidney, Then Broke My Heart, was published in October 2009 by Michael O'Mara Books. This was followed in 2010 by an autobiography, Under the Microscope: My Life from the same publisher.

Spikey is a supporter of the League Against Cruel Sports and appeared in a short film for the group in 2013. He has been quoted: "It is shocking to think anyone would want to turn the clock back to a time when chasing animals to exhaustion and encouraging them to be ripped apart by a pack of dogs for sport was legal." He describes himself as a “devout vegetarian and animal lover” as well as being the patron of Pet Rehome, a Bolton-based animal rescue centre.

== Stand-up DVDs ==
Title	Released	Notes
Overnight Success Tour – Live	17 November 2003	Live at Leeds City Varieties
Living the Dream – Live	7 November 2005	Live at Oldham Coliseum
The Best Medicine Tour – Live	9 November 2009	Live at Mansfield Palace Theatre

Preceded by Jim Bowen	Host of Bullseye; 2006	Succeeded by Freddie Flintoff
Preceded by Vince Henderson	Host of Chain Letters; 1997	Succeeded by Series ended
