= Leverhulme Park =

Park in Bolton, Greater Manchester, England

- Location within Greater Manchester
- Type: Public park
- Location: Bolton, Greater Manchester, England
- Coordinates: 53°34′32″N 2°23′57″W
- Area: 13.75 hectares
- Operator: Bolton MBC
- Status: Open all year

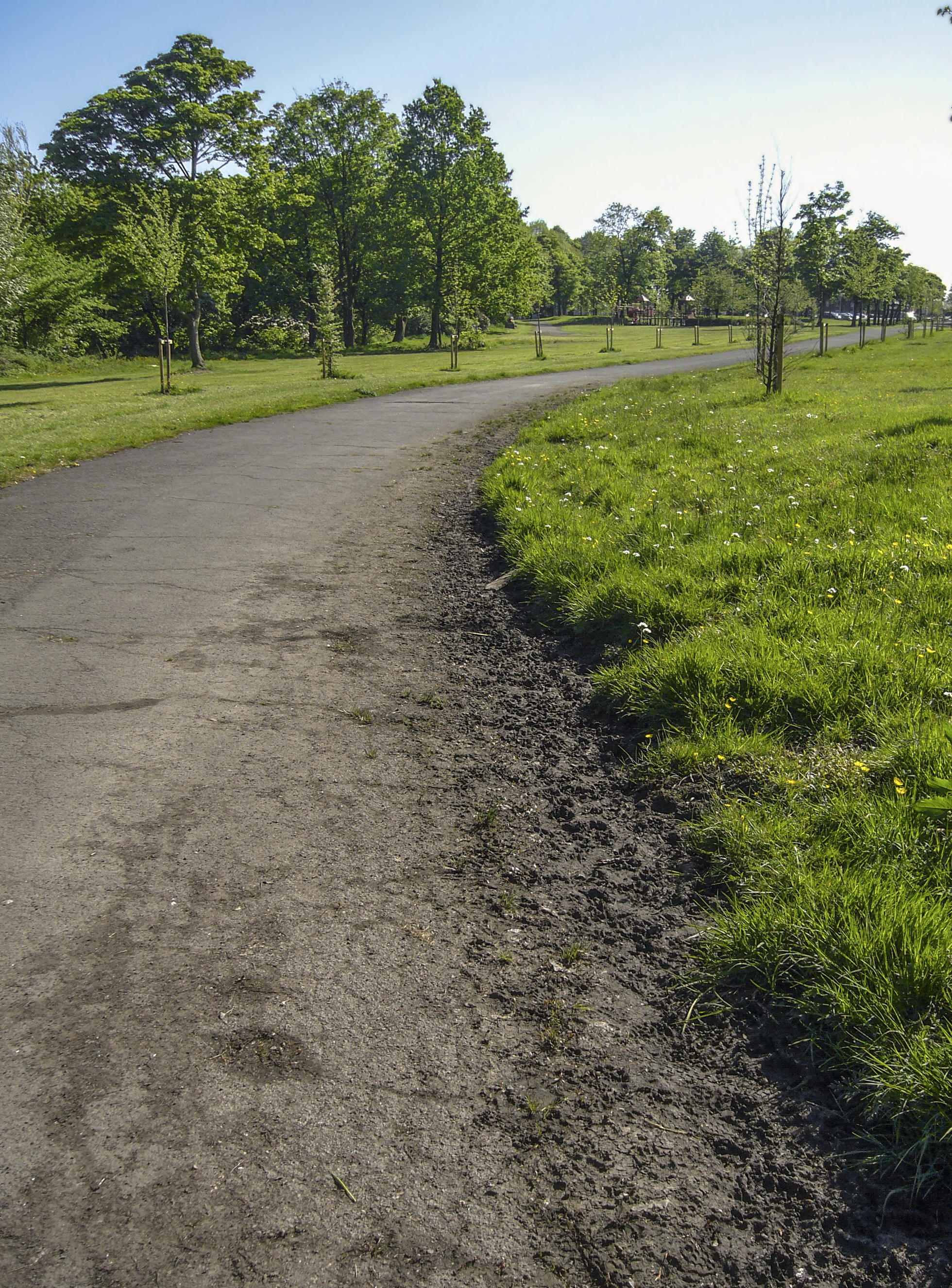

Leverhulme Park is the largest park in the town of Bolton, Greater Manchester. It was donated to the people of Bolton by, and named after, the late Lord Leverhulme. The park is bounded by the Breightmet, Darcy Lever, the Haulgh, and Tonge Fold. Since its earlier days as simply a park, Leverhulme Park has diversified. It is now home to a community centre, an athletics stadium and five-a-side football pitches. It was also the home to the Bolton Show which ran intermittently for more than fifty years.

== Bolton Show ==
The Bolton Show grew out of an old agricultural show of the 1950s held to allow local horticultural, flower and vegetable societies to show off their produce. The Bolton Show was held every August in Leverhulme Park until 2003. The Bolton Show was made famous by That Peter Kay Thing: part of the episode The Ice-Cream Man Cometh was set at Bolton Show. In modern times it regularly attracted crowds of up to 90,000. It included craft tents, displays by a number of professional entertainers including motorbike display teams, stunt performers, falconry, and dog handlers, a large amusement fair, car boot sales and a closing firework display. The Bolton show was planned to return in the summer of 2006, but was cancelled due to lack of local council funds.

== Bolton One Big Weekend ==
Bolton's One Big Weekend was a weekend of family fun days held on Leverhulme Park. Organisers estimated around 20,000 people turned out to the event. The weekend included quadbike racing, bungee jumping, tank rides, a vintage car show, morris dancing, martial arts displays and a dog show.

== Sport ==
A parkrun takes place in the park every Saturday morning starting at 9 am.
