= Red Nose Day 2017 =

Fundraising event organised by Comic Relief

- Also known as: Red Nose Day 2017: Make Your Laugh Matter
- Genre: Telethon
- Presented by: Lenny Henry; Romesh Ranganathan; Graham Norton; Jonathan Ross; Miranda Hart; Sally Phillips; Luisa Omielan; Rob Beckett; Warwick Davis; Richard Osman; Greg Davies; Russell Brand; Noel Fielding
- Country of origin: United Kingdom
- Original language: English

Production
- Executive producer: Richard Curtis
- Production location: Building Six at The O2
- Camera setup: Multiple
- Running time: 7 hours, 30 Minutes (450 minutes)

Original release
- Network: BBC One, BBC Two
- Release: 24 March – 25 March 2017

Related
- Red Nose Day 2015; Red Nose Day 2019; Let's Sing and Dance for Comic Relief

Red Nose Day 2017 was a fund-raising event organised by Comic Relief, broadcast live on BBC One and BBC Two from the evening of 24 March 2017 to early the following morning. This 2017 edition of Red Nose Day was part of the "Make Your Laugh Matter" campaign. It was held on Friday 24 March till Saturday 25 March 2017 from 7:00 pm to 2:30 am on BBC One.

== Location and format ==
Following the closure of BBC Television Centre in 2013, Comic Relief has had to look for new venues to host the annual telethons as they were previously filmed live from Studio One. Sport Relief 2014 was the first not to be filmed at Television Centre, but at the Copper Box in London's Olympic Park. As a result, Red Nose Day 2015 came live, for the first time in its history, from the heart of London in its most prestigious theatre, the London Palladium.

For the 2017 telethon the broadcast was moved from the London Palladium to Building Six at The O2. This choice of venue, otherwise known as the "Comedy Superclub", also marks the change in tone and format of this year's telethon from an entertainment programme hosted by television presenters back to its original format, a comedy show hosted by comedians. This change in tone is also seen in the hosting line up which is dominated by comedians rather than presenters and for the first time in over 10 years does not feature Davina McCall or Claudia Winkleman.

== Before main event ==
=== Television and Radio ===
==== #RedOut ====
For Red Nose Day 2017, 35 of Britain's biggest vloggers and bloggers took part in the Comic Relief campaign branded as #RedOut. On Sunday 12 March, big social media names such as Zoella, Alfie Deyes and Marcus Butler went offline for 24 hours to promote the charity. The social media personalities used their platforms to promote an exciting video they would be uploading at 6pm, shocking fans with a short 7 second video and a link to the charity's website. They signed off their accounts urging followers to donate and get involved before returning in 24 hours with Red Nose Day themed videos for their subscribers.

== Main event ==
=== Presenters ===
Time	Presenters
19:00-22:00	Lenny Henry, Jonathan Ross, Miranda Hart, Luisa Omielan, Sally Phillips, Rob Beckett, Romesh Ranganathan, Richard Osman, Greg Davies and Warwick Davis
22:00-22:35	Greg Davies
22:35-00:30	Graham Norton
00:30-01:35	Russell Brand
01:35-03:05	Jonathan Ross and Noel Fielding

=== Schedule ===
The telethon has traditionally taken the format of one broadcast with various presenting teams hosting for typically an hour at a time introducing a variety of sketches and appeal films. The 2017 broadcast differed as the broadcast was split into separate sections, with separate hosts, focusing on a specific theme or skit rather than featuring numerous sketches, appeal films and performances.

Time	Show	Description
19:00-22:00	Red Nose Day 2017	Lenny Henry, Jonathan Ross, Miranda Hart, Luisa Omielan, Sally Phillips, Rob Beckett, Romesh Ranganathan, Richard Osman, Greg Davies and Warwick Davis present the traditional Red Nose Day broadcast featuring sketches, live performances and appeal films.
22:00-22:35	Greg Davies' Hot Tub Half-Hour	Greg Davies hosts from a hot tub on the top of The O2 with live comedy sketches and interviews. With guests Tom Daley and Kaiser Chiefs frontman Ricky Wilson.
22:35-00:30	Graham Norton's Big Chat Live	Graham Norton supersizes his chat show with a ludicrously long sofa to be filled with more star guests than ever before.
00:30-01:35	Russell Brand's Stand Off	Russell Brand introduces more live comedy as he welcomes the seven hottest stand-up acts in the UK to the Comic Relief stage.
01:35-03:05	Fantastic Beats and Where to Find Them	Jonathan Ross and Noel Fielding join forces to look back at some very special Comic Relief musical memories from the past 30 years.

=== Appeal films ===
Russell Howard, Ed Sheeran, Emeli Sandé, Miranda Hart and Sara Cox fronted the appeal films for the 2017 telethon.

Film name	Issue Covered	Description	Presenter
TBC			

=== Sketches and features ===
Title	Brief description	Starring
Red Nose Day Actually	13 years after the film Love Actually, in this mini sequel we return to the lives of the Actually films most iconic characters	Hugh Grant, Colin Firth, Liam Neeson, Bill Nighy, Rowan Atkinson, Keira Knightley, Andrew Lincoln, Chiwetel Ejiofor, Martine McCutcheon, Kate Moss, Marcus Brigstocke, Jo Whiley, Robert Peston, Caspar Lee, Alfie Deyes, Louise Pentland and Niomi Smart
French and Saunders	The iconic comedy duo return in a special sketch	Dawn French and Jennifer Saunders
Micky and Joe's Pizza	Micky Flanagan and Joe Lycett take over and attempt to run a local pizza restaurant for the evening	Micky Flanagan and Joe Lycett
Carpool Karaoke	From The Late Late Show in the US, James Corden teams up with Take That for a very special Carpool Karaoke	James Corden, Gary Barlow, Mark Owen and Howard Donald
People Just Do Nothing	Chabuddy G arranges for MC Grindah, DJ Beats and the Kurupt FM crew to collaborate with a huge 'urban artist' on a special track for Comic Relief. But things don't quite go to plan when the urban artist turns out to be someone totally unexpected, Ed Sheeran. The world premiere of the music video was shown exclusively on this night.	Allan Mustafa, Hugo Chegwin, Asim Chaudhry and Ed Sheeran
The Stotts LIVE	Vic Reeves and Bob Mortimer bring back the jittery, bickering brothers from Shildon to interview a special celebrity guest in The Stotts Live	Vic Reeves, Bob Mortimer and Susanna Reid
Catherine Tate	Catherine Tate provides the laughs	Catherine Tate
Toast of London	Matt Berry voices an appeal film and meets Clem Fandango's half-brother, who looks strangely familiar.	Matt Berry
Mrs. Brown	Mrs. Brown returns with a special preview of her new BBC One chat show All Round to Mrs. Brown's	Brendan O'Carroll
Middle Class The Jeremy Kyle Show	Middle class Jeremy Kyle takes the real Jeremy Kyle to task in front of his baying studio audience. The accusation? That Jeremy Kyle has stolen all of Dominic Littlewood's viewers from BBC One's Caught Red Handed because Jeremy "shouts loudly at his guests"	Jeremy Kyle, Dominic Littlewood and David Walliams
The World Cup of Biscuits 2017	Richard Osman hosts the Biscuit World Cup which aims to find the champion biscuit of 2017. After opening the vote on Twitter for the Pool Matches in the days leading up to Red Nose Day, Richard and an expert team present the results for the Quarter-Finals, Semi-Finals and Final live from the studio	Richard Osman
Peter Kay's Car Share	Peter Kay provides an exclusive look at the second series of Car Share plus he will be sharing exciting news about how Comic Relief will benefit from the new series	Peter Kay
Let's Sing and Dance for Comic Relief	Mel and Sue will be joining the fun from the Let's Sing And Dance studio in anticipation of the live final the following night (Saturday 25 March)	Mel Giedroyc and Sue Perkins
Alan Partridge	Everyone's favourite radio DJ returns for some more Mid-Morning Matters	Steve Coogan
Smack the Pony	For the first time since 2003, Fiona Allen, Doon Mackichan and Sally Phillips reunite to perform a series of sketches from the popular comedy show	Sally Phillips, Fiona Allen and Doon Mackichan
Philomena Cunk: Moment Of Wonder	Philomena Cunk delivers a special Moment Of Wonder focusing on charity, grilling Richard Curtis about Comic Relief	Diane Morgan and Richard Curtis
Hecklers Anonymous	A sketch following a community support group trying their best to give up their addiction to heckling	Laurence Rickard, Frankie Boyle, Russell Brand and Rebecca Front
This Country	The hottest new comedy on BBC Three takes a special look at Comic Relief through the eyes of Kerry and Kurtan Mucklowe	Daisy May Cooper and Charlie Cooper
W1A	W1A staff discuss and plan how to get the nation involved in the funniest Red Nose Day ever	Jessica Hynes
Stephen Hawking's New Voice	Professor Stephen Hawking is on the hunt for a new voice.	Stephen Hawking, Liam Neeson, Rebel Wilson, Anna Kendrick, Stephen Fry, Simon Cowell, Gordon Ramsay, Andrew Lloyd Webber, Miss Piggy, Geri Halliwell, Kylie Minogue, Felicity Jones, John Boyega, Eddie Redmayne and Michael Caine
The Making of Red Nose Day Actually	Go behind the scenes of the biggest sketch of Comic Relief 2017	As listed above
Innuendo Bingo	Scott Mills hosts a special version of the game live	Scott Mills, Chris Stark and Joel Dommett

=== Musical performances ===
Artist	Song	
Ed Sheeran	"What Do I Know?"	
Rag'n'Bone Man	"Skin"	
London Grammar	"Truth Is a Beautiful Thing"	
Emeli Sandé	"Highs & Lows"	
Jayde Adams	"Nessun Dorma"	Comedy act
The Brett Domino Trio	"Boombastic"	Comedy act

=== Cast ===
- Fiona Allen
- Rowan Atkinson
- Gary Barlow
- Rob Beckett
- Matt Berry
- Frankie Boyle
- Katy Brand
- Russell Brand
- Billy Connolly
- Steve Coogan
- James Corden
- Sara Cox
- Richard Curtis
- Tom Daley
- Greg Davies
- Cara Delevingne
- Hugh Dennis
- Joel Dommett
- Howard Donald
- Chiwetel Ejiofor
- Noel Fielding
- Colin Firth
- Micky Flanagan
- Dawn French
- Rebecca Front
- Stephen Fry
- Hugh Grant
- Mel Giedroyc
- Miranda Hart
- Stephen Hawking
- Lenny Henry
- Jessica Hynes
- Russell Kane
- Peter Kay
- Anna Kendrick
- Keira Knightley
- Jeremy Kyle
- Andrew Lincoln
- Dominic Littlewood
- Joe Lycett
- Doon Mackichan
- Martine McCutcheon
- Kate Moss
- Diane Morgan
- Bob Mortimer
- Liam Neeson
- Bill Nighy
- Graham Norton
- Brendan O'Carroll
- Luisa Omielan
- Richard Osman
- Mark Owen
- Sue Perkins
- Sally Phillips
- Rag'n'Bone Man
- Gordon Ramsay
- Romesh Ranganathan
- Jonathan Ross
- Emeli Sandé
- Jennifer Saunders
- Ed Sheeran
- Catherine Tate
- David Tennant
- Johnny Vegas
- David Walliams
- Rebel Wilson
- Ricky Wilson
- Reggie Yates
