= Red Nose Day 2019 =

Fundraising event organised by Comic Relief

- Genre: Telethon
- Presented by: Lenny Henry; Emma Willis; Paddy McGuinness; Zoe Ball; David Tennant; Alesha Dixon; Romesh Ranganathan; Clara Amfo; Rob Beckett; Joe Sugg
- Country of origin: United Kingdom
- Original language: English

Production
- Executive producer: Richard Curtis
- Production location: BBC Elstree Centre
- Camera setup: Multiple
- Running time: 8 hours, 30 minutes

Original release
- Network: BBC One, BBC Two
- Release: 15 March – 16 March 2019

Related
- Red Nose Day 2017; Red Nose Day 2021

Red Nose Day 2019 was a fundraising event organised by Comic Relief, broadcast live from BBC Elstree Centre on BBC One and BBC Two from the evening of 15 March 2019 to early the following morning. The event was broadcast from 7:00 pm to 2:30 am, and raised £63,548,668 for charity.

== Main event ==
=== Presenters ===
Time	Presenters
19:00–20:00	Lenny Henry, Paddy McGuinness and Emma Willis
20:00–21:00	Zoe Ball and David Tennant
21:00–22:00	Alesha Dixon and Romesh Ranganathan
22:35–00:55	Lenny Henry, Clara Amfo, Rob Beckett and Joe Sugg

=== Schedule ===
The telethon has traditionally taken the format of one broadcast with various presenting teams hosting typically for an hour at a time introducing a variety of sketches and appeal films. Since 2017, the broadcast has been split into different sections, with separate hosts, focusing on a specific theme or skit rather than featuring numerous sketches, appeal films and performances.

Time	Show	Description
19:00–22:00	Red Nose Day 2019	Lenny Henry, Paddy McGuinness, Emma Willis, Zoe Ball, David Tennant, Alesha Dixon and Romesh Ranganathan present the traditional Red Nose Day broadcast featuring sketches, live performances and appeal films.
22:00–22:30	Comic Relief 2019 Does University Challenge	Comedians and entertainers take part in a charity edition of University Challenge, presented by David Baddiel on BBC Two.
22:35–00:55	Red Nose Day 2019	Lenny Henry, Clara Amfo, Rob Beckett and Joe Sugg present the traditional Red Nose Day broadcast featuring sketches, live performances and appeal films, with a more adult-themed approach.
00:55–01:55	Killimanjaro: The Bigger Red Nose Climb	Nine celebrities attempt to reach the summit of Africa's tallest mountain, Mt. Killimanjaro, to raise money for Comic Relief, 10 years after a similar event in 2009.
01:55–03:25	Celebrity Apprentice for Comic Relief	Ten celebrity candidates take part in a Red Nose Day edition of The Apprentice to raise money for Comic Relief.

=== Appeal films ===
Ed Sheeran, Lenny Henry, Stacey Dooley, Shirley Ballas and Romesh Ranganathan fronted the appeal films for the 2019 telethon.

=== Sketches and features ===
Title	Brief description	Starring
Celebrity Apprentice for Comic Relief	Ten celebrity candidates take part in a two-part mini-series to host a charity evening to raise money for Comic Relief. The second half saw the celebrities take part in 'The Boardroom', where one celebrity was fired. The event raised £400,000 for Comic Relief.	Alan Sugar, Karren Brady, Claude Littner, Amanda Holden, Ayda Field, Kelly Hoppen, Rachel Johnson, Tameka Empson, Omid Djalili, Richard Arnold, Rylan Clark-Neal, Russell Kane and Sam Allardyce.
Killimanjaro: The Bigger Red Nose Climb	Ten years after the first climb, nine celebrities climbed to the summit of Africa's tallest mountain, Mt. Killimanjaro, and raised over £2 million for Comic Relief. The event was first broadcast on 13 March, and was repeated during the appeal on 15 March.	Shirley Ballas, Ed Balls, Jade Thirlwall & Leigh-Anne Pinnock from Little Mix, Dan Walker, Anita Rani, Dani Dyer, Alexander Armstrong and Osi Umenyiora.
One Red Nose Day and a Wedding	25 years after its original release, most of the original cast of Four Weddings and a Funeral recreated a short sequel for Comic Relief, which was well-received by the public.	Hugh Grant, Andie MacDowell, Rowan Atkinson, Kristin Scott Thomas, James Fleet, John Hannah, Alicia Vikander and Lily James.
Mamma Mia! Here We Go Yet Again	Celebrities re-enact the 2018 movie, Mamma Mia! Here We Go Again, for a Comic Relief special, similar to the 2009 sketch, featuring some of ABBA's biggest hits.	Jennifer Saunders, Alan Carr, Joanna Lumley, Miranda Hart, Sue Perkins, Susan Calman, Carey Mulligan, Philip Glenister, Lucy Montgomery, Gemma Arterton, Joe Thomas, and Tom Hollander.
Red Nose Bodyguard	Richard Madden returns as PPO David Budd, who has the task of protecting the Prime Minister, in a Comic Relief episode of award-winning British drama Bodyguard.	Richard Madden, Keeley Hawes, Joanna Lumley and Sanjeev Bhaskar.
Comic Relief Does University Challenge	Two teams of celebrities take part in a Red Nose Day special of quiz show University Challenge, presented by comedian David Baddiel instead of Jeremy Paxman. This 35-minute segment aired on BBC Two at 10:00pm during the news on BBC One.	David Baddiel, Jason Manford, Vick Hope, Darren Harriott, Emily Atack, Martin Freeman, Luisa Omielan, Kerry Godliman and Robert Rinder.
Tess & Claudia's 24-hour Danceathon	Strictly Come Dancing presenters Tess Daly and Claudia Winkleman danced continuously for 24 hours, the final five shown live during the telethon, and raised more than £1 million for Comic Relief.	Tess Daly and Claudia Winkleman.
Freddie's Top Gear Wind-Up	Freddie Flintoff pranks ex-footballer Robbie Savage in a spoof edition of Top Gear.	Freddie Flintoff and Robbie Savage.

=== Musical performances ===
Artist	Song
Emeli Sandé	"Sparrow"
Keane	"Somewhere Only We Know"
Rae Morris	"She Used to Be Mine"
The cast of Magic Mike (interrupted by Johnny Vegas)	Medley of songs from Magic Mike, LIVE!
Marti Pellow	"Love Is All Around"

Main presenters gallery

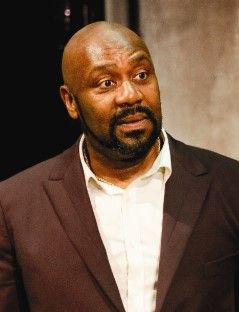
Lenny Henry

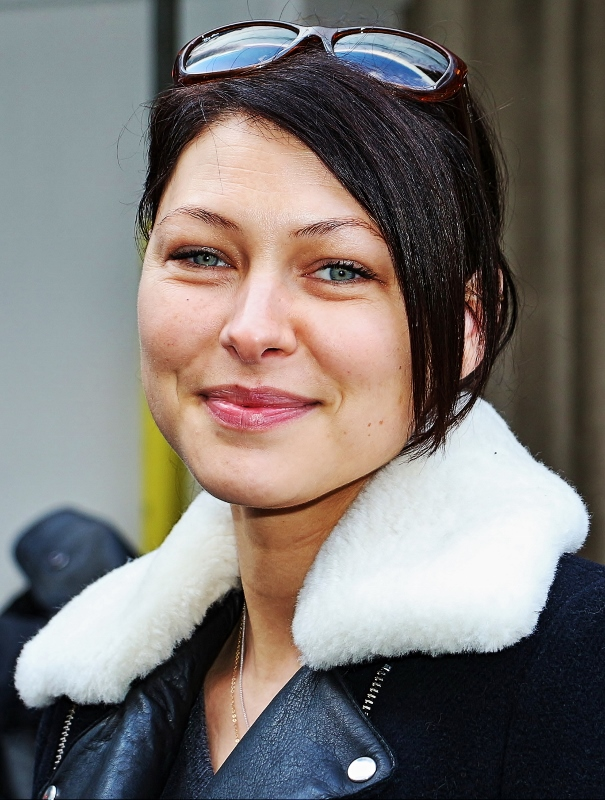
Emma Willis

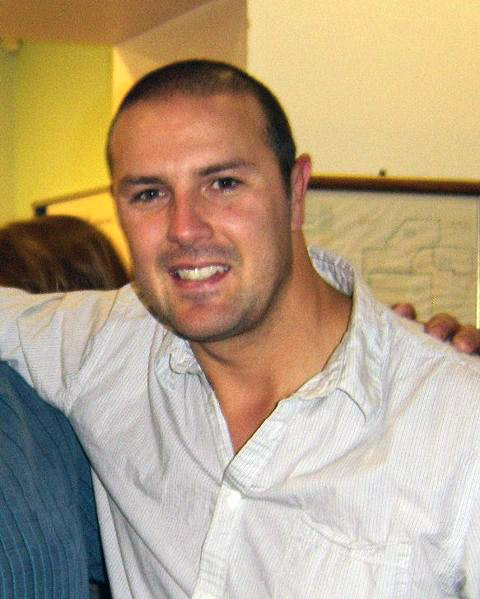
Paddy McGuinness

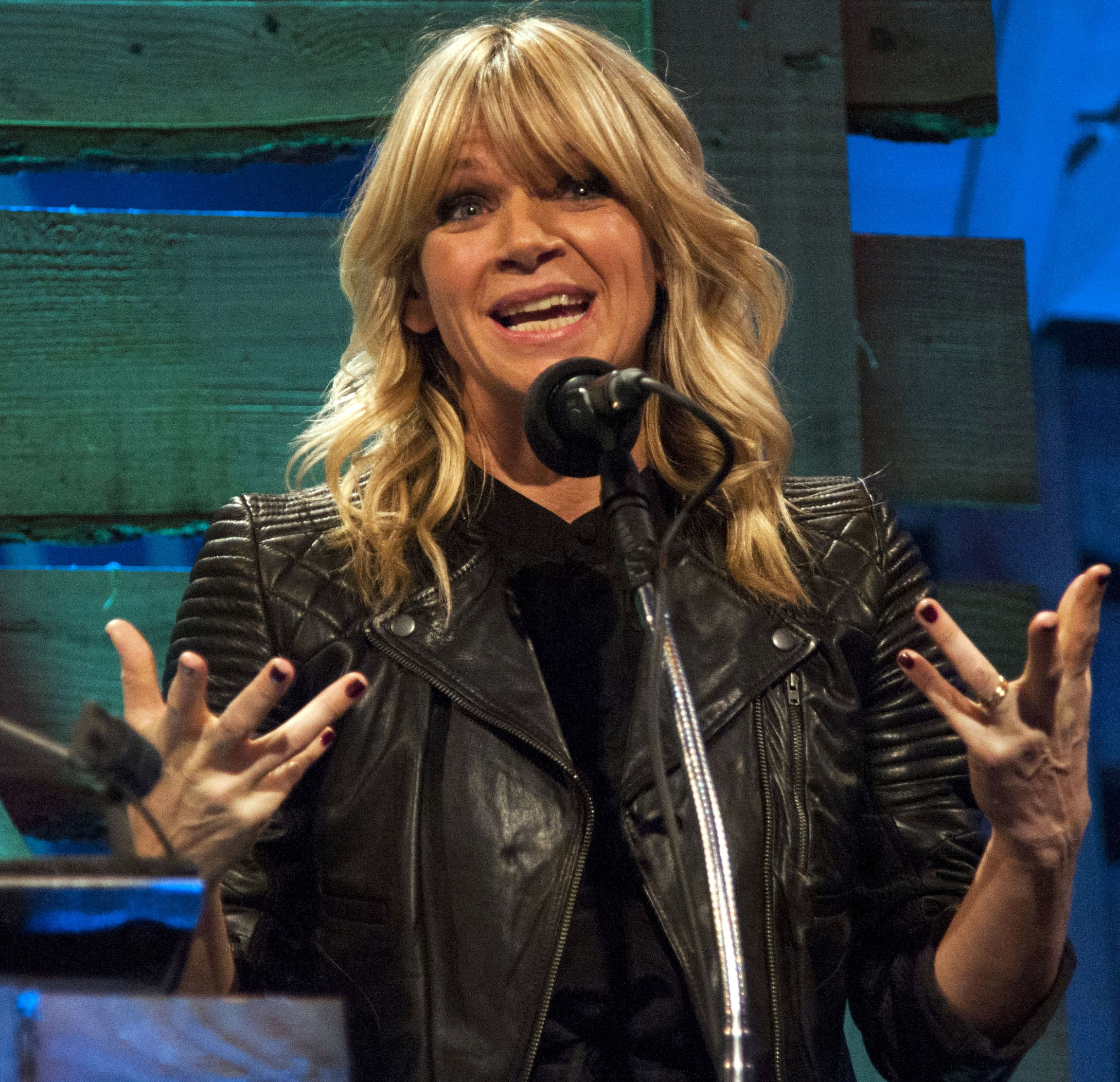
Zoe Ball

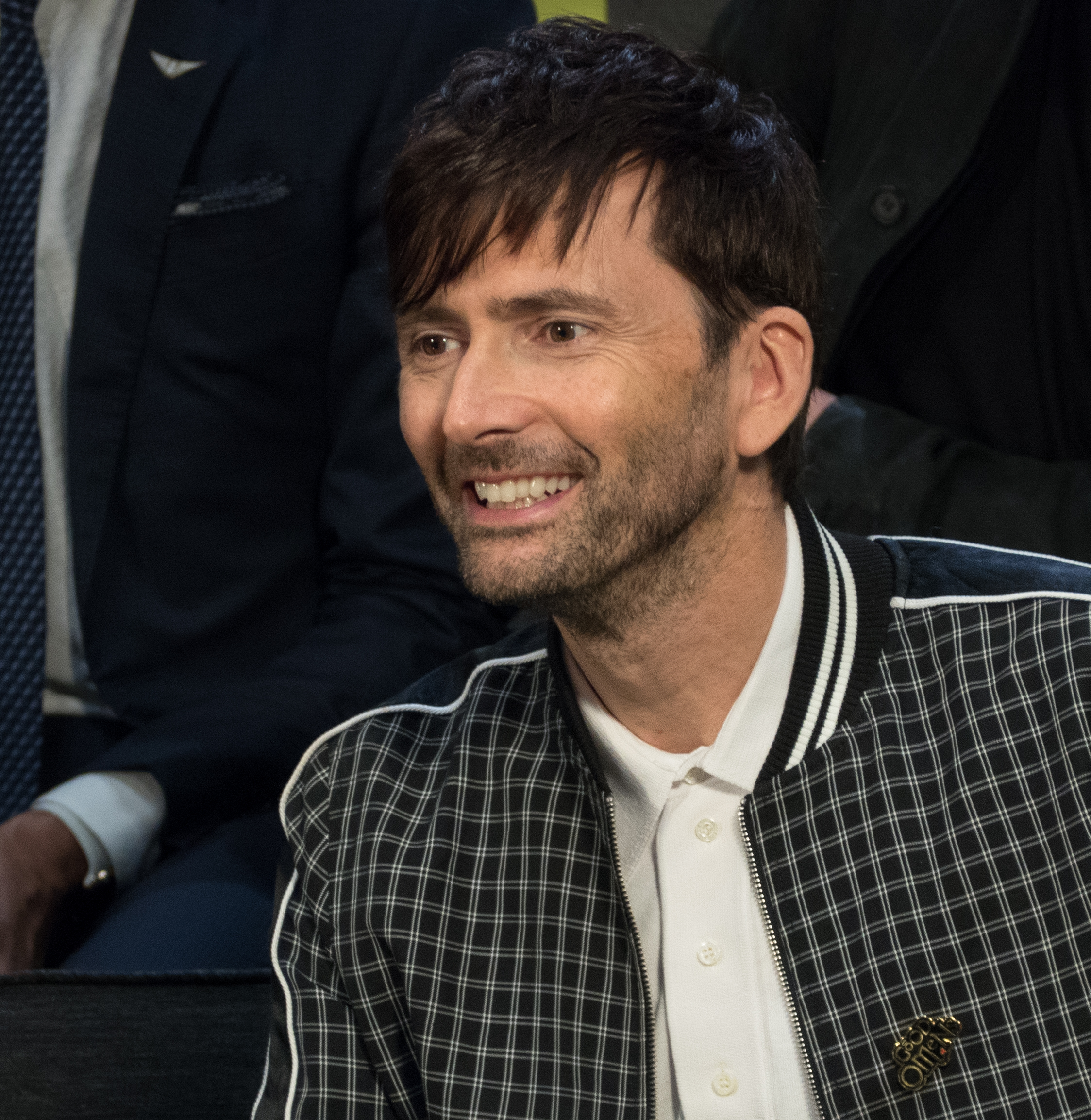
David Tennant

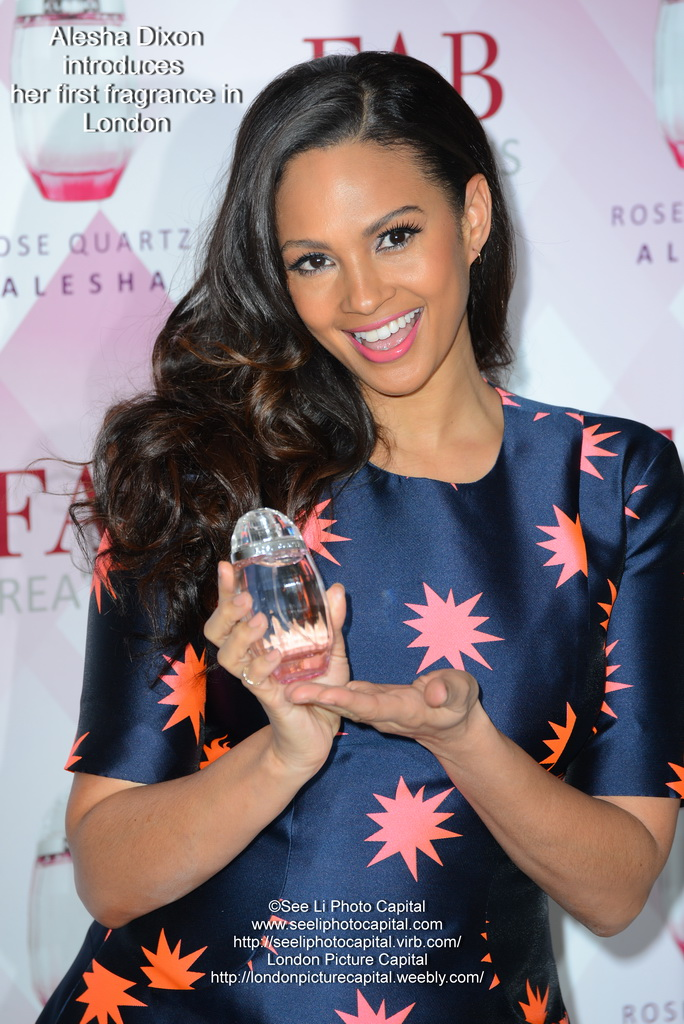
Alesha Dixon

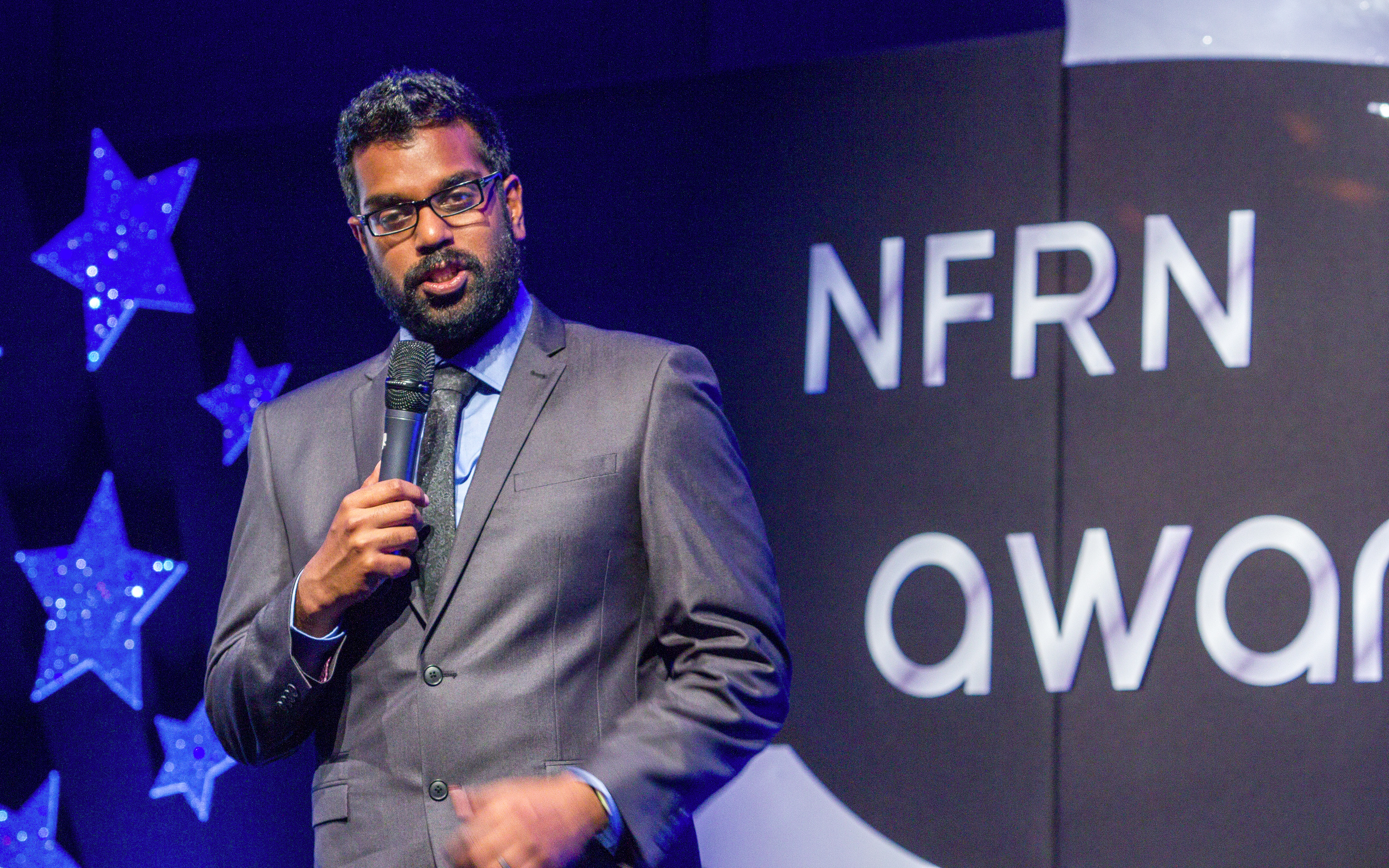
Romesh Ranganathan

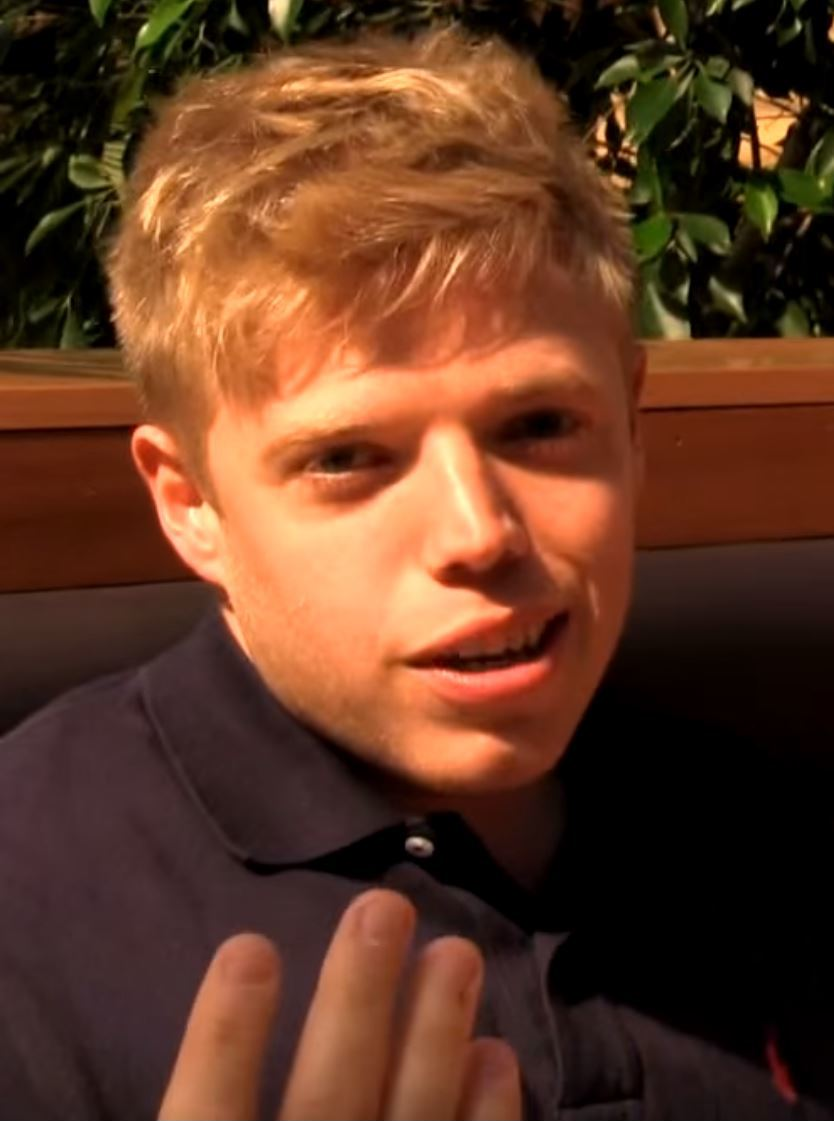
Rob Beckett

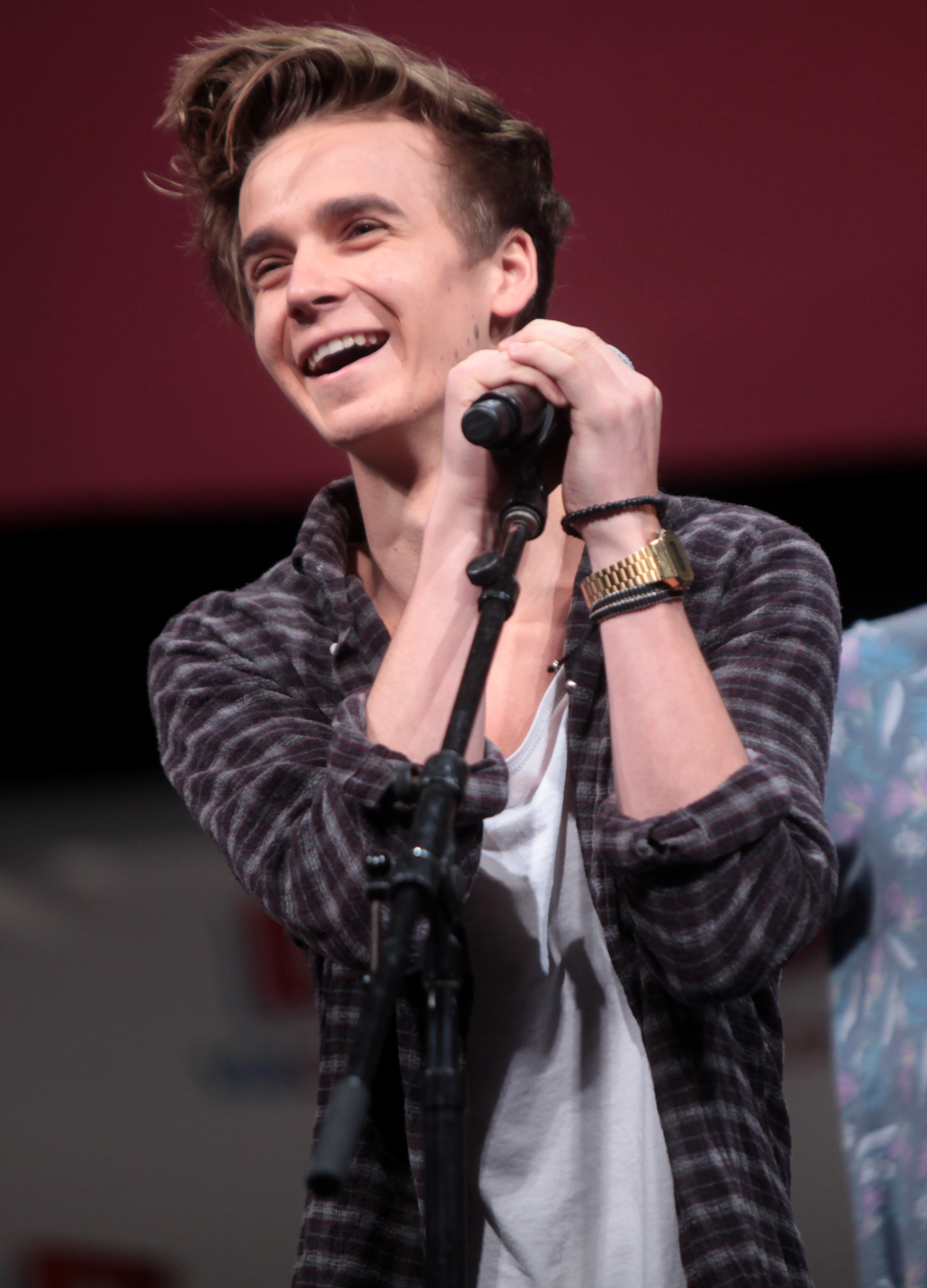
Joe Sugg
