= Toby Foster =

English comedic actor

- Born: 13 August 1969 (age 57); Rotherham, South Yorkshire, England
- Education: Barnburgh Junior School; Lacewood Primary School, Dearneside; Comprehensive & Wath Comprehensive
- Occupation: Breakfast radio show presenter
- Employer: BBC
- Known for: Broadcasting

Toby Foster (born 13 August 1969) is a British comedian, actor, radio presenter, promoter and festival producer. He is best known for his long-running BBC Radio Sheffield show, and for his appearances in the television work of Peter Kay.

== Early life ==
Foster went to the Barnburgh Junior School, followed by Lacewood Primary School, Dearneside Comprehensive and Wath Comprehensive in Rotherham.

== Radio ==
Foster was the host of BBC Radio Sheffield's breakfast show since 2004. He originally joined the station in the afternoon slot, from 2 until 5pm, taking over from Tony Capstick on 2 April 2002. He then worked with Antonia Brickell on a joint breakfast show in September 2004. His current breakfast show is called Toby Foster at Breakfast (formally Toby Foster Bigger at Breakfast). The show is aired from 06:00-10:00 every weekday. He has been nominated for three Radio Academy Awards: The Entertainment Award in 2004, Best Interview Award in 2010, and Sony Speech Broadcaster of the Year in 2012. In 2020 Foster won for Best Speech Breakfast Show, but was unable to attend due to suffering an "ADHD meltdown".

Foster was suspended from Radio Sheffield in December 2013 after using an offensive word on his Twitter account, in reference to a fellow BBC employee. He returned in January 2014 after making an apology to his colleagues and the public.

Foster now hosts an afternoon show across BBC Local Radio in Yorkshire on BBC Radio Sheffield, BBC Radio Leeds and BBC Radio York.

== Film and television ==
Foster appeared in Channel 4's Phoenix Nights as Les Campbell, one half of the club's backing band, Les Alanos. Foster had worked with show creator and star Peter Kay on That Peter Kay Thing and went on to work with him on Max and Paddy's Road to Nowhere. He is affectionately referred to as "One-Take" Toby by friend and co-star Peter Kay, because of his belief that he never gets his lines wrong.

Foster made a cameo as "Northern Comic" in the 2007 Christmas Special of BBC Television series Extras. His character appeared as a contestant in the reality show Celebrity Big Brother, alongside co-writer and star Gervais' Andy Millman, Lionel Blair, Lisa Scott-Lee and X-Factor contestant Chico Slimani.

In 2008, he worked on the British comedy film Snappers, which was shot on location in Torbay. The film also stars Joss Stone, Matt Milburn, Tim Healy, Suranne Jones, Matt Slack and John Bowe, amongst others. It remains unreleased.

Since 2019, Foster has provided the narration for Yesterday's Bangers and Cash, a factual entertainment programme following the Mathewson family-run classic car auction business in Thornton le Dale, North Yorkshire.

== Stand-up ==
In addition to his broadcast work, Foster is also a stand-up comedian, and continues to promote twice weekly shows at the Last Laugh Comedy Club, held on Friday and Saturday evenings at Sheffield City Hall. He was a founder member of the M.E.N.@Work team at Manchester's Comedy Store. He also runs his own company, Don't Shoot Productions Ltd., which runs comedy nights in the north of England.
