= Antonia Brickell =

Communications specialist & VO artist

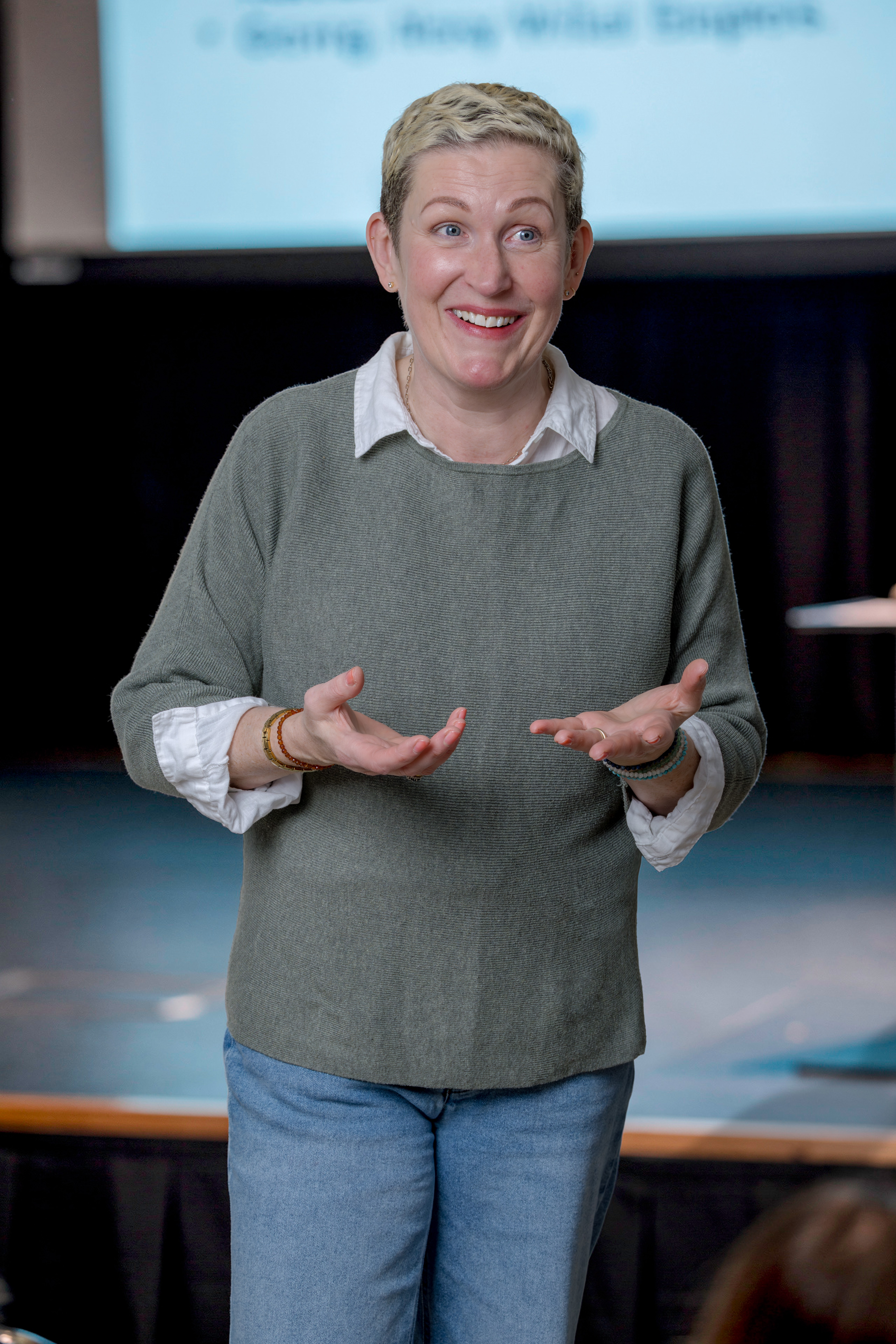

Antonia Brickell is a communications specialist and broadcaster, helping people with presentation skills and voice-overs. With a 17-year career in radio as a British radio personality, she presented (and produced) programmes for the BBC in London, Yorkshire, Northamptonshire, Cambridgeshire, across the East of England and the UK. She started out with GWR commercial radio (now known as Heart radio). With 15 years as a communications specialist and over two decades as a voice-over artist, it’s no surprise that Antonia loves storytelling.

== Career ==
=== Cambridge ===
Originally from London, Antonia began in radio on the breakfast show at Q103 Cambridge in 1996.

=== Northamptonshire ===
In 2000, she joined the BBC as a presenter and reporter on BBC Radio Northampton. She presented shows including early breakfast, afternoons and weekend mid-mornings.

In 2001, Antonia also began working as a voice-over artist and was signed up with agency: Voicebookers.com

=== London and the UK ===
She also presented late nights and over nights on BBC London.

At around this time, Antonia started working with independent production company Unique Facilities as a regular voice-over artist, where she hosted weekly audio shows that were syndicated throughout the UK.

=== Sheffield ===
Antonia settled for a time in South Yorkshire when she was offered a job presenting BBC Radio Sheffield's lunchtime slot from March 10, 2003.

From there she was moved to a breakfast show alongside local comic Toby Foster on 20 September 2004. That show continued for a few months, before the two presenters were given their own slots, which ran back-to-back on the station's weekday schedule. Antonia presented Breakfast and Toby presented Mid-mornings.

=== Cambridgeshire ===
After Radio Sheffield, Antonia moved to BBC Radio Cambridgeshire where she presented Antonia Brickell's Drivetime.

=== East of England ===
At the end of 2010, Antonia left her Drivetime show at BBC Cambridgeshire to work across a number of roles. Alongside mentoring radio presenters for the BBC College of Journalism, she continued with voice-overs, working as a media trainer and as a communications consultant for regional charity Magpas Air Ambulance. During this time, she also regularly stepped in to present the BBC regional radio evening show, across the East of England.

Three years later, Antonia joined Magpas Air Ambulance as their Head of Communications.

In August 2020, she left her role with the charity and moved back to utilising her knowledge, insight and skills with broadcasting, communications, presenting and public speaking, together with her many years of experience as a voice-over artist.

=== Latest news ===
Antonia now runs her own communications business called, Antonia Brickell - Telling your story

Antonia helps people with human-to-human communication. She works with business owners, CEOs, MDs, team leaders and people of influence with Nailing your Narrative and presentation skills (1:1 or in groups); supporting people with speaking in the public arena.

Antonia teaches people how to find the central point of a story and how to tell it effectively, by sharing her personal experiences and the methods she has developed while working in storytelling and navigating a world shaped by hybrid working.

With over two decades of experience, Antonia also offers voice-overs for independent production companies and organisations, looking to bring their brand to life. Antonia can voice anything from audio narration to TV and radio commercials, digital corporate promotions, internal and external corporate videos and radio imaging.
