= Radio Wirral =

British local radio station

Coordinates: 53.41359°N 3.09223°W

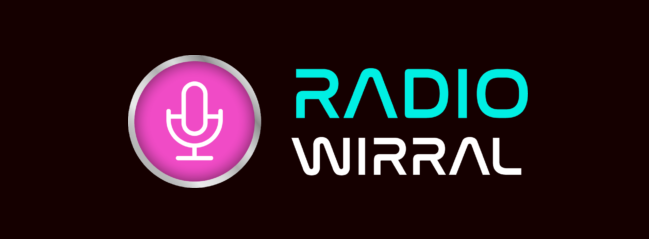
- Final logo (2018–2021)

Leasowe; United Kingdom
- Broadcast area: Wirral Peninsula; North West and North Wales
- Frequency: DAB: 10D

Programming
- Format: CHR/Pop; Hot AC

Ownership
- Owner: Radio Wirral Limited

History
- First air date: 2018 (Online); 2019 (DAB and Online)
- Last air date: 2021

Links
- Webcast: Webcast
- Website: Radio Wirral

Radio Wirral (previously 7 Waves 92.1 and Wirral Radio) was a community radio station serving Liverpool, the Wirral Peninsula, the North West, North Wales and West Cheshire.

== Overview ==
Originally known as 7Waves Community Radio, the station broadcast for 28 days on a Restricted Service Licence on 87.7 FM in 2003 from studios and offices at the Wirral Media Centre in Leasowe. After successfully applying for a community radio licence and funding for building studios, 7 Waves began full-time broadcasting on 92.1 FM on 1 March 2008. The licence was extended for a further five years by OFCOM in November 2012.

7 Waves relaunched as Wirral Radio at 8am on Monday 16 June 2014, coinciding with the station's launch on DAB, broadcasting via the Muxco multiplex for Wrexham, Chester and Liverpool.

On Friday 9 February 2018, the station announced with an hour's notice that it would cease broadcasting, citing financial difficulties. Wirral Radio ended full-time broadcasting at 10am, following its final breakfast show.

Following the announcement, the station continued to broadcast an automated service of continuous music on FM, DAB and online. The only regular programming in its final weeks on air consisted of live commentaries on Tranmere Rovers matches and hourly Sky News Radio bulletins.

A crowdfunding campaign was launched to raise £40,000 to secure the station's future along with an unscheduled 50-hour marathon show. The campaign's target was later revised to £10,000 but failed to raise the amount.

Wirral Radio officially ceased broadcasting on Thursday 1 March 2018. Shortly afterwards, OFCOM confirmed the station handed back its FM licence.

In June 2018 it was announced the station would start broadcasting online later in the year and eventually in 2019 the station started broadcasting on DAB.

== Programming ==
Up until Wirral Radio ceased full-time broadcasting, the station's schedule consisted of music, talk and sports programming, alongside local news coverage and specialist music shows during the evenings and weekends. Apart from hourly bulletins from Sky News Radio, all of Wirral Radio's output was produced and presented locally.

== Wirral Kids ==
Wirral Kids was a charity campaign created by Wirral Radio, supported by the Cheshire Freemasons. The charity aimed to help raise money for local children in crisis.
