= That Peter Kay Thing =

- Created by: Peter Kay
- Written by: Peter Kay; Neil Fitzmaurice; Dave Spikey
- Directed by: Andrew Gillman
- Starring: Peter Kay; Patrick McGuinness; Dave Spikey; Toby Foster; Neil Fitzmaurice; Sian Foulkes; Daniel Kitson; Kristian Tiffany; Kay Kelley; Beatrice Kelley; Steve Edge
- Country of origin: United Kingdom
- Original language: English
- No. of series: 1
- No. of episodes: 7 (inc. pilot)

Production
- Executive producer: Addison Cresswell
- Producers: Ivan Douglass; Sandie Kirk
- Cinematography: Ian Hilton
- Editor: Adrian Conway
- Running time: 30 mins (inc. adverts)

Original release
- Network: Channel 4
- Release: 13 January – 16 February 2000

Related
- Phoenix Nights (2001–2002); Max and Paddy's Road to Nowhere (2004)

That Peter Kay Thing is a British mockumentary series that was first shown on Channel 4 in 2000. It was written by Peter Kay, Dave Spikey, Neil Fitzmaurice and Gareth Hughes, and was directed by Andrew Gillman. The series was narrated by Andrew Sachs, with the exception of the pilot, which was narrated by Kay. Set in and around Bolton, each episode functions as a self-contained documentary following a different set of characters, many of them played by Kay. The pilot episode, "The Services", was shown in 1998 as an episode of Comedy Lab, a series that showcased pilots of experimental comedy shows. Many of the characters went on to appear in the successful spin-off series Phoenix Nights.

== Episode list ==
| No. | Title | Original release date |
|---|---|---|
| Pilot | "The Services" | 9 November 1998 |
Set in a service station just outside Bolton, made for Channel 4's Comedy Lab. The episode charts a day in the life of the unruly station manager, Pearl Hardman, and her employees, including the depressed teenager Matthew Kelly. Panic then ensues when they discover that Bob Carolgees may be stopping at the station.
| 1 | "In the Club" | 12 January 2000 |
Set in The Neptune club, a working men's establishment. It follows the grand final of the annual Talent Trek 99 competition. Characters include the club's social secretary, Brian Potter; the club's compère, Jerry St. Clair; the bouncers, Max and Paddy; and the house band, Les Alanos. The competition is won by Park Avenue, a singing duo comprising Marc Park and Cheryl Avenue, who both feature in the final show of the series, "Lonely at the Top".
| 2 | "Eyes Down" | 19 January 2000 |
Set in the Apollo Bingo Hall, the episode follows a day in the life of the customers and employees, including the idealistic Patrick O'Neil, an ambitious teenage employee that does not like working at the hall; his friends Yvonne and Sparky; the arrogant bingo caller, Tom Dale; the owner, Ron Hibbert, who is afraid of Tom; questionable fire safety officer Keith Lard; and the various old women that inhabit the club.
| 3 | "The Ice Cream Man Cometh" | 26 January 2000 |
The subject of this episode is ice cream man Robert Edge, also known as Mr Softy Top, who sells soft scoop ice cream from his ice cream van. He resents his job, dislikes children, and attempts to boost sales by selling at the sites of road traffic accidents and stocking pornographic videos. To make matters worse, he has to compete with another ice cream man that has started trading in the locality, Signór Whippee. The second half of the episode is set at Leverhulme Park's Bolton Show, at which Softy runs out of ice cream, and, after sending Darren to buy some more, which is melted by the time he gets back, Softy has a mini-breakdown and psychotic episode. This results in the final triumph of Signór Whippee, although he is later exposed as an illegal immigrant. Softy leaves the ice cream business and goes on to open a sex shop called Softy's Hard Stuff, but continues to sell ice cream in the shop, while Darren becomes an ice cream man full time and uses Signór Whippee's van.
| 4 | "The Arena" | 2 February 2000 |
Set in the Manchester Arena, this episode follows the staff and customers preparing for a "Super Sounds of the Seventies" concert. The incompetent Matthew Kelly is employed as a steward, having applied only to see concerts free. He is hassled by Live Sec's Chris and Sean, and is angry when, instead of stewarding the concert, he is left in charge of the car park.
| 5 | "Leonard" | 9 February 2000 |
The episode follows Leonard, a local eccentric, in the run-up to his receiving an award for being Britain's oldest paper boy. Leonard introduces other local eccentrics, including the Duke, who walks around Bolton drawing his fingers from his pockets as if they were guns and shouting "John Wayne!", and Carl, who waves at cars. His aunt claims he was over-protected by his mother, and, as much as he likes to be everybody's friend, he has no real friends of his own. This does not break Leonard's spirit and he remains optimistic throughout.
| 6 | "Lonely at the Top (The Marc Park Story)" | 16 February 2000 |
A documentary following the rise and fall of Marc Park, 12 months after he won Talent Trek at The Neptune. After rising to fame as part of pop group Park Avenue, Park dumped partner Cheryl Avenue when she became pregnant. After two or three hits, he found he was being portrayed as a villain in another documentary focusing on Cheryl's struggles as an unemployed single mother. Eventually Marc returns to his job as a greengrocer and moves in with his brother Frank while Cheryl becomes a star, much to the frustration of Marc.

== Characters ==
- Brian Potter (Kay) – the notoriously selfish social secretary of the working men's club The Neptune. He lost the use of his legs when his former club flooded. It is suggested that he can actually walk, as at the end of the episode he is seen to stand while remonstrating with a group of firefighters.
- Max and Paddy (Kay and Paddy McGuinness) – two inept bouncers at The Neptune.
- Jerry St. Clair (Dave Spikey) – a part-time builder and the compère at The Neptune, and a previous winner of Talent Trek.
- Les Alanos – The Neptune's house band, comprising Les (Toby Foster) and Alan (Steve Edge). Les originally worked with Alan's father before he left to form the tribute band "Right Said Frank'".
- Paul le Roy (Kay) – a local disc jockey for the radio station Chorley FM. He is obsessed with the music of the 1980s. He sports a mullet and has a long-suffering wife.
- Keith Lard (Kay) – an overly zealous local fire safety inspector that, it is alleged, interferes with dogs.
- Patrick O'Neil (Kay) – a cheeky employee at the Apollo Bingo Hall, who, alongside his friends "Sparky" (Alex Lowe) and Yvonne (Sian Gibson), causes havoc in the Apollo.
- Tom Dale (Kay) – a Liverpudlian bingo caller known for his bizarre pre-show preparations and his catchphrase "let's tickle those balls".
- Rose and Theresa (Kay and Beatrice Kelley) – two middle-aged bingo fans that assume anyone that wins is sleeping with Tom Dale.
- Mr Softy Top, aka Robert Edge (Kay) – a third-generation ice cream man that hates children.
- Signór Whippee (Kay) – an ice cream man and Mr Softy Top's rival.
- Darren Bramwell (Kristian Tiffany) – a college student that works for Mr Softy Top on weekends.
- Matthew Kelly (Kay) – an aspiring Irish actor that is unhappily stuck in several part-time jobs.
- Johnny Utah, also known as Craig (Kay) – a surly Wild West obsessive that works as a coach driver.
- Duncan Beach (Daniel Kitson) – a St. John Ambulance volunteer that is devoted to his job, but treated with contempt by those he treats.
- Chris Choi (Neil Fitzmaurice) – one half of the security group Live Sec.
- Shaun Ballen (Kay) – the other half of the security group Live Sec.
- Carol and Edina (Jo Enright and Lynda Thornhill) – two Concertgoers dressed up in fitting attire for the 70s music show.
- Leonard de Tomkinson (Kay) – an elderly, kindly local eccentric. Owing to angina, he is unable to work, but has a paper round and is, therefore, Britain's oldest paperboy.
- Marc Park (Kay) – an aspiring pop star and former greengrocer that looks like Mick Hucknall. He has a dog called Lady.
- Cheryl Avenue (Claire Rhodes) – an aspiring pop star, and former member of Park Avenue, she is the former long suffering partner of Marc Park and mother to his child. She later gained a pop career in her own right while also making her ex look bad much to his chagrin.
- Pearl Hardman (Kay) – a would-be career woman that manages a Bolton service station.
- Alan McClarty (Kay) – an emotionally unstable Scottish mechanic that worked for the RAC before his wife left him and he had a nervous breakdown. He now runs his own breakdown company, "ARC".

== Reception ==
That Peter Kay Thing won the Best New TV Comedy award at the British Comedy Awards.

== Legacy ==
A number of the characters in That Peter Kay Thing, including Brian Potter, Max and Paddy, and Jerry St Clair, went on to become central characters in the highly successful spin-off series Phoenix Nights and Max and Paddy's Road to Nowhere.

== Continuity ==
In episode 1, it was claimed that Brian joined The Neptune as a new member of staff; however, this is inaccurate, as his former club, The Aquarius, as seen in Max and Paddy's Road to Nowhere, still features all The Neptune's staff and committee.
