= Phoenix Nights =

British TV sitcom (2001–2002)

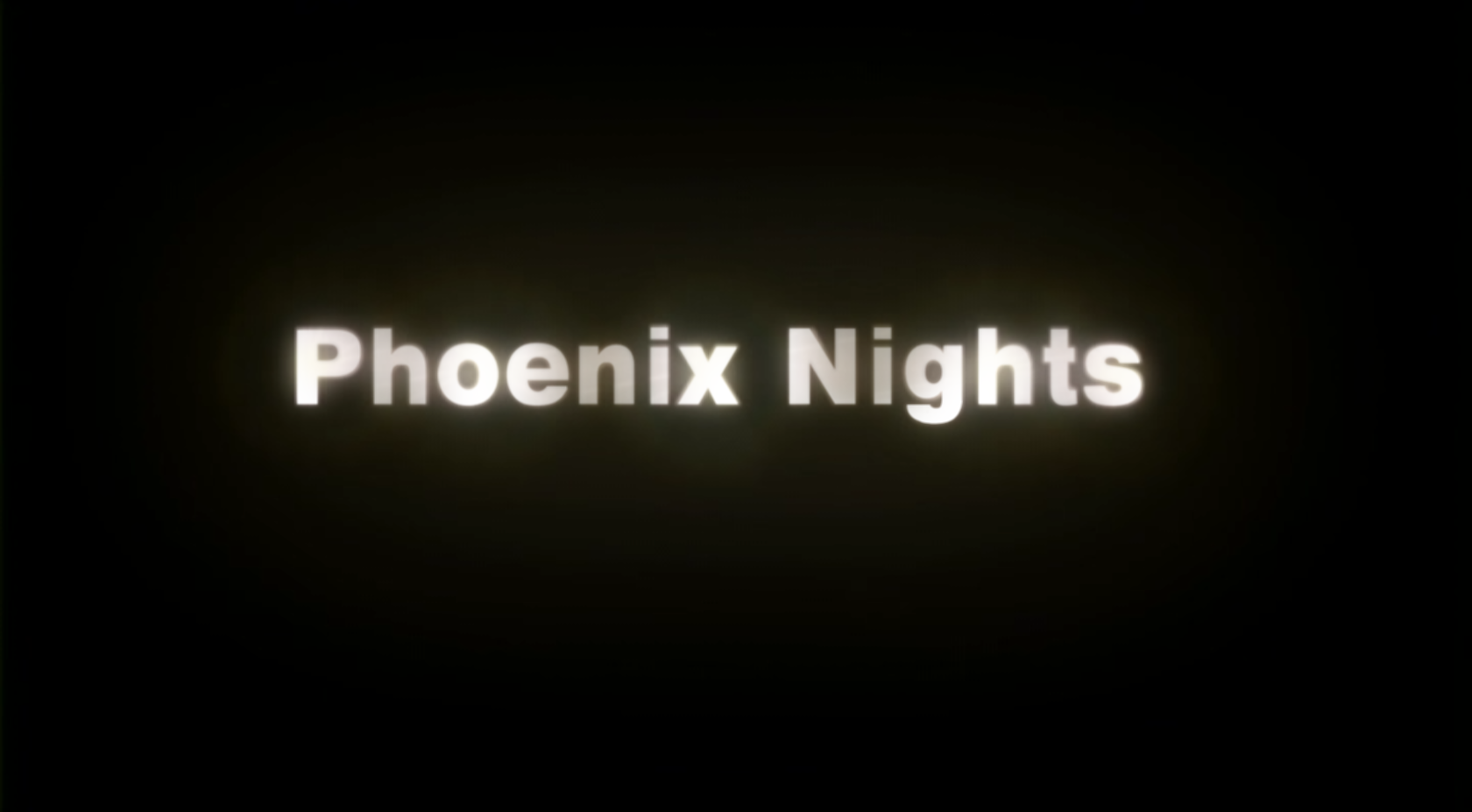
- Opening title
- Genre: Sitcom
- Created by: Peter Kay
- Written by: Peter Kay; Neil Fitzmaurice; Dave Spikey
- Directed by: Jonny Campbell (series 1); Peter Kay (series 2)
- Starring: Peter Kay; Dave Spikey; Patrick McGuinness; Neil Fitzmaurice; Archie Kelly; Steve Edge; Toby Foster; Janice Connolly; Justin Moorhouse; Ted Robbins
- Country of origin: England
- No. of series: 2
- No. of episodes: 12

Production
- Executive producer: Phil McIntyre
- Producers: Mark Herbert; John Rushton; Henry Klejdys
- Cinematography: Andy Hibbert
- Editor: Peter Hallworth
- Running time: 24 minutes
- Production companies: Goodnight Vienna Productions; Ovation Entertainments

Original release
- Network: Channel 4
- Release: 14 January 2001 – 12 September 2002

Related
- That Peter Kay Thing (2000); Max and Paddy's Road to Nowhere (2004)

Peter Kay's Phoenix Nights, sometimes shortened to Phoenix Nights, is a British sitcom about The Phoenix Club, a working men's club in the northern English town of Bolton, Greater Manchester. The show is a spin-off from the "In the Club" episode of the spoof documentary series That Peter Kay Thing, and in turn was followed by the spin-off Max and Paddy's Road to Nowhere. It was produced by Goodnight Vienna Productions and Ovation Entertainments, and broadcast on Channel 4 in the UK.

The show was written by Peter Kay, Neil Fitzmaurice and Dave Spikey. All three writers star in the show, with Kay also directing in the second series. All the music was written by Toni Baker and Peter Kay. Additional material was provided by Paddy McGuinness.

Two series have been produced, which were first broadcast in 2001 and 2002 respectively. The first series transmission dates were brought ahead to January 2001 due to the success of Kay's first home video stand-up release Live at the Top of the Tower, released in November 2000, and That Peter Kay Thing winning Best New TV Comedy at the British Comedy Awards, which meant the series began broadcasting before editing had even been completed on all episodes.

Peter Kay's Phoenix Nights won the People's Choice Award at the British Comedy Awards 2002, and was nominated for several others.

== Characters ==
The owner of The Phoenix Club is wheelchair user Brian Potter (played by Peter Kay), who has presided over two clubs in the past: the first (The Aquarius) flooded, the second (The Neptune) burned down. His ambition, with the help of Jerry St Clair, is to see The Phoenix Club become the most popular in Bolton and thus outdo his nemesis, Den Perry (Ted Robbins), owner of rival club The Banana Grove.

== The Phoenix Club ==
The Phoenix Club is a fictional working men's club in Farnworth near Bolton. The Phoenix Club is home to entertainment of all types, including bingo, singing, cabaret and a wide range of themed nights. The club was opened by Brian Potter and is run by him and his staff.

=== Employees ===
The club has a number of workers:

- Brian Potter: Owner of the club, who goes to any extremes to keep it open.
- Jerry St. Clair: Compere, Cabaret singer and fall guy of the show. He later becomes licensee of the club.
- The Captain: The club's doorman. He dies in series 1, episode 2.
- Ray Von: A former fairground worker and electrician, who is the club's DJ and sound engineer.
- Maxwell "Max" Bygraves and Patrick "Paddy" O'Shea: The club's two bouncers.
- Les and Alan: The two backing players, with drums and keyboard, known as "Les Alanos".
- Kenny Senior: A Jack of all trades at the club and compulsive liar. Claims to have stayed in a tent next to Robert De Niro in Pwllheli and beaten him at Swingball.
- Young Kenny: A young, dim-witted handyman.
- Mary (Holy Mary): Bar worker and strict Catholic.
- Spencer: Ignorant but hard-working barman.
- Ant and Dec: Two illegal Chinese immigrants whom the club accidentally brought into the country. Employed by Brian Potter as chefs.
- Marion: Bar worker, cleaner and chef. She is good friends with Mary and also works as Brian's PA.
- Joyce: Bar worker who replaces Marion in series 2.
- Mary: Holy Mary's daughter and member of the bar staff.
- Jack Kenny: Experienced Gruffalo Handler

=== Layout ===
The club follows the layout of a typical working men's club, with a large cabaret room along with a lounge area (called 'The Pennine Suite' in the opening series). In an attempt to diversify and attract more customers, the lounge is later converted into a successful Chinese restaurant named "The Golden Phoenix". There is also a games room in the club, which was named the "Jocky Wilson Suite" in the first series, and the "Tony Knowles Suite" in the second. In the first series, the room was shown as a home to the games supplied by "Dodgy Eric", such as the wonky snooker table, the bucking bronco and a kiddie ride of the title character from Jimbo and the Jet-Set. In the second series, the games room is used more as lounge and general social area with dining tables, although there is a dartboard and a new snooker table. The solarium is also adjacent, through a door from this room. The Pennine Suite served as a general large lounge and social area in the first series, but was seldom seen in the second series; it contains a small stage used for Wednesday "free and easy" nights. Eventually it was replaced by a Chinese restaurant. The other room in the club is a larger cabaret style room, which plays host to larger features such as Talent Trek and Stars in their Eyes.

== Filming location ==
As well as being set in Bolton, Phoenix Nights is also filmed in the area. The location for the club itself is St Gregory's Social Club on Church Street in Farnworth, a few miles from Bolton.

When Max and Paddy return from France in Series 2, the location used is Fleetwood Docks.

== Story Arc ==
Throughout the two series of Phoenix Nights, a theme of the show is the rivalry between The Phoenix Club and local rival club 'The Banana Grove', run by the flamboyant Den Perry. Brian Potter devises ideas for the club to attract more customers, usually to the disapproval of Jerry "The Saint" St. Clair. As more people come to the club, its popularity exceeds that of its rivals. Despite this, Brian Potter's thrifty ways means he continues to try to cut corners in the running of the club.

The second series follows on from the first. Following the staging of the highly regarded local talent contest 'Talent Trek' a vengeful Den Perry burns the club down. With the authorities taking a dim view of Potter's poor attitude towards fire safety and suspending his licence, he then rebuilds the club on the cheap with Jerry as the licensee. The club bounces back and regains its popularity, with schemes such as placing a fake speed camera outside the club to slow motorists down, and a re-enactment of the club's arson on TV show Crimetime (a parody of Crimewatch) in order to gain free advertising.

Following Potter's hiring of two Chinese immigrants, Jerry decides to open a Chinese restaurant inside the club, which, despite Potter's concerns, becomes an instant hit, driving the Phoenix to success whilst leaving other clubs behind. Infuriated at this, Den Perry decides to burn the club again but unwittingly reveals to the clientele that he burned down the Phoenix Club the first time and he is arrested for arson and the club is victorious.

== Episode guide ==
=== Series 1 ===
Episode 1

It is the opening day of Brian Potter's new club, the Phoenix (two of his previous clubs having burned down while another flooded). With "TV's own Roy Walker" opening the club, Brian wants everything to be perfect. But he has to contend with a power cut that leaves the club in the dark, the theft of the bingo machine, a German-speaking "Das Boot" arcade machine, Max the doorman injuring himself and a racist folk band called "Half A Shilling" (with the lead singer played by Tim Healy). The band are ostensibly singing about Holy Communion Shoes, although journalist Deborah Quinn detects the racist metaphor in the song entitled "Send The Buggers Back". These factors soon ruin everything. The auditioning act at the end of the episode is a pair of spacemen, one on a spinning disc, miming to "Space Oddity" by David Bowie.

Episode 2

The club's doorman, the Captain, dies, possibly as a result of inhaling smoke from new DJ Ray Von's home-made smoke machine. There is further misfortune when two men in overalls walk in off the street and steal the television set, with the staff doing nothing about it, except for Kenny Senior who kindly hands them the remote control. A warped snooker table is replaced by a bucking bronco, which leads to a Wild West Night being held. It's a huge success, until Jerry's blatantly biased shoot-out between teams from Lancashire and Yorkshire gets violent and a drunken horse tries to have sex with the bucking bronco. The auditioning act at the end of the episode is an escape artist, trapped in a bag.

Episode 3

Jerry St. Clair has booked psychic medium Clinton Baptiste (Alex Lowe) for the club, following a recommendation by Den Perry. Jerry seems oblivious to the fact that Den Perry wants the Phoenix Club to fail. Brian and Jerry then have to attend a fire safety seminar at the Banana Grove Club presented by Keith Lard (from That Peter Kay Thing), who was arrested for "interfering" with dogs, but was acquitted due to lack of evidence. After the meeting, Lard tells Brian he will be inspecting the club immediately to ensure it meets safety standards. Jerry and Brian rush back to the club before Keith inspects it, but a run-in with the police delays them and Keith shuts the club down for being unsafe. Never a quitter, Brian blackmails Lard with a faked photo of Lard's head on the body of a semi-nude man (with a dog) so that he re-opens the club. However, the event they re-open for, the psychic night, forces Brian to refund all his guests after Clinton Baptiste tells a bit more about the future than the guests would like. The auditioning act at the end of the episode is a bad juggler, breaking his props.

Episode 4

It's 'Singles Night' at the Phoenix club and house band Les Alanos and bouncers Max and Paddy are all looking. Brian is the most successful, though, when he accidentally runs over a woman's foot before buying her a drink and talking the night away. Throughout the episode, their relationship progresses, until Beverley (played by Jo Enright) reveals to Brian that she works for the DSS and was sent to investigate him for fraudulent disability claims. Despite Beverley's assertions that her feelings for him are genuine, Brian ends the relationship. Elsewhere, Paddy strikes up a relationship with Holy Mary's daughter Mary. The audition at the end of the episode is a man jumping around to Nellie the Elephant wearing little more than a mackintosh and an elephant soft toy's trunk over his genitals.

Episode 5

Jerry is in hospital. Before Brian argues with Jerry's decision to host an alternative comedy night, the comedy night turns out to be a disaster, with none of the entrants being any good. As one of the acts, Steve Davies plays a placid metalwork teacher introduced as 'Darius' by Jerry. Darius comes on wearing only a pair of C&A underpants with 'Darius' written in ink on his body. He proceeds to have a psychotic episode, with unintelligible language delivered menacingly towards the audience and the house band onstage whilst striking the drummer's cymbal with his hand. He is crying out to the universe to complete his breakdown. At the end of it all, Jerry has a heated confrontation with a student who had been heckling him, until the student threatens to hit Jerry and all the staff stick up for him. Elsewhere, Ray Von hosts a Robot Wars tournament, which is won by Max and Paddy, who are using a robot built by Ray, who has a penchant for electronics. At the end of the episode, a man called Dougie Hayes offers Jerry a job on a cruise ship. The auditioning act at the end of the episode are a pair of elderly Spanish dancers.

Episode 6

Jerry gets an all-clear from hospital. However, Brian tells him to keep pretending to be ill because the club got the rights to host Talent Trek because he told the organisers that Jerry is dying. Tensions boil when Brian has to hire a Right Said Fred tribute band called 'Right Said Frank' for the grand finale due to Les Alanos performing a Karate Kid musical with the local youth club on the same night. Right Said Frank end up stealing stereos from all the cars parked outside. Ray Von tries to stop them but he is overpowered. Luckily, they slam into Max's car, setting off his personal alarm. Max and Paddy rush outside and tackle the two men to the ground. Brian then 'reveals' to the audience that Jerry has got an all-clear for his illness. Despite everything, Jerry can't bring himself to leave the club and turns down the cruise ship job offer. The series concludes with Den Perry, outraged at the success of the Phoenix Club, setting it on fire.

=== Series 2 ===
Episode 1

Brian and the staff watch the club burn to the ground, with Jerry managing to rescue Brian's little disabled boy-shaped charity box. After the flames are put out, a firefighter reveals the fire was caused by a discarded cigarette or cigar, leading Brian to believe Den Perry was responsible. Brian then has to appear in court due to his negligence towards fire and safety equipment and forging of insurance documents. As a result, his alcohol licence is permanently revoked and he is blacklisted by the breweries. Despite all this, Brian dreams of rebuilding the Phoenix Club. On his trip to Asda he finds Jerry and Alan singing parodies of famous songs to promote products. Brian begs Jerry to help him to rebuild the Phoenix but Jerry rebuffs him and tells him to forget about the Phoenix and move on. Still undeterred, Brian travels to Blackpool to visit an old friend, Frank Cartwright (played by Jim Bowen), owner of the Hotel "Le Ponderosa: Sunshine Indoors". Cartwright advises him to sell bottles and cans to get around the ban, get a licensee whom he can manipulate and have multiple facilities under one roof. Brian then phones around to find all the staff. He finds Les working as a butcher, Kenny Senior as a lollipop man (constantly lying to the kids crossing the road), Ray Von DJing at a fairground, and Holy Mary in church. In what was to become an iconic moment for the series, he calls Max and Paddy as they are driving elderly Asian gentlemen to a mosque and singing at the tops of their voices to Dennis Waterman's "I Could Be so Good For You" and Tony Christie's classic hit "Is This The Way To Amarillo?". Brian succeeds in bringing all of them together to discuss his plans, and convinces Jerry to become the new licensee. The auditioning act at the end of the episode is a magician whose pigeon gets caught in a rotating fan.

Episode 2

Reconstruction is going quite well, and a fun day is organised to raise awareness of the rebuilding. However, an inflatable that resembles an erect penis is rejected by Brian, so it is fastened to the ground and covered up to look like a snake. Unfortunately, the inflatable escapes from its cover and explodes, shocking everyone who is spending their money. Furthermore, a botched face-painting job leaves Young Kenny with a permanent tiger face. Elsewhere, Max and Paddy go to France to stock up on booze, unwittingly picking up two Chinese immigrants in the process. The auditioning act at the end of the episode is a young woman who fires ping pong balls from her vagina.

Episode 3

Brian decides to get the club on Crimetime for publicity and a chance to accuse Den Perry. Changes are made throughout the club to make it look good for the TV crew, but the TV appearance is a disaster when Brian loses it after he believes that he is being accused of burning the club down himself. Elsewhere, Spencer is hired for the vacant bar job. The auditioning act at the end of the episode is a one-legged Elvis impersonator.

Episode 4

Brian comes across two Japanese people promoting their new lager, and offers them a chance to promote it in the club, an offer they accept. A pub quiz is arranged, with the winner taking home a year's supply of the lager. Both Brian and Den Perry enter teams to try and win it. Brian's team wins, but his victory is short-lived when it turns out the lager is non-alcoholic. In the other suite, Jerry's medication binge gets the better of him and he loses it on stage, which causes him to go into the next suite and urinate everywhere, shocking the customers. The auditioning act at the end of the episode is a man with a battery-powered singing teddy bear.

Episode 5

A power cut in Brian's home sees him stuck on his stair lift all night until Jerry breaks his door down the next morning. At the club, Jerry has turned part of the club into a Chinese restaurant called "The Golden Phoenix". A ladies night has been arranged, which causes Paddy to go on stage dressed in nothing but a fake moustache and leather thong, and carrying a trident. Outside, Max is accosted by a woman who wants her husband killed. Max tells her that he will kill her husband for £8,000. Lying to Paddy that she will pay them both £1,000, Max gets Paddy to agree to do the job with him. Max, Paddy and Max's brother Terry go to practise shooting using a Broomhandled Mauser which Max's grandad gave him. When Paddy starts to fire, he accidentally shoots Terry. Eventually, Max and Paddy can't kill the man and give him £3,000 to leave the country. Max gives Paddy £1,000, and spends £4,000 on a motor home. The auditioning act at the end of the episode is the same man as in S2E4, this time with a battery-powered singing gorilla.

Episode 6

Max and Paddy spot the man they were meant to kill in town, and are later confronted by his angry wife, who hints that she has put a hit out on them. She also reveals to Paddy that she paid Max £8,000, of which Paddy only received £1,000. In the club, Brian has arranged a Stars in Your Eyes night to impress a brewery representative who is coming over. Unfortunately, Den Perry has other ideas and cancels the acts by impersonating Jerry. However, in a memorable series of scenes, all of the staff from the club dress up to become acts, including Holy Mary as Lulu, Ray Von and Les Alanos as Adam and the Ants, Kenny Senior as Britney Spears, Young Kenny as Meat Loaf, Jerry as Eminem and George Michael, Brian as Elton John and Spencer as Gary Glitter. At the end of the episode, Den Perry threatens Brian and talks to him about burning the club down before and makes threats to do it again. However, he is unaware that Brian has switched on a radio microphone on his desk, meaning that the entire club has heard the conversation. Den Perry is arrested and the staff celebrate. Ray Von then reminds Brian that now the truth has come out, he can get his licence back. However, Brian decides to let Jerry remain as licensee and the staff hold a toast to Jerry. At the end of the episode, Max, terrified that there is a hit out on him, is about to flee all over the country in his motor home, when Paddy decides to come with him, and setting the scene for the spin-off series Max and Paddy's Road to Nowhere.

== Keith Laird controversy ==
A complaint was filed about the show in 2001 by Keith Laird, a fire safety officer working for Bolton Council. He claimed that the character Keith Lard in series 1 episode 3 was based on him. Channel 4 paid Laird compensation and issued an apology for any confusion and Kay maintained that Lard was fictional:

Channel 4 and Peter Kay would like to state that the character of Keith Lard may have led some persons to wrongly believe that the character was based on a Mr Keith Laird. We wish to make it clear that this was not the case and would like to apologise to Mr Laird and his family for the distress caused.

== Broadcasts ==
- Series 1: six episodes, broadcast 14 January 2001 to 18 February 2001
- Series 2: six episodes, broadcast 8 August 2002 to 12 September 2002

Phoenix Nights is rarely repeated on British television. During an interview with Danny Baker for Peter Kay In Conversation, Kay stated he resents allowing his shows, including Phoenix Nights, to be repeated as it "dilutes the quality" of the programme, citing Only Fools and Horses as an example of a highly regarded programme "ruined" by excessive repeat showings.

Kay also revealed in November 2025 that he had rejected an offer from Netflix to have the show on the service as he "didn't want a trigger warning".

== Potential third series and film ==
In September 2006, Kay revealed on BBC Radio 1 that a third series of Phoenix Nights has been written, but it is unknown when the series will be filmed. On 8 May 2007, another announcement by Kay was made promising another series will be made. However Dave Spikey, in interviews with The Sentinel and the Croydon Guardian in late 2009, claimed that neither he nor fellow co-writer Neil Fitzmaurice were aware of any plans to bring back the series. In a recent interview with Peter Kay he stated that he had written a third series of Phoenix Nights and had even written a screenplay for it. However, when asked if he would be going back there he said that he would prefer to do something new next. Kay also claims he's been approached to make a Phoenix Nights movie following the success of The Inbetweeners Movie. In August 2014, it was reported that Kay was in talks to revive Phoenix Nights in the form of a series of live shows for Comic Relief in 2015. In November 2014, Kay announced during a charity fundraising event at the Opera House Theatre, Blackpool, that an official announcement would be made regarding the revival of the show. Kay confirmed again in April 2017 that a third series had been written but that "things kept getting in the way" of filming it.

In November 2025, Kay told Capital FM: "I have written a film of Phoenix Nights. It's written and it's done. But I'm waiting for the de-aging process to come into fruition. Because the storyline involves a lot of flashbacks to the past and I don’t want to be using really bad makeup to make people look young. Seriously, when the tour is finished, I've been thinking about it. I've been looking at the capabilities of de-aging technology."

== Cultural references ==
In 2026, the death metal band Ovulating Cadaver released the single Inflatable Filth, referencing the penis and testicles inflatable from Series 2, Episode 2, quoting lines from the episode and depicting a violent version of the inflatable on the single cover.
