= Max and Paddy's Road to Nowhere =

2004 British TV sitcom

- Genre: Sitcom; Action-adventure
- Created by: Peter Kay
- Written by: Peter Kay; Patrick McGuinness
- Directed by: Peter Kay
- Starring: Peter Kay; Patrick McGuinness
- Country of origin: United Kingdom
- No. of series: 1
- No. of episodes: 6

Production
- Executive producer: Phil McIntyre
- Producer: Lesley McNeil
- Cinematography: Martin Hawkins; Andy Hibbert
- Editor: Peter Hallworth
- Running time: 30 minutes (inc. adverts)

Original release
- Network: Channel 4
- Release: 12 November – 17 December 2004

Related
- Phoenix Nights

Max and Paddy's Road to Nowhere is a British sitcom starring and written by Peter Kay and Paddy McGuinness. It was broadcast on Channel 4 and began on 12 November 2004, running for six 30-minute episodes up until 17 December 2004. A spin-off from Peter Kay's Phoenix Nights, the series follows the two Bolton doormen/bouncers Maxwell "Max" Bygraves (Kay) and Patrick "Paddy" O'Shea (McGuinness) as they tour around the UK in their campervan. They are fugitives due to an incident in the last episodes of Phoenix Nights, in which a club patron threatened to have them killed by hitmen.

== Background ==
Although the series was broadcast two years after Peter Kay's Phoenix Nights, the plot is set immediately after the events of the previous series. Max is the older and more level-headed of the two, roughly 40 years old, and usually pretending to have more life experience than he has actually had, including a stint in the army. Paddy is an idealistic wide boy obsessed with sex, pornography and food. Max often oppressively stares at Paddy or anyone who has offended his tastes and often shouts "H-how dare you!". He also calls people a clown or a melon if they've said something absurd.

The motor home originally purchased by Max in Phoenix Nights was a Ford; however, the motor home they use in Max and Paddy's Road to Nowhere is a Fiat. Peter Kay touched on this in the DVD commentary of Phoenix Nights, saying that he should have told the production company to buy a larger motor home than the Ford as he intended to use it in the spin-off.

== Theme song ==
The theme song was written by Toni Baker and Peter Kay and borrowed heavily from the theme to the 1970s American series B. J. and the Bear. The lyrics are "Don't know where we're going, Got no way of knowing, Driving on the Road to Nowhere. Sponging for a living, Checkin' out the women, Riding on the Road to Nowhere... And we don't take shit from anyone, The only thing we wanna do is have some fun. We're Max and Paddy (Paddy and Max!), And best of all, we don't pay Council Tax!". Singer Tony Christie was to sing the show's theme, but his version was only used once, at the very end of the final episode. Kay and McGuinness themselves sang it in the opening sequences of episodes 2 to 6. Episode 1's opening theme is instrumental and episodes 2 - 5's closing themes are too.

== Episodes ==
=== Episode 1 ===
In Dover, Max and Paddy buy a plasma television from an Irish crook called Gypsy Joe (played by Brendan O'Carroll). This leads to several arguments, especially when they realise the television doesn't have any speakers. The pair thus decide to go out to a nightclub to cheer themselves up and relax, but Max's uncoordinated dancing spoils the night and he ends up fighting with some sailors home on shore leave. Paddy teaches him a few cool moves the following day, and they return to the club dressed as sailors in order to blend in. Their new moves lure two local girls, Tracey and Louise, back to the campervan, only for one of them to steal Paddy's wallet. After discovering the girls, locally known as the 'Belgrano Sisters', are infamous for this, they get revenge by forcing them to steal some speakers for their television.

This episode had 4.2m viewers.

=== Episode 2 ===
After a humiliating cameo in the porn parody "Willy Wanker and the Chocolate Factory", Paddy's day worsens when the campervan breaks down in the Midlands. The vehicle is left with local mechanic Mick Bustin (Noddy Holder) while Max and Paddy take the last train of the day to Middlewood. Stranded with no return journey, they attempt to hike back but got lost in the woods. As night falls, Max reveals a notebook filled with childlike sketches for his imaginary TV show, Magnet and Steel. Paddy mocks him and, in frustration, burns the book on their campfire, causing a row. Max later forgives him and opens up—via flashback—about his one true love, a midget named Tina, whom he met in 1994. Their romance ended abruptly after she overheard his friends making cruel jokes about her height, leaving before witnessing Max defend her by headbutting one of them.

The next morning, Max and Paddy discover they were only a short walk from a petrol station and a Travelodge all along. Their frustration grows when Mick Bustin demands £500 for repairs, prompting them to break into his garage. In a parody of The A-Team, they modify the campervan and make a dramatic escape—only for it to break down again, as Bustin had never actually fixed it. This episode features several familiar faces from Phoenix Nights and includes a nod to Midnight Cowboy. It also reveals Paddy's full name, Patrick O'Shea—a joke referencing the regular teasing of Irish footballer John O'Shea for resembling Paddy McGuinness. This episode drew 8m viewers.

=== Episode 3 ===
Max and Paddy arrive in London and clash with the traffic police. Soon after, Max notices a message in a local newspaper celebrating the 40th birthday of his old school friend Kevin "The Wolfster" Wolfson, who had moved to London years earlier. The pair crash the party, surprising The Wolfster along with several familiar faces from back home. Among the guests is Tina (played by Lisa Hammond), Max's true love, mentioned in the previous episode. Max tries to reconcile with her and finds out that she is married to The Wolfster and has a child with him, a 10-year-old boy named Daniel, who turns out to be Max's biological son; Tina urges Max to stay away and keep the truth hidden. The next morning, Max confides in Paddy, and they hatch a plan to take Daniel but steal the wrong school bus, thinking Daniel is aboard. The mix-up leads to their arrest by the police and they are sent to prison. The episode features comic actor Reece Shearsmith as one of Max's old friends. Notable moments include a "Row, Row, Row Your Boat" sequence on the bus—an homage to Dirty Harry—and a scene where The Wolfster gives Max his number on a Peter Kay beermat, a nod to Kay's John Smith's Brewery adverts. The episode had an audience of 3.01 million viewers.

=== Episode 4 ===
Following the school bus siege, Max and Paddy are in prison. Paddy is assigned to a cell with a Cliff Richard impersonator who appears to believe he is the singer. After a difficult first night, Paddy confesses his anxiety about assaults in the communal showers. To allay his fears, Max devises a strategy: they will convince the other inmates that they are not inept nightclub doormen, but notorious gangsters known as The Phoenix Twins.

Their fabricated reputation is soon tested when Paddy quarrels with a fellow inmate, Pepe, which draws the attention of the wing's crimelord, Raymond "The Bastard" (Everal Walsh) who also happens to be Pepe's partner. Raymond, intrigued by rumours of the pair's supposed criminal exploits, demands a share of their alleged fortunes. To avoid conflict and secure privileges such as luxury chocolates and Sky+, Max agrees.

Unexpectedly, their former employer Brian Potter (Peter Kay) visits them in prison, bringing a cake and announcing his intention to launch a public campaign to secure their release. Concerned that such publicity will undermine their imposture, Max and Paddy reject his offer. Potter disregards their warnings and later appears on the news, inadvertently exposing their deception to the rest of the prison population.

As tensions rise and confrontation with Raymond and his associates appears inevitable, Max and Paddy are abruptly summoned by a prison officer. It is revealed that Tina, Max's former partner, has confessed to the authorities that Daniel is Max's son and that Max's actions during the bus incident were the result of emotional distress. their sentences are reduced to community service and they are released. In retaliation against Potter, they anonymously report a fictitious anthrax outbreak at his club. The episode also reveals Max's full name — Maxwell Bygraves — a nod to veteran British entertainer Max Bygraves. It attracted an audience of 3.16 million viewers.

=== Episode 5 ===
While travelling through the West Country, Paddy accidentally runs over and kills a cow that has wandered into the road. Seeking compensation for the damage to their van, he and Max trace the animal to a nearby farm. Believing they have found the farmer, they instead encounter a dishevelled, mentally unstable old man in a field. Rather than offering them reimbursement, he persuades the pair to purchase a breeder pig for £100, assuring them it could fetch around £300 at market.

However, when Max and Paddy arrive at the cattle market, they quickly discover the pig is in poor health and that they have been deceived. Their subsequent attempts to sell the animal—to local butchers, a supermarket, and even a Halal outlet—prove futile. In desperation, they consider slaughtering the pig themselves, but ultimately abandon the plan and return to the farm in hopes of reclaiming their money.

It is then revealed that the man who sold them the pig was in fact the alcoholic father-in-law of the actual farmer, and that their money has almost certainly been spent at the local pub. To make matters worse, the farmer is furious to learn that Max and Paddy were responsible for the death of one of his cows.

This episode guest stars Graham Walker of The Grumbleweeds and attracted an audience of 3.43 million viewers.

=== Episode 6 ===
Max and Paddy drive into North East England to visit Max's old doorman friend Billy 'The Butcher' Shannon, who had previously briefly appeared in the 1994 flashback in Episode 2. They agree to let Shannon, who is looking for his estranged son, hitch a ride around. They soon discover though that he's obsessed with Max ("Not in a gay way" he claims), and detests Paddy because Paddy took Billy's job when Billy went to prison. What they fail to notice at the same time is that Shannon is carrying a revolver, which he uses to force a Little Chef employee called Brenda (played by Alex Hall) to open for the trio late at night. The police are quickly on to the gang, with only Shannon aware of any crime. When the campervan stops off later down the road, Max sees a newspaper headline and realises what's happening. Furthermore, Billy catches Paddy going through his stuff and prepares to shoot him.

A chase eventually ensues through the services and along a motorway tunnel bridge, and Shannon shoots Paddy in the bottom. As he's about to shoot Max, Paddy has a second wind, and whacks Shannon around the head with a traffic cone, using Peter Kay's TV catchphrase of "'Ave It!" in the process. With Shannon now unconscious and arrested, Max and Paddy slip away from a police lecture - due to the fact that earlier in the episode they cut down a speed camera - and drive-off into the night. This episode had 3.26 million viewers.

== Future ==
A second series of the show was initially planned for 2006, but Peter Kay instead confirmed a third series of Phoenix Nights (which as of 2026 has not materialised). On 22 February 2010, Peter Kay stated to The Sun that he and Paddy McGuinness planned to do more specials of Max and Paddy's Road To Nowhere. He wanted Phil 'The Pastie' Murphy to play the portly soldier in love with Max's mother. He had also stated in 2010, during an appearance on The Chris Moyles Show, that he wanted Sir Terry Wogan to play an Irish baddie when Max and Paddy go to a funeral in Ireland but, after a stag night, only have fancy dress magician clothes. Mayhem would then ensue as they tried to act appropriately in the situation, only to keep unintentionally doing magic tricks based on what they found in their outfits. On 27 November 2014 live shows were announced for Comic Relief, with the full cast returning.

== Max & Paddy's The Power of Two ==
A spoof fitness DVD was released, Max & Paddy's The Power of Two, including several gags and pieces of scenery from the main series. The DVD also included extra workout tips and a segment instructed by Brian Potter live from the Phoenix Club. On the DVD packaging, it is now referred to as "The UK's fastest selling fitness DVD – Ever!" Although the main workout is shown in full, it is more intended as a spoof product than a genuine workout.

== DVD audio commentary ==
Kay and McGuinness do not provide the DVD audio commentary.

- Episode one: Colin Murray and Edith Bowman
- Episode two: Bez and Shaun Ryder
- Episode three: Vernon Kay and Tess Daly
- Episode four: Vernon Kay and Tess Daly
- Episode five: Keith Harris and Orville the Duck
- Episode six: Stuart Hall and Stuart Maconie

== See also ==
- Phoenix Nights
- Peter Kay's Britain's Got the Pop Factor... and Possibly a New Celebrity Jesus Christ Soapstar Superstar Strictly on Ice
