= Moray Hunter =

Scottish comedian, writer and performer (born 1957)

- Born: 1957 (age 68–69)
- Years active: 1986-Present

Moray Hunter (born October 1957) is a Scottish comedian, writer and performer. He starred in the Channel 4 sketch show, Absolutely. Alongside Jack Docherty, he played one half of the eccentric double-act, Don and George, in Absolutely and later in the spin-off series, Mr Don & Mr George. He also provided the voice for a shadow puppet in one of Aardman Animations' short films, Humdrum. He has written, produced and appeared in a variety of radio and television productions.

== Early life ==
Moray Hunter was born in October 1957. He was educated at George Watson's College in Edinburgh. He studied law at the University of Dundee then practised in Bathgate, West Lothian in Scotland.

== Comedy career ==
=== The Bodgers ===
Hunter began writing and performing with Jack Docherty as The Bodgers at the 1980 Edinburgh Fringe, along with Peter Baikie and Gordon Kennedy. In 1984 the troupe were runners up for the Perrier Pick of the Fringe with their show The Bodgers: Arfington Arfington and in December they performed their act in the Tron Theatre in Glasgow. A radio series of four episodes was aired on BBC Radio 4 in 1985. Their 1985 Fringe performance The Bodgers: Mr Hargreaves did it earned them a second Perrier Award nomination.

By December 1985, ITV had been announced that he would be appearing as part of a four person comedy segment on the Hogmanay television programme. In September 1987, ITV's Terry Nesson show was showing some Scottish acts not seen on television before, alongside some more established acts. The showed was billed as having regular contributions from a couple of comedy acts, including Hunter and Docherty, at that time performing as Don and George.

=== Sketch writing for established shows ===
Hunter got work writing for Chris Tarrant's Saturday Stayback show made by Central Television which aired in 1983. He worked as a writer on Spitting Image series 1 and 2 which aired on the ITV network 1984-1985, and series 4-7 which aired 1986-1988. He was a writer for Alas Smith and Jones series 2-4 which aired 1985–1987 on BBC 2. The Lenny Henry Show, He had writing credits on 16 episodes of Radio Active spanning series 3–5 which ran 1983-1985. He wrote material for episodes in the third series of the Radio Four comedy In One Ear in 1985.

=== Absolutely ===
Hunter and Docherty formed the media production company Absolutely Productions in 1988. Hunter, Docherty, Baikie and Kennedy were joined by Morwenna Banks and John Sparkes to make the sketch show Absolutely which broadcast on Channel 4 over four seasons from 1989 to 1993. Hunter and Docherty wrote and starred in Mr Don and Mr George, a series based on two characters from the show that first aired on Channel 4 in 1993 and had six episodes.

Hunter and Docherty were the voices of the two main characters in Humdrum, an animated comedy short film produced by Aardman Animations and released in 1998. The film received an Academy Award nomination for Best Animated Short Film and a BAFTA nomination in the same category. He had writing credits on the animated television series Meg and Mog which was adapted from books and first aired on CITV 2003–2004.

Hunter and Docherty wrote a sitcom based in an advertising agency, The Creatives, which had two series that aired on BBC 2 1998-2000. Hunter, Docherty and Kennedy all starred in the radio sitcom series Very Old Pretenders on BBC Radio Four in 2011.

=== Absolutely revival ===
Twenty years after Absolutely had first been on television, the team prepared for a one-off live show for Radio 4's Sketchorama in Òran Mór, Glasgow to be produced by The Comedy Unit. Docherty did not take part, citing prior work commitments. The group enjoyed their comeback and the programme won Best Scripted Comedy with Audience in the 2014 Audio Drama Awards. Three radio series of Absolutely followed 2015–2019.

In December 2006, The Clan was to be broadcast by BBC Radio Scotland as a pilot. It was a comedy radio play that he wrote, commissioned by BBC Scotland and produced by Tern TV.

Hunter and Docherty wrote the mockumentary series The Cup. After securing the rights, they adapted a Canadian series The Tournament which centred around a minor ice hockey. The result was a six-part series based around an ambitious under-elevens football team, which aired on BBC2 in 2008. Together with Gordon Kennedy, he produced two series of Secrets and Lattes a sitcom set in a middle-class Bruntsfield café which first was on BBC Radio Four in 2008.

He was a writer on Sorry, I've Got No Head, a children’s sketch show that aired on CBBC in 2009. He was writer and producer of Freedom a comedy programme that first aired on BBC Two Scotland in December 2010.

His radio comedy Alone had four series on BBC Radio 4 between 2018 and 2022. It was shortlisted for Best Scripted Comedy at the 2021 BBC Audio Drama Awards.

He has appeared in episodes of various comedy programmes: Rab C Nesbitt,Bob Servant, Badults, Still Game, and Gary: Tank Commander.

== Drama ==
In 1998 Hunter appeared in John Byrne's version of the satirical play The Government Inspector at London's Almeida Theatre and then at Edinburgh King's Theatre.

He appeared in the 2006 film The Flying Scotsman, a drama based on the life and career of Scottish amateur cyclist Graeme Obree.

He appeared in the BBC's forensic crime drama Silent Witness playing a depressed vet with a faulty hearing aid.
