= Jack Docherty =

Scottish writer, actor, presenter and producer (born 1962)

- Born: John Docherty; 1962 (age 63–64); Edinburgh, Scotland
- Occupations: Writer, actor, presenter, producer

John Docherty (born 1962, also known as Jack Docherty) is a Scottish writer, actor, presenter and producer.

== Career ==
Docherty first performed at the 1980 Edinburgh Festival Fringe with the comedy sketch group The Bodgers which he formed with George Watson's College schoolfriends Moray Hunter, Gordon Kennedy and Pete Baikie. They performed each year from 1980 to 1985. Arfington, Arfington their 1984 show and Mr Hargreaves Did It their 1985 show were both shortlisted for the Perrier Comedy Award. In 1982 he dropped out of Aberdeen University where he was studying law, after he and Moray Hunter became staff writers in the BBC radio comedy department contributing to various shows including Radio Active, In One Ear, Week Ending and The News Huddlines. He also recorded one series with The Bodgers for Radio 4 called In Other Words...The Bodgers. For the second series, producer Alan Nixon teamed them with John Sparkes and Morwenna Banks for Bodgers, Banks and Sparkes, forming the cast that would go on to make the sketch show Absolutely for Channel 4.

In addition to his radio work, he wrote for Spitting Image for four series between 1984 and 1987. During the same period he also contributed to various other comedy shows including Alas Smith and Jones, and The Lenny Henry Show. He was also script editor for the first series of Vic Reeves Big Night Out. He wrote four series of Absolutely (1989–1992) and with Hunter the spin-off Channel 4 sitcom Mr Don & Mr George (1993). With Morwenna Banks he co-wrote the C4 Comedy Lab "Model, Actress, Whatever..." directed by Rankin and, again with Moray Hunter, two series of the BBC2 sitcom The Creatives. In 2008 he and Hunter wrote the BBC2 series The Cup starring Steve Edge. This was an adaptation of the Canadian sitcom The Tournament. In 2012 he wrote and acted in "Stop / Start", a pilot for BBC Radio 4. This was then commissioned for a 6-part series which was broadcast on Radio 4 from 6 September 2013 with the title Start/Stop and ran for three series. It was made available as an audio download in October 2019 with the title changed to It's Not Us, It's Them, although the reason for the change is unknown. A TV pilot of the show was broadcast under the name Stop/Start in March 2016 as part of the BBC's Comedy Playhouse series.

As an actor Docherty is best known for his work on the Channel 4 cult comedy sketch show Absolutely. Premiered in 1989 the show marked a shift away from the political satirical orthodoxy of the 1980s to the surreal, character based comedy of the 1990s. The recurring characters he portrayed included MacGlashan, George MacDiarmid, Peter Wells, Mr Nice and one of the Stoneybridge councillors. The sketch featuring the Stoneybridge council bidding for the Olympics was voted the 30th best of all time in The Top 50 Comedy Sketches on Channel 4. He also starred with Moray Hunter in the Absolutely spin off sitcom Mr Don & Mr George. He played the role of Ben Gray in two series of the advertising sitcom The Creatives (1998 and 2000) on BBC2. Also in 2000 he co-starred with Mark Williams in The Strangerers, the Rob Grant penned sci-fi series for Sky One, and provided one of the voices for the Aardman Oscar nominated short Humdrum. In 2013 he appeared regularly in the BBC3 sitcom Badults.

In 1997 he was part of the launch of Channel 5 becoming Britain's first five nights a week chat show host on The Jack Docherty Show. The show also featured some of the first television work of writers Kevin Cecil and Andy Riley, Jesse Armstrong and Sam Bain, and writer/performers David Mitchell and Robert Webb. Not The Jack Docherty Show, broadcast when Docherty was on holiday, featured guest hosts including Phill Jupitus, Rich Hall, Melinda Messenger and, most notably, Graham Norton, who was signed by Channel 4 after his stint to host So Graham Norton. Docherty quit the show in 1999 and Channel 5 did not replace him, ending their production of late night chat shows. In 2000, he hosted the BAFTA film awards in London. Notoriously, he began the night by revealing the twist ending to The Sixth Sense, a move that did not go down well with the audience. In 2000 to 2001 he hosted the Radio 2 show Saturday Night Jack which reunited him with his Absolutely colleague Pete Baikie. He was also an occasional host of Radio 2's Friday night arts show.

He plays Chief Commissioner Cameron Miekelson in BBC Scotland's comedy Scot Squad.

His work as a producer includes the BBC Scotland film No Holds Bard (2008), and two series (2009 and 2010) of the BBC1 sitcom The Old Guys.

== Absolutely Productions ==
Docherty was a co-founder of Absolutely Productions. The company was formed in 1989 to produce the eponymous sketch show for Channel 4 and has since gone on to produce various comedy shows including Mr Don & Mr George, Trigger Happy TV, The Armstrong and Miller Show, The Strangerers, Stressed Eric, The Jack Docherty Show and Meg and Mog.
