= Absolutely Productions =

British media production company

Absolutely Productions is a British media production company, working mostly in television, formed in 1988 by Morwenna Banks, Jack Docherty, Moray Hunter, Pete Baikie, John Sparkes, and Gordon Kennedy, all of whom were the cast of British television comedy sketch show Absolutely.

== Productions ==
- Absolutely
- Mr. Don and Mr. George
- Trigger Happy TV
- Meg and Mog
- Stressed Eric
- Deadsville
- The Creatives
- Armstrong and Miller
- Barry Welsh Is Coming
- Jeff Global's Global Probe
- Very Old Pretenders
- Reluctant Persuaders (radio)
