= The Creatives =

- Genre: Sitcom
- Created by: Jack Docherty; Moray Hunter
- Directed by: Andy De Emmony (Series 1); John Birkin (Series 2)
- Starring: Roger Allam; Jack Docherty; Moray Hunter; Pippa Guard; Aislín McGuckin; Arabella Weir; Ricky Callan
- Theme music composer: Peter Baikie
- Country of origin: United Kingdom
- Original language: English
- No. of series: 2
- No. of episodes: 12

Production
- Executive producers: Mike Bolland; Miles Bullough
- Producers: Jamie Rix (1998); Philip Clarke (2000)
- Production locations: London, England, UK
- Running time: 30 minutes
- Production company: Absolutely Productions

Original release
- Network: BBC Two
- Release: 2 October 1998 – 16 February 2000

The Creatives is a British sitcom created by Jack Docherty and Moray Hunter which ran for two series between 2 October 1998 and 16 February 2000 on BBC Two. The series starred Roger Allam, Jack Docherty, Moray Hunter, Pippa Guard, Aislín McGuckin, Arabella Weir and Ricky Callan as the titular people.

== Plot ==
The Creatives is an advertising agency that has faded from its 1980s heyday. Charlie Baxter is the boss - a one-time whizkid hot shot, now world-weary and seeking solace in liquor and casual sex. The agency's principal creative brains are Ben and Robbie. Robbie is going out with the firm's advertising producer Lauren, and Ben is married to the emotional and insanely jealous Tanya, an Italian who is a secretary at the firm. Max is their film director and Rhona is the new assistant - she's a sparky lass who has no qualms about telling her colleagues they're a bunch of has-beens.

The first series followed the ups and downs of the crew as they pitched for and lost various campaigns. The second was considerably different, though, being edgier, darker and more challenging. The agency is thriving once again but Ben is having serious marital problems (we do not see Tanya), Robbie and Lauren seem to have parted, and Rhona has left for newer pastures. The episodes revolved more around the private relationships and the concerns of Ben and Robbie than their professional lives, which the writers felt was closer to their original vision. Co-writer and co-star Moray Hunter looked very different, too, having shed four stones since the first series.

== Cast ==
- Roger Allam as Charlie Baxter
- Jack Docherty as Ben Gray
- Moray Hunter as Robbie Fraser
- Pippa Guard as Lauren Marshall
- Ricky Callan as Alan
- Robert Marley as Max
- Aislín McGuckin as Rhona Platt (series 1)
- Arabella Weir as Tanya Gray (series 1)
- Fiona Bell as Joanna (series 2)
- Stuart McGuigan as Cameron (series 2)

== Episodes ==
=== Series overview ===
Series	Episodes	Originally released	
Series	Episodes	First released	Last released
1	6	2 October 1998	6 November 1998
2	6	12 January 2000	16 February 2000

=== Series 1 (1998) ===
No.	Title	Directed by	Written by	Original release date
1	"Soup Family Robinson"	Andy De Emmony	Jack Docherty & Moray Hunter	2 October 1998
2	"Jump Cut"	Andy De Emmony	Jack Docherty & Moray Hunter	9 October 1998
3	"Pocy Pola"	Andy De Emmony	Jack Docherty & Moray Hunter	16 October 1998
4	"Backwards Scottish Nutcase"	Andy De Emmony	Jack Docherty & Moray Hunter	23 October 1998
5	"Come to Cummerton"	Andy De Emmony	Jack Docherty & Moray Hunter	30 October 1998
6	"Black"	Andy De Emmony	Jack Docherty & Moray Hunter	6 November 1998

=== Series 2 (2000) ===
No. overall	No. in season	Title	Directed by	Written by	Original release date
7	1	"She Was the One"	John Birkin	Jack Docherty & Moray Hunter	12 January 2000
8	2	"By the Way"	John Birkin	Jack Docherty & Moray Hunter	19 January 2000
9	3	"Over a Week"	John Birkin	Jack Docherty & Moray Hunter	26 January 2000
10	4	"Doss Radge Bams"	John Birkin	Jack Docherty & Moray Hunter	2 February 2000
11	5	"Et Tu Stumpy"	John Birkin	Jack Docherty & Moray Hunter	9 February 2000
12	6	"Lenny the Bruce"	John Birkin	Jack Docherty & Moray Hunter	16 February 2000
