= Barry Welsh Is Coming =

Welsh sketch show

- Also known as: Barry Welsh Is Going
- Directed by: Matt Lipsey; Lissa Evans; Peter Boyd Maclean; Alan Nixon; Huw Parry
- Starring: John Sparkes
- Theme music composer: Pete Baikie
- Country of origin: Wales
- No. of episodes: 58 episodes (including 8 specials)

Production
- Executive producer: Elis Owen
- Producers: Pete Baikie; Alan Nixon
- Production locations: Cardiff, Wales
- Editor: Huw Parry
- Camera setup: Multi-camera
- Running time: 30 minutes
- Production company: Absolutely Productions

Original release
- Network: HTV Wales
- Release: 6 September 1996 – 8 March 2004

Related
- Absolutely; Jeff Global's Global Probe

Barry Welsh Is Coming is a Welsh sketch show produced by Absolutely Productions for HTV Wales. The programme was first broadcast at 10:40 pm on Friday 6 September 1996 and originally ran for six series with some episodes later broadcast on the Paramount Comedy Channel. It was produced by Pete Baikie, and almost all the main characters were played by John Sparkes, who also played the inept presenter Barry Welsh. For the final series, the show was renamed Barry Welsh Is Going and consisted of three compilation specials. The series was replaced by Jeff Global's Global Probe, which ended after six episodes.

The TV series also featured cast members from the Channel 4 series Absolutely, while some character elements from Absolutely were incorporated into the programme. Denzil and Gwynedd, two of the original Absolutely characters, briefly returned in Barry Welsh Is Coming for shorter sketches, now accompanied by their 21-year-old son, Codfyl.

The show returned in 2007 in the form of three themed specials broadcast throughout the year, presented by Sparkes in the guise of Fishguard news reporter Hugh Pugh. The new episodes were produced in-house by ITV Wales.

== Characters ==
=== Hugh Pugh ===
In the most popular segment of the programme, Hugh Pugh was a news reporter from Fishguard in West Wales played by John Sparkes. He had a strong aversion towards Barry Welsh, partly because Cardiff is more "advanced" than Fishguard, and partly because Barry Welsh is the host of the show. His reports were generally in black and white, suggesting that Fishguard itself is in black and white because it is behind the rest of Wales. The news reports are made to match old news reels to accommodate Sparkes' jokes. Hugh Pugh holds an old-fashioned microphone in one hand, but is always holding the lead's plug in the other.

Crime in Fishguard is kept under control by Detective Chief Inspector Shortarse, leader of the Santa Squad, a crime unit featuring policemen all dressed as Santa Claus. The most wanted man in Fishguard is ganglord Larry Island (A satire of Barry Island), who runs a gang of baby criminals trained to steal toys and make forgery paintings. Members of the gang include Mad One-Eyed Jack and Baby-Faced Baby.

Transport in Fishguard is restricted to motor vehicles for moving about in the town. A small railway, the Fishguard - Fishguard Railway (run by Fishrail) is also used. To get around outside of Fishguard, the main mode of transport is lace-up shoes, although there are elastic-sided boots on some routes. A pipeline was also built to pump thousands of tourists each year into West Wales, but the casualties from its first run meant that it was soon replaced by an A-Road.

Most of the newsreels of Fishguard are doctored from old newscasts from the 1960s, with the names of celebrities altered for humour, including Richard Cliff (Cliff Richard) and East Clintwood (Clint Eastwood).

Other characters from Fishguard include Mayor Kenny Twat, the mayor's son Rasputin Twat, Terry Phone of the Telephone Club, fireman Norman Helmet, farmer Dung bowen, retired soldier Mr. Clinc-Lee Dead, Mrs. Hideous, coracle enthusiast Geraint Pillock, the girl group The Pop Tarts, Anne Robinson, Trevor McDonald, Pamela Anderson, the Welsh-Language Homosexual Society, the West Wales Tortoise Impersonation Society, Colonel Tosser Thompson and the Royal Fish-Guards, Mr. Slightly Thomas, the Fishguard Staring Club, Dr. Raj Willseeyounow at St. Sardines Hospital, the 92-year-old plastic surgeon with poor vision Doctor Jekyll, trouser expert Professor Zip Fastener, and Sam and Ella Vomit of Sam and Ella's restaurant.

==== Hugh Pugh spin-off specials ====
Hugh Pugh has featured in four one-off specials of Barry Welsh Is Coming. The first, in 1999, was The Fishguard Film Festival, which won the BAFTA Cymru award for Best Light Entertainment.

Then in 2004, the character presented a mockumentary about the history of Wales, stretching from the Stone Age to the modern day. The History of Wales according to Hugh Pugh went on to win the BAFTA Cymru award for Best Light Entertainment a year later.

Barry Welsh Is Coming returned in 2007 with a series of three themed specials broadcast throughout the year starring Hugh Pugh. Barry Welsh Has An Election (broadcast: 3 May 2007) featured mock coverage of the Fishguard mayoral election whilst Hugh Pugh Kicks Off (broadcast: 6 September 2007) took an offbeat look at the Rugby World Cup. A Christmas special, Hugh Pugh's Christmas Cracker (broadcast: 18 December 2007) featured highlights from the past ten years of spoof news bulletins and reports from Fishguard.

=== A.R.S. ===
The Animal Rescue Squad (or A.R.S. – pronounced as "arse"), is a lampoon of Animal Hospital and other animal welfare shows. The series is set in and around Cardiff, and features the short-tempered Dave Daley (Kim Wall), Dave Sinclair (John Sparkes), Dave Webster (Gordon Kennedy) at A.R.S. Control (his mother's home), and an unnamed cameraman (Pete Baikie) who is always bullied by Dave Daley when Daley is in a fit of rage. The A.R.S. tend to rescue mostly insects such as spiders and wasps rather than larger animals, although dogs appeared in later sketches. The sketches are narrated by Morwenna Banks.

=== Mr. Ffff ===
A dirty old man who explains about his sex life with elements of toilet humour from Frank Hovis. He frequently talks about masturbation and oral sex. He is often billed as "the oldest man in Wales". There was also a short sketch with Siadwel, previously performed on Naked Video.

=== Geraint Pillock ===
An edited 1970s news film featuring coracle enthusiast Denzil Davies, whose film has been doctored to appear as if "Geraint Pillock of Colwyn Bay" (as Barry Welsh names him) is trying bizarre feats in a coracle. The various challenges are attempted "mainly because it's a challenge, a challenge for me and a challenge for the coracle". The various challenges that Geraint attempts include crossing the Sahara Desert, travelling at 740 miles per hour, conquering the glaciers of the North Pole, circling the M25 for a year, and going to Mars. In the 2007 special Barry Welsh Has An Election, Geraint was elected as the Mayor of Fishguard.

=== Gwyn ===
An eccentric with a twitch (originally seen in Absolutely) based on Frank Hovis, but without the toilet humour. Elements of Hovis' karaoke to Stoneybridge were recycled when Gwyn sang live to the studio audience.

=== Aneurin Anus ===
A mock gardening show with strong gay sexual humour. Aneurin is a stereotypical Welsh gardener who was originally censored because of the strong content of anal jokes relating to homosexuality, but he is included in the VHS release of Barry Welsh: The Second Coming.

=== Kenny Twat ===
The former mayor of Fishguard. He was voted out in the 2007 Fishguard mayoral election (as seen in Barry Welsh Has An Election) after 70 years in office.

== One-off specials ==
There have been a number of special one-off episodes, all of them with a particular theme.

- Hugh Pugh Presents: The Fishguard Film Festival (27 March 2000)

A special programme from the fictitious Fishguard Film Festival. This episode won a BAFTA Cymru award for Best Light Entertainment.

- St. David: Myth or Mister? (1 March 2001)

A St. David's Day special in which Barry Welsh searches for the truth behind the patron saint of Wales.

- Barry Welsh Stays Up for St. David (28 February 2003)

Barry is joined by Gwyn, Mr. Ffff, Pete Baikie, and Beca Evans (Pub Quiz) for a "live" Hogmanay-style extravaganza as Wales counts down to midnight and the "Welshest day of the year", St. David's Day.

- The History of Wales according to Hugh Pugh (1 March 2004)

The third St. David's Day special from the series, in which Hugh Pugh provides his own personal account of ten thousand years of Welsh history. This episode won the 2005 BAFTA Cymru award for Best Light Entertainment.

- Barry Welsh Has An Election (3 May 2007)

As part of ITV Wales's Welsh Assembly election coverage, Hugh Pugh presents coverage of the Fishguard mayoral election, in which Mayor of Fishguard Mr. Kenny Twat stood for election against rival candidates Barry Welsh and Geraint Pillock.

- Hugh Pugh Kicks Off (6 September 2007)

The manic Fishguard reporter focuses on the build-up to the 2007 Rugby World Cup.

- Hugh Pugh's Christmas Cracker (19 December 2007)

A special Christmas episode looking back at the highlights from ten years of spoof news bulletins and reports from Fishguard reporter, Hugh Pugh.
