= AudioGO =

Audiobook publisher (2010–2013)

- Parent company: AudioGO Ltd, BBC Worldwide
- Founded: 2010
- Defunct: 2014
- Successor: Blackstone Audio, Audible, Random House
- Country of origin: United Kingdom
- Headquarters location: Bath
- Key people: Michael Kuhn
- Publication types: audiobooks, books
- Imprints: AudioGO, BBC Audio, BBC Radio Collection
- Revenue: £25.9m p.a. (as at 2010)
- No. of employees: 140 (as at 2010)
- Official website: Official website (defunct)

AudioGO (formerly BBC Audiobooks) was a British publisher of audiobooks and a range of spoken word and large-print titles. It was majority owned by AudioGO Ltd, and minority owned by BBC Worldwide. It was formed in 2010, when AudioGO purchased a majority share in BBC Audiobooks, and traded until it went into administration in 2013.

AudioGO published unabridged audio novels, and the BBC Radio Collection which incorporated dramatisations and non-fiction output derived from BBC Radio programmes. Novels were published under the imprint AudioGO, and BBC-sourced content under the BBC Audio imprint, the latter making up about 20% of new titles as at 2010.

== Catalogue ==
AudioGO had about 8,500 titles in its catalogue at the time it went into administration in 2013. Thereupon AudioGO's catalogue of non-BBC titles was sold to Audible.com.

The BBC titles, formerly known as the BBC Radio Collection, and considered by industry experts to be the most valuable asset, were licensed to Random House Audio. These included popular radio dramatisations such as Doctor Who, The Hobbit and The Lord of the Rings, as well as radio comedy including I'm Sorry I Haven't a Clue and Just a Minute.

== Commercial History ==
Owned by BBC Worldwide, BBC Audiobooks was created by the amalgamation of BBC Radio Collection, Cover to Cover and Chivers Audio Books (Chivers Press) in 2001. Cover to Cover was started by Helen Nicoll, the author of the Meg and Mog books, in 1983, and specialised in unabridged audio recordings; BBC Audiobooks bought it in 2000. Chivers Audio Books was one of the early commercial audiobook companies and among the first to employ professional actors for narration and included an American arm, Chivers Sound Library.

In 2007, BBC Audiobooks America acquired Audio Partners, publisher of the Arkangel Shakespeare.

In July 2010, BBC Worldwide, at that time led by CEO John Smith, sold an 85% stake in BBC Audiobooks to AudioGO Ltd, a company set up by former Polygram senior executive Michael Kuhn and six partners, for a reported £10m to £15m. In 2011, AudioGO acquired US children's audiobook firm Audio Bookshelf.

In October 2013 AudioGO Ltd announced that it was suspending operations, due to "significant financial challenges", and was seeking fresh investment or a sale of the business. The US arm, Blackstone Audio which had been acquired in January 2013, was sold back to its founders, the Black family, with other AudioGO US operations at the same time.

At the end of October 2013, AudioGO Ltd filed a notice of intention to appoint administrators as it was unable to find a buyer or investor. Accountancy firm BDO were appointed as administrator.

In November 2013 it was announced that 57 employees had been made redundant, and that the licensing rights to 5,000 non-BBC titles would be transferred to Amazon.com-owned Audible pending approval from affected authors and publishers. In December 2013, Random House Audio reached an agreement with BBC Worldwide to license the rights to the prestigious 3,500 BBC audio catalogue, saying that it would take "sole responsibility for sales, stock management and distribution of BBC-branded physical CDs in the UK and the rest of the world excluding North America, Australia and New Zealand," and "take global responsibility for download sales with leading digital retailers, including Audible".

The AudioGo website reported it would close on 1 February 2014. However, sales ceased on the website months before then.
