= The Jack Docherty Show =

British television series

- Directed by: David G. Croft; Peter Demetris
- Starring: Jack Docherty
- Country of origin: United Kingdom
- Original language: English

Production
- Producers: Phil Edgar Jones; Gavin Claxton
- Running time: 40 minutes (including adverts)
- Production company: Absolutely Productions

Original release
- Network: Channel 5
- Release: 30 March 1997 – 23 June 1999

The Jack Docherty Show was a weeknightly comedy chat show which first aired on Channel 5 in the United Kingdom between 30 March 1997 and 23 June 1999. Presented by comedian Jack Docherty, the programme was one of the first to air on the channel, doing so as part of its opening-night schedule on 30 March 1997. The show was recorded at London's Whitehall Theatre during the early evening and would then be broadcast in a late-night slot. It featured a mixture of chat with celebrity guests, comedy, and music, and followed a similar format to shows such as NBC's Late Night with David Letterman in the United States.

Accompanying Docherty and guests was a house band, whose line-up changed from time to time. It was first briefly led by Pete Baikie, followed a few weeks later by Richard Allen. They named the studio band Pete Baikie and the Peetles and Richard Allen and the Allenoids respectively. In September 1997 a new house band, Blair, fronted by Blair MacKichan, took over the role and remained until the house band was dispensed with some time in 1998. MacKichan was better known for his appearance in the Oxo adverts during the 1980s, but was an accomplished musician.

Docherty was frequently absent from the programme, usually during school holidays, and when this happened the show was retitled Not The Jack Docherty Show and would be presented by a stand-in. Guest presenters included Phill Jupitus, Graham Norton, Fred MacAulay, Carol McGiffin, Melinda Messenger, Rich Hall and Tim Vine. The role of guest host helped launch Graham Norton's television career, and won him the award for best newcomer at the 1997 British Comedy Awards. Docherty – who was also attending the ceremony – had expected to win the award himself. Norton went on to front his own series on Channel 4 in 1998 titled So Graham Norton.

Channel 5 had originally wanted to call the show The Docherty Will See You Now, and when first on air it was broadcast five nights a week. However, as the series progressed numbers of episodes were reduced as the channel moved away from its original "stripped and stranded" scheduling format, and, in the first instance, because Docherty had requested he do fewer shows. From September 1997 it dropped to four nights a week when the Friday edition was withdrawn from the schedule, then three in March 1998 after Monday's episode was also dropped. By September 1998 the series dropped to a Tuesday and Thursday airing, while the Wednesday slot was then taken up with the somewhat similar Melinda's Big Night In, a chat show hosted by Melinda Messenger. One weekly episode of The Jack Docherty Show was aired during its last few months. The final edition went out on 23 June 1999, by which time it was pre-recorded in advance of its airdate.

The decreasing number of weekly editions also had much to do with the show's poor viewing figures. Often these would be higher when Docherty was absent, with model Melinda Messenger achieving higher viewing figures when she stood in for him. The show was also panned by critics, particularly when, in 1998, Docherty decided not to renew his contract with Channel 5 when it expired at the end of that year. In November 1998 a television reviewer in The Independent observed: "In effect, The Jack Docherty Show is working out its notice. And boy, does it show. It's as if Docherty is perfunctorily doing his job even as the removal men are dismantling the show and packing it off to the archive. The house band has gone, the flats of the set have been taken down, and the script has been stowed at the bottom of a cardboard box file." This sentiment was echoed in the 19 February 1999 edition of Private Eye, which claimed that Docherty had closed one episode with the words, "In line with Channel 5 policy, it's past eleven o'clock and time for some tatty pornography", and had then simulated fellatio on a pizza salesman. The scene was edited out before broadcast in what Private Eye suggested was a decision influenced by criticism of Channel 5, which at the time included soft-core pornography in its schedule. In January 2010, The Guardian's Sam Leith wrote that The Jack Docherty Show had "died a death", musing: "I'm not sure even Jack Docherty remembers it very well."

In March 1999, Docherty said of his departure that he felt the show had "burned out" and was running out of guests. In a 2008 interview he said the role of chat show host had not suited him, and that he had not enjoyed it. "You would be talking to people about what they were doing, and you actually wanted to be doing it yourself." However, the programme is notable for featuring some of the first television work of writers Kevin Cecil and Andy Riley, Jesse Armstrong and Sam Bain, and writer/performers David Mitchell and Robert Webb, all of whom have gone on to have successful comedy careers.
