= It's Only TV...but I Like It =

Comedy celebrity panel gameshow

- Title card for series 2–4
- Genre: Comedy panel game
- Created by: Jonathan Ross; Andy Davies; Jon Naismith
- Directed by: David G. Croft; Ian Lorimer
- Presented by: Jonathan Ross
- Starring: Julian Clary; Jack Dee; Phill Jupitus
- Theme music composer: Pete Baikie
- Country of origin: United Kingdom
- Original language: English
- No. of seasons: 4
- No. of episodes: 32

Production
- Executive producer: Addison Cresswell
- Producers: Andy Davies; Jon Naismith; Shaun Pye
- Running time: 29 minutes
- Production company: Open Mike Productions

Original release
- Network: BBC One
- Release: 3 June 1999 – 16 August 2002

It's Only TV... but I Like It is a comedy celebrity panel gameshow about television. It originally aired on BBC One from 3 June 1999 to 23 August 2002. Its presenter was Jonathan Ross, and the regular team captains were Julian Clary, Jack Dee (series 1 only) and Phill Jupitus.

== Overview ==
The teams played through various rounds in order to gain points. Whichever team had the most points at the end was declared the winner. If both teams had equal points at the end, then the result was declared as a draw with no tie-breaker played.

=== Rounds ===
There were various rounds played throughout the series, including:

- TV Trivia – Each team is shown three clips that have a tenuous link to a moment in television history. It is up to the teams to try and decipher the link.
- Bad News or Are You Sitting Down? – The teams are shown a clip from a TV show, but the clip is paused before a piece of bad news is delivered. The teams must guess what bad news is. Programmes varied from soaps such as Coronation Street and EastEnders to crime dramas such as The Bill or The Sweeney, period dramas such as Poldark or Martin Chuzzlewit to children's programmes such as Pingu, Fireman Sam, Bob the Builder and Noddy.
- Here's One I Made Earlier – Inspired by the long-running BBC series Blue Peter, the teams are given ingredients to a real Blue Peter "make" and asked to come up with what they think the presenter made out of them.
- Channel Hopping – The guests make their way into the TV screen (in reality, an elevated section of the stage behind Jonathan), and the team captains don special earmuffs to block out any noise. The captains also have a remote control to choose one of five TV programmes, which the guests must mime along to the theme tune in order for their captain to guess the programme. From series 2, this game was played in every episode, having been in half the episodes of series 1. From series 3, each captain would have a pair of earmuffs decorated to look like a certain television programme.
- Opportunity Knockers – The teams are shown three clips of performers on talent shows such as New Faces, Opportunity Knocks or such programmes, and are asked to guess which of the three acts is still performing today. One such clip showed a teenage Toni Warne who in 2012 became a contestant on The Voice.
- Granny Knows Best – The teams are shown a montage of elderly people describing a television programme in an obtuse way, and are asked what programme they are talking about. If they guess it correctly from the first montage the team are awarded five points, but if they don't then they are shown a second montage where the clues become easier but the point value decreases the more clues they get.
- Masks – Where the team dons blindfolds and the opposing captain applies masks to the blindfolds of the opposite team, all of whom are faces from the same TV programme. The team then has to ask questions to the opposing side to guess who they are wearing masks of, mainly using yes-or-no questions. The teams could also occasionally score bonus points for guessing the character or personality on their mask.
- Dubbing – Each team is shown a clip of a television programme such as One Man and His Dog, The Clangers or Wildlife on One, but without the sound. The teams then provide a new dub over the clip (usually the team captain providing the narration while the guests provide incidental noises or additional commentary). Shown to the audience, but not the teams, is a list of five words related to the clip. Points are awarded for every word on the list that the teams get correct.
- Aliens – In this round, the teams are shown three aliens, one of which appeared in Doctor Who. The teams then ask the aliens questions as to their identities before voting on which is the real alien. Points are awarded for guessing correctly.
- Wine Tasting – The teams are given a wine to taste (which had appeared on Food and Drink) and are asked to guess what the presenters said about the wine. Points are awarded for each correct description. In one variation of this round, the contestants are asked to taste a beer; in this case, the beer was Weihenstephaner.
- Let's Laugh at Foreigners – The teams are shown three acts performing at a Eurovision Song Contest, and are asked which act got the fewest points.
- Are You Being Serviced? – The teams are shown a clip from a sitcom, usually Are You Being Served?, after which the round was named, and the clip is paused before the punchline is delivered. The teams have to guess what the punchline is.
- Charley Says – Based on the Charley Says series of public information films, the teams are shown a public information film, which is paused before the message is delivered. The teams have to guess what the film's message is.

The show always ended with a quickfire round with the teams on their buzzers. The three quickfire rounds were:

- Catchphrase – Played in series 1, the teams simply had to complete the unfinished catchphrases read out by Jonathan.
- Who Said That? – Played in series 2 and 3, Jonathan would read out a line of dialogue from a TV programme and the teams have to guess the character or person who said it.
- Quickfire Trivia – Played in series 4, this was a straightforward round of quickfire trivia questions, also incorporating catchphrases and identifying two TV personalities morphed together into one picture.

== Return ==
The show returned on 5 March 2011 for a special during the BBC's 24 Hour Panel People in aid of Comic Relief 2011. The show's former team captain Jack Dee hosted with Ulrika Jonsson and Charlie Brooker as team captains. The guests were David Walliams, Danny Wallace, Tom Deacon and Penny Smith.

== Episodes ==
The coloured backgrounds denote the result of each of the shows:

– indicates Julian's team won
– indicates Jack's/Phill's team won
– indicates the game ended in a draw

=== Series 1 (1999) ===
No.	Episode	First broadcast	Julian's guests	Jack's guests	Scores
1	1x01	3 June 1999	Ant & Dec and John Thomson	Caroline Aherne and Antony Worrall Thompson	15–6
2	1x02	10 June 1999	Fay Ripley and Barbara Windsor	John Challis and Neil Morrissey	15–17
3	1x03	17 June 1999	Leslie Ash and Bill Tarmey	Patsy Palmer and Rowland Rivron	22–19
4	1x04	24 June 1999	John Leslie and Wendy Richard	Sarah White and Richard Whiteley	21–14
5	1x05	1 July 1999	Wolf and John Inman	Mark Lamarr and Trev & Simon	13–13
6	1x06	8 July 1999	Nigel Havers and Lorraine Kelly	Jayne Middlemiss and Tim Healy	30–11
7	1x07	15 July 1999	Leslie Grantham and Carol Smillie	Leslie Phillips and Jamie Theakston	TBC
8	1x08	22 July 1999	Ainsley Harriott and Melanie Sykes	John Noakes and Les Dennis	TBC

=== Series 2 (2000) ===
No.	Episode	First broadcast	Julian's guests	Phill's guests	Scores
9	2x01	24 February 2000	Laurence Llewelyn-Bowen and Adam Rickitt	Ulrika Jonsson and Leslie Phillips	20-6
10	2x02	2 March 2000	Davina McCall and Dean Sullivan	Esther Rantzen and Max Beesley	TBC
11	2x03	9 March 2000	Anna Ryder Richardson and Angela Griffin	John Sergeant and Noddy Holder	TBC
12	2x04	16 March 2000	Shane Richie and Gloria Hunniford	Alice Beer and Jack Docherty	TBC
13	2x05	23 March 2000	Shaun Williamson and Donna Air	Norman Wisdom and Meera Syal	TBC
14	2x06	30 March 2000	Keith Chegwin and Amanda Holden	Peter Davison and Suggs	TBC
15	2x07	6 April 2000	Oz Clarke and Kirsty Young	Fern Britton and "Handy" Andy	8–17
16	2x08	13 April 2000	Boy George and Charlotte Coleman	Esther McVey and Phil Daniels	TBC

=== Series 3 (2001) ===
No.	Episode	First broadcast	Julian's guests	Phill's guests	Scores
17	3x01	23 February 2001	"Nasty" Nick and Lisa Rogers	Claire Sweeney and Ainsley Harriott	16–12
18	3x02	2 March 2001	Richard Blackwood and Valerie Singleton	Gail Porter and Graham Cole	11–10
19	3x03	9 March 2001	Dermot O'Leary and Liz Smith	Linda Barker and Richard Whiteley	16–15
20	3x04	16 March 2001	Patrick Kielty and Keith Duffy	Vanessa Feltz and Jeremy Spake	23–12
21	3x05	23 March 2001	Ralf Little and Gaby Roslin	Emma Noble and Rich Hall	TBC
22	3x06	30 March 2001	Jim Bowen and Philippa Forrester	Tricia Penrose and Fred MacAulay	TBC
23	3x07	13 April 2001	Rowland Rivron and Linda Robson	Doon Mackichan and Les Dennis	TBC
24	3x08	20 April 2001	Craig Doyle and Jilly Goolden	Michelle Collins and Laurence Llewelyn-Bowen	15–15

=== Series 4 (2002) ===
No.	Episode	First broadcast	Julian's guests	Phill's guests	Scores
25	4x01	28 June 2002	Joe Mace and Jennie Bond	Terry Wogan and Ainsley Harriott	19–19
26	4x02	5 July 2002	Ian McCaskill and Myleene Klass	Lucy Speed and Richard Blackwood	8–9
27	4x03	12 July 2002	Vernon Kay and Debra Stephenson	Angela Rippon and Jo Brand	TBC
28	4x04	19 July 2002	Barbara Windsor and Keith Harris (Note: Harris was accompanied by his puppets, Orville the Duck and Cuddles the Monkey.)	Carol Smillie and Adam and Joe	TBC
29	4x05	26 July 2002	Ed Byrne and Angela Griffin	David Dickinson and Steven Pinder	17–15
30	4x06	2 August 2002	Cannon and Ball and Gina Yashere	Patsy Palmer and Stuart Hall	14-14
31	4x07	9 August 2002	Roy Walker and Katy Hill	Diarmuid Gavin and Nicholas Bailey	TBC
32	4x08	16 August 2002	The Krankies and Goldie	Coleen Nolan and Gary Beadle	TBC
