= Very Old Pretenders =

- Genre: Mockumentary
- Running time: 28 minutes
- Country of origin: United Kingdom
- Language: English
- Home station: BBC Radio 4
- Starring: David Haig; Rebecca Front; Jack Docherty; Gordon Kennedy; Moray Hunter; Morwenna Banks; Carl Gorham; Lucy Barter; Sinead Merron; Nicholas Burns
- Created by: Carl Gorham
- Written by: Carl Gorham
- Produced by: Gordon Kennedy
- Original release: 15 September – 6 October 2011
- No. of series: 1
- No. of episodes: 4

Very Old Pretenders is a comedy mockumentary on BBC Radio 4 which was first broadcast between 15 September and 6 October 2011.

== Plot ==
A fictional anthropologist discover two Jacobite soldiers, preserved alive in a cave since 1745, and introduces them to modern life.

== Production ==
Very Old Pretenders was written by Carl Gorham, known to British audiences for his earlier Gorham and Swift radio sitcom and the television series Stressed Eric. It was produced by Absolutely Productions.

== Reception ==
Initial reviews (from advance copies sent to critics) were positive, Ron Hewit in the Radio Times calling it "terrific", and Gillian Reynolds in the Telegraph suggested it was very funny if, along with her, one likes "Scotsmen plus a bustling conjunction of the real with the surreal".

== Episodes ==
No.	Title	Original release date
1	"The Patriots"	15 September 2011
Fictional — but stressed — anthropologist Andrew Merron endeavours to induct two Jacobite soldiers, mysteriously preserved in a cave since 1745, into modern life. Introducing them to the Scotland of today starts with a trip to a tartan shop on Edinburgh's Royal Mile, and a football (soccer) World Cup qualifying match where Scotland takes on the Dickson Isles.
2	"In Therapy"	22 September 2011
Tension between the superannuated soldiers leads to a bust-up with broadswords, and a solution is attempted through the modern concept of therapy.
3	"The Dating Game"	29 September 2011
The anthropologist takes his eighteenth-century Romeos speed-dating, with predictably grotesque results.
4	"On Television"	6 October 2011
Andrew gets the antique Scots into a pitch for a new television show — and one of them swaps his claymore for a Bafta.
