= Starlings (TV series) =

- Genre: Comedy drama
- Written by: Steve Edge; Matt King
- Directed by: Matt Lipsey; Tony Dow
- Starring: Brendan Coyle; Lesley Sharp; Steve Edge; Matt King; Alan Williams; Rebecca Night; Ukweli Roach; Finn Atkins; John Dagleish
- Country of origin: United Kingdom
- Original language: English
- No. of series: 2
- No. of episodes: 16

Production
- Running time: 60mins (inc. adverts)
- Production company: Baby Cow Productions

Original release
- Network: Sky 1
- Release: 13 May 2012 – 20 August 2013

Starlings is a British comedy-drama written by Steve Edge and Matt King who also play the roles of Fergie and Uncle Loz. It was shown on Sky 1. In September 2013, Sky1 announced it was cancelling the show after two seasons.

== Premise ==
Terry and Jan Starling have been happily married for many years, living in Matlock, Derbyshire. They have three children. Their eldest, Bell, is in her early 20s and is pregnant by her boyfriend Reuben. Graham, known as Gravy, has left school but is currently unemployed. Charlotte, known as Charlie, is the youngest, and works with Terry in his capacity as a self-employed electrician. Other members of the family include Terry's elderly father, Bill, and Jan's nephew Fergie. In the first episode the family meet Lawrence, known as Loz, for the first time. He is Bill's long lost son, and therefore Terry's half brother.

== Cast ==
- Brendan Coyle as Terry
- Lesley Sharp as Jan
- Steve Edge as Fergie
- Matt King as Loz
- Alan Williams as Grandad
- Rebecca Night as Bell
- Ukweli Roach as Reuben
- Finn Atkins as Charlie
- John Dagleish as Gravy
- Robyn Addison as Lisa

== Episodes ==
=== Series 1 (2012) ===
| No. | Title | Directed by | Written by | Original release date | UK viewers (millions) |
|---|---|---|---|---|---|
| 1 | "Episode One" | Matt Lipsey | Steve Edge & Matt King | 13 May 2012 | 995,000 |
Terry and Jan Starling prepare for two new additions, including daughter Bell's baby, who is born in a birthing pool located in the living room.
| 2 | "Episode Two" | Tony Dow | Steve Edge & Matt King | 20 May 2012 | 760,000 |
Charlie joins her father's electrical business and has to cope with a hectic schedule of appointments, her first task being to work her charm on the company's elderly clients. Meanwhile, Reuben searches for a job, Gravy ponders an exciting new venture, and the family rallies around Uncle Loz as he makes his debut at a local art exhibition.
| 3 | "Episode Three" | Tony Dow | Steve Edge & Matt King | 27 May 2012 | 457,000 |
Jan decides to enter a short-story competition, but is forced to contend with a number of distractions, including Grandad, who is acting more strangely than usual after doubling up on his arthritis medication. Meanwhile, Bell returns to work on a less-than-glamorous photoshoot, Uncle Loz considers living in a house for Buddhists, and Gravy gets a new girlfriend.
| 4 | "Episode Four" | Matt Lipsey | Steve Edge & Matt King | 3 June 2012 | 466,000 |
Gravy tries to sample independence when Jan grows concerned about his lifestyle, worrying that her eldest son will live with her for ever. Meanwhile, Terry is forced to face the fact that Charlie is growing up when she goes on her first date, Bell and Reuben's relationship begins to blossom, and Loz and Fergie enter the Monster Machine Extravaganza at a local agricultural show.
| 5 | "Episode Five" | Tony Dow | Steve Edge & Matt King | 10 June 2012 | 413,000 |
Fergie finds himself behind bars after losing his patience in a traffic jam, and Loz has a reunion with his younger brother Lee, who wants him to attend a combat event in Nottingham. Meanwhile, Terry makes plans to defeat his quizzing rival Brian Valentine, Jan dreads attending book club and Grandad goes on a date.
| 6 | "Episode Six" | Matt Lipsey | Steve Edge & Matt King | 17 June 2012 | 447,000 |
Terry and Jan celebrate their anniversary, but plans to hire a personal chef and have a candlelit bath go awry. Meanwhile, Fergie, Loz, Grandad, Gravy and Charlie embark on a disastrous camping trip, compounded by sprained ankles, poor navigational skills and Grandad's failure to remember to record the Antiques Roadshow.
| 7 | "Episode Seven" | Tony Dow | Steve Edge & Matt King | 24 June 2012 | 418,000 |
Loz's thrill-seeking new girlfriend causes tension between him and Ferg, and threatens to distract the duo from their new business venture - retro taxis. Meanwhile, Bell and Reuben seek relationship advice from a counsellor and Charlie catches the eye of a football scout at a match.
| 8 | "Episode Eight" | Matt Lipsey | Steve Edge & Matt King | 1 July 2012 | 558,000 |
The death of an old friend visiting from Australia hits Grandad hard, causing the rest of the shocked family to make some big decisions. Terry tries to get Belle and Reuben back together, but Reuben has a new girlfriend, Lou Lou. Fergie drops a bombshell on Loz, announcing he's going on his travels again.

=== Series 2 (2013) ===
| No. overall | No. in series | Title | Directed by | Written by | Original release date | UK viewers (millions) |
|---|---|---|---|---|---|---|
| 9 | 1 | "Episode One" | Philippa Langdale | Steve Edge & Matt King | 2 July 2013 | 335,000 |
Jan enrols on a creative writing course, but gets more than she bargained for when the tutor takes an extracurricular interest in her. Meanwhile, daughter Charlie is forced to reconsider her future following an accident on a building site. On a lighter note, Gravy and Grandad search the garden for buried treasure, while Reuben needs to ask Bell a big question - so he ropes in Fergie and Loz to help.
| 10 | 2 | "Episode Two" | Philippa Langdale | Steve Edge & Matt King | 9 July 2013 | 334,000 |
Stephen's interest in Jan grows during a class trip, Bell clashes with her mother-in-law and grandad's pal introduces him to internet dating. Fergie launches a new venture - an organic campsite - with Lol and Gravy on hand to help, while Terry's attempt to finish Rodney's restaurant isn't made any easier by the ex-footballer's inability to make up his mind.
| 11 | 3 | "Episode Three" | Tony Smith | Steve Edge & Matt King | 16 July 2013 | Under 310,000 |
Jan reminds Terry of a promise he made years ago about getting a vasectomy once the kids were older - but that was a long time ago. However, a more pressing concern awaits when he meets her tutor, Stephen, for the first time. Fergie tags along with Loz on a staff night, only to realise he has already crossed paths with headteacher Judith, emotions run high when Charlie opens up to Grandad and Gravy has an epiphany regarding his dead-end job.
| 12 | 4 | "Episode Four" | Tony Smith | Steve Edge & Matt King | 23 July 2013 | Under 387,000 |
Terry, Grandad and Loz embark on a fishing trip, but any hopes of quiet relaxation are ruined by a bout of seasickness, one too many glasses of rum and a flooded boat engine. However, it does allow Loz to get a few long-held feelings off his chest. Fergie opens his new site, only to run into trouble with a couple of unhappy campers, while Jan doesn't like the idea of Charlie buying her first car and Gravy makes a grand gesture to help a friend in need.
| 13 | 5 | "Episode Five" | Sam Donovan | Steve Edge & Matt King | 30 July 2013 | Under 322,000 |
Jan heads off on another class outing to a picturesque hotel, tasked with writing something worthwhile. However, the assignment is the last thing on her mind as she challenges tutor Stephen over the attention he's been giving her. Meanwhile, poorly husband Terry gets his gladrags on for the opening of Rodney's Bistro, and Grandad decides that internet dating isn't for him after all. Gravy and Coggie gather evidence to prove they're a couple, while Loz starts to feel increasingly uncomfortable about Fergie and Judith's history together.
| 14 | 6 | "Episode Six" | Sam Donovan | Steve Edge & Matt King | 6 August 2013 | Under 302,000 |
The family is rocked by the unexpected arrival of Fergie's estranged mum Sandra - and it soon becomes clear that mother and son have some issues to sort out. Jan shuns Gravy over his impromptu engagement and gives Charlie a piece of her mind because of her newfound interest in motorbikes - and her mood tumbles even further when Terry tries to persuade her to consider the move to Majorca. Grandad turns down a dancing date with Molly, while Reuben fails to make the most of his time alone with Bell.
| 15 | 7 | "Episode Seven" | Sam Donovan | Steve Edge & Matt King | 13 August 2013 | Under 363,000 |
Jan and the rest of the family are worried about Terry, who is acting moody and distant in the wake of his medical emergency. However, he is soon jolted back to life when Steven sneaks by the house to drop off a book of poetry - leading to a confrontation with his wife's tutor. Things appear to be getting serious between Grandad and Molly when she asks him to move in, a run in the park leads to an awkward encounter for Reuben and Bell, and Loz asks Fergie a big favour to increase his chances of getting a permanent job at the school.
| 16 | 8 | "Episode Eight" | Sam Donovan | Steve Edge & Matt King | 20 August 2013 | Under 336,000 |
Reuben and Bell's big day arrives but soon runs into problems when the groom suffers terrible nerves and then gets locked in. So while Terry, Fergie and Loz rally round to get him to the church on time, Jan does her best to ensure her daughter is kept in the dark about what's going on. Meanwhile, Grandad bumps into Molly's ex-husband and an enlightening chat with Coggie helps Gravy reach a huge decision.

== Home release ==
The first series of Starlings was released on DVD on 9 July 2012.
