= Jan Pieńkowski =

Polish-British author and illustrator (1936–2022)

- Born: 8 August 1936; Warsaw, Poland
- Died: 19 February 2022 (aged 85); Fulham, London, England
- Occupations: Writer, illustrator
- Spouse: David Walser (2005–2022)
- Writing career
- Genres: Children's literature, picture books, movable books
- Notable works: Meg and Mog; Pop-up books
- Notable awards: Kate Greenaway Medal; 1971, 1979
- Website: janpienkowski.com/home.htm

Jan Michał Pieńkowski (8 August 1936 – 19 February 2022) was a Polish-born British author of children's books—as illustrator, as writer, and as designer of movable books. He is best known for illustrating the Meg and Mog picture book series. He also did stage design for the theatre. For his contribution as a children's illustrator he was UK nominee in 1982 and again in 2008 for the biennial, international Hans Christian Andersen Award, the highest recognition available to creators of children's books.

WorldCat reports that Pieńkowski's work most widely held in participating libraries is Christmas, the King James Version (1984; US ISBN 0394869230), a 24-page picture book that "[u]ses the words of the Gospels of Luke and Matthew to present the story of the birth of Jesus."

== Early life and career ==
Jan Pieńkowski was born in Warsaw to Jerzy, a 'country squire before the war', later a farm manager, and Wanda (née Garlicka), a scientist. He was three years old in September 1939 when World War II began in Europe with the invasion of Poland. He was in an air-raid shelter during a Nazi firebomb attack, when a Polish insurgent showed him paper cut-out techniques. He later used these in over 150 picture books. From 1944, the family moved through Bavaria, Austria and Italy, before settling in Herefordshire, England, in 1946, where Pieńkowski attended Lucton School.

At the age of 10, he could not speak any English. However, a year later he passed his Eleven-Plus exam and attended the Cardinal Vaughan School in London and later read English and Classics at King's College, Cambridge. It was here that he met his friend, and later agent, Angela Holder, who persuaded him to turn one of his poster designs into a greetings card.

After leaving university, together they founded the Gallery Five greeting cards company. He began illustrating children's books in spare time but soon found it taking all his time.

In 1968, Pieńkowski began working with children's author Joan Aiken. He won the annual Kate Greenaway Medal for their 1971 book, The Kingdom Under the Sea and other stories (Jonathan Cape), eleven "fairy tales from Eastern Europe and Russia" retold by Aiken. That award by the Library Association recognised the year's best children's book illustration by a British subject. In retrospect the librarians call it "brilliantly illustrated in a highly original and recognisable silhouette style". One year earlier he had been one of three Greenaway runners up for The Golden Bird (J. M. Dent, 1970), written by Edith Brill. (Note: Today there are usually eight books on the Greenaway shortlist. According to CCSU, some runners up through 2002 were Commended (from 1959) or Highly Commended (from 1974). There were 99 commendations of both kinds in 44 years, including Pieńkowski and two others in 1970.)

Pieńkowski is probably best known for illustrating the Meg and Mog books written by Helen Nicoll, and for his pop-up books including Haunted House, Robot, Dinner Time, Good Night and 17 others.

Haunted House (Heinemann, 1979) earned Pieńkowski his second Greenaway Medal (no one has won three). The librarians describe it as "the house of petrifying pop-ups". The pop-up book was so successful that Intervisual Books Inc. reproduced the book as part of its 1992 Annual Report. The report noted "Haunted House was first published in 1979, and has sold 1,083,366 copies, in 13 languages, to nearly 30 countries worldwide."

Pieńkowski had a lifelong interest in stage design. He was commissioned to provide designs for Théâtre de Complicité, Beauty and the Beast for the Royal Ballet, and Sleeping Beauty at Disneyland Paris.

In December 2008 he was a guest on Private Passions, a biographic music discussion programme on BBC Radio 3. Published episode notes include the observation that "[h]is musical choices, which all have strong personal resonances, reflect his Polish background as well as his love of both Italy and England." Recordings of two Polish numbers led the program: "Infant holy, infant lowly", a traditional Christmas Carol (lyrics in English translation), and Chopin's so-called Military Polonaise.

In 2019, Pienkowski was awarded the Booktrust's Lifetime Achievement Award.

== Personal life and death ==
In October 2009, Pieńkowski was a guest on BBC Radio 4's Desert Island Discs. During the programme he discussed his childhood spent roaming Europe, his dead infant sister, his bipolarity and his collection of discarded garments (which he would wear himself or give away to charity shops).

He also talked about his 40-year relationship with his collaborator and civil partner, David Walser, whom he met in a pub on the King's Road in West London. They contracted their partnership in Richmond on the first day this was possible in 2005.

Pieńkowski lived and worked in Barnes, London, where he was a patron of the Barnes Literary Society.

Pieńkowski died from pneumonia at Charing Cross Hospital in Fulham, London, on 19 February 2022, aged 85. At the time of his death, he was also suffering from metastatic prostate cancer and Alzheimer's dementia.

== The Booker Prize trophy ==
In 1969, Pieńkowski designed a trophy for the Booker Prize, which was unveiled at the first prize ceremony that year, with the statuette being awarded to P. H. Newby. Although the statuette was out of use for many years, after Pieńkowski's death it was reinstated in his honour and was awarded to the winner of the Booker Prize 2022, Shehan Karunatilaka.

== Books ==
- Annie, Bridget and Charlie (1967)
- The Golden Bird (1972)
- ABC
- ABC Dinosaurs (1993)
- Haunted House Intervisual Books
- Easter
- Christmas
- The First Christmas
- The First Noel
- Weather
- Gossip
- Botticelli's Bed & Breakfast
- Little Monsters
- Shapes
- Numbers
- Boats
- Faces
- 1 2 3
- Big Machines
- Doorbell
- Dinner Times
- Meg and Mog
- Meg on the Moon
- Meg and the Romans
- The Fairytales
- Nighttime
- Pet Food
- Small Talk
- Oh My a Fly
- Yes No
- Robot
- Road Hog
- The Animals Went in Two by Two
- Pizza
