= Nick Wilton =

English actor and scriptwriter

Nicholas Wilton
- Born: 8 March 1957 (age 69); Stalham, Norfolk, England
- Occupation: Actor
- Years active: 1971–present
- Notable work: Carrott's Lib; Jackanory; EastEnders
- Spouse(s): Julie Dawn Cole (m. 1991; div. 2002) Lynette McMorrough (m. 2006)
- Children: 2
- Website: www.nickwilton.com

Nicholas Wilton (born 8 March 1957) is a British actor and scriptwriter. He has appeared as Mr Lister in the BBC soap opera EastEnders as a recurring character; he has also appeared in Carrott's Lib and Jackanory.

== Early life ==
Wilton studied English and Drama at the University of Kent. His first professional engagement was in 1979 as a bluecoat entertainer at a Pontins holiday camp. He then spent two years as a stage manager in theatres, before moving into acting.

== Career ==
=== Acting ===
Wilton made his acting debut in 1980 in the Whitehall farce Simple Spymen, directed by Brian Rix, and went on to play opposite Rix in the West End revival of Dry Rot at the Lyric Theatre, Shaftesbury Avenue in 1988. He has appeared in many television shows, such as the BBC soap opera EastEnders, Doctors (twice), Casualty, Heartbeat, The Bill (three times), Carrott's Lib (two series and Election Specials), The Omid Djalili Show and the children's show Scoop. He appeared as a guest in My Dad's the Prime Minister, No. 73 (five series), Saturday Superstore as Mo the Crow and as Mr Seagrove for 11 episodes in Big Meg, Little Meg. He was also a writer and performer for the children's sketch show Fast Forward for 19 episodes between 1984 and 1987.

He has appeared in many stage productions, such as Michael Cooney's play Cash on Delivery at the Whitehall Theatre (now Trafalgar Studios), directed by Ray Cooney, and Tom, Dick and Harry, as well as The Railway Children, playing Mr Perks in four UK tours. On radio, he appeared in and wrote for In One Ear (3 series), Son of Cliché (2 series), Cover to Cover, Aspects of the Fringe and The Story So Far. He has written dialogue and provided voices for exhibitions at the London Transport Museum; presented the comedy channel for Emirates and SriLankan Airlines from 1998 to 2010, and made a recording of Ricky Gervais's biography, The Story So Far. In the late eighties, he also performed cabaret.

Since 2000 he has appeared as Pantomime dame every Christmas. In 2011, he appeared in a Specsavers advert alongside chef Gordon Ramsay. The following year, he was cast in the film version of Ray Cooney's farce Run for Your Wife. Wilton has also starred in international stage productions such as No Sex Please - We're British, produced by the British Theatre Playhouse in Singapore and Kuala Lumpur in May 2015, and A Bedfull of Foreigners, produced by the same company in Singapore and Kuala Lumpur in September 2006.

=== Scriptwriting ===
Wilton is also a scriptwriter and has written for Three of a Kind, Play Away, In One Ear (three series), The Smith and Jones Sketchbook, Smack the Pony, WYSIWYG and wrote one episode of Jackanory. In 1982 he also wrote a sketch for the television film The Funny Side of Christmas. In 1987 he wrote an episode for The Les Dennis Laughter Show and in 1984 he wrote four episodes of Spitting Image. Wilton also wrote for Not the Nine O'Clock News, A Kick Up the Eighties and the TV series Alas Smith and Jones.

=== Pantomime ===
He first performed in pantomime in 1987 and as a dame every Christmas since 2000.

Year	Show	Theatre	Ref.
1987	Dick Whittington	Theatre Royal, Plymouth	
1991	Aladdin	Millfield Theatre, Edmonton	
2000	Robin Hood & Babes in the Wood	Salisbury Playhouse	
2001	Jack and the Beanstalk	Queen's Theatre, Hornchurch	
2002	Mother Goose	Connaught Theatre, Worthing	
2003	Aladdin	Connaught Theatre, Worthing	
2004	Snow White and the Seven Dwarfs	Connaught Theatre, Worthing	
2005	Dick Whittington	Kenneth More Theatre, Ilford	
2006	Dick Whittington	Theatre Rhyl	
2007	Jack & the Beanstalk	Hull New Theatre	
2008	Aladdin	Festival Theatre, Malvern	
2009	Snow White	The Playhouse, Weston-super-Mare	
2017	Snow White and the Seven Dwarfs	Theatre Royal, Bath	
2018	Beauty and the Beast	Grand Theatre, Blackpool	
2019	Beauty and The Beast	Theatre Royal, Bath	
2022	Aladdin	Theatre Royal, Bath	
2023	Sleeping Beauty	Theatre Royal, Bath	
2024	Snow White and the Seven Dwarfs	Theatre Royal, Bath	
2025	Jack and the Beanstalk	Malvern Theatres, Malvern	

== Awards and nominations ==
Wilton was nominated for the Perrier Award alongside his revue group, Writers Inc and won in 1982. He was in the "Carrott's Lib" team that won the BAFTA for Best Light Entertainment programme in 1983. On radio he was in the two Sony Award-winning comedy series Son of Cliché (best comedy 1984), with Chris Barrie and Nick Maloney, which was written by Red Dwarf creators Rob Grant and Doug Naylor, and In One Ear (best comedy 1985) with Clive Mantle, Helen Lederer and Steve Brown, produced by Jamie Rix.

== Personal life ==
Wilton was married to Julie Dawn Cole, with whom he has two children. He later married actress Lynette McMorrough.

== Filmography ==
Films
Year	Title	Role	Ref.
2012	Run for Your Wife	Taxi driver	
2013	Off the Aisle	Freddie Baker	

Television
Year	Title	Role	Notes
1983	Three of a Kind	Unnamed	1 episode
1982–1983	Carrott's Lib	Unnamed	17 episodes
1982–1987	Saturday Superstore	Mo the Crow	5 series
198?	Micro Live	Unnamed	1 episode
1984	Play Away	Himself	4 episodes
1984	No. 73	Tony Deal	10 episodes
1984–1987	Fast Forward	Himself	19 episodes
1985	Glamour Night	Dave	episode: "Summer Season"
1987	Hello Mum	Various Roles	6 episodes
1987	Hardwicke House	Peter Philpott	2 episodes
1988	Comic Relief	Himself	TV special
1988	Valentine Park	Gerald	episode: "Where Have All the Flowers Gone?"
1988	Colin's Sandwich	Postman	episode: "Back from Bengal"
1990–1993	Jackanory	Storyteller / Martins Mice	10 episodes
199?	The 10 Percenters	Harry Shales	episode: "Libel"
1995	The Bill	Barry Pringle	episode: "A Year and a Day"
1995	The Plant	Rory	TV movie
1997	Paul Merton in Galton and Simpson's	Reporter	episode: "The Clerical Error"
1998	Noah's Ark	Kenny Fisher	episode: "Killing Time"
1998	Duck Patrol	John Able	episode: "The Siege of Mallory Wharf"
1999	The Jim Tavaré Show	Scott	1 episode
1999	The Bill	Roger Carlson	episode: "Long Term Investment"
2000	The Thing About Vince	Mr Rogers	Miniseries, 1 episode
2000–2001	Big Meg, Little Meg	Mr Seagrove	11 episodes
2004	The Bill	Mr. Turner	episode: "242: Suicidal Thoughts"
2004	My Dad's the Prime Minister	Banker	episode: "Marathoin"
2005	Casualty	Robert Bewleigh	episode: "Fat Chance"
2006	Heartbeat	Derek Taylor	episode: "Great Expectations"
2007	Bonkers	Client	1 episode
2008	Nuzzle and Scratch	Mr Squeaky / Launderette Man	episode: "Launderette"
2008–2013, 2016–2018, 2020–2022, 2024	EastEnders	Mr Lister	Recurring role
2009	The Omid Djalili Show	Hugh	1 episode
2009, 2010	Scoop	Paulo, Rex de Lacey	2 episodes
2010, 2012	Doctors	Milo Millard, Nigel Cushing	2 episodes
2023	Dreamland	Doctor Beany	1 episode

Radio
Title
Son of Cliché
In One Ear
Week-Ending
Semi-Circles
Fetlock P.I.
The Story So Far
Cinderella
Puss In Boots
Peter Claytons Nightcap
Aspects of a Fringe
Uncle Charlie
Cover to Cover

Writer
Year	Title	Notes
1979	Not the Nine O'Clock News	not defined
1981	Three of a Kind	8 episodes
1981	A Kick Up the Eighties	not defined
1984	Alas Smith and Jones	not defined
1984	Spitting Image	4 episodes
1987	Hello Mum	6 episodes
1987	The Les Dennis Laughter Show	1 episode
1991	Jackanory	1 episode
1992	WYSIWYG	not defined (only writer credited, played eponymous character)
1999	Smack the Pony	1 episode
2006	The Smith & Jones Sketchbook	3 episodes

Online
Year	Title	Notes
2020	Pantomonium	Online pantomime due to lockdown
