= Stoneybridge =

Village on South Uist island, Scotland

Coordinates: 57.272°N 7.395°W

Stoneybridge: Scottish Gaelic: Staoinebrig
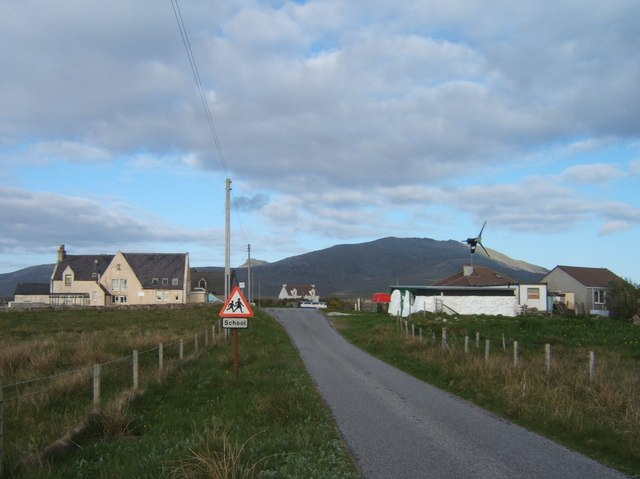
- The school in Stoneybridge

- Location within the Outer Hebrides
- Language: Scottish Gaelic; English
- OS grid reference: NF748330
- Civil parish: South Uist
- Council area: Na h-Eileanan Siar
- Lieutenancy area: Western Isles
- Country: Scotland
- Sovereign state: United Kingdom
- Post town: ISLE OF SOUTH UIST
- Postcode district: HS8
- Dialling code: 01870
- Police: Scotland
- Fire: Scottish
- Ambulance: Scottish
- UK Parliament: Na h-Eileanan an Iar
- Scottish Parliament: Na h-Eileanan an Iar

Stoneybridge (Scottish Gaelic: Staoinebrig) is a village on the island of South Uist in Scotland. The Crois Chnoca Breaca standing stone is situated to the west of the village. Stoneybridge is within the parish of South Uist and the chapel was also situated west of the settlement at Ardmichael, having been in existence prior to 1854. The burial ground is still present at the site.

The Scottish comedy series Absolutely used the name for a village in a recurring sketch, satirising local politics and the petty Bonapartism of local council leaders. The cast were unaware of the existence of a real Stoneybridge when writing the original scripts, and the Stoneybridge in the show is described as being near the Yetts o' Muckhart, placing it in Clackmannanshire (although Breich was used as the location for filming exterior shots).

== Access to Stoneybridge ==
A small country road branching from the A865 leads into Stoneybridge and past Loch Ollay before rejoining with the A865.
