= Helen Nicoll =

English children's author (1937–2012)

- Born: 10 October 1937; Natland, Westmorland (now Cumbria), England
- Died: 30 September 2012 (aged 74); Marlborough, Wiltshire, England
- Education: Badminton School; Dartington Hall
- Occupation: Writer
- Spouse: Robert Kime (m. 1970)
- Writing career
- Genre: Children's fantasy novels
- Notable work: Meg and Mog series

Helen Nicoll (10 October 1937 – 30 September 2012) was an English author of children's literature, best known for the Meg and Mog series. She wrote a total of 17 books and collaborated with illustrator Jan Pienkowski for more than forty years. In 1983, she founded the audiobook company Cover to Cover, which was acquired by BBC Worldwide in 2000.

== Biography ==
She was educated at Blackwell and later at Badminton School in Bristol. She then studied the violin for a year at Dartington Hall in Devon.

== Personal life ==
Nicoll married Robert Kime, an interior designer and antique dealer, in 1970. They had two children.

Nicoll died at her home in Wiltshire on 30 September 2012, aged 74.
