= Son of Cliché =

Radio sketch comedy show

- Genre: Sketch comedy
- Running time: 30 minutes
- Country of origin: United Kingdom
- Language: English
- Home station: BBC Radio 4
- Syndicates: BBC Radio 4 Extra
- Starring: Chris Barrie; Nick Maloney; Nick Wilton
- Written by: Rob Grant; Doug Naylor
- Produced by: Alan Nixon
- Recording studio: Paris Studio
- Original release: 23 August 1983 – 29 December 1984
- No. of series: 2
- No. of episodes: 16
- Audio format: Stereophonic sound
- Website: www.bbc.co.uk/programmes/b00p36hd

Son of Cliché is a comedy sketch show that ran for two series on BBC Radio 4 between 23 August 1983 and 29 December 1984.

The sketches were written by Rob Grant and Doug Naylor, and were performed by Chris Barrie, Nick Maloney, Nick Wilton, and in the penultimate episode of the second series, guest performer Paul B. Davies, with music by Peter Brewis. The series was a follow-up to Grant and Naylor's 1981 series Cliché, which Maloney had also featured in.

One of the recurring sketches from the second series of the show, Dave Hollins Space Cadet, formed the basis for the BBC Two TV sci-fi comedy Red Dwarf, which Grant and Naylor also scripted and in which Barrie starred.

== Dave Hollins: Space Cadet ==
Dave Hollins: Space Cadet was a series of five sketches that aired as part of the series.

The sketches recounted the adventures of Dave Hollins (voiced by Nick Wilton), a hapless space traveller who is marooned in space far from Earth. His only steady companion is the computer Hab (voiced by Chris Barrie).

Grant and Naylor chose to use the Dave Hollins: Space Cadet sketches as the basis for a television show after watching the 1974 film Dark Star. They changed some elements from the sketches:

The seven-trillion-year figure was first changed to seven billion years, and then to three million, and the characters of Arnold Rimmer and the Cat were created. The name Dave Hollins was changed to Dave Lister when a football player called Dave Hollins became well known, and Hab was replaced by Holly. Chris Barrie, one of the voice actors, went on to portray Arnold Rimmer in the Red Dwarf TV show.

Episodes of Dave Hollins can be found on the two-disc Red Dwarf DVD sets starting with Series V and ending with Series VIII.
