= Matt King (comedian) =

British actor, comedian and writer

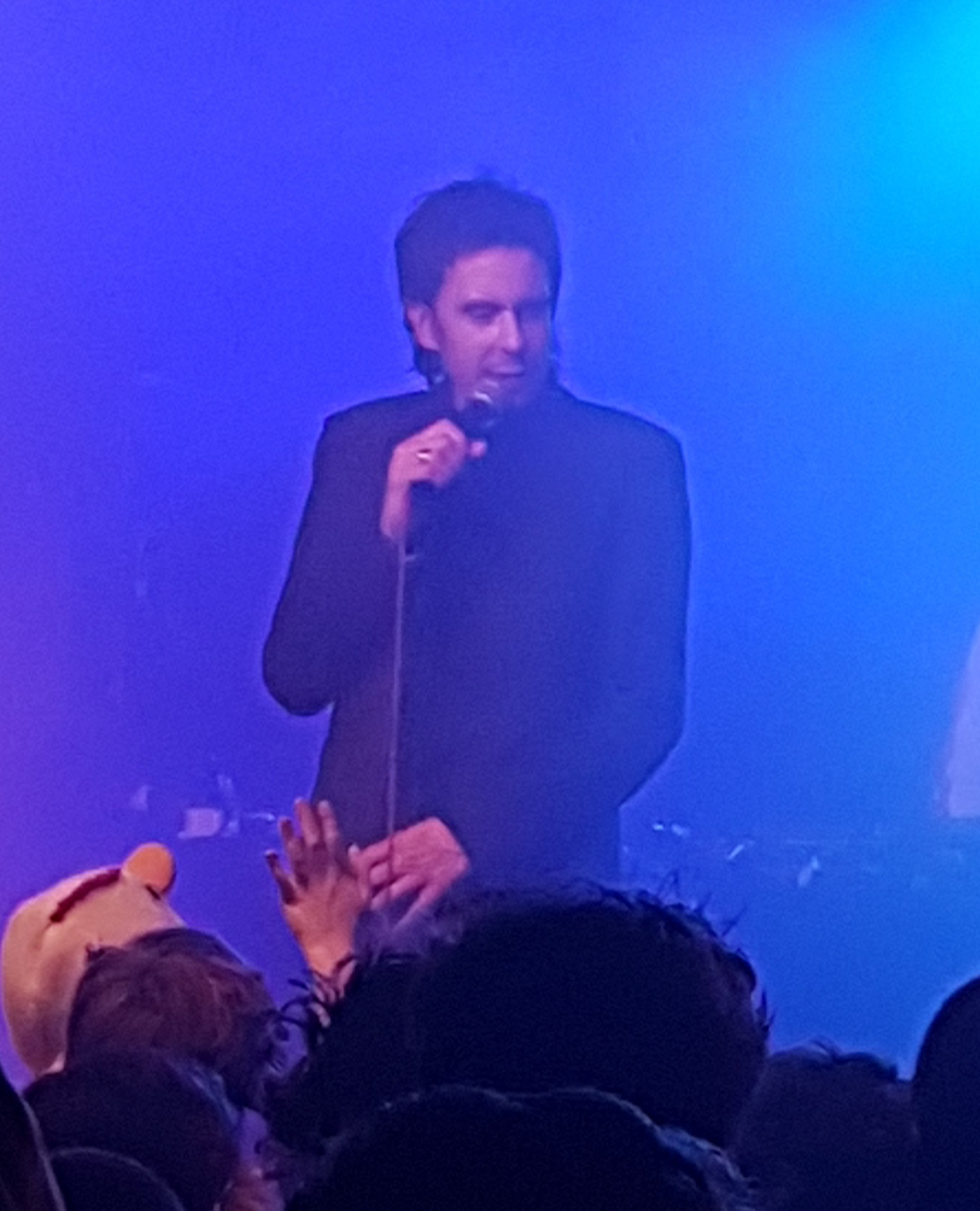
- King in 2016
- Born: 31 January 1968 (age 58); Watford, Hertfordshire, England
- Occupations: Actor; comedian

Matt King (born 31 January 1968) is an English actor, DJ and comedian. He is best known for his role as Super Hans in the British sitcom Peep Show.

== Early life ==
King was born in Watford, Hertfordshire, England on 31 January 1968 and attended Cheshunt School. He moved to Australia at age 20 where he worked as a chef before meeting Jimeoin McKeown. McKeown suggested that King become a stand-up comedian. King worked in the Australian comedy circuit for 15 years before returning to the UK.

== Career ==
As an actor he has played many characters, including Elton John and Terry Venables in the BAFTA-nominated comedy series Star Stories, and also starring in his own self-penned sketch show Dogface.

His role as Super Hans in Peep Show spanned more than a decade. He has performed DJ sets in-character as Super Hans.

He has appeared in cult comedy series Look Around You, and in the third series of Skins, playing Cook's father, a character very similar to Super Hans. He co-starred in the film Inkheart, appeared in the Guy Ritchie film Rocknrolla, and the British film Bronson, and had a lead role in the fantasy thriller Malice in Wonderland. He also appeared in the third series of Doctor Who and as Peter Streete in "The Shakespeare Code", and was a regular playing computer expert Freeman in the BBC production Jekyll.

As a stand-up comedian he has appeared at the Edinburgh Festival, and at the Melbourne International Comedy Festival.

King played a mad scientist in a 2007 commercial promoting a newly customizable credit card by Capital One.

In 2010 he played driver and bodyguard to Ray Winstone's character Rob Gant in London Boulevard alongside Colin Farrell and Keira Knightley. In the same year he co-wrote the BBC2 series Whites starring Alan Davies.

In 2010-2011, King starred in the Australian supernatural comedy-drama series Spirited, in which he plays the ghost of 1980s rock star Henry Mallet. He also stars in the Sky One generational family comedy drama, Starlings, co-written with Steve Edge and produced by Steve Coogan.

In 2013, King appeared in the final episode of The IT Crowd as Raymond Peterfellow. In 2015, he narrated the audiobook The Hunt for the Mayor of Smoochyville, written by writer and musician Chris Wade. In 2017, he appeared as Phil Hendricks in the BBC drama In the Dark.

During the Xbox Showcase in June 2024, King was revealed to be playing Humphry in the 2026 Fable reboot.

In October 2025, King appeared in the music video for the song "Fundraiser" by Bar Italia.

In November 2025, it was announced, alongside four other members of the main Peep Show cast, that King would feature as a guest star on Channel 4's The Great British Bake Off Christmas Edition.

== In the media ==
In 2024, King announced he was leaving X/Twitter, calling out Elon Musk after he stumbled across a disturbing video shared with the website. He directed his followers instead to his accounts on Instagram, Threads and the relatively new social media network Bluesky.

== Personal life ==
He is a fan of Tottenham Hotspur, as is his character on Peep Show.

In 2026, King suffered a stroke that left him paralysed, however after a visit to the Royal Sussex County Hospital, he regained his ability to walk.

== Filmography ==
=== Film ===
Year	Title	Role	Notes
1999	The Craic	English Guy	
2008	Rocknrolla	Cookie	
2008	Bronson	Paul Daniels	
2008	Inkheart	Cockerell	
2009	Father	Mitch's Father	Short film
2009	Malice in Wonderland	Gonzo	
2010	Made in Dagenham	Trevor Innes	
2010	London Boulevard	Fletcher	
2012	Physics	Les	Short film
2014	Gregor	Terry	
2014	Paddington	Andre the Thief	
2014	Get Santa	Brian	
2015	White City	George Bowlby	Television film
2016	Zombie Spring Breakers	Karl	
2018	Juliet, Naked	Mark	

=== Television ===
Year	Title	Role	Notes
2000–2001	Something in the Air	Rollo the Chauffeur	14 episodes
2002	Look Around You	Telephone Engineer	Episode: "The Brain"
2003–2015	Peep Show	Super Hans	36 episodes
2006	Comedy Lab	Seb	Episode: "FM"
2006	Star Stories	Terry Venables, Elton John, Guy Ritchie, Gary Kemp	4 episodes
2007	Coming Up	Tony	Episode: "Brussels"
2007	Doctor Who	Peter Streete	Episode: "The Shakespeare Code"
2007	Jekyll	Freeman	4 episodes
2007	Dogface	Various	5 episodes
2007	The Bill	Greg Peters	Episode: "Stealth Attack"
2008	City of Vice	Salt	Episode: "Episode #1.5"
2009	Skins	Cook Senior	Episode: "Finale"
2009	The Increasingly Poor Decisions of Todd Margaret	Taxi Driver	Episode: "Pilot"
2010	Whites	Melvin	4 episodes
2010–2011	Spirited	Henry Mallet	18 episodes
2012–2013	Starlings	Uncle Loz	12 episodes
2013	The IT Crowd	Raymond Peterfellow	Episode: "The Internet Is Coming"
2013	Still Reeling	Les	
2014	Strange Hill High	Mr. Creeper (voice)	4 episodes
2017	In the Dark	Phil Hendricks	4 episodes
2017	The End of the F***ing World	DC Eddie Onslow	Episode: "Episode #1.5"
2018	Strike	Jeff Whittaker	2 episodes
2018	Chris P. Duck	Roger (voice)	6 episodes
2020	Death in Paradise	Terry Minto	Episode: "A Murder in Portrait"
2020	Bulletproof	Matlock	Episode: "Episode #2.4"
2022	Rick and Morty	Knight of the Sun (voice)	Episode: "A Rick in King Mortur's Mort"
2024	Time Bandits	De Plume	Episode: "Medieval"
2024	Spent	Mills	4 episodes
2025	The Great Christmas Bake Off	Himself	Peep Show Cast Christmas special

=== Video games ===
Year	Title	Role	Notes
2008	Call of Duty: World at War – Final Fronts		
2027	Fable	Humphry	
