= Dogface (TV series) =

- Genre: Sketch comedy
- Starring: Matt King; Catherine Shepherd; Kevin Bishop; Jo Neary; Steve Edge; Renton Skinner
- Opening theme: "I Don't Wanna Be a Millionaire" By The Aches
- Country of origin: United Kingdom
- Original language: English

Production
- Running time: 25 minutes
- Production company: Objective Productions

Original release
- Network: E4
- Release: 9 September 2007

Dogface is a British sketch comedy television series which debuted on E4 in September 2007. The show consists of sketches sometimes interspersed with animations featuring dogs sitting at tables talking as "lads" talk, with much reference to booze, birds and other lad culture stereotypes. The series is produced by Objective Productions.
