= List of Absolutely episodes =

Episodes of the British sketch comedy television programme

The following is a list of episodes from the Channel 4 sketch comedy television programme Absolutely.

== Episodes ==
=== Series 1 (1989) ===
All episodes were shown on Tuesday nights at 11:00 pm on Channel 4 and ran for 45 minutes.

#	Broadcast date	List of sketches
1	23 May 1989	* Radical Television * Opening titles * Job Interview – The First Candidate * Denzil – Do It Yourself * Job Interview – Bass Guitar * Ordering a pizza * Don & George – Undertakers * 'Journey of Life' (song) * Don & George – Undertakers * Adverts * Don & George – Undertakers * Little Girl – Death * Bert Bastard – Address Book * Adverts * Calum Gilhooley – Visiting John * Fashion Show * Getting to Work Seminar * Nice Family – The evening's television * Closing Credits
2	30 May 1989	* Jack meets Valerie Jane Turpett * Opening titles * Cinema sketch (featuring Calum Gilhooley) * 'Just an Ordinary Guy' (song) * Adverts * Little Girl – The Queen * Nice Family – Death of a Hamster * Don & George – Hamster Cage * Adverts * Don & George – Hamster Cage * Death * Questions at an American Immigration Desk * Death * Bert Bastard – Rowing Boat * Denzil & Gwynedd * The Commisionaire – Taxi * Closing Credits
3	6 June 1989	* Announcement of Herbert Blackford's Death * Opening Titles * Shop prepares for The Queen's visit * Don & George – Shop * Man trapped in pile of newspaper supplements * Firemen * Adverts * Firemen * Nice Family – Writing to Points of View * Don & George – Shop * Courtroom scene – dentist and clown * Little Girl – Birth * Adverts * Bert Bastard – House Fire * Firemen * Long-winded interview with theatre actress * Hospital scene * Shop prepares for The Queen's visit – includes 'She's The Queen' (song) and closing credits
4	13 June 1989	* Bank – cashing a cheque * Opening titles * Billy – Sweet shop * Vikings scene * Don & George – Bargains * Adverts * The Foot Theatre Company * The Beginnings of Scottish Country Dancing * Robin & Annabel – Supermarket * Opera scene * Denzil & Gwynedd – Cheese Water * Opera scene * Nice Family – Christmas presents * Closing credits * Vikings scene
5	20 June 1989	* Little Girl – People in power * Opening titles * Gwyn – Shop * Scottish Junior Cup Quarter Final Draw * Businessmen in cafe * The Greensleeves Dance * Adverts * Bad Actress' acting lessons * Being A Hippy * Clothes Shop * Adverts * Slobs in a living room * Posh people in cinema * Becoming A Beefeater * Closing Credits * Suspicious Salesman
6	27 June 1989	* Animal rights activists * Opening titles * Bert Bastard – Deckchair * Stoneybridge – Promotional video/slogans/jingles * 'The Shape I'm In' (song) * Bert Bastard – Deckchair * Gwyn – Courtroom * Little Girl – Christmas and Jesus * Calum Gilhooley – Post Office * Adverts * Two shy men at a party * Bert Bastard – Deckchair * Nice Family – Morning Mail * The Salvation Army * Bert Bastard – Deckchair * Closing Credits

=== Series 2 (1990) ===
All episodes were shown on Wednesday nights at 10:00pm on Channel 4 and ran for 45 minutes.

#	Broadcast date	List of sketches
1	22 August 1990	* Opening titles *Protest – 'We're quite comfortably off'/'We don't know * Don & George * Gwyn * Don & George – Buying Wallpaper and Sofa * Shop salesmen runs to the next sketch * Doctor sketch * Shop salesman runs back from Doctor sketch to Don & George sketch * Don & George – Buying a Sofa * Board meeting with stunt doubles * Adverts * Putting Children To Use * Gwyn * Partings – how to get on in life * Old lady's driving test – identifying road signs * Ransom tape * Don & George – Buying a Sofa * Gwyn * The Commissionaire – Explosive Postcard * Adverts * Queen's Inspection * Dinner Party – Regards * Gwyn * Little Girl – Having a Baby * Nice Family – Travel agent * Closing credits
2	29 August 1990	* Opening titles * Calum Gilhooley – Meeting Jehovah's Witnesses * The Great Thinko * Billy – Shop * Calum Gilhooley – Undeveloped Photos * Taxi driver * Life Support * Calum Gilhooley – Punch * Adverts * Mr. Perkins and Mr. Perkins * Police housecall (including Calum Gilhooley) * Fashion Show – Priests in Pants * Mr. Perkins and Mr. Perkins * Old Artist and Nude Model * Mr. Perkins and Mr. Perkins; *Adverts * Denzil and Gwynedd – Expecting a Baby (including Calum Gilhooley) * 'I Wanna Have a Baby' (song) * Calum Gilhooley – Railway Station * Don & George – Crossants; *Closing credits
3	5 September 1990	* Opening titles * Disease of the Week – Thrumble Nose * Don & George – Don returns from London * Tour Guide * What do fish talk about? * Billy – Football * Adverts * Macglashan – Inventions * Army – Antique furniture * Macglashan – World Cup Draws * Little Girl – Telephone * Macglashan – Joke * Adverts * Macglashan – Scottish Frogs * 'Sensible Hair' (song) * Hair for Mice * Airport – Tour Guide * Airport – The Commissionaire * Airport – Macglashan * Squash changing rooms – Tour Guide * Squash changing rooms – Lawyers with long names * Closing credits
4	12 September 1990	* Opening titles * The Wells – Jeffrey * Stoneybridge – Olympic Games bid video/Stoneybridge Highland Games bid jingles * Gwyn – Nouns and verbs * Bible translation problems * Gwyn * Piano Man – 'Clever' (song) * Adverts * Bert Bastard – Dinner * Fun as a Nun * Dangerous things can be dangerous * Piano Man – 'Trousers' (song) * Gwyn – Anesthetic * Little Girl – Dentist * Piano Man – 'Good Looking' (song) * Dinner party scene * Piano Man – 'Adante' (song) * Vets' waiting room * Piano Man * Adverts * Robin & Annabel – First Meeting * Calum Gilhooley – Phone call * Robin & Annabel – Picnic * Calum Gilhooley – Pub * Closing Credits (Piano Man)
5	19 September 1990	* Opening titles * Obessesion with Frank * Alarm clock problems * Denzil & Gwynedd – Wine * Sleepwalking man * Gwyn – Unpredictable * Waiting room * Adverts * Sleepwalking man * Waiting room * Don & George – Hotel * Waiting room * Childhoods of the cast * Don & George – Hotel * Sleepwalking man * Western film dubbing * Little Girl – Lies * Baby christening * Courtroom scene * 'Wearing a Suit' (song) * Sleepwalking man * Closing credits (with jeering audience)
6	26 September 1990	* Opening titles * Denzil & Gwynedd – Illtyd * Shortest link in the world * Apologies * Little Girl – Aeroplanes * Nice Family – Drive * Adverts * Courtroom baby * Apologies * Talking to a sheepdog * Apologies * Western bar scene * Surgeons – All Things Bright and Beautiful * Sheepdog in pub * Adverts * Bert Bastard – Game * Don & George – Soup * Model's makeup * Apologies * Stoneybridge – Twin town promotional video * Closing credits
7	3 October 1990	* Western Bar * Opening titles * Wako-taki * Man in park * Bowling Club Annual General Meeting * Billy – Suicide and Shop * Adverts * I'm not here * Man with Diaries * I'm not here * Adolescent girl * I'm not here * How to attract ladies (including Calum Gilhooley) * Adverts * Robin and Annabel – Wedding * Car mechanics * How to attract ladies * Nice Family – Bondage * Closing credits
8	12 October 1990	* Casting * Opening titles * Old People's Home * Relationship with camera * Art gallery * Don & George – Dating * Adverts * Little Girl – Buildings * Businessman's phones * Don & George – Dating * Advert * Bert Bastard – Suicide note * Calum Gilhooley – Courtroom * Simple Minds spoof song * Closing credits

=== Series 3 (1991) ===
All episodes were shown on Friday nights at 10:30pm on Channel 4 and ran for 35 minutes.

#	Broadcast date	List of sketches
1	17 May 1991	* Opening titles * Calum Gilhooley – Aeroplane * The Wells – Letter to prisoner * Bert Bastard – Sports Day * Don & George – Police * Adverts * Don & George – Police * Stoneybridge – Business promotional 'vido' * Little Girl – Doctors * Macglashan – Hurly Burly Bag * Bad morning animation * Macglashan – The English Border * Closing credits
2	24 May 1991	* Opening titles * Don & George – Medical * Very Bad Swimmers Indeed * Car alarm revenge * Denzil & Gwynedd – Lecture * Tour Guide * Clive Merson – Dead man's charity work * Adverts * Restaurant – order * Lobster run over by car * Gwyn * Restaurant – running out of food * Systems Analysts fan in Nightclub * 'Systems Analysts' (song) * On the Lavatory with Frank Hovis – Taxi * Plumbers * Closing credits
3	31 May 1991	* Opening titles * The Wells – Preparing for visitors * Calum Gilhooley – Booking a flight * Bert Bastard – Supermarket * 'Life Ain't Nothing Compared to Death' (song) * Adverts * Jeff The Parkie * Tamzin The Model * Don & George – Satellite Television * Posh couple – 'Binki' * Don & George – Broken mirror (including Gwyn) * Stoneybridge – Council elections * Closing credits
4	7 June 1991	* Opening titles * Denzil & Gwynedd – Birthday * Piano Man * Seance * On The Lavatory with Frank Hovis – Greek holiday * Vets' waiting room * Wedding Preparation * Piano Man * Adverts * Wedding video * Hotel restaurant – dress code * Piano Man Underwater * Hotel – Bed * Poets at funeral * Hotel – Noise Next Door/Burglar * Police – Playground * Police siege on house * Closing credits
5	14 June 1991	* Opening titles * Charity shop sketch * Braid Scots phrases * Singing Man * Stoneybridge – Independent Television franchise * Singing Man * Calum Gilhooley – Opinion poll * Opinion Poll * Bert Bastard – Over 80s Disco * Singing Man * Adverts * Nice Family – Football Rules * Little Girl – School * Hospital sketch * Denzil & Gwynedd – Illtyd * Macglashan – Speech * Blind charity man * Macglashan – New laws * Closing credits
6	21 June 1991	* Opening titles * Wellses – Christmas Presents * Stoneybridge – Annual Dinner Dance awards * Train Station preacher * Stoneybridge – Annual Dinner Dance performance * Einstein's Banana Skin * Billy – Bedroom * Stoneybridge – Annual Dinner Dance (including Frank Hovis) * Adverts * Mime artists * Deal in a car park * Bad Edwardian entertainer * Stoneybridge – Annual dinner dance comedian * Don and George – Names * TV critic * Stoneybridge – Annual Dinner Dance, includes The Hills of Buccleuch (song) * Closing credits
7	28 June 1991	* Opening titles * Macglashan – News and Sport * Denzil & Gwynedd – Codfyl * Piano Man – Restaurant * Aeroplane staff * On The Lavatory with Frank Hovis – Wife * Adverts * Mad woman – cutting your own hair * Courtroom – World Baseball Champions * Party animation * University student's letter * Don & George – Corner shop * Mad woman – making your own clothes * Elvis fan club * Denzil & Gwynedd – Dancing * Elvis fan club * Closing credits
8	5 July 1991	* Wells – Charity shop * Stoneybridge – Jamboree Celebrity * Environmentalist song * On The Lavatory with Frank Hovis – 'Penis Flytrap' * Don & George – 'George, You're Simply the Best' * Bert Bastard – Hokey Cokey * Victoria and Albert Museum * Piano Man * Calum Gilhooley – Video Shop * Little Girl – Family * Disastrous family ancestors sketch * Closing credits – including 'I Guess It's Just Pretend' (song)

=== Series 4 (1993) ===
All episodes were shown on Friday nights at 10:30pm on Channel 4 and ran for 35 minutes.

#	Broadcast date	List of sketches
1	22 January 1993	* Opening titles * Macglashan – Newspaper * Laughing Man – Tractor * Calum Gilhooley – Operation * Bert Bastard – World atlas * Laughing Man * Little Girl – Old People * Dressage without the Horses * Adverts * Photographer * On The Lavatory with Frank Hovis – Running for a Bus * Piano Man – Restaurant * Don & George – Work * Laughing Man * Nice Family – Losing It * Closing Credits
2	29 January 1993	* Opening titles * Stoneybridge – Stag night * The Wells – Fostering * Suregons – Tyre Puncture * Office sketch * Gwyn – Razor * Golf – Cyberman vs Thor * Adverts * 'Hello' (song) * Denzil & Gwynedd – Llandudno Neck * Piano Man * Tour Guide – Blenheim Palace * Wedding dress – frills * Closing Credits
3	5 February 1993	* Opening titles * Posh Couple – dinner * Laughing Man – Pub * Don & George – Not selling anything * 'Packed lunch' (song) * Don & George – Not selling anything * On The Lavatory with Frank Hovis – Lip salve * Laughing Man – Pub * Adverts * Bert Bastard – Mobility scooter * Thick game show hostess * Nice Family – The Facts of Life * Surgeons – Left-overs operation * Laughing Man * Lady Camilla * Closing credits
4	12 February 1993	* Opening titles * Denzil & Gwynedd – Hoover * 'Getting older' (song) * Calum Gilhooley – Bookshop/Chase * Little Girl – Trains * Adverts * The Wells – Greentours Holidays * Billy and Mate – 'Hospical' * Mr. Wiggy van * Stoneybridge – Independence for Bruceland * Laughing Man – T-shirt * Stoneybridge – War between Bruceland and the other side of the room * Laughing man *Closing credits
5	19 February 1993	* Opening titles * Nice Family – People to avoid and to meet * Redundant cleaner in wardrobe * Fish attacks * The Wells – Soup kitchen * Gwyn – Teeth * Adverts * Tour Guide – Coach * Surgeons – Street Operation * Don and George – Car * Billy and Mate – 'Sexy interclock' * On The Lavatory with Frank Hovis – Cafe meal * 'Bank Holiday' (song) * Closing credits
6	26 February 1993	* Opening titles * Don & George – Savings * 'Schedule-D Man * Gwyn – Sellotape * Don & George – Donan & Georgeman * Bert Bastard – Cup of tea * Posh couple – waking up * Bert Bastard – Cheese and biscuits * Piano Man – 'Just Ask Me' (song) * Don & George – Donan & Georgeman * Adverts * Little Girl – Government * Calum Gilhooley – Directions * On The Lavtory with Frank Hovis – Farting * Stoneybridge – charity pop single * Closing credits
