= Mr Don & Mr George =

1993 British TV sitcom

- Country of origin: United Kingdom
- No. of series: 1
- No. of episodes: 6

Original release
- Network: Channel 4
- Release: 1993

Mr Don & Mr George is a Channel 4 sitcom, featuring two characters from the Scottish comedy sketch show Absolutely. Moray Hunter (Don) and Jack Docherty (George) played two unrelated characters who happened to share a surname (McDiarmid). Hunter and Docherty wrote the series and it was made by their production company, Absolutely Productions. The humour was surreal and often featured ridiculous visual gags and wordplay. A single six-episode series was made, and was first broadcast in the United Kingdom on Channel 4 in 1993.

The series was released on VHS (two tapes, each featuring three episodes) in the 1990s. A single VHS tape was released with all six episodes on as well. This tape stated that it had the entire first series on one tape; however, no further series were made.

== Episodes ==
No.	Title	Original release date
1	"You Can Run.... But You Can't Hide Your Legs"	25 August 1993
Armed with a matchbox full of 34 deadly sulphur guns, Don and George set out on a deadly post-cold-war mission - to find someone to spy on.
2	"The Winslow Apple"	1 September 1993
The police net closes in on Don, following his theft of an apple as a child. George is so tense he is in danger of exploding. A holiday not to Switzerland is the only answer.
3	"There's Been a Thing"	8 September 1993
Don has fallen for Miss Burns the air hostess. Naturally, George tries to have his friend arrested for conspiring to go out on a date. A tale of love, jealousy and trembling lower lips.
4	"You've Eaten My Future"	15 September 1993
Don strikes a lucrative business deal with the Ecuadorean government. One problem. Don & George don't have a business. However, they do have two hundred boxes of cornflakes, enough to build a splendid office.
5	"No Wasps"	22 September 1993
George is going to pieces, drinking three bottles of whisky a day. Don, and a mysterious approach from Hollywood, convince George to get fit. Just in time, coincidentally, for George's boxing match with Dennis "Killer" Bowles.
6	"This is This, Goodbye is Goodbye"	29 September 1993
Don's tenure of friendship with George expires. But Don owes money for the rental of his spectacles, so George has little option but to pawn his friend. Unfortunately, Don is purchased by two former Nazis as a large timepiece.
