= Reluctant Persuaders =

BBC Radio 4 sitcom

- Genre: Situation comedy
- Running time: 30 minutes
- Country of origin: United Kingdom
- Language: English
- Home station: BBC Radio 4
- Starring: Nigel Havers; Josie Lawrence; Mathew Baynton; Rasmus Hardiker; Olivia Nixon; Kieran Hodgson
- Written by: Edward Rowett
- Original release: 15 September 2015 – 6 April 2021
- No. of series: 4
- No. of episodes: 20
- Website: Reluctant Persuaders at BBC Radio 4

Reluctant Persuaders is a BBC Radio 4 sitcom, written by Edward Rowett. It stars Nigel Havers, Josie Lawrence, Mathew Baynton, Rasmus Hardiker, Olivia Nixon and Kieran Hodgson, and was produced by Absolutely Productions. It ran for four series, with a Christmas special, between September 2015 and April 2021.

== Plot ==
Reluctant Persuaders follows Hardacre's, 'the worst advertising agency in London'.

== Cast ==
- Nigel Havers as Rupert Hardacre
- Josie Lawrence as Amanda Brook
- Mathew Baynton as Joe Starling
- Rasmus Hardiker as Teddy (series 1, 3, 4 and Christmas special)
- Kieran Hodgson as Teddy (series 2)
- Olivia Nixon as Laura

== Episodes ==
=== Series One ===
No. in series	Title	Original release date
1	"Lemon"	15 September 2015
London's worst advertising agency plans to re-launch with a guerrilla marketing campaign.
2	"We Try Harder"	22 September 2015
Hardacre enlists Amanda's help to win back one of his old accounts.
3	"The Best A Man Can Get"	29 September 2015
Things are getting desperate for the staff of Hardacre's - the work is not coming in and accounts chief Amanda Brook finds herself reduced to pleading for the business of India.
4	"Vorsprung Durch Technik"	6 October 2015
The team are set to be featured in advertising industry magazine Campaign, but unfortunately the entire staff is trapped in a lift.

=== Series Two ===
No. overall	No. in series	Title	Original release date
5	1	"Live Young"	6 April 2017
6	2	"Just Do It"	13 April 2017
7	3	"Give a Man a Fish"	20 April 2017
8	4	"Think Different"	27 April 2017

=== Series Three ===
No. overall	No. in series	Title	Original release date
9	1	"Ideas For Life"	4 October 2018
10	2	"Happiest Place on Earth"	11 October 2018
11	3	"Connecting People"	18 October 2018
12	4	"Because She's Worth It"	25 October 2018
13	5	"The Appliance of Science"	1 November 2018

=== Special ===
No.	Title	Original release date
14	"Holidays Are Coming"	8 November 2018

=== Series Four ===
No. overall	No. in series	Title	Original release date
15	1	"If You Like A Lot Of Chocolate On Your Biscuit..."	2 March 2021
16	2	"Because Change Happenz"	9 March 2021
17	3	"At Your Side"	16 March 2021
18	4	"Ask The Man Who Owns One"	23 March 2021
19	5	"Have A Break"	30 March 2021
20	6	"Join Our Club"	6 April 2021

== Broadcast history ==
Reluctant Persuaders was originally broadcast on BBC Radio 4. Repeats have since aired on BBC Radio 4 Extra.

== Awards ==
Reluctant Persuaders won the award for Best Scripted Comedy (Studio Audience) at the 2016 BBC Audio Drama Awards.
