= The Cup (TV series) =

British comedy mockumentary, 2008

- Genre: Comedy mockumentary
- Written by: Moray Hunter; Jack Docherty
- Directed by: Matt Lipsey
- Starring: Steve Edge; Jennifer Hennessy; Tanya Franks
- Country of origin: United Kingdom
- Original language: English
- No. of series: 1
- No. of episodes: 6

Production
- Executive producer: Beryl Vertue
- Producer: Sue Vertue
- Editor: Charlie Phillips
- Running time: Approximately 30 minutes
- Production company: Hartswood Films

Original release
- Network: BBC Two
- Release: 21 August – 25 September 2008

Related
- The Tournament

The Cup is a British television programme starring Steve Edge, Pal Aron and Jennifer Hennessy. It is based on the Canadian TV series The Tournament. The show is presented as a mockumentary, and features an Under-11s football team aiming to succeed in a prestigious national tournament – amidst friction between the various parents and club staff.

== Plot outline ==
Terry McConnell is desperate for his 10-year-old son, Malky, to get a trial for Bolton Wanderers – so desperate that Malky misses a training session. And, even though he is joint leading scorer, Malky is dropped from Ashburn United's league decider. Terry moves heaven and earth to persuade coach Tom Blackley to relent and play Malky from the start, but Tom's blood pressure is rising fast, and he soon succumbs to a stroke. McConnell forces club owner Sandra Farrell to allow him to manage, ahead of fellow player dad and gynaecologist Dr. Kaskar, and he leads the team to victory. With Blackley critically ill, the club attempts to organise a benefit for him, while McConnell and Kaskar continue to chase the regular manager's job (each unwilling to be a 'co-coach', and each wanting to get his own son into the team). Farrell instead awards it to the French-born coach at the local school.

Farrell Funeral Directors reveal that they can no longer fund the club's trip to Birmingham for the Under 11's Cup competition. Despite Terry's best attempts to raise money for the trip, they all prove fruitless. He then suggests that they use the money raised for Tom Blackley to fund the trip, an idea previously thrown out by the group of parents; with no other option, they quickly begin to warm to the idea, and take back Tom's money to travel to Birmingham. On the journey there, Terry wonders how he can get the Bolton scout to visit, and decides to take his wife's saved money to book him a room. Despite having stolen the money and later being found out by his wife the scout, Hinchcliff fails to arrive, and rumours that their new French coach is gay generate much excitement, before they are dispelled.

== Characters ==
- Terry McConnell – A former Monkey player whose career ended when he was accidentally tackled in training by Steve Robson (his later boss); he is willing to go to any means to further his son Malky's footballing career even if it means sabotage. He is happily married to the long suffering Janice who often is a part of Terry's plans for Malky. He is often at odds with Dr Kaskar.
- Janice McConnell – Terry's wife, who is often used by Terry to further the career of her son Malky, but Janice also takes an interest in her daughter, Hannah which Terry does rarely. She used to date Steve Robson before she married Terry. She also helps keep Malky's dream of becoming a chef secret from Terry, who finds this out in Episode 3.
- Sandra Farrell – The Chairman of Ashburn United, who spends large amounts of her and her husband Vincent's money on the club, she works as co-head of Farrell Funeral Directors. Sandra tends to use foul language and aggressive tendencies against her opponents, which her daughter Ali picks up. Sandra often compares herself to Roman Abramovich.
- Vincent Farrell – Co-Head of Farrell Funeral Directors and Ashburn's underwriter, he struggles to pay the bills and keep up with the financial demands of his wife for Ashburn United. He is often kept under Sandra's thumb and is more focused on the Funeral directors, which tends to get less funerals due to a decrease in dying.
- Dr Kaskar – Kaskar is a gynaecologist and Terry's main rival at Ashburn United, he is also the Fitness Coach for the team. He wants his son Ranjit to secure a football career and is often at odds with Terry over team management and formations.
- Raymond Mercier – The new dishy French coach of Ashburn United after Tom Blackley's stroke, who was recommended by Bolton scout Jeff Inchcliffe he uses a 4-5-1 formation and makes sure that things like nutrition and fitness are used in his training sessions to secure ultimate prowess for the team. He is often called things like Clouseau and Jacques Twatty by Terry.
- Debbie Rossi – The mother of Jack and friend of Janice, she went through a messy divorce prior to the series start and as a result spends most of her time in the gym.
- Steve Robson – Owner of Steve Robson motors and former Bolton Wanderers player, who accidentally ended Terry's career in training. Terry now works under him in Mechanics, Robson also still carries a flame for Janice. Terry is always in his office pestering Steve to call Jeff Inchcliffe about Malky. His father had a heart attack in the second episode.
- Fourbellies – The overweight father of Gordy, who has a stomach the size of fourbellies, going for five in his own words. He is the best friend of Terry.
- Tom Blackley – Former Ashburn coach who suffered a stroke in the first episode after Terry badger's him to play Malky in the qualifying match for the Cup. He is then seen in a hospital bed when Sandra and others visit him.
- Malky McConnell – Joint leading scorer for Ashburn with Ranjit, Malky loves to play football but his dream is to become a chef, like his hero Gordon Ramsay. Terry wants Malky to play for Bolton one day.
- Ranjit Kaskar – Joint leading scorer for Ashburn with Malky, Ranjit is best friends with Malky and the two often celebrate goals together. His father Dr Kaskar wants Ranjit to be the star striker for Ashburn which Terry resents. Terry even laced Ranjit's food with laxatives in Episode 3 so Ranjit would be ill and Malky would play upfront in the upcoming game.
- Ali Farrell – The daughter of Sandra and Vincent, the foul mouthed and football-obsessed Ali, a defender is known to get sent off regularly and play dirty tactics, encouraged by her mother.
- Jack Rossi – The son of Debbie, he has seen his mum go through a divorce and dislikes the fact that she is always going to the gym, as of Episode 1, of 16 appearances this seasons he has been subbed 16 times.
- Gordy – Son of Fourbellies, and a defender he uses his tall size as an advantage to stop the opposition from getting through the lines.
- Hannah McConnell – Daughter of Terry and Janice, she is pretty much ignored by her father most of the time and is more into acting.

== Cast ==
- Steve Edge ... Terry McConnell
- Jennifer Hennessy ... Janice McConnell
- Tanya Franks ... Sandra Farrell
- Dominic Coleman ... Vincent Farrell
- Pal Aron ... Dr Kaskar
- Emmanuel Leconte ... Raymond Mercier
- Samantha Power ... Debbie Rossi
- Billy Geraghty ... Steve Robson
- Craig Cunningham ... Fourbellies
- Gordon Kane ... Tom Blackley
- Ceallach Spellman ... Malky McConnell
- Nazim Khan ... Ranjit Kaskar
- Haylie Jones ... Ali Farrell
- George Weaver ... Jack Rossi
- Henry Smith ... Gordy
- Amber Munsie ... Hannah McConnell
