= In One Ear =

Late-night comedy show on BBC Radio 4 from 1984 to 1986

In One Ear is a late-night alternative comedy sketch show, broadcast between 1984 and 1986, on BBC Radio 4 in the United Kingdom, broadcast live from the BBC Paris Studio in London, with a (sometimes edited) repeat later in the week.

The programme starred Nick Wilton, Helen Lederer, Clive Mantle, and Steve Brown. Writers included the cast and Jon Canter, Geoffrey Perkins, Jack (then John) Docherty, Terence Dackombe, and Moray Hunter.

In One Ear won a Sony Award in 1985. The programme was subsequently transferred to television as the short-lived Hello Mum. BBC Radio 7 has repeated episodes and compilations of the series.
