= Steve Edge =

English actor and writer

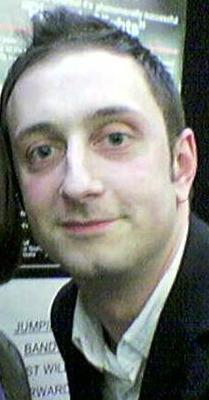
- Edge in 2004
- Born: 2 November 1972 (age 54); Cannock, Staffordshire, England

Comedy career
- Years active: 1997–present
- Medium: Stand-up; television
- Genres: Situation comedy, sketch comedy
- Subjects: Celebrities, Football, Prison

Steve Edge (born 2 November 1972) is an English actor, writer and former stand-up comedian. He is most famous for his work on Starlings, Phoenix Nights, The Cup, The Visit, Peep Show, The Madame Blanc Mysteries, and the satirical magazine show Star Stories.

== Early life and stand-up ==
Edge was born in Cannock, Staffordshire, England. He attended Stafford College and the University of Salford. He began his career in 1997 and from then until 2004 worked as a stand-up comedian. From March–November 2004 Steve, Paddy McGuinness, Archie Kelly and Janice Connolly toured a live stand-up show "Jumping on the Bandwagon" in reference to the success of Phoenix Nights. The final show of the tour and the last time he did stand-up was at the Winter Gardens, Blackpool. Edge is most famous for playing Alan, one half of double-act Les Alanos with Les played by Toby Foster in That Peter Kay Thing, Peter Kay's Phoenix Nights and Max and Paddy's Road to Nowhere. He reprised the role in 2015 for Phoenix Nights LIVE where the cast performed 16 shows at Manchester Arena and raised £5 million for Comic Relief.

== Writing and other work ==
Edge was a programme associate/writer on 8 Out of 10 Cats from 2007 to 2011.

He was script editor for the BBC2 comedy The Cup in which he also starred as the lead, Terry McConnell.

In 2009 he wrote the BBC1 show Walk on the Wild Side along with Jason Manford as well as adding the voices to the show, most notably the Marmot repeatedly shouting "Alan".

In 2009 he wrote and narrated BBC3's Almost Famous III its 2010 sequel Almost Famous IV.

In 2002 he starred in a series of improvised adverts directed by Graham Linehan, for the now defunct ITV Sport Channel.

He starred as a hapless undertaker in the Elbow promo for the song "Not a Job".

Edge is the creator and co-writer of the series Starlings on Sky1 along with Matt King.

He used to join Jason Manford on Manford's Sunday morning radio show on Absolute Radio until the show ended

== Personal life ==
Edge is a season ticket holder at Wolverhampton Wanderers F.C. He was married in August 2014, with his friend and colleague Jason Manford as best man. He is godfather to Manford's twin daughters.

== Filmography ==
=== Film ===
Year	Title	Role	Notes
2007	Magicians	Tony White	
2014	Paddington	Natural History Museum Security Guard	
2021	Cruella	Steven the Jewellery Shop Assistant	
2022	Floodlights	Terry Woodward	
2023	Bank of Dave	Compere	

=== Television ===
Year	Title	Role	Notes
2000	Live at the Top of the Tower	Brian	
2000	That Peter Kay Thing	Alan	4 Episodes
2001–2002	Phoenix Nights	Alan	12 Episodes
2003	Cold Feet	Sean	Episode: #5.2
2004	Family Business	Trevor	1 Episode
2004	No Angels	Ray	3 Episodes
2004	Peep Show	Daryl	1 Episode
2004	Max and Paddy's Road to Nowhere	Alan	2 Episodes
2004	Christmas Lights	Gibbo	
2005	Mike Basset: Manager	Doddy	6 Episodes
2005	Twisted Tales	Trax	1 Episode
2006	The Street	Malcolm McKenzie	1 episode
2006	I'm with Stupid	Sgt. Swithenback	6 episodes
2006–2008	Star Stories	Various	5 episodes
2007	The Visit	Clint	7 episodes
2007	Dogface	Various	4 episodes
2008	The Cup	Terry McConnell	All 6 episodes
2009	Comedy Showcase	Phil	Episode: "Guantanamo Phil"
2010	Secret Diary of a Call Girl	Hamish	Episode: #3.2
2010	Scallywagga	Mr. Styles	All 6 episodes
2010	The Great Outdoors	Tom	All 3 episodes
2011	Lunch Monkeys	Pat	Episode: "Who's the Daddy?"
2012	The Increasingly Poor Decisions of Todd Margaret	Lionel T'Lion	Episode: "Todd and his Valet Arrive in Leeds and What They Saw There"
2012	The Royal Bodyguard	Constable Truncheon	Episode: "A Watery Grave"
2012–2013	Starlings	Fergie	All 16 episodes
2013	Love Matters	Warren	Episode: "Officially Special"
2013–2015	All at Sea	Kevin Enright	All 26 episodes
2015	Drunk History: UK	Various	3 episodes
2016	Do Not Disturb	Neil	TV film
2016	Happy Valley	Graham Tattersall	2 episodes
2016	Plebs	Justin	Episode: "Justin Junior"
2016–2018	Benidorm	Billy Dawson	25 episodes
2018	The Split	Matthew Royston	Episode: #1.4
2018	Urban Myths	Barry	Episode: "Public Enemy (feat. Kev Wells)"
2018	The Reluctant Landlord	David Foster	12 episodes
2019	Scarborough	Bigsy	All 6 episodes
2021	Death in Paradise	Freddie Archer	Episode: #10.4
2021	Murder, They Hope	Simon	Episode: "Evil Under the Bun"
2021–present	The Madame Blanc Mysteries	Dom Hayes	Main character
2022	Shakespeare & Hathaway: Private Investigators	Rob Davenport	Episode: "I No More Desire a Rose"
2022	Maxine	Brian Farmer	All 3 episodes
2023	Ted Lasso	Simon	Episode: Mom City

== Awards and nominations ==
- Finalist in the 1998 BBC New Comedy Awards competition at the Edinburgh Festival
- Nominated in 2004 for the Manchester Evening News Theatre Awards – Best Comedy for the "Jumping on the Bandwagon" Tour
- Nominated in 2005 North West Comedy Awards – Best Comedic Performance on Film & TV for I'm with Stupid
- Nominated in 2007 RTS Awards Best Performance in a Comedy for The Visit
- Nominated in 2008 British Comedy Awards Best Male Comedy Newcomer for The Cup
- Won in 2010 RTS Awards Best Performance in a Comedy for Scallywagga
