= Absolutely (TV series) =

- Also known as: The Absolutely Radio Show
- Directed by: Phil Chilvers; Alan Nixon; Alistair Clark; Graham C Williams
- Starring: Peter Baikie; Morwenna Banks; Jack Docherty; Moray Hunter; Gordon Kennedy; John Sparkes
- Theme music composer: Pete Baikie
- Country of origin: United Kingdom
- No. of episodes: 28 (television series); 12 + 1 special (radio series); (list of episodes)

Production
- Producers: Alan Nixon; David Tyler; (television); Gordon Kennedy; Gus Beattie; (radio)
- Production locations: The London Studios (television); Òran Mór, Glasgow (radio)
- Camera setup: Multi-camera
- Running time: 45 minutes (TV series 1 & 2); 35 minutes (TV series 3 & 4); 30 minutes (radio)
- Production company: Absolutely Productions / The Comedy Unit / Gusman Productions

Original release
- Network: Channel 4
- Release: 23 May 1989 – 26 February 1993
- Network: BBC Radio 4
- Release: 20 May 2013 – July 2019

Related
- Mr Don & Mr George; Barry Welsh Is Coming

Absolutely is a British comedy sketch show. The cast and crew are mainly Scottish; the principal writers and performers are Moray Hunter, Jack Docherty, Peter Baikie, Gordon Kennedy (all of whom had performed together as The Bodgers for many years), Morwenna Banks (Cornish) and John Sparkes (Welsh). The original television series, produced by Absolutely Productions, aired on Channel 4 for four series between May 1989 and February 1993. Following an award-winning one-off radio reunion special for BBC Radio 4 in 2013, the show returned for a new four-part radio series with most of the original cast in September 2015. A second Radio 4 series of four programmes was broadcast from 25 June 2017, and a third in July 2019.

== Recurring characters ==
- Stoneybridge Town Council (played by the entire cast) were the council of the fictional small Scottish town of Stoneybridge. Originally meant to be a one-off mocking the plague of promotional videos and adverts done by many British towns during the 1980s and 1990s, the characters proved so popular that they snowballed into a regular parody of small town and village councils run by the parochial minded with jarring grandiose aspirations for themselves and the people they are trying to serve (for example, bidding to host the Olympic Games).
- Frank Hovis (played by Sparkes) was a character described as a club host, who first appeared in series three in a series of monologues, which he self-titled as "On the Lavatory (once replaced by 'The Lavatory Express') with Frank Hovis". These were set in an unpleasant public toilet cubicle with no toilet paper, where Frank would draw upon his own personal experiences in a slurred northern English accent, usually involving toilet humour. Outside of Absolutely, Hovis featured in his own panel game show for BBC Wales entitled Pub Quiz.
- McGlashan (played by Docherty) was an extreme Scottish nationalist and playwright, who frequently espoused anglophobia.
- Calum Gilhooley (played by Hunter) was introduced as the most boring man in the world. Well-meaning but extremely dull, he talked endlessly about his anorak ("it has pockets, which is good, 'cos you can keep things in them, and they open and close") and Suzuki motorbikes.
- Denzil and Gwynedd (played by Sparkes and Banks) were a dysfunctional Welsh married couple. Denzil, a DIY enthusiast without the skill to match, was supercilious and dismissive of his wife, whilst Gwynedd was ambitious but simple - later reappeared post-Absolutely in Barry Welsh Is Coming. Some of their TV sketches had Welsh subtitles, and the two characters spoke cod-Welsh or in English with exaggerated Welsh accents (and what in Swansea are going on here?).
- The Little Girl (played by Banks) would enthusiastically describe her understanding of a topic such as death, dentists, going on an aeroplane, or the government in an overexcited bluster. The sketches often ended with her exclaiming, "It is, it's true!" Morwenna would later perform this character after she was hired on Saturday Night Live and again in several episodes of her own comedy sketch show THE MORWENNA BANKS SHOW...
- The Nice Family (played by the entire cast) was a parody of a straight-laced middle-class family, none of whom have names, but were referred to by their titles of "Father" (Docherty), "Mother" (Kennedy, always with his back to the audience, cleaning), "Eldest son" (Sparkes), "Daughter" (Banks), "First twin" (Baikie) and "Second twin" (Hunter). The Father was the dominant figure of the family, with everyone else looking exactly like him, wearing beige jumpers, white collar shirts, brown ties, brown slacks (except the women who wear brown skirts) and black shoes. A framed photograph of John Major was sometimes seen on their wall.
- George and Donald McDiarmid (played by Docherty and Hunter) were a surreal duo who would appear in almost every episode. George McDiarmid was dressed in a black pinstripe suit and tie, while Don McDiarmid (no relation) was dressed in tweed, a bow tie, and an unusual pair of glasses with one lens at a right angle. The two characters would go on to get their own sit-com Mr Don & Mr George.
- Peter and Jennifer Wells (played by Docherty and Banks) were a well-off couple introduced in series two, who were keen to support charities but often let their own prejudices get in the way.
- Bert Bastard (played by Sparkes) was a very rude and profane old man who was very feeble and not able to perform many day-to-day tasks such as cooking and eating.
- The Musical Sections featured in every episode, but by series two Baikie developed a character of a smug piano man - Mr Muzak. The piano player would often be used to link sketches together by playing his piano across the set. Another regular musical character was created in series four - The Laughing Man who had the habit of laughing at not very amusing bumper stickers and signs.
- Gwyn (played by Sparkes) is a Welshman who would often give monologues to camera. Gwyn suffered from a constant nervous twitch which resulted in his body shaking all over the place and whistling while he talked. The character was first performed by Sparkes when he performed stand-up comedy before Absolutely. Gwyn reappeared in Sparkes' post-Absolutely series, Barry Welsh Is Coming.

== History ==
=== Television ===
The original television run of Absolutely ran for four series, with a total of 28 episodes:

- Series 1: Six episodes transmitted between 23 May 1989 and 27 June 1989
- Series 2: Eight episodes transmitted between 22 August 1990 and 10 October 1990
- Series 3: Eight episodes transmitted between 17 May 1991 and 5 July 1991
- Series 4: Six episodes transmitted between 22 January 1993 and 26 February 1993

The characters of Don and George subsequently featured in their own spin-off series Mr. Don and Mr. George, which ran for six episodes.

In 1995, a pilot was shown on BBC2 for a series called Mac, a sitcom based around MacGlashan and his long-suffering brother Finley (played by Gordon Kennedy). Finley ran a small shop selling the sort of stereotypical Scottish kitsch for tourists that inflamed Mac's senses, his assistant Aileen (played by Elaine Collins of City Lights) acted as Mac's love interest, while Nick Hancock played his Londoner love rival Van Webster.

All four series of Absolutely were released as a DVD boxset entitled Absolutely Everything on 5 May 2008. Upon authoring the DVD, it was discovered that the master tape for Series 1, Episode 2 no longer exists in Channel 4's archives and thus an off-air copy is used on the boxset instead. Whether the episode was deliberately wiped or just improperly archived is unknown.

=== Radio ===
A reunion show was aired as part of BBC Radio 4's Sketchorama series, first broadcast on 20 May 2013. An extended version of the show was broadcast on BBC Radio 4 in August 2013. A year later, the special won a BBC Audio Drama award for best live scripted comedy.

Absolutely returned as a four-part radio series for BBC Radio 4 in September 2015, again featuring the original cast without Jack Docherty. The new series, a co-production between Absolutely Productions Ltd and The Comedy Unit, was recorded on two evenings in August and September 2015 at Òran Mór in Glasgow. The first episode was broadcast on Sunday 6 September 2015.

A second four-part series aired on BBC Radio 4 during the summer of 2017, with a third following in July 2019.

=== Live ===
In the early 1990s, Pete Baikie and Gordon Kennedy briefly toured as comedy band, The Hairstyles.

In the mid-90s, following the success of TV spin-off Mr. Don & Mr. George, Moray Hunter and Jack Docherty toured together as Hunter and Docherty.

== Transmissions ==
Series	Episodes	Originally released	
Series	Episodes	First released	Last released
1	6	23 May 1989	27 June 1989
2	8	22 August 1990	12 October 1990
3	8	17 May 1991	5 July 1991
4	6	22 January 1993	26 February 1993
