= Ricky Callan =

Ricky Callan was one of Scotland's best known character actors, born 28 December 1961. A familiar face on television, he had a long list of credits to his name, including The Young Person's Guide to Becoming a Rock Star, Taggart, Monarch of the Glen, Rebus and Velvet Soup. He was also a stand-up comedian and familiar voice on radio.

In 2001 he wrote the screenplay for the short film Pork Chop. He starred in the film Joe Smeal's Wheels directed by Leon the Pig Farmer screenwriter Michael Normand.

After a long illness, Callan died on 11 October 2016.
