= Robert Kime =

British interior decorator (1946–2022)

Robert Kime (7 February 1946 – 17 August 2022) was a British interior decorator. He worked on the homes of Prince Charles, Daphne Guinness, and the Duke of Beaufort, among others.
