= The Tournament (TV series) =

Canadian television series

- Starring: Alain Goulem; Paula Boudreau; Christian Potenza; Emily Tilson; Ari Cohen; Cas Anvar
- Country of origin: Canada
- No. of seasons: 2
- No. of episodes: 17

Original release
- Network: CBC Television
- Release: 2005 – 2006

Related
- The Cup

The Tournament is a Canadian television series, which aired on CBC Television in 2005 and 2006. The series, a mockumentary show about a community minor hockey team, depicted the behind-the-scenes interactions between the players, their parents and coaches as the team competed for a spot in the annual youth hockey championship tournament.

The cast included Alain Goulem, Paula Boudreau, Christian Potenza, Emily Tilson, Ari Cohen and Cas Anvar.

Seven episodes were produced in the 2004–05 television season, airing in the winter of 2005, and ten episodes were produced in the 2005–06 season. The CBC announced on February 13, 2006, that the show would not be brought back for the 2006–07 television season. The series was briefly televised in the United States on OLN, which had the rights to the National Hockey League at the time.

== Reception ==
The Serious Comedy Site said "The Tournament: The Complete Series is an absolute must for anyone who has ever been involved in amateur hockey. For those who like comparisons it is the Bad News Bears meets Slap Shot."

The TV show was remade in the UK as The Cup, and adapted to be about a junior soccer team instead of a minor hockey team.
