= Peter Baikie =

Scottish comedian and composer

- Born: 1957 (age 68–69); Edinburgh, Scotland
- Other names: Pete Baikie
- Known for: Comedian, composer
- Parent(s): Rae Baikie; Jim Baikie

Peter Baikie (born 1957) is a Scottish comedian and composer.

Baikie appeared in the British comedy sketch-show Absolutely, composed music for TV and radio and helped set up 'The Smiling Sessions', a charity that brings live music into care homes. As a TV producer, he won 4 Welsh BAFTA Awards for his work with John Sparkes.

== Comedy career ==
Baikie first performed at the 1980 Edinburgh Festival Fringe with the comedy sketch group 'The Bodgers' which he formed with George Watson's College schoolfriends Moray Hunter, Gordon Kennedy and Jack Docherty. Their 1984 show 'Arfington, Arfington' and '85 show 'Mr Hargreaves Did It' were both shortlisted for the Perrier Comedy Award.

The four Bodgers moved to London in 1986 and began performing on the alternative comedy circuit. They were teamed up with Morwenna Banks and John Sparkes by producer Alan Nixon, first for the radio show 'Bodgers, Banks and Sparks' and then the television sketch show Absolutely which ran for four seasons on Channel 4 from 1989 to 1993. He also acted in the Disney film Swing Kids.

In 1995, Baikie teamed up with fellow Absolutely comedian John Sparkes to write and co-present the world's first comedy nature TV series 'Squawkie Talkie'. Thereafter, he continued working with Sparkes and won 4 Welsh BAFTA Awards for Best Light Entertainment for producing 'Barry Welsh is Coming' and three 'Hugh Pugh' specials between 1996 and 2002. He also produced 'The Morwenna Banks Show' and numerous editions of 'The Jack Docherty Show' which launched with Channel Five in 1997.

Twenty years after Absolutely had first appeared on television, the team performed a one-off reunion for Radio 4's 'Sketchorama' in The Òran Mór, Glasgow produced by The Comedy Unit. The group enjoyed their comeback and the programme won 'Best Scripted Comedy with Audience' in the 2014 Audio Drama Awards. Three radio series of 'The Absolutely Radio Show' followed on Radio 4 between 2015 and 2019.

== Music career ==
As a TV composer, Baikie's credits include the theme music and songs for Shooting Stars, It's Only TV...But I Like It and The Big Fat Quiz of the Year, Two Fat Ladies, 2DTV, 'The Preventers', Meg and Mog, Stressed Eric, Barbara, and Bang Bang, It's Reeves and Mortimer. He has also contributed songs and themes to many BBC Radio 4 shows including 'Reluctant Persuaders', 'The Quanderhorn Experimentations' and 'The Nether Regions'.

He was also the bandleader on The Jack Docherty Show leading Pete Baikie and The Peetles in a reference to his obsession with The Beatles. During this time, he got the chance to play 'Name that tune' with David Bowie and perform 'Wichita Lineman' with Glen Campbell.

Since 2012, he has been working regularly with 'The Smiling Sessions', a charity set up by violinist Alison Jones to bring live music into residential sheltered housing schemes, dementia centres and care homes.

He has also performed in various bands including 'The Hairstyles' with fellow Absolutely cast member Gordon Kennedy, 'The Glenbuck Cherrypickers', 'There's an Awful Lot of Coffee in Brazil', and 'The Irregulars'.
