= John Sparkes =

Welsh comedian (born 1954)

- Born: 6 January 1954 (age 72); Swansea, Wales
- Occupations: Comedian; actor
- Notable work: Barry Welsh Is Coming; Fireman Sam; Naked Video; Peppa Pig; Shaun the Sheep
- Spouse: Beverley Sparkes
- Children: 2

Comedy career
- Years active: 1986–present
- Medium: Film; stand-up; television
- Genres: Character comedy; improvisational comedy; sketch comedy

John Sparkes (born 6 January 1954) is a Welsh comedian and actor. He portrayed Barry Welsh, presenter of the HTV Wales series Barry Welsh Is Coming. He has also had major roles in Naked Video, Absolutely, Fireman Sam, Shaun the Sheep, and Jeff Global's Global Probe, and is the narrator of the children's television show Peppa Pig. In Shaun the Sheep, he voices Bitzer the Dog and the Farmer.

== Early life ==
Sparkes was born on 6 January 1954 in Swansea, Wales. After working, firstly at Lloyds Bank in Mumbles and then as a teacher, in the 1980s he turned to comedy and moved to London, performing on the alternative cabaret circuit with comedians such as Alexei Sayle, Jo Brand, Paul Merton, and Rik Mayall.

== Career ==
=== Naked Video and Absolutely ===
Sparkes starred in the sketch show Naked Video, where he played Siadwel, the geeky South Wales poet who wore an anorak and glasses. The character also appeared when Sparkes was part of the BBC Radio 4 comedy programme Bodgers, Banks & Sparkes.

He was one of the team behind the Channel 4 sketch show Absolutely, which ran for four years between 1989 and 1993. Following an award-winning radio special, a new series for BBC Radio 4 was commissioned for broadcast in September 2015.

=== Barry Welsh ===
Barry Welsh Is Coming was a long-running comedy series for HTV Wales. As well as playing Barry Welsh, the hapless host of a chat show, Sparkes also plays other characters within the programme, such as pub singer Gwyn, old Mr Ffff and Fishguard news reporter Hugh Pugh. Although the series ended in 2004, it returned in 2007 for a series of one-off specials.

Throughout its original run, the series also won four BAFTA Cymru awards for Best Light Entertainment.

=== Children's television ===
Sparkes provides the voice of the narrator and some other characters in the children's animated series Peppa Pig, in which the voice of fellow Absolutely star Morwenna Banks is also featured. In Shaun the Sheep he voices Bitzer the Dog and the Farmer. He also voices Mr Elf and King Marigold in Ben & Holly's Little Kingdom, Professor von Proton in The Big Knights, Steven in A Town Called Panic, and the majority of male characters (besides James), including it’s lead character Fireman Sam in the 2005 series.

=== Radio ===
After killing off Siadwel in Naked Video, Sparkes revived the character in 2014 for a new series of radio shows for BBC Radio Wales, which was recommissioned a year later.

=== Writing ===
Sparkes has written and presented three ongoing television series of Great Pubs of Wales for ITV Wales. He has voiced the unseen character of archivist Goronwy, in a section of Wallace and Gromit's World of Invention for BBC One and has written and presented Ghost Story, in which he spent the night alone with a camcorder in haunted houses around Wales. He has also co-written and presented Doug Strong's Special Places, a factual comedy series for ITV Wales and ITV Central.

=== Other work ===
In 2005, Sparkes performed at the Edinburgh Festival Fringe in Absolutely Presents John Sparkes and Pete Baikie with his Absolutely colleague Peter Baikie.

For Welsh television, he starred in Jeff Global's Global Probe (ITV Wales), and he resurrected the character Frank Hovis, originally devised for the Absolutely series, in Pub Quiz (BBC Wales).

== Personal life ==
Sparkes is married to Beverly and they have two daughters.

== Filmography ==
=== Film ===
Year	Title	Role	Notes
1989	Melancholia	Roger Dere	British-German film by Andi Engel, starring Jeroen Krabbé
2003	Calendar Girls	Welsh Photographer	
2015	Shaun the Sheep Movie	The Farmer, Bitzer	Voice role
2015	Peppa Pig: The Golden Boots	Narrator, Mr Potato	Voice role
2015	Shaun the Sheep: The Farmer's Llamas	The Farmer, Bitzer, Hector	Voice role
2017	Peppa Pig: My First Cinema Experience	Narrator	Voice role
2019	A Shaun the Sheep Movie: Farmageddon	The Farmer, Bitzer	Voice role
2024	Wallace & Gromit: Vengeance Most Fowl	The Farmer	Voice role, cameo
2026	Shaun the Sheep: The Beast of Mossy Bottom	The Farmer, Bitzer	Voice role

=== Television ===
Year	Title	Role	Notes
1986	Naked Video	Siadwel	6 episodes
1988	Cabaret at Jongleurs	Unknown role	1 episode
1989–1993	Absolutely	Various characters	28 episodes
1992	Angry George Irons	Unknown role (voice)	1 episode
1992	Saturday Zoo	Glaswegian Matron	1 episode
1994–1995	The All New Alexei Sayle Show	Various characters	8 episodes
1996–2004	Barry Welsh Is Coming	Barry Welsh, Hugh Pugh, various characters	
1998	Comedy Nation	Various roles	
1999–2000	The Big Knights	Various roles	
2000	The Strangerers	Bilbo	2 episodes
2001–2005	Pub Quiz	Frank Hovis	
2002	A Town Called Panic	Robin (voice)	1 episode
2004	Jeff Global's Global Probe	Various roles	
2004–present	Peppa Pig	Narrator, Mr Rabbit, Mr Potato, Uncle Pig, Mr Pony (voices)	
2005	Fireman Sam	Fireman Samuel "Sam" Jones, Fireman Elvis Cridlington, Station Officer Basil Steele, Norman Price, Dilys Price, Trevor Evans, Tom Thomas, Mike Flood, Dusty (voices)	26 episodes
2005	Not Tonight with John Sergeant	Barry Welsh	TV movie
2007–present	Shaun the Sheep	The Farmer, Bitzer (voices)	
2009–2012	Ben & Holly's Little Kingdom	Mr Elf, King Marigold, Zoe Baker (voices)	44 episodes

=== Theatre ===
Year	Title	Role	Notes
2006–2007	Fireman Sam on Stage	Fireman Sam, Elvis Cridlington, Dilys Price, Norman Price, Tom Thomas	Voices
2025-2026	Peppa Pig's Big Family Show	Narrator	Voice
