= Meg and Mog =

Children's book series

Meg and Mog

Meg and Mog is a series of children's books written by Helen Nicoll and illustrated by Jan Pieńkowski. First published in the 1970s, the books are about Meg, a witch whose spells always seem to go wrong, her striped cat Mog, and their friend Owl. The first book was published in January 1972. Following the death of Helen Nicholl in 2012, the series was continued by Pieńkowski and David Walser.

== TV series and adaptations ==
The first Meg and Mog animation appeared on the Halloween episode of the BBC children's educational series Words and Pictures in 1977.

In 2001, an animated TV series of 52 five-minute episodes was planned to be produced as a co-production between Telemagination, TV-Loonland AG and Absolutely Productions for a 2002–2003 delivery, with Loonland holding non-UK rights to the series.

For unknown reasons, this plan never came through, and Absolutely instead teamed with Happy Life and Varga Budapest to produce the series instead for a late-2003 delivery, with CITV purchasing UK broadcast rights and Target Entertainment securing worldwide distribution. The series was first broadcast in the UK within that time.

It was produced by Carl Gorham and directed by Roger Mainwood, featuring the voices of Alan Bennett as Owl, Fay Ripley as Meg and Phil Cornwell as Mog with additional voices by Morwenna Banks and Paul Shearer.

A successful stage play also ran in London in the 1980s, starring Maureen Lipman as Meg.

== Titles ==
=== Book series ===
- Meg & Mog
- Mog's Missing
- Meg's Mummy
- Meg Up the Creek
- Meg, Mog & Og
- Meg at Sea
- Meg on the Moon
- Meg's Car
- Meg's Castle
- Meg's Eggs
- Mog at the Zoo
- Mog in the Fog
- Meg's Veg
- Mog's Mumps
- Meg Comes to School (formally known as Owl at School)
- Meg Goes to Bed
- Meg And The Pirate
- Meg & Mog Board Book
- Meg's Cauldron
- Meg's Fancy Dress
- Meg's Treasure
- Mog in Charge
- Meg and the Dragon (first written by David Walser)
- Meg's Christmas

=== Episodes ===
1. Meg, Mog and Owl 2. Owl's Voice 3. Meg on the Moon 4. Meg's Tent 5. Meg's Cake 6. Meg At Sea 7. Meg At The Circus 8. Meg And The Baby 9. Meg's Veg 10. Mog's Hiccups 11. Mog in The Fog 12. Meg's Picnic 13. Meg's Eggs 14. Meg's Cauldron 15. Meg at the Funfair 16. Meg's Car 17. Meg's Treasure 18. Meg's Race 19. Meg's Music 20. Meg up the Creek 21. Meg and the Sheep 22. Mog's Mumps 23. Meg's Museum 24. Owl at School 25. Meg's Christmas 26. Meg and the Snow 27. Cress's Hat 28. Mog in Charge 29. Meg's Castle 30. Owl at the Vet 31. Meg's Legs 32. Mog's Mistake 33. Mog at the Zoo 34. Meg and the Pirates 35. Meg and the Viking 36. Mog Can't Sleep 37. Mog and the Kitten 38. Meg's Egg Hunt 39. Owl's Mousehunt 40. Meg and the Volcano 41. Meg in the Desert 42. Mog's Box 43. Meg's Game 44. Mog's Sneeze 45. Meg and the Football 46. Mog's Race 47. Meg's Fancy Dress 48. Meg and the Cowboy 49. Owl's Birthday 50. Meg's Kite 51. Meg and the Dance 52. Mog and the Milk

== Name ==
"Mog" is a short form of moggy, a word for cat that is not a specific breed.

== See also ==
- Gobbolino, the Witch's Cat
- Simon Hanselmann

== External sources ==
- ISBN 0140569766 (Meg and Mog, 1983)
