= Gordon Kennedy (actor) =

Scottish actor, presenter and narrator

- Born: Gordon Gilbert Kennedy; 22 February 1958 (age 68); Glasgow, Scotland
- Occupations: Actor, presenter and narrator
- Years active: 1986–present
- Known for: Robin Hood, Red Cap, Absolutely

Gordon Gilbert Kennedy (born 22 February 1958) is a Scottish actor, presenter and narrator. He starred in the Channel 4 sketch show Absolutely, and appeared in BBC drama series Robin Hood and Red Cap.

== Biography ==
Kennedy grew up in Tranent, East Lothian, and attended George Watson's College in Edinburgh. He then studied at the Scottish School of PE at Jordanhill College (now part of the University of Strathclyde). In 2015, he was announced as the first patron of The Fraser Centre Community Trust in Tranent. He also studied for one year at Scott Sutherland School of Architecture, Garthdee, Aberdeen, in 1976–1977.

== Career ==
He first rose to prominence in the sketch show Absolutely and "progressed downwards to co-host" the 'original' National Lottery show, alongside Anthea Turner, as well as appearing as himself in a Punt and Dennis spoof of Bugs entitled Plugs as the antagonist who rigs the lottery results to win £100 million on an eight-week rollover. He has appeared in several dramas, including the role of Sergeant Bruce Hornsby in the BBC drama Red Cap. He has also appeared in the BBC Scotland soap River City.

From 2006 to 2009, he starred as Little John in all three series of the BBC production of Robin Hood.

From 2010 to 2012, Kennedy narrated the British edition of Kitchen Nightmares encompassing 26 episodes, replacing the US narrators J.V. Martin and Arthur Smith for the UK.

== Sports ==
Alongside his acting career, Kennedy was a rugby coach with London Wasps. He has also appeared many times on Test Match Sofa. His brother, Euan, was capped four times for the Scotland national rugby union team.

== Filmography ==
=== Film ===
Film
Year	Title	Role	Notes
1992	Just Like a Woman	C.J.	
1999	With or Without You	Ormonde	
2000	The Announcement	Frank	
2009	Mad Sad & Bad	Harry	
2013	The Borderlands	Deacon	
2013	Tank 432	Smith	
2017	T2 Trainspotting	Tulloch	

=== Television ===
Television
Year	Title	Role	Notes
1986	The Kenny Everett Television Show		Episode 4.1
1986	The Russ Abbot Show	Various characters	8 episodes
1988	Inspector Morse	Dewar's Detective	"The Settling of the Sun"
1988	This is David Lander	Angler	
1989–1993	Absolutely	Various characters	Series regular 28 episodes
1989	Red Dwarf	Hudzen-10	"The Last Day"
1991	The Outsiders	Presenter	Broadcast in Scotland only.
1994	Tales of Para Handy	Constable MacLeod	"A Night Alarm"
1994	Jolly a Man for All Seasons	Charlie Chalmers	Television film
1995	Atletico Partick	Jack Roan	Main cast
1998	The Morwenna Banks Show	Various characters	
1998	Norman Ormal: A Very Political Turtle	Yob Chairman	Television film
1999	Bostock's Cup	Edgar Pendulo	Television film
1999	The Big Knights	Count Vampire/Ogre	Voice
2000	Glasgow Kiss	Ewan Sommerville	Main role
2000	Stressed Eric	Various	Voice 13 episodes
2001	Love or Money	Michael	Television film
2001	Baddiel's Syndrome	Mr Deronda	"Dream Home"
2003	The Deal	John Brown	Television film
2003–2004	Red Cap	Sgt. Bruce Hornsby	Main cast 13 episodes
2005	Where the Heart Is	Alistair Pope	"Brief Encounters"
2005	River City	Graeme Macdonald	Episode dated 6 December 2005
2005	The Man-Eating Wolves of Gysinge	Thore Petre	Television film
2006–2009	Robin Hood	Little John	Main cast 38 episodes
2007	You Can Choose Your Friends	Pete Arden	Television film
2008	The Bill	Jim Lawson	"City Slickers" & "R.I.P P.I."
2010–2012	Kitchen Nightmares	Narrator	26 episodes
2010	Doctors	Thomas Brucker	"Gentle Giant"
2011	Skins	Alan Precopp	"Franky"
2011	Red Faction: Origins	Corvallis	Television film
2011	Combat Hospital	Captain Fitz	"Triage"
2012	Sherlock	Gary	"The Hounds of Baskerville"
2012	Doctors	Russ Moss	"A River in Egypt"
2013	Casualty	Steven/Steve Green	"Rabbits in Headlights" & "Gone in Sixty Seconds"
2013	Common Ground	Gino	"Eleanor"
2013	Being Human	Brendan	"The Last Broadcast"
2014	Endeavour	Alderman Gerald Wintergreen	"Neverland"
2015	A Long Long Crime Ago	Judge Hatter	Main cast
2016	Casualty	Steve Bonhomme	"A Clear Conscience"
2016	Tales From The Serengeti	Various	Voice
2016	The Windsors	Alec	3 episodes
2017	The Halcyon	Robbie	Main cast
2019	Vera	Eddie	"Cold River"
2019	Harlots	Arthur Chadwick	4 episodes

== Theatre ==
- Rocky Horror Show (1990–1991) – Eddie / Dr Scott
- Full House (2002) – Tim
- The Hairless Diva (2002) – Mr Smith
- The Corstorphine Road Nativity (2009) – Narrator
- The James Plays (2014) – Murdac Stewart / Livingston / John
- The Audience (2015) – Gordon Brown

== Radio ==
- The Absolutely Radio Show
- Mordrin McDonald: 21st-Century Wizard
- Mrs Sidhu Investigates – Mrs Sidhu's Deadly Highland Game
- Jeremy Hardy Speaks to the Nation

== Awards and nominations ==
Year	Work	Award	Category	Result	Ref.
2017	The Gun Man	Birmingham Film Festival	Best Actor	Nominated	
