= List of Fireman Sam characters =

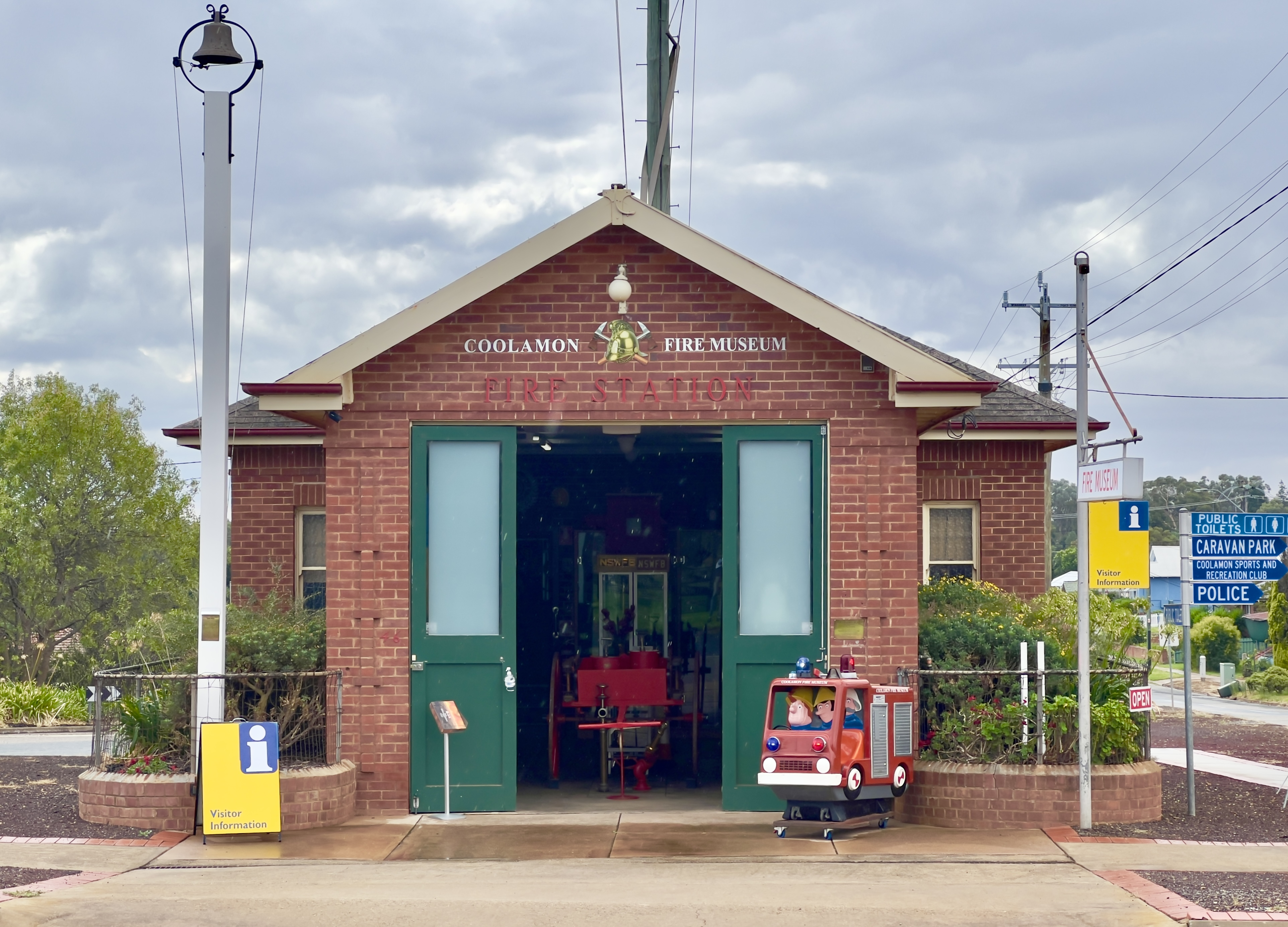
A Fireman Sam kiddie ride at Coolamon's fire house; featuring three characters, Sam, Elvis and Station Officer Steele.

Fireman Sam (Welsh: Sam Tân) first premiered in November 1987 on the Welsh TV channel S4C. The series is set in the fictional Welsh town of Pontypandy, which was retconned from being a rural village in the south Wales valleys to being a larger seaside fishing town in the 2008 remake series. Other locations mentioned include Cardiff and Newtown.

Originally featuring a small cast of characters, with the later series the cast was expanded to a large range of supporting characters of diverse backgrounds and occupations. The show focuses on the work of the Pontypandy fire service as well as the day-to-day lives of town residents. Every episode includes an emergency of some kind in which the characters say "call Fireman Sam", with a moral lesson being learned at its conclusion.

The series features an ensemble cast of regular and recurring characters, and began with nine human characters in its first series. All the characters in the original series were voiced by John Alderton, roughly divided between children and adults. The original four firefighters; Fireman Sam, Elvis, Station Officer Steele and Trevor were introduced alongside three child characters, Sam's niece and nephew Sarah and James and naughty Norman Price. They were joined by Norman's single-mother shopkeeper Dilys Price and Italian Pizzeria proprietor Bella Lasagne. The only other character introduced in the original run was the female firefighter Penny Morris who first appeared in Series 3.

In 2005, the revived series included all the old characters as well as new characters designed with the modern techniques of stop motion claymation. The Flood family was introduced consisting of Mike the Plumber, his wife Helen the Nurse, and their daughter Mandy. They were joined by Tom Thomas an Australian helicopter pilot. The main characters in this series were all voiced by John Sparkes, Joanna Ruiz and Sarah Hadland.

In 2008, the new CGI series saw the introduction of three new relatives of established characters; Sam's brother Charlie and his wife Bronwyn along with Norman's cousin Derek Price. The voice cast was also replaced, with the new voice actors for the series being Steven Kynman, Tegwen Tucker, David Carling and Su Douglas. With each new series since, more characters have been introduced including Bronwyn's train driver father Gareth Griffiths, Canadian adventurer Moose Roberts and the Chen and Sparkes families.

The animal characters have also played an important role in the series including dogs Dusty, Radar and Nipper, cats Rosa and Lion and sheep Woolly and Lambykins.

As well as the television series, the characters of Fireman Sam have appeared in a number of straight to video and DVD films, books, video games, musical theatre and in 2009 featured on Peter Kay's Children in Need single The Official BBC Children in Need Medley.

== Pontypandy Fire Service ==
=== Firefighters ===
==== Fireman Sam ====
Fireman Sam
- Fireman Sam character
- Fireman Sam as he appears in the CGI animated series.
- First appearance: The Kite (Series 1, Episode 1; 1987)
- Created by: Rob Lee
- Designed by: Rob Lee
- Portrayed by: Gary Lucas (Fireman Sam in Action); David Sullivan (Fireman Sam on Stage)
- Voiced by: John Alderton (1987–1994); John Sparkes (2005–2007); Steven Kynman (UK; 2008–present); Andrew Hodwitz (US; 2014–2020)

In-universe information
- Gender: Male
- Occupation: Firefighter
- Relatives: Charlie Jones (brother); Bronwyn Jones (sister-in-law); Sarah and James (niece and nephew)
- Nationality: British (Welsh)

Fireman Samuel "Sam" Jones is the title character of the series. He is a senior firefighter for the Pontypandy Fire Service. He is a competent and brave firefighter, who helps keep the people of Pontypandy safe. He considers his job to be 'the best job in the world' and often helps out in emergencies even on his days off. However, he does have an inventive streak which sometimes gets him in trouble when one of his inventions goes haywire: since the sixth series, he has stopped inventing, though he can be creative from time to time, such as fashioning a barbecue out of an oil drum in the episode "Sausages vs. Shrimps".

Sam has been a mascot for British fire services used to promote fire safety to children. In the original series, he lives alone in Pontypandy and has a niece and nephew Sarah and James. Sam drives a large fire engine called Jupiter, based on a Bedford TK, receiving elements of a Bedford 6x4 in Series 5 and elements from the Volvo FL6 in Series 6 and entirely a Rosenbauer Panther in Series 15. He also has an all-terrain vehicle called Mercury. Additionally, there is an Animal Rescue Crane called Phoenix, but it has been driven by multiple characters.

==== Elvis Cridlington ====
Elvis Cridlington
- Fireman Sam character
- First appearance: The Kite (Series 1, Episode 1; 1987)
- Created by: Rob Lee
- Designed by: Rob Lee
- Portrayed by: Mark Fredrick (Fireman Sam in Action); Andy Medhurst (Fireman Sam on Stage)
- Voiced by: John Alderton (1987–1994); John Sparkes (2005–2007); Steven Kynman (UK; 2008–present); Andrew Hodwitz (US; 2014–2020)

In-universe information
- Gender: Male
- Occupation: Firefighter, Chef, Guitarist
- Family: Jerry Lee Cridlington (cousin)
- Nationality: British (Welsh)

Firefighter Elvis Cridlington is a first class firefighter in Pontypandy and the station mess manager. He is Sam's sidekick and learns skills from Sam, often used for comic relief. As the fire station's cook, he enjoys cooking and playing guitar. His name and character design particularly his pompadour hairstyle was based on Elvis Presley.

In the CGI series, the character was criticised for being more childish than the original Elvis had been.

==== Station Officer Steele ====
Station Officer Steele
- Fireman Sam character
- First appearance: The Kite (Series 1, Episode 1; 1987)
- Created by: Rob Lee
- Designed by: Rob Lee
- Portrayed by: Ian Sinclair (Fireman Sam in Action)
- Voiced by: John Alderton (1987–1994); John Sparkes (2005); David Carling (UK; 2008–2024); Dave Pender (US; 2014–2020)

In-universe information
- Gender: Male
- Occupation: Station Officer
- Family: Doris (wife)
- Nationality: British (England)

Station Officer Steele is the officer in charge of Pontypandy Fire Station. He has a rail fire engine called Bessie and a mobile command unit.

In the original series, his real name is Basil Steele, while in the CGI series, it is Norris Steele.

He is referred to as Fire Captain Steele in the US dub of the CGI series.

The character of Steele has been compared to Captain Mainwaring from Dad's Army.

==== Penny Morris ====
Penny Morris
- Fireman Sam character
- First appearance: Dilys' Forgetful Day (Series 3, Episode 1; 18 September 1990)
- Created by: Rob Lee
- Designed by: Rob Lee
- Portrayed by: Victoria Edwards (Fireman Sam in Action); Adele Scott (Fireman Sam on Stage)
- Voiced by: John Alderton (1990–1994); Sarah Hadland (2005–2007); Tegwen Tucker (UK; 2008–present); Ashley Magwood (US; 2014–2020)

In-universe information
- Gender: Female
- Occupation: Firefighter
- Family: Annie Morris (cousin)
- Nationality: British (Welsh)

Firefighter Penny Morris is a firefighter in Pontypandy who was the only female firefighter (firewoman) from 1990 to 2015. Originally from Newtown, Penny moved to Pontypandy in Season 3. She is a trained lifeguard and certified scuba diver. She drives a rescue tender called Venus, as currently based on a Range Rover Carmichael Commando, but received elements of the greatly modified Mini Cooper from the fifth series being a water carrier. She also has a rescue boat called Neptune beginning from the sixth season until Ben Hooper operates it in the ninth season.

Her cousin farmer Annie Morris was introduced to the series in 2023.

==== Arnold McKinley ====
Arnold McKinley
- Fireman Sam character
- First appearance: Heroes of the Storm (4 November 2014)
- Voiced by: John Hasler (UK); Adam Turgeon (US)

In-universe information
- Gender: Male
- Occupation: Firefighter
- Nationality: British (Welsh)

Firefighter Arnold McKinley is a firefighter in Pontypandy.

He is an expert in technology and is often found in the office working on the computer.

He was first introduced alongside Ellie Phillips in the feature-length special Heroes of the Storm.

==== Ellie Phillips ====
Ellie Phillips
- Fireman Sam character
- First appearance: Heroes of the Storm (4 November 2014)
- Voiced by: Harriet Kershaw (UK; 2015–2022); Alexandra Mardell (UK; 2022–present); Christa Clahane (US; 2014–2020)

In-universe information
- Full name: Ellie Phillips
- Gender: Female
- Occupation: Firefighter
- Family: Jodie Phillips (sister)
- Nationality: British (Welsh)

Firefighter Ellie Phillips is a firefighter in Pontypandy. She is the second female firefighter after Penny.

Ellie is the main leader of the Pontypandy Junior Fire Cadets and is a keen athlete and will stop at nothing to accomplish a task.

She was first introduced alongside Arnold McKinley in the feature-length special Heroes of the Storm.

==== Chief Fire Officer Boyce ====
Chief Fire Officer Boyce
- Fireman Sam character
- First appearance: Fireman Sam: The Great Fire of Pontypandy (9 November 2009)
- Voiced by: David Carling (UK; 2009–2024); Joe Marth (US; Series 8–9); Dave McRae (US; Season 10–11)

In-universe information
- Gender: Male
- Occupation: Chief Fire Officer
- Home: Newtown
- Nationality: British (Welsh)

Chief Fire Officer Horatio Boyce is the chief fire officer of the Pontypandy Fire Service from Newtown.

He first appears in the 2009 film Fireman Sam: The Great Fire of Pontypandy.

=== Other rescue staff ===
==== Tom Thomas ====
Tom Thomas
- Fireman Sam character
- First appearance: Danger Falling Sheep (Series 5, Episode 1; 4 April 2005)
- Portrayed by: Andy Medhurst (Fireman Sam On Stage)
- Voiced by: John Sparkes (2005–2007); David Carling (UK/US; 2008–2024)

In-universe information
- Gender: Male
- Occupation: Helicopter pilot and manager of the Mountain Rescue Centre
- Nationality: Australian

Tom Thomas is an Australian helicopter pilot introduced in Series 5.

He owns his Mountain Rescue Centre. Has two helicopters called Wallaby 1 and Wallaby 2 and drives a yellow Jeep.

==== Ben Hooper ====
Ben Hooper
- Fireman Sam character
- First appearance: All at Sea (Series 9, Episode 1; 5 April 2014)
- Voiced by: Alex Lowe (UK); Jacob James (US)

In-universe information
- Gender: Male
- Occupation: Lifeguard
- Nationality: British (Welsh)

Ben Hooper is the coastguard in Pontypandy. He has driven a fireboat called Titan and a jet ski called Juno.

== Pontypandy Police Force ==
=== Malcolm Williams ===
Malcolm Williams
- Fireman Sam character
- First appearance: Red Hot Chilli Nibbles (Series 12 Episode 4; 27 October 2020)
- Voiced by: Colin McFarlane

In-universe information
- Occupation: Police constable
- Relatives: Helen Flood (sister); Mandy Flood (niece)

Police Constable Malcolm Williams is a Police Officer in Pontypandy. He transferred from The Big City hoping for some peace and quiet, but all is not as it seems.

He is the younger brother of Helen Flood.

=== Rose Ravani ===
Rose Ravani
- Fireman Sam character
- First appearance: Norman Price and the Mystery in the Sky (5 December 2020)
- Voiced by: Sasha Behar

In-universe information
- Occupation: Police sergeant

Sergeant Rose Ravani is the Senior Officer at Pontypandy Police Station, and puts all of her confidence in PC Malcolm to keep Pontypandy the safe and happy place it always has been. She is introduced in the 2020 TV movie Fireman Sam: Norman Price and the Mystery in the Sky.

She is voiced by former Coronation Street actress Sasha Behar, known for her role as Maya Sharma.

== Adults ==
=== Trevor Evans ===
Trevor Evans
- Fireman Sam character
- First appearance: The Kite (Series 1, Episode 1; 1987)
- Created by: Rob Lee
- Designed by: Rob Lee
- Portrayed by: Joe Vera (Fireman Sam in Action)
- Voiced by: John Alderton (1987–1994); John Sparkes (2005); David Carling (UK; 2008–2021); Gary Wilmot (UK; 2021–present); Mike Pongracz (US; 2014–2020)

In-universe information
- Gender: Male
- Occupation: Bus driver; Firefighter (original series)
- Nationality: British (Welsh)

Trevor Evans is the bus driver of Pontypandy. He drives a 1985 Ford Transit Dormobile and is also an auxiliary firefighter in the original series.

He is a romantic interest for Dilys Price.

=== Dilys Price ===
Dilys Price
- Fireman Sam character
- First appearance: The Kite (Series 1, Episode 1; 1987)
- Created by: Rob Lee
- Designed by: Rob Lee
- Portrayed by: Sarah Carleton (Fireman Sam in Action); Adele Scott (Fireman Sam on Stage)
- Voiced by: John Alderton (1987–1994); John Sparkes (2005–2007); Su Douglas (UK; 2008–present); Sarah Lynn Strange (US; 2014–2020)

In-universe information
- Gender: Female
- Occupation: Greengrocer
- Family: Norman Price (son); Derek Price (nephew)
- Nationality: British (Welsh)

Dilys Price is an original character from the series. She is the shopkeeper of the Cut-Price store. She is the strict mother to a son, Norman, whom she regularly disciplines.

A single mother, Dilys is a romantic interest of Trevor Evans. She is described as a gossiping greengrocer. Dilys frequently misuses words.

Her original appearance was similar to that of Coronation Street character Hilda Ogden. She drives her own car introduced in Alien Alert.

=== Bella Lasagne ===
Bella Lasagne
- Fireman Sam character
- First appearance: The Kite (Series 1, Episode 1; 1987)
- Created by: Rob Lee
- Designed by: Rob Lee
- Portrayed by: Sarah Dyall (Fireman Sam in Action)
- Voiced by: John Alderton (1987–1994); Sarah Hadland (2005); Harriet Kershaw (2016–present)

In-universe information
- Gender: Female
- Occupation: Café owner
- Nationality: Italian

Bella Lasagne is an original character from the series. She is an Italian citizen living in Wales and runs Bella's Café, a pizzeria in Pontypandy. She lives opposite the Price Family and has a pet cat named Rosa. She also has a pet goldfish named Pavarotti. Bella's "gentle and loveable" character was contrasted with the matriarchal approach of Dilys.

Bella appeared from Series 1 to 5 but was absent from the sixth to ninth series but returned in Series 10. She speaks with a heavy Italian accent.

=== Mike Flood ===
Mike Flood
- Fireman Sam character
- First appearance: A Real Live Wire (Series 5, Episode 4; 7 April 2005)
- Created by: Robin Lyons
- Designed by: Robin Lyons
- Voiced by: John Sparkes (2005); David Carling (UK; 2008–2024); Scott Lancastle (US; 2014–2020)

In-universe information
- Gender: Male
- Occupation: Handyman
- Spouse: Helen Flood (wife)
- Children: Mandy Flood (daughter)
- Relatives: Malcolm Williams (brother-in-law)
- Nationality: British (England)

Mike Flood is the handyman of Pontypandy. He has a green van used for carrying tools for repair work. He was introduced in Series 5 alongside his wife Helen Flood and daughter Mandy Flood. Mike is unlucky and regularly causes accidents.

In Series 5, Mike spoke with a West Country English accent, but in the CGI reboot he speaks with a northern accent. In Series 9, he states that he hails from Huddersfield in West Yorkshire yet in the US dub he has a Brooklyn accent.

=== Helen Flood ===
Helen Flood
- Fireman Sam character
- First appearance: Twist of Fate (Series 5, Episode 3; 6 April 2005)
- Voiced by: Joanna Ruiz (Series 5); Su Douglas (UK; Series 6–12); Ayesha Antoine (UK; Series 13–present); Becky Shrimpton (US; 2014–2020)

In-universe information
- Gender: Female
- Occupation: Nurse
- Spouse: Mike Flood (husband)
- Children: Mandy Flood (daughter)
- Relatives: Malcolm Williams (brother)
- Nationality: British (Welsh)/Jamaican

Helen Flood née Williams is the nurse of Pontypandy. She was introduced in Series 5 alongside her husband Mike Flood and daughter Mandy Flood.

She has her own ambulance car and an ambulance van for the Mountain Rescue service. She is implied to be of Jamaican descent.

In Series 12, her brother PC. Malcolm Williams was introduced.

=== Charlie Jones ===
Charlie Jones
- Fireman Sam character
- First appearance: Perilous Path (Series 6, Episode 4; 24 November 2008)
- Voiced by: Steven Kynman (UK); Jacob James (US)

In-universe information
- Gender: Male
- Occupation: Fisherman
- Spouse: Bronwyn Jones (wife)
- Children: Sarah and James Jones
- Relatives: Sam Jones (brother); Gareth Griffiths (father-in-law)
- Nationality: British (Welsh)

Charlie Jones is a fisherman. He is the father of Sarah and James and younger brother of Fireman Sam. He and his wife Bronwyn had been previously unseen until the CGI Series 6.

He operates a green fishing boat.

=== Bronwyn Jones ===
Bronwyn Jones
- Fireman Sam character
- First appearance: Hot and Cold Running Sniffer Dog (Series 6, Episode 2; 24 November 2008)
- Voiced by: Tegwen Tucker (UK); Margaret Brock (US)

In-universe information
- Gender: Female
- Occupation: Café owner
- Spouse: Charlie Jones (husband)
- Children: Sarah and James Jones
- Relatives: Gareth Griffiths (father); Sam Jones (brother-in-law)
- Nationality: British (Welsh)

Bronwyn Jones née Griffiths is the new age mother of Sarah and James. She is married to Charlie Jones and is Fireman Sam's sister in-law.

With the departure of Bella Lasagne, Bronwyn runs the new Wholefish cafe. Although she was raised in the city, she feels much more at home in Pontypandy.

In Series 8, her father Gareth Griffiths is introduced.

=== Moose Roberts ===
Moose Roberts
- Fireman Sam character
- First appearance: Bronwyn's Millionth Customer (Series 8, Episode 1; 10 March 2012)
- Voiced by: Nigel Whitmey (2012–present)

In-universe information
- Gender: Male
- Occupation: Mountain climber
- Nationality: Canadian

Moose Roberts is a famous mountain climber from Canada. He owns and runs the Mountain Activity Centre. He is voiced by Nigel Whitmey.

=== Gareth Griffiths ===
Gareth Griffiths
- Fireman Sam character
- First appearance: Runaway Train (Series 8, Episode 2; 10 March 2012)
- Voiced by: Ifan Huw Dafydd (UK, 2012-2018); Gary Andrewws (UK; 2020–present); Joe Marth (US; 2014–2015); Dave McRae (US; 2017–2020)

In-universe information
- Gender: Male
- Occupation: Train driver
- Children: Bronwyn Jones (daughter)
- Relatives: Sarah and James (grandchildren); Charlie Jones
- Nationality: British (Welsh)

Gareth Griffiths is the father of Bronwyn, maternal grandfather of Sarah and James and father-in-law of Charlie. He runs the Pontypandy Flyer steam train, which runs on a short, steep heritage railway line up to the base of Pontypandy Mountain. He appears to have been an avid yachtsman in his youth having been Captain of the Pontypandy rowing team.

=== Mrs. Chen ===
Mrs. Chen
- Fireman Sam character
- First appearance: Runaway Train (Series 8, Episode 2; 10 March 2012)
- Voiced by: Tegwen Tucker (UK; Series 8–12); Siu-see Hung (UK; Series 13–present); Margaret Brock (US; 2014–2020)

In-universe information
- Gender: Female
- Occupation: Schoolteacher
- Children: Lily Chen
- Nationality: Chinese

Mrs. Chen is the town's bossy schoolteacher. She has a young daughter called Lily.

=== Joe Sparkes ===
Joe Sparkes
- Fireman Sam character
- First appearance: All at Sea (Series 9, Episode 1; 5 April 2014)
- Voiced by: Alex Lowe (UK); Mike Pongracz (US)

In-universe information
- Gender: Male
- Occupation: Mechanic
- Spouse: Lizzie Sparkes
- Children: Hannah Sparkes
- Nationality: British (Welsh)

Joe Sparkes is the town's mechanic. His daughter is named Hannah and his wife is named Lizzie.

=== Lizzie Sparkes ===
Lizzie Sparkes
- Fireman Sam character
- First appearance: All at Sea (Series 9, Episode 1; 5 April 2014)
- Voiced by: Jo Wyatt (UK); Margaret Brock (US)

In-universe information
- Gender: Female
- Occupation: Veterinarian
- Spouse: Joe Sparkes
- Children: Hannah Sparkes
- Nationality: British (Welsh)

Lizzie Sparkes is the town's veterinary surgeon. She is also a member of the town's Volunteer Rescue Squad. Her husband is Joe and her daughter is Hannah.

=== Krystyna Kaminski ===
Krystyna Kaminski
- Fireman Sam character
- First appearance: Series 14 (2022)
- Voiced by: Krystyna O'Brien

In-universe information
- Gender: Female
- Occupation: Rescue pilot
- Family: Peter Kaminski (half-brother)
- Nationality: Polish

Krystyna Kaminski is a rescue pilot introduced in Series 14. She has a half-brother named Peter.

She is the first Polish character in the series. Krystyna is voiced by Krystyna O'Brien.

=== Annie Morris ===
Annie Morris
- Fireman Sam character
- First appearance: Boar Breakout (Series 15, Episode 1; 21 October 2023)
- Voiced by: Helen Skelton (2023–present)

In-universe information
- Gender: Female
- Family: Penny Morris (cousin)
- Home: Pontypandy

Annie Morris is a farmer who is the cousin of Penny Morris. She was introduced in Series 15 and is voiced by Helen Skelton.

== Children ==
=== Norman Price ===
Norman Price
- Fireman Sam character
- First appearance: The Kite (Series 1, Episode 1; 1987)
- Created by: Rob Lee
- Designed by: Rob Lee
- Portrayed by: Karen Briffett (Fireman Sam in Action); Dinah Lees (Fireman Sam on Stage)
- Voiced by: John Alderton (1987–1994); John Sparkes (2005–2007); Steven Kynman (UK; 2008–present); Carter Treneer (US; 2014–2017); Mark Ricci (US; 2018–2020)

In-universe information
- Gender: Male
- Family: Dilys Price (mother); Derek Price (cousin)

Norman Stanley Price is the son of shopkeeper Dilys Price. He is a mischievous redhead turned scapegoat, who loves playing practical jokes and skateboarding. He frequently causes accidents.

From Series 6, Norman became more troublesome. He has shown interest in becoming a firefighter himself one day, but he also has said he was going to be a shepherd when he grows up as stated in the episode Sheepdog Trials. He has also shown to be interested in science, as seen in the episode Chemistry Set.

He is based on Dennis the Menace from The Beano.

=== Sarah and James ===
Sarah and James Jones
- Fireman Sam character
- First appearance: The Kite (Series 1, Episode 1; 1987)
- Created by: Rob Lee
- Designed by: Rob Lee
- Portrayed by: Emma Watt (Fireman Sam in Action: Sarah); Kelly East (Fireman Sam in Action: James)
- Voiced by: John Alderton (1987–1994); Joanna Ruiz (2005); Tegwen Tucker (UK; 2008–present: Sarah); Steven Kynman (UK; 2008–2009: James); John Hasler (UK; 2012–present: James); Lily Cassano (US; 2014–2020: Sarah); Jonah Ain (US; 2014–2016: James); Chris D'Silva (US; 2020: James)

In-universe information
- Gender: Male and female
- Family: Charlie Jones (father); Bronwyn Jones (mother); Gareth Griffiths (grandfather); Sam Jones (uncle)

Sarah and James Jones are two original characters from the original series. Sarah and James are twin siblings. Sarah is the older twin and James is the younger twin. In the first five series, the two of them respected each other very much and were very well-behaved, but as of the sixth series, they have a sibling rivalry with each other and are not as well-behaved as they used to be.

Originally, Sarah and James were very similar to each other, but later series developed them to have their own personalities. Sarah developed into being very outgoing, way tougher and braver than James and being a bit of a tomboy. While James developed into being sensitive and cautious, as he is often scared of many things and lacks confidence. Both Sarah and James changed appearance throughout the original series, the fifth series and the CGI series, mostly with the clothing. The two are always portrayed with short blonde hair.

Their parents Charlie and Bronwyn Jones are introduced in Series 6, and their maternal grandfather Gareth Griffiths was introduced in Series 8.

=== Mandy Flood ===
Mandy Flood
- Fireman Sam character
- First appearance: Danger Falling Sheep (Series 5, Episode 1; 4 April 2005)
- Created by: Robin Lyons
- Designed by: Robin Lyons
- Portrayed by: Clarie Finley (Fireman Sam on Stage)
- Voiced by: Sarah Hadland (2005–2007); Su Douglas (UK; 2008–2021); Ayesha Antoine (UK; 2021–present); Belle Lemieux-Chan (US; 2014–2020)

In-universe information
- Gender: Female
- Family: Mike Flood (father); Helen Flood (mother)
- Relatives: Malcolm Williams (maternal uncle)
- Home: Pontypandy

Mandy Flood is a young girl who is friends with Norman Price. She lives with her parents Helen and Mike Flood. She was introduced in Series 5. Mandy is mixed race.

=== Derek Price ===
Derek Price
- Fireman Sam character
- First appearance: Double Trouble (Series 7, Episode 17; 2009)
- Voiced by: Steven Kynman (UK); Carter Treneer (US; 2014–2017); Mark Ricci (US; 2020)

In-universe information
- Gender: Male
- Family: Norman Price (cousin); Dilys Price (aunt)

Derek Price is Norman's cousin. He is first introduced in Series 7, Episode 17; Double Trouble, where he is revealed to be a goody-two-shoes, the opposite to his cousin Norman.

Derek appears in the 2009 film Fireman Sam: The Great Fire of Pontypandy. He is known as Derek Abney in the Spanish dub.

=== Hannah Sparkes ===
Hannah Sparkes
- Fireman Sam character
- First appearance: All at Sea (Series 9, Episode 1; 5 April 2014)
- Voiced by: Jo Wyatt (UK); Margaret Brock (US)

In-universe information
- Gender: Female
- Family: Joe Sparkes (father); Lizzie Sparkes (mother)
- Nationality: British (Welsh)

Hannah Sparkes is an 11-year-old girl in a wheelchair introduced in series 9. She is the daughter of Joe and Lizzie Sparkes. She is also the third child in Pontypandy to have blond hair.

=== Lily Chen ===
Lily Chen
- Fireman Sam character
- First appearance: Runaway Train (Series 8, Episode 2; 10 March 2012)
- Voiced by: Su Douglas (UK; Series 8-12); Siu-see Hung (UK; Series 13-present); Lily Cassano (US)

In-universe information
- Gender: Female
- Family: Mrs Chen (mother)
- Nationality: Chinese

Lily Chen is the toddler daughter of Mrs. Chen and the youngest character on the show. She has a plush toy called Sharky.

=== Peter Kaminski ===
Peter Kaminski
- Fireman Sam character
- First appearance: Series 14 (2022)
- Voiced by: Arthur Smith Galiano

In-universe information
- Gender: Male
- Family: Krystyna Kaminski (half-sister)
- Nationality: British

Peter Kaminski is an 11-year-old boy introduced in Series 14. He speaks with a London accent and has a Polish half-sister named Krystyna Kaminski.

He is voiced by Arthur Smith Galiano who is the child actor to voice a main character in the series.

== Animals ==
=== Rosa ===
Rosa is Bella Lasagne's cat.

=== Woolly ===
Woolly is a sheep. She was introduced as a male lamb in Series 5 before reappearing as an adult female ewe in Series 6. She is Lambykins' mother.

=== Dusty ===
Dusty is a stray dog, but later in the end of Bathtime for Dusty, he became a fire mascot.

=== Radar ===
Radar is the Pontypandy Fire Service's Dalmatian.

=== Lion ===
Lion is the Jones' cat.

=== Nipper ===
Nipper is an energetic dog who belongs to Bronwyn's sister that the former looks after.

=== Lambykins ===
Lambykins is a sheep. She was named by Sarah in "Baa Baa Baby".

=== Norris ===
Norris is a Guinea pig owned by Sarah and James. He is named Norris after Station Officer Steele because they both have similar moustaches.

== Visitors ==
=== Buck Douglas ===
Buck Douglas is a television presenter and an "alien hunter". He was introduced as the main antagonist in Alien Alert.

=== Flex Dexter ===
Flex Dexter is an actor from Hollywood, as the main antagonist in Set For Action!.

=== Professor Pickles ===
Professor Pickles is an archaeologist from the museum in the Big City. He is the main rival for Norman Price in the search for pirate treasure.
