= Fireman Sam: The Great Fire of Pontypandy =

2009 British animated film

- UK DVD cover
- Written by: Dave Ingham
- Directed by: Jerry Hibbert
- Starring: Steven Kynman; David Carling; Su Douglas; Tegwen Tucker
- Music by: David Pickvance
- Country of origin: United Kingdom
- Original language: English

Production
- Producers: Margo Merchant; Jane Liu; Chun Miao
- Editor: Steve Hughes
- Running time: 60 minutes
- Production company: HIT Entertainment

Original release
- Release: 9 November 2009

Fireman Sam: The Great Fire of Pontypandy is a 2009 British animated direct-to-video film based on Fireman Sam. It was produced by HIT Entertainment with animation production by HRTv (Note: Animation outsourced to Xing Xing Digital Corporation.). It stars the voice cast of Steve Kynman, David Carling, Su Douglas and Tegwen Tucker. The film introduced a new character Chief Fire Officer Boyce, a Chief Officer who hails from Newtown, and a new location the Lighthouse. In the film, Norman, Derek, Sarah, James and Dilys go pioneering with Trevor Evans in the forest. Norman and Derek attempt to light a campfire to cook sausages by rubbing sticks together. They are called away, not realising that the fire has caught, and this leads to the "Great Fire of Pontypandy" that the townspeople evacuated Pontypandy. It was released on 9 November 2009 by HIT Entertainment.

== Plot ==
Charlie Jones works in the lighthouse one stormy night. Wind causes him and the lighthouse door to blow over, leaving Charlie clinging onto the railings of the lighthouse. Fireman Sam and Elvis Cridlington save him and replace the broken lighthouse light. One month later, Sam is given an award by Chief Fire Officer Boyce, who offers him a promotion to head the rapid response service in Newtown. Sam promises to think about it until the end of the day. Trevor Evans tells Sam that he is going to take the Pontypandy Pioneers camping in the forest; Sam warns that the campfires are not allowed due to the very hot temperatures and the forest being too dry. Meanwhile, Dilys Price has invited Derek on a camping trip with the other Pontypandy Pioneers. As they leave, Norman sneaks some sausages into his bag, refusing to eat bugs and berries.

Helen and Mandy are having trouble getting their car to work due to Mike's other works, with the former suggesting they find the Pioneers on foot instead, as they were all planning to spend family time together. Back on the camping trip, Trevor sets up a mantrap to trap something, but after not finding anything, he leaves it without deactivating the trap. As Helen and Mandy are trying to find the campsite, Helen steps into the mantrap that Trevor set up minutes earlier. Sam and Penny Morris leave the station, but as Elvis and Radar are already there, Helen is rescued. Back at the fire station, Boyce tells Elvis how brave Station Officer Steele was fighting a fire, and this gets Elvis thinking on how to be a true hero like everyone else has been. Steele himself is informed by Sam about the Pioneers Camping Trip, and that the hot weather could set a small spark of fire into a massive flame in seconds. Sam and Elvis set signs up to warn about it, while Trevor and the Pioneers get along ahead with their walk. Upon finishing setting up the Fire signs, Elvis soon discovers that Sam may leave Pontypandy to take in the promotion at Newtown. After sneaking off, Norman and Derek cook the sausages in the campfire, ignoring all the fire warnings and sets fire to old wood using a sharp wood pin. Dilys finds them but fails to notice the fire, which soon expands.

Meanwhile, at the lighthouse, Mike forgot his phone and the hammer and soon locks himself in the lighthouse after he mends the door. He sees smoke coming from the forest and as his mobile is locked out, he uses the lighthouse to spell "FOREST FIRE" in morse code. Sam and Penny read the code and call Steele to the forest. The campsite group smell the smoke and leave the campsite to get out of the forest. The fire spreads to the campsite. Elvis and Radar find the group and follow Venus' siren, getting out of the forest before the fire engulfs it. Tom attempts to dampen the forest down in his helicopter but has no effect so Station Officer Steele warns everyone that if they cannot contain it, they will have to evacuate the town.

Norman suggests that they should call other fire engines from Newtown, but Steele tells him that they would be too far away to get there in time. By this point, the fire has completely cut the group off. Sam suggests that everyone can help by flattening the grass at the edge of the forest and keeping the heat down with the hoses. The fire reaches the edge of the forest, and the four firefighters attack it with too little effect. A falling branch nearly hits Sam, but Elvis comes to the rescue, diving and pushing Sam out of the way. The fire is soon proven to be too much for the firefighters to handle, and soon Steele then tells everyone to retreat to collect Boyce and go straight to the harbour as the fire is unbeatable and leave Pontypandy to be burned underneath the waves of fire. They take one last look at the fire station and set off. The vehicles drive to the harbour as Sam looks at the stormy clouds, pleading them to come towards the fire. As everyone gets all aboard Charlie's boat, the rain pours down and puts out the fire to everyone's delight.

As everyone celebrates not moving out of Pontypandy, Norman's backpack flies up high, opens up and Radar soon reveals the sausages that he and Derek tried to cook earlier. Everyone is shocked, with a furious Steele scolding Norman for setting the forest on fire, and Dilys says that she will make sure Norman is properly dealt with. Boyce is impressed with Sam, and the latter rejects his Newtown Fire Station offer, and decides to stay in Pontypandy because he sees the town needs him. A month following the Great Fire of Pontypandy, Steele and Boyce reward Elvis for saving Sam and for his outstanding bravery. Trevor also rewards Mandy, Sarah and James with Survivor Medals, while Norman and Derek get nothing at all, blaming each other for wanting sausages. Mike also apologizes to Mandy and Helen for not spending time with each other and agree to do so. The townsfolk hold a party to celebrate.

== Cast ==
=== United Kingdom ===
- Steven Kynman as Fireman Sam, Elvis Cridlington, Norman Price, James Jones, Derek Price and Charlie Jones
- David Carling as Station Officer Steele, Chief Fire Officer Boyce, Trevor Evans, Tom Thomas and Mike Flood
- Su Douglas as Dilys Price, Mandy Flood and Helen Flood
- Tegwen Tucker as Penny Morris, Sarah Jones and Bronwyn Jones

=== United States ===
- Andrew Hodwitz as Fireman Sam and Elvis Cridlington
- Ashley Magwood as Penny Morris
- Dave Pender as Fire Captain Steele
- Joe Marth as Dept Fire Chief Boyce
- Carter Treneer as Norman Price and Derek Price
- Sarah Lynn Strange as Dilys Price
- Scott Lancastle as Mike Flood
- Becky Shrimpton as Helen Flood
- Lily Cassano as Mandy Flood and Sarah Jones
- Jonah Ain as James Jones
- Margaret Brock as Bronwyn Jones
- Jacob James as Charlie Jones
- Mike Pongracz as Trevor Evans
- David Carling as Tom Thomas

== Reception ==
Fireman Sam: The Great Fire of Pontypandy was given a critical analysis on the website Raising Children Network. The film was rated G, and was advised for children aged 5 and up. The genre was "children's animated adventure", its length was 63 minutes and the release date was 28 October 2010. It commented on the prevalent themes, namely "the threat of fire; accidents and rescues". The review mentioned that some scenes could potentially scare or disturb children under 5, such as when "Mike falls off the roof of a house into the harbour, and struggles to stay afloat". The review concluded with some discussion points for parents with their children: "The main messages from this movie are about helping people in need and pulling together as a community. The movie also looks at the bad things that happen when you do the wrong thing. Values in this movie that you could reinforce with your children include selflessness, and care and concern for others. This movie could also give you the chance to talk with your children about real-life issues such as stealing, lighting fires, and ignoring safety instructions."
