= Progress chart =

Chart used to track a child's behavior

Progress charts are tools used in classrooms, in child care centers, and in homes across the world. They are used to promote good behavior and reward children for those behaviors, which is why they are also known as behavior charts. They can be used in a many situations and they can come in a variety of styles. Progress charts are easy to use and promote positive reinforcement.

== What is it? ==
A progress chart is a form of reward system. It involves stickers, stars or another form of marks and a chart that can be either printed or made by hand. The main goal of a progress chart is to track children's learning or behavior. It can be used to curb bad behaviors and to encourage good behaviors. It is inexpensive and can be changed to fit different situations. The child earns marks for the desired behavior and earns a reward after a certain amount is reached.

== Variety ==
The Raising Children Network agrees that you can either make a chart or you can find them on the internet. Children all have different needs when learning, so these charts can help children of any age with many things. Progress charts can be used at home as well as in daycares and in schools. These charts can be individualized throughout classrooms, where children can learn to make their own specialized ones. There are several types of charts that parents, caregivers, and educators can use.

== Types ==
- Chore chart
- Behavior charts
  - Single behavior charts
  - Multiple behavior charts
- Homework charts
- Toilet training charts

Single behavior charts can be used for all ages and is best used for learning one skill at a time. Multiple behavior charts can also be used for a variety of ages and can be used for processes that require several steps. Chore charts and behavior charts can each be used for several different situations. On the other hand, Homework charts and toilet training charts are used for what their titles suggest. Experts advise only using one chart at a time, as otherwise children and adults can get confused. These types of charts can be found on several websites which have pages of downloadable and printable charts that fit many needs and come in many styles. Charts can easily be manipulated in order to fit a child's needs.

== Benefits ==
The benefits of progress charts include motivation for a certain task, and clear expectations for that task or skill. It provides a visual picture of goal setting and helps the child to achieve the goal and be able to receive a reward. It's a solid basis to a skill that children will have to know in the future—setting goals and achieving them. The charts give children immediate feedback; this usually invokes fewer consequences.

== Rewards ==
Rewards don't have to be elaborate, they can be simple. It's best if rewards are given right away as stickers should be given right away, so that the child knows what the reward is for exactly. The goal of the reward is to keep the child continuing their behavior or skill. Dr. Virginia Shiller, a psychologist and instructor at the Yale Child Study Center and co-author of the book Rewards for Kids, says that rewards can help parents teach their children new habits. She says the key is in how the incentives are given; in setting appropriate, realistic goals; and in figuring out a strategy to achieve them.

== See also ==
- Chore chart
- Positive reinforcement
