= The Lysistrata Project =

The Lysistrata Project may refer to:

- The Lysistrata Project (protest), a 2003 peace protest in reaction to the Iraq disarmament crisis
- The Lysistrata Project (radio drama), a contemporary adaptation of Aristophanes's play

== See also ==
- Lysistrata, the play by Aristophanes
