= Penny Morris =

Penny Morris may refer to:

- Penny Morris (Fireman Sam), character in Fireman Sam
- Penny Morris, character in Babes on Broadway
