= Chore chart =

Chore charts are also called reward charts, behavior charts, chore calendars, chore lists or task lists. A chore chart is a listing used to track and organize the house work. The chart can be physical or virtual and is often a means used by parents to post chores expected of their children.

Different homes have different ways of organizing and implementing a chore system, including simple paper charts tacked on the refrigerator. There has been a lot of research, experiential evidence and discussion of chore charts. Dr. Katzenstein, the co-director of the Center for Behavioral Health at Johns Hopkins All Children's Hospital, writes that chore charts can "provide consistent and clear expectations, and a visual reminder of what needs to be done."

Adults may also use chore charts to achieve a more equitable division of labor among partners or roommates. Adults and children alike may use chore charts for motivation, by associating a visible reward or signifier with task completion.

== Age appropriate chores ==
Chore charts list household tasks, sometimes one chore chart per child and sometimes a combined list. Since children of different abilities and ages can handle various responsibilities, the chores featured on a chore chart can be divided by age. Younger children may not responsibly handle complex chores, but may still be able and want to help around the house.

== Reward for chores ==
While some parents do not give allowance or reward for household chores, there is evidence that allowance and reward helps to create financially sound adults and teach financial responsibility.

== See also ==
- Progress chart
- Kikaroo
