= List of Fireman Sam episodes =

Fireman Sam was first broadcast on BBC One on 17 November 1987. The latest broadcast was on 30 May 2025. There are 319 episodes which span sixteen series.

== Series overview ==
Series	Episodes	Originally released	
Series	Episodes	First released	Last released
1	8	17 November 1987	10 December 1987
2	8	1 September 1988	22 December 1988
3	9	15 October 1990	10 December 1990
4	8	21 October 1994	17 November 1994
5	26	4 April 2005	25 December 2005
6	26	24 November 2008	27 February 2009
7	26	4 May 2009	19 July 2009
8	26	3 March 2012	10 November 2012
9	25	7 April 2014	3 September 2014
10	25	15 February 2016	26 August 2016
11	13	18 November 2017	9 May 2018
12	13	26 October 2020	17 February 2021
13	26	4 October 2021	7 October 2022
14	26	1 November 2022	7 July 2023
15	26	21 October 2023	28 May 2024
16	26	1 October 2024	30 May 2025

== Original series (1987–1994) ==
=== Series 1 (1987) ===
No. overall	No. in series	Title	Directed by	Written by	Story By	Original release date
1	1	"The Kite"	John Walker	Nia Ceidiog	Rob Lee	17 November 1987
On a very windy day, strong winds bring down a telegraph pole, while Sarah and James' kite gets stuck on Dilys' roof. But things do not exactly according to plan.: Recording date: 8 January 1985
2	2	"Barn Fire"	John Walker	Nia Ceidiog	Rob Lee	19 November 1987
On a very hot day, Sarah and James are picking spuds for Bella. Fireman Sam wonders if he can help, but first he has to deal with a barn fire at Pandy Lane Farm.
3	3	"Trevor's Training"	John Walker	Nia Ceidiog	Rob Lee	24 November 1987
It is a routine drill for Trevor Evans on his first day in the fire service, but things do not go according to plan.
4	4	"Flat Tyre"	John Walker	Nia Ceidiog	Rob Lee	26 November 1987
After going to the sales at Newtown, Trevor suffers a flat tyre and he loses control of the spare, which causes trouble around Pontypandy.
5	5	"Camping"	John Walker	Nia Ceidiog	Rob Lee	1 December 1987
What has a frog and an oily rag got to do with camping? Fireman Sam, Sarah and James soon find out.
6	6	"Norman's Tricky Day"	John Walker	Nia Ceidiog	Rob Lee	3 December 1987
Norman Price is up to his old tricks, but this time he plays one too many.
7	7	"Lost Cat"	John Walker	Nia Ceidiog	Rob Lee	8 December 1987
Saturdays are busy enough for Bella, without having to deal with chip pan fires and lost cats.
8	8	"Telly Trouble"	John Walker	Nia Ceidiog	Rob Lee	10 December 1987
TV stardom comes to Station Officer Steele and everyone in Pontypandy is eager to watch his lecture on fire safety.

=== Series 2 (1988) ===
No. overall	No. in series	Title	Directed by	Written by	Story By	Original release date
9	1	"Treasure Hunt"	John Walker	Nia Ceidiog	Rob Lee	1 September 1988
Fireman Sam introduces Sarah and James to his new metal detector, and they get hooked on looking for treasure. Unfortunately, they manage to burst the main water pipe in the park while searching for Bella's keys.
10	2	"Sam's Day Off"	John Walker	Nia Ceidiog	Rob Lee	8 September 1988
Fireman Sam's popcorn machine seems just the ticket for going to the cinemas, until it suffers from a touch of "flumbustication".
11	3	"Thief in Pontypandy"	John Walker	Nia Ceidiog	Rob Lee	15 September 1988
Fireman Sam has mislaid his watch, Bella's necklace has disappeared and Dilys' earrings have gone missing. Can Sam solve the mystery?
12	4	"Chemistry Set"	John Walker	Nia Ceidiog	Rob Lee	22 September 1988
Norman's dream of making some of 'the pongiest stink bombs in the world' backfires with his chemistry set when Dilys sticks her nose into his laboratory.
14	5	"The Wishing Well"	John Walker	Nia Ceidiog	Rob Lee	29 September 1988
When Norman doesn't come back from picking strawberries, Trevor Evans organises a search party.
15	6	"The Great Inventor"	John Walker	Nia Ceidiog	Rob Lee	6 October 1988
Fireman Sam is all set to win the Best Inventor in Wales competition, until Norman Price plays around with one of his inventions.
13	7	"Safe with Sam"	Ian Frampton and John Walker	Nia Ceidiog	Rob Lee	19 December 1988
A fireworks display is held to celebrate the 50th anniversary of the Pontypandy Fire Station. Sam teaches valuable lessons.
16	8	"Snow Business"	Ian Frampton and John Walker	Nia Ceidiog	Rob Lee	22 December 1988
All Christmas preparations stop when the crew are called out to rescue Trevor as his bus is stuck in a snowdrift, and then Sarah and James become trapped on the ice. Note: This is a double length episode.

=== Series 3 (1990) ===
No. overall	No. in series	Title	Original release date
17	1	"Dilys' Forgetful Day"	15 October 1990
While cleaning the windows, Dilys falls off the ladder and loses her memory, meaning Norman Price has to do a lot of explaining. Meanwhile, a firefighter from Newtown is showcasing some equipment to Sam and the crew.
18	2	"Spot of Bother"	22 October 1990
Norman Price's double bluff backfires when chickenpox hits Pontypandy.
19	3	"Halloween"	29 October 1990
It is Halloween in Pontypandy, and Firefighter Penny Morris is in for a nasty shock.
20	4	"Norman's Pitfall"	5 November 1990
Near an old disused mineshaft at Pandy Lane Farm, Norman Price is fishing for chocolate cream eclairs at someone else's picnic.
21	5	"Lost Ring"	12 November 1990
Bella is very happy about the diamond ring she inherited, until it goes missing.
22	6	"All in a Good Cause"	19 November 1990
Fireman Sam is dumbstruck when all the charity money they have raised for a good cause goes missing.
23	7	"Brass Band"	26 November 1990
Only practice makes perfect when it comes to playing music, but the Fire Service band needs something quicker than that.
24	8	"Lost in the Fog"	3 December 1990
Firefighter Penny Morris becomes anxious when Sarah and James do not arrive for tea.
25	9	"Bentley the Robot"	10 December 1990
Fireman Sam's latest invention is almost superhuman, until it meets Norman Price.

=== Series 4 (1994) ===
Both the English and Welsh language versions of these episodes aired in 1994.

No. overall	No. in series	Title	Original release date
26	1	"Home from Rome"	21 October 1994
Rosa stows away in Bella's shopping trolley when she goes to Bingles' Department Store.
27	2	"Rich and Famous"	27 October 1994
Dilys Price wishes she were rich and famous, so she goes off to do some treasure hunting in the attic.
28	3	"Quarry Rescue"	1 November 1994
When Bella is making pizzas for Trevor to deliver, James falls into an old quarry.
29	4	"Deep Trouble for Sam"	3 November 1994
Fireman Sam has a week off, so he goes to weed Firefighter Penny Morris' cottage garden.
30	5	"Trevor's Bus Boot Sale"	8 November 1994
Trevor Evans is holding a "Bus Boot Sale", but becomes trapped at the old dump while suffering from the effect of some toxic fumes.
31	6	"What Goes Up"	10 November 1994
Fireman Trevor Evans gets stuck in a hot air balloon and soon it is Fireman Sam who comes to the rescue.
32	7	"Steele Under Par"	15 November 1994
When Station Officer Steele is given a letter of retirement, he decides to go golfing.
33	8	"Disaster for Dinner"	17 November 1994
A fire drill practise is being held at Bella's Café, but first there is trouble at 3 Vale Road when Fireman Sam's new robot chef catches fire.

== Revival series (2005) ==
Note: The airdates are only focusing on the English airdates. In Wales, the episodes aired earlier in October 2003.

=== Series 5 (2005) ===
No. overall	No. in series	Title	Original release date
34	1	"Danger Falling Sheep"	4 April 2005
Norman Price wants to find fame by climbing to the summit of Pontypandy Mountain, but he gets stuck on the mountain when Woolly, a falling lamb, lands on his head.
35	2	"The Big Freeze"	5 April 2005
There is a cold snap in Pontypandy and Norman Price's pet lamb Woolly is freezing. Dilys refuses to allow Norman to share his bed with Woolly, so Norman decides to make the lamb a bed of his own from his grandmother's old electric blanket - which is faulty and a fire hazard.
36	3	"Twist of Fate"	6 April 2005
Station Officer Steele takes Norman Price and Mandy Flood cave exploring, and the rest of the crew look forward to a restful afternoon. However, the peace is soon shattered when Steele follows the children into a tight room and he gets stuck, blocking the only way out.
37	4	"A Real Live Wire"	7 April 2005
Mandy Flood has her heart set on having a pet but her mother, Nurse Helen Flood, who is allergic to fur and feathers, is not as keen. However, when Mandy rescues a squirrel from Dusty's clutches, she decides to secretly smuggle it into her room, leading to her mother sneezing herself silly, and the squirrel chewing on the wire of her television set, starting a fire.
38	5	"Bug Eyed Boy from Venus"	8 April 2005
Trevor Evans tells the children that there are no such things as little green men from outer space, but Norman Price decides to scare Pontypandy's residents into thinking he is a bug-eyed alien from Venus. His joke goes too far when he stumbles into a bog and gets stuck.
39	6	"Bathtime for Dusty"	11 April 2005
Scruffy dog Dusty is chosen to be the Fire Station mascot, but first he must have a bath. Not keen on the idea of a wash, he decides to flee. Meanwhile, Mike Flood is repairing the heating system at the Mountain Rescue Centre, but accidentally sets fire to it when he leaves a lit blowtorch on the system.
40	7	"Neighbourhood Watch Out"	12 April 2005
Mandy Flood, Sarah, and James decide to start a junior Neighbourhood Watch scheme, but get rather carried away, and eventually cause trouble for Mike, who is repairing Bella's roof.
41	8	"Twitchers in Trouble"	13 April 2005
Trevor Evans is looking forward to his date with Dilys Price and decides to take her birdwatching. However, Norman Price accidentally leaves a lemonade bottle in the sun, which sets fire to the grass around it, and eventually, Trevor's birdwatching hide.
42	9	"Carnival of Junk"	14 April 2005
Mandy Flood is looking forward to the family holiday in Jamaica because she is longing to see the funfair, but she is ill due to chickenpox and the holiday is cancelled. Mike and Helen Flood find a way to cheer her up. Meanwhile, James and Sarah are playing near a rubbish tip, which leads to James' foot getting stuck under a boiler.
43	10	"Mummy's Little Pumpkin"	15 April 2005
It is Halloween and Fireman Sam gives Norman Price the biggest pumpkin in the pumpkin patch so he can make a jack-o-lantern. Norman is determined to go all out for scares and carelessly slams the door, causing his lantern to fall off the shelf and start a fire.
44	11	"Joker Soaker"	18 April 2005
There is a drought in Pontypandy, and everyone is forced to conserve their water. Naughty Norman Price receives a Joker Soaker from his uncle and starts playing tricks on Pontypandy's residents with it. Meanwhile, Dusty is looking for something to drink, but gets his head stuck in a fence.
45	12	"Fit for Nothing"	19 April 2005
When Fireman Sam invents a new exercise machine called the Joggalator, everyone wants to try it out. Meanwhile, James and Sarah are looking for Bella's cat, Rosa, and a thunderstorm is coming. They find Rosa, stuck in a barbed wire fence, and Sarah gets stuck too, while trying to free Rosa.
46	13	"Deepwater"	20 April 2005
Norman Price decides to borrow Sam's Beep-O-Matic metal detector and go treasure hunting with Mandy Flood on Pontypandy Mountain. They find a hidden treasure room and Mandy falls into it while she and Norman are digging.
47	14	"Beast of Pontypandy"	21 April 2005
After watching a television show about beasts living in Wales, Norman Price gives Woolly a mud bath and creates panic amongst Pontypandy's residents by passing him off as the Black Beast of Pontypandy. Norman's joke reaches its peak when he, Mandy, and James get "trapped" on Pontypandy Mountain with the "beast."
48	15	"Pizza Palaver"	22 April 2005
Norman Price accidentally kicks a football at Bella's chimney, sending a bird's nest into her new oven, setting fire to the chimney.
49	16	"Fun Run"	23 April 2005
A fun run has been organised for charity, but Norman Price's cheating ways lead to the other competitors, and soon himself, getting lost.
50	17	"Trouble and Squeak"	26 April 2005
Norman Price takes Squeaky the school mouse home, but Squeaky gets loose in town, and eventually gets stuck in Bella's chimney with Rosa.
51	18	"King of the Jungle"	27 April 2005
A heatwave puts Pontypandy's haystacks at risk from spontaneous combustion, so Sam invents a special thermometer for taking a haystack's temperature. The Tarzanesque jungle cry of Norman Price raises the alarm when James and Sarah end up trapped near a blazing haystack.
52	19	"Norman's Invisible Friend"	28 April 2005
Norman Price invents a fictitious friend to get double helpings of food, but it backfires at Mandy's party when her father overloads the plug socket in the kitchen, causing it to catch fire and forcing Norman to confess his new friend is not real.
53	20	"High Jinx"	29 April 2005
Norman Price uses a kite to create a wind-powered skateboard to help him with his newspaper deliveries. It backfires when he loses control of the kite and gets blown into a lake.
54	21	"The Case of the Liquorice Shoelaces"	2 May 2005
Someone has been stealing liquorice shoelaces from Dilys Price's shop and the prime suspect is Norman, but surprisingly, he is not to blame. He sets out to prove his innocence. Meanwhile, Dilys falls asleep and accidentally drops a newspaper on a space heater, setting it on fire.
55	22	"Fiery Finale"	3 May 2005
There is a talent show in Pontypandy and Norman Price is searching for an act to do in it. He gets an idea before accidentally dropping water on Elvis' electric guitar, setting the stage on fire.
56	23	"Birthday Surprise"	4 May 2005
It is Fireman Sam's birthday and everyone is preparing for a surprise party for him. Norman Price is given the task of keeping Sam out of the fire station until the party is ready, but forgets to warn Bella that the candles for Sam's birthday cake are magic candles that relight themselves.
57	24	"Firefighter of Tomorrow"	5 May 2005
Norman Price wants to be a firefighter when he grows up. He tries to convince the crew he is cut out to be a firefighter by reminding them of his "hero work" during emergencies from previous episodes, but this leads to some serious doubts. Later, Norman tries rescuing Rosa from a tree, but ends up getting stuck himself.
58	25	"Fields of Fire"	6 May 2005
Sam receives new equipment for fighting fires. It proves to be useful when careless campers fail to put out their fires in the fields, where there is no camping allowed and where Norman Price, Mandy Flood, and Dusty become trapped.
59	26	"Let It Snow"	25 December 2005
The roads to Pontypandy are blocked with snow. When the townspeople face a Christmas without a tree, Norman Price decides to try to get one, but an avalanche traps him in a cave.

=== Series 6 (2008–09) ===
No. overall	No. in series	Title	Written by	Original release date
60	1	"Paper Plane Down"	Andrew Brenner	24 November 2008 (Note: These episodes were first released as part of the DVD Fireman Sam: The New Hero Next Door, released on 24 November 2008.)
It is Fire Prevention Day in Pontypandy, but Norman has other things on his mind. He wants to spend his time making paper aeroplanes.
61	2	"Hot and Cold Running Sniffer Dog"	Andrew Brenner	24 November 2008
Mike does not believe that Radar is a rescue dog, but he is soon proved wrong after he falls and breaks his arm in the Whole Fish Cafe cellar.
62	3	"Hearts on Fire"	Andrew Brenner	24 November 2008
When Dilys goes camping with Norman and Trevor, she is spooked by her son's scary tales and in her panic starts a forest fire!
63	4	"Perilous Path"	Andrew Brenner	24 November 2008
After Sam and Tom put up signs warning everyone about some unsafe paths near the cliffs, Norman takes Mandy in search of a golden eagle.
64	5	"The New Hero Next Door"	Andrew Brenner	24 November 2008
Mandy makes a movie with Norman starring as a superhero. Sarah, who is playing the damsel in distress, is so convincing at screaming for help that Charlie rushes to her rescue.
65	6	"Santa Overboard"	Andrew Brenner	24 November 2008
After festooning the supermarket with Christmas lights, Norman persuades Dilys to fix an inflatable Santa to the roof.
66	7	"Best Foot Forward"	Andrew Brenner	1 December 2008
Norman accidentally traps his foot in some rocks while out collecting mussels on the beach. Charlie, Sarah and James try all they can to dislodge it, but his foot is stuck fast.
67	8	"Baa Baa Baby"	Andrew Brenner	8 December 2008
The boiler in the Whole Fish Cafe is not working, so Sarah takes Woolly's new lamb out for a walk in the pram. Lambikins is so well wrapped up that everyone thinks it is a real baby!
68	9	"Mother's Helper"	Andrew Brenner	15 December 2008
It is washing day in Pontypandy. In his house, Norman crams everything into the machine to do in one wash, then goes out to play.
69	10	"Cat Magic"	Andrew Brenner	22 December 2008
When Sarah, James and Bronwyn find a wishing well in the woods, they are so busy making wishes that they do not notice that Lion the cat has fallen in!
70	11	"Seeing Red"	Mellie Buse and Jan Page	29 December 2008
Nipper is causing havoc, so Sarah and Bronwyn take him for a walk along the cliffs to calm him down.
71	12	"Going Out with a Bang"	Mellie Buse and Jan Page	3 January 2009
Mandy invites everyone to a fireworks display at the Floods on Bonfire Night. She and Norman are so busy doing firework impressions, they do not realise that they are scaring Lion.
72	13	"The Wrong Smell"	Andrew Brenner	10 January 2009
Helen and Penny are hiking in the mountains, but when fog sets in and Penny hurts her ankle, their flare is not visible.
73	14	"No Nurse Like You"	Mellie Buse and Jan Page	17 January 2009
Mike is busy organising a garden party to celebrate his and Helen's wedding anniversary, but it looks as though the barbecue will be ruined.
74	15	"The One That Got Away"	Mellie Buse and Jan Page	24 January 2009
Charlie, Sarah, James and Norman discover a baby whale who has lost its mother.
75	16	"Dinosaur Hunt"	Andrew Brenner	31 January 2009
After discovering an ammonite on Pontypandy beach, Norman makes a dinosaur footprint and lures James and Sarah to a nearby cave, hoping to convince them that a dinosaur is inside.
76	17	"Floating Cart"	Andrew Brenner	9 February 2009
Norman builds a new go-cart from items that he has collected from around Pontypandy, though he has not always asked permission to use them.
77	18	"Sticky Situation"	Andrew Brenner	12 February 2009
Too impetuous to read any instructions, Norman has trouble assembling the model aeroplane kit Mandy bought him for his birthday, then gets stuck to his bedroom door.
78	19	"Cry Wolf"	Andrew Brenner	13 February 2009
After a misplaced football kick sets off the fire alarm in Dilys' shop, Norman pretends that the alarm is faulty by setting it off again.
79	20	"Sheep on the Road"	Dave Ingham	14 February 2009
While Mike mends her field's gate, Woolly is sent to stay with Norman, who is ill. When Norman and Woolly go out, Trevor's bus swerves off the road.
80	21	"Mam's Day"	Andrew Brenner	15 February 2009
Norman is too impatient to let Mike help him to make a proper Mother's Day present for Dilys. He just nails a bottle top into a piece of wood and calls it a candle holder.
81	22	"Alarm on the Beach"	Dave Ingham	21 February 2009
When James and Mandy find a crate on the beach they try to open it but end up getting James's legs trapped.
82	23	"Hot Air"	Mellie Buse and Jan Page	22 February 2009
It is a very hot day in Pontypandy and Trevor refuses to accept that his old bus may not make it up the mountain.
83	24	"Towering Inferno"	Dave Ingham	23 February 2009
A competition to see who is best at hide-and-seek goes awry as Mandy gets horribly seasick when she hides in Charlie's boat and he takes it out for a sail.
84	25	"Danger by the Double"	Mellie Buse and Jan Page	24 February 2009
When a fire starts in the forest, James and Sarah are too busy competing with each other to realise they are in danger.
85	26	"When Fools Rush In"	Dave Ingham	27 February 2009
James wants to get Bronwyn something special for her birthday so he borrows Station Officer Steele's metal detector to try and find some old coins.

=== Series 7 (2009) ===
No. overall	No. in series	Title	Written by	Original release date
86	1	"Blow Me Down"	Mellie Buse and Jan Page	4 May 2009
Fun with the friendly fireman of Pontypandy. After a sailing lesson with Penny, Norman disregards her warning and takes Dilys out for a boat trip.
87	2	"Pontypandy Extreme"	Dave Ingham	5 May 2009
Norman is upset when Trevor accidentally runs over his skateboard. Not prepared to wait until his birthday for a new board, Norman decides to try to buy one himself.
88	3	"Elvis Sings the Blues"	Lee Pressman	6 May 2009
Elvis breaks his leg dancing around the Fire Station and begins to wonder if he is really cut out to be a fireman. But then Mike Flood ends up dangling precariously from his roof.
89	4	"Fireworks for Mandy"	Lee Pressman	7 May 2009
While playing hide-and-seek in the mountains with Norman, Mandy finds a distress flare. Norman wants to let it off but Mandy resists, fearing that it could be dangerous.
90	5	"Heap of Trouble"	Mellie Buse and Jan Page	8 May 2009
For the Pontypandy Flower and Vegetable show, Mike is entering a marrow. But he did not heed Sam's advice about turning over the compost in which it is growing.
91	6	"Stuck in the Muck"	Dave Ingham	11 May 2009
Trevor's bus swerves off the road so he goes looking for help. But the mobile phones are not receiving a signal and he gets stuck - with a beast about.
92	7	"Sausages vs. Shrimps"	Laura Beaumont and Paul Larson	12 May 2009
Trevor Evans and Tom Thomas have a barbecue but when they start to get a bit competitive, Trevor sets fire to the tree - Sam must come to the rescue!
93	8	"Flood's Flood"	Laura Beaumont and Paul Larson	13 May 2009
Everyone is looking forward to karaoke night. When Mike and Station Officer Steele get into binds while working, everyone rushes to help them get back to the Whole Fish Cafe.
94	9	"Stranded"	Dave Ingham	14 May 2009
Mandy Flood and Norman Price head off to the beach with their buckets and nets challenging each other to see who will obtain the best catch of the day.
95	10	"Off Duty Sam"	Lee Pressman	19 May 2009
Sam cannot wait to get home and do his chores once he has finished work. But he will have to wait, when one thing leads to another at Dilys' shop.
96	11	"Sheepdog Trials"	Mellie Buse and Jan Page	20 May 2009
Norman tries to train Radar to be a sheepdog but fails miserably, causing Woolly and her lamb to run out into the road and making Mike Flood's van tip over.
97	12	"Norman's Ghost"	Mellie Buse and Jan Page	21 May 2009
At Halloween, Norman is looking forward to the Floods' party and determined to win the Spooking Competition by out-scaring everyone else.
98	13	"Poorly Penny"	Mellie Buse and Jan Page	22 May 2009
Penny has caught a cold, but she still tries to perform her firefighter duties. Meanwhile, the Joneses experience three incidents: Lion gets stuck on a roof, Charlie accidentally sets fire to a dustbin, and the family gets stranded at sea when Charlie's boat breaks down.
99	14	"Pirates of Pontypandy"	Dave Ingham	23 May 2009
Norman and James fall asleep and drift away out to sea when they go out in a rowboat, during a pirate's picnic.
100	15	"The Pontypandy Pioneers"	Lee Pressman	2 July 2009
Trevor takes the children on a nature walk to the Mountain Rescue Centre. A zip wire has been set up for them and when Trevor goes on it he gets stuck.
101	16	"Twitching the Night Away"	Lee Pressman	3 July 2009
Elvis is booked to sing on a local TV show and dreams of life as a singing superstar. Meanwhile Trevor and Norman are off to the woods to look for a rare bird.
102	17	"Double Trouble"	Laura Beaumont and Paul Larson	4 July 2009
Norman's cousin Derek comes to stay and appears to be a gigantic goody-two-shoes. Norman hatches a plan for revenge and sends Derek to pick some non-existent Pontypandy Pansies.
103	18	"Sailor Steele"	Mellie Buse and Jan Page	5 July 2009
Fireman Sam and the rest of the team are training Mike Flood and Charlie Jones to be reserve firemen, and Station Officer Steele is very pleased with their progress.
104	19	"Fireman James"	Laura Beaumont and Paul Larson	10 July 2009
James' fireman's radio connects to Jupiter, so he ends up solving emergencies before the crew arrives at each one. He then finds himself in deep trouble when he attempts to rescue Mike from a real fire.
105	20	"Dilys' Big Surprise"	Jennifer Upton	11 July 2009
Norman forgets his mother's birthday, so he tries to plan a party for her with Sarah and Mandy, but everything goes wrong when he tries to take charge and leaves the cake in the oven for too long after setting the timer incorrectly.
106	21	"Day at the Seaside"	Lee Pressman	12 July 2009
It is Station Officer Steele's day off from the Fire Service. Elvis persuades Sam to let him be in charge at the Fire Station. Trevor and Steele get into an argument over directions to the seaside, which leads to Trevor driving his bus into the water.
107	22	"Model Plane"	Paul Larson	13 July 2009
James lets Norman try his new model aeroplane, but Norman flies it into Station Officer Steele who demands that he not fly it in Pontypandy. James and Norman go to the Mountain Rescue Centre to fly the plane, but Norman flies it into a tree. The boys try to retrieve it, but get stuck.
108	23	"Three Legged Race"	Dave Ingham	16 July 2009
In the annual three-legged race in Pontypandy, Fireman Sam is partnered with a less-than-confident Dilys, while Norman is partnered with Mandy. Norman's attempts to cheat lead to him stepping in a gopher hole and spraining his ankle.
109	24	"Norman's Ark"	Dave Ingham	17 July 2009
The residents of Pontypandy wake up to find the whole town flooded. Norman tries to rescue Woolly, Lambykins, and Lion by himself, but falls out of his rowboat.
110	25	"Open Day"	Dave Ingham	18 July 2009
It is open day at the fire station and everyone is invited to visit and have a look around. Norman and James try to get a better view of a rescue demonstration from the roof, but end up becoming part of the demonstration when they get stuck on the roof.
111	26	"Mike's Rocket"	Jenifer Upton	19 July 2009
Mike has built a rocket and is preparing to launch it. Norman has become fascinated by Mike's project and decides to build one of his own, but forgets to add a parachute, and when he launches it, it flies into Dilys' shop.

=== Series 8 (2012) ===
No. overall	No. in series	Title	Written by	Original release date
112	1	"Bronwyn's Millionth Customer"	Laura Beaumont and Paul Larson	3 March 2012
When Sarah and James discover that the Whole Fish Café is about to have its one millionth customer, they convince Bronwyn that there should be a big celebration to mark the event. While planning the celebration, disaster strikes; the fryer sets fire to the decorations and Norman gets stuck in a giant fake cake.
113	2	"Runaway Train"	Lee Pressman	10 March 2012
When Bronwyn gives her father, Gareth Griffiths, a sausage sandwich for his lunch, she has no idea the lengths Nipper will go to for a bite. Later, Gareth's train goes on the loose when it leaves without him and with Nipper in the cab, and Elvis accidentally glues himself to a chair while trying to fix Station Officer Steele's prized mug.
114	3	"Mandy's Mountain"	Laura Beaumont and Paul Larson	17 March 2012
When Mandy reads Moose Roberts' book about his mountain climbing adventures, she decides that she wants to be a mountain climber when she grows up and makes the mistake of climbing Pontypandy Mountain on her own.
115	4	"Water Tower Inferno"	Laura Beaumont and Paul Larson	24 March 2012
Gareth is opening the Pontypandy Mountain Railway Line and Station; he has refurbished the old engine, The Pontypandy Flyer, to take people up and down the mountain. But disaster strikes when a flaming lump of coal sets some boxes, and the water tower, ablaze, threatening to put the train in danger.
116	5	"Jupiter on the Loose"	Laura Beaumont and Paul Larson	31 March 2012 (Note: These episodes were first released as part of the DVD Fireman Sam: Mountain Rescue, released on 26 March 2012.)
When the Pontypandy Pioneers go to the Fire Station to complete their fire safety badge, Norman wants to prove to his cousin Derek that he can drive a fire engine, so he takes Jupiter for a drive around town, but finds himself unable to stop.
117	6	"The Big Chill"	Laura Beaumont and Paul Larson	7 April 2012
When the power goes out at the fire station, Sam has trouble lighting a fire. Meanwhile, Norman and Mandy are building a snowman at the Floods' house and Norman decides to borrow Dilys' best scarf, but when he gets coal on it, he tries to clean it up, but ends up freezing it, and then he starts a fire in the Floods' oven while trying to melt the scarf.
118	7	"Boyce Will Be Boyce"	Lee Pressman	8 April 2012
Station Officer Steele hurts his back and Chief Fire Officer Boyce fills in his role for the day. Meanwhile, Norman tries to teach Sarah how to ride a skateboard while flying a kite at the same time, which leads to Sarah getting blown into a tree.
119	8	"Elvis in Concert"	Adam Long	14 April 2012
Pontypandy is holding a charity concert and Elvis is to be the star act. Mike and Elvis are carrying a giant wooden guitar, but they fail to see a cliff and Mike ends up falling down, clinging onto it.
120	9	"Mandy at Sea"	Adam Long	15 April 2012
Mandy wants to be a round-the-world yachtswoman, but when her mast breaks, she finds herself stranded at sea. Penny and Elvis also get stranded at sea when Neptune's motor falls off.
121	10	"The Great Guinea Pig Rescue"	Simon Nicholson	16 April 2012
Sarah and James have got a pet guinea pig and name him Norris, after Station Officer Steele's first name, but then the guinea pig escapes from his cage, gets loose in the cafe, and starts a fire by chewing through the freezer's wire.
122	11	"The Pontypandyness Monster"	Miranda Larson	3 August 2012
Sarah makes up a story about a monster to get more passengers on her grandfather's railway, which leads to some of the townsfolk floating away on an unfinished dock.
123	12	"Disastrous Dilys"	Lizzie Ennever	4 August 2012
Dilys tries her best to help Norman get his Pontypandy Pioneer fishing badge, but ends up jamming the rudder on Charlie's boat, causes Neptune to drift away, and destroys the radio.
124	13	"Charlie's Big Catch"	Adam Long	11 August 2012
Charlie takes the children on a fishing trip and catches the biggest shoal of fish ever, but his boat cannot hold the weight of the catch.
125	14	"Bessie to the Rescue"	Ian Carney	18 August 2012
Station Officer Steele discovers his old fire engine, Bessie, which turns out to be useful when Moose has an accident with a campfire and some gas canisters.
126	15	"King of the Mountain"	Adam Long	25 August 2012
Tom and Moose take the Pontypandy Pioneers on a mountain climbing expedition, but have an accident while trying to outdo each other in tree climbing.
127	16	"Lighthouse Lock Out"	Laura Beaumont and Paul Larson	1 September 2012
Norman spoils everyone's trip to the lighthouse by locking them all out on the balcony in an attempt to avoid cleaning Mike's van, which he threw mudballs at.
128	17	"Girls' Night In"	Miranda Larson	8 September 2012
Mandy offers to babysit Lily when Helen invites Mrs. Chen and Penny over for a girls' night in, but Lily behaves badly and Mandy is blamed for it. Things get worse when a curling iron sets fire to some cushions, but not before Lily steals Helen's keys.
129	18	"To Outfox a Fox"	Laura Beaumont and Paul Larson	15 September 2012
When Tom and Moose volunteer to help Mandy and Norman catch a fox in the act of stealing food, the animal scampers off with Moose's hat and Tom and Moose end up stuck in a fox hole.
130	19	"Lily Lost and Found"	Lizzie Ennever	22 September 2012
Everyone goes to the beach for a picnic, but Lily, who wants to follow Norman all day, needs help when she gets stranded on a sandbank.
131	20	"Sky Lanterns"	Simon Nicholson	29 September 2012
Mrs. Chen's class make sky lanterns for Chinese New Year, but impatient Norman's lantern starts a forest fire when he disobeys Moose's order not to launch it because of the wind direction.
132	21	"The Pontypandy Polar Bear"	Lizzie Ennever	6 October 2012
Huge footprints in the snow convince Sarah that there is a polar bear in the area, but an avalanche traps her, James, and Moose in a cave when the twins try to photograph it for a local newspaper competition.
133	22	"Ice Cold in Pontypandy"	Lee Pressman	13 October 2012 (Note: These episodes were first released as part of the DVD Fireman Sam: Snow Trouble, released on 8 October 2012.)
When Trevor is driving his bus to Newtown, he skids off the road and onto a frozen lake. Meanwhile, Elvis tries to give shelter to Woolly and Lambykins in the fire station.
134	23	"Snowball of Doom"	Lee Pressman	20 October 2012
When Norman and Derek see a video of a champion snowboarder, they decide to try snowboarding with Dilys' ironing table, but accidentally create a giant snowball, which sends Mike on the run and into a hole.
135	24	"Floodlights"	Miranda Larson	27 October 2012
Christmas is coming and there is to be a competition for the best Christmas lights in Pontypandy. The Prices and the Joneses try to outdo each other with their lights and they each end up starting a fire as a result of too many plugs in one socket.
136	25	"Norman's Halloween Heist"	Simon Nicholson	3 November 2012
Norman causes havoc on Halloween, when he tries to collect all the candy in Pontypandy. His greed gets the best of him when he tries to beat the other children to Dilys' shop and drives his go-cart into the sea again.
137	26	"Wheel of Fire"	Ian Carney	10 November 2012
Charlie is so busy correcting Gareth's haphazard preparations for the firework display that he misses a Catherine wheel nailed too tightly to the door of Bessie's shed. Note: This episode is based on the true story of Liam Renyard's bravery.

=== Series 9 (2014) ===
No. overall	No. in series	Title	Written by	Original release date
138	1	"All at Sea"	Laura Beaumont and Paul Larson	5 April 2014
It is the day of the grand opening of Pontypandy's new Ocean Rescue Centre and Station Officer Steele is taking the firefighters on a tour of the centre. As they arrive on the quay, they meet the new coastguard, Ben Hooper. Mike is preparing a fireworks show to celebrate the grand opening, but accidentally sets them off too early and gets trapped at sea.
139	2	"Battle of the Birthdays"	Adam Long	12 April 2014
Because Sarah and James cannot agree on what kind of birthday party to have, Bronwyn has decided that this year they will have two parties; James' will be a science party and Sarah's will be a football party. During both parties, however, Sarah accidentally kicks her football at James' chemistry set, which sets fire to the café.
140	3	"The Wild Cheese Chase"	Tim Bain	19 April 2014
It is the annual Pontypandy Cheese Roll Challenge (a race down a hill chasing a giant cheese wheel) and Norman really wants to win the giant cheese, but the contest rules state that only adults can enter the contest. Not wanting to follow the rules, Norman causes the cheese to roll onto a cliff and gets stuck while trying to retrieve it.
141	4	"Magic Norman"	Tim Bain	26 April 2014
Norman decides to put on a magic show at the Floods' house, but it becomes a disaster when Norman overloads an extension socket for his special effects, causing an electrical fire, then steals the batteries from the Floods' smoke alarm to use for his boom box, and accidentally leaves Mandy trapped in a box. Meanwhile, Elvis is struggling with some training sessions due to his obsession with the training dummy.
142	5	"Escape from Pontypandy Island"	Miranda Larson	10 May 2014
When the Pontypandy Pioneers go on a day trip with Trevor to Pontypandy Island, they are all desperate to prove that they will be the best explorers, but they become stranded when their boat floats away. To make matters worse, Norman sets fire to a tree while trying to prove he can send a better smoke signal than James.
143	6	"Troubled Waters"	Miranda Larson	17 May 2014
Station Officer Steele takes the day off with Gareth, Sarah, and James to go rowing, but their adventure takes a turn for the worse when they approach a waterfall. Meanwhile, the rest of the crew is struggling to finish filing Steele's reports. Note: HIT Entertainment pulled this episode in 2016, because an image of what looks like a page of the Quran is briefly depicted being tripped/stepped on at one point in the episode. It was edited to be a blank piece of paper on future airings.
144	7	"The Best Sleepover Ever"	Miranda Larson	24 May 2014
The children are having a sleepover at Mandy's house, but when Dilys accidentally packs Norman's humiliating Cuddly Sheep pyjamas instead of his Army Bob pyjamas, he tries to hide them. Later, he accidentally sets fire to the Floods' toaster while trying to toast some sandwiches, and his embarrassing pyjamas are exposed when Sam finds them.
145	8	"Whale Watch"	Laura Beaumont and Paul Larson	31 May 2014
When Bronwyn decides she needs to record some relaxing whale song, Charlie offers to take her out on the skiff to find a whale while the firefighters give the twins a tour of the Ocean Rescue Centre. Bronwyn suggests that since Ben knows so much about whales, he should come along, too. Unfortunately, Charlie, Bronwyn, and Ben get stranded at sea when their skiff tips over.
146	9	"Up, Up and Away"	Adam Long	7 June 2014
While doing some kite-flying with the other kids, Mandy is inspired to want to fly over Pontypandy Mountain. Hannah Sparkes tells her that her father, Joe, has just the thing - a hot air balloon. Unfortunately, hungry Lambykins causes the balloon to float away with her in it alone and eventually causes it to crash land in a tree.
147	10	"The Pontypandy Cup"	Laura Beaumont and Paul Larson	21 June 2014
When Joe and Mike discover that Norman is entering Pontypandy's big go-cart race, The Pontypandy Cup, they get very nostalgic about the go-carts they made when they were kids. Joe's competitiveness gets the best of him when he finds himself unable to stop his rocket-powered go-cart and it becomes a jetski when he ends up driving it into the sea.
148	11	"Treehouse Trouble"	Lizzie Ennever	28 June 2014
The Pontypandy Pioneers are working towards their construction badges and they decide to build a treehouse with the help of Mike. Norman is desperate to be the first one into the treehouse, leading to him being careless with the treehouse's supports and getting everyone stuck in it.
149	12	"Record Breakers"	Lee Pressman	5 July 2014
Station Officer Steele is taking dance classes so he can attend the Firefighter Gala. Meanwhile, Norman finds himself dangling dangerously from a bridge while trying to set a world record.
150	13	"Pontypandy Heatwave"	Adam Long	12 July 2014
It is a hot day in Pontypandy, and Joe invents many solar-powered gadgets, including a ridiculous-looking hat with a fan on it, which embarrasses Hannah. It proves to be useful when Hannah accidentally leaves a bottle in the sun, which catches fire, trapping everyone on the cliff.
151	14	"Norman's Big Fossil Adventure"	Lee Pressman	19 July 2014
Moose and the children go fossil hunting on Pontypandy Mountain, but disaster strikes when Moose falls down a ravine and gets stuck between two boulders. Meanwhile, Elvis jumps to the false conclusion that he and Penny will lose their jobs after overhearing Station Officer Steele making "cuts" - when he was actually talking about a photograph.
152	15	"Turtle Hunt"	Simon Nicholson	26 July 2014
Sam and Ben work together to fix a special camera onto the shell of a beautiful blue leatherback sea turtle, so that they can see underwater from its point of view. The camera comes in handy when Norman and Mandy, who are out turtle-spotting alone in a boat, get in trouble at sea.
153	16	"Rocky Rescue"	Simon Nicholson	9 August 2014
Trevor, the Joneses, and the Chens are going hiking with Moose on Pontypandy Mountain. However, Sarah and Lily get separated from the group and find themselves trapped on a cliff with a lamb.
154	17	"The Treasure Trap"	Miranda Larson	2 September 2014
Norman and James get lost in the fog on Pontypandy Island while looking for buried treasure.
155	18	"Stage Fright"	Miranda Larson	6 September 2014
When Sam is cast as the main lead in Mrs. Chen's play, Elvis decides to give him some tips on acting. Hannah and Norman are given the task of designing the set, but their disagreements over how to decorate the pirate ship prop lead to them floating out to sea on the prop.
156	19	"Pest In Show"	Tim Bain	16 September 2014
Pontypandy is holding a contest for its Most Talented Pet. Mandy and Sarah engage in a rivalry over whether Nipper or Lion will win. Disaster strikes when Mandy lets Nipper off his lead and chases Lion into the Whole Fish Café and they start a fire that traps them inside. It is up to Radar to rescue them.
157	20	"Hide and Seek"	Lee Pressman	23 September 2014
The children are playing hide and seek, and Norman hides in a log, but ends up tumbling down the hill in it and hits Trevor's grill, starting a forest fire by accident. Meanwhile, Elvis and Mike try to fit in the new pole after Penny accidentally damages it, but Sam has a better idea.
158	21	"One Way Street"	Lizzie Ennever	30 September 2014
Trevor takes Sarah, Hannah, and Mandy to Newtown to see a One Way Street concert. But when the bus skids off the icy road, Mandy still wants to keep going and ends up dangling from a tree over a ravine.
159	22	"Garden Force"	Simon Nicholson	13 October 2014
As a surprise for her mother, Mandy creates the "Garden Force," a team dedicated to renovating the Floods' front garden and making it the best garden in Pontypandy. Disaster strikes when they have an accident with the lawn mower and some fertiliser, which starts a fire.
160	23	"On Thin Ice"	Miranda Larson	13 October 2014
It is a snowy day in Pontypandy when Moose announces he is opening his "Winter Wonderland." Norman, Sarah, and James are very excited, but are soon disappointed to find that it is all about igloo building. They see a frozen lake nearby and skate on it, but the ice begins to break, leaving the twins stranded on it.
161	24	"Lights, Camera, Avalanche!"	Tim Bain	14 October 2014
It is snowy and Norman is directing his very first movie up on Pontypandy Mountain, starring Mandy and Sarah. Norman ignores Sam's warning not to cross the boundary ropes, and an avalanche traps him and the girls in a shed.
162–163	25–26	"The Return of Norman-Man"	Laura Beaumont and Paul Larson	26 December 2014
Norman is playing superheroes with James – Norman is Norman-Man and James is his sidekick Atomic Boy. Lion floats off in a boat and Norman rescues him, but ends up floating out to sea while holding onto the boat. Later, Norman gets stuck in a tree while trying to rescue Lion again. The next day, he creates a jet pack and tries to "rescue" James from getting stranded on the Pontypandy Flyer. This fails, too, and Norman's jet pack sets fire to the train.

=== Series 10 (2016) ===
No. overall	No. in series	Title	Written by	Original release date
164	1	"Runaway Horse"	Laura Beaumont and Paul Larson	15 February 2016
The Pontypandy Pioneers are having a race, and Norman is partnered with Mandy. Norman refuses to read the map and ends up getting Mandy and himself lost, until they see James and Sarah far ahead of them. Norman tries riding a horse to catch up with the twins, but they both end up getting stuck in a muddy ditch.
165	2	"Sam's Birthday"	Laura Beaumont and Paul Larson	15 February 2016
It is Sam's birthday and Joe is planning on giving Sam a remote control toy of Jupiter as a birthday present, but Hannah accidentally damages it. James fixes it, but when he tries it out, the remote malfunctions and the toy gets loose in Pontypandy. Hannah and James chase after it, but accidentally crash into Dilys and all three of them end up falling into the sea, along with the toy.
166	3	"Castles and Kings"	Laura Beaumont and Paul Larson	16 February 2016
The children are playing Castles and Kings, and Gareth gives them a dragon he built out of boxes and toilet paper rolls. Norman does not like it because it does not fly or breathe fire. He tries to make some modifications to the dragon to make it breathe fire, only to end up setting the entire dragon ablaze, as well as Bessie's shed.
167	4	"Pizza Pandemonium"	Laura Beaumont and Paul Larson	17 February 2016
James tries his hand at cooking pizzas for Gareth's railway gala, but makes too many and tries to cook all of them at the same time, only to start a fire in the cafe, and then Hannah's house. Note: This episode marks the return of Bella Lasagne, who has not appeared since Series 5.
168	5	"Dog Day Disaster"	Miranda Larson	18 February 2016
Norman wants to prove to Dilys how responsible he is to have a dog of his own, so he volunteers to take care of Aunty Philys' dog, Lady Pufflepaws. However, when Norman tries to get the dog to perform some tricks, they both fall into a river.
169	6	"Bus Trouble"	Andrew Viner	19 February 2016
While taking the children on a trip to the ancient ruins, Trevor's bus breaks down and tries fixing it, but he disconnects the brakes. Mrs. Chen gets impatient and tries to help Trevor, but ends up driving the bus out of control.
170	7	"Spy Games"	Tim Bain	22 February 2016
Norman is making a spy movie and has James do all the stunts, but they lead to James getting stuck in a tree upside down and nearly driving his go-cart into the sea. While filming the final scene in Hannah's garage, James accidentally sets fire to some rags with a magnifying glass and the sun's rays while tied to a chair.
171	8	"Fox on the Run"	Adam Long	23 February 2016
Lizzie tells Hannah to look after a fox while she gives Radar a check-up. Despite her mother's instructions, Hannah lets the fox out of its cage and she and Norman have to chase after it. Trevor tries to help them, but gets his feet caught in a kite string, causing him to dangerously dangle over a cliff.
172	9	"The Great Party Panic"	Miranda Larson	24 February 2016
Sarah and James organise a spooky party at the Whole Fish Café for their friends, but they cannot agree on what to use for centrepiece decorations. Sarah decides to use her old dollhouse with candles in it as the centrepiece, but it ends up setting the rest of the decorations ablaze.
173	10	"The Break-Up"	Andrew Viner	25 February 2016
Elvis and Mike break up their band to form solo acts, and when Mike's guitar machine falls apart during a show, it sets fire to the stage.
174	11	"Fiery Football"	Tim Bain	26 February 2016
The fire crew is about to have a football game with some of the Pontypandy citizens. Meanwhile, Norman has to help Bella with her pizzas, but he wants to watch the game and this leads to him being careless. Disaster strikes when he does not pay attention to some hot coals when he takes the pizzas out of the oven and ends up starting a fire.
175	12	"Lost in the Caves"	Simon Nicholson	14 March 2016
Moose and Mrs. Chen take the children on a trip to the caves under Pontypandy Mountain and Mandy hopes to see bats inside. She wanders away from the group after spotting a bat, but forgets to watch where she is going and falls into a pit.
176	13	"Shape Up and Shine"	Lee Pressman	15 March 2016
While Sam and Trevor teach the Pontypandy Pioneers about woodland fire safety, Chief Fire Officer Boyce tries to put the other firefighters through a faulty exercise routine he planned, but instead causes everyone to get injured. Meanwhile, Norman accidentally sets a fire with Trevor's grill. It gets worse when Norman and Derek use fire beaters as oars to go rowing alone and end up losing them.
177	14	"Space Train"	Tim Bain	16 March 2016
Gareth is taking Mrs. Chen and the children up to the mountains to see the Northern Lights. However, Gareth's cardboard space helmet causes the Pontypandy Flyer to leave without him again - and catch fire.
178	15	"Wicker Bear"	Adam Long	17 March 2016
Tom and Moose are making a wicker bear to try to beat the world record of the largest wicker bear held by the wild men of Newtown. Disaster strikes when Moose accidentally knocks it over onto the campfire and sets it ablaze.
179	16	"Castles in the Air"	Lee Pressman	4 April 2016
Mike inflates a bouncy castle on the beach for Fishy Fun Day, and Norman wants to play on it, but Mike tells him it needs to be secured first. Norman gets impatient and bounces on the castle with Mandy, but the wind blows the castle out to sea with the children on it. Meanwhile, Penny is away for the day, so Elvis' cousin, Jerry Lee Cridlington, fills in for her.
180	17	"Ice Hockey Meltdown"	Simon Nicholson	5 April 2016
Mike builds an ice rink in his front yard so the children can play hockey on it. Norman cannot skate, so he uses an inflatable penguin to help him, but it causes problems when it knocks over several floodlights and starts a fire, trapping Norman on the rink.
181	18	"Float Your Boat"	Ross Hastings	6 April 2016
Tom, Charlie, and the twins spend the day at the beach, but when Tom takes a rest on his raft, he finds out that he has been washed out to sea when he wakes up.
182	19	"Froggy Fantasy"	Simon Nicholson	7 April 2016
Norman is jealous that James is the star of the Froggy Fantasy Show and tries to take over by trapping him in the changing room, but accidentally sets fire to the pool deck. Meanwhile, Elvis has come down with a cold and tries to perform his firefighting duties with it.
183	20	"Dashing Through the Snow"	Miranda Larson	8 April 2016
It is Christmas in Pontypandy, and Gareth takes the children to Pontypandy Mountain for a Christmas surprise, but they fail to receive a warning about a heavy snowstorm.
184–185	21–22	"The Treasure of Pontypandy Pete"	Laura Beaumont and Paul Larson	2 May 2016
When Sam tells the children the story of Pontypandy Pete's treasure, Norman desperately wants to find it. Meanwhile, Joe is testing out his new submarine, which runs out of power. When the firefighters rescue him, they discover the wreck of the Pontypandy Pearl, Pontypandy Pete's ship. Professor Pickles, the president of the Newtown Museum discovers a book that will lead him to the treasure, but Norman and Hannah manage to sneak a peek at it, and the race is on to find it. Norman and Professor Pickles manage to find the treasure at the same time, but they lose it when a mine car traps them onto a cliff and falls into the river.
186	23	"Big Top Norman"	Tim Bain	3 May 2016
Norman decides to put on a circus show in Pontypandy Park, which he promises will be "the greatest show on Earth," but his audience is less than impressed by it. The grand finale of Norman's show leads to a flock of sheep stampeding through Pontypandy.
187	24	"Paddle On"	Ross Hastings	4 May 2016
Ben and Hannah are having a kayaking race to the Northern Buoy and back. The current proves to be too strong for Ben, and he strains his shoulder.
188	25	"Day of the Penguin"	Laura Beaumont and Paul Larson	13 June 2016
When a penguin escapes from Newtown Zoo, Elvis really hopes he will see it. Norman and Mandy find the penguin first, waddling across the beach. Norman wants to keep it in his room, but it ends up making a mess, so he decides to take it to the pool, but he accidentally leaves it behind at the shop, where Dilys has an accident with some flaming candles and boxes upon being startled by the penguin.
189	26	"Pontypandy in the Park"	Lee Pressman	26 August 2016
The residents of Pontypandy have gathered in Pontypandy Park for the annual town festival. Mike accidentally sets the fireworks tent ablaze while trying to dry a painting with a heater.

=== Series 11 (2017–18) ===
No. overall	No. in series	Title	Written by	Original release date
190	1	"The Prince in Pontypandy"	Laura Beaumont and Paul Larson	18 November 2017
Pontypandy is abuzz with excitement when a royal prince comes to visit and the Pontypandy Fire Service are given the responsibility of organizing the event, but Elvis and Sam are having a hard time keeping the red carpet clean. Meanwhile, Tom and Moose are hiking with the Pontypandy Pioneers, but Tom falls down a ravine and injures his shoulder while crossing a rope bridge (courtesy of a hungry sheep chewing through the rope). Tom ends up getting rescued by the prince himself, who is also a helicopter pilot.
191	2	"Norman-Man vs. Firedog"	Laura Beaumont and Paul Larson	10 February 2018
Joe has invented a new robotic dog called the Firedog 2000 to help in emergency situations that are too dangerous for Radar, but it proves to be a handful for him. Norman is convinced that he has superpowers as Norman-Man, so he tries using them to handle the malfunctioning Firedog. However, it ends up chasing Norman and setting fire to Joe's garage and itself.
192	3	"Cadet Catastrophe"	Laura Beaumont and Paul Larson	11 February 2018
Ellie takes the Junior Cadets into the woods for a training day, but James is not convinced Ellie has experience with fire safety. He tries calling Sam from a tree to ask about Ellie's firefighting experiences (and get a better mobile phone signal) but ends up getting stuck. While Ellie rescues him, Mandy and Sarah disobey her instructions not to touch anything and cause a petrol canister to roll into the campfire, which explodes and starts a forest fire.
193	4	"Monster Mania"	Laura Beaumont and Paul Larson	12 February 2018
Norman steals Joe's submarine to find and film the Pontypandyness Monster, but he ends up crashing the submarine at the bottom of the lake. To make matters worse, it starts filling up with water. Meanwhile, Ellie accuses Elvis of blocking Penny while being interviewed on the news during the crew's previous rescue.
194	5	"Wally Wizzo"	Tim Bain	13 February 2018
Norman is trying to become an online sensation known as Wizard Wally Wizzo, but his stunts lead to him getting stuck in a tree upside down, then starting a forest fire, and finally, dangling dangerously from a zipline over a waterfall. Meanwhile, the firefighters are struggling to test a new operating system at the Mountain Rescue Centre.
195	6	"The Why Files"	Laura Beaumont and Paul Larson	14 February 2018
Norman and Hannah start a new detective agency called the Why Files, and they believe there are mysterious people on the beach contacting aliens. The mysterious people turn out to be Bronwyn, Gareth, Mrs. Chen, and Professor Pickles stargazing; they are trying to discover and name a new star, but end up getting stranded at sea when their rowboat tips over.
196	7	"Pontypandy Slickers"	Miranda Larson	1 May 2018
Moose takes the children on a Wild West adventure and Hannah gives Mandy some horse riding lessons, but Mandy finds herself in trouble when she and her horse fall down a ravine.
197	8	"Who Let the Cat Out?"	Miranda Larson	2 May 2018
When Sam rescues a cat from a drain, Hannah, Mandy, and Norman are given the task of looking after it. But the cat's stench overwhelms Norman, so Mandy lights a scented candle to get rid of the smell. However, the cat will not let them watch a movie in peace, so Norman lets it out of the cage. While trying to get the cat back in the cage, Norman accidentally knocks the lit candle over and starts a fire.
198	9	"Wrong Turn Dilys"	Miranda Larson	3 May 2018
The Junior Cadets are up at the Mountain Activity Centre so they can have a ride in Wallaby 2. Norman, however, is late, and Dilys tries to get him there, but ends up taking him to the Mountain Rescue Centre by mistake, just as Tom is leaving. The Prices try to beat him to the Mountain Activity Centre, but Dilys drives too fast and ends up getting her car stuck in a tree over a ravine.
199	10	"Night of the Norman"	Tim Bain	4 May 2018
Norman watches a scary zombie movie and believes that James, Hannah, and Mandy became zombies, but they have actually caught colds. Norman tries to signal for help using a distress flare, only to start a fire in the Floods' house.
200	11	"Alien Bug Hunt"	Laura Beaumont and Paul Larson	7 May 2018
The children become obsessed with a new Alien Bug Hunt Game and attempt to be the first ones to complete it in Pontypandy. However, they find themselves competing against Charlie and Mike, who beat them to every spot in the game, frustrating Norman. The final spot is out at sea, and Norman decides to steal Neptune to beat Charlie and Mike to the spot, but the children end up getting lost and James falls overboard.
201	12	"Blast from the Past"	Tim Bain	8 May 2018
Station Officer Steele is directing a movie about his childhood and Norman wants to be the star of the show. Throughout the show, Norman refuses to share the spotlight with his co-stars. He gets into an argument with James and ends up setting the stage - and the Mountain Activity Centre - ablaze with the spotlight.
202	13	"James and the Giant Pumpkin"	Laura Beaumont and Paul Larson	9 May 2018
Pontypandy is holding a giant vegetable competition and the children have grown a giant pumpkin. They try transporting the pumpkin on a large trolley, but it ends up running loose in Pontypandy with James on it. Meanwhile, Norris the guinea pig gets loose in Pontypandy, too.

=== Series 12 (2020–21) ===
No. overall	No. in series	Title	Written by	Original release date
203	1	"Norman Price, Ace Reporter"	Laura Beaumont and Paul Larson	26 October 2020
Norman, Sarah, and Mandy set out to look for a big scoop to submit to the Pontypandy Planet. Norman decides to interview Joe about his new rocket-powered pogo stick, but Norman gets impatient and decides to test the pogo stick out himself, only to start bouncing out of control around Pontypandy. The pogo stick then bounces on its own into Dilys' shop and starts a fire, trapping her inside.
204	2	"The Zipline of Doom"	Laura Beaumont and Paul Larson	26 October 2020
Norman and Mandy get bored during Moose's Mountain Adventure activities, so they sneak off to try the Zipline of Doom. Norman forgets to put on a harness, and he falls off the zipline and onto a tree. Meanwhile, at the Mountain Rescue Centre, Tom is struggling to land Wallaby 2 due to Woolly refusing to get off the helipad.
205	3	"Brothers Weekend"	Laura Beaumont and Paul Larson	27 October 2020
Sam and Charlie try to spend a quiet weekend on Pontypandy Island, but it backfires when they have to spend it with the Junior Cadets, led by Station Officer Steele and Elvis. Things get worse when James lights a spark with some flintstones, which then starts a forest fire.
206	4	"Red Hot Chilli Nibbles"	Laura Beaumont and Paul Larson	27 October 2020
It is Helen's younger brother, Police Chief Malcolm Williams', first day in Pontypandy, and the firefighters are throwing a welcome party for him. However, the party goes downhill when Bronwyn's red hot chilli nibbles turn out to be too fiery for everyone's taste. When Bronwyn tries to make more chilli nibbles, she ends up starting a grease fire in the Wholefish Cafe as a result of her rushing.
207	5	"Great Billboard of Fire"	Darren Jones	28 October 2020
On the same day, Norman is putting on a magic show and Mike is putting on a drumming show. Norman and Mike refuse to cooperate, so they end up competing to promote their shows. Norman uncouples Mike's electric billboard from his van, and the billboard suddenly catches fire and starts rolling downhill towards a fuel truck down at the quay.
208	6	"Pioneer Peril"	Laura Beaumont and Paul Larson	29 October 2020
The Pontypandy Pioneers are trying to earn their raft building badge, but Norman refuses to follow the instructions on building the raft. Things get worse when James' faulty tablet charger sets the grass and trees near the river ablaze. Meanwhile, Elvis accidentally gets Station Officer Steele's shirt dirty three times.
209	7	"Space Sandwich"	Laura Beaumont and Paul Larson	30 October 2020
Hannah, James, and Sarah launch a sandwich into space, which starts an unexpected rescue mission when their space images capture a distress flare, which was launched by Tom after getting stranded on Pontypandy Mountain due to Wallaby 2 breaking down.
210	8	"Operation Sea Turtle"	Laura Beaumont and Paul Larson	13 February 2021
A sea turtle has been spotted off the coast of Pontypandy and the firefighters are doing their part to clean up the ocean. Meanwhile, Norman and Hannah accidentally drop Joe's binoculars into the sea, and Hannah and Joe use their submarine to retrieve the binoculars, but they get stranded when the submarine runs out of power.
211	9	"Escape from Dinosaur Island"	Laura Beaumont and Paul Larson	13 February 2021
It is Dinosaur Adventure Day, and Professor Pickles has taken the children to look for fossils on Pontypandy Island. But when Derek scares Norman, Norman decides to get back at Derek with a fake dinosaur, which gets Derek stranded on a cliff ledge.
212	10	"Caribbean Cookout"	Laura Beaumont and Paul Larson	14 February 2021
Malcolm is joining the Wild Men of Pontypandy for a cookout. But when Nipper steals Malcolm's barbeque chicken and they try to get it back, Moose accidentally causes the grill to roll down the hill and into the train station where the grill starts a fire.
213	11	"Blazing a Trail"	Darren Jones	15 February 2021
On a very hot and dry day, Malcolm, Norman, and the Floods go hiking on Pontypandy Mountain, but their adventure is cut short when Norman accidentally leaves a magnifying glass in the sun, which starts a forest fire. To make matters worse, Mike trips on a rock and twists his ankle.
214	12	"Deputy James"	Laura Beaumont and Paul Larson	16 February 2021
When James becomes Malcolm's deputy for the day, they end up with a real case to solve; food has been disappearing around Pontypandy. The thief turns out to be a horse named Buttercup, who was brought in for an animal rescue demonstration. But when James tries to arrest her, he ends up on her back and racing through Pontypandy.
215	13	"Ukulele Crazy"	Laura Beaumont and Paul Larson	17 February 2021
When Sarah tries to turn Trevor into a ukulele rock star, the filming of his first video goes wrong and he and Moose find themselves approaching a waterfall.

=== Series 13 (2021–22) ===
In October 2020, a thirteenth series of Fireman Sam was greenlit by WildBrain and Mattel Television for a June 2021 release and delivery window. This is the first series since the tenth to feature twenty-six episodes.

No. overall	No. in series	Title	Written by	Original release date
216	1	"Norman Burns Up the Dancefloor"	Paul Larson and Laura Beaumont	4 October 2021
Norman, hiding from Lily who's eager to dance with him at the Disco, accidentally sets fire to the Wholefish Café, trapping Bronwyn and Lion upstairs!
217	2	"First Aid Fiasco"	Paul Larson and Laura Beaumont	4 October 2021
When Trevor is injured during first aid training with the Pioneers, know-it-all James panics, runs off and before long, needs rescuing himself!
218	3	"Car Wash Chaos"	Paul Larson and Laura Beaumont	5 October 2021
When the kids set up a car wash competition, Sarah finds herself trapped in Nurse Flood's car when it rolls into the sea at the beach with the tide coming in. Time to call Ocean Rescue!
219	4	"Firework Party"	Darren Jones	5 November 2021
It is time for the annual fireworks night in Pontypandy. The Sparkes learn that the safest way to enjoy fireworks is at the official public display!
220	5	"Pizza in the Park"	Sam Barlow	6 October 2021
It is the day of the Pontypandy Pizza in the Park contest! When Charlie drops burning hot embers, the fire brigade race to the park to put out the blaze.
221	6	"New Dog on the Block"	Miranda Larson	7 October 2021
Sarah is trying to train Nipper to high-five on command. But when she isn't paying attention, Nipper wanders off and sparks an oven fire with his paw!
222	7	"Too Many Peas, Too Many Plugs"	Paul Larson and Laura Beaumont	8 October 2021
When Dilys overloads a socket at the Cut Price Store and starts a fire, Mandy learns that every job on the Fire Rescue team is the most important job!
223	8	"Pioneer Party"	Paul Larson and Laura Beaumont	11 October 2021
When Gareth takes the kids on a hike for the 50th anniversary of the Pontypandy Pioneers, they end up lost in the mountains and need to be rescued!
224	9	"Sparkes in the Sky"	Paul Larson and Laura Beaumont	12 October 2021
Hannah uses her dad's JoeJet2000 to propel their hot air balloon, but she cranks it up to the maximum and heads out to sea and it is up to the Ocean Rescue team to rescue them and get them back to safety.
225	10	"Hold Your Horses"	Miranda Larson	25 October 2021
When Mandy, Norman, and Sarah climb too far up a rocky hill in search of the rare Pontypandy Pansy, they'll need a little horsepower to get back down!
226	11	"Stand Up to Be Rescued"	Ross Hastings	26 October 2021
Wanting the inflatable paddleboard all to himself, James takes it out on the river alone and is swept out to sea. Time to call Ocean Rescue!
227	12	"The Why Files 2: The Beast of Pontypandy Mountain"	Paul Larson and Laura Beaumont	1 February 2022
Norman and Hannah are inspecting a strange sound in the woods. However, it isn't as scary as a forest fire.
228	13	"The Haunted Hayride"	Paul Larson and Laura Beaumont	2 February 2022
Sarah, Hannah and Mike are sent on a massive hayride on a runaway cart when Norman scares the Horse pulling it!
229	14	"Norman and the Sea"	Paul Larson and Laura Beaumont	3 February 2022
Jodie Phillips, the new Marine Biologist of Pontypandy, takes the children out to learn about the depths of the Pontypandy sea in search of a rare spotted Ray. Meanwhile, Charlie and Mike need rescuing when Charlie's Boat springs a leak.
230	15	"The Hunt for the Lesser Spotted Wader"	Paul Larson and Laura Beaumont	4 February 2022
Mike gets himself into trouble when trying to spot a rare creature. the Ocean Rescue team will need to use their new Hovercraft to rescue him.
231	16	"Fire on the Water"	Darren Jones	28 May 2022
An oil fire breaks out in the water during Professor Pickles' search for an ancient cannon.
232	17	"Riptide Rescue"	Paul Larson and Laura Beaumont	28 May 2022
Jodie and Hannah get stranded while looking inside a sea cave.
233	18	"Dog Versus Sheep"	Ross Hastings	29 May 2022
Garath, Sarah and James attempt to train Nipper to be a good sheepdog, however, Nipper accidentally causes Woolly to escape, and both get stranded on a cliff.
234	19	"The Lock In"	Sam Barlow	30 May 2022
During the Pontypandy Police Station Open Day, James and Mandy accidentally get locked up and when they find out that Station Officer Steele has gone missing, they must find a way to report the emergency.
235	20	"Pontypandy Pickle Paddle"	Ross Hastings	31 May 2022
Professor Pickles goes with the Pontypandy Pioneers on an adventure remnant of his ancestors, but soon gets himself into trouble when he goes climbing and gets stuck on a cliff.
236	21	"The Last Straw"	Miranda Larson	1 June 2022
When Sarah resorts to quickly getting her chores done at the vet centre with a leaf blower, she forgets to turn it off and it causes a fire.
237	22	"Hoop Splash"	Darren Jones	3 October 2022
Trevor teaches the kids how to Hoop Trundle. However, when trying to beat the kids, he trips up and is swept out in the river.
238	23	"Beware of the Fox"	Paul Larson and Laura Beaumont	4 October 2022
Malcolm joins Tom and Moose as part of The Wild Men of Pontypandy. However, they cause a forest fire with their campfire when the Fox outfoxes them once again.
239	24	"Calendar Challenge"	Paul Larson and Laura Beaumont	5 October 2022
Everyone is taking part in the Pontypandy Calendar photo contest. However, Mrs. Chen's attempts to win the prize ends up with her on a surfboard!
240	25	"Seagull Shenanigans"	Zahara Andrews	6 October 2022
A Seagull causes trouble at the community litter pick, and causes the children to get stranded on an island.
241	26	"Radio Mandy"	Paul Larson and Laura Beaumont	7 October 2022
Mandy causes false problems into real ones on her radio show, leading to a road accident and a fire.

=== Series 14 (2022–23) ===
No. overall	No. in series	Title	Written by	Original release date
242	1	"The Pontypandy Bee Project"	Unknown	1 November 2022
Mandy and James make Bee Hotels. However, Mandy ends up causing a fire at the watermill.
243	2	"The Moon Men Are Coming"	Unknown	2 November 2022
When he believes that Moon Men are attacking Pontypandy, Norman causes a fire in Joe's garage!
244	3	"The Fastest Food"	Unknown	3 November 2022
Mandy goes out of control when trying to become the fastest delivery person.
245	4	"Snap and Spot"	Unknown	4 November 2022
Tom Thomas gets into a new birdwatching app which soon leads him into trouble when he gets stuck on a cliff. It is up to Pontypandy's new pilot Krystyna to save the day!
246	5	"Sergeant Sarah"	Unknown	7 November 2022
Sarah is helping Rose Ravani and learns how important sergeants are when Garath gets lost.
247	6	"Moose's Sleepout Challenge"	Unknown	8 November 2022
Moose does a sleepout challenge for charity. However, James' craving for marshmallows causes a forest fire.
248	7	"Run Norman Run"	Unknown	9 November 2022
It is the day of the Pontypandy Fun Run. However, the public address system used for the event catches fire and sends the event into jeopardy.
249	8	"The Ancient Pontypandy Way"	Unknown	10 November 2022
When a fire causes a quest to turn into a problem, the firefighters use this opportunity to try out their new uniforms!
250–251	9–10	"Pontypandy Wonderland"	Unknown	10 December 2022
It is Christmas Eve in Pontypandy and Sarah is preparing for a Pontypandy Wonderland, but a snow machine causes problems for her and Hannah!
252	11	"Cave Calamity"	Unknown	13 February 2023
Norman gets stranded in the caves when attempting to finish his Sea Life spotting project by the rising tide.
253	12	"Swift Drift"	Unknown	14 February 2023
Norman and Krystyna's younger brother Peter get lost at sea when their ship starts to sink, but Krystyna is here to save the day.
254	13	"Let's Go Fly a Kite"	Unknown	15 February 2023
When Peter fixes Joe's giant kite, James has a go flying it, but soon gets his wrist caught in the rope and is sent flying away with it!
255	14	"Go Team Wildman"	Unknown	16 February 2023
A team building exercise soon turns real when the Wildmen of Pontypandy get into a bit of a river predicament.
256	15	"Dilys's Sizzling Sauce"	Unknown	17 February 2023
Dilys leaves her eye off the stove at the store, causing a fire that traps Norman upstairs.
257	16	"On the Rocks"	Unknown	27 May 2023
An underwater shoot goes wrong when Ben gets wedged in the rocks, just as the tide starts coming in!
258	17	"Dinosaur Danger"	Unknown	28 May 2023
The hunt for dinosaur bones leads to a search and rescue mission with the Police Helicopter, FireSwift, Radar and Shadows.
259	18	"The Pontypandy Hat Parade"	Unknown	29 May 2023
As Norman leaves the house, the giant hat he made for the Pontypandy Hat Parade gets stuck in the door, just as the sitting room goes up in flames!
260	19	"I'm the Captain"	Unknown	30 May 2023
When Norman and Mandy argue over who should be the captain, they cause the air-intake on Charlie’s fishing boat to overheat.
261	20	"Tidal Turmoil"	Unknown	31 May 2023
Hannah and Norman help at the Pontypandy Vets but end up losing the sheep and Prince the Horse, who gets stuck in sinking mud at the tidal flats.
262	21	"Norman Takes Off"	Unknown	3 July 2023
When a class tour of the airport goes wrong, it is up to Norman to use his gaming skills to control FireSwift until the Rescue Team arrives!
263	22	"Baking Blunder"	Unknown	3 July 2023
The Pontypandy Pioneers bake up a storm to earn their baking badges, but when a greasy oven bursts into flames, they call the rescue teams.
264	23	"Keep Calm and Upward Octopus"	Unknown	4 July 2023
Despite constant interruptions, Mandy tries to stay calm and earn her yoga badge until disaster strikes and she needs to be rescued from a cliff ledge.
265	24	"Go Kart Challenge"	Unknown	5 July 2023
A Go-Cart Challenge goes topsy-turvy when Peter's Go-cart catches fire and sets ablaze everything in its path!
266	25	"The Mystery of the Pontypandy Werefox"	Unknown	6 July 2023
The Why Files Norman and Hannah investigate a mystery involving spilled milk, a half-eaten sausage roll, and strange doglike footprints.
267	26	"Steele's Big Day"	Unknown	7 July 2023
When Joe struggles to get the hang of his drone display for Station Officer Steele's anniversary party.

=== Series 15 (2023–24) ===
No. overall	No. in series	Title	Written by	Original release date
268	1	"The Hot Potato"	Unknown	21 October 2023
The kids learn how to cook potatoes outdoors, but their hunger gets the better of them. Meanwhile, fire team is introduced to the new Jupiter.
269	2	"Boar Breakout"	Unknown	22 October 2023
When one of Farmer Annie's boars escapes, she tries to rescue it, and now they're both drifting away into the river!
270	3	"Seal Watch"	Unknown	23 October 2023
James is hoping to spot a seal, but his Dad's binoculars prove to be more trouble then they seem.
271	4	"Floating Away"	Unknown	24 October 2023
Norman and Mandy go off to retrieve their wildlife journal.
272 273	5 6	"Mystery at Pumpkin Hollow"	Unknown	25 October 2023
The Why Files and the Detectives are both on the case within Pumpkin Hollow, with strange sounds and disappearing pumpkins to boot.
274	7	"Wholefish Theatre"	Unknown	26 October 2023
Sarah holds a lunchtime show outside the Wholefish Cafe, which ends up proving to be a bit of a hot one!
275	8	"Find the Fossil"	Unknown	27 October 2023
Peter finds what appears to be a Dinosaur fossil; but Nipper soon takes it, believing the fossil to be a bone.
276	9	"Wild Snaps"	Unknown	28 October 2023
It is the day of PC Malcolm's Wildlife Photo Challenge, but which team will win?
277	10	"Country Market Chaos"	Unknown	1 November 2023
During Pontypandy's first-ever country market, Sarah and James compete with Mandy and Norman to sell the most items.
278	11	"Great Reading Rescue"	Unknown	11 March 2024
It is the grand opening of the community library, but they are out of books. With a mission set by Mandy, can Norman and James save the opening?
279	12	"Perfect Pioneer Tea"	Unknown	11 March 2024
Mandy and Peter accidentally start a forest fire when trying to gain a new Pioneer badge - making a cup of tea.
280	13	"Beaver Blackout"	Unknown	12 March 2024
Beavers cause a blackout in Pontypandy, and Dilys is unsure what to do with her freezer supplies.
281	14	"Calamity Cat"	Unknown	13 March 2024
Mandy offers to look after Penny's cat Miss Pawdry, but she soon escapes.
282	15	"Dog Versus Cats"	Unknown	14 March 2024
Mandy and Sarah help create a film showcasing the difference between dogs and cats.
283	16	"The World's Most Dangerous Picnic"	Unknown	15 March 2024
Peter's picnic games on Annie's Farm prove to be a bit disastrous.
284	17	"A Day with Scoop Dooley"	Unknown	18 March 2024
Mandy and Sarah are helping Scoop Dooley make an exciting new news story about Annie's wild boars, but Scoop decides that the best way is for her to get footage from a tree. Meanwhile, Elvis is trying to get Hydrus used for more emergencies.
285	18	"Call of the Mud Men"	Unknown	19 March 2024
While trying to rescue Lucy the wild boar, Moose ends up needing a rescue himself.
286	19	"A Stinky Rescue"	TBD	2024
Trevor leads a group hike to the beaver dam and Pontypandy Mountain, but without using a compass and soon without a map, either!
287	20	"The Great Robot Race"	TBD	2024
Norman, Hannah, James and Peter are having their robot race but James and Peter don’t want to lose again because they don’t want to see Norman do his robot dance. Meanwhile Elvis and Radar are stuck on a runaway Titan.
288	21	"Hide and Rescue"	TBD	2024
When Pontypandy is having an hide and seek, The rescue team needs to find where they hiding, But when Annie is good at hide and seeking, He found Prince that she let Mandy and James on, To make Prince to cross the river when James fall over in the water, And towards the waterfall, And its up to the rescue team to save him.
289	22	"Pontypandy Party Planners"	TBD	2024
Today is Peter Kaminski’s birthday in Pontypandy, so everyone is preparing his birthday party at the pools in Pontypandy Park. Whilst Hannah makes people start to rush and some of them make mistakes, Mike falls down the ladder and sets the party and the pool on fire!
290	23	"The Seven Wonders Of Pontypandy"	TBD	2024
The Floods, Malcom and Norman are out for a camping trip but Mandy and Mike decide to see all the seven wonders of Pontypandy in one weekend. Meanwhile Sam and Elvis are training Radar to be a water rescue dog.
291	24	"Something Fishy"	TBD	2024
James looks for a thief who has been stealing fish from his mum. On realising that his prime suspect is a seal, he seeks Jodie's help.
292	25	"Annie's Animal Parade"	TBD	2024
293	26	"Grown-Ups do the Silliest Things"	TBD	2024
Joe Sparkes attempts to use his Rocket Blaster 3000, but Norman and Hannah want it to go really fast so they can get more views than Derek, but someone is hiding inside the Rocket Blaster and needs saving from the rescue team.

=== Series 16 (2024–25) ===
No. overall	No. in series	Title	Written by	Original release date
294	1	"Come to Pontypandy"	Unknown	1 October 2024
295	2	"The Way of the Wild Walkers"	Unknown	1 October 2024
296	3	"Star Spotter of the Year"	Unknown	2 October 2024
297	4	"The Bravest Bird"	Unknown	3 October 2024
298	5	"Woolly in the Wind"	Unknown	4 October 2024
299	6	"The King of Pontypandy"	Unknown	7 October 2024
300	7	"Mountain Cat"	Unknown	8 October 2024
301	8	"Over the Ledge"	Unknown	9 October 2024
302	9	"Back to the Stone Age"	Unknown	10 October 2024
303	10	"The Big Surprise"	Unknown	11 October 2024
304	11	"Guinea Pig Peril"	Unknown	14 October 2024
305	12	"Herding Hazard"	Unknown	15 October 2024
306	13	"It Came from the Sea"	Unknown	16 October 2024
307	14	"Kite Catastrophe"	Unknown	3 March 2025
308	15	"Pink Pollock"	Unknown	4 March 2025
309	16	"Sketching the Wildlife"	Unknown	5 March 2025
310	17	"Grandpa Day"	Unknown	6 March 2025
311	18	"Sailing Lesson"	Unknown	7 March 2025
312	19	"Moose Versus the Mole"	Unknown	10 March 2025
313	20	"Hannah's Recipe for Disaster"	Unknown	24 May 2025
314	21	"The Big Scoop"	Laura Beaumont and Paul Larson	25 May 2025
315	22	"History Trails"	Laura Beaumont and Paul Larson	26 May 2025
316	23	"The Future of the Seas"	Laura Beaumont and Paul Larson	27 May 2025
317	24	"The Taste of Pontypandy"	Laura Beaumont and Paul Larson	28 May 2025
318	25	"Magic Mandini and the Great Normanski"	Laura Beaumont and Paul Larson	29 May 2025
319	26	"The Big Show"	Laura Beaumont and Paul Larson	30 May 2025
