= Ayesha Antoine =

English actress

- Born: Essex, England
- Occupation: Actress
- Years active: 1995–present

Ayesha Antoine is an English actress. She is known for portraying Rachel Baptiste in Holby City, and Poppy Silver in Grange Hill.

== Background ==
Antoine was born in Essex, England. She is of English, Dominican, and Welsh descent. In 1998 Antoine studied Psychology and English at the University of Manchester. After graduating, she returned to London to restart her career.

She said:

"It’s good to have another trick up your sleeve. I have always been interested in psychology, and I’d love to be able to do something with child psychology. Maybe do both acting and psychology, who knows?"

A hyperactive child (learning the violin and piano as well as attending acting and dance classes), at the age of eight she entered a National Talent Contest which was televised on the Saturday morning BBC children's show, Going Live!. Dancing, singing and rapping to Salt'n'Pepa's 'Express Yourself' was Antoine's first television appearance.

== Career ==
=== Television ===
Antoine began her television career in the 1990s playing Poppy Silver in Grange Hill. At this time she also made her first appearance in Holby City. Other television credits include the role of Kelly Grogan in sitcom pilot Placebo and a husband-beating shoplifter in The Bill.

In 2008, Antoine guest starred as Dee Dee Blasco in the Doctor Who episode "Midnight", an experience she described as: "so much fun…it’s a brilliant show and I loved every minute." She joined the regular cast of Holby City in 2008, playing staff nurse Rachel Baptiste.

In 2009, Antoine appeared in BAFTA winner Paul Whitehouse's new series Down The Line.

=== Radio ===
In 2005, Antoine won the Norman Beaton Fellowship. She was a member of the BBC Radio Drama Company for six months and lent her voice to over twenty five radio dramas including The Lysistrata Project, Hold My Breath, Westway, The No.1 Ladies Detective Agency, The Fountain Overflows and Father & Son.

=== Other ===
In 2011, she joined the cast of Big Finish Productions' Bernice Summerfield audio plays as Ruth.

In 2013, she was the featured presenter for Dr. Forever!, a five-part documentary series featured in the Classic Doctor Who DVD range.

== Filmography ==
Year	Title	Role	Notes
1995–1998	Grange Hill	Poppy Silver	33 episodes
1996	Gadgetman	Frankie Scouler	TV film
1996, 2005	The Bill	Trixie Burroughs/Jasmine Bedford	2 episodes
2004, 2008–2009	Holby City	Mel Allen/Rachel Babtiste	22 episodes
2008	Placebo	Nurse Kelly Grogan	Pilot
2008	Doctor Who	Dee Dee Blasco	Episode: "Midnight"
2008	Parents of the Band	Camilla	2 episodes
2009	Mouth to Mouth	Devine Bello	6 episodes
2010	Skins	Police Officer	1 episode
2011	Mongrels	Co-worker	1 episode
2015	Pompidou	Nurse	1 episode
2015, 2020	Doctors	Kayley Rose/Janet Poulson	2 episodes
2017	Chewing Gum	Judith	1 episode
2020	Cursed	Polly the Healer	2 episodes
2020	Daleks!	Mechanoid 2150	Voices
2020	Daleks!	Chief Archivist	Voices
2021–present	Fireman Sam	Helen Flood, Mandy Flood, Jodie Phillips	Series regular
2022	The House	Police Officer #2	
2024	Father Brown	Rachel Waterson	1 episode

== Theatre ==
- The Firework Maker’s Daughter, Theatre Royal, Newcastle, February 2005 (playing Lila)
- Big White Fog, Almeida Theatre, May 2007 to June 2007 (playing Caroline Mason)
- Familyman, Theatre Royal Stratford East, May 2008 (playing Keisha)
- MADBLUD, Theatre Royal Stratford East, February 2009
- My Wonderful Day, Stephen Joseph Theatre, Scarborough, October 2009 (playing Winnie)
- Cinderella, Theatre Royal Stratford East, December 2011 to January 2012
- Red Velvet, Garrick theatre London, 23 January 2016 to 27 February 2016
- Dirty Great Love Story, Arts theatre London, 18 January 2017 to 18 March 2017
- White Teeth, Kiln theatre London, 7 August 2018
