= Ross Hastings =

Scottish-Canadian theologian and scientist

William Ross Hastings is a Canadian-based Zimbabwean-Scottish systematic theologian. He is the Sangwoo Youtong Chee Professor of Theology, at Regent College, Vancouver.

== Career ==
Hastings began his career as a high school chemistry teacher at St. Martin's School in Rosettenville, Johannesburg, where he coached rugby, cricket, and tennis. Later he taught, and was the school headmaster, at Grainger Grammar School in Newcastle upon Tyne in England. After obtaining his Ph.D. in chemistry, he taught at Trinity Western University while fulfilling a pastorate at Westminster Chapel in Burnaby, BC. He then pastored at Westview Bible Church in Montreal, and Peace Portal Alliance Church in Surrey, BC. After completing his PhD in theology at the University of St Andrews in 2004, he started teaching theology at Regent College in 2006 and became the Sangwoo Youtong Chee Professor of Theology at Regent College, Vancouver in 2016. He become full professor in 2018.

== Publications ==
- The Glory of the Ascension: Celebrating a Doctrine for the Life of the Church ISBN 978-1-5140-1061-7, 1-5140-1061-5)
- The Resurrection of Jesus Christ: Exploring Its Theological Significance and Ongoing Relevance (OCLC 1260241456; ISBN 978-1-5409-6529-5, 978-1-5409-6492-2).
- Pastoral Ethics: Moral Formation as Life in the Trinity (OCLC 1336019967; ISBN 979-8-3852-2961-1).
- Theological Ethics: The Moral Life of the Gospel in Contemporary Context (ISBN 978-0-310-11195-5 OCLC 1235900909).
- Total Atonement: Trinitarian Participation in the Reconciliation of Humanity and Creation (ISBN 978-1-9787-0213-4 OCLC 1108551763).
- Echoes of Coinherence: Trinitarian Theology and Science Together (ISBN 978-1-4982-4080-2, 978-1-5326-1684-6 OCLC 983694477).
- Where Do Broken Hearts Go? An Integrative, Participational Theology of Grief (ISBN 978-1-4982-7849-2, 978-1-4982-7847-8 OCLC 951645732).
- Jonathan Edwards and the Life of God: Toward an Evangelical Theology of Participation (ISBN 978-1-4514-8769-5 OCLC 889524335).
- Missional God, Missional Church: Hope for Re-evangelizing the West (ISBN 978-0-8308-3955-1 OCLC 794032484).
