= Xing Xing Digital Corporation =

Chinese animation studio

- Industry: Animation; Motion pictures
- Founded: 2004; 22 years ago
- Defunct: 2018; 8 years ago
- Headquarters: Beijing, China
- Products: Animated films
- Number of employees: TBA

Xing Xing Digital (Chinese: 幸星动画) was a Chinese animation studio based in Beijing, which specialized in producing large scale 3D animation, 2D animation, visual effects, stereoscopic movies and games. It was founded in 2004, and was one of the companies that animated the British children's series Fireman Sam.

In June 2012, Xing Xing Digital announced its intent to purchase Rainmaker Entertainment, with the company willing to pay off Rainmaker's $7 million debt. The purchase was called off after Rainmaker and Xing Xing were unable to finalize the sale by September 14, 2012.

In 2014, director John A. Davis announced that Xing Xing Digital and Pelagius Entertainment had been selected to co-produce his upcoming animated film Smart.

== Controversy ==
On July 26, 2016, the Fireman Sam episode Troubled Waters became the subject of controversy after a scene depicted the character Elvis tripping over a piece of paper containing Quranic text from Surah Mulk, verses 13–26. Following the controversy, HiT Entertainment and Mattel reportedly ended their involvement with the production, with WildBrain (formerly DHX Media Inc.) subsequently taking over animation duties.
