= Fireman Sam =

Welsh animated children's television series

- Created by: Dave Gingell; Dave Jones; Rob Lee
- Written by: Laura Beaumont; Paul Larson
- Voices of: John Alderton; John Sparkes; Joanna Ruiz; Sarah Hadland; Steven Kynman; David Carling; Su Douglas; Tegwen Tucker; Ifan Huw Dafydd; Nigel Whitmey; John Hasler; Alex Lowe; Jo Wyatt; Colin McFarlane; Ayesha Antoine
- Narrated by: John Alderton
- Music by: Ben Heneghan (1987–2005); Ian Lawson (1987–2005); David Pickvance (2008–2019); Blain Morris (2020–2021); Mike Shields (2021–2025); Amanda Cawley (2021–2025)
- Country of origin: United Kingdom
- Original languages: Welsh (Series 1-4); English
- No. of series: 16
- No. of episodes: 317 (list of episodes)

Production
- Running time: 10 minutes
- Production companies: Bumper Films (1987–1994); HIT Entertainment (2003–2017) (Note: Animation services by Siriol Productions (Series 5), HRTv (Series 6–7), and Xing Xing Digital Corporation (Series 6–10)); Mattel Television (2017–present); WildBrain (2017-2025) (Note: Animation services by DHX Studios Halifax/Island of Misfits (Series 11–12) (Note: Known as DHX Studios Halifax during Season 11. Credited as an outsourcer in Series 12.) and WildBrain Studios (Series 12–present))

Original release
- Network: S4C (Welsh version); Children's BBC on BBC1
- Release: 17 November 1987 – 17 November 1994
- Network: CBeebies
- Release: 4 April – 25 December 2005
- Network: Cartoonito
- Release: 24 November 2008 – 30 May 2025

Fireman Sam (Welsh: Sam Tân) is an animated children's television series about a fireman named Sam Jones, his fellow firefighters, and other residents of the fictional Welsh village of Pontypandy (a portmanteau of two real towns, Pontypridd and Tonypandy). It was broadcast for the first time in November 1987 on Welsh TV channel S4C and is shown in more than 155 countries across the world. Originally animated using stop motion (series 1–5), the series has been computer animated since 2008 (series 6–16).

== History ==
Fireman Sam first appeared in Welsh on S4C on 1 November 1987, and a few weeks later on BBC1 on 17 November 1987. The original series finished in 1994, and a new series that expanded the character cast commenced in 2003. The series was also shown as Sam Smalaidh in Scottish Gaelic in Scotland. The series was sold to over 40 countries and has been used across the United Kingdom to promote fire safety.

The theme song was performed by Maldwyn Pope in a classic rock style from 1987 to 1994, and then by a different singer, Cameron Stewart, in the 2000s alternative rock style since the 2003 new episode broadcasts.

== Development ==
The original idea came from two ex-firemen from London, Dave Gingell and David Jones, who had bought a book on stop motion by artist Anthony Miller. They approached Mike Young, creator of SuperTed, in Barry, Wales, and asked him to further develop their concept. The idea was then brought to S4C's Director of Animation, Chris Grace, who had previously commissioned SuperTed. Grace saw potential in the idea and commissioned the series.

The characters and the storylines were created by Rob Lee, an illustrator from Cardiff who also designed the SuperTed characters, and the programme was made using stop motion animation. It could take up to four days to produce one minute of this form of puppet animation. Fireman Sam has, to this day, been broadcast in several countries around the world and has been translated into over 25 different languages, including Mandarin.

In the original series, all the character voices were performed by John Alderton. The later series used several actors' voices.

In 2021, Mike Young said that shows like Fireman Sam and SuperTed would not be able to exist without government subsidies to S4C.

== Episodes ==
Series	Episodes	Originally released	
Series	Episodes	First released	Last released
1	8	17 November 1987	10 December 1987
2	8	1 September 1988	22 December 1988
3	9	15 October 1990	10 December 1990
4	8	21 October 1994	17 November 1994
5	26	4 April 2005	25 December 2005
6	26	24 November 2008	27 February 2009
7	26	4 May 2009	19 July 2009
8	26	3 March 2012	10 November 2012
9	25	7 April 2014	3 September 2014
10	25	15 February 2016	26 August 2016
11	13	18 November 2017	9 May 2018
12	13	26 October 2020	17 February 2021
13	26	4 October 2021	7 October 2022
14	26	1 November 2022	7 July 2023
15	26	21 October 2023	28 May 2024
16	26	1 October 2024	30 May 2025

== Spin-offs ==
In 1996, there was a stage show that was later released on video, titled Fireman Sam in Action. It was interspersed with scenes of children learning about fire safety with Gary Lewis, the actor playing Fireman Sam in the stage show.

In 2009, Fireman Sam appeared with other animated children's TV characters in the Children in Need single The Official BBC Children in Need Medley. The single was put together by Peter Kay.

Fireman Sam was adapted into a live musical theatre show, which began touring the UK in June 2011.

In 2014, Amazon Prime redubbed Fireman Sam using American voices instead of British voices for children in the United States. However, the characters of Tom Thomas, Moose Roberts and Bella Lasagne have their regular, respective Australian, Canadian and Italian voices (instead of being dubbed with a US voice actor), due to their characters' accents. This cast includes the voices of Andrew Hodwitz, Jonah Ain, Chris D'Silva, Margaret Brock, Lily Cassano, Dave Pender Crichton, Jacob James, Scott Lancastle, Ashley Magwood, Michael Pongracz, Becky Shrimpton, Sarah Lynn Strange, Carter Treneer (later replaced by Mark Ricci), Joe Marth (later replaced by Dave MacRae), Adam Turgeon and Christa Clahane.

== Reception ==
The ABC website said of the series, "All the characters blend together into an appealing mixture of fun and entertainment for children everywhere".

Common Sense Media recommended the 2005 series for ages three and up, praising it for showing how to "stay calm in a crisis" and rely on a team to solve problems. The American website found that the "distinctly Welsh characters, community, accents, and expressions may pose some minor comprehension problems for kids on this side of the pond", but considered it a useful example of life in another part of the world.

== Controversy ==
A page from the Quran appearing in Fireman Sam

In July 2016, it was reported that a page briefly visible in Series 9, Episode 6, "Troubled Waters" – during a scene in which Elvis slips on a sheet of paper – appeared to contain text from the Quran, identified by a representative of a Muslim organization as verses 13–26 of Surah Mulk (67). Mattel apologised, withdrew the episode from broadcast, and ended its relationship with Xing Xing, the animation company responsible for the error. Mattel stated that someone from the animation company "thought they were just putting in random text. We have no reason to believe it was done maliciously."

Though expected to be withdrawn permanently, the episode was instead edited to make the paper blank, so the television networks were still able to broadcast it. The BBC received more than 1,000 complaints and referred them to Channel 5, as it had not aired Fireman Sam since 2008. Ofcom decided not to investigate the episode stating that even at the highest resolution it was impossible to tell if the text was from the Quran or not.
