= The Lysistrata Project (radio drama) =

The Lysistrata Project is a contemporary re-working or adaptation for radio of Aristophanes's play Lysistrata, developed with the help of young people living and studying in London, UK. First broadcast 28 May 2006 on BBC Radio 3 with the following cast, directed by Marc Beeby:

- Lacy ...... Ayesha Antoine
- Lucas ...... Javone Prince
- Mike ...... Mohammed George
- Kelly ...... Gbemisola Ikumelo
- Colin ...... Carl Prekopp
- Maria/Tanya ...... Claire Louise Cordwell
- Jake/Dave ...... Mark Monero
