= Fireman Sam in Action =

- Directed by: Vivienne Cozens; Charles Savage (stage)
- Written by: Charles Savage
- Produced by: Sue Kerr (executive producer)
- Starring: Gary Lucas; Ian Sinclair; Mark Frederick; Victoria Edwards; Joe Vera; Sarah Dyall; Sarah Carleton; Karen Briffett; Kelly East; Emma Watt
- Edited by: Brian Berry
- Music by: Ben Heneghan; Ian Lawson; Nick Sexton (producer, additional music and lyrics)
- Distributed by: BBC Video
- Release date: 1 April 1996
- Running time: 62 minutes
- Language: English

Fireman Sam in Action is a 1996 live-action stage play/film based on the animated British children's television series Fireman Sam. The play features three stories, Fire Station Flood Alert, Dilys' Attic Fire and Pontypandy Fireworks Party, and was filmed and released straight to video. The film was released on 1 April 1996 on BBC Video. The opening sequence of this film was filmed on location at Aldenham Country Park, Borehamwood, Hertfordshire, England. It features children learning fire safety with Sam played by Gary Lucas. The show, created by Paragraph International (based at Pinewood Studios) toured worldwide with Writer and Director, Charles Savage for 7 years along with a Postman Pat Musical.

== Plot ==
The video is made up of three separate stories. They are essentially live action adaptations of stories from the animated series, with a few significant changes. Penny Morris appears in all three stories, though she had then only appeared in one episode in the show. Also, each story includes a subplot which was not in the series – Elvis being sacked as Fire Station cook, the training film, and Norman's pet hedgehog were all created for the stage play. Bella Lasagne is not introduced until the second story, because Bentley the Robot is played by the same actress.

=== Fire Station Flood Alert ===
Station Officer Steele fires Elvis Cridlington as the station cook. This gives Fireman Sam an idea; He invents Pancake Prototype One and a robot called Bentley to be Elvis' replacement ("Gently, Bentley"). Whilst spring-cleaning, Elvis, exasperated with Bentley's constant whistling, decides to place his Elvis Presley cassette into the robot. This causes Bentley to malfunction and ends up breaking the stopcock, causing a flood inside the fire station. When it's all sorted, the crew start having what Bentley has cooked, bangers and mash. It turns out that Bentley is not a good replacement, and everyone decides Elvis should be reappointed ("Elvis Cooks The Lunch").

=== Dilys' Attic Fire ===
A few weeks later, the fire station crew set to work on a training film with Norman Price as Trevor's "gofer". Production of the training film begins. Norman gets bored of being a gofer, so Penny suggests he play a victim in their staged rescue, along with Sam's niece and nephew Sarah and James. Later, Dilys Price looks for treasure in her attic after reading a magazine article, but the candle she uses as a light source starts a fire in the house. When she's getting rescued, she argues about not letting go of a valuable vase that she found and could be in danger of breaking, and it ends up in Trevor's hands. Dilys lavishly praises the fire brigade, but they say it's all in a day's work ("By Jupiter, By Jupiter").

=== Pontypandy Fireworks Party ===
On 5 November, the crew are preparing a bonfire for Bonfire Night, under the command of Station Officer Steele ("The Person in Charge Is Station Officer Steele"). Norman is dressed as a tree and pinches Bella and Dilys' bottoms ("Naughty Norman Price"). His plan is foiled by some railings, in which he ends up getting stuck. After the crew rescue him from the railings, Norman introduces his pet hedgehog, which he calls Brian. Brian scampers into the bonfire and Norman panics to get him out. The crew set up the guy and light the bonfire, but Norman, who is searching for Brian, is in danger of being killed. After he's rescued, it's revealed that Brian was a female hedgehog and had just had babies. Sam renames the hedgehog Bronwyn, but advises Norman to let the hedgehogs off into their natural habitat. Trevor and Elvis light the bonfire, and the celebrations are underway ("Remember, Remember The Fifth of November").

== Cast ==
- Gary Lucas as Fireman Sam
- Mark Frederick as Elvis Cridlington
- Ian Sinclair as Station Officer Steele
- Victoria Edwards as Penny Morris
- Joe Vera as Trevor Evans
- Karen Briffett as Norman Price
- Sarah Carleton as Dilys Price
- Sarah Dyall as Bella Lasagne and Bentley the Robot
- Emma Watt as Sarah
- Kelly East as James

== Soundtrack ==
- Fireman Sam Theme
- Gently Bentley
- Elvis Cooks the Lunch (the only solo in the show, performed by Elvis Cridlington)
- By Jupiter, By Jupiter
- The Person in Charge Is Officer Steele
- Naughty Norman Price
- Remember, Remember, the Fifth of November, composed by Nick Sexton, lyrics by Vicky Edwards and Sarah Carleton

The soundtrack was released as Fireman Sam "Ready For Action" on an audio cassette by Sony Wonder Records.
