= Raising Children Network =

Australian parenting website

Raising Children Network operates the Australian website raisingchildren.net.au launched in 2006. It is funded by the Australian Government as a means to produce and maintain educational tools and resources for families raising children in Australia.

== History ==
The raisingchildren.net.au (originally "Raising Children") website, which was launched in May 2006, is a resource for parenting information in Australia. It is a comprehensive website covering information required for raising children provided to new and expecting parents.

As a companion to the Raising Children website and to extend its reach, the Raising Children DVD was produced in 2007. In November 2007, Australia became the first country in the world to initiate a universal parenting education program when it started distributing the companion Raising Children DVD to every family in the country, at the birth of their child in the hospital. Over 250,000 are distributed each year.

The Raising Children DVD contains five hours of content — divided into three short movies: New-born, Baby, and Child as well as a section called ‘What About Me?’ which focuses on parental feelings.

Its effectiveness, according to the Australian Council for Educational Research (ACER) independent evaluation, is due to a combination of factors including: the quality of production, the primary use of documentary style parent interviews, a comedic host and the inclusion of visual demonstrations of key skills, like breastfeeding and safe bathing.

In 2007, the Raising Children website and DVD swept the relevant interactive media awards in Australia. The Raising Children DVD won the Australian Interactive Media Industry Association (AIMIA) award for the Best Learning & Education category. The judges commented that the DVD is,

“in essence an interactive documentary for parents & carers, allowing them to explore and engage with information about parenting that enables the active construction of knowledge.”

The Raising Children website received the AIMIA award in the Best Non-profit & Government category, earning praise from judges for the site's innovative features:

“The pop-up glossary terms are a fantastic solution to get information quickly and effectively to the user without sending them to a whole different page, and Make a Book is an invaluable function for tired parents to be able to refer back to without logging on.”

In 2009, the Australian Government announced funding for the Raising Children website to extend the parenting content to include parenting adolescents and teenagers up to 16 years of age, which became available in 2010.

In 2017, the website claimed a total of over 14 million visitors.

== Network structure ==
Three non-profit organizations formed the consortium behind the Raising Children Network:

- The Parenting Research Centre, which was responsible for content development & quality assurance,
- Smart Population Foundation, which was responsible for design, web development, content optimization & communications, and
- The Murdoch Children’s Research Institute’s Centre for Community Child Health at the Royal Children's Hospital, Melbourne (RCH), which was responsible for project and stakeholder management and evaluation.

The Smart Population Foundation later left the consortium, and the RCH and Murdoch Children's Research Institute became members individually.
