= A Christmas Carol (soundtrack) =

A Christmas Carol (Original Motion Picture Soundtrack)

Soundtrack album by Alan Silvestri
- Released: November 3, 2009
- Recorded: 2008–2009
- Studios: Newman Scoring Stage, 20th Century Fox Studios, Los Angeles; Abbey Road Studios, London
- Genres: Film score; Christmas music
- Length: 45:27
- Label: Walt Disney Records
- Producer: Alan Silvestri

Alan Silvestri chronology
G.I. Joe: The Rise of Cobra (2009)	A Christmas Carol (2010)	The A-Team (2010)

A Christmas Carol (Original Motion Picture Soundtrack) is the film score composed by Alan Silvestri to the 2009 Christmas fantasy film A Christmas Carol directed by Robert Zemeckis, based on the 1843 novel of the same name by Charles Dickens. The film featured an ensemble motion-captured and voice cast that includes Jim Carrey, Gary Oldman, Colin Firth, Bob Hoskins, Robin Wright Penn, Cary Elwes and Fionnula Flanagan. The film score is composed by regular Zemeckis collaborator Alan Silvestri, and performed by the Hollywood Studio Symphony, and released through Walt Disney Records on November 3, 2009.

== Development ==
The film score is composed by regular Zemeckis collaborator Alan Silvestri, who noted that the director enjoyed working on motion capture animation very much and in this film, he noticed on the familiarity and nostalgia of the original Christmas carols and had specific ideas in mind. He wrote several specific themes based on traditional Christmas carols such as "God Rest You Merry, Gentlemen", "Deck the Halls", "O Come, All Ye Faithful", "Hark! The Herald Angels Sing" and "Joy to the World".

The score was written much earlier as they had to begin production for motion capture. He initially started writing themes for the film prior to the Christmas of 2008, but by the end of January 2009, he had to halt it midway so that he could work on Night at the Museum: Battle of the Smithsonian and G.I. Joe: The Rise of Cobra. After finishing the latter by May 2009, he resumed writing the themes for the film.

Before completing the film's score, Zemeckis wanted a "classic Christmas song" which was "supremely spiritual but not religious" and needed to be titled "God bless us, everyone" based on the famous phrase spoken by the fictional character Tiny Tim. He need a song that "would live on, after the film, as part of the lexicon of Christmas music".

Silvestri then associated with his longtime songwriter Glen Ballard, for a tune that seemed appropriate, but Zemeckis did not find it appropriate. Hence, they tried in the style of traditional carols such as "O Come, All Ye Faithful" and "Hark! The Herald Angels Sing". Italian opera singer Andrea Bocelli, heard the song demo and agreed to perform that number, in a two-day schedule. He recorded the song in English, Italian and Spanish versions. This song was included in his studio album My Christmas (2009).

Silvestri conducted the Hollywood Studio Symphony, while also orchestrating it with William Ross, Conrad Pope and John Ashton Thomas. The score was recorded at the Newman Scoring Stage in Los Angeles, California. The orchestra and choir were recorded at the last two days of scoring sessions; though the orchestra being recorded in Los Angeles, the choir was recorded at the Abbey Road Studios in London, the next day. "Present" by JUJU is the theme song for the Japanese version.

== Release ==
The score to A Christmas Carol was released through Walt Disney Records on November 3, 2009. It was only released as a digital download through MP3 and other loseless audio formats. A physical release of the album was published by Intrada Records which released through CDs in 2013.

== Reception ==
Thomas Glorieux of Maintitles wrote "what Alan Silvestri did wrong for Night at the Museum 2 and GI. Joe, he has surely corrected with A Christmas Carol. It has a cheerful main theme, inspiring underscore and a couple of standout moments that make me even forget I was ever mad at the composer in question. But we must be mad, because Alan Silvestri remains of the true last musketeers of filmmusic, and we must expect the best of him each time. Unfair I know, but at least Scrooge unraveled once again the good old Silvestri to put under that Christmas tree. Not as dazzling as The Polar Express, but darn humbug close nonetheless." Jonathan Broxton of Movie Music UK wrote "Having said that, and being fully aware of all its influences and inspirations, A Christmas Carol remains a thoroughly entertaining album, with several sparkling moments of Yuletide magic. Personally, I feel this is Silvestri’s most satisfying score since The Polar Express and Van Helsing five years ago."

Christian Clemmensen of Filmtracks wrote "Ultimately, had Silvestri relied a bit less on the traditional melodies, the score could have easily earned four stars; his choice to lean so heavily on them ensured functionality but is somewhat tiring after forty minutes." Sean Wilson of MFiles wrote "A Christmas Carol is one of Alan Silvestri's most purely satisfying scores, a multi-faceted listening experience that is able to tell Charles Dickens' story on its terms brilliantly. It samples all that is great about the composer – witty instrumental ensembles, heartfelt writing for choir, superb action music – into a brilliant package that is sure to go down as one of the classic Yuletide film scores. It's a graceful, intelligent, beautiful and occasionally scary work that marks a high point between the composer and director Robert Zemeckis. Long may it continue – and God bless us, everyone!"

Critic Roger Ebert stated that, "The score by Alan Silvestri sneaks in some traditional Christmas carols, but you have to listen for such as “God Rest Ye Merry, Gentlemen” when its distinctive cadences turn sinister during a perilous flight through London." Kirk Honeycutt of The Hollywood Reporter called it a "robust score". John Hazelton of Screen International wrote "Carol also benefits from strong work by Zemeckis regulars, production designer Doug Chiang and composer Alan Silvestri. Giving the film another potential commercial hook, Andrea Bocelli belts out the closing credits song God Bless Us Everyone, composed by Silvestri and Glen Ballard." Harrison Pierce of Collider wrote "lovely score". Amy Lamare of MovieWeb called it one of the best film scores of 2000s, adding "Silvestri produces music that helps create a magical feeling for fans while watching A Christmas Carol around the Holidays."

== Track listing ==
All music is composed by Alan Silvestri.

No.	Title	Length
1.	"A Christmas Carol Main Title"	4:21
2.	"Scrooge Counts Money"	0:48
3.	"Marley's Ghost Visits Scrooge"	6:12
4.	"The Ghost of Christmas Past"	4:58
5.	"Let Us See Another Christmas"	1:18
6.	"Flight To Fezziwigs"	1:27
7.	"First Waltz"	0:59
8.	"Another Idol Has Replaced Me"	1:40
9.	"Touch My Robe"	3:41
10.	"The Clock Tower"	1:50
11.	"Carriage Chase"	3:24
12.	"Old Joe and Mrs. Dilber"	2:28
13.	"This Dark Chamber"	1:56
14.	"None Of Us Will Ever Forget"	1:33
15.	"Who Was That Lying Dead?"	3:08
16.	"I'm Still Here"	1:26
17.	"Ride On My Good Man"	1:04
18.	"God Bless Us Everyone" (performed by Andrea Bocelli)	3:15
Total length:		45:27

== Personnel ==
Credits adapted from liner notes:

- Music composer – Alan Silvestri
- Music producer – Alan Silvestri, David Bifano
- Engineer – Denis St. Amand
- Recording – Dennis Sands, Adam Olmstead, Peter Cobbin
- Recordist – Tim Lauber
- Mixing – Dennis Sands
- Mastering – Pat Sullivan
- Music editor – Kenneth Karman
- Assistant music editor– Jeannie Marks
- Score production assistance – James Findlay
- Studio manager – Abbe Sands
- Copyist – JoAnn Kane Music Services, Mark Graham
- Design – Steve Sterling
- Music business and legal affairs – Scott Holtzman, Sylvia Krask
- Executive in charge of music – Mitchell Leib

Orchestra

- Conductor – Alan Silvestri
- Orchestrators – Conrad Pope, John Ashton Thomas, William Ross
- Contractor – Peter Rotter, Sandy DeCrescent
- Stage manager – Dominic Gonzales, Tom Steel, Stacey Robinson

Instruments

- Bass – Bruce Morgenthaler, Christian Kollgaard, David Parmeter, Drew Dembowski, Edward Meares, Michael Valerio, Nico Abondolo, Nicolas Philippon, Oscar Hidalgo, Susan Ranney, Timothy Eckert
- Bassoon – Allen Savedoff, Kenneth Munday, Michael O'Donovan, Rose Corrigan
- Cello – Andrew Shulman, Armen Ksajikian, Cecelia Tsan, Christina Soule, Dane Little, David Speltz, Dennis Karmazyn, Erika Duke-Kirkpatrick, George Kim Scholes, John Walz, Paul Cohen, Paula Hochhalter, Steve Erdody, Timothy Landauer, Trevor Handy
- Clarinet – Benjamin Lulich, Donald Foster, Gary Bovyer, Lawrence Hughes, Ralph Williams, Stuart Clark
- Flute – David Shostac, Geraldine Rotella, Heather Clark, James Walker
- Harp – Katie Kirkpatrick, Marcia Dickstein
- Horn – Brian O'Connor, Daniel Kelley, David Duke, James Thatcher, Jenny Kim, Katharine Dennis, Mark Adams, Paul Klintworth, Richard Todd, Steven Becknell
- Keyboards – Alan Steinberger, Randy Kerber, Randy Waldman
- Oboe – Barbara Northcutt, David Weiss, Jonathan Davis, Leslie Reed
- Percussion – Alan Estes, Daniel Greco, Donald Williams, Gregory Goodall, Judith Chilnick, Peter Limonick, Steven Schaeffer
- Trombone – Alexander Iles, Andrew Malloy, William Reichenbach, Charles Loper, Steven Holtman
- Trumpet – David Washburn, Jon Lewis, Malcolm McNab, Rick Baptist, Timothy Morrison, Warren Luening
- Tuba – Doug Tornquist, Gary Hickman
- Viola – Andrew Duckles, Brian Dembow, Darrin McCann, David Walther, Jennie Hansen, Keith Greene, Luke Maurer, Marlow Fisher, Matthew Funes, Michael Nowak, Pete Jandula-Hudson, Roland Kato, Samuel Formicola, Shawn Mann, Steven Gordon, Thomas Diener, Victoria Miskolczy
- Violin – Aimee Kreston, Alyssa Park, Amy Hershberger, Ana Landauer, Anatoly Rosinsky, Armen Anassian, Belinda Broughton, Bruce Dukov, Darius Campo, Eun-Mee Ahn, Franklyn D'Antonio, Helen Nightengale, Henry Gronnier, Ishani Bhoola, Jacqueline Brand, Jeanne Skrocki, Josefina Vergara, Julie Ann Gigante, Julie Rogers, Katia Popov, Kenneth Yerke, Kevin Connolly, Lisa Sutton, Lorand Lokuszta, Lorenz Gamma, Maia Jasper, Natalie Leggett, Nina Evtuhov, Phillip Levy, Radu Pieptea, Rafael Rishik, Richard Altenbach, Robert Brophy, Roberto Cani, Roger Wilkie, Searmi Park, Serena McKinney, Shalini Vijayan, Sid Page, Songa Lee, Tamara Hatwan

== Accolades ==
Award	Category	Recipient(s) and nominee(s)	Result	Ref.
ASCAP Film and Television Music Awards	Top Box Office Films	Alan Silvestri (Note: also for Night at the Museum: Battle of the Smithsonian and G.I. Joe: The Rise of Cobra)	Won	
BMI Film & TV Awards	Film Music Award	Alan Silvestri	Won	
International Film Music Critics Association	Best Original Score for an Animated Film	Alan Silvestri	Nominated	
