= Peter Kay's Car Share =

British TV sitcom (2015–2018)

- Genre: Sitcom; Slice of life
- Created by: Paul Coleman; Tim Reid
- Showrunner: Peter Kay
- Written by: Paul Coleman; Sian Gibson; Peter Kay; Tim Reid
- Directed by: Peter Kay
- Starring: Peter Kay; Sian Gibson
- Country of origin: United Kingdom
- Original language: English
- No. of series: 3
- No. of episodes: 12 (2 specials)

Production
- Producer: Gill Isles
- Running time: 30 minutes
- Production company: Goodnight Vienna

Original release
- Network: BBC One
- Release: 29 April 2015 – 28 May 2018

Peter Kay's Car Share is a British sitcom set around supermarket assistant manager John Redmond (Peter Kay) and promotions rep Kayleigh Kitson (Sian Gibson), and their participation in a company car-sharing scheme.

The first series was filmed in and around Greater Manchester: notably Peter Kay's native Bolton; and Manchester, Trafford and Salford.

In December 2015, Kay confirmed a second and supposedly final series had been commissioned. It began airing on 11 April 2017. Filming locations for the second series included: Blair Drummond Safari Park, Bury, Burnley, Nelson, Wirral and Southport. Peter Kay's Car Share won Best Comedy at the 2016, 2018 and 2019 National Television Awards, and the BAFTA TV Awards for Best Male Comedy Performance and Best Scripted Comedy at the 2016 BAFTA TV Awards.

The series came to an end in May 2018 when two special episodes broadcast on 7 and 28 May. The first of these, "Peter Kay's Car Share Unscripted", was partially improvised but incorporated prepared radio material and visual gags.

The programme returned for an audio special in April 2020, amid the COVID-19 pandemic.

== Plot ==
The series focuses on supermarket assistant manager John Redmond (Kay) and promotions rep Kayleigh Kitson (Gibson), who are participating in their work's car-sharing scheme.

The first half of each episode shows John picking up Kayleigh from her house in his red Fiat 500L and the pair having discussions about each other's lives as they travel to work. The second half of the episode follows the pair on the car journey home and they reveal what they did at work.

As they travel to and from work, John and Kayleigh listen to Forever FM, a fictitious radio station that has music alternating with terrible advertisements and promotions. In each episode, one or both of them (more so Kayleigh) daydream about them creating a music video-style fantasy performance of a song played on the radio.

Surprising billboards at the roadside and on vehicles provide an additional source of interest ("Brazilian wax while you wait", "One meal for the price of two", "No pies left in this van overnight", "Shaun Ryder Rehab Centre", "HALALDI" and others), as well as the radio adverts and announcements.

One episode features the ice cream van owned and driven by "Mr Softee Top", an ice cream man and porn video salesman who was the subject of the That Peter Kay Thing episode "The Ice Cream Man Cometh".

== Cast ==
- Peter Kay as John Redmond, assistant manager of the supermarket where he and Kayleigh work
- Sian Gibson as Kayleigh Kitson, John's colleague and a promotions rep in the supermarket
- Danny Swarsbrick as Ted 2, the new trolley collector after Old Ted dies (8 episodes)
- Guy Garvey as Steve, Kayleigh's brother-in-law and a motorbike fanatic (4 episodes)
- Gemma Facinelli as Rachel, colleague of John and Kayleigh's, who takes a small shine to John (2 episodes)
- Reece Shearsmith as 'Stink' Ray, store fishmonger whom John and Kayleigh hate because of his foul mouth and fishy body odour
- Conleth Hill as Elsie, colleague of John and Kayleigh's, who has a drunken lift home after an end of year party
- Simon Greenall as Dave Thompson, John's boss, heard through conversation and a phone call
- Mick Miller as Tony, lewd friend of the Redmond family whom John chats to in a greasy spoon
- Pearce Quigley as a cyclist who John tangles with in a bout of road rage, ending up with him going viral on YouTube
- Vasant Mistry as Old Ted the supermarket trolley collector who dies between the first and second episodes
- Bryan Hand as Ken, Kayleigh's elderly neighbour who goes dogwalking with her occasionally
- David Galbraith as Ian Lichfield, John's old friend and manager of the Wigan store
- Archie Kelly as "Man with dog", encountered when Kayleigh asks if dogging is as innocent as she thinks
- Loraine Calvert as Rose Redmond, John's Nan who pops up through conversation and a bit of housesitting
- Rob Charles (Breakfast radio Presenter of Forever FM) (12 episodes)
- Martin Emery (Drivetime radio Presenter of Forever FM) (12 episodes)

== Production ==
The series was commissioned in 2013 by the BBC, and was initially made available on BBC iPlayer. Inspiration for the show, for co-creators Tim Reid and Paul Coleman, included Alfred Molina and Dawn French in the BBC's Roger & Val Have Just Got In and The Smoking Room. Paul Coleman pitched the idea to Peter Kay, whom he had previously worked with on Max and Paddy's Road to Nowhere. The programme was mainly filmed in and around Manchester, Farnworth (Bolton), Westhoughton, Horwich, Swinton, Bury, Walkden, Altrincham (Trafford) and Little Hulton (Salford).

John and Kayleigh's place of work was portrayed as being the Manchester Fort retail park in the city's Cheetham Hill area, but was in reality filmed around the goods entrance and car park at the back of the large Halfords Autocentre off Viaduct Way in the Broadheath area of Altrincham. The exterior was dressed with fake windows containing large images of fresh fruit and vegetables, with car park features, trolleys, staff uniforms and signage in the style and colours of Sainsbury's, at which, coincidentally, Peter Kay once worked in real life. In episode 3 of series 1, two members of Halfords staff in their gold and black uniforms can be seen in the unloading bay as John and Kayleigh drop off their colleague "Stink" Ray (Reece Shearsmith) the fishmonger.

The Forever FM presenters are voiced by Rob Charles (Mike on the "Mike and his Morning Muesli" breakfast show), and Martin Emery (Andy on the "Big Drive Home" drivetime show). The fictional radio station was created by Salford-based audio creative company Kalua, and its tagline is "Forever FM: playing timeless hits, now and forever".

In May 2016, filming began on the second and final series. On 3 December, Peter Kay announced that the second series would be broadcast on BBC in April 2017. An exclusive scene was aired during Peter Kay's Christmas Comedy Shuffle on BBC One on Christmas Eve 2016. The first two episodes of the second series were given an advance screening at Vue Cinemas for Red Nose Day 2017. The full series was made available on BBC iPlayer from 11 April 2017.

On 2 May 2017, Kay announced that there would not be a third series or a Christmas special; however, on 17 November 2017, it was announced that a final episode would be broadcast in 2018, in addition to a one-off unscripted episode.

== Reception ==
An exclusive screening of all six episodes of the first series was held in Blackpool on 28 March 2015, in aid of Chorley children's hospice Derian House. The entire first series was briefly available on BBC iPlayer where it became the most watched series to be released as a box set. Critic Grace Dent wrote: "I laughed over and over again, loudly and gracelessly, during BBC1's Car Share".

== Transphobia allegations ==
The improvised episode from the series received some criticism owing to its negative portrayal of transgender individuals, making light of attacks against trans individuals. During the episode, a fictional pre-prepared radio segment similar to Simon Bates' Our Tune is played, which outlines a breakdown of a woman's marriage due to her then-husband Gordon's gender dysphoria when she discovers her husband wearing her clothes.

The woman outlines that she moves on from the marriage, but subsequently her ex-husband was attacked by a "gang of lads" while on a night out and was unable to escape owing to wearing high heels. She visits them in hospital, where they were in a coma and using a ventilator, and reconcile on their recovery. In response to their being on breathing tubes, Kayleigh (played by Sian Gibson) states, "It’s what happens… I’d have pulled the [life support] tubes out," while Kay's character shows a V sign.

The story concludes with the fictional woman stating that the Gordon is scheduled for gender-affirming surgery and will transition to be known as Jordan in time for the woman's wedding, where they would appear as chief bridesmaid. At the end, the story is dedicated with the song "More Than a Woman" by the Bee Gees.

The episode drew criticism about its lazy stereotyping of transgender individuals and particularly about its making light of attacks on transgender people, which at the time of release, 2018, had increased for the 7th consecutive year in the United Kingdom.

== Episode list ==
Series	Episodes	Originally released		Average ratings (millions)
Series	Episodes	First released	Last released	Average ratings (millions)
1	6	29 April 2015	22 May 2015	6.03
Short Special		24 December 2016		4.56
2	4	11 April 2017	2 May 2017	7.94
3	2	7 May 2018	28 May 2018	7.98
Audio Special		10 April 2020		—N/a

=== Series 1 (2015) ===
No.	Title	Directed by	Written by	Original release date	UK viewers (millions)
1	"Episode 1"	Peter Kay	Paul Coleman, Sian Gibson, Peter Kay & Tim Reid	29 April 2015	7.01
John Redmond and Kayleigh Kitson, co-workers at a supermarket, are paired together in a new work car sharing scheme, commuting to and from work together. After John's struggle to navigate to Kayleigh's house owing to the satnav in the car, he arrives at Kayleigh's house. At Kayleigh's behest, they listen to music on Forever FM, a local radio station. Things get off to a bad start when Kayleigh accidentally spills a bottle of her urine all over John, resulting in him having to change his clothes. They get to know each other's background and their exes. At 36, Kayleigh says she is desperate to find a man and start a family, fearing her biological clock is ticking. John corrects a rumour spread by Diane off non-foods that he is gay. Kayleigh gets animated with the shop's Christmas plans. At the end of the episode, they agree they want to continue car sharing with each other. Forever FM playlist: Martika – "Martika's Kitchen", Spagna – "Call Me", Tina Charles – "I Love to Love", Texas – "When We Are Together", R.E.M. – "Losing My Religion", B*Witched – "C'est la Vie", Erasure – "A Little Respect", Anastacia – "I'm Outta Love", Sad Café – "Every Day Hurts"
2	"Episode 2"	Peter Kay	Paul Coleman, Sian Gibson, Peter Kay & Tim Reid	30 April 2015	4.67
John and Kayleigh are forced to take the morning off work owing to the death of a long-standing colleague, the trolley pusher Old Ted. Kayleigh quizzes John about his funeral, but he says, at 39, he's never thought about that. Kayleigh's friendship with her elderly next door neighbour Ken becomes a hot topic when Kayleigh misunderstands the definition of "dogging", assuming it means walking a dog. She insists the new trolley wrangler will never replace Old Ted, but when she sees him, he sparks some interest from her. Forever FM playlist: They Might Be Giants – "Birdhouse in Your Soul", R. Kelly – "Ignition", Johnny Hates Jazz – "Turn Back the Clock", Duran Duran – "Ordinary World", Stiltskin – "Inside", Blue – "All Rise", Vanessa Carlton – "A Thousand Miles", Cyndi Lauper – "True Colors", Alicia Bridges – I Love the Nightlife, Laura Branigan – "Gloria", Kylie Minogue – "I Believe in You"
3	"Episode 3"	Peter Kay	Paul Coleman, Sian Gibson, Peter Kay & Tim Reid	6 May 2015	6.44
John collects Kayleigh, who is still suffering side-effects from a late night partying. They are annoyed when they run into supermarket fishmonger Ray (Reece Shearsmith), whom they both nickname "Stink Ray". To make matters worse, Kayleigh has a lunchtime date with a Japanese man she has connected to on on-line dating site Heartsearchers. She has learnt the language especially, but it turns out Jap Si is not even Japanese. John's lovelife comes under scrutiny, and it is discovered he was engaged to Charlotte but broke it off, as he cannot commit. Forever FM playlist: The Mock Turtles – "Can You Dig It", Olivia Newton-John and the ELO – "Xanadu", Whitney Houston – "How Will I Know", Ini Kamoze – "Here Comes the Hotstepper", Color Me Badd – "I Wanna Sex You Up", Prefab Sprout – "The King of Rock 'n' Roll", Boy Meets Girl – "Waiting for a Star to Fall", The Smiths – "Please, Please, Please, Let Me Get What I Want"
4	"Episode 4"	Peter Kay	Paul Coleman, Sian Gibson, Peter Kay & Tim Reid	13 May 2015	6.18
While John is excited about his new hands-free phone kit, Kayleigh is more excited about the Beyoncé concert she attended the previous night. John gets road rage at a school crossing, which causes a builder to rub his egg sandwich into the windscreen when John makes him angry. This results in a visit to the car wash to clean the now dirty windscreen, and while they are there, Kayleigh's unusual fear of water is discovered when she suffers a panic attack. Thankfully, John's support and a daydream to "MMMBop" gets her through. (The dream sequence features a Bedknobs and Broomsticks style animation featuring Kayleigh swimming under water.) During the work shift, Kayleigh falls out with boss Dave Thompson over an incident on fruit and veg, leaving repercussions for the journey home. Forever FM playlist: Hue and Cry – "Labour of Love", Five – "Keep on Movin'", Hanson – "MMMBop", R. Kelly – "Bump n' Grind", OMC – "How Bizarre", Sydney Youngblood – "If Only I Could", Tears for Fears – "Everybody Wants to Rule the World", The B-52's – "Love Shack"
5	"Episode 5"	Peter Kay	Paul Coleman, Sian Gibson, Peter Kay & Tim Reid	20 May 2015	6.10
It's John's Nana Rose's birthday but he's forgotten to post her card. He tries to put things right on the way to work but falls while posting her card, and badly injures his arm. To make matters worse, Kayleigh has agreed to take her niece Chloe and nephew Alfie to school, meaning they will share the car that morning, too. When they finish work, Kayleigh must drive an injured John home, but colleague Rachel's interest in John and some bad news from her brother Kieran are on Kayleigh's mind. As John drifts off in a daydream, he imagines himself, in a leather jacket and Beatle cut, singing Cliff Richard's "Devil Woman" with Rachel from work as a lithe, cat-suited red devil-woman, dancing tauntingly around him. Both John and Kayleigh's day goes from bad to worse when the car breaks down after Kayleigh fills it with petrol instead of diesel. Forever FM playlist: Madonna – "Cherish", ABC – "When Smokey Sings", Kylie Minogue – "Put Yourself in My Place", INXS – "New Sensation", Stereophonics – "Have a Nice Day", Enrique Iglesias – "Hero", Boyzone – "Picture of You", Cliff Richard – "Devil Woman", The Cars – "Drive", Aretha Franklin & George Michael – "I Knew You Were Waiting (For Me)", Aztec Camera – "Somewhere in My Heart", Donna Summer – "This Time I Know It's for Real", Johnny Cash – "A Thing Called Love"
6	"Episode 6"	Peter Kay	Paul Coleman, Sian Gibson, Peter Kay & Tim Reid	22 May 2015	5.78
Kayleigh has a lot on her mind, as she is moving into her sister Mandy's tomorrow, so the last thing she needs is to be dressed as a blackcurrant for National Jam Week. Luckily, John is on hand to give her some encouragement. They decide to have a goodbye breakfast Fat Boy to commemorate their last car share day together. As they drive home, a jealous Kayleigh is annoyed when she discovers Rachel from work has John's number. Kayleigh ponders how much she'll miss the journeys to work with John. The episode features a 1950s faux fantasy sequence to the 1988 song "Rush Hour" by Jane Wiedlin. After an awkward exchange of gifts, where John gives Kayleigh a novelty heart lamp, and gets a kiss on the cheek from Kayleigh, the episode ends with John playing "Pure and Simple'" by Hear'Say on Now 48, his CD gift from Kayleigh, with a handwritten note telling John she dedicates the song to him. Forever FM playlist: John Farnham – "You're the Voice", Deacon Blue – "Chocolate Girl", Kid Creole and the Coconuts – "Annie, I'm Not Your Daddy", Steve Winwood – "Valerie", Rick Astley – "Cry for Help", Right Said Fred – "Don't Talk Just Kiss", Haircut One Hundred – "Love Plus One", Paul McCartney & Stevie Wonder – "Ebony and Ivory", Joan Jett – "I Love Rock 'n' Roll", The Feeling – "Never Be Lonely", Amy Grant – "Baby Baby", Jane Wiedlin – "Rush Hour", Extreme – "More Than Words" Other songs played: Compendium – "In the City", Hear'Say – "Pure and Simple"

=== Short (2016) ===
No.	Title	Directed by	Written by	Original release date	UK viewers (millions)
N–A	"Peter Kay's Christmas Comedy Shuffle"	Peter Kay	Paul Coleman, Sian Gibson, Peter Kay & Tim Reid	24 December 2016	4.56
Kayleigh gets John to play her Now That's What I Call Christmas album on their journey to work in the height of summer. It is possible this scene is meant to take place on John and Kayleigh's second day of car sharing, as Kayleigh says in the first episode that she will bring her Christmas CD for the next day's journey. This previously unseen three-minute scene was exclusive to Peter Kay's Christmas Comedy Shuffle. (Peter Kay's Comedy Shuffle also includes various Car Share outtakes.) Forever FM playlist: Mariah Carey – "All I Want for Christmas Is You" Other songs played: Wizzard – "I Wish It Could Be Christmas Everyday", Mud – "Lonely This Christmas", Jona Lewie – "Stop the Cavalry", Wham! – "Last Christmas"

=== Series 2 (2017) ===
No.	Title	Directed by	Written by	Original release date	UK viewers (millions)
1	"Episode 1"	Peter Kay	Paul Coleman, Sian Gibson & Peter Kay	11 April 2017	9.43
After moving in with her sister Mandy and her family, Kayleigh is now travelling to work on her own by bus and train, but cannot resist temptation and repeatedly calls John. Eventually, after many phone calls between them, John secretly gives Kayleigh the directions to his car and the pair are reunited. After a bout of road rage, a video is produced of John verbally abusing and threatening a cyclist, which goes viral, much to the amusement of Kayleigh. It is raining after work so John offers her a lift home, where he meets and bonds with her brother-in-law Steve (Guy Garvey), who is obsessed with bikes, and tells Kayleigh he will keep giving her lifts to work every morning even though it will take him an extra 45 minutes to do so. Forever FM playlist: Jermaine Stewart – "We Don't Have to Take Our Clothes Off", Enigma – "Sadeness (Part I)', The Spinners – "Working My Way Back to You", Bardo – "One Step Further", Ronan Keating – "Life Is a Rollercoaster", Gwen Stefani – "The Sweet Escape", Wet Wet Wet – "Sweet Little Mystery", REO Speedwagon – "Can't Fight This Feeling" Other songs played: Hear'Say – "Pure and Simple", S Club 7 – "Never Had a Dream Come True", Pointer Sisters – "Jump (For My Love)"
2	"Episode 2"	Peter Kay	Paul Coleman, Sian Gibson & Peter Kay	18 April 2017	7.66
John and Kayleigh are full of high spirits as they head off on their annual works do, dressed as Harry Potter and Hagrid, but things don't go according to plan when John is lumbered with taking both drunk colleague Elsie (Conleth Hill), who is dressed as Smurfette, and a drunk Kayleigh home. Elsie's mischievous nature makes John feel uncomfortable, alongside Elsie's constant spilling of store gossip – including some about John and Kayleigh. After taking Elsie home, John and Kayleigh begin to get close but their moment is interrupted when Elsie rings up to say that she has left her inhaler in the car and can't breathe, leaving a flustered John with no other choice but to drive all the way back to her home. Forever FM playlist: Divinyls – "I Touch Myself", JX – "Son of a Gun", Livin' Joy – "Dreamer", Crazy Frog – "Axel F", Urban Cookie Collective – "The Key the Secret", Kelis – "Milkshake", Fat Larry's Band – "Zoom", Minnie Riperton – "Lovin' You", Phyllis Nelson – "Move Closer", Scorpions – "Wind of Change", Spice Girls – "2 Become 1", Martine McCutcheon – "Perfect Moment", Madonna – "Crazy for You", Champaign – "How 'Bout Us", Will to Power – "Baby, I Love Your Way/Freebird Medley", Brenda Russell – "Piano in the Dark", Phil Collins – "A Groovy Kind of Love", Donna Lewis – "I Love You Always Forever", Scritti Politti – "Oh Patti"
3	"Episode 3"	Peter Kay	Paul Coleman, Sian Gibson & Peter Kay	25 April 2017	7.45
Kayleigh has had enough of work and fancies a day off but John disapproves of the idea, as he has to visit the store manager and his best friend Ian "Litchy" Litchfield, at the Wigan branch. Eventually, he agrees to ditching work (after visiting his friend Litchy at the Wigan store) and decides to go to Seaview Safari Park with Kayleigh. As the pair enjoy a picnic in the car, they become startled as monkeys fight and begin to use John's car as a climbing frame. When John and Kayleigh share another moment by the coast, a mysterious yellow substance pours down the windscreen, which John realises is one of the monkeys who has followed them from Seaview Safari on the car roof, urinating on the roof of his car. The baby monkey attacks John and Kayleigh, but they eventually manage to get him in the car, where he causes more trouble. They fail to send him back to Seaview Safari, as it has closed for the day. Eventually, John manages to get the monkey collected and sent to a place of safety. Forever FM playlist: Sophie B. Hawkins – "Damn I Wish I Was Your Lover", Wilson Phillips – "Hold On", INXS – "Disappear", Lloyd Cole – "Lost Weekend", Salt-n-Pepa – Push It", Climie Fisher – "Love Changes (Everything)", The Pretenders – "Don't Get Me Wrong", Train – "Drops of Jupiter", Edwin Starr – "H.A.P.P.Y. Radio", Shakira – "Hips Don't Lie", George Michael – "Monkey"
4	"Episode 4"	Peter Kay	Paul Coleman, Sian Gibson & Peter Kay	2 May 2017	7.21
John enlists the help of his Nana Rose reluctantly to wait in for a parcel delivery. Kayleigh can't find her house key and is stuck inside her sister Mandy's house so John attempts to pick the lock with a hair pin before resorting to trying to pull Kayleigh out through a small window, which doesn't go according to plan. John and Kayleigh chat about her favourite film Dirty Dancing and Michael Jackson on their way to work. On the way back, Kayleigh keeps asking John whether he thinks they are an us, and whether he would like them to see each other more, but he keeps dodging her questions. As the pair sit stuck in gridlock, Kayleigh declares her love for John and believes that he doesn't feel the same way, so she leaves the car and gets into a taxi while crying. She just misses a dedication John had sent in to Forever FM, which is his own way of declaring his love for her. In a daydream, John is seen walking and jumping over other cars to the taxi where he finds Kayleigh, takes her hand and tells her he loves her, too; then, they kiss in the road with the other drivers and passengers who got out of their cars cheering. In reality, in a phone call to Nana Rose, John says that he is "done" as Kayleigh's taxi starts moving again. It looks like he has given up on her, but has he really? Forever FM playlist: Melle Mel – "White Lines (Don't Don't Do It)", Ph.D. – "I Won't Let You Down", Neneh Cherry – "Buffalo Stance", Giorgio Moroder & Philip Oakey – "Together in Electric Dreams", Imagination – "Body Talk", Billy Ocean – "Red Light Spells Danger", Crash Test Dummies – "Mmm Mmm Mmm Mmm", George Michael – "Praying for Time", Marillion – "Kayleigh"

=== Final specials (2018) ===
Despite initially saying that the series ended with Series 2 Episode 4, on 17 November 2017 it was announced during Children in Need that the show would return for an unscripted episode, as well as a final televised episode to end the series in 2018. The unscripted episode aired on 7 May and the final televised episode, which sees John and Kayleigh beginning a romantic relationship together, aired on 28 May. Writing in The Daily Telegraph, Veronica Lee gave the episode five stars out of five, describing the final episode as "perfect, uproarious, adorable", while Simon Binns, of the Manchester Evening News, commented: "It's cheesy, feel good, but lacks the drama of the previous episode."

No.	Title	Directed by	Written by	Original release date	UK viewers (millions)
5	"Unscripted"	Peter Kay	Unknown	7 May 2018	7.07
Note: Chronologically, this episode takes place somewhere before series 2 episode 4. On the Complete Collection Blu-ray/DVD set, this episode is classed as series 2 episode 2. In this mostly improvised one-off episode, John and Kayleigh drive through Salford from work, commenting on the songs and adverts playing on Forever FM, and talking about everything from what the U stands for in club sandwich to films they have never seen. Kayleigh says her first boyfriend was called Danny ("but he was a 'holding hands' boyfriend"). John, in contrast, says he was having sex when he was 13. At the end of the episode, John tells Kayleigh men have needs, and hints he wants to have sex with her, but she does not seem keen. She would rather snuggle on the sofa with a takeaway and accidentally on purpose invites herself round to John's for a dinner date. Note: On the Complete Collection DVD and Blu-Ray releases, this episode is inserted into the running order as episode 2. After the final specials aired, Kay confirmed they were initially filmed in the series 2 recording block, but two episodes were held back for the following year. Forever FM playlist: Edwyn Collins – "A Girl Like You", Trio – 'Da Da Da", Martika – "Toy Soldiers", Fine Young Cannibals – "Ever Fallen in Love (With Someone You Shouldn't've)", The Belle Stars – "Sign of the Times", The Divine Comedy – "National Express", Four Tops – "Loco in Acapulco", Bee Gees – "More Than a Woman", Madonna – "Borderline", Danny Wilson – "The Second Summer of Love" {No day dream}
6	"The Finale"	Peter Kay	Paul Coleman, Sian Gibson & Peter Kay	28 May 2018	8.88
Set the day after Series 2 Episode 4, John arrives at Kayleigh's house at dawn, leaving a present for her with Steve. He drives to work alone, checking his phone constantly for a message from Kayleigh. She opens her present on the bus: it's a Walkman containing an original song from John, which he had stayed up all night to record, as an apology. The song is accompanied by a parody video to "Back for Good" by Take That. John picks her up from the meeting spot as seen in the first episode of the second series. Arriving at work, they admit their feelings for each other, and agree to take things slowly. After work, they discuss a wedding invite from their colleagues, and treat themselves to a drive-through meal. While stopped at traffic lights, Kayleigh suddenly leaves the car to rescue a hedgehog in the road, causing a traffic collision behind her. As John gets out to help, his car door is knocked off by a passing van. John and Kayleigh ride home on the bus, listening to John's homemade song and holding hands. Forever FM playlist: Yes – "Owner of a Lonely Heart", Annie Lennox – "Waiting in Vain", Another Level – "Freak Me", Transvision Vamp – "Baby I Don't Care", Big Audio Dynamite – "E=MC2", Joan Armatrading – "Drop the Pilot", Wax – "Bridge to Your Heart" Other songs played: John Redmond – "Come Back My Car Share Buddy"

=== Audio special (2020) ===
No.	Title	Directed by	Written by	Original release date	UK viewers (millions)
N–A	"Car Share – An Audio Special"	Peter Kay	Peter Kay & Sian Gibson	10 April 2020	N/A (audio only)
An audio-only special eavesdropping on John and Kayleigh as they make another average day's journey to work, talking about the past, from Benny Hill to play parks, released on BBC iPlayer. Unlike the visual episodes, this episode ends when they arrive at work, without a return journey. Forever FM playlist: John Paul Young – "Love Is in the Air", Billy Ocean – "Get Outta My Dreams, Get into My Car", Justin Timberlake – "Can't Stop the Feeling!", Culture Club – "Church of the Poison Mind", Eternal feat. BeBe Winans – "I Wanna Be the Only One", S Club 7 – "Reach"

Peter Kay's Car Share : UK viewers per episode (millions)
Audience measurement performed by Broadcasters' Audience Research Board
