= Hill Street Blues (theme) =

Single by Mike Post
- B-side: "Aaron's Tune"
- Released: August 1981
- Genre: Pop
- Length: 3:05
- Label: Elektra
- Songwriter: Mike Post
- Producer: Mike Post

Mike Post singles chronology
"Manhattan Spiritual" (1975)	"Hill Street Blues" (1981)	"Theme from Magnum, P.I." (1982)

Video
- "Hill Street Blues" (theme) on YouTube

"Hill Street Blues" is a 1981 instrumental by Mike Post. It is the theme from the TV series Hill Street Blues, and features Larry Carlton on guitar.

The single spent over five months on the charts and reached number 10 on the U.S. Billboard Hot 100. It became an Adult Contemporary hit in the U.S. (No. 4) and Canada (No. 29). It became Post's second Top 10 hit, matching the performance of his first hit in 1975, "Theme from The Rockford Files". The single also charted in the UK (No. 25).

At the 24th Annual Grammy Awards in 1982, the song won the Grammy for Best Pop Instrumental Performance with Grammys awarded to Mike Post & Larry Carlton.

== Notable covers ==
- Jazz pianist Rodney Franklin on his 1981 LP, Endless Flight.
- Richard Clayderman on Special Requests 2001.

== Chart history ==
=== Weekly charts ===
Chart (1981–82)	Peak position
Australia (Kent Music Report)	44
Canadian RPM Adult Contemporary	29
UK	25
U.S. Billboard Hot 100	10
U.S. Billboard Easy Listening	4
U.S. Cash Box Top 100	15

=== Year-end charts ===
Chart (1981)	Rank
U.S. Billboard Adult Contemporary	38
