= Sian Gibson =

Welsh actress and writer (born 1976)

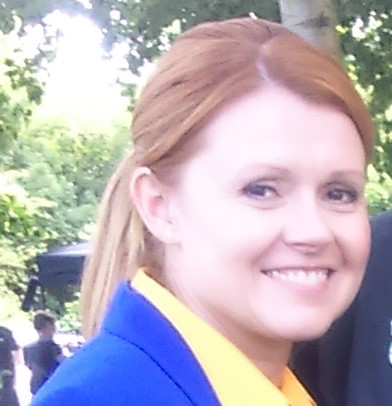
- Gibson on the set of Murder on the Blackpool Express in 2017
- Born: Sian Foulkes; 1976 (age 49–50); Mold, Flintshire, Wales
- Education: University of Salford
- Occupations: Comedy actress, writer
- Years active: 1997–2008, 2015–present
- Notable work: Peter Kay's Car Share; The Power of Parker; Mammoth
- Spouse: Ian Gibson
- Children: 1
- Awards: BAFTA – Best Scripted Comedy (2016); NTA – Most Popular Comedy Series (2016); British Screenwriters' Awards (2016) – Best Comedy Writing on Television; RTS NW Awards (2015, 2024) – Best Comedy Programme

Sian Gibson (née Foulkes; born 1976) is a Welsh comedy actress and television writer. She co-wrote and co-starred in the sitcom Peter Kay's Car Share, alongside Kay, for which she won the 2016 BAFTA TV Award for Best Scripted Comedy and the National Television Award for Best Comedy.

Between 2017 and 2024, Gibson appeared as Gemma in 11 original UKTV films from the Murder on the Blackpool Express and Murder, They Hope series. She co-wrote and co-starred in the Royal Television Society's North West award-winning show The Power of Parker, and later joined the cast of Mammoth.

== Early life ==
Gibson was born and raised in Mold, Flintshire, Wales. Her father was a builder and her mother a housewife. She joined the local youth theatre in Theatr Clwyd. She studied performing arts at the University of Salford, where she met fellow students – and future stand-up comedians – Peter Kay and Steve Edge.

== Career ==
=== Early work ===
After gaining a HND for Media Performance, Gibson quickly got an agent. She had a series of small credits in the late 1990s and early 2000s, including Peak Practice, Hospital People and Emmerdale. She played Tessie Thompson in Channel 4 soap Hollyoaks during 1998 and 1999, returning in autumn 2007 for four further appearances. Gibson also played Trish in a trio of episodes of The League of Gentlemen.

More work came her way alongside Kay, including "The Services" episode of Channel 4's Comedy Lab, the "Eyes Down" episode of That Peter Kay Thing – and then a role as Young Mary in three episodes of Phoenix Nights. There were also cameos in Kay's music video for the Texas song "Sleep", as well as the Geraldine McQueen song "Once Upon a Christmas Song" as her Britain's Got the Pop Factor... and Possibly a New Celebrity Jesus Christ Soapstar Superstar Strictly on Ice character, Wendy.

Outside of those jobs with Kay, aside from "parts which were three lines", other roles seemed elusive, with Gibson saying acting had largely "run its course" towards the middle of the 2000s.

=== Premature retirement ===
The struggle for acting work was "soul-destroying" and, with a mortgage to pay, Gibson moved to Mold, north Wales, with husband Ian and their daughter, Gracie. She worked at a call centre for Card One Banking, where her co-workers had little idea she had previously been an actress.

"I hit 30 and had to stop ... I started temping in a bank. Peter [Kay] was always really supportive and put me in his stuff, but I wasn't getting much else. One day, I found myself thinking: I haven't had an audition or casting call for so long, and I looked at my agent's website and I wasn't on it any more. I thought: that's sad. But I accepted it. I'd always wanted to act but I wasn't from an acting family. My dad was a builder, and my mum had worked in a factory. So I got married and was working in a call centre in north Wales."

Meanwhile, in 2013, Kay had received the script that became Peter Kay's Car Share from Paul Coleman and Tim Reid. Although Kay loved the idea, he initially had no intention of appearing in the series.

"I met up with Sian for one of our regular catch-ups. They usually consisted of lunch followed by a drive, where we'd put the world to rights to a playlist of classic hits that we'd both sing along to. That's when it suddenly dawned on me. This was, in essence, Car Share." – Peter Kay

After that, Kay asked Gibson whether she wanted to work with them on the script. Main characters John and Kayleigh were originally meant to be slightly younger – but the four rewrote the script to fit Kay and Gibson into the roles. Even with that, Kay said it was a struggle to convince bosses that Gibson was right for the role of Kayleigh, saying they preferred "somebody who's well known". He convinced them, insisting their "real-life chemistry could be the secret ingredient to the show's success".

At first, Gibson didn't tell her call centre bosses that she was leaving to work on the show, instead saying she was struggling with child care.

The show was broadcast in spring 2015, becoming an instant hit, and breaking BBC iPlayer viewing figures, with 2.8 million people watching before it was broadcast on BBC One.

=== Return to acting ===
As well as Car Share's successful viewing figures, the show brought a series of accolades for Gibson herself. As co-writer alongside Kay, Coleman and Reid, she won a BAFTA, National Television Award, Broadcast Award, and Broadcasting Press Guild Award. The quartet were also nominated for a pair of Royal Television Society Awards.

Gibson herself was nominated for individual acting awards from BAFTA, the Royal Television Society and the Broadcasting Press Guild.

April 2017 saw the second series of Car Share, with Gibson continuing to co-write alongside Kay, Coleman and Reid – plus co-star with Kay. The second series became more popular than the first, with more than 10 million iPlayer requests that made it "the most popular comedy of the year by far."

The success of the show brought Gibson to wider prominence and opened the door for other roles. Alongside Johnny Vegas, she was cast as Gemma Draper in UKTV's 2017 TV movie Murder on the Blackpool Express. With 1.8 million viewers, the comedy murder mystery became Gold's highest-rated show, and was later rebroadcast on BBC Two.

In 2018, Gibson guest-starred in an episode of Death in Paradise. She also appeared in the "Bernie Clifton's Dressing Room" episode of Inside No. 9. Multiple publications later ranked the episode as one of the best among the show's 11-year, 55-episode run.

She also played Natasha, the wife of main character Romesh, in two series of Romesh Ranganathan's The Reluctant Landlord across 2018 and 2019.

Taskmaster series eight, in 2019, saw Gibson participate alongside Joe Thomas, Iain Stirling, Lou Sanders and Paul Sinha. She finished fourth, winning episodes four and six.

Later the same year, she co-starred as Cinderella in Sky's TV movie Cinderella: After Ever After alongside David Walliams, Tom Courtenay and Celia Imrie. The Sky One film was shown on Christmas Eve.

Alongside that other work, following the success of Murder on the Blackpool Express, Gibson and Vegas reprised their roles for the sequels, Death on the Tyne (2018) and Dial M for Middlesbrough (2019). UKTV commissioned a full series based on the viewing figures for the three movies. Re-titled Murder, They Hope, the pair continued as Terry and Gemma for six further films and a Christmas special between 2021 and 2023. A separate, though connected, TV movie – Apocalypse Slough – came in 2024. In all, Gibson has played Gemma Draper in 11 TV movies.

=== Continued work ===
Gibson returned to writing, with 2023's BBC One-commissioned The Power of Parker. Alongside Car Share writer Coleman, Gibson co-wrote all six episodes of the 1990s-set, Stockport-based, sitcom. She also played the main character, Kath Pennington.

The show's first series averaged 2.2 million viewers on iPlayer across its first month, making it the biggest new scripted comedy of 2023. The show was commissioned for a second series in May 2024.

There was also critical success, with the show winning best comedy programme at the Royal Television Society's North West awards for 2024. Gibson was also nominated for best performance in a comedy, with Joe Gilgun taking the win.

The second run of six episodes was set two years after the first, and broadcast in June 2025.

As well as acting in her own show, Gibson was added to the cast of BBC sitcom Mammoth in 2024. She played Mel Jones, the grown-up daughter of main character Tony Mammoth for three episodes. Creator Mike Bubbins pushed for Gibson, despite resistance she wasn't Welsh enough.

"When I suggested Sian Gibson to play my daughter, someone said: 'We'd rather somebody Welsh.' I said: 'She's from Mold, in north Wales. She just doesn't sound like what you think is Welsh.'"

The series was recommissioned for a full run of eight episodes and a Christmas special, with Gibson reprising her role. In March 2025, BBC chairman Samir Shah described the show as "brilliant".

== Personal life ==
Gibson is married to Ian Gibson, a gas fitter. They have a daughter, Gracie, who was born in 2013.

== Filmography ==
=== Film ===
Year	Title	Role	Notes
2026	Stuffed	Debbie	

=== TV ===
Year	Title	Role	Notes
1997	Peak Practice	Sandra	One episode
1997	Where the Heart Is	Cheese Counter Girl	One episode
1997	The Grand	Florence	One episode
1998–1999, 2007	Hollyoaks	Tessie Thompson	Four episodes
1998	Comedy Lab	Alison	"The Services"
1999	That Peter Kay Thing	Yvonne	Guest: series 1, episode 2 – "Eyes Down"
1999–2000, 2017	The League of Gentlemen	Trish	Three episodes – "Lust for Royston Vasey", "The One-Armed Man Is King" (credited as Sian Foulkes) and "Return to Royston Vasey" (credited as Sian Gibson)
2001	Phoenix Nights	(Young) Mary	Three episodes
2002	Emmerdale	Suzie Brown	Two episodes
2005	Marian, Again	Fiona	TV film (credited as Sian Foulkes)
2008	Britain's Got the Pop Factor... and Possibly a New Celebrity Jesus Christ Soapstar Superstar Strictly on Ice	Wendy from the group 2 Up 2 Down	
2015–2018, 2020	Peter Kay's Car Share	Kayleigh Kitson	Main role; co-writer (with Peter Kay, Paul Coleman and Tim Reid)
2016	Do Not Disturb	Sheila	Co-star, with Catherine Tate & Miles Jupp
2017	Hospital People	Hillary	Guest: series 1, episode 2 – "The Security Threat"
2017	Murder on the Blackpool Express	Gemma	Main role, alongside Johnny Vegas
2018	Inside No. 9	Leanne	Guest: series 4, episode 2 – "Bernie Clifton's Dressing Room"
2018	Death in Paradise	Gilly Wright	Guest: series 7, episode 3 – "Written in Murder"
2018	Would I Lie to You?	Herself	Panellist: series 12, episode 7. Lee's team, with James Acaster
2018	Death on the Tyne	Gemma	Main role, sequel to Murder on the Blackpool Express
2018–2019	The Reluctant Landlord	Natasha	Main role: two series, 13 episodes
2019	Taskmaster	Contestant	Panellist: series 8, 10 episodes
2019	Dial M for Middlesbrough	Gemma	Main role, third in the Murder on the Blackpool Express trilogy
2019	Cinderella: After Ever After	Cinderella	Co-star, alongside David Walliams
2020	The Grand Party Hotel	Narrator	BBC One documentary
2021–2024	Murder, They Hope	Gemma	Main role: Six movies & two specials
2021	Johnny Vegas: Carry On Glamping	Narrator	Channel 4 mini-series
2021	Beauty and the Beast: A Pantomime for Comic Relief	Ma	Television pantomime
2022	The Cleaner	Sis	Guest: Christmas special 2022: "A Clean Christmas"
2023–present	The Power of Parker	Kath	Main role & co-writer
2024	David & Jay's Touring Toolshed	Narrator	BBC One Series
2024–present	Mammoth	Mel Jones	Main role: two series, 12 episodes
2025	Death Valley	Wendy Harries	Guest: series 1, episode 4
2025	Mandy	Janice	Guest: series 4, episode 1: "Petty Woman"
2026	The Witch Farm	Bethan	

=== Audio ===
Date	Format	Title	Role	Source
May 2016	BBC Radio 4 Drama	School Drama	Acting role: Michelle	
February 2021	Podcast	The Taskmaster Podcast	Featured guest	
May 2025	BBC Radio 4	Woman's Hour	Featured guest	

== Accolades ==
Show	Series	Awards	Category	Other nominees	Result	Ref.
Peter Kay's Car Share	1	BAFTA TV Awards 2016	Best Scripted Comedy (nominated alongside Peter Kay, Gill Isles, Paul Coleman)	Chewing Gum; Peep Show; People Do Nothing	Won	
Peter Kay's Car Share	1	BAFTA TV Awards 2016	Best Female Performance in a Comedy	Michaela Coel – Chewing Gum; Miranda Hart – Miranda; Sharon Horgan – Catastrophe	Nominated	
Peter Kay's Car Share	1	National Television Awards 2016	Most Popular Comedy Series (nominated alongside Peter Kay, Gill Isles, Paul Coleman, Tim Reid)	Benidorm; Birds of a Feather; Not Going Out	Won	
Peter Kay's Car Share	1	Royal Television Society Awards 2016	Breakthrough Star	Michaela Coel; Richard Bentley	Nominated	
Peter Kay's Car Share	1	Royal Television Society Awards 2016	Best Scripted Comedy (nominated alongside Peter Kay, Gill Isles, Paul Coleman, Tim Reid)	Catastrophe; People Just Do Nothing	Nominated	
Peter Kay's Car Share	1	Royal Television Society Awards 2016	Best Writer (Comedy) (nominated alongside Peter Kay, Gill Isles, Paul Coleman, Tim Reid)	Rob Delaney & Sharon Horgan – Catastrophe; Michaela Coel – Chewing Gum	Nominated	
Peter Kay's Car Share	1	Broadcast Awards 2016	Best Comedy Programme (nominated alongside Peter Kay, Gill Isles, Paul Coleman, Tim Reid)	Catastrophe; Detectorists; Inside No. 9; The Keith Lemon Sketch Show; People Just Do Nothing	Nominated	
Peter Kay's Car Share	1	Broadcast Awards 2016	Best Original Programme (nominated alongside Peter Kay, Gill Isles, Paul Coleman, Tim Reid)	Ballot Monkeys; Cyber Bully; Murder in Successville; No Offence; The Tribe	Won	
Peter Kay's Car Share	1	Broadcasting Press Guild Awards 2016	Best Comedy (nominated alongside Peter Kay, Gill Isles, Paul Coleman, Tim Reid)	Catastrophe; Detectorists; Hunderby	Nominated	
Peter Kay's Car Share	1	Broadcasting Press Guild Awards 2016	Best Made for Online (Digital First) (nominated alongside Peter Kay, Gill Isles, Paul Coleman, Tim Reid)	Adam Curtis: Bitter Lake; The Man in the High Castle; Ripper Street	Won	
Peter Kay's Car Share	1	Broadcasting Press Guild Awards 2016	Breakthrough Artist	Aidan Turner – Poldark; Gemma Chan – Humans; Michaela Coel – Chewing Gum	Nominated	
Peter Kay's Car Share	1	British Screenwriters' Awards 2016	Best Comedy Writing on Television (nominated alongside Peter Kay, Paul Coleman, Tim Reid)	Michaela Coel – Chewing Gum; Jim Field Smith & George Kay – Stag; Keith Akushie, Daran Johnson, Joe Parham & Lucien Young – Siblings; Rob Delaney & Sharon Horgan – Catastrophe	Won	
Peter Kay's Car Share	1	Royal Television Society NW Awards 2015	Best Script Writer (nominated alongside Peter Kay, Paul Coleman, Tim Reid)	Debbie Oates – Coronation Street; Danny Brocklehurst – Ordinary Lies; Russell T Davies – Banana	Won	
Peter Kay's Car Share	1	Royal Television Society NW Awards 2015	Best Performance in a Comedy	Peter Kay – Peter Kay's Car Share; Vic Reeves and Bob Mortimer – House of Fools; Morgana Robinson – House of Fools	Nominated	
Peter Kay's Car Share	2	BAFTA TV Awards 2018	Best Female Performance in a Comedy	Daisy May Cooper – This Country; Anna Maxwell Martin – Motherland; Sharon Horgan – Catastrophe	Nominated	
Peter Kay's Car Share	2	BAFTA Awards, Cymru 2019	Yr Actores Orau (Best Actress)	Gabrielle Creevy – In My Skin; Jodie Whittaker – Doctor Who; Eiry Thomas – Enid a Lucy	Nominated	
Peter Kay's Car Share	2	Royal Television Society Awards 2019	Best Comedy Performance (Female)	Lesley Manville – Mum; Daisy May Cooper – This Country	Nominated	
The Power of Parker	1	Royal Television Society NW Awards 2024	Best Performance in a Comedy	Joe Gilgun – Brassic; Rosie Cavaliero – The Power of Parker; Conleth Hill – The Power of Parker	Nominated	
The Power of Parker	1	Royal Television Society NW Awards 2024	Best Comedy Programme (nominated alongside Paul Coleman)	Brassic: Series 5; G'wed; Inside No.9: Series 9	Won	
The Power of Parker	1	Comedy.co.uk Awards 2023	Best New TV Sitcom (nominated alongside Paul Coleman)	Queen of Oz; Black Ops; Everyone Else Burns; Such Brave Girls; The Change	Nominated	
The Power of Parker	1	I Talk Telly Awards 2023	Best New Comedy (nominated alongside Paul Coleman)	Changing Ends; Black Ops; Dreaming Whilst Black; Extraordinary; Juice; Ruby Speaking; Significant Other	Nominated	
The Power of Parker	1	I Talk Telly Awards 2023	Best Comedy Partnership (nominated alongside Rosie Cavaliero)	David Tennant & Michael Sheen – Staged; Charlotte Ritchie & Kiell Smith-Bynoe – Ghosts; Daisy Haggard & Martin Freeman – Breeders; Harriet Dyer & Patrick Brammall – Colin from Accounts; Jon Richardson & Lucy Beaumont – Meet the Richardsons; Katherine Parkinson & Youssef Kerkour – Significant Other; Reece Shearsmith & Steve Pemberton – Inside No. 9	Nominated	
