= Night at the Museum: Battle of the Smithsonian (soundtrack) =

Night at the Museum: Battle of the Smithsonian (Original Motion Picture Soundtrack)

Film score by Alan Silvestri
- Released: May 19, 2009
- Recorded: January–May 2009
- Studios: Newman Scoring Stage, 20th Century Fox Studios, Los Angeles
- Genre: Film score
- Length: 49:51
- Label: Varèse Sarabande
- Producers: Alan Silvestri; David Bifano

Alan Silvestri chronology
Beowulf (2007)	Night at the Museum: Battle of the Smithsonian (2009)	G.I. Joe: The Rise of Cobra (2009)

Night at the Museum: Battle of the Smithsonian (Original Motion Picture Soundtrack) is the film score composed and conducted by Alan Silvestri to the 2009 fantasy comedy film Night at the Museum: Battle of the Smithsonian directed by Shawn Levy. The second instalment in the franchise, it is the sequel to Night at the Museum (2006) starring Ben Stiller, Amy Adams, Owen Wilson, Hank Azaria, Christopher Guest, Alain Chabat and Robin Williams. The film score was released through Varèse Sarabande on May 19, 2009.

== Background ==
Alan Silvestri, who previously composed Night at the Museum returned to score the sequel. Silvestri had initially prioritized working on Robert Zemeckis' directorial A Christmas Carol (2009) before this film, but as the film's date was scheduled for May 2009, Silvestri halted working on the score to prioritize this film by late-January 2009. Silvestri reused the themes for the first film and modified it with a new orchestration and amplified scales, so that the thematic material remained intact, it can be used in broader sequences. He also composed fresh themes for the sequel as well.

Recording commenced at the Newman Scoring Stage in 20th Century Fox Studios, Los Angeles; Silvestri conducted the 103-piece orchestra and 18-member choir from the Hollywood Studio Symphony, which was orchestrated by Abe Libbos and John Ashton Thomas. Varèse Sarabande issued the score on May 19, 2009.

== Critical reception ==
Mark Morton of AllMusic wrote "Silvestri employs the Hollywood Studio Symphony, a massive 103-piece orchestra and 18-person choir to bring the sequel to mirthful life." Jonathan Broxton of Movie Music UK wrote "Quite unexpectedly, this is a significant improvement on the rather tiresome original, and makes for a fun romp of score." Thomas Glorieux of Maintitles called it a "standard Silvestri material" using the same style of the first film score, "but in moments and thankfully in longer tracks as well, it does deliver you moments of Silvestri happiness that sooth our mind for just a while."

Michael Quinn of BBC wrote "There's much to like here in the sheer energy and obvious artistry of the scoring, but there isn't much that grabs the imagination or stays with you afterwards." James Southall of Movie Wave wrote "Night at the Museum: Battle of the Smithsonian is no doubt a perfectly fine film score, but it's one which just doesn't work as an album – there are simply too many ideas, too much going into the mix, and nothing gets enough attention." Christian Clemmensen of Filmtracks wrote "How you value straight redundancy will determine your interest level in this most predictable sequel work." Lael Lowenstein of Variety wrote "Alan Silvestri's score is overblown." Nick Venable of Cinemablend wrote "The score by Alan Silvestri is masterful, but almost distractingly so, because it takes over anytime there isn't a line-off between the more comedic actors in the cast."

== Track listing ==
All tracks are written by Alan Silvestri.

Night at the Museum: Battle of the Smithsonian (Original Motion Picture Soundtrack)
No.	Title	Length
1.	"Night at the Museum: Battle of the Smithsonian"	02:38
2.	"Daley Devices"	00:36
3.	"This Night is Their Last"	04:35
4.	"To Washington"	00:37
5.	"Getting Past Security"	01:49
6.	"Finding Jed and the Others"	03:16
7.	"I Have Come Back to Life"	01:04
8.	"The Tablet"	03:25
9.	"I Smell Adventure"	04:31
10.	"He Doesn't Have All Night"	01:46
11.	"The Adventure Continues"	03:25
12.	"Octavius Attacks"	01:22
13.	"Entering the Air & Space Museum"	01:32
14.	"Escape in Wright Flyer"	03:29
15.	"Got the Combination"	02:19
16.	"Gate to the Underworld"	01:02
17.	"I Ride the Squirrel"	01:25
18.	"On Your Toes"	01:54
19.	"The Battle"	01:44
20.	"Divide the House"	01:28
21.	"Victory is Ours"	01:19
22.	"Goodbye"	02:43
23.	"Museum Open Late"	02:02
Total length:		49:51

== Additional music ==
The following songs are included in the film, but not in the soundtrack:

1. "More Than a Woman" – performed by the Jonas Brothers cherubs while Larry and Amelia hide from Napoleon's army.
2. "My Heart Will Go On" – performed by the Jonas Brothers cherubs after Larry and Amelia kiss.
3. "Lovebug" – performed by the Jonas Brothers cherubs after Larry and Amelia kiss.
4. "Let's Groove" – performed by Earth, Wind & Fire; used during the final scene.
5. "Fly with Me" – performed by the Jonas Brothers in the end credits.

== Album credits ==
Credits adapted from liner notes:

- Music composer – Alan Silvestri
- Producer – Alan Silvestri, David Bifano
- Engineer – Denis St. Amand
- Recordist – Tim Lauber
- Recording – Dennis Sands, Steve Kempster, Adam Olmstead, Larry Mah
- Mixing – Dennis Sands, Steve Kempster
- Mastering – Patricia Sullivan Fourstar
- Music editor – Terry Wilson
- Music production coordinator – Rebecca Morellato
- Score coordinator – David Bifano
- Copyist – Joann Kane Music Services
- Executive producer – Robert Townson
- Music business affairs for 20th Century Fox – Tom Cavanaugh
- Music supervision – Danielle Diego
- Executive in charge of music for 20th Century Fox – Robert Kraft

Orchestra

- Performer – Hollywood Studio Symphony
- Conductor – Alan Silvestri
- Orchestrator – Abraham Libbos, David Metzger, John Ashton Thomas
- Score contractor – Peter Rotter, Sandy de Crescent
- Concertmaster – Julie Ann Gigante
- Stage manager – Francesco Perlangeli, Tom Steel

Instruments

- Bass – Christian Kollgaard, David Parmeter, Donald Ferrone, Drew Dembowski, Edward Meares, Michael Valerio, Nico Abondolo, Oscar Hidalgo, Richard Feves, Stephen Dress, Timothy Eckert
- Bassoon – Allen Savedoff, Kenneth Munday, Michael O'Donovan, Peter Mandell
- Cello – Dennis Karmazyn,^{[P]} Andrew Shulman, Armen Ksajikian, Cecilia Tsan, Christina Soule, David Low, Erika Duke-Kirkpatrick, George Kim Scholes, Paul Cohen, Timothy Landauer
- Clarinet – Gary Bovyer,^{[P]} Gene Burkert, Ralph Williams, Stuart Clark
- Flute – David Shostac, Geraldine Rotella, Heather Clark, Jennifer Olson, James Walker
- Guitar – George Doering
- Harp – Katie Kirkpatrick,^{[P]} Marcia Dickstein
- Horn – James Thatcher,^{[P]} Brian O'Connor, David Duke, Katharine Dennis, Mark Adams, Phillip Edward Yao, Richard Todd, Steven Becknell, William Lane
- Oboe – David Weiss,^{[P]} Barbara Northcutt, Chris Bleth, Jonathan Davis, Leslie Reed
- Percussion – Alan Estes,^{[P]} Dan Greco, Donald Williams, Gregory Goodall, Peter Limonick, Steven Schaeffer
- Piano – Randy Kerber
- Saxophone – Daniel Higgins,^{[P]} Bill Liston, Greg Huckins, Joel Peskin, Joshua Ranz
- Trombone – Charles Loper,^{[P]} Alexander Iles, William Reichenbach, Steven Holtman
- Trumpet – Malcolm Mc Nab,^{[P]} David Washburn, Jon Lewis
- Tuba – Doug Tornquist
- Viola – Brian Dembow,^{[P]} Andrew Duckles, Cassandra Richburg, Darrin Mc Cann, David Walther, Keith Greene, Luke Maurer, Matthew Funes, Robert Brophy, Roland Kato, Samuel Formicola, Victoria Miskolczy
- Violin – Roger Wilkie,^{[P2]} Julie Ann Gigante,^{[C]} Amy Hershberger, Anatoly Rosinsky, Armen Anassian, Bruce Dukov, Eun-Mee Ahn, Franklyn D'Antonio, Helen Nightengale, Jacqueline Brand, Jeanne Skrocki, Joel Pargman, Josefina Vergara, Kevin Connolly, Lisa Sutton, Lorand Lokuszta, Maia Jasper, Mario De Leon, Mark Robertson, Miwako Watanabe, Nina Evtuhov, Phillip Levy, Rafael Rishik, Roberto Cani, Eugene Samuel Fischer, Sarah Thornblade, Searmi Park, Serena Mc Kinney, Shalini Vijayan, Songa Lee, Susan Rishik, Tamara Hatwan, Tereza Stanislav

Choir

- Vocal contractor – Rick Logan
- Chorus – Alvin Chea, Amick Byram, Antonio Sol, Bob Joyce, Bobbi Page, Brian Brigham, Clydene Jackson, Debbie Hall Gleason, Edie Lehmann Boddicker, Gerald White, Jennifer Graham, John West, Jon Joyce, Luana Jackman, Rick Logan, Sandie Hall, Susan Stevens Logan, Walt Harrah

Notes

- ^{^[P]} Principal
- ^{^[P2]} Principal 2nd
- ^{^[C]} Concertmaster

== Accolades ==
Awards	Category	Recipient(s) and nominee(s)	Result	Ref.
ASCAP Film and Television Music Awards	Top Box Office Films	Alan Silvestri	Won	
