= Mammoth (TV series) =

BBC television comedy series

- Genre: Sitcom
- Created by: Mike Bubbins
- Written by: Mike Bubbins; Paul Doolan (s1+); Luke Mason (s2)
- Starring: Mike Bubbins; Sian Gibson; Joseph Marcell; Mali Ann Rees
- Theme music composer: Mike Post
- Country of origin: United Kingdom
- Original language: English
- No. of seasons: 2
- No. of episodes: 7

Production
- Executive producers: Steven Canny; Josh Cole; Seb Barwell; Paul Forde
- Producer: Luke Mason
- Production locations: Cardiff, Wales
- Running time: 29 minutes
- Production company: BBC Studios Productions

Original release
- Network: BBC Two
- Release: 21 May 2021 – present

Mammoth is a British sitcom, created and written by Mike Bubbins. Bubbins gave up his teaching job to pursue a career in comedy and portrays PE teacher Tony Mammoth.

The pilot episode was released on 5 November 2021, one of six trial shows commissioned by BBC Wales. Three further episodes were announced as a joint production by BBC Wales and BBC Studios in 2023.

The first episode premiered on BBC Two on 17 April 2024, along with the full series on BBC iPlayer. A second series was commissioned in May 2024, with filming taking place across four weeks in June and July 2025. It launched on 1 December 2025. A third series was confirmed in May 2026.

In September 2026, an American version of the show was sent straight-to-series order by Fox Television, with the first season due to air in 2027.

== Concept ==
Welsh P.E. teacher Tony Mammoth is leading a school skiing trip on New Year's Eve, 1979, when he is trapped by an avalanche. Perfectly preserved, he is recovered and brought back to life on New Year's Day, 2024. After his initial period of fame ends, Mammoth - technically a man in his nineties, but with a body of a man in his forties - returns to his job at the school.

Bubbins was conscious on the pitfalls of shifting a character into the 2020s. He told Morning Live: "It's a fish out of water and you're treading a tightrope. I said, 'Let's make sure that Mammoth does the wrong things for the right reasons'."

== Production ==
=== Development ===
In 2024, creator Bubbins told comedy website Beyond The Joke that Mammoth was an idea he had "around ten or twelve years ago". He later elaborated, telling Rob Brydon:

I had those teachers [like Tony Mammoth] in my life growing up. I loved Buck Rogers. Sci-fi stuff like Blake's 7 and Logan's Run. But Buck Rogers stuck in my mind. He's frozen in his space shuttle and brought back to life in the far future. I wanted a way to portray a decade I love in a modern context. How can I get him [Tony Mammoth] into the present day.

Following the 2021 pilot, three more episodes were ordered as a joint project between BBC Wales and BBC Studios. Paul Forde, commissioning editor for comedy with BBC Wales, said: "It’s a great premise for a show and we know that audiences will love watching Tony Mammoth struggling to come to terms with his predicament."

Paul Doolan joined Bubbins for the full series, with Bubbins saying Doolan does much of the actual writing.

I did the pilot on my own but I'm more of a procrastinator. More of an ideas man. Paul came on board, who's written a lot of stuff. He loves the stuff I don't. He’ll go away and write 25 pages. I joke that he's my typist but it's a lovely relationship.

In May 2024, following the broadcast of the first three episodes, it was announced at the BBC Comedy Festival that the show had been recommissioned. Bubbins said: "They [the BBC] sort of half believed in me. Gave me half of a run. Gave me three eps for the first series. But the reviews were very good and the ratings were very good - so they gave us nine for the second series, with a Christmas special."

The commission was split into two, with three episodes and a Christmas special airing in December 2025. Those four were filmed in Cardiff between 23 June and 20 July 2025.

The third series started filming on 22 June 2026, which coincided with a heatwave across the UK, including the hottest June day on record.

=== Cast and characters ===
With the concept of Tony Mammoth being a character with 1970s sensibilities living in the 2020s, Bubbins was conscious of potentially negative aspects within the casting.

Some 70s sitcom characters like Alf Garnett are purportedly laughing at racists and sexists. The thing is, a lot of racists and sexists love that character. The first thing we did was to make Mammoth’s best friend black – although it’s never referenced – to get rid of that horrible bit of the 70s

That led to the casting of Joseph Marcell. Following the pilot, Sian Gibson was added to the cast as Mel Jones, "the mother of one of [Mammoth's] pupils". She said: "This is a comedy, but its also got plenty of heart with family and friendship at its core. Mike is a joy to work with on set, he is so generous and kind and really pulled the cast together." Meanwhile, Mali Ann Rees was re-cast as Mammoth's fellow teacher, Lucy Manford, although renamed 'Mansford' following the pilot. She said: "I really enjoy working with Mike, he’s been working on this for many years so seeing his vision come into fruition has been very inspiring."

A pair of new cast members were announced for series two: Al Roberts as Mel’s new love interest, Michael - and Dylan Malyn as Nathan, Mel’s nephew and new boss.

Actor	Character	Pilot	Series 1	Series 2
Mike Bubbins	Tony Mammoth	Yes	Yes	Yes
Sian Gibson	Mel Jones	No	Yes	Yes
Joel Davison	Theo	No	Yes	Yes
Joseph Marcell	Roger Buck	Yes	Yes	Yes
Mali Ann Rees	Lucy Mansford	Yes	Yes	Yes
John Weldon	Peter Cowley	No	Yes	Yes
Darryl Mundoma	Liberty Curtis	Yes	No	No
Caitlin Richards	Claire Deering	Yes	No	No
William Thomas	Barry	No	Yes	No
Al Roberts	Michael	No	No	Yes
Dylan Malyn	Nathan	No	No	Yes
Harry Whaley	Dean	No	Yes	No
Siôn Alun Davies	Carl Evans	No	Yes	Yes

=== Theme ===
Mammoth's opening title song was created by television composing veteran Mike Post, who was responsible for other shows such as The Rockford Files, Law & Order and The A-Team. Bubbins told Chortle: "I interviewed the king of theme tunes, Mike Post, for a BBC Wales radio show, and we hit it off. He told me to get in touch if the TV show I was writing ever got commissioned. So I did."

Each episode has a different closing song.

Episode	Artist	Song	Year of release
Pilot	Gerry Rafferty	Get It Right Next Time	1979
Series One, Episode One	Chic	Le Freak	1978
Series One, Episode Two	Average White Band	Pick Up The Pieces	1974
Series One, Episode Three	Carly Simon	You're So Vain	1972
Series Two, Episode One	Status Quo	Down Down	1974
Series Two, Episode Two	Bonnie Tyler	It's A Heartache	1977
Series Two, Episode Three	The First Class	Beach Baby	1974
Series Two, Episode Four	Showaddywaddy	Hey Mister Christmas	1974

== Episodes ==
Series	Episodes	Originally released
Pilot		5 November 2021
1	3	7 April 2024
2	4	1 December 2025

=== Pilot (2021) ===
No. overall	Title	Directed by	Written by	BBC iPlayer Release	Main broadcast
0	"Pilot"	Adam Miller	Mike Bubbins	5 November 2021	5 November 2021
Tony Mammoth struggles to fit back into life teaching at his old school, having been engulfed by an avalanche 42 years in the past.

=== Series 1 (2024) ===
No. overall	No. in series	Title	Directed by	Written by	BBC iPlayer Release	Main broadcast
1	1	"Episode 1"	Simon Hynd	Mike Bubbins & Paul Doolan	17 April 2024	17 May 2024
Tony Mammoth has been found perfectly preserved in the Alps, 45 years after going missing. Following a period of initial fame, he returns to his job as a PE teacher. Despite confusion surrounding his new boss, he is looking forward to parents' evening.
2	2	"Episode 2"	Simon Hynd	Mike Bubbins & Paul Doolan	17 April 2024	24 May 2024
After the revelation at the end of episode one, Mammoth is determined to spend more time with family. Unfortunately, that family isn't so keen on him. That is especially the case when he encourages Theo to stand up for himself.
3	3	"Episode 3"	Simon Hynd	Mike Bubbins & Paul Doolan	17 April 2024	1 May 2024
Following the death of pub landlord and old mate, Barry, Mammoth has a few ideas of where to spread the ashes. That's if he has enough time, because, with the help of Lucy, he also decides to give online dating a try.

=== Series 2 (2025) ===
With the gap between series, the second run of Mammoth featured a voiceover for the title sequence. This was provided by British radio presenter Tony Blackburn, and completed in a single take.

No. overall	No. in series	Title	Directed by	Written by	BBC iPlayer Release	Main broadcast
4	1	"Episode 1"	Akaash Meeda	Mike Bubbins, Paul Doolan & Luke Mason	1 December 2025	1 December 2025
After suffering a panic attack, Mammoth joins a gym and crosses paths with an old nemesis. Meanwhile, Theo gets a job as a lifeguard and, after taking Mammoth's advice, Mel tries to become more assertive at her job.
5	2	"Episode 2"	Akaash Meeda	Mike Bubbins & Paul Doolan	1 December 2025	8 December 2025
Theo gains notoriety after a fire forces him and his mum to move in with Mammoth. This brings Mel's new boyfriend, Matthew, into Tony's life - although it's unclear who has the bigger crush on this newcomer.
6	3	"Episode 3"	Akaash Meeda	Mike Bubbins & Paul Doolan	1 December 2025	15 December 2025
Frustrated after a new headteacher joins Mammoth’s school, Tony sets about convincing Mr Cowley to return. Meanwhile, Mel marks Theo’s 18th birthday by taking him to a hedge maze.
7	4	"Christmas Special"	Akaash Meeda	Mike Bubbins, Paul Doolan & Luke Mason	22 December 2025	22 December 2025
Tony is suspended from school after hijacking the school's Christmas play, leaving him to take a job as Santa Claus. Meanwhile, Mel goes to work in a soup kitchen, as Theo gets a new girlfriend.

== Reception ==
In March 2025, BBC chairman, Samir Shah called the show "brilliant", while saying he was "proud of our programmes that are successful because they took a risk [...] It was risky to have your hero voicing views that are unacceptable today. But it works hilariously."

=== Series 1 ===
The first series was well-received, with Chortle reviewer Rhys Jon Edwards writing: "Bubbins carries this show with a performance that is genuinely a joy to watch [...] Bubbins may find he has created one of the great all-time sitcom characters."

In The Daily Telegraph, Anita Singh wrote: "At a time when every television comedy seems to be exploring issues, from mental illness, menopause or alcoholism, it’s nice to have a show that offers uncomplicated fun. In The Guardian, Rebecca Nicholson wrote: "Mammoth has plenty of warmth to see it through any potentially choppy waters. Bubbins underplays it in a way that shouldn’t work, but does... there is something about his brashness, delivered in a minor key, that really lifts it." Ed Power, writing for The Irish Times, said: "...Bubbins makes it work through sheer commitment to the idea that few things are funnier than a middle-aged man cocooned in corduroy swaggering around to groovelicious tunes." Virgin Media named the show as one of the top-20 programmes to watch on BBC iPlayer.

=== Series 2 ===
With the arrival of series two, the Radio Times wrote: "The success of the show rests on the performance of creator/star Bubbins, and in Tony Mammoth, he has created a brilliant sitcom character".

Publication	Reviewer	Rating	Quote	Link
The Daily Telegraph	Anita Singh	4/5 stars	"A lot of fun"	
Irish Independent	Pat Stacey	4/5 stars	"...riotously funny and anchored by the terrific Bubbins"	
The Sunday Telegraph		4/5 stars	"just as funny" as series one thanks to the "largesse" of Bubbins	
The Times	Ben Dowell	3/5 stars	"...occasionally lacks the courage of its convictions and so isn’t quite as side-splittingly funny as it could be"	
The Guardian	Rachel Aroesti	3/5 stars	"At the heart of Mammoth is a very satisfying joke, but by the end of this second series it has started to wear a little thin"	
Chortle	Steve Bennett	3/5 stars	"There’s essentially only one joke to Mammoth, but it’s affectionately explored"	

== Promotion ==
In the run-up to the launch of series two on 1 December 2025, BBC Sounds released a playlist containing the soundtrack. The BBC also placed a large moving banner across Cardiff Central bus station, featuring a dancing Tony Mammoth with a message reading: 'Welcome to Cardiff, capital city of Wales'.

On the night of broadcast itself, Bubbins performed in-character continuity announcements across the evening for BBC One Wales and BBC Two Wales. He introduced The One Show, EastEnders, Only Connect, University Challenge, Civilizations: Rise And Fall - and Mammoth itself.

== Ratings ==
=== Series 1 ===
Episode one was watched by 430,000 people, a 3.9% audience share, according to industry website, Broadcast Now. It added: "Excluding BBC1 and ITV1’s news bulletins, the sitcom attained the biggest audience share across the main channels in its slot." That figure was in line with BBC Two's average for the same slot - and excludes catch-up viewings, plus figures from BBC iPlayer, on which all of series one launched on the same day. Episode two had 421,000 viewers, a 4.3% share, and was described by Broadcast as holding "steady on the opener", just shy of the 460,000 (4.4%) slot average.

A BBC media release said: "The first two episodes of Mammoth have so far seen an average 7-day audience of 1.2M, above the average for BBC Two comedy and with strong performance for Welsh audiences." It became the fourth highest-performing new comedy series across BBC channels for the whole of 2024.

=== Series 2 ===
The first episode of series two launched on BBC Two with a 2.9% share and 310,000 viewers. This was "shy of the 380,000 (4.1%) benchmark", although ahead of Channel 4's Gogglebox repeat and 5's Inside The Force. It was the second highest-rated comedy of the week, behind BBC1's Daddy Issues.

== Accolades ==
Series	Awards	Category	Other nominees	Result	Ref.
One	TV Times Awards 2024	Best Comedy	Changing Ends; Colin From Accounts; Ghosts; Inside No. 9; Mrs Brown's Boys; Not Going Out; The Completely Made-Up Adventures Of Dick Turpin; The Outlaws; Two Doors Down	Nominated	
One	Comedy.co.uk Awards 2024	Best New TV Sitcom	Daddy Issues; Smoggie Queens; The Completely Made-Up Adventures Of Dick Turpin; The Golden Cobra; Things You Should Have Done	Nominated	
One	I Talk Telly Awards 2024	Best New Comedy	Big Mood; Boarders; Daddy Issues; Ludwig; Mr. Bigstuff; Spent; Such Brave Girls; Things You Should Have Done; We Might Regret This	Nominated	

As well as accolades for the show, Bubbins was also nominated as Favourite Actor (Comedy) at the TV Times Awards 2024 for his role as Tony Mammoth.

== American version ==
In March 2025, Bubbins revealed an American version of the show had been proposed.

The paperwork is being done. They don't do a pilot season anymore. You do a long script Bible, a long version of the pitch. You attach big names to it, or names that work. They either commission a series, or they don't.

By February 2026, BBC Studios' production chief, Zai Bennett announced the company was working with Fox Entertainment on a US version of the show. Bubbins said he would love to see Jason Bateman cast in the titular role. In September 2026, the US adaptation was given a straight-to-series order at Fox, with Christopher Lloyd and Danny Zuker serving as showrunners. It set to premiere during the 2027–28 season.
