= The A-Team (soundtrack) =

The A-Team: Original Motion Picture Soundtrack

Film score by Alan Silvestri
- Released: June 21, 2010
- Recorded: 2010
- Studio: Newman Scoring Stage, 20th Century Fox, Los Angeles, California
- Genre: Film score
- Length: 72:28
- Label: Varèse Sarabande; Fox Music
- Producer: Alan Silvestri

Alan Silvestri chronology
A Christmas Carol (2009)	The A-Team (2010)	Captain America: The First Avenger (2011)

The A-Team: Original Motion Picture Soundtrack is the soundtrack to the 2010 film The A-Team directed by Joe Carnahan, based on the 1980s television series of the same name created by Frank Lupo and Stephen J. Cannell. The film's musical score was composed, conducted and orchestrated by Alan Silvestri, performed by the Hollywood Studio Symphony and released on June 21, 2010 through the Varèse Sarabande and Fox Music labels.

== Development ==
On December 1, 2009, it was announced that Alan Silvestri would compose the film score. Silvestri recorded his score with a 90-piece ensemble of the Hollywood Studio Symphony at the Newman Scoring Stage at 20th Century Fox. Silvestri incorporated the theme from the television series composed by Mike Post and Pete Carpenter, besides composing new themes for the film. Dean Parks performed solo guitars in the film score.

== Critical reception ==
Thomas Glorieux of Maintitles wrote: "if they would have thrown away 20 minutes of its boring second part, The A-Team would have humorously killed you fools, even without its classic main theme at the end." James Southall of Movie Wave wrote: "a very, very good album is in here somewhere; sadly that's not what we were given." James Christopher Monger of AllMusic wrote: "while his take on the bloodless vigilantes' shenanigans hardly merits comparison to his work on the Back to the Future trilogy, Silvestri has managed to successfully blend the cheesy, pioneering spirit of Mike Post and Pete Carpenter's iconic A-Team theme with the reverb-drenched, military snare, Hans Zimmer-inspired bravado of modern war/action films." Filmtracks.com wrote: "If only Silvestri's approach had been as enthusiastically memorable, then perhaps a plan for the score truly would have come together." Richard Propes of The Independent Critic was critical of the film's score calling it as "limp and unimaginative".

== Track listing ==
All music is composed by Alan Silvestri, except where indicated.

The A-Team: Original Motion Picture Soundtrack track listing
No.	Title	Length
1.	"Somewhere in Mexico" (Uses original The A-Team Theme composed by Mike Post and Pete Carpenter)	2:12
2.	"Saving Face"	3:32
3.	"Alpha Mike Foxtrot"	4:29
4.	"Welcome to Baghdad"	4:22
5.	"The Plan"	6:11
6.	"Court Martial"	3:09
7.	"Putting the Team Back Together"	3:39
8.	"Flying a Tank"	6:10
9.	"Frankfurt"	4:11
10.	"Retrieving the Plates"	4:09
11.	"Safehouse"	3:50
12.	"Safehouse Aftermath"	4:58
13.	"Shell Game"	2:44
14.	"The Docks (Part 1)"	7:35
15.	"The Docks (Part 2)"	5:47
16.	"I Love It When a Plan Comes Together" (Uses original The A-Team Theme composed by Mike Post and Pete Carpenter)	5:26
Total length:		72:28

== Personnel ==
Credits adapted from liner notes.

- Composer – Alan Silvestri
- Producer – Alan Silvestri, David Bifano
- Music production assistant – James Findlay
- Engineer – Denis St. Amand
- Digital recordist – Adam Olmsted, Larry Mah
- Recordist – Tim Lauber
- Recording and mixing – Dennis Sands
- Mastering– Patricia Sullivan Fourstar
- Music editor – Jeannie Lee Marks, Lisa Jaime
- Supervising music editor – Kenneth Karman
- Music co-ordinator – David Bifano
- Executive producer – Robert Townson

Orchestra

- Performer – The Hollywood Studio Symphony
- Orchestration – Alan Silvestri, John Ashton Thomas
- Conductor – Alan Silvestri
- Contractor – Peter Rotter, Sandy De Crescent
- Concertmaster – Julie Ann Gigante
- Music preparation – JoAnn Kane Music Service
- Stage manager – Greg Dennen, Tom Steel

Instruments

- Bass – Bruce Morgenthaler, Christian Kollgaard, David Parmeter, Drew Dembowski, Edward Meares, Michael Valerio, Nicolas Philippon, Oscar Hidalgo, Richard Feves, Nico Abondolo
- Bassoon – Michael O'Donovan, Rose Corrigan, Kenneth Munday
- Cello – Andrew Shulman, Antony Cooke, Armen Ksajikian, Cecelia Tsan, Christina Soule, Dane Little, David Speltz, Erika Duke-Kirkpatrick, George Kim Scholes, John Walz, Kevan Torfeh, Paula Hochhalter, Steve Erdody, Timothy Landauer, Trevor Handy, Dennis Karmazyn
- Clarinet – Ralph Williams, Stuart Clark, Gary Bovyer
- Flute – David Shostac, Heather Clark, Sarah Weisz, Geraldine Rotella
- Guitar – Weldon Dean Parks, George Doering
- Harp – Katie Kirkpatrick
- Horn – Brian O'Connor, Daniel Kelley, David Everson, David Duke, Jenny Kim, Paul Klintworth, Steven Becknell, James Thatcher
- Oboe – Leslie Reed, Barbara Northcutt, David Weiss
- Percussion – Donald Williams, Gregory Goodall, Peter Limonick, Steven Schaeffer, Alan Estes
- Piano – Randy Kerber
- Trombone – Alexander Iles, William Reichenbach, Steven Holtman, Charles Loper
- Trumpet – Jon Lewis, Warren Luening, Malcolm Mc Nab
- Tuba – Doug Tornquist
- Viola – Alma Fernandez, Andrew Duckles, Darrin Mc Cann, David Walther, Keith Greene, Marlow Fisher, Matthew Funes, Michael Nowak, Robert Brophy, Roland Kato, Shawn Mann, Steven Gordon, Thomas Diener, Victoria Miskolczy, Brian Dembow
- Violin – Aimee Kreston, Amy Hershberger, Ana Landauer, Armen Anassian, Bruce Dukov, Darius Campo, Dimitrie Leivici, Eun-Mee Ahn, Helen Nightengale, Irina Voloshina, Jacqueline Brand, Jay Rosen, Jeanne Skrocki, Katia Popov, Kenneth Yerke, Kevin Connolly, Lisa Sutton, Lorenz Gamma, Maia Jasper, Marc Sazer, Miwako Watanabe, Natalie Leggett, Phillip Levy, Rafael Rishik, Richard Altenbach, Roberto Cani, Sara Parkins, Sarah Thornblade, Searmi Park, Serena Mc Kinney, Shalini Vijayan, Tamara Hatwan, Tereza Stanislav, Alyssa Park, Roger Wilkie
