= Mike Bubbins =

Welsh comedian, writer and actor (born 1972)

- Born: 18 April 1972 (age 54); Barry, Wales
- Education: Barry Boys' Comprehensive, University of Wales Institute
- Notable work: Mammoth (2021–present); The Socially Distant Sports Bar (2020–present); Scrum V Top-5 (2024–present)

Comedy career
- Medium: comedian; actor; writer; radio presenter; podcaster
- Genre: Observational comedy
- Website: mikebubbins.com

Mike Bubbins (born 18 April 1972) is a Welsh comedian and actor. Originally a P.E. teacher, Bubbins co-writes and stars in the BBC sitcom Mammoth. He also co-hosts podcast The Socially Distant Sports Bar; presents Scrum V Top 5 for BBC Wales; and works as a stand-up.

== Early life ==
Bubbins was born in Barry, South Wales, and attended Barry Boys' Comprehensive. He played youth rugby union as a flanker for Cardiff and was selected for Welsh Schools U18s and Wales U19s. He has spoken about not making further progress in the game:

I think professionalism happened five years too late for me. Some of the players I played with and against – Scott Quinnell, Wayne Proctor, Neil Boobyer, Nathan Budgett, Geraint Lewis, Ben Evans – went on to play for Wales. I was a real idiot. I had a short fuse and would say the wrong things to the wrong people.

He lived in Canada for three years, where he played and coached rugby, before returning to Wales to attend the University of Wales Institute as a mature student. Bubbins spent a decade as a physical education teacher, a profession also followed by his mother, before working the UK stand-up circuit. He credits British sitcom The Office as inspiring him into the profession.

== Television ==
=== Mammoth ===
In 2021 Bubbins wrote and starred in a sitcom pilot for BBC Wales, Mammoth, combining his experiences as a P.E. teacher with his love of the 1970s. Three episodes aired on BBC Two in 2024, and the show was commissioned for a second series of eight episodes, plus a Christmas special. Series two launched on 1 December 2025. As part of the promotion for the show, Bubbins performed in-character continuity announcements across the evening for BBC One Wales and BBC Two Wales. He introduced The One Show, EastEnders, Only Connect, University Challenge, Civilizations: Rise And Fall - and Mammoth itself.

In March 2025, BBC chairman Samir Shah described the show as "brilliant". A year later, BBC Studios announced it was working on a US version of the show, with Fox Entertainment. The show was later sent straight-to-series order, with the first season due to air in 2027.

=== Scrum V Top 5 ===
In November 2024, Bubbins' Scrum V Top 5 debuted on BBC Wales. Hosted from the bar in his garden, the show sees former rugby players and sportspeople creating a top-five list. An extended version of each episode is also available as a podcast.

A spin-off, Christmas Top 5, was broadcast in 2025.

| # | Date | Guest | Subject | Ref |
|---|---|---|---|---|
| 1 | 4 Nov 2024 | Sam Warburton | Favourite team-mates | |
| 2 | 11 Nov 2024 | Dan Biggar | Favourite opponents | |
| 3 | 18 Nov 2024 | Baroness Tanni Grey-Thompson | Favourite rugby moments | |
| 4 | 25 Nov 2024 | Gareth Edwards | Players with whom he wished he'd played | |
| 5 | 29 Jan 2025 | Alun Wyn Jones | Favourite Six Nations matches | |
| 6 | 5 Feb 2025 | Jonathan Davies | Favourite individual tries | |
| 7 | 12 Feb 2025 | Steve Speirs | Rugby heroes | |
| 8 | 19 Feb 2025 | Adam Jones | Top-five forwards | |
| 9 | 25 Feb 2025 | Sarra Elgan | Favourite rugby characters | |
| 10 | 5 Mar 2025 | Colin Charvis | Top-five coaches | |
| 11 | 14 Mar 2025 | Will Carling | Top-five Welsh rugby players | |
| 12 | 19 Mar 2025 | Jamie Roberts | Top-five centres | |
| | 21 Dec 2025 | Bryn Terfel | Top-five Christmas songs | |
| | 22 Dec 2025 | Joanna Page | Top-five Christmas TV shows | |
| | 23 Dec 2025 | Sian Gibson | Top-five Christmas films | |
| 13 | 9 Feb 2026 | Gavin Henson | Most admired players | |
| 14 | 16 Feb 2026 | Max Boyce | Top-five outside halves | |
| 15 | 23 Feb 2026 | Jonathan Davies | Llanelli inspirations | |
| 16 | 2 Mar 2026 | Glenn Webbe | Top-five wingers | |
| 17 | 9 Mar 2026 | Nigel Owens | Favourite Five & Six Nations matches | |

=== Acting roles ===
Bubbins has acted in BBC sitcoms, including Warren, where he played Bob; and Josh, in which he made an appearance as driving instructor, Huw. In the BBC Wales sitcom Tourist Trap, Bubbins played Wyn – with Mari Beard as long-suffering wife Charlotte.

He portrayed an exaggerated version of himself in spoof paranormal investigation show, The Unexplainers – based on the radio show of the same name – and Pastor John in the second series of Soft Border Patrol.

Bubbins guested at desk sergeant Tony (renamed Cliff Rickard in series two) in BBC crime mystery series Death Valley, which starred Timothy Spall in the lead role as John Chapel and Gwyneth Keyworth as Janie Mallowan. He also cameoed in comedy pilot Misguided for Channel 4.

=== Presenting and guest appearances ===
Bubbins appeared in episode 12 of Eat Your Heart Out With Nick Helm (2017); series one, episode seven of Jon Richardson: Ultimate Worrier (2018); and in the documentary Rhod Gilbert: Stand Up To Shyness (2019).

In April 2022, Bubbins starred in an episode of Iaith Ar Daith for S4C, in which he learned some Welsh, alongside friend and colleague, Elis James. This led to a viral clip of Bubbins singing Yma o Hyd alongside Dafydd Iwan.

Also in 2022, Bubbins co-presented eight episodes of BT Sports' clip-show, Down The Clubhouse, a spin-off from the Socially Distant Sports Bar podcast.

In 2024, he was a guest on Channel 4's cookery show, Sunday Brunch. He was also a panellist for series 17, episode 8 of Would I Lie to You?, alongside Babatunde Aléshé, Jessica Knappett, and Claudia Winkleman. Bubbins told a story about a schoolboy trip to the Wimbledon Championships, and performed the Ski Sunday theme in the style of Elvis Presley. The appearance came via a recommendation from presenter and author Richard Osman, after the pair worked together on Richard Osman's House Of Games.

In August 2025, Bubbins and his father, Bob, discussed the subject of 'holidays' for episode two of BBC Wales show, Back in the Day. He also guested on Morning Live, alongside Mammoth co-star Sian Gibson in December 2025.

S4C's One In a Million (Un Mewn Miliwn) saw Bubbins attempt to master the Welsh language, as part of the goal to have a million Cymraeg speakers by 2050. Later in 2026, he spent a week in Dictionary Corner on long-running Channel 4 game show, Countdown.

Bubbins has been a contestant on various quiz shows.

| Date | Show | Note | Opponents | Result | Ref. |
|---|---|---|---|---|---|
| 30 Jan to 3 Feb 2023 | Richard Osman's House Of Games | Series 6, week 14 | Kirsten O'Brien; Christine Ohuruogu; Kai Widdrington | Won | |
| 26 Dec 2024 | Celebrity Mastermind | Series 23, episode 3 Subject: James Garner. 20pts | Kriss Akabusi; Nikita Kanda; Lindsey Santoro | Won | |

== Film ==
In May 2026, Bubbins announced he and actor Steve Speirs were working on a sequel to 1978 movie, Grand Slam. He said: "I'm going to write a sequel that is a homage to the original. The option's been paid for."

== Stand-up ==
Bubbins' introduction to stand-up in the mid-2000s came by accident. He told Rob Brydon:

I lucked out. I was mid-thirties before I started comedy and I came to it completely by accident. I was writing a script about an Elvis tribute act – and there was a free scriptwriting course in Cardiff. I turned up on the wrong day. I'm not very organised. It was a stand-up comedy course. They said, "You might as well do the course while you're here". So I did. And thankfully the person leading the course was pretty good, but not brilliant, because I can remember thinking, 'Well if that's paying your bills, I can do that'.

After the course, Bubbins tried stand-up by posting a request on Facebook, which led to his first open mic comedy gig two weeks later. Part of the early material came from his own love of the 1970s, and accompanying wardrobe. A year later, he put on his first show at the Edinburgh Festival.

Bubbins' stand-up special, Retrosexual, was broadcast on BBC Radio Wales in May 2022. It has since been rebroadcast on BBC Radio 4 Extra. Later the same year, Bubbins was a featured stand-up on the third episode of Kiri Pritchard-McLean's BBC show, Live From Barry Island. A full-length stand-up TV special, Throwback, was shown on BBC One Wales in December 2024, following a UK tour of the same show in 2023.

A 2026–27 UK and Ireland tour, Ideasman, was announced in late 2025.

== Podcasting ==
Since March 2020, Bubbins has co-hosted The Socially Distant Sports Bar with sports journalist, Steffan Garrero; and fellow Welsh comedian Elis James. Garrero described the inspiration for the podcast.

I've always wanted to be involved in a project which really gets across what it's like to talk about sport as a real fan. [This is] three friends sitting in a 'pub' telling each other about YouTube clips of sport they've watched, but who frequently get sidetracked by laughing.

The podcast toured theatres with a 12-date tour in 2021, culminating in a homecoming gig at Motorpoint Arena in Cardiff, in February 2023. The first time all three of them had met up in person together was on stage at the first gig of the tour.

Bubbins and John Rutledge – Eggsy from Welsh rap band Goldie Lookin' Chain – also hosts the Demon Seed podcast, which is described as "a 21st century, supernatural investigative comedy like no other."

In September 2025, Bubbins announced he was re-starting an NFL-focused podcast, alongside fellow comedian Tom Parry.

Beginning in 2015, Bubbins has played recurring character, Eli Roberts, on The Beef And Dairy Network. He also guested on episode 35 of The Moon Under Water podcast, with then-host, John Robins.

Bubbins is a two-time guest on Richard Herring's Leicester Square Theatre Podcast. In October 2022, he featured alongside James and Garrero; then, in July 2023, Bubbins was the main guest on episode 449.

In May 2023, Bubbins made national news after an appearance on Parenting Hell with Rob Beckett and Josh Widdicombe, in which he spoke about the abuse he'd received while refereeing children's rugby.

Bubbins has also been on multiple episodes of improvisational comedy podcast, Pappy's, including Pay The Hotel Bill with Joe Lycett in 2016, and Inflate The Airbed, alongside Rosie Jones in 2022.

== Radio ==
In 2013, Bubbins presented and starred in his own BBC Radio Wales show, Mike Bubbins: Day Tripper. Between 2015 and 2018, he co-starred in four series of The Unexplainers with Rutledge. The show subsequently moved to television for a 2019 run, before launching as the Demon Seed podcast spin-off.

He made several appearances as a guest on BBC 5 Live's Fighting Talk and Blood on the Tracks. He has played various characters on Lucy Beaumont's BBC Radio sitcom To Hull And Back; and portrayed Mr. Lazarus in BBC Radio 4 comedy drama Dangerous Visions: Kafka's Metamorphosis.

In the summer of 2021 Bubbins hosted Nothing Beats The 70s on BBC Radio Wales, drawing on his love of the 1970s and asking guests to try to disprove his theory that its music and fashion made it the best decade. As part of the show, Bubbins interviewed American composer Mike Post – who went onto create the theme music for Mammoth.

In October 2024, Bubbins spent a week covering for Eleri Siôn in the 10p.m. to midnight slot on BBC Radio Wales. Shortly after, Bubbins and Sian Lloyd were guests on Ivo Graham's Radio 4 show, Obsessions.

== Recognition ==
Bubbins was nominated as Favourite Actor (Comedy) at the 2024 TV Times Awards for his role as Tony Mammoth in Mammoth. The show was also nominated for Best Comedy at the same awards, plus shortlisted for 2024's best new TV sitcom by Comedy.co.uk.

Alongside James and Garrero, Bubbins won Best Sport And Leisure Podcast for The Socially Distant Sports Bar at the 2020 Pod Bible Awards. The trio also won Best Sports Comedy Podcast at the inaugural Sports Podcast Awards in 2022.

== Philanthropy ==
In 2023, Bubbins plus podcasting colleagues Garrero and James, teamed with Save A Life Cymru to fund cabinets used to house defibrillators. Their podcast, Socially Distant Sports Bar, has also sponsored multiple sporting clubs across Wales, including Cardiff Metropolitan University's Women's Football Team, Cardiff Schools U16s Rugby, Clwb Rygbi Cymry Caerdydd U15s, Cardiff U16s Rugby League, Wales U16 Rugby League, Deaf Barbarians RFC, Cardiff & Vale Schools Football, Ynys Mon Netball, Carmarthen Town FC's Academy teams, Haverfordwest County AFC, Blackwood Bowls Club, and British/Jamaican Olympic bobsleigh athlete, Mica Moore.

Bubbins has been a patron of Tenovus Cancer Care since 2022.
