= The Reluctant Landlord =

British comedy television series

- Genre: Sitcom
- Created by: Romesh Ranganathan
- Written by: Romesh Ranganathan; Will Smith; Steve Stamp; Shaun Pye; Susan Wokoma; Mark Boutros; Phil Bowker
- Directed by: David Sant
- Starring: Romesh Ranganathan; Sian Gibson; Nick Helm; Yasmine Akram; Marek Larwood; Steve Edge; Nigel Havers (series 2)
- Country of origin: United Kingdom
- Original language: English
- No. of seasons: 2
- No. of episodes: 13

Production
- Executive producers: Claire Whalley; Jon Mountague; Tilusha Ghelani
- Producer: Jane Bell
- Production locations: Egham, Surrey
- Camera setup: Single-camera
- Running time: 30 minutes
- Production companies: CPL Productions; Ranga Bee Productions; What Larks Productions

Original release
- Network: Sky One
- Release: 30 October 2018 – 23 December 2019

The Reluctant Landlord is a British sitcom created by Romesh Ranganathan. The series stars Romesh Ranganathan, Sian Gibson and Nick Helm. It premiered in the UK on 30 October 2018. A second and final series premiered on 4 September 2019.

== Cast and characters ==
- Romesh Ranganathan as Romesh
- Sian Gibson as Natasha
- Nick Helm as Lemon
- Yasmine Akram as Julie
- Marek Larwood as Lee
- Ceyda Ali as Theresa
- Alexander Molony as Charlie
- Steve Edge as David Foster
- Shaheen Khan as Jayanthi
- Nigel Havers as Dr. Shepherd
- Vicki Pepperdine as Head Teacher
- Aimee-Ffion Edwards as Charlotte
- Phil Davis as Dirty Harry
- Alison Steadman as Debbie
- Tim Key as Tommy

== Filming ==
The series was filmed on location in Egham, Surrey. A real pub called The White Lion was used for the fictitious setting of The Seven Swans.

== Episodes ==
Series	Episodes	Originally released	
Series	Episodes	First released	Last released
1	6	30 October 2018	4 December 2018
2	6	4 September 2019	9 October 2019
2	Special	23 December 2019	

=== Series 1 (2018) ===
No. overall	No. in series	Title	Directed by	Written by	Original release date	UK viewers (Note: Viewers across the first 28 days of broadcast on TV, PC/laptop, tablet or smartphone are counted.)
1	1	"Dirty Harry"	David Sant	Will Smith	30 October 2018	959,000
2	2	"Pants On Fire"	David Sant	Romesh Ranganathan	6 November 2018	602,000
3	3	"Mama's Boy"	David Sant	Romesh Ranganathan	13 November 2018	665,000
4	4	"Mystery Shopper"	David Sant	Will Smith	20 November 2018	586,000
5	5	"I Ain't 'Fraid of No Ghost, Dad"	David Sant	Steve Stamp	27 November 2018	457,000
6	6	"Win, Lose or Brewery"	David Sant	Romesh Ranganathan	4 December 2018	438,000

=== Series 2 (2019) ===
No. overall	No. in series	Title	Directed by	Written by	Original release date	UK viewers
7	1	"Daddy Day Care"	David Sant	Shaun Pye	4 September 2019	339,000
8	2	"Love & Marriage"	David Sant	Shaun Pye and Susan Wokoma	11 September 2019	260,000
9	3	"Love Is in the Air"	David Sant	Romesh Ranganathan	18 September 2019	171,000
10	4	"Couples Amnesty"	David Sant	Mark Boutros	25 September 2019	143,000
11	5	"Dreadlock Jeff"	David Sant	Romesh Ranganathan	2 October 2019	129,000
12	6	"Die Another Day"	David Sant	Phil Bowker	9 October 2019	N/A

=== Christmas Special (2019) ===
No. overall	No. in series	Title	Directed by	Written by	Original release date	UK viewers
13	Special	"Christmas Special"	David Sant	Phil Bowker	23 December 2019	N/A
