= Captain America: The First Avenger (soundtrack) =

Captain America: The First Avenger—Original Motion Picture Soundtrack

Film score by Alan Silvestri
- Released: July 19, 2011
- Recorded: 2011
- Studios: Air Studios, London
- Genre: Film score
- Length: 71:53
- Labels: Buena Vista; Marvel Music
- Producers: Alan Silvestri; David Bifano

Alan Silvestri chronology
The A-Team (2010)	Captain America: The First Avenger—Original Motion Picture Soundtrack (2011)	The Avengers (2012)

Captain America: The First Avenger—Original Motion Picture Soundtrack is the soundtrack album to the Marvel Studios film titled Captain America: The First Avenger, based on the character created by Marvel Comics. The music was composed and conducted by Alan Silvestri and recorded by the Air Studios. Buena Vista Records announced the details for the soundtrack in June 2011 and released it on July 19 in the United States.

== Track listing ==
All music is composed by Alan Silvestri, except where indicated.

No.	Title	Lyrics	Music	Length
1.	"Captain America Main Titles"			0:56
2.	"Frozen Wasteland"			1:53
3.	"Schmidt's Treasure"			3:01
4.	"Farewell to Bucky"			2:50
5.	"Hydra Lab"			1:54
6.	"Training the Supersoldier"			1:08
7.	"Schmidt's Story"			1:59
8.	"VitaRays"			4:25
9.	"Captain America "We Did It""			1:59
10.	"Kruger Chase"			2:55
11.	"Hostage On the Pier"			2:46
12.	"General's Resign"			2:18
13.	"Unauthorized Night Flight"			3:13
14.	"Troop Liberation"			5:06
15.	"Factory Inferno"			5:06
16.	"Triumphant Return"			2:16
17.	"Howling Commando's Montage"			2:16
18.	"Hydra Train"			3:27
19.	"Rain Fire Upon Them"			1:39
20.	"Motorcycle Mayhem"			3:05
21.	"Invasion"			5:09
22.	"Fight on the Flight Deck"			3:30
23.	"This is My Choice"			3:26
24.	"Passage of Time"			1:35
25.	"Captain America"			1:08
26.	"Star Spangled Man"	David Zippel	Alan Menken	2:53
27.	"Captain America March"			2:36
Total length:				71:53

Note: "Captain America March" was only released as a download bonus track and is not included on the physical CD. A 1940s style big band rendition of "Make Way for Tomorrow Today" from Iron Man 2 was arranged by Alan Silvestri, befitting the time period, is heard in the film, but is not included in the soundtrack, and would later be used in the ending credits of Avengers: Endgame.

== Production ==
In June 2011, Buena Vista Records announced the details for the soundtrack release of Captain America: The First Avenger. The album includes the original score by Alan Silvestri, as well as the original song "Star Spangled Man" with music by Alan Menken and lyrics by David Zippel. The soundtrack was recorded at Air Studios in London and was released on July 19, 2011.

== Reception ==
Professional ratings
Review scores
Source	Rating
AllMusic	3.5/5 stars
Filmtracks	4/5 stars
Movie Music UK	4.5/5 stars
Movie Wave	4/5 stars

The score received a positive response from critics. James Southall of Movie-Wave.net commented, "for those of us tearing our hair out in despair at the ludicrously dumb approach to scoring [Marvel's] films since Iron Man, we might be able to hold off on needing hair implants for a little while longer – this is precisely the old-school symphonic score with a big theme that we've been waiting for."

Jonathan Broxton of Movie Music UK stated, "Captain America is one of the most enjoyable scores of the summer for one single reason – it's fun. There's nothing pretentious about it, nothing hidden, no deeper meanings. Much like the film it accompanies it wears its heart on its sleeve and has a simple intent: to excite you, entertain you, and leave the experience smiling. Sometimes you just need a score like that, filled with basic pleasures, and Silvestri's work here succeeds on that mark with aplomb."

A review in Allmusic commented, "Appropriately stoic and expansive, the main theme for Captain America: The First Avenger feels both familiar and iconic, arriving early in the soundtrack (as all good superhero themes must) on a foundation of rolling military snares, sepia-toned brass, and long strings that evoke an endless sea of amber waves of grain. It's enjoyable and effective, but not groundbreaking, which pretty much sums up the score as a whole. Bombastic, melodramatic, and steeped in late-'70s/early-'80s big-budget adventure cinema, the Captain is well served here, even if it all feels a little old-fashioned at times. That said, it is awfully nice to hear a well-conducted orchestra, as opposed to a room full of expensive computers and keyboards, churn out a big traditional action score, and few do that as well as Silvestri."

== Charts ==
Weekly chart performance for Captain America: The First Avenger—Original Motion Picture Soundtrack
Chart (2011)	Peak position
UK Soundtrack Albums (OCC)	16
