= The Power of Parker =

British television comedy series

- Promotional image showing the main characters. Diane & Martin Parker and Kath
- Genre: Sitcom
- Created by: Paul Coleman; Sian Gibson
- Written by: Paul Coleman; Sian Gibson
- Directed by: Joseph Roberts; Andrew Chaplin
- Starring: Conleth Hill; Sian Gibson; Rosie Cavaliero; George Costigan; Sheila Reid
- Country of origin: United Kingdom
- Original language: English
- No. of series: 2
- No. of episodes: 12

Production
- Executive producers: Paul Coleman; Kate Daughton; Sian Gibson; Tanya Quereshi
- Producer: Gill Isles
- Running time: 29 minutes
- Production companies: Boffola; Lookout Point

Original release
- Network: BBC One
- Release: 28 July 2023 – 4 July 2025

The Power of Parker is a British television sitcom created and written by Sian Gibson and Paul Coleman. It stars Conleth Hill as businessman Martin Parker in Stockport in 1990, trying to juggle his debts, his wife, and his mistress. Gibson also stars, along with Rosie Cavaliero. The first series was released on BBC One on 28 July 2023. The second series aired weekly on BBC One from 30 May 2025, with all six episodes released the same day on BBC iPlayer. It was cancelled after 2 series.

== Synopsis ==
In Stockport, 1990, Martin Parker (Hill) has a complicated life with personal issues and business debts but things could get worse if his mistress Kath (Gibson) and wife Diane (Cavaliero) team up to bring him down.

== Cast ==
- Conleth Hill as Martin Parker
- Sian Gibson as Kath Pennington
- Sheila Reid as Gladys
- Rosie Cavaliero as Diane Parker (née Pennington)
- Steve Pemberton as Sandy
- George Costigan as Dougie Pennington
- Rhiannon Clements as Bev
- Austin Haynes as Ryan Slater

== Production ==
The series is written by Paul Coleman and Sian Gibson. Coleman came up with the idea and asked Gibson to write with him. It is set in Stockport, near Manchester, in 1990. Gibson was in Manchester as a student in the 1990s. Cavaliero also studied in Manchester. Lead actor Hill was also in Manchester in 1990, filming the TV show Medics. Gibson has described the series as a “suburban Fatal Attraction. The show was commissioned in 2022 under the title Undoing Martin Parker and was filmed in Stockport in early 2023.

== Broadcast ==
The first series aired on 28 July 2023 on BBC One and BBC iPlayer.

The second series first aired on 30 May 2025 on BBC One and BBC iPlayer.

== Episodes ==
=== Series 1 (2023) ===
No. overall	No. in series	Title	Directed by	BBC iPlayer release date	BBC One broadcast
1	1	"Two Soaps and a Talc"	Andrew Chaplin	28 July 2023	28 July 2023
2	2	"Miss Stockport"	Joe Roberts	28 July 2023	4 August 2023
3	3	"A Dark Horse"	Joe Roberts	28 July 2023	11 August 2023
4	4	"No Words Are Spoken"	Joe Roberts	28 July 2023	18 August 2023
5	5	"White Goods"	Joe Roberts	28 July 2023	25 August 2023
6	6	"Dynamite"	Joe Roberts	28 July 2023	1 September 2023

=== Series 2 (2025) ===
No. overall	No. in series	Title	Directed by	BBC iPlayer release date	BBC One broadcast
7	1	"Out On the Razz"	Joseph Roberts	30 May 2025	30 May 2025
8	2	"Muck for Luck"	Joseph Roberts	30 May 2025	6 June 2025
9	3	"Just a Blip"	Joseph Roberts	30 May 2025	13 June 2025
10	4	"Thirsty Girl"	Joseph Roberts	30 May 2025	20 June 2025
11	5	"Trust the Process"	Joseph Roberts	30 May 2025	27 June 2025
12	6	"You Better Not Miss"	Joseph Roberts	30 May 2025	4 July 2025

== Reception ==
Lucy Mangan in The Guardian wrote: "this comedy-drama wishes it was a Victoria Wood show". Rachel Cooke in the New Statesman described it as “comic perfection”, but that with its 1990 setting and jokes about “Anneka Rice and Juliet Bravo”, it may be “only half comprehensible to anyone under 45”. The Newspaper i described how the show’s “costume designers have had a ball with some truly horribly 1990s fashions.”

== Awards ==
Series	Awards	Category	Other nominees	Result	Ref.
One	RTS North West Awards 2024	Best Comedy Programme	Brassic: Series 5; G'wed; Inside No.9: Series 9	Won	
One	Comedy.co.uk Awards 2023	Best New TV Sitcom	Queen Of Oz; Black Ops; Everyone Else Burns; Such Brave Girls; The Change	Nominated	
