= Tim Reid (comedy writer) =

British screenwriter

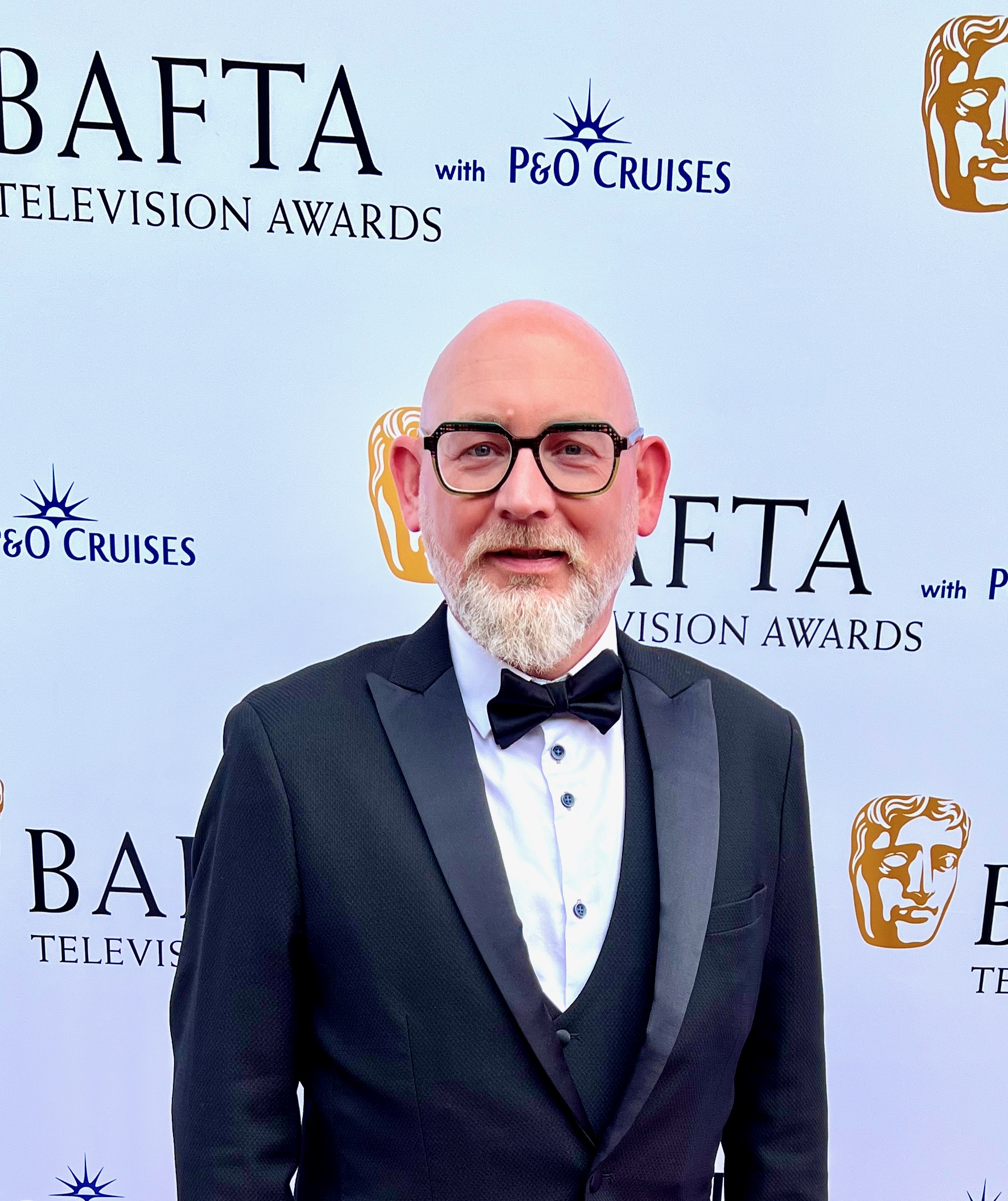
- Reid in 2023
- Born: Solihull, United Kingdom
- Education: Solihull School
- Occupation: Comedy writer
- Writing career
- Genre: Comedy
- Notable works: Peter Kay's Car Share; Meet the Richardsons

Tim Reid is a British TV comedy writer. He is known for co-writing and co-creating the BBC One sitcom Peter Kay's Car Share and UKTV's Meet the Richardsons, starring comedians Jon Richardson and Lucy Beaumont.

== Early life and education ==
Reid grew up in Solihull and attended Solihull School.

== Career ==
Reid started his career working for advertising agencies before specialising in innovation around 2006. He was working as a business consultant for an innovation company when he began writing comedy with colleague Paul Coleman.

After writing a script for a sitcom called Car Share, they sent it to Peter Kay, who Coleman had previously worked with, for feedback; Kay in turn pitched the sitcom to the BBC. "We were just hoping he would give us some feedback and opinions - whether it was a good idea or not and whether the writing was good enough [...] It was a real thrill when he came back and said not only did he really like it but wanted to get involved too," said Reid.

The series premiered on BBC iPlayer in 2015 with Kay in the lead role, becoming the first programme to be released on iPlayer before being broadcast on BBC One. The series drew a peak audience of 9.4 million viewers for the first episode of its second series.

In 2016 Reid and the Car Share writing team won 'Best Comedy Writing on Television' at the British Screenwriters' Awards. The Car Share writing team were also nominated for 'Best Writer - Comedy' at the 2016 British Academy Television Craft Awards and the 2016 Royal Television Society Awards.

In 2017 he was credited as a writer on The Nightly Show.

Reid co-wrote Meet the Richardsons, which follows the fictionalised life of comedians Jon Richardson and Lucy Beaumont, initially running on UKTV and renewed for a second series in 2020; the series was later shown on BBC Two. Reid also starred as himself in the show as part of a meta plot point where he was co-writing a fictional show with Beaumont. Meet the Richardsons won 'Best Comedy Programme' for 2021 and 2022 at the Broadcast Digital Awards.

He has also served as an innovation consultant for brands including Carling and Durex and is a keynote speaker on how to inspire creativity and innovation.

In 2024, Reid launched the podcast Fist of Firsts, where he interviews comedians about their backstories and creative process.
