= Promotional representative =

Promotional representatives, also known as promo reps, are people who are hired to promote a brand, product, or service. They are generally hired by event marketing agencies, staffing agencies, and companies choosing to promote their products, services, and brands through the use of live events, mobile tours, and guerrilla marketing instead of television, radio, and print advertising.

Promotional products, also known as ad specialties, make up a 19.4 billion dollar industry and are used by virtually every business in the United States. These include items like mugs, T-shirts, and pens, designed to be memorable with a low cost per impression.

== Role ==
Promotional representatives persuade customers to use sales promotional advertising items of the wholesale commodity distributor. They visit retail establishments, for example department stores, pubs, supermarkets, and clubs to persuade customers to use advertising items and promote the sale of company products. They deliver promotional items, such as posters, glasses, napkins, and product samples, and arrange for the display of items in the seller's establishment. They may also take sales orders from customers.

== See also ==
- Brand ambassador
