= Mike Post =

American composer and record producer

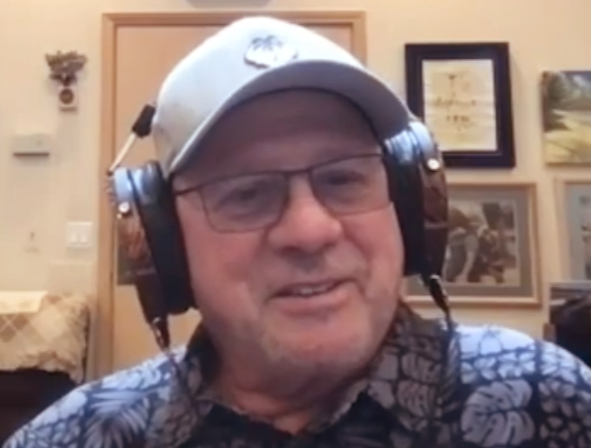
- Post in a 2024 interview

Background information
- Born: Leland Michael Postil; September 29, 1944 (age 82); Berkeley, California, U.S.
- Origin: Los Angeles, California, U.S.
- Genres: Rock; pop; soul; theme music
- Occupations: Producer; songwriter; musician; composer; arranger
- Instruments: Vocals; guitar; bass guitar; keyboards; piano
- Years active: 1964–present
- Website: mike-post.com

Mike Post (born Leland Michael Postil; September 29, 1944) is an American composer. He is best known for his television theme music for various shows, including Law & Order and its spin-offs Special Victims Unit and Criminal Intent, and also The A-Team, Hill Street Blues, Hunter, Magnum, P.I., NYPD Blue, Quantum Leap, L.A. Law, The Rockford Files and Mammoth. He is a Primetime Emmy Award and a five-time Grammy Award winner.

== Early life and musical career ==
Born and raised in Berkeley, California, Post's first credited work in music was cutting demos using two singing sisters, Terry and Carol Fischer. With Sally Gordon, they went on to become The Murmaids. Their first single, "Popsicles and Icicles" (written by David Gates), was a number 3 hit song in January 1964.

Post also provided early guidance for the garage rock band The Outcasts while in recruit training in San Antonio, Texas. He was the songwriter and producer for both songs on the band's first single, released in 1965, and also arranged a local concert where they served as the back-up band.

He won his first of five Grammy Awards at age 23 for Best Instrumental Arrangement on Mason Williams' "Classical Gas", a number 2 hit song in 1968. He is also credited as the record producer for Williams' LP that included that song, The Mason Williams Phonograph Record.

Billed as the Mike Post Coalition, their track "Afternoon of the Rhino" became a sought-after Northern soul track. The single peaked at number 47 in the UK Singles Chart in August 1975.

Post also worked with Kenny Rogers and produced the first three albums he recorded with his country/rock group Kenny Rogers and The First Edition (between 1967 and 1969). Post also produced Dolly Parton's hit album 9 to 5 and Odd Jobs in 1981. In 1997, he produced Van Halen's Van Halen III album.

== Television theme music ==
One of his first jobs in television started when he was 24, as the musical director on The Andy Williams Show. Another early job was writing the theme music for the short-lived detective series Toma in 1973, but his big breakthrough (together with co-composer Pete Carpenter) came in the following year with his theme song for The Rockford Files, another series by producer Stephen J. Cannell. The theme also got cross-over Top 40 radio airplay and earned a second Grammy for Post.

The Rockford Files theme became a Top 10 hit in both the U.S. (number 10) and Canada (number 8). It ranks as the 85th biggest U.S. hit of 1975, and the 84th biggest Canadian hit of 1975.

Post subsequently won Grammys for Best Instrumental Composition for the themes of the television shows Hill Street Blues in 1981 and L.A. Law in 1988 as well as another Grammy in 1981 for Best Instrumental Performance for the Hill Street Blues theme, which also reached number 10 in the U.S.

The Law & Order "clang"

Post won an Emmy for his Murder One theme music, and had previously been nominated for NYPD Blue, among others. He has won Broadcast Music, Inc. Awards for the music for L.A. Law, Hunter, and the various Law & Order series. The theme for The Greatest American Hero (co-written with Stephen Geyer) is one of the few television themes to reach as high as number 2 as a single record on the Billboard Hot 100. The "dun, dun" sound effect he created for the Law & Order franchise has entered popular culture and he has written variations on it for each new series.

At the peak of his career, Post was the go-to composer for all of the series created by Donald P. Bellisario, Steven Bochco, Stephen J. Cannell and Dick Wolf. Due to the considerable amount of music to be created, Post operated an office with multiple staff composers, among them Walter Murphy, Velton Ray Bunch, Frank Denson, Jerry Grant and Greg Edmonson, all composing side by side in cubicles. Each would write music cues to complement specific scenes from each show in Post's signature style.

Other TV music works include The A-Team; Baa Baa Black Sheep; Blossom; The Commish; Doogie Howser, M.D.; The Greatest American Hero; Hardcastle and McCormick; Hooperman; Hunter; Magnum, P.I.; NewsRadio; Profit; Quantum Leap; Renegade; Riptide; Silk Stalkings; Stingray; Tales of the Gold Monkey; Tenspeed and Brown Shoe; The White Shadow; Wiseguy; the BBC series Roughnecks; and Philly.

In 1994, Post scored the Diagnosis: Murder episode "How To Murder Your Lawyer", designed as a backdoor pilot for a lawyer series.

In 2014, Post composed the score for the fake TV pilot Caged Heat in the All Hail the King short film for Marvel Studios.

In 2024, Post composed the theme music for BBC2 sitcom Mammoth, having initially met show creator Mike Bubbins when being interviewed on a BBC Radio Wales show.

== Inventions from the Blue Line ==
In 1994, Post released a CD, called Inventions from the Blue Line. The CD contained several of his well-known themes, featuring NYPD Blue and also including Law & Order, Silk Stalkings and Renegade. In the liner notes, he discussed his late father, Sam Postil, and the admiration for law enforcement officers that Sam instilled in Mike. He also referred to police in the traditional nickname of "blues", as in The Thin Blue Line (referring to the police in general and to police camaraderie). One of the tracks is called "The Blue Line", which Post calls "the comradery theme".

== In popular culture ==
The Pete Townshend song "Mike Post Theme", which alludes to the ubiquity of Post's work in television theme music, appears on The Who's 2006 album, Endless Wire.

== BMI Foundation: The Pete Carpenter Fellowship ==
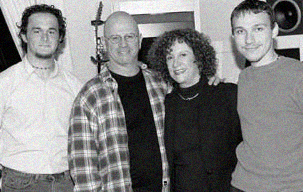
David LaChance, Mike Post, BMI's Linda Livingston and Universal Music Group producer/writer Svoy

In 1989, Broadcast Music, Inc. Foundation and Mike Post established The Pete Carpenter Fellowship in memory of the late Pete Carpenter, who was Post’s co-composer of television scores and themes including The Rockford Files (for which they won a Grammy), Hunter, Riptide, Hardcastle and McCormick, Magnum, P.I. and The A-Team. The Pete Carpenter Fellowship is an annual, competitive residency for aspiring television, film and video game composers.

== Discography ==
=== Albums ===
- 1969: Fused (as The Mike Post Coalition); Warner Bros.-Seven Arts (LP)
- 1975: Railhead Overture; MGM (LP)
- 1982: Television Theme Songs; Elektra (LP)
- 1988: Music from L.A. Law and Otherwise; Polydor (LP)
- 1994: Inventions from the Blue Line; American Gramaphone (CD)
- 2024: Message from the Mountains & Echoes of the Delta

=== Charting singles ===
The following singles credited to Mike Post charted on the U.S. Billboard Hot 100 chart and/or on the Adult Contemporary chart:

- "The Rockford Files" (number 10, 1975; AC number 16)
- "Manhattan Spiritual" (number 56, 1975; AC number 28)
- "Theme from The Greatest American Hero (Believe It or Not)" (number 2, 1981; AC number 3)
- "Hill Street Blues" (number 10, 1981; AC number 4)
- "Magnum, P.I." (number 25, 1982; AC number 40)
- "Theme from L.A. Law" (AC number 13, 1988)
