= The Rockford Files (theme) =

Single by Mike Post
- B-side: "Dixie Lullabye"
- Released: May 1975
- Genre: Pop
- Label: MGM Records
- Songwriters: Mike Post, Pete Carpenter
- Producer: Mike Post

Mike Post singles chronology
"The Rockford Files" (1975)	"Manhattan Spiritual" (1975)

Video
- "The Rockford Files" (theme) on YouTube

"The Rockford Files" is a 1975 instrumental by Mike Post and co-composer Pete Carpenter. The song is the theme from the American detective drama TV series The Rockford Files, starring James Garner. It appears at the opening and ending of each episode with different arrangements. Throughout the show's tenure, the theme song went through numerous evolutions, with later versions containing a distinct electric guitar bridge section played by session guitarist Dan Ferguson.

The Instrumental features a blues harmonica solo, dobro guitar, an electric guitar solo heard in the bridges, plus a Minimoog synthesizer, heard in the refrains. This was one of the first popular song appearances for the synthesizer.

The song spent four months on the charts and in August 1975 became a Top 10 hit in the U.S. (#10, for two weeks) and in Canada (#8). It was also a Top 20 Adult Contemporary hit in both nations.

"The Rockford Files" won a 1975 Grammy Award for Best Instrumental Arrangement.

The B-side track (or "flip-side"), entitled "Dixie Lullabye", was also composed by Post and Carpenter.

"The Rockford Files" is also the music played when Tranmere Rovers F.C., a professional association football club in Birkenhead, England, enter the pitch for the opening half of a match.

== Personnel ==
- Lead guitar, dobro — Dan Ferguson
- Guitar — Stephen Geyer
- Bass — Lyle Ritz
- Minimoog synthesizer — Mike Post
- Harmonica — Tommy Morgan
- Banjo — Herb Pedersen
- Drums — Jim Gordon
- Percussion — Gary Coleman

== Chart history ==
=== Weekly charts ===
Chart (1975/76)	Peak position
Australia (Kent Music Report)	90
Canadian RPM Top Singles	8
Canadian RPM Adult Contemporary	8
U.S. Billboard Hot 100	10
U.S. Billboard Easy Listening	16
U.S. Cash Box Top 100	10

=== Year-end charts ===
Chart (1975)	Rank
Canada Top Singles	84
U.S. Billboard Hot 100	85
