= G.I. Joe: The Rise of Cobra (soundtrack) =

G.I. Joe: The Rise of Cobra – Score from the Motion Picture

Film score by Alan Silvestri
- Released: August 4, 2009
- Recorded: Newman Scoring Stage, Twentieth Century Fox Studios, Los Angeles; Barbra Streisand Scoring Stage, Sony Pictures Studios, Culver City
- Genre: Film score
- Length: 71:42
- Label: Varèse Sarabande
- Producer: Alan Silvestri

Alan Silvestri chronology
Night at the Museum: Battle of the Smithsonian (2009)	G.I. Joe: The Rise of Cobra (2009)	A Christmas Carol (2009)

G.I. Joe: The Rise of Cobra – Score from the Motion Picture is the score to the 2009 film G.I. Joe: The Rise of Cobra directed by Stephen Sommers. The film is composed and scored by Alan Silvestri, who reunited with Sommers after The Mummy Returns (2001) and Van Helsing (2004). Silvestri recorded the score with a 90-piece ensemble of the Hollywood Studio Symphony at the Newman Scoring Stage in 20th Century Fox and at the Barbra Streisand Scoring Stage in Sony Pictures Studios, respectively. A soundtrack album of the score was released by Varèse Sarabande on August 3, 2009, four days ahead of the release.

== Reception ==
James Christopher Monger of AllMusic rated 3 out of 5 to the score, saying "Silvestri breaks little ground on G.I Joe, employing enough "orchestral bombast peppered with military marches" to give Michael Bay-puppet Hans Zimmer a run for his money, but if 70 minutes of dependable, by-the-book action music (imagine watching the opening titles for the A-Team for an hour-and-a-half) is the tonic that gets your blood pumping, then G.I. Joe: Rise of Cobra will definitely put hair on (or back on) your chest." Writing for Empire, Danny Graydon also rated the score 3 out of 5, and commented: "To be fair to Silvestri, he handles the job with typical aplomb even if he does plagiarise his Predator score somewhat in Delivering The Warheads and he unquestionably captures the signature bombastic tone. The problem is, none of it feels particularly original and the profusion of electronica seems to devalue Silvestri's well-known and masterful use of a full orchestra. Still, it does exactly what it says on the tin."

Filmtracks.com wrote "Constantly at war in Silvestri's score for G.I. Joe: The Rise of Cobra is the limited thematic development and the overbearing tone of the somewhat generic action material. The mix of the album is extremely heavy in the bass region at times, again emulating Steve Jablonsky's Transformers scores and everything related to them. Some listeners won't be able to hear past the incessant ensemble hits (and their synthetic counterparts) to appreciate Silvestri's two themes for the film. The composer is intensely loyal to both of these themes throughout the score, though with so much ambient noise in the nearly constant slapping and pulsating of the action, casual listeners may miss them."

== Track listing ==
No.	Title	Length
1.	"Clan McCullen"	3:06
2.	"Mars Industries"	1:43
3.	"Delivering The Warheads"	7:24
4.	"General Hawk"	1:36
5.	"It Had To Be NATO's Fault!"	1:40
6.	"King Cobra"	2:59
7.	"What Happened To Her?"	1:17
8.	"I Promise"	2:07
9.	"The Pit Battle"	7:24
10.	"They Intend To Use Them"	1:07
11.	"Snake Eyes"	2:22
12.	"I Have A Target In Mind"	2:23
13.	"The Joe's Mobilize"	8:24
14.	"Northern Route"	6:09
15.	"Who Are You?"	3:35
16.	"Deploy The Sharcs"	7:32
17.	"Final Battle"	0:55
18.	"Just About Close Enough"	3:56
19.	"The Rise Of Cobra"	1:53
20.	"I'm Not Giving Up On You"	1:49
21.	"End Credits"	2:21
Total length:		71:42

== Mastering issues ==
The score came under scrutiny from various soundtrack forums soon after being released. Spectral analysis of the content of the CD revealed certain frequency cutoff patterns around 16 kHz, which are typical for lossy codecs. By analyzing the block size of these cutoffs, individuals at Hydrogenaudio were able to identify the lossy codec that was used before mastering the CD as MP3 with a sample rate of 48 kHz. According to the aforementioned forums, Varèse's German subsidiary Colosseum Schallplatten acknowledged this as a mastering error, while Varèse Sarabande itself denied this. It is so far unclear if a remastered version with full frequency content will be released.

== Personnel ==
Credits adapted from CD liner notes.

Album credits

- Composer - Alan Silvestri
- Producer – Alan Silvestri, David Bifano
- Recording, mixing – Dennis Sands
- Executive producer – Robert Townson
- Orchestration – The Hollywood Studio Symphony
- Concertmaster – Rene Mandel

Performer credits

- Bassoon – Ken Munday, Peter Mandell
- Cello – Andrew Shulman, Armen Ksajikian, David Low, Erika Duke-Kirkpatrick, George Kim Scholes, John Walz, Paul Cohen, Paula Hochhalter, Steve Erdody, Timothy Landauer, Dennis Karmazyn
- Clarinet – Stuart Clark, Gary Bovyer
- Double bass – Nico Abondolo, Bruce Morgenthaler, Christian Kollgaard, Constance Deeter, David Parmeter, Drew D. Dembowski, Edward Meares, Mike Valerio, Oscar Hidalgo, Tim Eckert, Michael O'Donovan
- Flute – Geraldine Rotella, Heather Clark, Jim Walker
- Harp – Marcia Dickstein, Katie Kirkpatrick
- Horn – Brian O'Connor, Daniel P. Kelley, David Duke, Katie Dennis, Mark L. Adams, Paul Klintworth, Richard Todd, Steve Becknell, James Thatcher
- Oboe – Leslie Reed, David Weiss
- Percussion – Daniel Greco, Don Williams, Greg Goodall, Michael Fisher, Peter Limonick, Steve Schaeffer, Wade Culbreath, Alan Estes
- Piano – Randy Kerber, Randy Waldman
- Trombone – Alex Iles, Bill Reichenbach, Steven Holtman, Charles Loper
- Tuba – Doug Tornquist, Gary Hickman
- Viola – Alma Fernandez, Andrew Duckles, Cassandra Richburg, Darrin McCann, David Walther, Luke Maurer, Matt Funes, Robert Brophy, Roland Kato, Sam Formicola, Vicki Miskolczy, Brian Dembow
- Violin – Aimee Kreston, Amy Hershberger, Ana Landauer, Anatoly Rosinsky, Eun-Mee Ahn, Franklyn D'Antonio, Heejin Leem, Helen Nightengale, Jackie Brand, Jeanne Skrocki, Josefina Vergara, Kenneth Yerke, Kevin Connolly, Lisa Sutton, Lorand Lokuszta, Maia Jasper, Mark Robertson, Movses Pogossian, Natalie Leggett, Phillip Levy, Rachel Englander, Radu Pieptea, Rafael Rishik, Richard Altenbach, Roberto Cani, Samuel Fischer, Serena McKinney, Songa Lee, Susan Rishik, Tamara Hatwan, Julie Gigante, Alyssa Park, Armen Anassian, Daniel Lewin, Dimitrie Leivici, Endre Granat, Joel Pargman, Mario DeLeon, Tereza Stanislav
