= List of UK top-ten singles in 2008 =

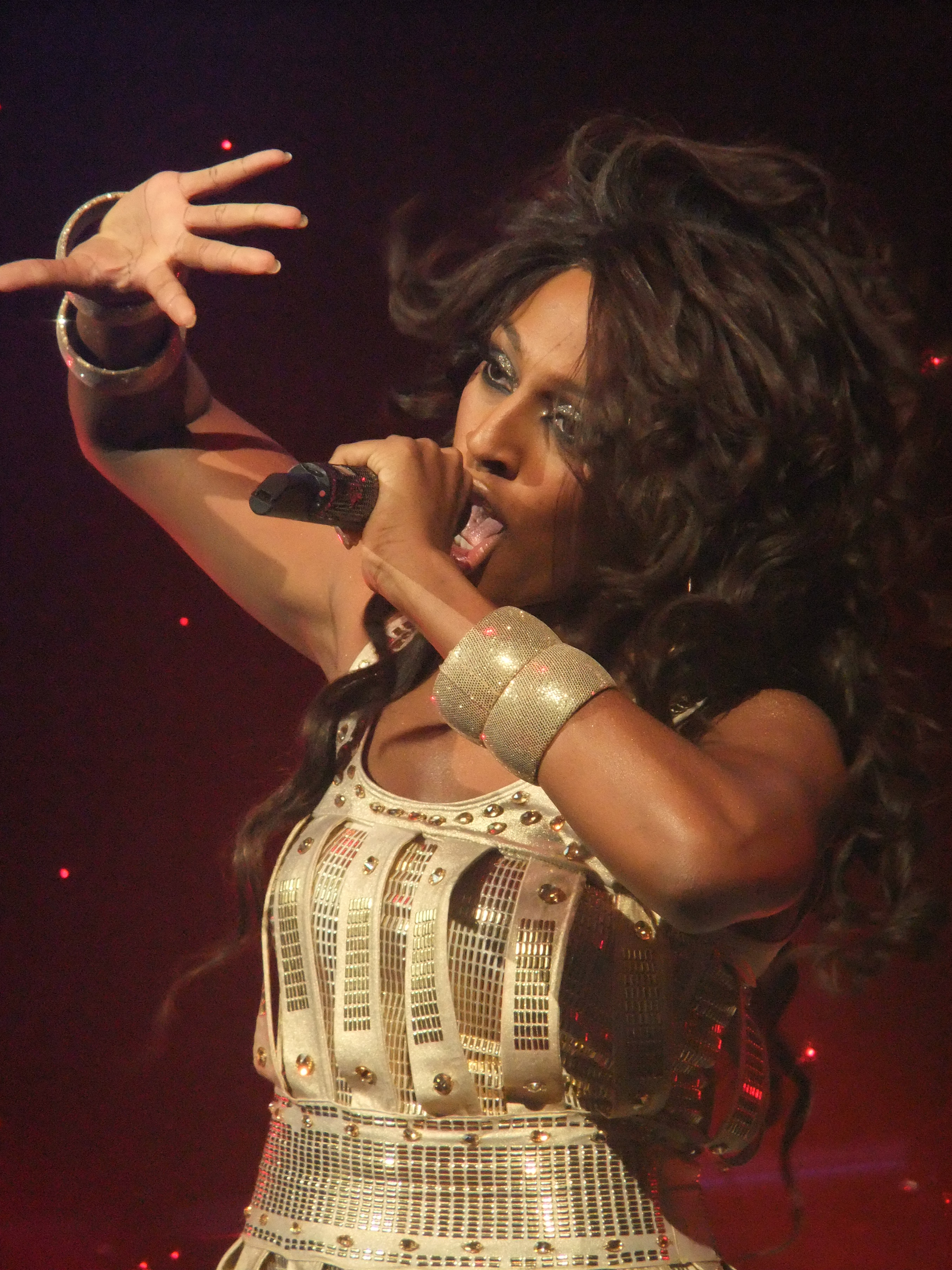
Alexandra Burke achieved the biggest-selling single of 2008 with her X Factor winner's song "Hallelujah", the Christmas number-one for 2008.

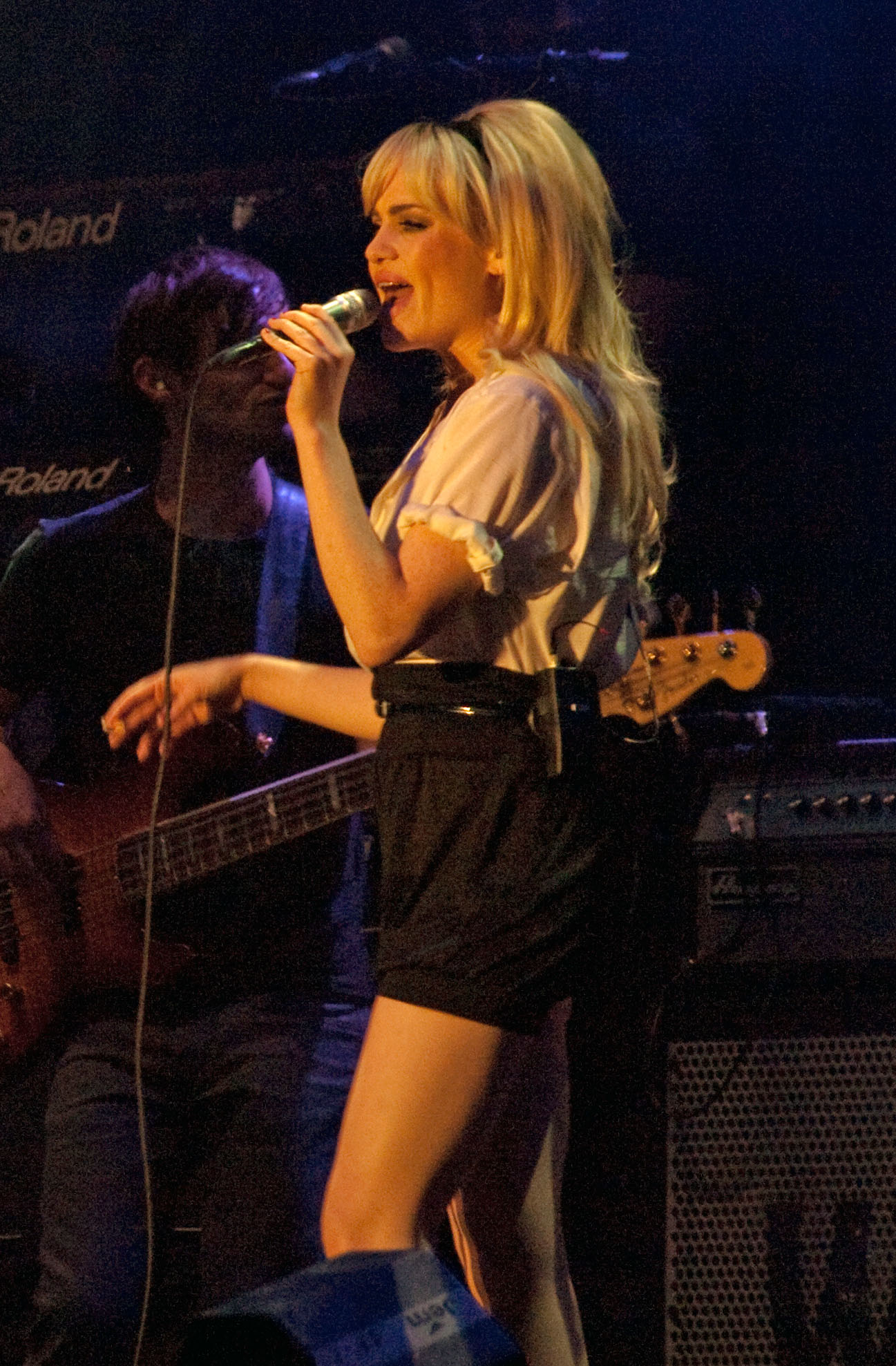
Welsh singer Duffy had her breakthrough this year with two top 10 entries, including "Mercy", which peaked at number-one for five weeks and became the year's third best selling single.

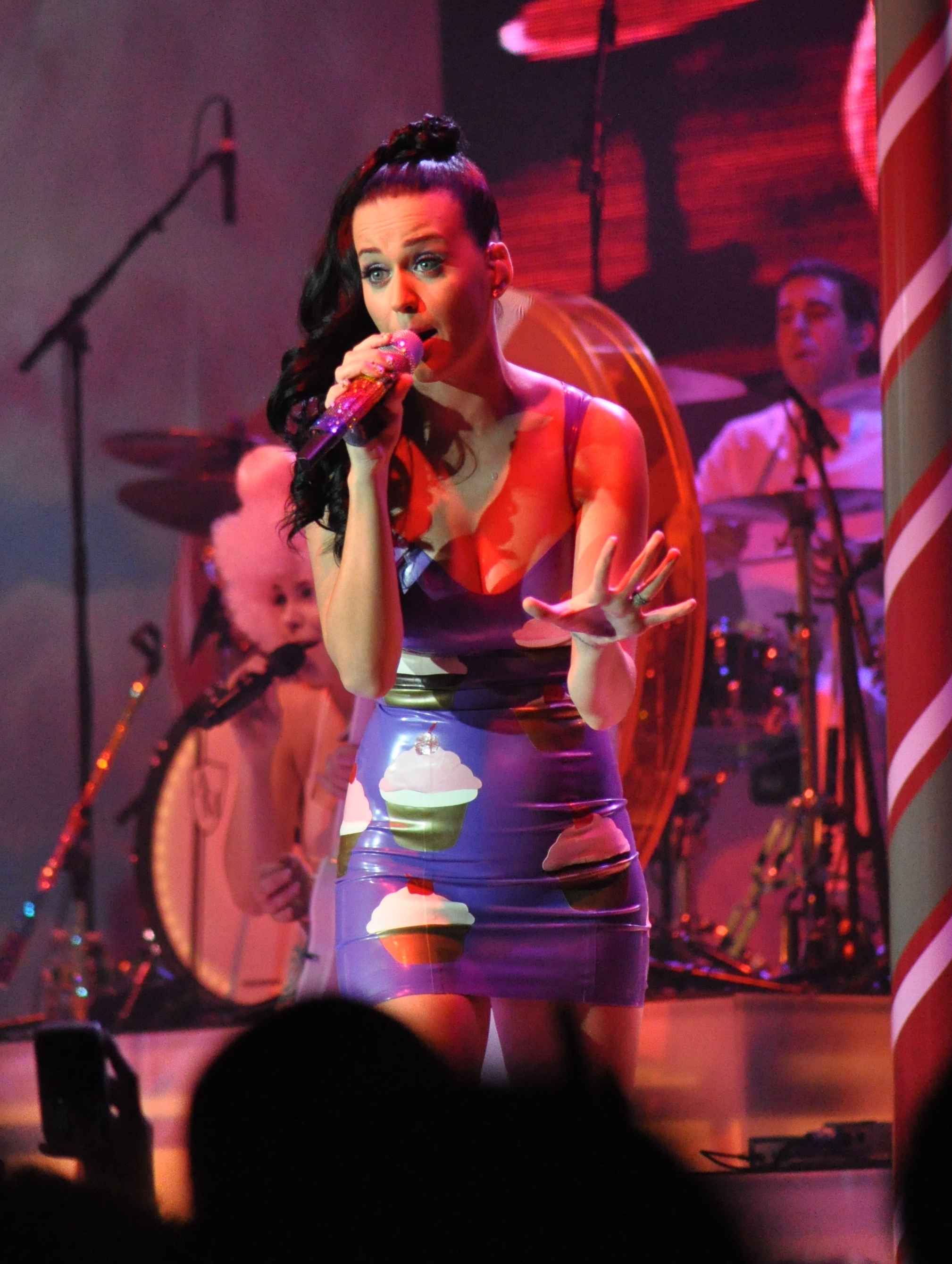
Katy Perry made her chart debut in 2008 with her number-one hit "I Kissed a Girl". She also reached number 4 with follow-up single "Hot n Cold".

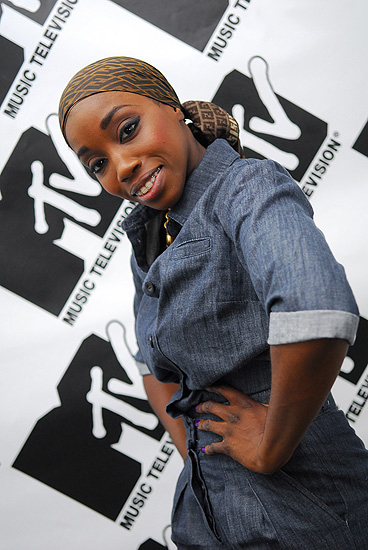
Estelle collaborated with Kanye West on her hit single "American Boy". It spent four weeks at number-one and became the sixth best-selling song of the year.

The UK Singles Chart is one of many music charts compiled by the Official Charts Company that calculates the best-selling singles of the week in the United Kingdom. Since 2004 the chart has been based on the sales of both physical singles and digital downloads, with airplay figures excluded from the official chart. This list shows singles that peaked in the Top 10 of the UK Singles Chart during 2008, as well as singles which peaked in 2007 and 2009 but were in the top 10 in 2008. The entry date is when the single appeared in the top 10 for the first time (week ending, as published by the Official Charts Company, which is six days after the chart is announced).

One-hundred and twenty-two singles were in the top ten in 2008. Nine singles from 2007 remained in the top 10 for several weeks at the beginning of the year, while "Broken Strings" by James Morrison and Nelly Furtado was released in 2008 but did not reach its peak until 2009. "Crank That" by Soulja Boy was the only song from 2007 to reach its peak in 2008. Twenty-nine artists scored multiple entries in the top 10 in 2008. Adele, Flo Rida, Katy Perry, Kings of Leon, The Script and The Saturdays were among the many artists who achieved their first UK charting top 10 single in 2008.

The 2007 Christmas number-one, "When You Believe" by 2007 X Factor winner Leon Jackson, remained at number-one for the first two weeks of 2008. The first new number-one single of the year was "Now You're Gone" by Basshunter featuring DJ Mental Theo's Bazzheadz. Overall, twenty different singles peaked at number-one in 2008, with Alexandra Burke (2) having the most singles hit that position (including her credit on "Hero" with The X Factor Finalists 2008).

== Background ==
=== Multiple entries ===
One-hundred and twenty-two singles charted in the top 10 in 2008, with one-hundred and twelve singles reaching their peak this year. Two versions of the Leonard Cohen song "Hallelujah" - Alexandra Burke's X Factor winners single and Jeff Buckley's 1994 recording which was re-released in 2007 - reached the top 10.

Twenty-eight artists scored multiple entries in the top 10 in 2008. Cheryl Cole, Leona Lewis and Rihanna shared the record for most top 10 hits in 2008 with four hit singles each.

=== Chart debuts ===
Fifty-three artists achieved their first top 10 single in 2008, either as a lead or featured artist. Of these, eight went on to record another hit single that year: Alexandra Burke, Basshunter, Duffy, Geraldine McQueen, Katy Perry, Kings of Leon, The Saturdays and The Ting Tings.

The following table (collapsed on desktop site) does not include acts who had previously charted as part of a group and secured their first top 10 solo single.

Artist	Number of top 10s	First entry	Chart position	Other entries
Basshunter	2	"Now You're Gone"	1	"All I Ever Wanted" (2)
DJ Mental Theo's Bazzheadz	1	"Now You're Gone"	1	—
Lupe Fiasco	1	"Superstar"	4	—
Matthew Santos	1	"Superstar"	4	—
Adele	1	"Chasing Pavements"	2	—
Hot Chip	1	"Ready for the Floor"	6	—
One Night Only	1	"Just for Tonight"	9	—
David Jordan	1	"Sun Goes Down"	5	—
Duffy	2	"Mercy"	1	"Warwick Avenue" (3)
H "Two" O	1	"What's It Gonna Be"	2	—
Platnum	1	"What's It Gonna Be"	2	—
Taio Cruz	1	"Come On Girl"	5	—
Alphabeat	1	"Fascination"	6	—
Flo Rida	1	"Low"	2	—
T-Pain	1	"Low"	2	—
Sam Sparro	1	"Black and Gold"	2	—
September	1	"Cry for You"	5	—
The Last Shadow Puppets	1	"The Age of the Understatement"	9	—
Wiley	1	"Wearing My Rolex"	2	—
Pendulum	1	"Propane Nightmares"	9	—
The Ting Tings	2	"That's Not My Name"	1	"Shut Up and Let Me Go" (6)
Sara Bareilles	1	"Love Song"	4	—
Gabriella Cilmi	1	"Sweet About Me"	6	—
Jordin Sparks	1	"No Air"	3	—
Chrome	1	"Dance wiv Me"	1	—
Ironik	1	"Stay with Me"	5	—
Kid Rock	1	"All Summer Long"	1	—
The Script	1	"The Man Who Can't Be Moved"	2	—
Katy Perry	2	"I Kissed a Girl"	1	"Hot n Cold" (4)
The Saturdays	2	"If This Is Love"	8	"Up" (5)
Noah and the Whale	1	"5 Years Time"	7	—
Madcon	1	"Beggin'"	5	—
Biffy Clyro	1	"Mountains"	5	—
Kings of Leon	2	"Sex on Fire"	1	"Use Somebody" (2)
The-Dream	1	"Cookie Jar"	6	—
Iglu & Hartly	1	"In This City"	5	—
Geraldine McQueen	2	"The Winner's Song"	2	"Once Upon a Christmas Song" (5)
Stunt	1	"Raindrops (Encore une fois)"	9	—
The X Factor Finalists 2008	1	"Hero"	1	—
Alexandra Burke	2	"Hero"	1	"Hallelujah" (1)
Austin Drage	1	"Hero"	1	—
Bad Lashes	1	"Hero"	1	—
Daniel Evans	1	"Hero"	1	—
Diana Vickers	1	"Hero"	1	—
Eoghan Quigg	1	"Hero"	1	—
Girlband	1	"Hero"	1	—
JLS	1	"Hero"	1	—
Laura White	1	"Hero"	1	—
Rachel Hylton	1	"Hero"	1	—
Ruth Lorenzo	1	"Hero"	1	—
Scott Bruton	1	"Hero"	1	—
Jeff Buckley	1	"Hallelujah"	2	—
Sir Terry Wogan	1	"Little Drummer Boy/Peace on Earth" ^{[G]}	3	—

Notes

Chris Martin had his first official credit outside Coldplay (aside from the Band Aid 20 charity single in 2004) singing vocals on Kanye West's "Homecoming" which peaked at number 9. Alex Turner from The Last Shadow Puppets had previous chart success as part of the Arctic Monkeys but "The Age of the Understatement" was his first chart entry with his new group.

Frankie Sandford and Rochelle Humes of The Saturdays were formerly members of S Club Juniors (later known as S Club 8) who had multiple top 10 entries in 2002 and 2003. Peter Kay, who played the character Geraldine McQueen, had previous chart credits on "Is This the Way to Amarillo in 2005 and "(I'm Gonna Be) 500 Miles" in 2007, but "The Winner's Song" was his first entry as McQueen.

Estelle had her first chart hit in 2008 on "American Boy" with Kanye West but she was a vocalist on the number-one Band Aid 20 single "Do They Know It's Christmas?" in 2004. Alexandra Burke sang on "Hero" with her fellow X Factor series five contestants prior to her debut solo hit "Hallelujah". JLS and Diana Vickers would both go on to record number-one singles in later years.

Alesha Dixon recorded her first solo top 10 in 2008, "The Boy Does Nothing" which peaked at number five. Her previous chart entries were as part of girl group Mis-Teeq. After chart success with The White Stripes and The Raconteurs, Jack White peaked at number 9 with his solo single "Another Way to Die" with Alicia Keys, recorded for the Quantum of Solace soundtrack.

=== Songs from films ===
Original songs from various films entered the top 10 throughout the year. These included "Low" (from Step Up 2: The Streets), "You Make It Real" (He's Just Not That Into You) and "Another Way to Die" (Quantum of Solace).

=== Charity singles ===
A number of singles recorded for charity reached the top 10 in the charts in 2008. The Sport Relief single was "Footprints in the Sand" by Leona Lewis, which was released as a double-A side single with "Better in Time". It peaked at number two on 22 March 2008 after a performance on the telethon.

The finalists from the fifth series of The X Factor (which included winner Alexandra Burke, JLS and Diana Vickers) got together for a single, "Hero", which had been a hit for Mariah Carey. It reached number one on 8 November 2008, with profits going to benefit Help for Heroes and The Royal British Legion.

McFly's official Children in Need single for 2008, "Do Ya/Stay with Me", only reached number 18 in the chart. However Sir Terry Wogan and Aled Jones ranked at number 3 with a cover version of "Peace on Earth/Little Drummer Boy", originally by David Bowie and Bing Crosby, for the same cause on 20 December 2008.

=== Best-selling singles ===
Alexandra Burke had the best-selling single of the year with "Hallelujah". The song spent five weeks in the top 10 (including three weeks at number one), sold over 887,000 copies and was certified platinum by the BPI. "Hero" by The X Factor Finalists 2008 came in second place, selling more than 751,000 copies and losing out by around 136,000 sales. Duffy's "Mercy", "I Kissed a Girl" from Katy Perry and "Rockstar" by Nickelback made up the top five. Singles by Estelle featuring Kanye West, Kings of Leon, Basshunter, Madonna & Justin Timberlake and Sam Sparro were also in the top ten best-selling singles of the year.

"Hallelujah" (5) was also ranked in the top 10 best-selling singles of the decade.

== Top-ten singles ==
Key

Symbol	Meaning
‡	Single peaked in 2007 but still in chart in 2008.
♦	Single released in 2008 but peaked in 2009.
(#)	Year-end top ten single position and rank
Entered	The date that the single first appeared in the chart.
Peak	Highest position that the single reached in the UK Singles Chart.

Entered (week ending)	Weeks in top 10	Single	Artist	Peak	Peak reached (week ending)	Weeks at peak
Singles in 2007
13 October 2007	13	"Valerie" ‡	Mark Ronson featuring Amy Winehouse	2	27 October 2007	1
27 October 2007	13	"Apologize" ‡	Timbaland presents OneRepublic	3	17 November 2007	2
3 November 2007	11	"Bleeding Love" ‡	Leona Lewis	1	3 November 2007	7
3 November 2007	12	"Rule the World" ‡	Take That	2	3 November 2007	4
17 November 2007	6	"No One" ‡	Alicia Keys	6	24 November 2007	2
1 December 2007	6	"Heartbroken" ‡	T2 featuring Jodie Aysha	2	1 December 2007	3
1 December 2007	7	"Call the Shots" ‡	Girls Aloud	3	8 December 2007	2
15 December 2007	8	"Crank That (Soulja Boy)"	Soulja Boy Tell'em	2	12 January 2008	1
22 December 2007	3	"Fairytale of New York" ‡	The Pogues featuring Kirsty McColl	4	29 December 2007	1
29 December 2007	4	"When You Believe" ‡	Leon Jackson	1	29 December 2007	3
Singles in 2008
12 January 2008	14	"Rockstar" (#5)	Nickelback	2	16 February 2008	2
19 January 2008	10	"Now You're Gone" (#8)	Basshunter featuring DJ Mental Theo's Bazzheadz	1	19 January 2008	5
19 January 2008	5	"Piece of Me"	Britney Spears	2	19 January 2008	1
19 January 2008	9	"Don't Stop the Music"	Rihanna	4	2 February 2008	2
19 January 2008	5	"Superstar"	Lupe Fiasco featuring Matthew Santos	4	26 January 2008	1
19 January 2008	3	"Elvis Ain't Dead"	Scouting for Girls	8	26 January 2008	2
26 January 2008	7	"Chasing Pavements"	Adele	2	26 January 2008	3
26 January 2008	1	"Homecoming"	Kanye West featuring Chris Martin	9	26 January 2008	1
26 January 2008	2	"Be Mine!"	Robyn	10	26 January 2008	2
2 February 2008	6	"Work"	Kelly Rowland	4	9 February 2008	1
9 February 2008	2	"Ready for the Floor"	Hot Chip	6	9 February 2008	1
9 February 2008	1	"Just for Tonight"	One Night Only	9	9 February 2008	1
9 February 2008	5	"Sun Goes Down"	David Jordan	4	23 February 2008	1
16 February 2008	1	"Weightless"	Wet Wet Wet	10	16 February 2008	1
23 February 2008	11	"Mercy" (#3)	Duffy	1	23 February 2008	5
23 February 2008	6	"What's It Gonna Be"	H "Two" O featuring Platnum	2	1 March 2008	3
23 February 2008	1	"I Thought It Was Over"	The Feeling	9	23 February 2008	1
23 February 2008	1	"A&E"	Goldfrapp	10	23 February 2008	1
1 March 2008	2	"Wow"	Kylie Minogue	5	1 March 2008	2
1 March 2008	6	"Stop and Stare"	OneRepublic	4	15 March 2008	3
15 March 2008	2	"Come On Girl"	Taio Cruz	5	15 March 2008	1
15 March 2008	3	"Fascination"	Alphabeat	6	22 March 2008	1
15 March 2008	1	"Us Against the World"	Westlife	8	15 March 2008	1
15 March 2008	10	"Low"	Flo Rida featuring T-Pain	2	5 April 2008	2
22 March 2008	5	"Better in Time"/"Footprints in the Sand" ^{[H]}	Leona Lewis	2	22 March 2008	1
22 March 2008	2	"Something Good '08"	Utah Saints	8	29 March 2008	1
29 March 2008	9	"American Boy" (#6)	Estelle featuring Kanye West	1	29 March 2008	4
29 March 2008	12	"4 Minutes" (#9)	Madonna featuring Justin Timberlake & Timbaland	1	26 April 2008	4
29 March 2008	1	"Can't Speak French"	Girls Aloud	9	29 March 2008	1
5 April 2008	12	"Black and Gold" (#10)	Sam Sparro	2	19 April 2008	4
5 April 2008	3	"With You"	Chris Brown	8	5 April 2008	1
12 April 2008	3	"Always Where I Need to Be"	The Kooks	3	12 April 2008	1
12 April 2008	3	"Touch My Body"	Mariah Carey	5	19 April 2008	1
19 April 2008	8	"Cry for You"	September	5	26 April 2008	2
26 April 2008	7	"Love in This Club"	Usher featuring Young Jeezy	4	10 May 2008	1
26 April 2008	1	"The Age of the Understatement"	The Last Shadow Puppets	9	26 April 2008	1
3 May 2008	6	"Wearing My Rolex"	Wiley	2	17 May 2008	1
3 May 2008	8	"Heartbreaker"	will.i.am featuring Cheryl Cole	4	17 May 2008	3
3 May 2008	2	"Heartbeat"	Scouting for Girls	10	3 May 2008	2
10 May 2008	1	"Propane Nightmares"	Pendulum	9	10 May 2008	1
17 May 2008	3	"Violet Hill"	Coldplay	8	17 May 2008	2
17 May 2008	1	"In My Arms"	Kylie Minogue	10	17 May 2008	1
24 May 2008	7	"That's Not My Name"	The Ting Tings	1	24 May 2008	1
24 May 2008	10	"Take a Bow"	Rihanna	1	31 May 2008	2
31 May 2008	6	"Warwick Avenue"	Duffy	3	7 June 2008	1
7 June 2008	11	"Closer"	Ne-Yo	1	5 July 2008	1
14 June 2008	3	"Singin' in the Rain"	Mint Royale	1	14 June 2008	2
14 June 2008	4	"Love Song"	Sara Bareilles	4	28 June 2008	1
14 June 2008	7	"Sweet About Me"	Gabriella Cilmi	6	21 June 2008	2
14 June 2008	6	"Forever"	Chris Brown	4	5 July 2008	1
28 June 2008	4	"Viva la Vida"	Coldplay	1	28 June 2008	1
28 June 2008	10	"No Air"	Jordin Sparks & Chris Brown	3	5 July 2008	3
5 July 2008	3	"We Made It"	Busta Rhymes featuring Linkin Park	10	5 July 2008	3
12 July 2008	10	"Dance wiv Me"	Dizzee Rascal featuring Calvin Harris & Chrome	1	12 July 2008	4
12 July 2008	6	"All I Ever Wanted"	Basshunter	2	19 July 2008	1
12 July 2008	4	"Stay with Me"	Ironik	5	19 July 2008	1
19 July 2008	10	"All Summer Long"	Kid Rock	1	9 August 2008	1
26 July 2008	1	"One for the Radio"	McFly	2	26 July 2008	1
26 July 2008	2	"Give It 2 Me"	Madonna	7	26 July 2008	1
26 July 2008	3	"Shut Up and Let Me Go"	The Ting Tings	6	2 August 2008	1
9 August 2008	8	"The Man Who Can't Be Moved"	The Script	2	30 August 2008	1
9 August 2008	11	"I Kissed a Girl" (#4)	Katy Perry	1	16 August 2008	5
9 August 2008	1	"If This Is Love"	The Saturdays	8	9 August 2008	1
9 August 2008	5	"5 Years Time"	Noah and the Whale	7	16 August 2008	1
16 August 2008	5	"Love Is Noise"	The Verve	4	23 August 2008	1
16 August 2008	11	"Disturbia"	Rihanna	3	6 September 2008	2
23 August 2008	6	"Beggin'"	Madcon	5	30 August 2008	1
30 August 2008	4	"Mountains"	Biffy Clyro	5	6 September 2008	1
6 September 2008	3	"Pjanoo"	Eric Prydz	2	6 September 2008	2
13 September 2008	6	"When I Grow Up"	The Pussycat Dolls	3	13 September 2008	2
20 September 2008	9	"Sex on Fire" (#7) ^{[A]}	Kings of Leon	1	20 September 2008	3
20 September 2008	1	"Thank You for a Lifetime"	Cliff Richard	3	20 September 2008	1
27 September 2008	1	"Lies"	McFly	4	27 September 2008	1
27 September 2008	4	"Cookie Jar"	Gym Class Heroes featuring The-Dream	6	27 September 2008	2
27 September 2008	4	"Miss Independent"	Ne-Yo	6	18 October 2008	1
27 September 2008	1	"Changes"	Will Young	10	27 September 2008	1
4 October 2008	3	"In This City"	Iglu & Hartly	5	4 October 2008	1
4 October 2008	1	"You Make It Real"	James Morrison	7	4 October 2008	1
4 October 2008	4	"Girls"	Sugababes	3	18 October 2008	1
4 October 2008	1	"There You'll Be" ^{[B]}	Faith Hill	10	4 October 2008	1
11 October 2008	6	"So What"	Pink	1	11 October 2008	3
11 October 2008	1	"The Shock of the Lightning"	Oasis	3	11 October 2008	1
11 October 2008	1	"Love You Anyway"	Boyzone	5	11 October 2008	1
18 October 2008	1	"Never Miss a Beat"	Kaiser Chiefs	5	18 October 2008	1
25 October 2008	2	"The Winner's Song"	Geraldine McQueen	2	25 October 2008	1
25 October 2008	1	"Don't Call This Love"	Leon Jackson	3	25 October 2008	1
25 October 2008	3	"Up"	The Saturdays	5	25 October 2008	1
25 October 2008	1	"Take Back the City"	Snow Patrol	6	25 October 2008	1
25 October 2008	2	"Raindrops (Encore Une Fois)"	Sash! featuring Stunt	9	25 October 2008	2
1 November 2008	6	"The Promise"	Girls Aloud	1	1 November 2008	1
1 November 2008	5	"Infinity 2008"	Guru Josh Project	3	1 November 2008	1
1 November 2008	2	"Wire to Wire"	Razorlight	5	1 November 2008	1
1 November 2008	11	"Hot n Cold"	Katy Perry	4	13 December 2008	1
1 November 2008	2	"Love Lockdown"	Kanye West	8	1 November 2008	2
8 November 2008	5	"Hero" (#2)	The X Factor Finalists 2008	1	8 November 2008	3
8 November 2008	2	"Another Way to Die"	Alicia Keys & Jack White	9	15 November 2008	1
15 November 2008	10	"If I Were a Boy"	Beyoncé	1	29 November 2008	1
15 November 2008	8	"Womanizer"	Britney Spears	3	13 December 2008	1
15 November 2008	3	"Forgive Me"	Leona Lewis	5	15 November 2008	1
15 November 2008	5	"The Boy Does Nothing"	Alesha Dixon	5	22 November 2008	1
22 November 2008	5	"Live Your Life"	T.I. featuring Rihanna	2	22 November 2008	1
22 November 2008	7	"Human"	The Killers	3	29 November 2008	1
6 December 2008	6	"Greatest Day"	Take That	1	6 December 2008	1
6 December 2008	3	"Right Now (Na Na Na)"	Akon	6	20 December 2008	1
13 December 2008	7	"Run"	Leona Lewis	1	13 December 2008	2
13 December 2008	13	"Use Somebody"	Kings of Leon	2	20 December 2008	1
20 December 2008	1	"Little Drummer Boy/Peace on Earth"	Bandaged (Sir Terry Wogan & Aled Jones)	3	20 December 2008	1
27 December 2008	5	"Hallelujah" (#1)	Alexandra Burke	1	27 December 2008	3
27 December 2008	2	"Hallelujah"	Jeff Buckley	2	27 December 2008	1
27 December 2008	2	"Once Upon a Christmas Song"	Geraldine McQueen	5	27 December 2008	1
27 December 2008	10	"Broken Strings" ♦	James Morrison featuring Nelly Furtado	2	17 January 2009	1
27 December 2008	1	"Listen"	Beyoncé	8	27 December 2008	1

== Entries by artist ==
The following table shows artists who achieved two or more top 10 entries in 2008, including singles that reached their peak in 2007 or 2009. The figures include both main artists and featured artists, while appearances on ensemble charity records are also counted for each artist. The total number of weeks an artist spent in the top ten in 2008 is also shown.

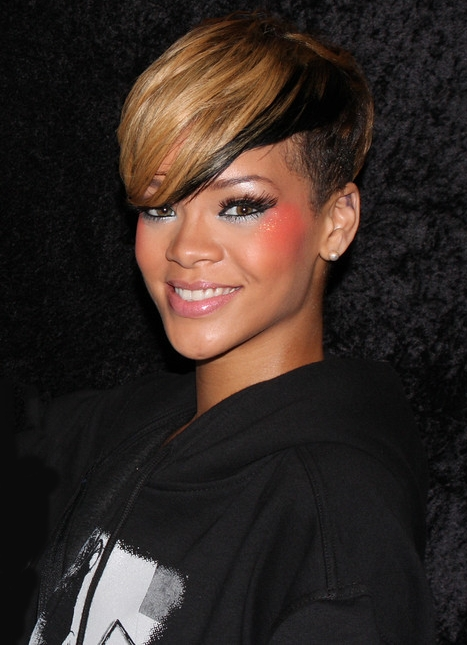
After "Umbrella"'s 10 week-run at number-one in 2007, Rihanna recorded four top 10s this year, including "Take a Bow", which spent two weeks at number-one.

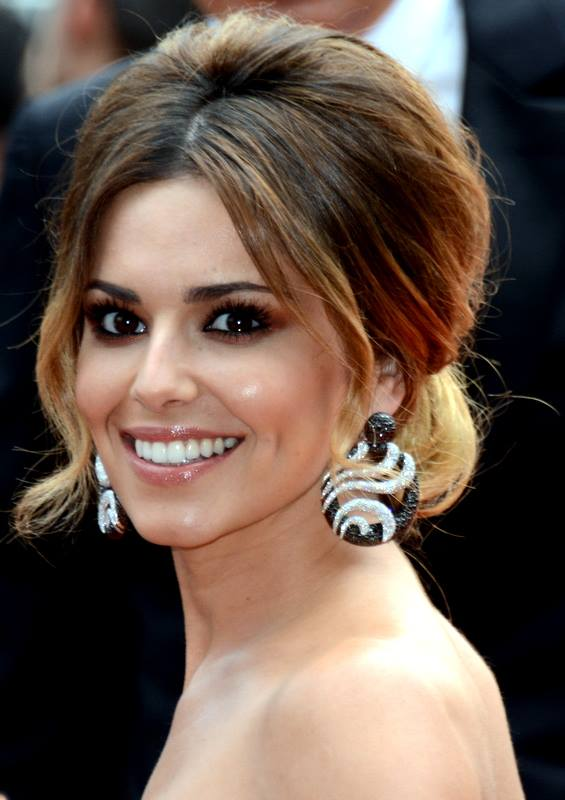
Cheryl Cole had her first top 10 single independent of Girls Aloud in 2008, featuring on will.i.am's number 4 hit "Heartbreaker". She additionally had three top 10 singles with the group, including the chart-topping "The Promise".

Entries	Artist	Weeks	Singles
4	Cheryl Cole ^{[D]}^{[G]}	9	"Call the Shots", "Can't Speak French", "Heartbreaker", "The Promise"
4	Leona Lewis ^{[D]}	13	"Better in Time"/"Footprints in the Sand", "Bleeding Love", "Forgive Me", "Run"
4	Rihanna ^{[J]}	35	"Disturbia", "Don't Stop the Music", "Live Your Life", "Take a Bow"
3	Chris Brown	18	"Forever", "No Air", "With You"
3	Chris Martin ^{[C]}^{[L]}	8	"Homecoming", "Violet Hill", "Viva la Vida"
3	Kanye West ^{[K]}	12	"American Boy", "Homecoming", "Love Lockdown"
3	Girls Aloud ^{[D]}	9	"Call the Shots", "Can't Speak French", "The Promise"
2	Alexandra Burke ^{[E]}	6	"Hallelujah", "Hero"
2	Alicia Keys ^{[D]}	3	"Another Way to Die", "No One"
2	Basshunter	16	"All I Ever Wanted", "Now You're Gone"
2	Beyoncé	8	"If I Were a Boy", "Listen"
2	Britney Spears	13	"Piece of Me", "Womanizer"
2	Coldplay	7	"Violet Hill", "Viva la Vida"
2	Duffy	17	"Mercy", "Warwick Avenue"
2	Geraldine McQueen	3	"Once Upon a Christmas Song", "The Winner's Song"
2	James Morrison ^{[F]}	5	"Broken Strings", "You Make It Real"
2	Katy Perry	20	"I Kissed a Girl", "Hot n Cold"
2	Kings of Leon	11	"Sex on Fire", "Use Somebody"
2	Kylie Minogue	3	"In My Arms", "Wow"
2	Leon Jackson ^{[D]}	4	"Don't Call This Love", "When You Believe"
2	Madonna	14	"4 Minutes", "Give It 2 Me"
2	McFly	2	"Lies", "One for the Radio"
2	Ne-Yo	15	"Closer", "Miss Independent"
2	OneRepublic ^{[D]}	9	"Apologize", "Stop and Stare"
2	The Saturdays	4	"If This Is Love", "Up"
2	Scouting for Girls	5	"Elvis Ain't Dead", "Heartbeat"
2	Take That ^{[D]}	7	"Greatest Day", "Rule the World"
2	The Ting Tings	10	"Shut Up and Let Me Go", "That's Not My Name"

== Notes ==
- ^{a} "Sex on Fire" re-entered the top 10 at number 6 on 12 September 2009 (week ending) after a performance of the song by Jamie Archer on The X Factor.
- ^{b} "There You'll Be" originally peaked at number 3 when it was released in 2001.
- ^{c} Figure includes two hit singles with the group Coldplay.
- ^{d} Figure includes song that peaked in 2007.
- ^{e} Figure includes single as part of The X Factor Finalists 2008.
- ^{f} Figure includes song that peaked in 2009.
- ^{g} Figure includes three hit singles with the group Girls Aloud.
- ^{h} Released as an official single for Children in Need and featured on the BandAged CD.
- ^{i} Released as the official single for Sport Relief.
- ^{j} Figure includes appearance on T.I.'s "Live Your Life".
- ^{k} Figure includes appearance on Estelle's "American Boy".
- ^{l} Figure includes appearance on Kanye West's "Homecoming".

== See also ==
- 2008 in British music
- List of number-one singles from the 2000s (UK)
