= Karl Lucas =

English comedian, actor and writer

- Born: Karl John Lucas; 27 March 1972 (age 54); Manchester, England, UK
- Notable work: Peter Kay's Britain's Got the Pop Factor... and Possibly a New Celebrity Jesus Christ Soapstar Superstar Strictly on Ice (2008); Phoenix Nights (2001–02); Osbournes Reloaded. (2008–09); Ant and Dec's Saturday Night Takeaway (2002–present); Three Sony Awards (1999/2000). (2004)

Comedy career
- Years active: 1995–present

Karl John Lucas (born 27 March 1972) is an English comedian, actor and writer, who has written for and appeared in a number of television, music videos and radio comedy programmes, as well as various theatre productions.

Lucas worked on Galaxy 102's Breakfast show which collectively won three Sony Awards (1999/2000) — Gold in 1999 and Silver in 2000 for Best Breakfast Show. Lucas was writer and comedy sidekick on the show and was awarded his own Sony Award (Bronze) for his part of the 'Sticker Vicar' in 1999.

Lucas is a graduate of the University of Salford, with a BA Honours and HND in Performing Arts. He graduated with distinction in 1996 and is listed on the Manchester Evening News' 'Hall of Fame'.

Lucas played Richard, a member of the fictional Pop group 2 Up, 2 down on Peter Kay's Britain's Got the Pop Factor... and Possibly a New Celebrity Jesus Christ Soapstar Superstar Strictly on Ice (2008) a spoof on the talent show genre of programmes. Some of the shows most memorable moments saw 2 Up 2 Down singing a duet with Rick Astley, getting Hip-Hop dance lessons off Lionel Blair and Richard's rap in the middle of "The Winner's Song" (co-written by Gary Barlow).

He is one of the only British comedians who has worked as a warm up on American TV shows: America's Got Talent and Osbournes Reloaded.

Karl is the sole director of Pink Walrus Productions Limited.

== Peter Kay ==
Lucas has worked with Peter Kay on many of his TV, DVD, music and stand-up projects, as a writer, actor and director. He was a tour manager for Peter Kay's "Mum Wants a Bungalow" Tour and filmed/directed a documentary called One Hundred and Eighty: The Tour Documentary. Lucas supports Comic Relief and has donated his time as a consultant writer/backstage director on the Comic Relief charity singles "500 Miles" and "Is this the way to Amarillo", and has cameo appearances in both videos.

== Writing ==
Lucas has written scripts, story lines, additional material, sketches and provided material for Peter Kay's Britain's Got the Pop Factor... and Possibly a New Celebrity Jesus Christ Soapstar Superstar Strictly on Ice, The Coronation Street Panto, Coronation Street, You've Been Framed, Ant and Dec's Saturday Night Takeaway, A Question of TV, Soap Fever, Loose Women, Max and Paddy's Power of Two, and Osbournes Reloaded in the U.S.

In 2011 he wrote and directed This Morning's first ever live Pantomime. Cinderella featured the regular cast in an all singing and dancing live spectacular.

== TV appearances ==
- Derren Brown's Remote Control as Voice Over Man
- Shameless (Channel 4) as Branson
- Emmerdale: The Dingles – For Richer for Poorer as Fridge (director: Tim O'Mara)
- Peter Kay's Britain's Got the Pop Factor... and Possibly a New Celebrity Jesus Christ Soapstar Superstar Strictly on Ice as Richard in (TwoUp-TwoDown) (director: Peter Kay)
- Raiders of the Pop Charts as himself
- Raiders of the Pop Charts II as himself
- Britain's Got The Pop Factor ... and Then Some! as Richard
- Osbournes: Reloaded (Fox TV) as New Family Member
- Loose Women (ITV) in various roles
- Shameless (Channel 4) as Paramedic
- Ideal (BBC) as Peter (Ginger Elvis)
- Mischief "Is it coz I is Black?" (BBC) as Presenter (director: Sam Lewens)
- Waterloo Road (BBC) as Radio Presenter
- One Hundred and Eighty: The Tour Documentary as Himself
- Peter Kay Night (Channel 4) as himself
- Max & Paddy's Power of Two (Channel 4) as Woman in Burka
- Peter Kay Live at the Manchester Arena (Channel 4) as Himself
- Celebrities Under Pressure (ITV) as Elvis
- Phoenix Nights (Channel 4) as Ass TV Presenter Baz Hastings
- You've Been Framed! (ITV) as Caretaker
- Newsnight (BBC) as Himself (2002)
- Soap Fever (ITV) as various characters (with Emma Kennedy)

== DVD appearances ==
- Emmerdale: The Dingles – For Richer for Poorer as Fridge (director: Tim O'Mara)
- Britain's Got The Pop Factor ... And Possibly A New Celebrity Jesus Christ Soapstar Superstar Strictly On Ice (DVD) (2009)
- Shameless (DVD) (2008)
- Special Kay (DVD) (2008)
- Waterloo Road (DVD) (2007)
- Ideal (DVD) (2007)
- Peter Kay – Stand Up UKay (DVD) (2007)
- Max and Paddy's Power of Two (DVD)(2005)
- Live at the Manchester Arena (DVD) (2005)
- Phoenix Nights (DVD)(2001–2002)

== TV warm-up ==
Lucas has been a TV warm-up man since 1994. His first professional job in TV was a warm-up man on University Challenge. He has since worked on such shows as Loose Women Ant & Dec's Saturday Night Takeaway, Strictly Come Dancing, and The Voice UK. He also worked on Epic Win and Let's Do Lunch with Gino & Mel.

== TV producing ==
Lucas worked in the USA as a Content Producer (2008–09) for Fremantle Media on Osbournes:Reloaded.

== TV presenting ==
- Mischief "Is it coz I is Black?" (BBC) as Presenter (director: Sam Lewens)
- Soap Fever ITV2 (1999-2003)

== Radio presenting ==
- Chrysalis Radio, Galaxy 102 FM The Adam Cole Breakfast Show, as writer, presenter and the part of Sticker Vicar
- Faze FM Kiss 102, The Grainne Landowski Breakfast Show (Faze Radio) as Co-Host and writer.

== DJ ==
Lucas is also a disc jockey having worked at Nightclubs and Venues all around the UK (including the infamous Hacienda nightclub), and in the USA where he DJ'd the America's Got Talent wrap party at CBS Studios.

== Theatre ==
- The Last Chair as Man (24:7 Theatre Festival)
- Granny Must Die as Devil/Bishop (24/7 Theatre Festival)
- The Dumb Waiter as Ben (Not the International Theatre Festival)
- Noises Off as Garry/Roger (Guide Bridge Theatre)
- Loot as Dennis (Guide Bridge Theatre)
- The Funny Farm (Improvisation) (Guide Bridge Theatre)
- Stab/Zombie (Edinburgh Festival (Aspects Theatre Company)
- The Best Little Whorehouse in Texas as Melvin p Thorpe (Aspects Theatre Company)
- Chicago as Billy Flynn (Aspects Theatre Company)
- The Tempest as Antonio (Aspects Theatre Company)
- Grease as Teen Angel (Aspects Theatre Company)

== Cabaret ==
- The Funny Farm Toured as part of Improvised Comedy Group (1999–2000)
- Hosted Mad abbott Cabaret Edinburgh Festival (1992 and 1995)

== Awards ==
In 1999 The Galaxy 102 Breakfast Show was awarded the Gold for best breakfast show and the Bronze Award for the 'Sticker Vicar'. In 2000, the Galaxy 102 Breakfast Show was awarded a silver Sony Award, Karl's third Sony Award. Peter Kay's Britain's Got the Pop Factor... and Possibly a New Celebrity Jesus Christ Soapstar Superstar Strictly on Ice was Peter Kay's first original show for four years, and achieved 7.1 million viewers – making it one of Channel 4's highest rated shows of all time.

Winner of 'Best Comedy Performance' at the RTS Awards – describing it as "brilliantly visually realised, and a perfect parody of the genre"; the series received 'Best British Comedy Television Programme' award from BAFTA LA and the 'Best Music/Variety Program' at the Banff World Television awards and also received an Emmy nomination for International Comedy in 2009.
