= 2008 in British music charts =

This is a summary of the year 2008 in British music in terms of the charts. 21 singles occupied the number one position during the year, with 11 being new.

== Summary of UK Singles Chart activity ==
=== January ===
The 6 January chart saw The X Factor winner Leon Jackson at number one in the Singles Chart for a third week with "When You Believe". Radiohead achieved their fifth number-one album at the start of the month with In Rainbows, an album released three months earlier on the group's website on a "pay what you want" policy. Nickelback climbed into the top ten with "Rockstar" and Soulja Boy Tell 'Em's "Crank That" climbed to number two.

Scottish singer Amy Macdonald climbed to number one on 13 January with her debut album This Is the Life, six months after the album's release. Swedish DJ Basshunter went to number one with his UK debut single "Now You're Gone". Britney Spears climbed to number two with "Piece of Me", while Lupe Fiasco debuted in the top ten on downloads alone with "Superstar".

London band Scouting for Girls climbed to number one on 20 January with their eponymous debut album Scouting for Girls, on the strength of the success of their singles "She's So Lovely" and "Elvis Ain't Dead". "Chasing Cars" by Snow Patrol overtook "Amazing Grace" by Judy Collins to become the second most charted single in the history of the UK charts with 68 weeks inside the top 75. BRIT School graduate Adele entered the top ten at number two on downloads alone with "Chasing Pavements", while Kanye West's latest single "Homecoming", featuring Chris Martin, peaked at number nine, and "Be Mine!", the fourth single from Robyn's eponymous top 20 album Robyn, climbed 13 places to its peak at number ten.

On 27 January, Basshunter stayed at number one for a third week, holding off the heavily favoured Adele, who failed to climb from her download-only position of number two with a physical release of "Chasing Pavements". Nickelback's "Rockstar" reached a new peak of number three fourteen weeks after its initial debut, and Kelly Rowland climbed to number seven on downloads alone making a jump of 24 places with "Work". On the Albums Chart, Lupe Fiasco's album Lupe Fiasco's The Cool debuted at number seven, and Robert Plant and Alison Krauss's Raising Sand took the runner-up spot and a new peak behind Scouting for Girls.

=== February ===
On 3 February, Adele's debut album 19 went in at number one. Nickelback's All the Right Reasons climbed seven places to number three, and Welsh metalcore band Bullet for My Valentine were new at number five with Scream Aim Fire. In the singles, Basshunter held on to the top spot for a fourth week, while Kelly Rowland climbed to number four. There were new entries for electropop band Hot Chip at number six with "Ready for the Floor" and indie group One Night Only with "Just For Tonight" at number nine. British singer/songwriter David Jordan made his top ten debut with "Sun Goes Down" at number ten.

Hawaiian singer/songwriter Jack Johnson's album Sleep Through the Static was new at the top on 10 February. There were new entries for Hot Chip at number four with Made in the Dark and Mary J. Blige's Growing Pains at number six. Basshunter made it five weeks as the number one single, seeing off tough competition from Nickelback (number two) and Adele (number three), while David Jordan climbed to number five. Wet Wet Wet, who went to number one for fifteen weeks in 1994 with "Love Is All Around", scored their first top ten single in eleven years with "Weightless" at number ten, and soft rock band The Feeling also returned to the chart at number twelve with "I Thought It Was Over", the first single from their second album Join With Us.

Soul singer Duffy, who came second in the BBC's Sound of 2008 poll, entered the chart at number one with her retro–pop style second single "Mercy" on 17 February, pushing Basshunter down to number three. Dance act H "Two" O debuted in the chart with "What's It Gonna Be" at number seven, while Goldfrapp's "A&E" climbed into the top ten. United States pop rock band OneRepublic, who had success in 2007 with their debut single "Apologize", were new at number eleven with follow-up single "Stop and Stare".

The 2008 BRIT Awards took place on 20 February at Earls Court in London. Winners included Foo Fighters, Kate Nash, Mika and Take That (see 2008 in British music#Music awards).

On 24 February, Duffy stayed at number one for a second week, while Nickelback were replaced by H "Two" O at number two. Kylie Minogue's "Wow" climbed into the top ten, as did OneRepublic's "Stop & Stare". After a successful performance at the BRIT Awards ceremony, Mark Ronson and Amy Winehouse's "Valerie" climbed back into the top twenty, over thirty weeks after its original release. Ronson and Winehouse also saw an increase in sales of their albums, with Version and Back to Black both re-entering the top five.

=== March ===
Three months after its initial release, the deluxe edition of Amy Winehouse's Grammy Award-winning second album Back to Black climbed to number one on 2 March, holding off Goldfrapp's fourth studio album Seventh Tree which entered the chart at number two. Duffy held on to the singles top spot for a third week, managing to keep H "Two" O, Nickelback and Kylie Minogue all from climbing up.

Leona Lewis' double A-side Sport Relief charity single "Better in Time/Footprints in the Sand" peaked at number two on 16 March, earning Lewis her third consecutive UK top three hit. Dance duo Utah Saints climbed into the top ten with the remixed version of their 1992 hit "Something Good", while alternative rock band Panic! at the Disco entered the chart at #13 with "Nine in the Afternoon", the first single from their second album Pretty. Odd.. Duffy stayed on top of the albums for a second week with her debut Rockferry.

On 23 March, London hip hop sensation Estelle's single "American Boy", a collaboration with Kanye West, went to number one on download sales alone, ending Duffy's five-week-long reign at the top of the charts. Madonna returned to the chart with the Timbaland-produced "4 Minutes", featuring vocals from Justin Timberlake, at number seven. Girls Aloud scored their eighteenth UK top ten single with "Can't Speak French" which climbed to number nine, while their rivals the Sugababes missed out on the top ten with "Denial" peaking at number fifteen.

US rapper Flo Rida's "Low" was denied the top spot on 30 March, as Estelle and Kanye West held on for a second week. House musician Sam Sparro climbed into the top ten with "Black and Gold", as did Chris Brown's "With You". Duffy's album Rockferry stayed at number one for a fourth week, seeing off competition from Panic! at the Disco, Foals and OneRepublic.

=== April ===
In April, Madonna and Justin Timberlake's "4 Minutes" climbed to number one, earning Madonna her thirteenth UK number one single. Mariah Carey and Usher both returned to the top ten with "Touch My Body" and "Love in This Club" respectively. Hip-hop star will.i.am's second solo single "Heartbreaker", featuring guest vocals from Girls Aloud's Cheryl Cole, entered the top ten, along with British rapper Wiley's "Wearing My Rolex". New albums from R.E.M., The Kooks and Arctic Monkeys' frontman Alex Turner's side project The Last Shadow Puppets all topped the charts. Coldplay released their new single "Violet Hill" on their website as a free of charge download for one week, and it was subsequently downloaded two million times.

=== May ===
Number one albums in May were Madonna's Hard Candy, Scooter's Jumping All Over the World, Neil Diamond's Home Before Dark, and We Started Nothing by The Ting Tings, who also went to number one in the Singles Chart with their second single "That's Not My Name". Other new entries to the top ten included "In My Arms" by Kylie Minogue, Duffy's third single "Warwick Avenue", Coldplay's "Violet Hill", which was released commercially on 6 May, and Rihanna's "Take a Bow", which later climbed to number one.

=== June ===
After it was featured in George Sampson's winning performance on Britain's Got Talent, Mint Royale's 2005 top 20 hit "Singin' in the Rain" reentered the Singles Chart in June at number one following strong download sales. Other additions to the top ten included American singer and songwriter Sara Bareilles and Australian teen Gabriella Cilmi, along with R&B singers Chris Brown ("Forever"), Jordin Sparks ("No Air"), and Ne-Yo, who climbed to number one with latest single "Closer" - his second UK number one single to date. June was a big month for Coldplay, as they earned their first UK number one single with "Viva la Vida" and their album of the same name also went to number one, selling over 300,000 copies in its first week of release. Albums from Usher and Paul Weller also topped the charts.

=== July ===
In July, Dizzee Rascal's project with Calvin Harris and Chrome - "Dance wiv Me" - claimed the top spot on download sales alone; the first UK number one single for all three artists. Basshunter returned to the top five with "All I Ever Wanted", while his debut UK album Now You're Gone – The Album topped the Album Chart for one week. Country rocker Kid Rock made his top ten debut with "All Summer Long", and McFly scored their fourteenth top ten single with "One for the Radio". Other new additions to the top ten included singles by The Ting Tings ("Shut Up and Let Me Go") and Madonna ("Give It 2 Me").

=== August ===
On 3 August, Kid Rock's "All Summer Long" replaced Dizzee Rascal's "Dance wiv Me" at number one. One week later, however, American singer–songwriter Katy Perry's controversial debut UK single "I Kissed a Girl" claimed the top spot, after reaching number one in over twenty other countries. Elsewhere in August, Rihanna returned to the top ten with "Disturbia", and folk rock band Noah and the Whale made their top ten debut with "5 Years Time". Girl group The Saturdays made their debut this month with "If This Is Love" entering at #8 - even bigger success was to follow for their debut album and follow up singles later in the year and into 2009. Other new additions to the top ten included singles by Scottish band Biffy Clyro ("Mountains") and Norwegian band Madcon ("Beggin'"). Following the success of Mamma Mia!, ABBA's greatest hits album returned to number one - 16 years after it was originally released. Pop rock band The Script's debut album Script, and The Verve's comeback LP Forth also topped the charts.

=== September ===
"I Kissed A Girl" remained at number 1 for the fifth week in a row and Forth from The Verve stayed at number 1 in the album chart. Pussycat Dolls came back (with 1 less member) and their new single "When I Grow Up" which charted at number 3 on downloads alone. Kings of Leon soar to the top of the UK singles chart on 14 September with "Sex on Fire". It remained at the top spot the following week. Ne-Yo's third album Year of the Gentleman enters at number 2 on 21 September. Dreamgirls actress and formed American Idol contestant Jennifer Hudson enters at 15. On 28 September, Kings of Leon stay at number one for a third week. Their new album soars to the top of the album chart, with over 200,000 sales.

=== October ===
On 5 October Pink made it to number 1 with her new single "So What". Sugababes made a comeback with "Girls" which got to number 3 on the singles chart.

Oasis (Dig Out Your Soul), Boyzone (Back Again - No Matter What) and Keane (Perfect Symmetry) all had new albums, whilst, Kaiser Chiefs (Off with Their Heads) got to number 2 and Leon Jackson (Right Now) got to number 4 on 26 October.

On 20 October, Girls Aloud scored their fourth number one with The Promise. It was the lead single from their fifth studio album "Out of Control" which would also go on to reach number one in the album chart.

Also on 25 October the twelve finalists of the fifth series of The X Factor performed a new song for the Help for Heroes charity which Simon Cowell predicted will go straight to the top of the charts. It was released on download on 26 October and single on 27 October. Midweek sales revealed that this single had sold 100,500 copies on its first day - more than any single of 2008 so far has sold in a week, and more than twice the average weekly sale.

=== November ===
The X Factor Finalists reached number one on 2 November selling over 300,000 copies in its first week of release. On 9 November there were new entries by many well-known female artists including Christina Aguilera ("Keeps Gettin' Better"), Alesha Dixon ("The Boy Does Nothing"), Leona Lewis ("Forgive Me"), Britney Spears ("Womanizer") and Beyoncé ("If I Were a Boy") which charted at 14, 8, 5, 4 and 2 respectively.

Pink's new album Funhouse got the 1st No.1 album of November selling 112,000+, whilst there were new entries by Snow Patrol and Celine Dion, a week later Pink was knocked off the Album chart by Girls Aloud who scored their second number one album with Out of Control whilst there were greatest hits albums from Status Quo and Enrique Iglesias.

Beyoncé got her 4th No.1 with "If I Were a Boy" displacing charity single "Hero" after its three-week reign. The next week it was displaced by Take That's new song, who got their 11th No.1 single with "Greatest Day".

The deluxe version of Leona Lewis's debut album Spirit: The Deluxe Edition was released and shot straight to No.1 knocking off Il Divo's The Promise. Spirit: The Deluxe Edition was then knocked off by The Killers' 4th album Day & Age.

=== December ===
Leona Lewis' version of the Snow Patrol track "Run" was released digitally and went to number one on 7 December with sales of over 130,000 copies. Lewis held the top spot the following week too, selling a further 85,034 copies of the single in its second week of release. Take That's fifth studio album The Circus went to number one with sales of over 432,000 copies in its first week of release, while Britney Spears' sixth studio LP - similarly entitled Circus - charted at number four. Many classic Christmas songs, including Wham!'s "Last Christmas" and "Fairytale of New York" by The Pogues and Kirsty MacColl, returned to the chart throughout December.

Alexandra Burke won the fifth series of The X Factor on 13 December, and released her debut single - a cover of Leonard Cohen's track "Hallelujah" - on 14 December. The single sold 576,000 copies in its first week of release, and was the Christmas number one single of 2008. The late Jeff Buckley's version of "Hallelujah" - originally recorded for his 1994 album Grace - charted at number two, following a campaign to raise Buckley's version higher in the chart than Burke's version. Elsewhere in the Christmas chart, Geraldine McQueen's Christmas single "Once Upon a Christmas Song" charted at number five, while James Morrison and Nelly Furtado's "Broken Strings" climbed to number six. "Listen", a song recorded by Beyoncé for the 2006 movie Dreamgirls, returned to the top ten after Beyoncé and Alexandra Burke performed the track together on the final of The X Factor. Take That's The Circus was the Christmas number one album of 2008.

== Number ones ==
=== Number-one singles ===
Key
†	Best-selling single of the year

Chart date (week ending)	Song	Artist(s)	Sales
5 January	"When You Believe"	Leon Jackson	119,927
12 January	"When You Believe"	Leon Jackson	32,098
19 January	"Now You're Gone"	Basshunter	35,112
26 January	"Now You're Gone"	Basshunter	47,930
2 February	"Now You're Gone"	Basshunter	43,841
9 February	"Now You're Gone"	Basshunter	43,841
16 February	"Now You're Gone"	Basshunter	69,002
23 February	"Mercy"	Duffy	38,366
1 March	"Mercy"	Duffy	50,962
8 March	"Mercy"	Duffy	72,724
15 March	"Mercy"	Duffy	53,594
22 March	"Mercy"	Duffy	40,778
29 March	"American Boy"	Estelle featuring Kanye West	51,857
5 April	"American Boy"	Estelle featuring Kanye West	60,497
12 April	"American Boy"	Estelle featuring Kanye West	49,690
19 April	"American Boy"	Estelle featuring Kanye West	39,376
26 April	"4 Minutes"	Madonna featuring Justin Timberlake & Timbaland	40,995
3 May	"4 Minutes"	Madonna featuring Justin Timberlake & Timbaland	49,771
10 May	"4 Minutes"	Madonna featuring Justin Timberlake & Timbaland	38,965
17 May	"4 Minutes"	Madonna featuring Justin Timberlake & Timbaland	29,821
24 May	"That's Not My Name"	The Ting Tings	40,204
31 May	"Take a Bow"	Rihanna	41,005
7 June	"Take a Bow"	Rihanna	35,561
14 June	"Singin' in the Rain"	Mint Royale	45,987
21 June	"Singin' in the Rain"	Mint Royale	27,537
28 June	"Viva la Vida"	Coldplay	23,212
5 July	"Closer"	Ne-Yo	30,676
12 July	"Dance wiv Me"	Dizzee Rascal featuring Calvin Harris & Chrome	49,414
19 July	"Dance wiv Me"	Dizzee Rascal featuring Calvin Harris & Chrome	87,104
26 July	"Dance wiv Me"	Dizzee Rascal featuring Calvin Harris & Chrome	58,424
2 August	"Dance wiv Me"	Dizzee Rascal featuring Calvin Harris & Chrome	44,300
9 August	"All Summer Long"	Kid Rock	37,111
16 August	"I Kissed a Girl"	Katy Perry	45,935
23 August	"I Kissed a Girl"	Katy Perry	44,500
30 August	"I Kissed a Girl"	Katy Perry	41,131
6 September	"I Kissed a Girl"	Katy Perry	40,587
13 September	"I Kissed a Girl"	Katy Perry	46,293
20 September	"Sex on Fire"	Kings of Leon	44,943
27 September	"Sex on Fire"	Kings of Leon	50,834
4 October	"Sex on Fire"	Kings of Leon	44,936
11 October	"So What"	P!nk	53,264
18 October	"So What"	P!nk	44,037
25 October	"So What"	P!nk	44,982
1 November	"The Promise"	Girls Aloud	77,110
8 November	"Hero"	X Factor Finalists 2008	312,244
15 November	"Hero"	X Factor Finalists 2008	189,600
22 November	"Hero"	X Factor Finalists 2008	101,183
29 November	"If I Were a Boy"	Beyoncé	47,949
6 December	"Greatest Day"	Take That	70,302
13 December	"Run"	Leona Lewis	131,593
20 December	"Run"	Leona Lewis	85,034
27 December	"Hallelujah" †	Alexandra Burke	576,046

=== Number-one single downloads ===
Chart date (week ending)	Song	Artist(s)
5 January	"When You Believe"	Leon Jackson
12 January	"Apologize"	Timbaland presents OneRepublic
19 January	"Now You're Gone"	Basshunter
26 January	"Now You're Gone"	Basshunter
2 February	"Now You're Gone"	Basshunter
9 February	"Chasing Pavements"	Adele
16 February	"Rockstar"	Nickelback
23 February	"Mercy"	Duffy
1 March	"Mercy"	Duffy
8 March	"Mercy"	Duffy
15 March	"Mercy"	Duffy
22 March	"Mercy"	Duffy
29 March	"American Boy"	Estelle featuring Kanye West
5 April	"American Boy"	Estelle featuring Kanye West
12 April	"American Boy"	Estelle featuring Kanye West
19 April	"American Boy"	Estelle featuring Kanye West
26 April	"4 Minutes"	Madonna featuring Justin Timberlake & Timbaland
3 May	"4 Minutes"	Madonna featuring Justin Timberlake & Timbaland
10 May	"4 Minutes"	Madonna featuring Justin Timberlake & Timbaland
17 May	"4 Minutes"	Madonna featuring Justin Timberlake & Timbaland
24 May	"Take a Bow"	Rihanna
31 May	"That's Not My Name"	The Ting Tings
7 June	"Take a Bow"	Rihanna
14 June	"Singin' in the Rain"	Mint Royale
21 June	"Singin' in the Rain"	Mint Royale
28 June	"Viva la Vida"	Coldplay
5 July	"Viva la Vida"	Coldplay
12 July	"Dance wiv Me"	Dizzee Rascal featuring Calvin Harris & Chrome
19 July	"Dance wiv Me"	Dizzee Rascal featuring Calvin Harris & Chrome
26 July	"Dance wiv Me"	Dizzee Rascal featuring Calvin Harris & Chrome
2 August	"Dance wiv Me"	Dizzee Rascal featuring Calvin Harris & Chrome
9 August	"All Summer Long"	Kid Rock
16 August	"I Kissed a Girl"	Katy Perry
23 August	"I Kissed a Girl"	Katy Perry
30 August	"I Kissed a Girl"	Katy Perry
6 September	"I Kissed a Girl"	Katy Perry
13 September	"I Kissed a Girl"	Katy Perry
20 September	"Sex on Fire"	Kings of Leon
27 September	"Sex on Fire"	Kings of Leon
4 October	"Sex on Fire"	Kings of Leon
11 October	"So What"	P!nk
18 October	"So What"	P!nk
25 October	"So What"	P!nk
1 November	"The Promise"	Girls Aloud
8 November	"Hero"	X Factor Finalists 2008
15 November	"Hero"	X Factor Finalists 2008
22 November	"Live Your Life"	T.I. featuring Rihanna
29 November	"If I Were a Boy"	Beyoncé
6 December	"Greatest Day"	Take That
13 December	"Run"	Leona Lewis
20 December	"Run"	Leona Lewis
27 December	"Hallelujah"	Alexandra Burke

=== Number-one albums ===
Chart date (week ending)	Album	Artist	Sales
5 January	Spirit	Leona Lewis	116,561
12 January	In Rainbows	Radiohead	44,602
19 January	This Is the Life	Amy MacDonald	26,396
26 January	Scouting for Girls	Scouting for Girls	32,370
2 February	Scouting for Girls	Scouting for Girls	35,973
9 February	19	Adele	73,341
16 February	Sleep Through the Static	Jack Johnson	53,736
23 February	Sleep Through the Static	Jack Johnson	47,730
1 March	Join with Us	The Feeling	41,676
8 March	Back to Black: The Deluxe Edition	Amy Winehouse	62,773
15 March	Rockferry	Duffy	183,874
22 March	Rockferry	Duffy	97,645
29 March	Rockferry	Duffy	83,007
5 April	Rockferry	Duffy	45,185
12 April	Accelerate	R.E.M.	60,778
19 April	Rockferry	Duffy	31,087
26 April	Konk	The Kooks	65,901
3 May	The Age of the Understatement	The Last Shadow Puppets	54,296
10 May	Hard Candy	Madonna	94,655
17 May	Jumping All Over the World	Scooter	33,557
24 May	Home Before Dark	Neil Diamond	47,400
31 May	We Started Nothing	The Ting Tings	47,907
7 June	Here I Stand	Usher	56,403
14 June	22 Dreams	Paul Weller	58,924
21 June	Viva la Vida or Death and All His Friends	Coldplay	302,074
28 June	Viva la Vida or Death and All His Friends	Coldplay	197,978
5 July	Viva la Vida or Death and All His Friends	Coldplay	109,553
12 July	Viva la Vida or Death and All His Friends	Coldplay	58,509
19 July	Viva la Vida or Death and All His Friends	Coldplay	40,111
26 July	Now You're Gone – The Album	Basshunter	78,116
2 August	Viva la Vida or Death and All His Friends	Coldplay	62,853
9 August	ABBA Gold: Greatest Hits	ABBA	33,081
16 August	ABBA Gold: Greatest Hits	ABBA	38,161
23 August	The Script	The Script	54,520
30 August	The Script	The Script	37,121
6 September	Forth	The Verve	72,768
13 September	Forth	The Verve	35,512
20 September	Death Magnetic	Metallica	75,164
27 September	Death Magnetic	Metallica	59,509
4 October	Only by the Night	Kings of Leon	220,879
11 October	Only by the Night	Kings of Leon	108,215
18 October	Dig Out Your Soul	Oasis	200,866
25 October	Perfect Symmetry	Keane	79,106
1 November	Black Ice	AC/DC	110,978
8 November	Funhouse	Pink	112,419
15 November	Out of Control	Girls Aloud	85,670
22 November	The Promise	Il Divo	68,785
29 November	Spirit	Leona Lewis	76,727
6 December	Day & Age	The Killers	200,299
13 December	The Circus	Take That	432,490
20 December	The Circus	Take That	319,625
27 December	The Circus	Take That	380,885

=== Number-one compilation albums ===
Chart date (week ending)	Album
5 January	Now 68
12 January	Now 68
19 January	Ministry of Sound – Anthems 1991-2008
26 January	Big Tunes 2008
2 February	Big Tunes 2008
9 February	Big Tunes 2008
16 February	Ultimate NRG 3
23 February	Real Love
1 March	The Very Best of Euphoric Dance
8 March	You Raise Me Up 2008
15 March	The Very Best of Euphoric Dance
22 March	Floorfillers '08
29 March	Now 69
5 April	Now 69
12 April	Now 69
19 April	Clubland Classix – The Album of Your Life
26 April	Clubland Classix – The Album of Your Life
3 May	Clubland Classix – The Album of Your Life
10 May	Clubland Classix – The Album of Your Life
17 May	Clubland Classix – The Album of Your Life
24 May	Clubland Classix – The Album of Your Life
31 May	Chilled: 1991–2008
7 June	Chilled: 1991–2008
14 June	Chilled: 1991–2008
21 June	Chilled: 1991–2008
28 June	Chilled: 1991–2008
5 July	Clubland 13
12 July	Clubland 13
19 July	Mamma Mia!
26 July	Mamma Mia!
2 August	Now 70
9 August	Now 70
16 August	Now 70
23 August	Mamma Mia!
30 August	Mamma Mia!
6 September	Mamma Mia!
13 September	Mamma Mia!
20 September	Mamma Mia!
27 September	Mamma Mia!
4 October	Mamma Mia!
11 October	Mamma Mia!
18 October	Massive R&B – Winter 2008
25 October	Massive R&B – Winter 2008
1 November	High School Musical 3: Senior Year
8 November	High School Musical 3: Senior Year
15 November	High School Musical 3: Senior Year
22 November	Clubland 14
29 November	Now 71
6 December	Now 71
13 December	Now 71
20 December	Now 71
27 December	Now 71

=== Number-one album downloads ===
Chart date (week ending)	Album	Artist
5 January	Spirit	Leona Lewis
12 January	In Rainbows	Radiohead
19 January	In Rainbows	Radiohead
26 January	Clubbers Guide '08	Various Artists
2 February	Scouting for Girls	Scouting for Girls
9 February	19	Adele
16 February	Sleep Through the Static	Jack Johnson
23 February	Sleep Through the Static	Jack Johnson
1 March	Join with Us	The Feeling
8 March	Seventh Tree	Goldfrapp
15 March	Rockferry	Duffy
22 March	Rockferry	Duffy
29 March	Rockferry	Duffy
5 April	Rockferry	Duffy
12 April	Accelerate	R.E.M.
19 April	St. Jude	The Courteeners
26 April	Konk	The Kooks
3 May	The Age of the Understatement	The Last Shadow Puppets
10 May	Hard Candy	Madonna
17 May	Hard Candy	Madonna
24 May	In Silico	Pendulum
31 May	We Started Nothing	The Ting Tings
7 June	Here I Stand	Usher
14 June	Rockferry	Duffy
21 June	Viva la Vida or Death and All His Friends	Coldplay
28 June	Viva la Vida or Death and All His Friends	Coldplay
5 July	Viva la Vida or Death and All His Friends	Coldplay
12 July	Viva la Vida or Death and All His Friends	Coldplay
19 July	Viva la Vida or Death and All His Friends	Coldplay
26 July	Mamma Mia!	Various Artists
2 August	Now 70	Various Artists
9 August	Now 70	Various Artists
16 August	Mamma Mia!	Various Artists
23 August	The Script	The Script
30 August	The Script	The Script
6 September	Forth	The Verve
13 September	Forth	The Verve
20 September	Glasvegas	Glasvegas
27 September	Death Magnetic	Metallica
4 October	Only by the Night	Kings of Leon
11 October	Only by the Night	Kings of Leon
18 October	Dig Out Your Soul	Oasis
25 October	Perfect Symmetry	Keane
1 November	High School Musical 3: Senior Year	Various Artists
8 November	A Hundred Million Suns	Snow Patrol
15 November	A Hundred Million Suns	Snow Patrol
22 November	Forth	The Verve
29 November	Now 71	Various Artists
6 December	Day & Age	The Killers
13 December	The Circus	Take That
20 December	Christmas Hits – 80 Festive Favourites	Various Artists
27 December	Christmas Hits – 80 Festive Favourites	Various Artists

== Year-end charts ==
The Year-End charts were dominated by American and British artists in 2008. Fifteen of the top forty singles were by British people (including featured singles), while twenty were by American artists. Just four other nationalities were represented in the Top Forty: Barbadian (three singles involving Rihanna), Australian, Swedish (both two singles) and Canadian (one Nickelback single). The top 40 albums shows a chart dominated by British acts, while also showing albums from varied international artists.

The year's charts were dominated by Welsh singer Duffy, as her single "Mercy" reached #3 in the year-end charts, with her debut album effort, Rockferry attaining #1. Her single "Warwick Avenue" also charted at #30 in the year-end countdown. Other successful artists included Take That, Leona Lewis and Kings of Leon.

=== Best-selling singles of 2008 ===
No.	Title	Artist	Peak position	Sales
1	"Hallelujah"	Alexandra Burke	1	887,933
2	"Hero"	The X Factor Finalists 2008	1	751,243
3	"Mercy"	Duffy	1	535,644
4	"I Kissed a Girl"	Katy Perry	1	
5	"Rockstar"	Nickelback	2	469,652
6	"American Boy"	Estelle featuring Kanye West	1	
7	"Sex on Fire"	Kings of Leon	1	
8	"Now You're Gone"	Basshunter	1	
9	"4 Minutes"	Madonna featuring Justin Timberlake & Timbaland	1	
10	"Black and Gold"	Sam Sparro	2	
11	"Low"	Flo Rida featuring T-Pain	2	
12	"Dance wiv Me"	Dizzee Rascal featuring Calvin Harris and Chrome	1	
13	"Run"	Leona Lewis	1	
14	"So What"	Pink	1	
15	"Closer"	Ne-Yo	1	
16	"If I Were a Boy"	Beyoncé	1	
17	"The Promise"	Girls Aloud	1	349,450
18	"Disturbia"	Rihanna	3	
19	"All Summer Long"	Kid Rock	1	
20	"Take a Bow"	Rihanna	1	
21	"No Air"	Jordin Sparks featuring Chris Brown	3	
22	"That's Not My Name"	The Ting Tings	1	
23	"Hot n Cold"	Katy Perry	4	
24	"Don't Stop the Music"	Rihanna	4	
25	"Viva la Vida"	Coldplay	1	
26	"Sweet About Me"	Gabriella Cilmi	6	283,762
27	"Chasing Pavements"	Adele	2	
28	"The Man Who Can't Be Moved"	The Script	2	
29	"What's It Gonna Be"	H "Two" O featuring Platnum	2	
30	"Warwick Avenue"	Duffy	3	
31	"Heartbreaker"	will.i.am featuring Cheryl Cole	4	
32	"Love in This Club"	Usher featuring Young Jeezy	4	
33	"Womanizer"	Britney Spears	3	
34	"Wearing My Rolex"	Wiley	2	
35	"Cry for You"	September	5	
36	"Human"	The Killers	3	
37	"Better in Time"	Leona Lewis	2	
38	"Live Your Life"	T.I. featuring Rihanna	2	
39	"With You"	Chris Brown	8	
40	"Stop and Stare"	OneRepublic	4	
41	"Infinity 2008"	Guru Josh Project	3	
42	"Fascination"	Alphabeat	6	
43	"Love Lockdown"	Kanye West	8	
44	"Rule the World"	Take That	5 (Note: Reached number 2 in 2007)	
45	"When I Grow Up"	Pussycat Dolls	3	
46	"Forever"	Chris Brown	4	
47	"Piece of Me"	Britney Spears	2	
48	"The Boy Does Nothing"	Alesha Dixon	5	
49	"Greatest Day"	Take That	1	
50	"All I Ever Wanted"	Basshunter	2	

Note: the official list of best-selling singles of 2008 produced by the Official Chart Company and published in Music Week in the issue dated 17 January 2009 originally included "Superstar" by Lupe Fiasco at number 22. The following week (issue dated 24 January 2009) Music Week published a correction by the OCC to the effect that sales of "Superstar" had been overstated and it should have been placed at number 67, with all the original numbers 23 to 67 moving up one place. This has been reflected in the table above.

=== Best-selling albums of 2008 ===
No.	Title	Artist	Peak position	Sales
1	Rockferry	Duffy	1	1,684,944
2	The Circus	Take That	1	1,446,135
3	Only by the Night	Kings of Leon	1	1,181,640
4	Spirit	Leona Lewis	1	1,180,370
5	Viva la Vida or Death and All His Friends	Coldplay	1	1,086,962
6	Good Girl Gone Bad	Rihanna	2 (Note: Reached number 1 in 2007)	820,584
7	Day & Age	The Killers	1	703,213
8	Out of Control	Girls Aloud	1	591,785
9	Funhouse	Pink	1	587,984
10	Scouting for Girls	Scouting for Girls	1	574,630
11	All the Right Reasons	Nickelback	2	
12	The Script	The Script	1	544,028
13	Decade in the Sun: The Best of Stereophonics	Stereophonics	2	
14	Back to Black: The Deluxe Edition	Amy Winehouse	1	
15	Dig Out Your Soul	Oasis	1	
16	19	Adele	1	479,328
17	The Promise	Il Divo	1	
18	A Hundred Million Suns	Snow Patrol	2	
19	Gold: Greatest Hits	ABBA	1	
20	My Love: Essential Collection	Celine Dion	5	
21	This Is the Life	Amy Macdonald	1	
22	The Priests	The Priests	5	
23	We Started Nothing	The Ting Tings	1	
24	Year of the Gentleman	Ne-Yo	2	
25	Black Ice	AC/DC	1	
26	Life in Cartoon Motion	Mika	3 (Note: Reached number 1 in 2007)	
27	Call Me Irresponsible	Michael Bublé	4 (Note: Reached number 2 in 2007)	
28	Home Before Dark	Neil Diamond	1	
29	Rhydian	Rhydian	4	350,785
30	Let It Go	Will Young	2	
31	Greatest Hits	Enrique Iglesias	3	
32	Exclusive	Chris Brown	3	
33	Beautiful World	Take That	2 (Note: Reached number 1 in 2006)	
34	Raising Sand	Robert Plant & Alison Krauss	2	
35	The Seldom Seen Kid	Elbow	5	
36	Hard Candy	Madonna	1	323,113
37	Jackpot! The Best Bette	Bette Midler	6	
38	I Am... Sasha Fierce	Beyoncé	8 (Note: Reached number 2 in 2009)	311,734
39	The Best Of	Sash!	9	
40	Soul	Seal	12	
41	Chinese Democracy	Guns N' Roses	2	293,420
42	Uncle B	N-Dubz	11	
43	Jumping All Over the World	Scooter	1	
44	Simply Red 25: The Greatest Hits	Simply Red	9	
45	Now You're Gone – The Album	Basshunter	1	
46	Version	Mark Ronson	4 (Note: Reached number 2 in 2007)	
47	One of the Boys	Katy Perry	11	
48	Dreaming Out Loud	OneRepublic	2	
49	Perfect Symmetry	Keane	1	
50	Hand Built by Robots	Newton Faulkner	4 (Note: Reached number 1 in 2007)	

=== Best-selling compilation albums of 2008 ===
No.	Title	Peak position	Sales
1	Mamma Mia! The Movie Soundtrack	1	1,006,563
2	Now 71	1	964,218
3	Now 70	1	865,333
4	Now 69	1	832,673
5	High School Musical 3: Senior Year	1	
6	Clubland Classix	1	
7	Chilled 1991–2008	1	
8	Pop Party 6	2	
9	Radio 1's Live Lounge – Volume 3	2	
10	Anthems 1991–2008	1	

== See also ==
- List of UK Dance Singles Chart number ones of 2008
- List of UK Independent Singles Chart number ones of 2008
- List of UK Rock & Metal Singles Chart number ones of 2008
- List of UK R&B Singles Chart number ones of 2008
