= The Tour That Doesn't Tour Tour...Now On Tour =

2010-2011 comedy tour by Peter Kay

- Tour by Peter Kay
- Location: United Kingdom; Ireland
- Start date: 27 April 2010
- End date: 22 October 2011
- No. of shows: 122 (98 in England, 14 in Ireland, 5 in Scotland, 5 in Wales)

The Tour That Didn't Tour Tour...Now On Tour was a comedy tour by English stand-up comedian Peter Kay. Announced in November 2009, Kay said he would be playing four dates at Manchester Arena, which was later extended to 20 nights in April and May 2010, with a tour entitled The Tour That Doesn't Tour Tour. The reason Kay was restricting the tour to Manchester was so he could be close to his family. During an interview with Jonathan Ross, Kay announced that due to high demand for tickets, he would extend and rename it to The Tour That Doesn't Tour Tour...Now On Tour, taking place in November 2010 and April 2011. The tour was staged at the Manchester Arena, The O2 Arena, London, The O2 Arena, Dublin, The Odyssey Arena, Belfast, Cardiff International Arena, SECC, Glasgow, the Sheffield Arena, the Resorts World Arena, Birmingham, the Utilita Arena Newcastle, and the Liverpool Arena before returning to Manchester.

Singer Rick Astley appeared as a warm-up act in all April and May 2010 dates of the tour, performing various hits including his own.

All shows at the Manchester Arena completely sold out with over 750,000 tickets sold.

On 4 November 2010, extra shows were announced for London, Manchester and Birmingham. It was announced on 12 November that a sixth show was to be added to the O2 in Dublin, with all proceeds going to the Irish Autism Action. Extra shows were added for Belfast, Sheffield, Nottingham, Newcastle and London on 24 November.

The tour was listed in the Guinness World Records for the highest selling stand up comedy tour of all time with 1.2 million tickets sold.

== Records ==
- Longest individual run at the Manchester Arena performing 20 nights.
- First ever stand-up comedian to play 15 sold out nights at The O2, London.
- The only British artist to ever play 20 consecutive nights at an arena.
- Over one million tickets sold in arenas across the UK and Ireland, making it the biggest stand-up comedy tour in the world.

== Number of shows ==
- Manchester – Manchester Arena – 40 Shows – Most consecutive nights at venue with 20.
- London – O2 Arena – 15 Shows – Most show by a comedian at venue.
- Dublin – O2 – 6 Shows – Most show by a comedian, most consecutive show by a single artist at venue.
- Birmingham – LG Arena/NIA – 10 Shows, 5 in LG Arena & 5 in NIA
- Belfast – Odyssey Arena – 8 shows
- Cardiff – International Arena – 5 Shows
- Liverpool – Echo Arena – 5 Shows
- Glasgow – SECC – 5 Shows
- Newcastle – Metro Radio Arena – 8 Shows
- Nottingham – Trent FM Arena – 3 Shows
- Sheffield – Motorpoint Arena – 8 Shows
