= Peter Kay's Comedy Shuffle =

British TV series (2016–2020)

- Genre: Comedy compilation
- Starring: Peter Kay
- Opening theme: "Once Upon a Christmas Song" (instrumental)
- Composer: Jim Jayawardena
- Country of origin: United Kingdom
- Original language: English
- No. of series: 4 + 1 stand-alone series
- No. of episodes: 28

Production
- Producers: Ted Irons; Margaret Mubarek
- Editor: Matt Brown
- Running time: 30 minutes (regular series) 40 minutes (Christmas Special)
- Production company: Goodnight Vienna Productions

Original release
- Network: BBC One
- Release: 18 April 2016 – 18 September 2020

Peter Kay's Comedy Shuffle is a BBC comedy series produced by Goodnight Vienna Productions featuring clips taken from various television appearances of Peter Kay. It is broadcast on BBC One. A fourth series began on 27 March 2020.

== Episodes ==
=== Series 1 (2016) ===
No. overall	No. in series	Title	Original release date	UK viewers (million)
1	1	"Episode 1"	18 April 2016	5.61
This episode catches up with full-time diva Geraldine McQueen, visits the grand reopening of the Phoenix Club and Peter plays some unforgettable misheard song lyrics.
2	2	"Episode 2"	25 April 2016	5.16
This episode includes Peter's thoughts on dipping biscuits, embarrassing bodies, and how he is still struggling to find his way to Amarillo.
3	3	"Episode 3"	2 May 2016	4.26
This episode sees Peter talking dogs on This Morning, some classic Car Share outtakes and a horse on the loose down at the Phoenix Club.
4	4	"Episode 4"	9 May 2016	4.22
This episode features the spoof documentary The Ice Cream Man Cometh and Kay chatting with Alan Carr. Brian Potter and Andy Pipkin sing "500 Miles" accompanied by a star-studded cast.
5	5	"Episode 5"	16 May 2016	4.08
Peter takes a look back at school holidays as a child, it is singles night at the Phoenix Club, and Geraldine McQueen meets Sir Paul McCartney.
6	6	"Episode 6"	23 May 2016	3.71
Peter takes a look back at an appearance with Catherine Tate's Nan and talks family weddings. Plus an appearance by Max and Paddy, who just cannot seem to get it right.
7	7	"Peter Kay's Christmas Comedy Shuffle"	24 December 2016	4.28
Peter Kay returns with a special Christmas Comedy Shuffle, featuring festive favourites from Car Share, Phoenix Nights and a seasonal singalong with Sir Paul McCartney.

=== Series 2 (2017) ===
No. overall	No. in series	Title	Original release date	UK viewers (million)
8	1	"Episode 1"	23 June 2017	8.88
Peter Kay is back with a celebration of his finest and funniest moments from the last 20 years. With an appearance from Sir Trevor McDonald.
9	2	"Episode 2"	30 June 2017	7.64
Peter makes his first appearance on Irish television and discusses his school reunion. There is trouble down at the Phoenix Club when Stars In Their Eyes is cancelled. With a special appearance from Sir Elton John.
10	3	"Episode 3"	7 July 2017	5.86
Peter embarks on an ambitious nationwide challenge for Comic Relief and discusses his involvement in an armed raid with Michael Parkinson.
11	4	"Episode 4"	14 July 2017	4.96
A celebration of Peter Kay's funniest moments. Peter shines a light on dieting, John and Kayleigh are in tears and snooker champion Dennis Taylor makes a special appearance.
12	5	"Episode 5"	21 July 2017	3.93
Peter and Brian Potter both receive mysterious phone calls, while John and Kayleigh discuss naturists on their car-share home. Plus classic Kay featuring an appearance from Amy Winehouse.
13	6	"Episode 6"	28 July 2017	3.62
There is a dead body at the Phoenix Club, John and Kayleigh have an uninvited passenger and Peter wows an audience of 15,000 with his shovel. Featuring a special appearance from Queen.

=== Series 3 (2018) ===
No. overall	No. in series	Title	Original release date	UK viewers (million)
14	1	"Episode 1"	15 October 2018	5.95
One of Britain's best-loved comedians returns with his views on garlic bread, plus Max and Paddy flatten a cow and it is talent night down at the Phoenix Club for Brian Potter.
15	2	"Episode 2"	22 October 2018	3.62
The celebration continues with Peter making a riotous appearance with Alan Carr, while Brian Potter is trapped on a stair lift, and there is a disturbance at a motorway services. Plus a guest appearance from Eddie the Eagle.
16	3	"Episode 3"	29 October 2018	5.85
In this edition, Peter receives a filthy phone call, Max and Paddy get flashed by a speed camera and there is a funeral for John and Kayleigh. With a special appearance from Sandra Bullock.
17	4	"Episode 4"	5 November 2018	6.05
The celebration of over 20 years of Peter Kay continues with a rare appearance from Michael Jackson and some brand new bloopers from Car Share.
18	5	"Episode 5"	12 November 2018	5.72
Max and Paddy are sent to prison. Peter performs karaoke in Las Vegas, and the late Jim Bowen struggles to speak. Featuring very special appearances from Elizabeth IIHer Majesty the Queen and Spongebob Squarepants.
19	6	"Episode 6"	19 November 2018	4.84
Our celebration of one of Britain's favourite comedians comes to end with a quiz night down at the Phoenix Club, a triumphant victory for Geraldine McQueen and Max and Paddy have a singalong with some bewildered Asian Elders.

=== Series 4 (2020) ===
No. overall	No. in series	Title	Original release date	UK viewers (million)
20	1	"Episode 1"	27 March 2020	7.25
A further collection of clips documenting the much-loved comedy star's best work from his decades in showbusiness. Featuring a special appearance by The One Show's Alex Jones.
21	2	"Episode 2"	3 April 2020	8.24
Peter makes another erratic appearance on Jonathan Ross's show, while there's special appearances from Sheridan Smith and The Script. Meanwhile characters Max and Paddy dress up as sailors in an effort to meet some ladies.
22	3	"Episode 3"	10 April 2020	7.04
Peter voices his concerns about the environment, it's Robot Wars down at the Phoenix Club and there's a very special appearance from Alan Partridge.
23	4	"Episode 4"	17 April 2020	8.20
More clips from Kay's Career including a special appearance from rock legend Noddy Holder.
24	5	"Episode 5"	24 April 2020	4.10
The celebration of over 20 years of Peter Kay continues with a special appearance from Paddy McGuinness, whilst Peter sings on an Irish chat show.
25	6	"Peter Kay's Musical Comedy Shuffle"	1 May 2020	9.66
Series celebrating comedian, actor, writer and director Peter Kay's funniest work. With a special appearance from Chris Whitty.

=== Peter Kay's Stand-Up Comedy Shuffle (2020) ===
No. overall	No. in series	Title	Original release date	UK viewers (million)
26	1	"Episode 1"	4 September 2020	3.70
Join one of Bolton’s funniest stand-up comedians for his finest moments from the last 25 years.
27	2	"Episode 2"	11 September 2020	3.46
The Guinness world record-breaking stand-up comedian is back with more classic routines.
28	3	"Episode 3"	18 September 2020	3.87
More classic stand-up from the worlds biggest-selling stand-up comedian.

== Home media ==
The series "Comedy Shuffle" hasn't been released on DVD, however, an unrelated compilation DVD entitled "Peter Kay's Special Kay" was released on 17 November 2008.
