= & Then Boom =

Studio album by Iglu & Hartly
- Released: September 29, 2008
- Recorded: 2007
- Genre: Power pop, pop, hip hop
- Length: 44:43
- Label: Mercury
- Producer: Jarvis Anderson, Mark Needham

Singles from & Then Boom
- 1. "In This City" Released: September 14, 2008; 2. "Violent and Young" Released: December 4, 2008

& Then Boom is the debut studio album by American new wave band Iglu & Hartly. It was released on September 29, 2008.

== Critical reception ==
Professional ratings
Aggregate scores
Source	Rating
Metacritic	42/100
Review scores
Source	Rating
DIY	1/10
Drowned in Sound	0/10
Entertainment.ie	2/5 stars
The Guardian	3/5 stars
Hot Press	3/5
The Line of Best Fit	75%
NME	2/10
musicOMH	2/5 stars
The Observer	2/5 stars
Q	3/5 stars

Reviews of & Then Boom upon release were mixed. As of March 2015, the album holds an aggregated score of a 42 out of 100, indicating "mixed or average reviews", based on six sources. Allmusic journalist Anthony Tognazzini described & Then Boom as "fizzy, fun retro-glam-electro-pop from beginning to end", also noting the variety of the sounds on the record. There were three-star reviews from the Hot Press and Q, with the former's Edwin McFee calling it a "guilty pleasure" and latter calling it a "kitchen-sink hybrid" that "works remarkably well". Caroline Sullivan of The Guardian gave the album a similar score, praising it as "crisp electro-rock with a big hook in every tune, and lyrics that present them as a bunch of civic-minded young fellows".

However, in more varied reviews, The Guardian's sister paper The Observer, Craig McLean opined that "On the one hand, it's riotously good fun; on the other, it's a bit naff." Shaun Newport, writing for musicOMH, called it a "frustration and disappointment" to listen to, saying that the group "sound nice, look nice but you'd be pressed to find any substance." However, he did give them credit for "absolutely signif[ying] the beginning of the end of our love affair with the '80s. It was cool, then it was pop and now it has shamelessly gone too far. Thank goodness we always have time to learn from our mistakes." Entertainment.ie's Lauren Murphy called most of the rapping "cringeworthy", with her overall verdict of the album describing it as "two different, disjointed and discordant bands - neither with any direction, and both offering only minimal splashes of fun".

There were extremely negative reviews that questioned if BBC Radio 1's promotion of Iglu & Hartly was a joke, as well as criticized the record's cheap and unprofessional-sounding production and songwriting. It got a zero-out-of-ten review from David Renshaw of Drowned in Sound, calling it "the worst album of [2008]." Racheal Crowther, a critic for DIY, rated it a one out of ten, writing that the tracks were "so similar it feels like listening to one really long song rather than an album". In a two-out-of-ten review from NME, Rick Martin called it "an abomination of a debut album, informed by all the most disgusting musical faux pas of the past 20 years." Jarvis Anderson responded to this negative critical reception in an interview; "Reviews are interesting, I'll take negative criticism if someone explains why. We laugh hard at some of them – we take it with a light heart. I certainly haven't really read a negative review that's changed my mind about anything. If anyone's got an opinion maybe I'll use it if it's good, I'm not that stubborn."

== Track listing ==
All songs written and composed by Iglu & Hartly

No.	Title	Length
1.	"Believe"	3:49
2.	"Violent and Young"	4:23
3.	"Tomorrow"	3:38
4.	"Build"	4:15
5.	"DayGlo"	2:58
6.	"In This City"	4:05
7.	"People"	3:46
8.	"Whatever We Like"	4:42
9.	"We'll See"	4:09
10.	"Out There"	3:57
11.	"Jump Out of Your Car"	4:46

== Personnel ==
- Jarvis Anderson – vocals, keyboards
- Sam Martin – vocals, keyboards
- Simon Katz – guitar
- Luis Rosiles – drums
- Michael Bucher – bass

== Charts ==
Chart (2008)	Peak position
Irish Albums (IRMA)	92
Scottish Albums (OCC)	37
UK Albums (OCC)	36
