= Lab Rats (British TV series) =

- Cartoon-style title screen of Lab Rats
- Genre: Sitcom
- Written by: Chris Addison; Carl Cooper
- Directed by: Adam Tandy
- Starring: Chris Addison; Selina Cadell; Jo Enright; Geoffrey McGivern; Dan Tetsell; Margaret Cabourn-Smith
- Country of origin: United Kingdom
- Original language: English
- No. of series: 1
- No. of episodes: 6

Production
- Executive producers: Armando Iannucci; Ali Bryer Carron
- Producer: Simon Nicholls
- Camera setup: Multi-camera
- Running time: 29 minutes

Original release
- Network: BBC Two
- Release: 10 July – 14 August 2008

Lab Rats is a 2008 BBC Two sitcom set in a university science laboratory starring Chris Addison, who co-wrote the series with Carl Cooper. The series was produced by regular collaborator Simon Nicholls and directed by Adam Tandy. Its executive producer was Armando Iannucci with whom Addison worked in The Thick of It.

Iannucci stated that the programme would be a traditional-style sitcom recorded in front of a live audience. He hinted that it will be a "very cartoony" show featuring "lots of giant snails".

A pilot was announced as part of a series called Behind Closed Door in autumn 2006, but was never broadcast. A series of six episodes was broadcast in 2008. The show was not recommissioned for further series.

== Setting ==
Lab Rats is set in the Arnolfini, a research lab (and staff) for hire in St. Dunstan's University, designed to make money for the university by carrying out research on behalf of other people.

== Characters ==
- Doctor Alex Beenyman (Chris Addison): The unofficial head of the lab, Dr Beenyman does his best to keep the others in control. He is the only sane member of the team but often ends up responsible for their actions.
- Professor John Mycroft (Geoffrey McGivern): Officially in charge, Prof. Mycroft once won a Nobel Prize and has been living off it ever since. Spends a lot of his time drinking.
- Cara McIlvenny (Jo Enright): A 4-foot-11-inch (150 cm) lab assistant who's not always altogether 'there'. Although she has a talent for building machines, she does not appear to have much actual understanding of science, or of anything else. She is probably Alex's best friend within the lab.
- Brian Lalumaca (Dan Tetsell): A rather unpleasant lab assistant, who enjoys weapons, traps, and anything else violent. He often finds himself involved in Prof. Mycroft's mad schemes. He harbours something of a crush on the Dean, but is constantly frustrated by her inability to remember his name or role.
- Minty Clapper (Helen Moon): Secretary to Prof. Mycroft and Dr Beenyman.
- Dean Mieke Miedema (Selina Cadell): The Dean of St Dunstan's College. Dutch.
- The Secretary (Margaret Cabourn-Smith) who is constantly being given onerous tasks by the Dean. She has very few spoken lines but is involved in various visual gags throughout the series.

== Episodes ==
Th series premiered on BBC Two on 10 July 2008.

No.	Title	Directed by	Original release date
1	"A Snail"	Adam Tandy	10 July 2008
A maverick Russian professor asks the laboratory to solve his human cloning problem in 24 hours.
2	"A Donor"	Adam Tandy	17 July 2008
A lab inspector turns up and causes havoc. The scientists must also keep a secret from him —- they have a donor locked up in a cryogenic unit. With Robin Ince as Sir Andrew Chother.
3	"A Protest"	Adam Tandy	24 July 2008
A protest against nothing in particular is held outside the laboratory.
4	"A Bee"	Adam Tandy	31 July 2008
A friend of Professor Mycroft loses his prize test super bees.
5	"A Seven-Nighter"	Adam Tandy	7 August 2008
The team have a special overnight job in a secret government lab for 7 long nights.
6	"A Diary"	Adam Tandy	14 August 2008
Alex's father finds the teenage diary of Captain Scott and the lab is hit by freak weather conditions.

== Reception ==
Reception to the first episode "A Snail" was mixed in the British press. The Guardian Guide found the programme "mundane and dated", Lucy Mangan also of The Guardian said "the kind of stuff that would barely have passed muster in the 70s [...] all the jokes are spatchcocked into a wafer-thin plot that veers uncertainly between reality and surreality, this particular experiment can only be deemed a failure.". Tim Teeman writing in The Times said "Lab Rats is a truly appalling new sit-com [...] Bad puns, redundant characters, lame jokes [...] Not even the best surgeon in the land could save this." (0/5 stars)

However Robert Hanks in The Independent said "remarkable for its combination of very silly jokes and rather well-researched evolutionary theory. The cast is good. The plot of last night's episode was pleasantly absurdist, the jokes were commendably odd and wide-ranging [...] Somehow, though, it didn't quite gel, largely because of the studio audience, whose laughter, as so often, slowed things down and underlined jokes that needed to be thrown away [...] Worth giving it a week or two, though." Robert Collins of The Daily Telegraph gave it his critic's choice, calling it "likeable, madcap comedy [...] a catalytic reaction of Red Dwarf and The IT Crowd, in a solution of Are You Being Served? And it's not a bad formula."

Visitors to the British Comedy Guide website voted Lab Rats as the "Worst New British TV Sitcom" of 2008 in its annual awards, with the website saying that: "The idea behind the show may have been good (to bring back silly studio-based sitcom to the BBC), but the execution was anything but good. An awful, awful comedy."
