= The Sound of Laughter =

2006 book by Peter Kay

- Author: Peter Kay
- Language: English
- Genre: Autobiography
- Publication date: 5 October 2006
- Publication place: United Kingdom

The Sound of Laughter was British comedian Peter Kay's initial volume of autobiography, released on 5 October 2006. The book was a bestseller.

The Sound of Laughter was a success with 278,000 copies sold in its first day (including pre-orders). It went straight in at Number 1 on both the Play.com and Amazon.co.uk book charts and was the Number 1 highest selling autobiography in the UK.

== Cover ==
The cover of the book features Kay's head on Julie Andrews' body from The Sound of Music. The raised effect on the head is supposed to look as if it has been cut out and stuck on, which ties in with the homely feel of the book.

== Promotion ==
Kay has only done one promotional appearance for the book on The Paul O'Grady Show. On the show, Kay came on dressed as a nun, with a mask of his face over his ordinary face - a parody of the cover of the book. In the interview he criticised Billy Connolly's biography, Billy, as well as making numerous jokes about his education by nuns. He said he had many nuns teaching him:

- Sister Sledge
- Sister Scissors
- Sister Act 2
- Sister Matic
- Sister Zar Doin-it
- Sister Swingout
- Sister O'Mercy

He added that every year, he sent a Valentine's card to each nun from Jesus.

== Follow up book ==
It was announced by Kay at Jason Manford's stand-up gig in Salford, that he would be releasing another book to follow on from The Sound of Laughter. This was later confirmed by Random House and Saturday Night Peter was released in Autumn 2009.
