= Soap Fever =

British TV series (1998–2002)

- Presented by: Fiona Phillips
- Country of origin: United Kingdom
- Original language: English
- No. of episodes: 167

Production
- Running time: 60 minutes
- Production company: Granada Television

Original release
- Network: ITV2
- Release: 8 December 1998 – 17 February 2002

Soap Fever is a British television Entertainment programme on ITV2 presented by Liza Tarbuck, Denise Welch, Emma Kennedy, Jenny Powell and Jordan Haslam towards the end of its run Fiona Phillips and Penny Smith.

Each week the show would feature soap recaps and previews, news, competitions plus each week an exclusive interview with a top soap star or stars.

The show was broadcast on Sunday nights usually at 6:30pm (6:00pm towards the end of its run) from 8 December 1998 to 17 February 2002. It was written by Karl Lucas who also co-starred on the show and presented features. Regular on screen contribution came in the form of audience 'plants' who asked questions to celebrity guests, and also interacted with the programme hosts. Three of the long serving audience members were Gareth Davis, Norman Booth and Pam Morgan.
