= Jo Enright =

Actress

- Occupation(s): Actress, Stand-up comedian
- Years active: 1995–present
- Television: Lab Rats (2008); Ideal (2009–2011); Life's Too Short (2011–2013); Trollied (2012); The Job Lot (2013–2015)

Jo Enright is an English stand-up comedian and actress who has appeared in a number of television and radio comedy programmes. She is best known for her roles in The Job Lot, Life's Too Short and Trollied.

== Career ==
In 1995, Enright made her Edinburgh Festival debut as part of the three-hander The West Midland's Serious Comedy Squad. In 2002, she appeared alongside Steve Coogan in episode five, series two of the BBC comedy I'm Alan Partridge as a tax inspector investigating Alan. In 2005, she appeared in the BBC Radio 4 series The Ape that Got Lucky with Chris Addison. In 2006, she appeared in the comedy series Time Trumpet on BBC Two, playing herself as a commentator in the year 2031 looking back on the world nearly thirty years before. From July 2008, she appeared in the BBC comedy series Lab Rats as Cara McIlvenny.

In 2008, Enright played wheelchair-user Jackie, a member of the fictional "2 Up, 2 Down", on Peter Kay's Britain's Got the Pop Factor... and Possibly a New Celebrity Jesus Christ Soapstar Superstar Strictly on Ice, a spoof on the talent show genre of programmes. In 2009 she began playing "Carol" in the fifth and sixth series of the BBC Three sitcom Ideal. In 2011, Enright appeared in Ricky Gervais's and Stephen Merchant's television comedy series Life's Too Short as Sue, Warwick Davis's estranged wife. In 2012, she appeared as baker Sharon in the Sky1 sitcom Trollied. From April 2013 until November 2015, Enright appeared as officious job centre worker Angela Bromford in the ITV2 comedy series The Job Lot. In 2022, Enright appeared in a guest role as Vera, the swinger, in series 3 of Ricky Gervais' After Life.

== Awards ==
- 2002: Chortle Award winner for best female circuit comic
- 2001: Best Female on the Jongleurs Comedy Circuit, sponsored by Bodyform
- 1996: Named comedian of the year at the Leicester Comedy Festival

== Filmography ==
- After Life as Vera; Series 3 episode 2; uncredited
- Porters (2017, 2019) as Janice Grimm
- Nurse (2015) as Bernie
- The Job Lot (2013–2015) as Angela Bromford
- Trollied (2012) as Sharon the Baker
- Life's Too Short (2011–2013) as Sue
- Ideal (2009–2011) as Carol
- Lab Rats (2008) as Cara McIlvenny
- Britain's Got the Pop Factor... and Possibly a New Celebrity Jesus Christ Soapstar Superstar Strictly on Ice (2008) as Jackie from contestants "2 Up 2 Down"
- Time Trumpet (2006) as herself (in an imagined future)
- Brain Candy (BBC) - (2003) as herself
- Round (2003) as Ann
- I'm Alan Partridge - I Know What Alan Did Last Summer (2002) as Tax Inspector Catherine
- World of Pub - Ladies (2001)
- Phoenix Nights (aka Peter Kay's Phoenix Nights) - Episode #1.4 (2001) as Beverly Hillscoptu
- That Peter Kay Thing - The Arena (1999)
- I Love a 1970's Christmas (2000) as herself
- Barking (1998), Channel 4 sketch show, as writer and performer

She has also provided voice-overs in advertisements for Jaffa Cakes, Living TV, Sainsburys and Nescafe.
