= Iglu & Hartly =

Electropop band

- Origin: Los Angeles, California, United States
- Genres: Electropop, pop rock, electronic rock, new wave
- Years active: 2006–2011; 2019–present
- Labels: Mercury
- Members: Jarvis Anderson; Luis Rosiles; Michael Bucher
- Past members: Dave Bantz; Sam Martin; Simon Katz
- Website: igluandhartlymusic.com

Iglu & Hartly is an American pop rock band from Los Angeles, California. The band is composed of Jarvis Anderson (vocals, keyboards), Luis Rosiles (drums), and Michael Bucher (bass).

== History ==
Jarvis Anderson, Sam Martin, and Simon Katz met at the University of Colorado at Boulder. Before long, the 3 of them left school and moved to Echo Park, California to pursue a career in music. Shortly after moving to Los Angeles, Luis Rosiles flew from Jarvis' hometown of Park Ridge, Illinois to join the band as their drummer, and LA local Michael Bucher joined as bassist.

After two years of playing in Southern California clubs, the band signed with Mercury Records and released their debut UK single "Violent & Young" on indie label Another Music = Another Kitchen on June 2, 2008.

The band's next single "In This City" was released in September 2008. The band toured around the release of the song, playing over 120 shows in a span of 150 days in 17 countries. "In This City" became a success across Europe, peaking within the top ten of the charts in Belgium (Flanders), the Republic of Ireland, and the United Kingdom. In the latter country, Iglu & Hartley performed "In This City" on the (then) BBC One talk show Friday Night with Jonathan Ross, helping the song peak at number five on the UK Singles Chart, securing the band their first and only top ten hit in Britain. An instrumental version of the song was also used as the theme tune for the "Goal of the Month" competitions on the BBC One sports show Match of the Day.

On May 5, 2009 their CD "& Then Boom" was released in the United States. At SXSW in Austin, Iglu & Hartly's Jarvis Anderson was arrested in the early hours of March 19 after allegedly assaulting a hotel security guard while half naked.

In 2011, it was announced by various members through their respective Twitter and Facebook pages that Iglu & Hartly is on "hiatus" with no plans for a second record. Anderson announced through his Twitter page that he is going "solo." Martin and Katz, the other founding members of the band, started a new project called Youngblood Hawke.

On July 15, 2019, the band announced a one-time reunion at Hermosa Beach Summer Series, occurring in August. In December 2020, the band returned with a new song, ‘Cooler’, while in 2021 Sam Martin released a solo single called ‘Patience’ under the name Sunshine Boysclub. The band toured in the UK in 2023. They released a new EP called "Money" in 2023.

== Band members ==
Current members

- Jarvis Anderson – vocals, keyboards (2006-2011-2019-)
- Michael Bucher – bass (2008–2011-2019-)
- Luis Rosiles – drums (2006–2011-2019-)

Former members

- Dave Bantz – vocals (2006–2007)
- Simon Katz – guitar (2006–2011)
- Sam Martin – vocals, keyboards (2006–2011)

== Discography ==
=== Studio albums ===
Date of Release	Title	Label
29 September 2008	& Then Boom	Mercury Records

=== Singles ===
- "Violent and Young" (2008)
- "In This City" (2008) - UK #5, Ireland #9, Europe #33, US Billboard Modern Rock #35, BPI: Silver
- "Dedication" (2009)
