= In This City =

2008 single by Iglu & Hartly (New Zealand band)

Single by Iglu & Hartly

from the album & Then Boom
- Released: September 15, 2008
- Recorded: 2008
- Genre: Pop
- Label: Mercury Records
- Songwriter: Iglu and Hartly

Iglu and Hartly singles chronology
| ""Violent and Young"" | "In This City" (2008) |

"In This City"

"In This City" is a song by American band Iglu & Hartly. The song is taken from their first album & Then Boom (2008). "In This City" peaked at number thirty-five on the Billboard Alternative Songs chart. Outside of the United States, the song peaked within the top ten of the charts in Belgium (Flanders), the Republic of Ireland, and the United Kingdom. It is so far their only hit, thus making them a one-hit wonder.

== Release and reception ==
The music magazine NME gave the song 8/10 and commented that it has a great chorus and "a joyful pop song". Popjustice made it their 'song of the day', saying "The band specialise in really smart synthy pop tunes with rapping in and when the choruses are this massive it's hard not to become slightly obsessed".

The song was added to the upfront section of the playlist of BBC Radio 1 in the United Kingdom in August 2008 and the A-List the subsequent month.

== Chart performance ==
In the United Kingdom, "In This City" debuted at number 80 on the UK Singles Chart on September 7, 2008 – for the week ending date September 13, 2008 – solely on downloads, and went on to peak at number five on the chart on September 28, 2008 – for the week ending date October 4, 2008 – becoming Iglu & Hartley's first and only top ten song in Britain. In Ireland, the song peaked at number nine on the Irish Singles Chart.

=== Weekly charts ===
| Chart (2008–2009) | Peak position |
|---|---|
| Belgium (Ultratip Bubbling Under Flanders) | 9 |
| Belgium (Ultratip Bubbling Under Wallonia) | 19 |
| Czech Republic Airplay (ČNS IFPI) | 25 |
| Euro Digital Song Sales (Billboard) | 9 |
| Ireland (IRMA) | 9 |
| Japan Hot 100 (Billboard) | 85 |
| Netherlands (Single Top 100) | 80 |
| UK Singles (OCC) | 5 |
| US Alternative Airplay (Billboard) | 35 |

=== Year-end charts ===
| Chart (2008) | Position |
|---|---|
| UK Singles (OCC) | 88 |

== Certifications ==
| Region | Certification | Certified units/sales |
|---|---|---|
| United Kingdom (BPI) | Silver | 200,000^{‡} |
^{‡} Sales+streaming figures based on certification alone.
