= Once Upon a Christmas Song =

2008 single by Peter Kay

Single by Geraldine McQueen (Peter Kay)
- Released: 5 December 2008 (Europe)
- Recorded: November 2008
- Genre: Parody, Christmas
- Songwriters: Peter Kay and Gary Barlow

Peter Kay singles chronology
"The Winner's Song" (2008)	"Once Upon a Christmas Song" (2008)	"The Official BBC Children in Need Medley" (2009)

"Once Upon a Christmas Song" is a Christmas single, and the second single to be released by fictional character Geraldine McQueen. It was co-written by Gary Barlow and Peter Kay who plays the character, originating from a parody talent show called Britain's Got the Pop Factor.... The song was a major success, reaching number 5 in the Official Charts for the United Kingdom. The CD was released on 15 December 2008, with the download available a day earlier and the proceeds going to the NSPCC, a British charity working and campaigning on child protection. In 2016, an instrumental version of the song served as the theme tune to BBC One's compilation series Peter Kay's Comedy Shuffle.

== Video ==
The video for "Once Upon A Christmas Song" features Geraldine (Peter Kay), on a float singing to the public and ends with her lighting up a street with Christmas decorations. Also, Jackie (Jo Enright) and Wendy (Sian Foulkes) from fellow Britain's Got the Pop Factor finalists 2 Up 2 Down feature. ITV News Granada presenter and reporter Lucy Meacock, from the North West ITV regional news programme Granada Reports/Granada Tonight, makes a speaking cameo as herself. The video was filmed around streets in Bolton and Salford, Greater Manchester, with the Christmas lights scenes filmed in Mossfield Court, Halliwell.

== Track listing ==
For the CD release of Once Upon A Christmas Song, tracks featured are;

1. Once Upon A Christmas Song
2. The Winners Song
3. Geraldine's Medley

== Charts ==
=== Weekly charts ===
Chart (2008)	Peak position
Ireland (IRMA)	35
Scotland Singles (OCC)	2
UK Singles (OCC)	5

=== Year-end charts ===
Chart (2008)	Position
UK Singles (Official Charts Company)	129
