= The Winners Song =

Single by Geraldine McQueen (Peter Kay)
- Released: 13 October 2008
- Genre: Parody
- Label: Polydor
- Songwriters: Peter Kay, Gary Barlow

Peter Kay singles chronology
"(I'm Gonna Be) 500 Miles" (2007)	"The Winners Song" (2008)	"Once Upon a Christmas Song" (2008)

"The Winners Song" is a single by fictional character Geraldine McQueen from Peter's Kay's Britain's Got the Pop Factor... and Possibly a New Celebrity Jesus Christ Soapstar Superstar Strictly on Ice, a spoof talent contest/comedy by British comedian Peter Kay, who also plays Geraldine. It was released in Europe on 13 October 2008 and reached number two on the UK Singles Chart. It also reached number one in Scotland in June 2009.

The song was co-written by Kay together with Gary Barlow from Take That, and parodies the style of changing key part-way through a song - a popular trick of modern-day pop songs - starting out in A flat major, moving up to B flat major, and then quickly up to B major.

== Video ==
The video to the song was released both as a DVD single and as part of the Peter Kay compilation "Special Kay",

=== Parody ===
The video itself is a parody of Leona Lewis' video for her cover of Kelly Clarkson's, "A Moment Like This", and the box art of the single is a parody of The Meaning of Love, the debut album from Michelle McManus, who won the second series of Pop Idol in 2003.

== Track listing ==
1. "The Winners Song"
2. "The Winners Song" (2 Up, 2 Down Version)

== Chart performance ==
In the United Kingdom, the song debuted at number two, beating "Don't Call This Love" by Leon Jackson, the winner of the 2007 series of The X Factor, but was not to dislodge Pink's "So What" from the top spot. In Scotland, the opposite occurred: it was beaten to the top by "Don't Call This Love" and charted one position ahead of "So What". The song remained on the Scottish Singles Chart for the rest of 2008 and during the first half of 2009, finally reaching the number-one spot on 14 June 2009. Overall, the song spent almost a full consecutive year on the Scottish Singles Chart, making its last chart appearance on 4 October 2009, before leaving the top 100.

=== Weekly charts ===
Chart (2008–2009)	Peak position
Europe (Eurochart Hot 100)	9
Scotland Singles (OCC)	1
UK Singles (OCC)	2

=== Year-end charts ===
Chart (2008)	Position
UK Singles (OCC)	117
