= Britain's Got the Pop Factor... and Possibly a New Celebrity Jesus Christ Soapstar Superstar Strictly on Ice =

British television comedy show

- Genre: Entertainment; Parody; Reality; Talent show
- Created by: Peter Kay
- Developed by: Peter Kay; Paul Coleman; Karl Lucas
- Written by: Peter Kay; Paul Coleman
- Directed by: Peter Kay
- Presented by: Cat Deeley
- Starring: Peter Kay; Jo Enright; Karl Lucas; Marc Pickering; David Hulston; Sian Foulkes
- Judges: Neil Fox; Pete Waterman; Nicki Chapman
- Country of origin: United Kingdom
- Original language: English
- No. of episodes: 1

Production
- Executive producers: Peter Kay; Phil McIntyre; Martin Riley
- Cinematography: Jeremy Hewson
- Editors: Peter Hallworth; Ricky Wild
- Running time: 120 minutes (75 + 45 minutes)

Original release
- Network: Channel 4
- Release: 12 October 2008

Related
- Max and Paddy's Road to Nowhere; Geraldine: The Winner's Story

Britain's Got the Pop Factor... and Possibly a New Celebrity Jesus Christ Soapstar Superstar Strictly on Ice is a British television comedy special co-created, co-written, directed, produced by and starring comedian Peter Kay. It premiered on Channel 4 on 12 October 2008 in two parts.

The special is a satire of reality television, and particularly, talent competitions such as Britain's Got Talent, Pop Idol, and The X Factor. It is presented as the grand final of the in-universe programme Britain's Got the Pop Factor, using recaps to chronicle the three finalists—Geraldine McQueen (Kay), 2 Up 2 Down (Jo Enright, Karl Lucas, David Hulston and Sian Foulkes), and R Wayne (Marc Pickering). The special satirizes clichés associated with the genre, such as the use of emotional backstories intended to influence viewers' perceptions of contestants.

It was the first show Kay had produced on the channel for four years, and was described by Channel 4 as the 'comedy forefront of the autumn schedule"'. The broadcast of the special also mimicked those of reality shows, with the two parts (the latter being the "results show") being hammocked by a Peter Kay documentary. The two halves of the special were seen by a total of 7.16 and 4.01 million viewers respectively, while Kay released several singles in-character as McQueen, including "The Winner's Song", and a cover of "I Know Him So Well" with Susan Boyle as a charity single for Red Nose Day 2011.

== Plot ==
The special depicts the grand final of the talent competition series Britain's Got the Pop Factor (whose winner qualifies to appear on Celebrity Jesus Christ Soapstar Superstar Strictly on Ice), hosted by Cat Deeley and judged by Nicki Chapman, Pete Waterman and Neil Fox.

The final included recaps of the series, including the acts who did not make it to the final, and the three finalists—revealing that their emotional "sob stories" were the driving force behind which contestants advanced to the finals. Geraldine McQueen (Kay) had gone through gender reassignment surgery after being a male piano player on a Northern Irish ferry. 2 Up 2 Down (Jo Enright, Karl Lucas, David Hulston and Sian Foulkes) was a pop group where two of its members used wheelchairs, while R Wayne (Marc Pickering) had been originally eliminated during boot camp for not having a good sob story. However, R Wayne was brought back onto the show after his grandmother, R Gran, died from a heart attack upon hearing news of his elimination.

The three finalists each performed a live medley (performed in a serious manner, with the insensitivity of the song selections providing the humour). At this point, R Wayne was eliminated and the final two acts then performed their own rendition of "The Winner's Song".

The winner of the show was Geraldine. She collapsed on stage during the last lines of her version of "The Winner's Song" from choking on a piece of glitter confetti. R Wayne, not noticing, ended up being the only person actually singing these last lines. After somebody asked for a doctor, Neil Fox jumped on stage and attempted to revive her.

The following day Kay, in character as Geraldine, was a guest on The Chris Moyles Show on BBC Radio 1 and revealed that Neil Fox revived her, and she was recovering in an unknown (to her) hospital. She also appeared on Danny Baker's afternoon radio show on BBC London 94.9 three days later where she was still in hospital recovering and she was hoping to get a visit from Pete Waterman. She was also interviewed on Wave 105's breakfast show the following Friday, where she revealed that she was staying at Guy Ritchie's flat. Notably, no TV interviews were done with Kay in character as Geraldine.

After the end credits, the show advertised its "sequel", due to be shown the next year: Celebrity Fiddler on the Roof in the Jungle, an amalgam of British reality show I'm a Celebrity, Get Me Out of Here and the musical Fiddler on the Roof.

An epilogue, Peter Kay's Britain's Got an Extra Pop Factor and Then Some 2 + 1, aired on 19 December 2008; this special parodied companion shows such as The Xtra Factor (and in particular its "The Winner's Story" edition), focusing on the aftermath of the competition and Geraldine's victory. The programme was hosted in-universe by Ben Shephard, who, like Cat Deeley, was closely associated with this type of programme.

== Music ==
R Wayne sang a medley of "Return to Innocence" by Enigma, "Love Train" by The O'Jays, "Earth Song" by Michael Jackson, "Y.M.C.A." by The Village People and "There's No-one Quite Like Grandma" by St Winifred's School Choir.

2 Up 2 Down sang a medley of "We Built This City" by Starship, "Bootylicious" by Destiny's Child, "9 to 5" by Dolly Parton, "Holding Out for a Hero" by Bonnie Tyler and "Hero" by Mariah Carey.

Geraldine sang a medley of "Born to Run" by Bruce Springsteen, the theme from "Born Free" by Matt Monro, "Free Nelson Mandela" by The Special AKA, "Umbrella" by Rihanna, "C'est la Vie" by B*Witched and "Milkshake" by Kelis.

Both 2 Up 2 Down and Geraldine sang versions of "The Winner's Song", which was co-written by the show's creator Peter Kay and Take That frontman Gary Barlow.

The music was produced and arranged by Mike Stevens, Take That's musical director.

== Cast ==
=== Main cast ===
- Peter Kay as Geraldine McQueen
- Cat Deeley as herself
- Nicki Chapman as herself
- Neil Fox as himself
- Pete Waterman as himself
- Marc Pickering as R Wayne
- Jo Enright as Jackie
- Karl Lucas as Richard
- Sian Foulkes as Wendy
- David Hulston as Graham
- Conleth Hill as Geraldine's Mum
- Alex Lowe as Clinton Baptiste
- Judith Alexander as R Mam
- Gordon Isaccs as Bouncer 1
- Dean Feasby as Bouncer 2
- Peter Dickson as Voiceover Man

=== Guest stars ===
- Rick Astley as himself
- Lionel Blair as Dance Mentor
- Todd Carty as Jesus H Christ
- The Cheeky Girls as Mentors
- Louis Emerick as Joseph
- Rustie Lee as Neil Fox's assistant
- Sally Lindsay as Mary
- Paul McCartney as Mentor/Himself
- Gary Newbon as himself
- Ricky Wilson as himself

=== Cast of auditionees ===
- Pearce Quigley as Dog Trainer
- Smug Roberts as Angry Husband
- Tim Whitnall as Auditionee with Eyepatch
- Bob Golding as Port
- Steve Royle as Baby Juggler
- Jordan Smith as boy who jumps on Cat Deeley
- Marc Silk as Martin Wallace
- Philip Owen as Disco Dave

== Reception ==
=== Viewership ===
On its initial broadcast, the first part of the programme attracted 6.25 million viewers on Channel 4 and 912,000 on Channel 4 +1, giving a total of 7.16 million viewers. The second part attracted 3.56 million viewers on Channel 4 and 454,000 on Channel 4 +1, giving a total of 4.01 million viewers.

The repeat showing of both parts combined on 14 December 2008 garnered 2.81 million viewers on Channel 4 and 389,000 on Channel 4 +1, giving a total of 3.20 million viewers.

=== Critical reception ===
Writing for The Guardian, Stephen Brook praised the special, writing that it "did not fall flat or over-reach itself", and was "so well produced that it looked and sounded exactly like The X Factor". He felt that Cat Deeley "trashing her nice girl image" by swearing at the audience was his favourite moment.

== Geraldine McQueen ==
Geraldine McQueen
- Born: Gerald King; Dungannon, Northern Ireland
- Genres: Pop
- Occupation: Singer
- Instruments: Vocals piano
- Years active: 2008–2011
- Label: Polydor

Gerald "Gerry" King aka Geraldine McQueen is the fictional singer-songwriter from Britain's Got The Pop Factor... played by Peter Kay as a parody of the generic talent show winner.

=== Backstory ===
Geraldine grew up as a male named Gerald King. As an adult, Gerald became a piano player on one of the Northern Irish ferries. Always believing that she was in the wrong body, Geraldine underwent a painful gender reassignment surgery in Bangkok under the watchful eyes of Dr Fungmewow, claiming, "he certainly knew his onions..." Her home life was poor though, as after her mother found a young Gerry cross-dressing, she stated that she didn't want anything to do with her son, saying "she is no son of mine!" However, during the final of Britain's Got The Pop Factor..., Geraldine's mother battled with her terminal HIV and inner-dislike for her child, but came to the studio on an IKEA flatbed trolley to support her. Geraldine's father died when she was younger.

=== Releases ===
The single "The Winner's Song" was written by Peter Kay and Gary Barlow; it was released on iTunes and in stores on 13 October 2008. On 19 October 2008, the song entered the UK Singles Chart at number 2. The follow-up single, "Once Upon a Christmas Song", was released on 15 December 2008 in stores and became available to download on 14 December. This was a charity single, and all proceeds were donated to the NSPCC.

When her Christmas single, "Once Upon a Christmas Song" was released, Geraldine made an appearance on GMTV to promote it, claiming it was a serious contender for the Christmas number 1 single. It reached Number 5 on the UK Singles Chart.

=== Other appearances ===
After the release of "The Winner's Song", Geraldine made appearances on Take That Comes To Town. She was then seen performing it on The Royal Variety Performance (doing a medley which included "The Winner's Song" and "Once Upon a Christmas Song"), and The Paul O'Grady Show. After nearly three years away, McQueen appeared on Daybreak, Loose Women and The One Show to promote her new single, a duet with Susan Boyle. The Geraldine: The Winner's Story mockumentary was re-edited for the first episode of the compilation series Peter Kay's Comedy Shuffle in 2016.

=== Discography ===
==== Singles ====
Year	Song	UK	SCO	IRL
2008	"The Winner's Song"	2	1	—
2008	"Once Upon a Christmas Song"	5	2	35
2011	"I Know Him So Well" (With Susan Boyle)	11	10	40
