= Peter Kay =

English actor and stand-up comedian (born 1973)

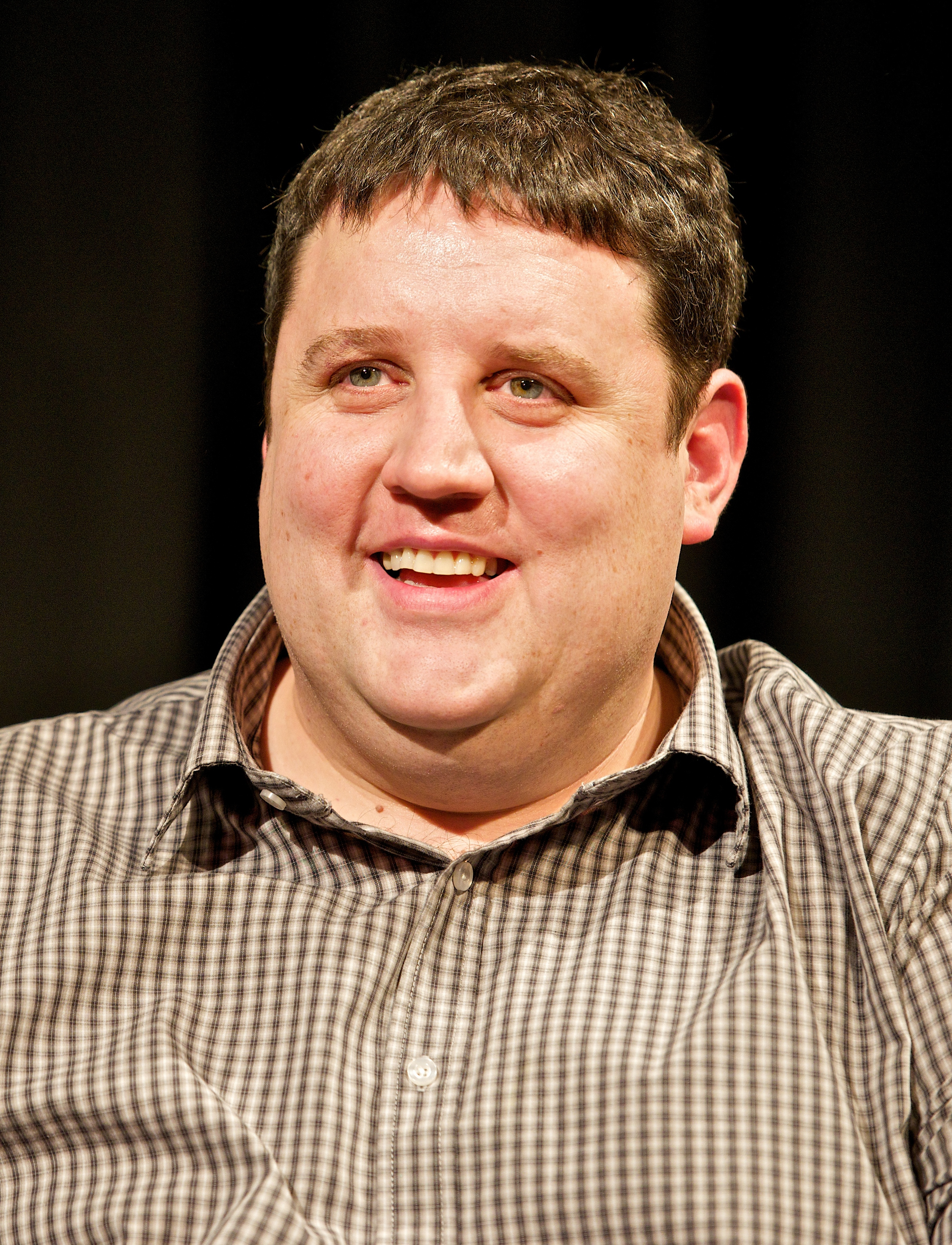
- Kay giving a comedy master class at the University of Salford in 2012
- Born: Peter John Kay; 2 July 1973 (age 53); Farnworth, Lancashire, England
- Education: University of Salford
- Spouse: Susan Gargan (m. 2001)

Comedy career
- Years active: 1996–present
- Medium: Stand-up; television; film; music
- Genres: Observational comedy; physical comedy; situational comedy; character comedy
- Subjects: Everyday life; British culture; pop culture; human behaviour; family; nostalgia

Peter John Kay (born 2 July 1973) is an English comedian, actor, writer, and producer. Known for his observational humour which often draws on everyday life and British culture, Kay is regarded as one of the UK’s most successful stand-up comedians, with several of his tours breaking attendance and ticket sales records. He has received a National Television Award, two British Academy Television Awards, and three British Comedy Awards.

Born and raised in Farnworth, Kay studied media performance at the University of Salford and later began working part-time as a stand-up comedian. In 1997, he won Channel 4's So You Think You're Funny contest, and the following year, he was nominated for a Perrier Award for his show at the Edinburgh Fringe Festival. With his public profile raised, Kay co-wrote and starred in the Channel 4 mockumentary series That Peter Kay Thing (2000). This resulted in a spin-off sitcom, Peter Kay's Phoenix Nights (2001–2002) in turn generated another spin-off, Max and Paddy's Road to Nowhere (2004). In 2005, he recorded a promotional video in which he mimed to Tony Christie's 1971 song "(Is This the Way to) Amarillo", which was reissued to raise money for Comic Relief.

Kay co-wrote and starred in Britain's Got the Pop Factor... and Possibly a New Celebrity Jesus Christ Soapstar Superstar Strictly on Ice (2008), a parody of several British reality television shows. As the series' fictional protagonist Geraldine Mcqueen, he released the single "The Winner's Song". His 2010–2011 tour was recorded in the Guinness World Records as the most successful stand-up comedy tour of all time, playing to a total of over 1.14 million people. His later television work includes Cradle to Grave (2015), Peter Kay's Car Share (2015–2018), and Peter Kay's Comedy Shuffle (2016–2020). Kay provided the voice role of police constable (later chief inspector) Albert Mackintosh in two feature-length animated films of the Wallace & Gromit franchise: The Curse of the Were-Rabbit (2005) and Vengeance Most Fowl (2024).

== Early life ==
Peter John Kay was born on 2 July 1973 in Farnworth, Lancashire, where he attended Mount Saint Joseph School, leaving with a GCSE in art.

His father, Michael, was an engineer who died just before Peter's career took off. His mother, Deirdre (née O'Neill), is an Irish Catholic originally from Coalisland, County Tyrone, and Peter was brought up in her faith.

Kay took several minor jobs, including working in a toilet roll factory, a Netto supermarket, a video rental shop, Manchester Arena, a cash-and-carry, a cinema, a petrol station and a bingo hall, which later inspired episodes for That Peter Kay Thing. He was sacked from each, after a few months, for "not taking things seriously".

Kay began a degree course at the University of Liverpool in Drama, Theatre Studies and English Literature. He had misinformed the university to accept him, telling the university that he had four GCSEs and A-levels in Psychology and English Literature. Struggling with the course, he changed to studying a Higher National Diploma (HND) in media performance (including stand-up) at the University of Salford's Adelphi Campus School of Media, Music and Performance. In recognition of his contribution to the entertainment industry, Kay received an honorary Doctor of Arts degree from Salford University on 19 July 2016, at Salford's Lowry Theatre.

Kay started performing at the Frog & Bucket Comedy Club, on Oldham Street in Manchester, from July 1996, whilst his girlfriend worked at Boots.

== Career ==
=== Television ===
Kay's first TV project was in a 1997 episode of New Voices, a comedy series which showcased rising talent. His episode, "Two Minutes", written by Johanne McAndrew, saw him play a getaway driver as two of his friends attempted to rob a pub of its takings. In 1997, he played a delivery driver in the BBC drama Born to Run.

Also in 1997, he made an appearance on Coronation Street as a delivery driver for Fred Elliott's corner shop.

In 1998, Kay appeared in a series of sketches for Granada TV's "Last Laugh Show" and "Roy Mills Films of Fun", where he made his TV debut as a character comedy actor and also did a stand-up set. Neil Fitzmaurice also appeared in the series alongside many other local comedians who Kay later recruited for his Channel 4 series.

After presenting a slot entitled "Peter Kay's World of Entertainment" on BBC Two's The Sunday Show, Kay made an episode of Channel 4's Comedy Lab, "The Services", in 1998, which won a Royal Television Society award for best newcomer. This served as a pilot for That Peter Kay Thing.

Following the series' success, Kay and his co-writers – Neil Fitzmaurice and Dave Spikey – used the episode "In the Club" as the basis for Phoenix Nights, which was an immediate hit. Set in a newly refurbished social club run by Brian Potter, the first series was filmed in part at St. Gregory's Social Club in Farnworth, Greater Manchester, where the exterior, hallways and function suite were used.

He appeared in the first episode of the 2002 series of Linda Green, playing a pizza delivery man who ended up being something of a soulmate to the eponymous heroine. He has had two further roles in Coronation Street. The first, in the late 1990s, was a brief appearance as a shopfitter, but in January 2004 he co-wrote his scenes, appearing alongside Sally Lindsay, who played Shelley Unwin.

In 2004, Kay followed the success with Max and Paddy's Road to Nowhere, a spin-off of Phoenix Nights. The show featured the bouncer characters from the show, played by Kay and Paddy McGuinness, and also featured other characters from Phoenix Nights. Six episodes were made and broadcast from November to December 2004 by Channel 4. In 2005, Kay was awarded a Rose d'Or at the international television festival in Montreux for Best Performance by an Actor.

In 2004, Kay began appearing in a series of television adverts for UK brewery John Smith's bitter; these imitated the style of Phoenix Nights and saw Kay develop his catchphrases "'ave it!" and "two lamb bhunas".

On 17 April 2006, Channel 4 broadcast a "Peter Kay Night", showing out-takes from Phoenix Nights (previously featured on DVD); a behind-the-scenes documentary, "180 – A Tour Documentary", which followed Kay behind the scenes of his Mum Wants a Bungalow tour; and screened the whole Peter Kay Live in Manchester Arena show.

On 17 June 2006, Kay appeared in the Doctor Who episode "Love & Monsters". His character, the sinister Victor Kennedy, proved to be an alien called the Abzorbaloff in disguise.

In 2008, he returned to television after an absence of four years with the BAFTA-winning satire of reality talent shows, Peter Kay's Britain's Got the Pop Factor... and Possibly a New Celebrity Jesus Christ Soapstar Superstar Strictly on Ice, which he co-wrote with Paul Coleman. The two-hour special was screened on Channel 4 on 17 October 2008.

Kay won his second Royal Television Society award for best actor for playing Geraldine McQueen, a transgender dinner lady from Ireland.

In May 2015 the sitcom Peter Kay's Car Share was aired. The series was a success and a second series was commissioned to start in April 2017. In October 2015, he starred in Cradle to Grave, another BBC sitcom based on Danny Baker's life as a teenager.

=== Film ===
In 2001, he played Cyril the Barman in Blow Dry, based on the screenplay Never Better by Simon Beaufoy. Kay later admitted he took the part only expecting his scenes to be filmed in Keighley, Bradford, West Yorkshire. However, he was annoyed to discover that his scenes were being filmed in Shoreditch, Greater London.

=== Music ===
In 2007, Kay followed the success of "(Is This the Way to) Amarillo" with a cover version of "I'm Gonna Be (500 Miles)", originally by the Proclaimers, also for Comic Relief. In 2009, Kay released "The Official BBC Children in Need Medley", an animation featuring over 100 characters from children's television including Big Chris from Roary the Racing Car, who he voiced. The video was premiered on BBC1 on 20 November 2009.

Kay returned his support to Comic Relief in March 2011 with a cover version of "I Know Him So Well", re-recorded by singer Susan Boyle and Kay in the guise of Geraldine McQueen from Britain's Got the Pop Factor. The video that accompanied the single was also directed by Kay and identically parodied the original video shot for shot.

=== Theatre ===
In February 2007, Kay played director Roger DeBris in the Mel Brooks musical The Producers at Manchester's Palace Theatre for 120 shows.

=== Sporadic appearances and hiatus (2017–2022) ===
On 9 September 2017, Kay took part in the "We Are Manchester" benefit concert to mark the reopening of Manchester Arena following the terrorist attack in May 2017. He gave a speech to the crowd before introducing the concert's headline act, Noel Gallagher's High Flying Birds.

In April 2020, Kay featured in the BBC's Big Night In in which he introduced an updated version of "(Is This the Way to) Amarillo". It marked his first television appearance for two years.

On 2 January 2021, Kay was a guest on BBC Radio 2's Saturday morning show, with Cat Deeley hosting this 10am to 1pm programme as Graham Norton had by then left the slot.

In August 2021, Kay performed two sold-out shows at the O2 Apollo Manchester called 'Doing It for Laura' which had been organised in aid of Laura Nuttall, who was battling an aggressive brain tumour. The tickets for both shows sold out within 30 minutes.

=== Comeback (2022–present) ===
On 6 November 2022, Kay announced a return to stand-up with a tour beginning in December 2022 and ending in July 2025. Kay returned to TV in December 2024 to voice PC Mackintosh in Wallace & Gromit: Vengeance Most Fowl, reprising the role from Wallace & Gromit: The Curse of the Were-Rabbit (2005).

Kay published Peter Kay's Diary: The Monthly Memoir of a Boy from Bolton in October 2025.

=== Stand-up career ===
His first stand-up success was in the competition the North West Comedian of the Year, which was held in Manchester and hosted by Dave Spikey, who would later be the co-star and co-writer of Phoenix Nights. Kay was last on the bill and won the competition, beating Johnny Vegas. Kay has said that he sought a career in comedy. However, he continued to work part-time as an usher at his local cinema in Bolton whilst performing stand-up locally. When the cinema closed, he was presented with the choice of finding another job or moving into comedy full-time.

After he entered and won Channel 4's So You Think You're Funny? contest in 1997, his first semi-professional stand-up appearances were at the 1998 Edinburgh Fringe Festival, where he received a prestigious Perrier Award nomination. During this time, he also appeared at various other clubs, such as London's Comedy Store.

Although this led to a level of public recognition, it was only after his first live special, Live at the Top of the Tower in 2000, that Kay attained mainstream recognition. During this period, he appeared on several chat shows, such as Friday Night with Jonathan Ross and Parkinson, on the latter of which he had previously served as warm-up. It was at this time that production also began on Phoenix Nights.

In November 2009, after an absence of seven years, Kay announced a return to stand-up with four (later extended to 20) dates at the Manchester Arena the following April with a show entitled The Tour That Doesn't Tour Tour...Now On Tour. Demand for tickets caused him to announce soon after that the show would be toured. In January 2012, the tour entered the Guinness Book of World Records as the most successful stand-up comedy tour of all time, playing to a total of 1.2 million people.

Kay was included in the Independent on Sunday's "Happy List" in 2009 as "simply Britain's best comedian", and – as an exception to their general rule – was included again in 2010 for also raising funds for Children in Need.

In November 2017, Kay announced his intention to return to stand-up with his first tour in eight years. Peter Kay Live: Have Gags, Will Travel was scheduled to begin touring in 2018, beginning with the Genting Arena in April before touring at venues such as SSE Hydro, Manchester Arena, The O2 Arena, First Direct Arena, SSE Arena Belfast, Sheffield Arena and Echo Arena Liverpool. On 13 December 2017, Kay announced that he was cancelling all future work projects (including Peter Kay Live: Have Gags Will Travel tour) for family reasons, requesting that the media and public respect his and his family's privacy. The tour received criticism, as fans were charged 62p per minute to call premium rate phone lines to claim ticket refunds.

On 6 November 2022, via an advert during the series 22 premiere of I'm a Celebrity...Get Me Out of Here!, Kay announced his first stand-up tour in twelve years, running from 2 December 2022 to 11 August 2023. In solidarity with the current cost of living crisis, Kay stated that tickets would start at £35, matching the price of his previous 2010 tour. Due to demand, additional dates were announced for 2024, 2025 and 2026.

On 26 November 2025, Kay announced 9 additional arena shows for 2026 as part of his "Better Late Than Never" Tour, ending in August. Profits from these performances will be donated to the 12 cancer charities. Kay expressed hope for public engagement for this cause, stating, "Unfortunately, just about everyone knows someone who's been affected by one of the cancers on that list. I really hope people can get behind this." All additional performances are in the Manchester Arena.

=== Goodnight Vienna Productions ===
Kay and his wife Susan are the two directors of Goodnight Vienna Productions, which co-produces Kay's comedy output.

== Personal life ==
In 1997, Kay met Susan Gargan while he was working at the local cinema. They married in 2001 after being in a relationship for three years. They have one son together. The family reside in Bolton but also have a property in Lough Derg, County Tipperary in Ireland.

Kay is teetotal.

== Stand-up tours ==
Year	Title	Notes
2002–2003	Mum Wants a Bungalow Tour	First solo tour, 89 dates
2010–2011	The Tour That Doesn't Tour Tour...Now On Tour	122 dates (98 in England, 14 in Ireland, 5 in Scotland, 5 in Wales) 1.2 million tickets sold
2018–2019	Have Gags, Will Travel	Planned 90 dates, tour cancelled
2022– 2026	Peter Kay Live!	189 dates

== Filmography ==
=== Television ===
Year	Title	Role	Notes
1996	New Voices	George	Episode: "Two Minutes"
1997	Coronation Street	Shopfitter	Episode dated 17 November 1997
1998	Barking	Roy	1 episode
1998	The Last Laugh Show	Various roles	10 Episodes
1998	Comedy Lab	Various roles	Episode: "The Services"
1998	Let's Get Quizzical	Himself	
1999	Butterfly Collectors	Ronnie	2-part miniseries
1999	City Central	Brian	Episode: "Someone to Watch Over Me"
2000	That Peter Kay Thing	Various roles	6 episodes
2000	The Secret World of Michael Fry	Barney – Barman	Miniseries
2001–2002	Phoenix Nights	Brian Potter / Maxwell "Max" Bygraves	12 episodes
2002	Linda Green	Eddie	Episode: "No Friends"
2003	Comic Relief 2003: The Big Hair Do	Brian Potter	TV special
2004	Max and Paddy's Road to Nowhere	Maxwell "Max" Bygraves / Brian Potter	6 episodes
2004	Coronation Street	Eric Gartside	2 episodes dated 30 January 2004
2005	The Catherine Tate Show	Tommy	Episode: "Large Breasted Doctor"
2005	Mrs. Brown's Boys	Jason – Travel Agent	Episode: "Good Mourning Mrs. Brown"
2006	Doctor Who	Victor Kennedy / Abzorbaloff	Episode: "Love & Monsters"
2006	Little Britain: Abroad	Ivanka's Husband (Dudley Punt's little brother)	Part 2
2007–2010	Roary the Racing Car	Big Chris / Tin Top / Big Christine (UK voices)	
2008	Britain's Got the Pop Factor... and Possibly a New Celebrity Jesus Christ Soapstar Superstar Strictly on Ice	Geraldine McQueen	
2008	Take That Come to Town	Geraldine McQueen	TV film
2009	Peter Kay: Raider of the Pop Charts	Himself	2-part documentary
2010	Brit Awards 2010	Himself – Host	TV award show
2012	Peter Kay: In Conversation	Himself	TV special
2013	Comic Relief 2013	Himself	Telethon
2013	Goodbye Granadaland	Himself	Documentary
2015	Cradle to Grave	Fred "Spud" Baker	8 episodes
2015	Peter Kay: 20 Years of Funny	Himself	Documentary
2015–2018	Peter Kay's Car Share	John Redmond	12 episodes
2016–2020	Peter Kay's Comedy Shuffle	Himself	25 episodes
2017	Let It Shine	Himself – Guest Judge	Series 1, Episode 10
2017	Inside No. 9	Neil	Episode: "Private View"
2020	The Big Night In	Himself	

=== Film ===
Year	Title	Role	Notes	Source
2000	Going Off Big Time	Flipper		
2001	Blow Dry	Cyril the Barman		
2002	Roddy Smythe Investigates...	Tommy Doyle	Video short	
2002	24 Hour Party People	Don Tonay		
2002	Last Rumba in Rochdale	Dad (voice)	Short	
2005	The League of Gentlemen's Apocalypse	Simon Pig		
2005	Wallace & Gromit: The Curse of the Were-Rabbit	PC Albert Mackintosh (voice)		
2005	Max & Paddy's The Power of Two	Maxwell "Max" Bygraves	Video	
2024	Wallace & Gromit: Vengeance Most Fowl	Chief Inspector Albert Mackintosh (voice)		

=== Music video appearances ===
Year	Title	Artist	Ref.
2006	"Sleep"	Texas	

=== DVD releases ===
In December 2011, it was reported that Kay had sold over 10 million DVDs, a UK record for a comedian and more than the combined sales of best selling films Avatar and Mamma Mia!.

Title	Release date	Age rating
Live at the Top of the Tower	22 November 2000	15
Live at the Bolton Albert Halls "Mum Wants a Bungalow Tour"	10 November 2003	15
Live at the Manchester Arena	14 November 2005	15
Live – The Tour That Didn't Tour – Tour	7 November 2011	15
Peter Kay: Live & Back on Nights	19 November 2012	15

== Discography ==
=== Albums ===
- 2005: The Best of Peter Kay – So Far

=== Singles ===
Year	Song	UK	IRE	EU
2005	"Is This the Way to Amarillo" (Tony Christie feat. Peter Kay)	1	1	4
2007	"I'm Gonna Be (500 Miles)" (as Brian Potter, with the Proclaimers and Andy Pipkin)	1	7	16
2008	"The Winner's Song" ^{1}	2	—	21
2008	"Once Upon a Christmas Song" ^{1}	5	35	15
2009	"The Official BBC Children in Need Medley" (Peter Kay's Animated All-Star Band)	1	6	7
2011	"I Know Him So Well" (credited to Peter Kay and Comic Relief present Susan Boyle & Geraldine McQueen on the record, Peter Kay & Susan Boyle on the UK singles chart) ^{1}	11	—	—

^1 As Geraldine McQueen.

== Books written ==
- The Sound of Laughter (2006)
- Saturday Night Peter (2009)
- The Book That's More Than Just a Book - Book (2011)
- T.V.: Big Adventures on the Small Screen (2023)
- Peter Kay's Diary: The Monthly Memoir of a Boy from Bolton (2025)

== Awards and nominations ==
Year	Award	Category	Work	Result	Ref
2003	British Comedy Awards	People's Choice Awards	Phoenix Nights	Won	
2003	British Comedy Awards	Writer of the Year	For Phoenix Nights	Won	
2003	2003 British Academy Television Awards	Best Comedy Performance	For Phoenix Nights	Nominated	
2003	2003 British Academy Television Awards	Situation Comedy Award	For Phoenix Nights	Nominated	
2009	British Comedy Awards	Outstanding Contribution to Comedy	Peter Kay	Won	
2016	2016 British Academy Television Awards	Best Male Comedy Performance	Peter Kay	Won	
2016	2016 British Academy Television Awards	Best Scripted Comedy	Peter Kay's Car Share	Won	
2016	National Television Awards	Most Popular Comedy Series	Peter Kay's Car Share	Won	
