= The Ting Tings discography =

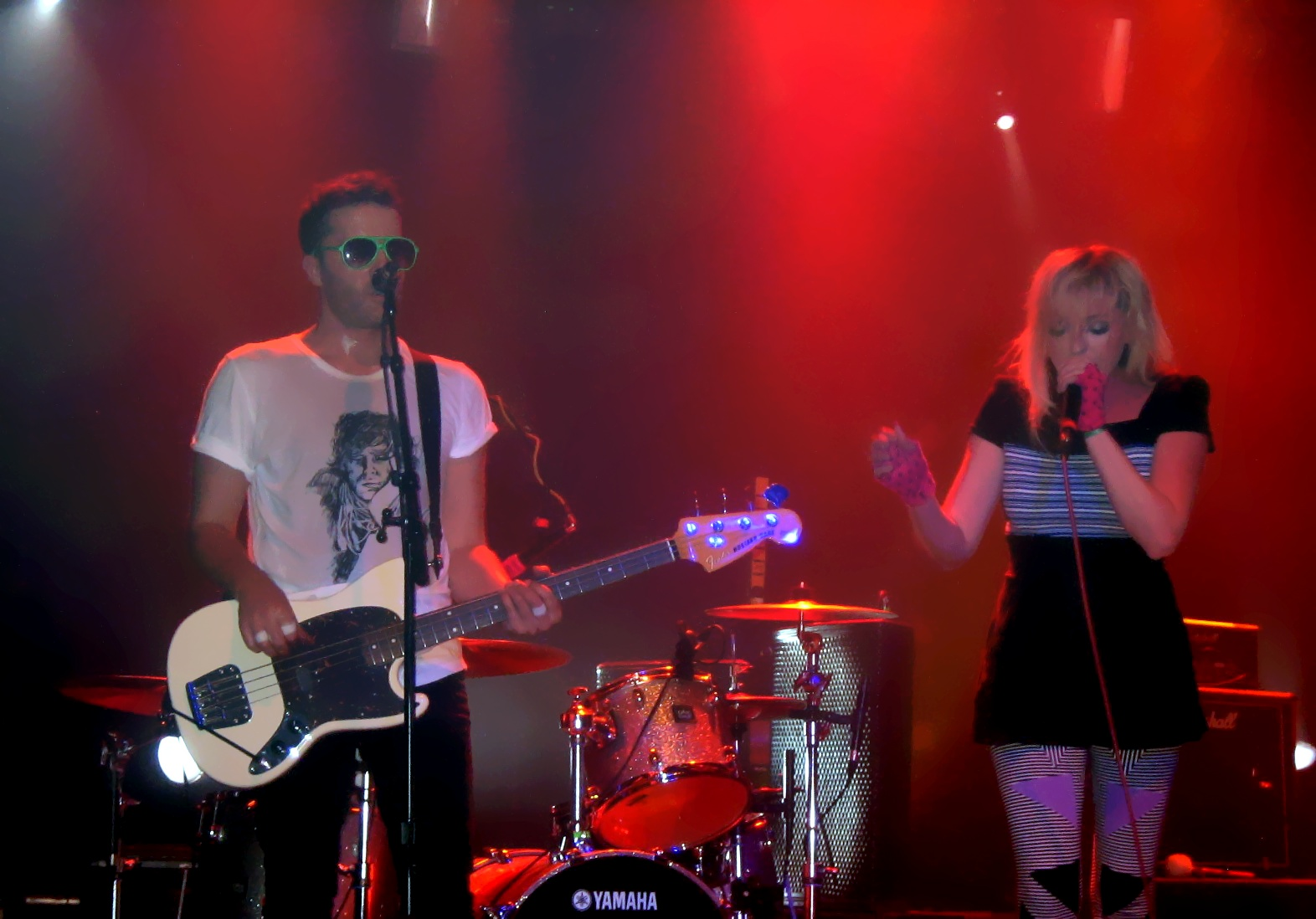
- The Ting Tings performing the Mod Club Theatre in Toronto, Ontario, Canada
- Studio albums: 5
- Extended plays: 3
- Live albums: 1
- Singles: 16
- Music videos: 14

The discography of The Ting Tings, an English indie pop duo, consists of five studio albums, three extended plays, 10 singles and 14 music videos. The Ting Tings were formed in 2004 in Salford, England by Jules De Martino and Katie White. The band was signed to independent record label Switchflicker Records in 2006 and released their limited-edition debut single, "Fruit Machine", the following year. Following an appearance at the Glastonbury Festival in 2007, The Ting Tings were signed to Columbia Records.

The Ting Tings released their debut album We Started Nothing in May 2008. The album peaked at number one on the UK Albums Chart and was certified platinum by the British Phonographic Industry (BPI). It also peaked at number 22 on the Australian albums chart and was certified gold by the Australian Recording Industry Association (ARIA). The group's third single, "That's Not My Name", topped the UK Singles Chart. The song peaked at number eight on the Australian Singles Chart and was certified gold by the ARIA. "Shut Up and Let Me Go", the album's fourth single, peaked at number one on the US Billboard Hot Dance Club Play chart and was certified platinum by the Recording Industry Association of America (RIAA).

The Ting Tings' second studio album, Sounds from Nowheresville, was less successful. It spent only two weeks on the UK Albums Chart peaking at number 23, and reached number 87 on the Billboard 200. In the UK, it generated one top 40 single, "Hands", which peaked at number 29.

The group's third studio album, Super Critical, was a commercial disappointment, not reaching the top 100 on the UK Albums chart and generating no charting singles in the UK. "Wrong Club", the album's lead single, did manage to chart in Japan however, where it reached number 45; it also reached number 53 in Belgium.

The Ting Tings' fourth album, The Black Light, was released in 2018.

== Albums ==
=== Studio albums ===
List of studio albums, with selected chart positions and certifications
| Title | Album details | Peak chart positions | | | | | | | | | | Certifications |
| Title | Album details | UK | AUS | AUT | BEL | FRA | IRL | JPN | NLD | SWI | US | Certifications |
|---|---|---|---|---|---|---|---|---|---|---|---|---|
| We Started Nothing | Released: 16 May 2008; Label: Columbia; Formats: CD, LP, digital download | 1 | 22 | 57 | 38 | 21 | 3 | 50 | 20 | 28 | 78 | BPI: 2× Platinum; ARIA: Gold; IRMA: Platinum; SNEP: Silver |
| Sounds from Nowheresville | Released: 27 February 2012; Label: Columbia; Formats: CD, LP, digital download | 23 | 51 | 30 | 46 | 59 | 44 | 49 | 53 | 12 | 87 | |
| Super Critical | Released: 27 October 2014; Label: Finca; Formats: CD, LP, digital download | 111 | — | — | 172 | — | — | 100 | — | — | — | |
| The Black Light | Released: 26 October 2018; Label: Finca; Formats: CD, LP, digital download | — | — | — | — | — | — | — | — | — | — | |
| Home | Released: 6 June 2025; Label: Wonderful Records; Formats: CD, LP, digital download | — (Note: Home did not enter UK Albums chart, but charted at number 35 on the UK Albums Sales chart.) | — | — | — | — | — | — | — | — | — | |
"—" denotes a recording that did not chart or was not released in that territory.

=== Live albums ===
List of live albums
| Title | Details |
|---|---|
| Live from SoHo | Released: 13 September 2008; Label: Sony BMG; Formats: Digital download |

== Extended plays ==
List of extended plays
| Title | Details | Peak chart positions |
| Title | Details | UK |
|---|---|---|
| iTunes Live: London Festival '08 | Released: 18 July 2008; Label: Sony BMG; Formats: Digital download | — (Note: iTunes Live: London Festival '08 did not enter UK Albums chart, but charted at number 22 on the UK Album Downloads chart.) |
| Live at Lollapalooza 2008 | Released: 30 September 2008; Label: Sony BMG; Formats: Digital download | — |
| Spotify Sessions | Released: 24 November 2014; Label: Finca; Formats: Streaming | — |

== Singles ==
List of singles, with selected chart positions and certifications, showing year released and album name
| Title | Year | Peak chart positions | | | | | | | | | | Certifications | Album |
| Title | Year | UK | AUS | BEL | CAN | GER | IRL | JPN | NLD | SWI | US | Certifications | Album |
|---|---|---|---|---|---|---|---|---|---|---|---|---|---|
| "That's Not My Name" / "Great DJ" | 2007 | — | — | — | — | — | — | — | — | — | — | | We Started Nothing |
| "Fruit Machine" | 2007 | — | — | — | — | — | — | — | — | — | — | | We Started Nothing |
| "Great DJ" (re-release) | 2008 | 33 | 52 | 47 | — | — | 35 | 5 | — | — (Note: "Great DJ" did not enter the Swiss Singles chart, but charted at number 100 on the Swiss Airplay chart.) | — | RIAJ: Gold | We Started Nothing |
| "That's Not My Name" (re-release) | 2008 | 1 | 8 | 48 | 57 | 42 | 2 | — | 59 | 44 | 39 | BPI: Platinum; ARIA: Platinum; RIAA: Platinum | We Started Nothing |
| "Shut Up and Let Me Go" | 2008 | 6 | 44 | 31 | 29 | 43 | 9 | 34 | 65 | 48 | 55 | BPI: Silver; RIAA: Platinum | We Started Nothing |
| "Be the One" | 2008 | 28 | — | — | — | — | — | — | — | — (Note: "Be the One" did not enter the Swiss Singles chart, but charted at number 65 on the Swiss Airplay chart.) | — | | We Started Nothing |
| "We Walk" | 2009 | 58 | — | — (Note: "We Walk" did not enter the Flemish Ultratop chart, but peaked at number 8 on the Ultratip chart.) | — | — | — | — | — | — | — | | We Started Nothing |
| "Hands" | 2010 | 29 | 57 | 26 | — | — | — | — | — | 70 | — (Note: "Hands" did not enter the Billboard Hot 100, but peaked at number 21 on the Hot Singles Sales chart.) | | Sounds from Nowheresville (Deluxe) |
| "Hang It Up" | 2011 | 124 | — | — | — | — | — | 8 | — | — | — | | Sounds from Nowheresville |
| "Hit Me Down Sonny" | 2012 | — | — | — | — | — | — | — | — | — | — | | Sounds from Nowheresville |
| "Wrong Club" | 2014 | — | — | — (Note: "Wrong Club" did not enter the Flemish Ultratop chart, but peaked at number 53 on the Ultratip chart.) | — | — | — | 45 | — | — | — | | Super Critical |
| "Do It Again" | 2014 | — | — | — (Note: "Do It Again" did not enter the Flemish Ultratop chart, but peaked at number 38 on the Ultratip chart.) | — | — | — | — | — | — | — | | Super Critical |
| "Blacklight" | 2018 | — | — | — | — | — | — | — | — | — | — | | The Black Light |
| "Estranged" | 2018 | — | — | — | — | — | — | — | — | — | — | | The Black Light |
| "Down" | 2024 | — | — | — | — | — | — | — | — | — | — | | Home |
| "Danced on the Wire" | 2024 | — | — | — | — | — | — | — | — | — | — | | Home |
| "Good People Do Bad Things" | 2025 | — | — | — | — | — | — | — | — | — | — | | Home |
| "Dreaming" | 2025 | — | — | — | — | — | — | — | — | — | — | | Home |
"—" denotes a recording that did not chart or was not released in that territory.

=== Promo singles ===
List of promotional singles, showing year released and album name
| Title | Year | Album |
|---|---|---|
| "We're Not the Same" | 2010 | Sounds from Nowheresville (Deluxe) |

=== As featured artist ===
List of singles as featured artist, showing year released and album name
| Title | Year | Album |
|---|---|---|
| "Subterranean Homesick Blues" (The Ting Tings Remix) (Bob Dylan) | 2011 | Non-album single |

== Other charted songs ==
List of songs, with selected chart positions, showing year released and album name
| Title | Year | Peak chart positions | Album |
| Title | Year | FRA | Album |
|---|---|---|---|
| "Soul Killing" | 2012 | 131 | Sounds from Nowheresville |

== Other appearances ==
List of guest appearances, showing year released and album name
| Title | Year | Album |
|---|---|---|
| "Anyway I Can" | 2008 | NME Awards 2008 |
| "Standing in the Way of Control" | 2008 | Radio 1's Live Lounge – Volume 3 |
| "Happy Birthday" | 2010 | Music Is...Awesome! Volume 2 |
| "Dub Be Good to Me" | 2010 | Dermot O'Leary Presents The Saturday Sessions |

== Music videos ==
List of music videos, showing year released and director
| Title | Year | Director(s) |
|---|---|---|
| "That's Not My Name" (version 1) | 2007 | Sophie Muller |
| "Great DJ" | 2008 | David Shafei |
| "That's Not My Name" (version 2) | 2008 | David Allain |
| "Shut Up and Let Me Go" | 2008 | AlexandLiane |
| "Be the One" | 2008 | Keith Schofield |
| "That's Not My Name" (version 3) | 2009 | AlexandLiane |
| "We Walk" | 2009 | Ben Ib |
| "Hands" | 2010 | Warren Fu |
| "Hang It Up" | 2011 | Dan Gable |
| "Hang It Up" (live in Paris) | 2011 | Dan Gable |
| "Silence" (Bag Raiders Remix) | 2011 | Dan Gable |
| "Hands" (live from Paris) | 2012 | Dan Gable |
| "Day to Day" (acoustic) | 2012 | George Taylor |
| "Hit Me Down Sonny" (live from Paris) | 2012 | Dan Gable |
| "Wrong Club" | 2014 | Lisa Paclet |
| "Do It Again" | 2014 | Daffy |
| "Blacklight" | 2018 | |
| "Estranged" | 2018 | |
