= Show Us Yours Tour =

2011–12 concert tour by the Ting Tings

- Tour by The Ting Tings
- Associated album: Sounds from Nowheresville
- Start date: 21 November 2011
- End date: 4 May 2012
- Legs: 2
- No. of shows: 9 in Europe; 25 in North America; 34 Total

The Ting Tings concert chronology
- We Started Nothing Tour (2007-10); Show Us Yours Tour (2011-12)

In promotion of their second album Sounds from Nowheresville, indie rock duo the Ting Tings embarked on a promotional tour. While their first tour included more dates and shows in Latin America, South America, and Australia, the Show Us Yours Tour contained fewer shows and remained limited to the United Kingdom and North America.

For the European leg of the tour in late 2011, the band ran a competition that allowed fans to create original artwork to be featured on the cover art of Sounds from Nowheresville. The winning entry was a drawing by Milan Abad that depicted Katie White and Jules De Martino as skeletons. Other entries were placed in the album insert. Remix stems of the song "Hang It Up" were also made available on their website with which fans could create their own remixes of the song and submit them. All the entered remixes were uploaded onto the band's SoundCloud account. Two of the nine submitted remixes: the Inertia remix and CKB remix, were included as bonus tracks on the deluxe edition of the album.

== Setlist ==
Setlist
- 1. "Give It Back"
- 2. "Hang It Up"
- 3. "Great DJ"
- 4. "Fruit Machine"
- 5. "Guggenheim"
- 6. "Silence"
- 7. "Keep Your Head"
- 8. "We Walk"
- 9. "Hit Me Down Sonny"
- 10. "Shut Up and Let Me Go"
- 11. "Hands"

Encore

- 12. "That's Not My Name"
Hands was performed in remix form, utilizing samples from the Michael Woods remix of the song with added drum and guitar parts.

== Opening act ==
- MNDR
- Charli XCX

== Tour dates ==
Date	City	Country	Venue
Europe
21 November 2011	Leeds	United Kingdom	The Cockpit
22 November 2011	London	United Kingdom	King's College
23 November 2011	Bournemouth	United Kingdom	The Old Fire Station
25 November 2011	Birmingham	United Kingdom	O2 Academy Leicester
26 November 2011	Liverpool	United Kingdom	Stanley Theatre
27 November 2011	Manchester	United Kingdom	Sound Control
29 November 2011	Glasgow	United Kingdom	Arches
30 November 2011	Newcastle	United Kingdom	O2 Academy Newcastle
1 December 2011	Bristol	United Kingdom	The Thekla
North America
20 March 2012	Tempe	United States	Clubhouse
21 March 2012	Los Angeles	United States	El Rey Theatre
22 March 2012	Los Angeles	United States	El Rey Theatre
23 March 2012	San Diego	United States	House of Blues
25 March 2012	San Francisco	United States	The Fillmore
27 March 2012	Vancouver	Canada	Commodore Ballroom
28 March 2012	Seattle	United States	Showbox at the Market
30 March 2012	Salt Lake City	United States	Club Sound
31 March 2012	Denver	United States	Ogden Theatre
2 April 2012	Minneapolis	United States	First Avenue
3 April 2012	Chicago	United States	Park West
5 April 2012	Detroit	United States	Saint Andrew's Hall
6 April 2012	Toronto	Canada	Phoenix Concert Theatre
7 April 2012	Montreal	Canada	Le National
9 April 2012	Boston	United States	Paradise
11 April 2012	New York City	United States	Webster Hall
12 April 2012	Washington, D.C.	United States	9:30 Club
13 April 2012	Philadelphia	United States	Trocadero Theater
14 April 2012	Baltimore	United States	Rams Head Live!
16 April 2012	Atlanta	United States	Variety Playhouse
17 April 2012	Birmingham	United States	Workplay Soundstage
18 April 2012	New Orleans	United States	House of Blues
20 April 2012	Houston	United States	Fitzgerald's
21 April 2012	Dallas	United States	Granada Theater
4 May 2012	Detroit	United States	Saint Andrew's Hall
