= List of awards and nominations received by the Ting Tings =

The Ting Tings awards and nominations
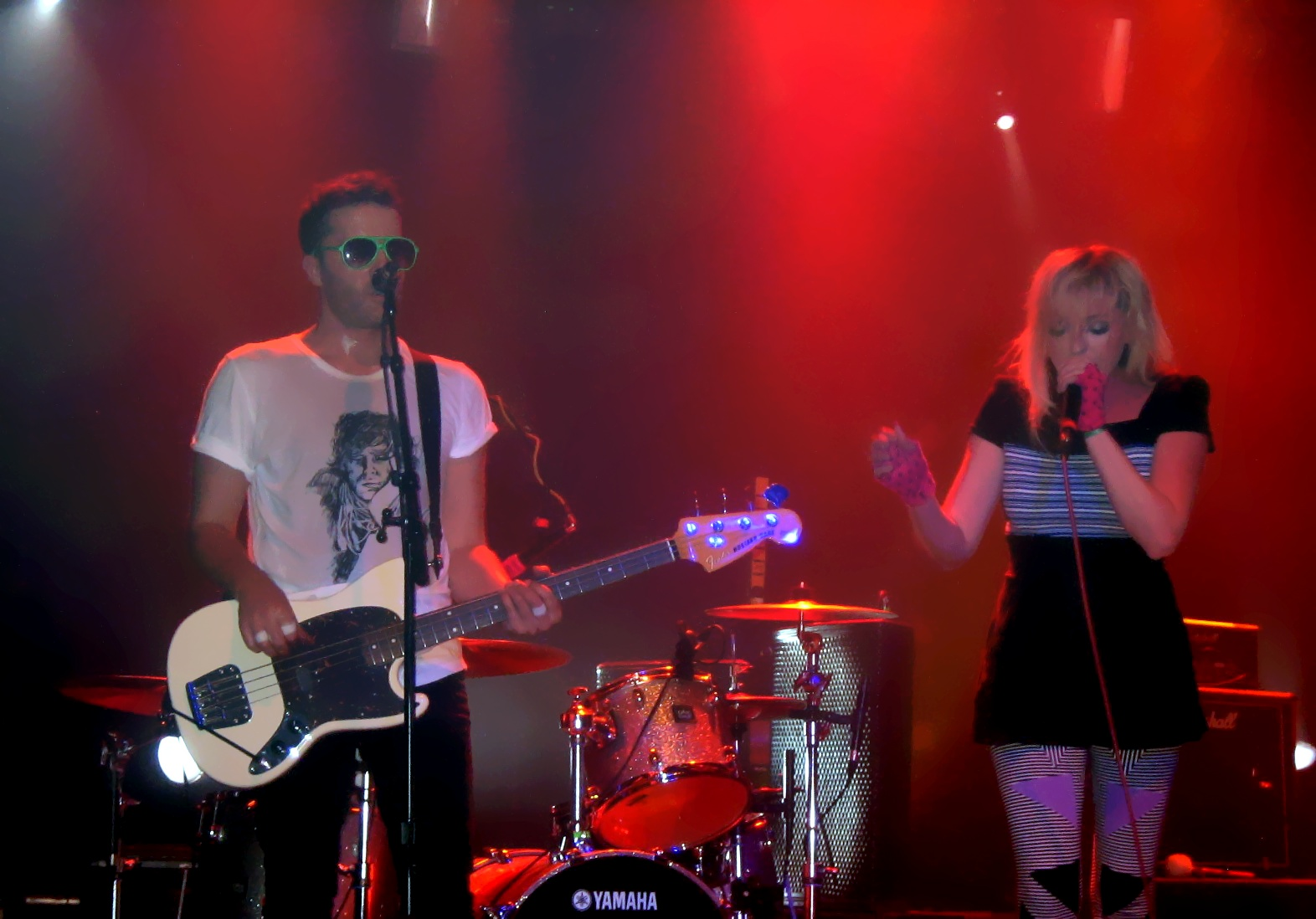
- The Ting Tings performing at the Mod Club Theatre in Toronto, 14 March 2009
Awards and nominations
| Award | Wins | Nominations |
| Antville Music Video Awards | 0 | 1 |
| BRIT Awards | 0 | 2 |
| BT Digital Music Awards | 0 | 1 |
| European Border Breakers Awards | 1 | 1 |
| Glamour Awards | 0 | 1 |
| Grammy Awards | 0 | 1 |
| International Dance Music Awards | 1 | 2 |
| Ivor Novello Awards | 0 | 2 |
| Kids' Choice Awards | 0 | 1 |
| NME Awards | 0 | 1 |
| MP3 Music Awards | 0 | 1 |
| MTV Australia Awards | 0 | 1 |
| MTV Europe Music Awards | 0 | 1 |
| MTV Video Music Awards | 1 | 2 |
| mtvU Woodie Awards | 0 | 1 |
| Premios Oye! | 0 | 1 |
| Q Awards | 0 | 3 |
| UK Festival Awards | 3 | 3 |
| Vodafone Live Music Awards | 1 | 1 |
| XFM New Music Awards | 0 | 1 |
- Totals
| Awards won | 7 |
| Nominations | 29 |

The Ting Tings are a British band composed of two members named Katie White (vocals, guitar, bass drums, bass guitar, cowbells) and Jules De Martino (drums, lead guitar, bass guitar, vocals, piano). They have had success with their debut album, We Started Nothing. Australian's radio station, Triple J Hottest 100 ranked "Shut Up and Let Me Go" in number 78 and "That's Not My Name" at number 9 in their Hottest 100 in 2008.

== Antville Music Video Awards ==
The Antville Music Video Awards are online awards for the best music video and music video directors of the year. They were first awarded in 2005.

| Year | Nominee / work | Award | Result | Ref. |
|---|---|---|---|---|
| 2008 | Shut Up and Let Me Go | Best Editing | Nominated | |

== BRIT Awards ==
The Brit Awards are the British Phonographic Industry's annual pop music awards.

| Year | Nominee / work | Award | Result | Ref. |
|---|---|---|---|---|
| 2009 | "The Ting Tings" | British Breakthrough Act | Nominated | |
| 2009 | We Started Nothing | British Album of the Year | Nominated | |

== BT Digital Music Awards ==
The BT Digital Music Awards (DMA) was a British music award ceremony held annually for 10 years from 2002 to 2011 (with no ceremony in 2009). Music industry professionals nominated artists, venues and hardware into the Judge's Choice award categories.

| Year | Nominee / work | Award | Result | Ref. |
|---|---|---|---|---|
| 2008 | The Tings Tings | Best Pop Artist | Nominated | |

== European Border Breakers Awards ==
The European Border Breakers Awards is an annual prize awarded to recognize the success of ten emerging artists or groups who reached audiences outside their own countries with their first internationally released album in the past year.

| Year | Nominee / work | Award | Result | Ref. |
|---|---|---|---|---|
| 2009 | We Started Nothing | European Border Breakers Awards: United Kingdom | Won | |

== Glamour Awards ==
The 'Glamour Awards' is an annual awards hosted by Glamour magazine in order to honour "extraordinary and inspirational" women from a variety of fields, including entertainment, business, sports, music, science, medicine, education and politics. There is also an award handed out each year called the Man of the Year for men. The awards started in 2003.

| Year | Nominee / work | Award | Result | Ref. |
|---|---|---|---|---|
| 2009 | The Tings Tings | Newcomer of the Year | Nominated | |
| 2009 | The Tings Tings | UK Solo Artist of the Year | Nominated | |

== Grammy Awards ==
The Grammy Awards are awarded annually by the National Academy of Recording Arts and Sciences of the United States.

| Year | Nominee / work | Award | Result | Ref. |
|---|---|---|---|---|
| 2010 | "The Ting Tings" | Best New Artist | Nominated | |

== Hit FM Music Awards ==
| Year | Nominee / work | Award | Result | Ref. |
|---|---|---|---|---|
| 2009 | Themselves | Best New Artist | Won | |
| 2009 | Themselves | Best Breakthrough Artist | Nominated | |
| 2009 | Themselves | Band of the Year | Nominated | |
| 2009 | Themselves | Most Faddish Artist | Nominated | |
| 2009 | "Great DJ" | Song of the Year | Nominated | |

== International Dance Music Awards ==
The International Dance Music Awards, established in 1985, are an annual awards show honoring dance and electronic artists. It is a part of the Winter Music Conference, a weeklong electronic music event held annually.

| Year | Nominee / work | Award | Result | Ref. |
|---|---|---|---|---|
| 2009 | "Shut Up and Let Me Go" | Best Alternative/Rock Dance Track | Nominated | |
| 2009 | The Tings Tings | Best Break-Through Artist (Group) | Won | |

== Ivor Novello Awards ==
The Ivor Novello Awards, named after the entertainer Ivor Novello, are awards for songwriting and composing.

| Year | Nominee / work | Award | Result | Ref. |
|---|---|---|---|---|
| 2009 | We Started Nothing | Album Awards | Nominated | |
| 2009 | "That's Not My Name" | Best Contemporary Song | Nominated | |

== MP3 Music Awards ==
The MP3 Music Awards were established in 2007 to celebrate and award the most popular artists and bands, as well as the best MP3 players and retailers.

| Year | Nominee / work | Award | Result | Ref. |
|---|---|---|---|---|
| 2009 | We Walk | The MIC Award (Music/Industry/Choice) | Nominated | |

== MTV Awards ==
=== MTV Australia Awards ===
The MTV Australia Awards (previously known as the MTV Australia Video Music Awards or AVMA's) started in 2005 and were Australia's first awards show to celebrate both local and international acts.

| Year | Nominee / work | Award | Result | Ref. |
|---|---|---|---|---|
| 2009 | "The Ting Tings" | Breakthrough Act | Nominated | |

=== MTV Europe Music Awards ===
The MTV Europe Music Awards was established in 1994 by MTV Europe to award the music videos from European and international artists.

| Year | Nominee / work | Award | Result | Ref. |
|---|---|---|---|---|
| 2008 | The Tings Tings | Best UK Act | Nominated | |

=== MTV Video Music Awards ===
The MTV Video Music Awards were established in 1984 by MTV to award music videos of the year.

| Year | Nominee / work | Award | Result | Ref. |
|---|---|---|---|---|
| 2008 | "Shut Up and Let Me Go" | Video of the Year | Nominated | |
| 2008 | "Shut Up and Let Me Go" | Best UK Video | Won | |

=== mtvU Woodie Awards ===
MTVU broadcasts its own semi-annual awards show, the MTV Woodies, which it states recognizes "the music voted best by college students."

| Year | Nominee / work | Award | Result | Ref. |
|---|---|---|---|---|
| 2008 | The Tings Tings | best performing woodie | Nominated | |

== Nickelodeon UK Kids Choice Awards ==
The Nickelodeon Kids' Choice Awards UK, also known as the KCAs, is an annual awards show, similar to the American and Australian versions.

| Year | Nominee / work | Award | Result | Ref. |
|---|---|---|---|---|
| 2008 | "That's Not My Name" | MTV Hits Favourite Song | Nominated | |

== NME Awards ==
The NME Awards is an annual music awards show in the United Kingdom, founded by the music magazine, NME

| Year | Nominee / work | Award | Result | Ref. |
|---|---|---|---|---|
| 2009 | The Tings Tings | Best Breakthrough Act | Nominated | |
| 2009 | "That's Not My Name" | Best Track | Nominated | |

== Premios Oye! ==
Premios Oye! (Premio Nacional a la Música Grabada) are presented annually by the Academia Nacional de la Música en México for outstanding achievements in the Mexican record industry.

| Year | Nominee / work | Award | Result | Ref. |
|---|---|---|---|---|
| 2009 | The Tings Tings | Main English Breakthrough of the Year | Nominated | |

== Q Awards ==
The Q Awards are the UK's annual music awards run by the music magazine Q.

| Year | Nominee / work | Award | Result | Ref. |
|---|---|---|---|---|
| 2008 | "That's Not My Name" | Best Track | Nominated | |
| 2008 | "That's Not My Name" | Best Video | Nominated | |
| 2008 | The Tings Tings | Best New Act | Nominated | |

== UK Festival Awards ==
The UK Festival Awards are awarded annually, with various categories for all aspects of festivals that have taken place in the UK, and one category for European festivals. The Awards were first established in 2004, and are produced by Virtual Festivals.com. They are voted for by the public via the UK Festival Awards website. To ensure fairness, the votes are weighted to take into account the event capacity.

| Year | Nominee / work | Award | Result | Ref. |
|---|---|---|---|---|
| 2008 | The Tings Tings | Festival Pop Act | Won | |
| 2008 | The Tings Tings | Best Newcomer Awards | Won | |
| 2008 | The Tings Tings | Anthem of the Summer | Won | |

== Vodafone Live Music Awards ==
The Vodafone Live Music Awards are awards to celebrate all that is brilliant in live music.

| Year | Nominee / work | Award | Result | Ref. |
|---|---|---|---|---|
| 2008 | The Tings Tings | XFM Live Breakthrough Act | Won | |

== XFM New Music Awards ==
XFM New Music Awards are awards voted by the station's viewers

| Year | Nominee / work | Award | Result | Ref. |
|---|---|---|---|---|
| 2008 | We Started Nothing | Best Debut Album | Nominated | |

== Žebřík Music Awards ==
| Year | Nominee / work | Award | Result | Ref. |
|---|---|---|---|---|
| 2008 | Themselves | Best International Discovery | Nominated | |
| 2009 | Themselves | Best International Discovery | Nominated | |
