= He's Just Not That into You (soundtrack) =

2009 soundtrack albums

He's Just Not That into You (Original Motion Picture Soundtrack) and He's Just Not That into You (Original Motion Picture Score) are the soundtracks for the 2009 film He's Just Not That into You. Both the albums were distributed by New Line Records and released on February 3 and 17, 2009, respectively.

== He's Just Not That into You (Original Motion Picture Soundtrack) ==
He's Just Not That into You (Original Motion Picture Soundtrack)

Soundtrack album by various artists
- Released: February 3, 2009
- Genres: Pop; dance-pop; electropop; R&B; hip-hop; jazz
- Length: 70:24
- Label: New Line

The soundtrack album was released on February 3, 2009, by New Line Records. It features 20 tracks including R.E.M, Talking Heads, Tristan Prettyman, My Morning Jacket, Maroon 5, The Replacements amongst various artists. Scarlett Johansson also covered the Jeff Buckley's 1995 song "Last Goodbye".

=== Critical reception ===
Eric Schneider of AllMusic noted that the team assembled "a pointed collection of relationship-themed pop/rock tunes" also including various tunes from the 1980s and "top-notch tracks from the 21st century". Jay S. Jacobs of PopEntertainment.com noted "Most of the songs here are pretty damned strong. This is music to fall in love to in a perfect world."

=== Track listing ===
No.	Title	Artist(s)	Length
1.	"I'd Like To"	Corinne Bailey Rae	4:06
2.	"I'm Amazed"	My Morning Jacket	4:34
3.	"Don't You Want Me"	The Human League	3:57
4.	"Supernatural Superserious"	R.E.M.	3:24
5.	"Madly"	Tristan Prettyman	3:18
6.	"This Must Be the Place (Naive Melody)"	Talking Heads	4:55
7.	"By Your Side"	The Black Crowes	4:29
8.	"Buscando Olvidar"	Alfred Gómez Jr.	3:48
9.	"I Must Be High"	Wilco	2:59
10.	"Sweet Sixteen Bars"	Michael Pewny and Torsten Zwingenberger	3:06
11.	"You Make It Real"	James Morrison	3:32
12.	"If I Never See Your Face Again"	Maroon 5	3:19
13.	"Can't Hardly Wait"	The Replacements	3:04
14.	"Fruit Machine"	The Ting Tings	2:53
15.	"Smile"	Lily Allen	3:15
16.	"Somewhere Only We Know"	Keane	3:57
17.	"Love, Save the Empty"	Erin McCarley	3:17
18.	"Friday I'm in Love"	The Cure	3:35
19.	"Last Goodbye"	Scarlett Johansson	2:32
20.	"He's Into Me"	Cliff Eidelman	2:24
Total length:			70:24

Notes

- Although Scarlett Johansson is seen singing in her last scene of the film, the song she performs is not actually heard.
- Eidelman's score cue is not included on the physical song CD; it is only part of its download release.
- "Girlfriend" by Crystal Kay, featuring BoA, is the theme song for the Japanese dub of the film.

=== Chart performance ===
Chart (2009)	Peak position
US Billboard 200	121
US Top Soundtracks (Billboard)	7

== He's Just Not That into You (Original Motion Picture Score) ==
He's Just Not That into You (Original Motion Picture Score)

Film score by Cliff Eidelman
- Released: February 17, 2009
- Recorded: 2008–2009
- Studios: Newman Scoring Stage, 20th Century Fox Studios, Los Angeles
- Genre: Film score
- Length: 31:55
- Label: New Line
- Producer: Cliff Eidelman

Cliff Eidelman chronology
The Sisterhood of the Traveling Pants (2005)	He's Just Not That into You (2009)	Big Miracle (2012)

The score for He's Just Not That into You was composed by Cliff Eidelman, who recorded his score with an 80-piece ensemble of the Hollywood Studio Symphony at the Newman Scoring Stage. New Line Records released a score album on February 17, 2009.

=== Critical reception ===
Christian Clemmensen of Filmtracks wrote "though, He's Just Not That Into You is just not that easy to get into, its nebulous personality not connecting until that one finale highlight."

=== Track listing ===
No.	Title	Length
1.	"Prologue/The Signs"	2:39
2.	"Mixed Messages"	0:57
3.	"This Other Woman"	1:19
4.	"Not to Be Trusted"	1:55
5.	"No Exceptions"	2:05
6.	"Sailing"	1:27
7.	"The Love of Your Life"	1:16
8.	"Are You Going to Marry Me"	1:32
9.	"Mary at the Blade"	0:42
10.	"The Pool"	1:12
11.	"He's Into Me"	2:24
12.	"You Don't Fall in Love That Way"	2:07
13.	"Tables Turn on Alex"	0:56
14.	"Janine Revealed"	2:43
15.	"Beth's New Day"	1:38
16.	"Anna's Truth"	0:54
17.	"Will You Marry Me"	3:07
18.	"End Credit Suite"	3:03
Total length:		31:56

=== Credits ===
Credits adapted from liner notes:

- Music composer and producer – Cliff Eidelman
- Recording and mixing – Dennis Sands
- Assistant recording – Matt Lapoint
- Digital recordist – Adam Olmsted
- Mastering – Stephen Marsh
- Score editor – Will Kaplan
- Executive producer – Ken Kwapis
- Copyist – Julian Bratolyubov
- Art direction – Sandeep Sriram
- Liner notes – Ken Kwapis
- Music business affairs executives – Keith Zajic, Lori Blackstone
- Executive in charge of music for New Line Cinema – Erin Scully
- Executive in charge of music for New Line Records – Jason Linn

Orchestra

- Orchestrators – Cliff Eidelman, Patrick Russ, Penka Kouneya Schweiger
- Conductor – Cliff Eidelman
- Orchestra contractor – David Low
- Concertmaster – Rene Mandell

Instruments

- Bass – Chris Kollgaard, Drew Dembowski, Ed Meares, Frances Liu, Oscar Hidalgo, David Parmeter
- Bassoon – Rose Corrigan
- Cello – Armen Ksajikian, Dennis Karmazyn, Erica Duke-Kirkpatrick, Tim Landauer, Trevor Handy, Vanessa Freebarin Smith, Victor Lawrence,Steve Erdody
- Clarinet – Gary Bovyer, Mike Grego, Phil O'Connor
- Flute – Dave Shostac, Jim Walker
- Guitar – George Doering
- Harp – Marcia Dickstein
- Horn – Jim Thatcher, Rick Todd
- Oboe – Tom Boyd
- Percussion – Alan Estes, Brian Kilgore, Dan Greco, Wade Culbreath
- Piano – Bryan Pezzone
- Viola – Alma Fernandez, Andrew Duckles, Andrew Picken, Darrin Mcann, David Walther, Matt Funes, Robert Berg, Robert Brophy, Roland Kato, Brian Dembow
- Violin – Agnes Gottschewski, Aimee Kreston, Alyssa Park, Ana Landauer, Anatoly Rosinsky, Armen Anassian, Charlie Bisharat, Eun Mee Ahn, Franklyn D'Antonio, Grace Oh, Jackie Brand, Jinny Leem, Josefina Vergara, Julie Gigante, Kevin Connolly, Lorand Lokuszta, Maia Jasper, Mark Robertson, Miwako Watanabe, Phillip Levy, Radu Pieptea, Rafael Rishik, Roberto Cani, Roger Wilkie, Shalini Vijayan, Songa Lee, Sungil Lee, Susan Rishik, Tammy Hatwan, Rene Mandell
