= Hang It Up =

Single by The Ting Tings

from the album Sounds from Nowheresville
- Released: 27 December 2011
- Recorded: 2011
- Genre: Funk rock, dance-punk, rap rock
- Length: 3:10
- Label: Columbia
- Songwriters: Katie White, Jules De Martino

The Ting Tings singles chronology
"Hands" (2010)	"Hang It Up" (2011)	"Hit Me Down Sonny" (2012)

Music video
- "Hang It Up" on YouTube

"Hang It Up" is a song by English musical duo The Ting Tings, released as the lead single from their second studio album Sounds from Nowheresville. It was released as a download on 27 December 2011.

== Release ==
The song was released as a remix single and four of the remixes are included on the deluxe edition of the Sounds from Nowheresville album. Two of these remixes are submissions from the 'Show Us Yours' competition that was held in conjunction with their 2011 UK Tour which allowed fans to create both original artwork and their own remixes of 'Hang It Up'.

=== Uses in Media ===
The song was featured in the episode "Gone Maybe Gone" of Gossip Girl.

== Music video ==
The video for "Hang It Up" was uploaded to the band's YouTube channel on 18 October 2011. The video was filmed in Alicante, Spain and shows the duo performing the song in a skateboard park. A video of The Ting Tings performing "Hang It Up" live in Paris was uploaded to the band's YouTube channel on 11 November 2011.

== Samples ==
The main drum sample comes from "The Big Beat", a song by Billy Squier from 1980.

== Track listing ==
Digital download
No.	Title	Length
1.	"Hang It Up"	3:10

iTunes Remixes EP
No.	Title	Length
1.	"Hang It Up" (Inertia Remix)	3:58
2.	"Hang It Up" (Abacus & Vargas 'Predator' Remix)	3:34
3.	"Hang It Up" (CKB Remix)	5:56
4.	"Hang It Up" (Shook Remix)	4:37
5.	"Hang It Up" (Vanguard Remix)	3:11

== Chart performance ==
Chart (2012)	Peak position
Belgium (Ultratip Bubbling Under Wallonia)	37
Hong Kong (Metro Radio)	1
Japan Hot 100 (Billboard)	8
Japan Hot Overseas (Billboard)	2
South Korea International Singles (Gaon)	10

== Release history ==
Country	Date	Format	Label
United Kingdom	December 27, 2011	Digital download	Sony Music Entertainment, Columbia
