= Supercritical =

Supercritical may refer to:

- Supercritical, above the critical point in thermodynamics
- Supercritical fluid, a substance at a temperature and pressure above its liquid-vapor critical point
- Supercritical flow, where flow velocity is larger than wave velocity
- Supercriticality, the state in which a nuclear chain reaction is self-sustaining and growing
- Supercritical mass, a mass of fissile material that exceeds the critical mass
- Super Critical, a 2014 music album by the Ting Tings

== See also ==
- Hopf bifurcation, in mathematics, a local bifurcation; when the first Lyapunov coefficient is negative, the bifurcation is called supercritical
- Pitchfork bifurcation, in mathematics, similar to Hopf bifurcation
- Supersonic speed
