= Be the One (The Ting Tings song) =

Single by The Ting Tings

from the album We Started Nothing
- Released: 13 October 2008
- Genre: pop
- Length: 2:58 (album version); 2:52 (single mix)
- Label: Columbia
- Songwriter(s): Jules De Martino, Katie White
- Producer(s): Jules De Martino

The Ting Tings singles chronology
"Shut Up and Let Me Go" (2008)	"Be the One" (2008)	"We Walk" (2009)

Music video
- "Be the One" on YouTube

"Be the One" is a song by English duo The Ting Tings from their 2008 debut album We Started Nothing. A pop ballad, the song was described as more restrained and gentle than the group's previous singles, with keyboards and synthesizers central to the song's instrumentation. It also drew multiple stylistic comparisons to Blondie.

Upon its release, the song drew praise from music critics, several of whom deemed it a highlight of its parent album. They also commended the group's new style and tone, as well as the song's evocation of musicians of the 1980s and 1990s. The single became the group's third top 30 entry in the United Kingdom, as well as peaking within the top 20 in Scotland and the Czech Republic, becoming tied for the group's highest-charting single in the latter country.

== Composition ==
"Be the One" is a pop ballad written in the key of E Major with a tempo of 149 beats per minute. Its length is two minutes and fifty-six seconds. It has been described as sounding more calm and restrained than the group's previous singles, such as "That's Not My Name" and "Shut Up and Let Me Go", with singer Kate White's vocal in particular being described as "surprisingly gentle". The song features "warm" synthesizers, as well as a keyboard in the chorus. It has been described as a sad-sounding, "cute little ballad", as well as sounding "dreamy" and "melancholic and melodic in equal measure". The Buffalo News described the song as one of the "few emotional moments" on We Started Nothing. In the chorus, White sings "I don't wanna be the one making all the noise."

Its musical style has been compared to that of Blondie, with the melody and the keyboard drawing comparison to the group's "Union City Blue". It was also compared to Altered Images and the early work of the Cardigans.

== Reception ==
=== Critical ===
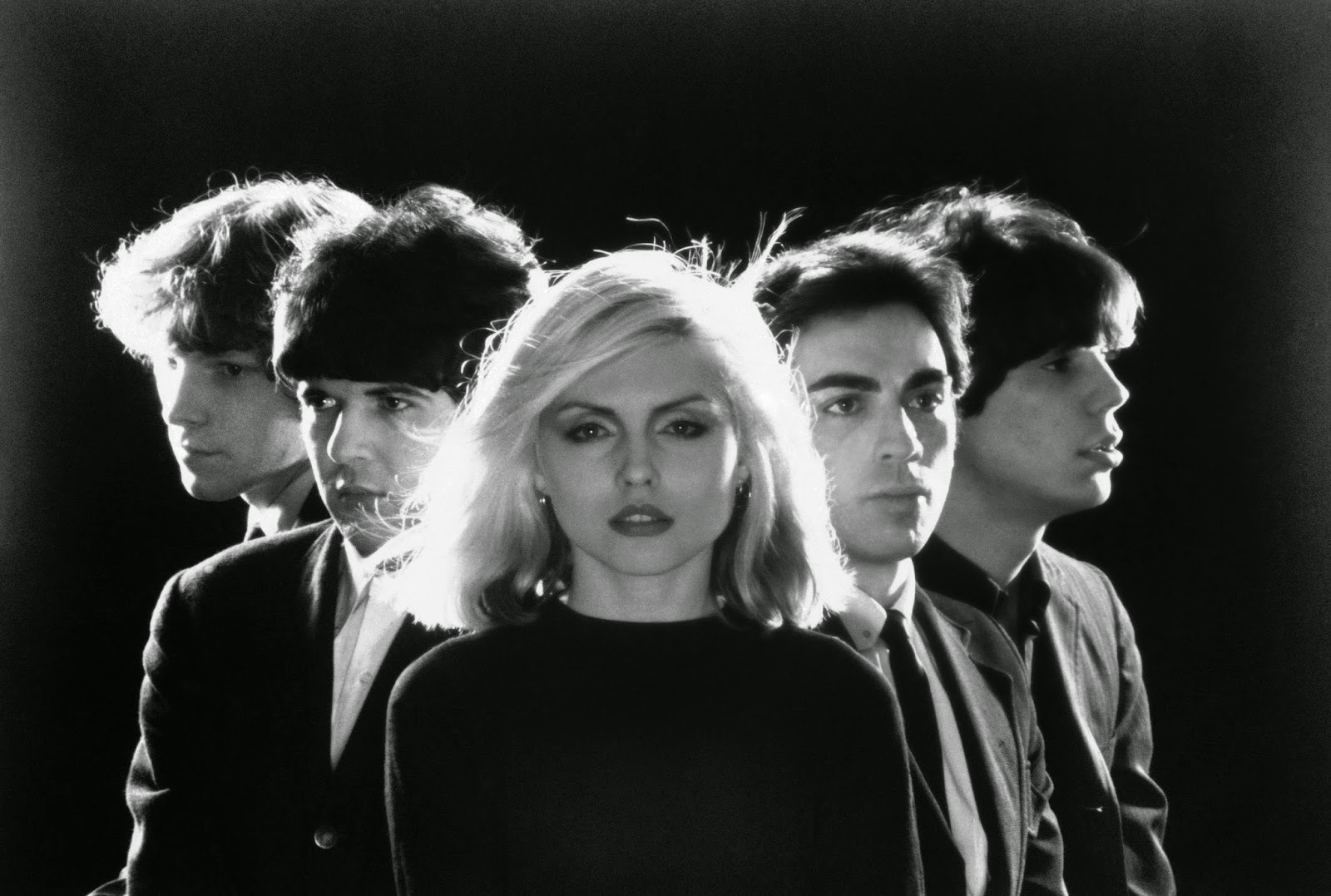
Multiple critics praised the single for its similarity to the work of Blondie (above).

An album review for Rolling Stone, penned by Michael Endelman, highlighted the song as one of We Started Nothing's examples of "peppy New Wave that's ridiculously catchy". Music critic Adam Moerder, writing for Pitchfork, commended the song as one of the better tracks on We Started Nothing, praising its "goth-twinged twee" as making "for one of the most fully fleshed-out ideas amidst a sea of half-baked inklings" on the album, although also opining that it "may not possess the immediacy" to qualify as a "standout track". Allmusic commended the song for "stay(ing) on the catchy side" while "ton(ing) down the Ting Tings' energy to more manageable but still lively levels". Drowned in Sound called the track "an endearingly simplistic indie-pop head-nodder". The Daily Gazette called the song "probably the most melodically interesting… the group performed". A single review by BBC Radio 1 awarded the track four stars out of five and commended its similarities to the music of Blondie.

A review of We Started Nothing by Chris Baynes, writing for PopMatters, called the song — as well as "Keep Your Head" — "flowery nuggets of electro-pop, catchy enough to be mildly diverting but ultimately pretty hollow". Digital Spy awarded the single three out of five stars, calling it "pretty charming" and opining that White sounds "almost" "sweet and vulnerable".

=== Commercial ===
On the UK Singles chart dated 11 October 2008, "Be the One" debut at number 84, becoming the fourth single from We Started Nothing to enter the top 100. The following week, the single rose to number 46 on the chart, and in its third week attained its peak of number 28. It spent a total of one week in the top 40, peaking five spots higher than the group's previous chart entry — "Great DJ" — and becoming the group's third top 30 entry. It spent a total of five weeks on the singles chart.

In Scotland, the single debuted and peaked at number 11 on the Singles Chart dated 19 October 2008. It spent a total of seven weeks on the chart, with 30 November 2008 marking its last week on the tally. The single also charted in the Czech Republic, debuting on their radio chart in late November 2008 at number 66, and peaked at number 7 on the chart in late January 2009; it returned to its peak about a month later, and spent a total of four weeks in the top 10 and 38 weeks in the top 100. It remains tied with "That's Not My Name" as the group's highest-charting single in that country.

== Music video ==
The music video, which was directed by Keith Schofield and produced by Gina Leonard, premiered on 10 September 2008 on handbag.com. It begins with Katie White waking up in a hospital, appearing to not know how she got there and sneaking out. White is joined by Jules De Martino while walking down a back street with their friends following them wanting to hang out, but White and De Martino refuse. Also following them are large screens showing their movements. In the end, they meet up and soon drive off in a black and white car. It is soon revealed that the entire video is set in a studio in Chicago.

== Track listings ==
- UK CD single
1. "Be the One" (Single Mix) – 2:51
2. "Be the One" (Bimbo Jones Club Remix) – 7:31
- UK iTunes EP
1. "Be the One" (Single Mix) – 2:51
2. "Be the One" (Bimbo Jones Club Remix) – 7:31
3. "Be the One" (The Japanese Popstars Remix) – 5:50
- UK 7" single

A. "Be the One" (Single Mix) – 2:51
B. "Be the One" (The Japanese Popstars Remix) – 5:50

- UK iTunes Download
1. "Be the One (Live From The Islington Mill) - 3:52

== Charts ==
Chart (2008)	Peak position
Scottish Singles Chart (OCC)	11
UK Singles Chart (OCC)	28
Chart (2009)	Peak position
Czech Airplay Chart (IFPI)	7
