= The Black Light (The Ting Tings album) =

Studio album by The Ting Tings
- Released: October 26, 2018
- Genre: Drum and bass, UK garage, indie rock, indietronica
- Length: 27:37
- Label: Finca
- Producer: Jules De Martino, Jon Foster

The Ting Tings chronology
Super Critical (2014)	The Black Light (2018)	Home (2025)

Singles from The Black Light
- 1. "Blacklight" Released: 13 September 2018; 2. "Estranged" Released: 15 October 2018

The Black Light is the fourth studio album by English indie pop duo The Ting Tings. It was released on 26 October 2018 by Finca Records.

== Background and recording ==
The album was written and recorded over a two-year period mostly in Los Angeles and Spain.

During the creation of The Black Light and unlike the band's previous albums, the lyrics were written first and then put to music. Vocalist Katie White and drummer Julian De Martino initially recorded demos in Spain, with an indie rock sound styled after their heroes The Smiths and The Cure but were unhappy with this as they felt it was unrepresentative of their musical intentions for the project. They moved to Los Angeles where they built another new studio, rearranging the songs and re-recording some of the material before finding the resulting sound they searched for.

The resulting album became a departure for Ting Tings, having a darker and melancholic sound than the band’s previous albums. The Black Light explores themes like complicated relationships, inner turmoil, and dead loved ones.

== Release and promotion ==
Singles "Blacklight" and "Estranged" were released ahead of the album, both accompanied by music videos. The album was released on vinyl and digitally, but did not feature a CD version in both the band’s native UK and US.

Seven remixes of the songs from the album were released digitally from October 2018 through March 2019.

A limited edition black USB memory stick with an alternative stripped-down version of the album subtitled 'Manchester Versions' and a collection of remixes were released in March 2019.

A standalone digital release of The Black Light (Manchester Versions) took place in July 2019.

== Critical reception ==
Professional ratings
Review scores
Source	Rating
Dork	2/5 stars
Northern Transmissions	6.5/10 stars

The Black Light received mixed reviews from music critics and less media coverage compared to the band's previous albums.

Alex Cabré of Dork magazine wrote that 'In short, the album feels unfinished.", "Intended as a minimalist dance effort, 'The Black Light' mostly comes across as muted and half-arsed."

NME reviewer Jordan Bassett expressed bewilderment with the lead single. "Comeback single 'Blacklight' is not The Ting Tings – aka 35-year-old singer and guitarist Katie White and 49-year-old drummer Jules De Martino – as we remember them. It’s not the funky disco strut of 'Shut Up And Let Me Go', nor the multi-coloured, perky indie-pop stomp of 'That’s Not My Name'". "It’s both unbelievably dated and completely alien, in a way that makes you wonder: What were they thinking? How did this seem like a plausible comeback?"

Owen Maxwell of Northern Transmissions wrote that "Ting Tings always managed to sound distinct no matter the genre. However, after a notable break between records, their latest effort sees the Ting Tings sounding unoriginal and lacking their usual fun. Though it’s great that they’re trying to keep changing up, they end up missing the mark and feeling like they’re trying too hard to be something else."

Despite the lack of initial recognition, in 2023 classicrockhistory.com rated the songs "Estranged" and "Blacklight" as #8 and #10 respectively in their list of Top 10 Ting Tings songs.

== Track listing ==
All tracks are written by Jules De Martino and Katie White.

No.	Title	Length
1.	"Estranged"	5:11
2.	"Basement"	2:16
3.	"A&E"	4:03
4.	"Blacklight"	2:45
5.	"Earthquake"	4:31
6.	"Fine & Dandy"	4:31
7.	"Word for This"	3:16
8.	"Good Grief"	3:04
Total length:		27:37

Bonus track on the vinyl and Japanese editions
No.	Title	Length
9.	"Souvenir"	4:17
Total length:		31:54

Manchester Versions tracklisting
No.	Title	Length
1.	"Estranged" (Manchester Version)	5:56
2.	"Basement" (Manchester Version)	3:15
3.	"A&E" (Manchester Version)	4:10
4.	"Blacklight" (Manchester Version)	2:50
5.	"Earthquake" (Manchester Version)	3:52
6.	"Fine & Dandy" (Manchester Version)	4:06
7.	"Word for This" (Manchester Version)	2:58
8.	"Good Grief" (Manchester Version)	2:50
9.	"Souvenir" (Manchester Version)	4:28
Total length:		32:25

Bonus remixes on the Black USB release
No.	Title	Length
1.	"Blacklight (Leeroy Thornhill Dirty & Ruff Remix)"	4:46
2.	"Blacklight (Tuff Ghost Remix)"	3:50
3.	"Blacklight (Niahm Remix)" (feat. Nizhm)	3:15
4.	"A&E (IYEARA Remix)" (feat. IYEARA)	3:58
5.	"Earthquake (Blackpaw Remix)" (feat. BLACKPAW)	3:12
6.	"Basement (Boixy Remix)"	2:22
7.	"Fine & Dandy (DoubleD Remix)" (feat. DoubleD)	3:42
