= Wrong Club =

Single by The Ting Tings

from the album Super Critical
- Released: 15 August 2014
- Genre: Disco
- Length: 3:19
- Label: Finca Records
- Songwriters: Katie White; Julian de Martino; Andy Taylor
- Producers: Julian de Martino; Andy Taylor

The Ting Tings singles chronology
"Hit Me Down Sonny" (2012)	"Wrong Club" (2014)	"Do It Again" (2014)

Music video
- "Wrong Club" on YouTube

"Wrong Club" is a song by British duo The Ting Tings and their first single off of their third studio album, Super Critical. It was well received by music critics, who praised the song's disco feel. The song reached #2 on Billboard's Dance Club Songs chart, also entering the Adult Top 40 and Japan Hot 100.

== Background and release ==
Katie White, the band's lead singer, told Entertainment Weekly that "The song’s about being in the club at four in the morning, when everything you’ve taken has worn off and you’ve just realized what a shitty club you’re in, and what terrible music. I think everyone’s been there. You’re not drunk anymore and you’ve got beer all down you and you’re just re-evaluating your life."

The song was released on 3 June 2014 via an audio video on YouTube. On the same day, Billboard published an article announcing the song's release. On 15 August the song was officially announced as the lead single from Super Critical.

The song was featured in an episode of Roadies.

== Critical reception ==
Jason Lipshutz of Billboard gave the song a highly positive review, calling it "euphoric" and saying it was "a single that shimmies forward with the disco thump of Daft Punk's mega-hit 'Get Lucky.'"

== Music video ==
A music video for "Wrong Club," directed by Lisa Paclet, was released on 14 July 2014; the video features Kate White dancing in a loft-like setting, with lasers hitting her from time to time.

== Chart performance ==
"Wrong Club" debuted on the Billboard Dance Club Songs chart on 24 January 2015. It reached its No. 2 peak on 21 March and spent a total of five weeks in the Top 10. The song also did well on Billboard's Adult Top 40 chart, on which it spent 11 weeks and reached No. 28. The song also charted in Japan, where it reached No. 45; it spent a total of 3 weeks on Japan's Hot 100.

== Tracklisting ==
Digital download
No.	Title	Length
1.	"Wrong Club"	3:19

iTunes Remixes EP
No.	Title	Length
1.	"Wrong Club" (Tom Stephan Vocal Mix)	6:55
2.	"Wrong Club" (Tom Stephan Dub Mix)	6:40
3.	"Wrong Club" (Club Mix By The Super Criticals)	7:22
4.	"Wrong Club" (Vision II Remix by Boix)	3:55

The BXY Remixes
No.	Title	Length
1.	"Do It Again" (BXY Remix)	7:15
2.	"Wrong Club" (BXY Remix)	7:17

== Charts ==
=== Weekly charts ===
Chart (2014–15)	Peak position
Japan Hot Overseas (Billboard)	7
Netherlands (Dutch Top 40 Tipparade)	14
US Adult Pop Airplay (Billboard)	28
US Dance Club Songs (Billboard)	2

=== Year-end charts ===
Chart (2015)	Position
US Dance Club Songs (Billboard)	49
