= We Walk =

Single by The Ting Tings

from the album We Started Nothing
- Released: 23 February 2009
- Genre: Indie pop; new wave
- Length: 4:04
- Label: Columbia
- Songwriters: Jules De Martino; Katie White
- Producer: Jules De Martino

The Ting Tings singles chronology
"Be the One" (2008)	"We Walk" (2009)	"Hands" (2010)

Music video
- "We Walk" on YouTube

"We Walk" is a song by English duo The Ting Tings from their debut studio album, We Started Nothing (2008). It was released as the album's seventh and final single on 23 February 2009. "Fruit Machine" was originally set to be released two weeks before the release of "We Walk" as a download-only single; however, this was cancelled.

== Critical reception ==
Tony Robert Whyte of Drowned in Sound wrote that "We Walk" is "a lush ballad in hiding that's too scared to show its true spots for fear it'll be laughed out of town by cool-as indie types, its incessant cowbell effects eventually tiring the attention despite the album's most heartfelt vocal from White."

Alexis Petridis of The Guardian stated that the song "prove[s] White and De Martino can do glossy and depthless at will, but pop perfection comes less easily."

Aaron Bliss in the Daily Music Guide review wrote that "[the song] could still prove to be a Radio 1 staple by virtue of its undeniable catchiness. It’s not outstanding, but as disposable art-pop goes, it deserves a listen."

== Music video ==
The music video for "We Walk", directed by Ben Ib, features Katie White and Jules De Martino walking in a park at night, with many of their duplicates around them in frozen poses.

== Track listings ==
- UK promo CD single
1. "We Walk" (Radio Edit) – 3:31
2. "We Walk" (Instrumental) – 4:04
- UK limited 12" single

A. "We Walk" – 4:04
B1. "Fruit Machine" (Dave Spoon Televized Mix) – 5:53
B2. "Fruit Machine" (Bimbo Jones Remix) – 6:08

== Charts ==
Chart (2009)	Peak position
Australian Airplay Chart	14
Belgian Tip Chart	8
Scottish Singles Chart	10
UK Singles Chart	58
