= Super Critical =

2014 studio album by the Ting Tings

Studio album by the Ting Tings
- Released: 24 October 2014
- Recorded: 2012–2014, Ibiza and New York
- Studios: Avatar, New York City
- Genres: Disco; funk; pop
- Length: 31:38
- Label: Finca
- Producer: Andy Taylor

The Ting Tings chronology
Sounds from Nowheresville (2012)	Super Critical (2014)	The Black Light (2018)

Singles from Super Critical
- 1. "Wrong Club" Released: 15 August 2014; 2. "Do It Again" Released: 22 September 2014

Super Critical is the third studio album by English indie pop duo the Ting Tings, released on 24 October 2014 by Finca Records.

== Background and recording ==
Super Critical was written in Ibiza where the band became friends with former Duran Duran guitarist Andy Taylor. The duo rented a rural estate in the village of Santa Gertrudis, where they started writing and recording, before moving to Sonic Vista Studios with Taylor.

The album was recorded and mixed at Avatar Studios in New York City on all-analogue equipment.

The album was influenced by Madonna, the Beatles, Diana Ross, Prince, Fleetwood Mac, Talking Heads, Nile Rodgers, Blondie and 10cc.

== Release and promotion ==
"Wrong Club" was released as the lead single from the album on 15 August 2014, followed by "Do It Again" on 22 September 2014. Both songs were accompanied by music videos.

Digital versions of the album were released in late 2014, while physical editions followed in early 2015. A special version of the album with track by track commentary was released digitally alongside the regular one.

In 2015 a special 12" vinyl with remixes of "Do It Again" and "Wrong Club" by the Spanish electronic musician BXY was released.

== Critical reception ==
Professional ratings
Aggregate scores
Source	Rating
Metacritic	59/100
Review scores
Source	Rating
AllMusic	3/5 stars
The Arts Desk	1/5 stars
The Australian	4/5 stars
The Observer	2/5 stars
Q	3/5 stars
Shields Gazette	6/10
Sputnikmusic	3/5
The Times	3/5 stars
Uncut	6/10
Virgin Media	3/5 stars

Super Critical received mixed reviews from music critics. At Metacritic, which assigns a weighted mean rating out of 100 to reviews from mainstream critics, the album received an average score of 59, based on five reviews, which indicates "mixed or average reviews". Tim McNamara of The Australian called album "assured, confident and cohesive" and praised it as a "fantastic, upbeat and dance-inducing fare, signalling the resurgence of an act that has bet everything on doing their third album their way, and are set to reap the rewards." Fred Thomas of AllMusic wrote, "Though not quite as boisterous and immediate as their debut and nowhere as stylistically restless as Sounds from Nowheresville, the songs here slowly sink in and last a lot longer than anything else the band has done prior", yet concluded that "the maturation on Super Critical takes them out of the 'overbearing pop flash in the pan' category and suggests they may have even more interesting statements ahead of them."

Ed Potton of The Times found Super Critical to be "breezier and more coherent [than Sounds from Nowheresville], sticking mainly to the kind of insouciant disco-funk-pop that [the Ting Tings] do so well." Sputnikmusic's Raul Stanciu viewed the album as "a short and rather sweet effort that might not launch them to the top of the charts once again, but at least confirms us they're not yet ready to fade into obscurity", while commending The Ting Tings for "creating a consistent record that not only manages to mend the damage done by its faulty predecessor, but also create a coherent, fun atmosphere." Virgin Media's Matthew Horton felt that "what Super Critical misses is one really great tune. The closest it comes is 'Green Poison''s soulful grind, strangely reminiscent of Stock Aitken & Waterman's 'Roadblock', yet no cigar. Otherwise this is just frothy fun, which is fine—but only fine." Alex Lai of Contactmusic.com stated that "A return to the popularity that greeted their initial breakthrough isn't likely, but there's more than enough here to repair their reputation and ensure they shouldn't be seen as a flash-in-the-pan act."

Stephen Dalton of Uncut wrote, "With echoes of prime-time Chic, Prince and Madonna, the intent is admirable even if too many of the songs feel flimsy and pedestrian", but described the songs "Communication" and "Failure" as "unabashedly gorgeous blasts of sugardipped synth-funk hedonism." Despite stating that the album "actually isn't all that bad, and certainly marks an improvement on its disastrous predecessor, Songs from Nowheresville", the Shields Gazette commented that "there's here nothing which leaves any lasting impression." Dorian Lynskey of Q magazine noted that Super Critical "sounds less petulant but no more likely to return [the duo] to the Top 10", adding that it "would be a solid album for someone like Annie, For The Ting Tings, though, it suggests there's no way back from Nowheresville." The Observer's Killian Fox opined that the duo "can still write a catchy tune [...] but these songs are all surface, with only the odd hook to snag us." Guy Oddy of The Arts Desk panned the album, dubbing it a "disappointment" and expressing that "it's not wholly clear whether the Ting Tings have become cultural commentators, like Negativland without samplers, and Super Critical is a prank about the vacuousness of so much chart pop, or whether they've committed commercial suicide."

== Track listing ==
All tracks are written by Jules De Martino, Katie White, and Andy Taylor.

No.	Title	Length
1.	"Super Critical"	3:32
2.	"Daughter"	3:15
3.	"Do It Again"	3:52
4.	"Wrong Club"	4:14
5.	"Wabi Sabi"	3:31
6.	"Only Love"	3:10
7.	"Communication"	3:35
8.	"Green Poison"	3:49
9.	"Failure"	2:37
Total length:		31:35

Japanese edition bonus tracks
No.	Title	Length
10.	"Wrong Club" (Club Mix by The Super Criticals)	7:22
11.	"Do It Again" (Club Mix by The Super Criticals)	4:08

2015 reissue edition bonus tracks
No.	Title	Length
10.	"Do It Again" (Acoustic)	5:23
11.	"Wrong Club" (Acoustic)	4:54

== Charts ==
Chart performance for Super Critical
Chart (2014)	Peak position
Belgian Albums (Ultratop Wallonia)	172
Japanese Albums (Oricon)	100
UK Albums (Official Charts)	111
UK Independent Albums (Official Charts)	21

== Release history ==
Release dates and formats for Super Critical
Region	Date	Format(s)	Label	Ref(s)
Australia	24 October 2014	CD; digital download	Liberator	
Germany	24 October 2014	CD; digital download	PIAS; Finca	
Ireland	24 October 2014	CD; digital download	Finca	
France	27 October 2014	Digital download	Finca	
United Kingdom	27 October 2014	CD; digital download	Finca	
United States	27 October 2014	Digital download	PIAS; Finca	
Japan	29 October 2014	CD; digital download	Sony	
France	3 November 2014	CD	Finca	
Germany	21 November 2014	LP	PIAS; Finca	
France	24 November 2014	LP	Finca	
United Kingdom	24 November 2014	LP	Finca	
United States	13 January 2015	CD	PIAS; Finca	
