= That's Not My Name =

2007 single by the Ting Tings

- Re-release picture sleeve

Single by the Ting Tings

from the album We Started Nothing
- A-side: "Great DJ" (double A-side)
- B-side: "Shut Up and Let Me Go"
- Released: 28 May 2007
- Genre: Electropop
- Length: 5:11 (album version); 3:45 (international radio edit); 3:28 (US radio edit); 3:17 (UK radio edit)
- Label: Switchflicker; Columbia
- Songwriters: Jules De Martino; Katie White
- Producer: Jules De Martino

The Ting Tings UK singles chronology
"That's Not My Name" / "Great DJ" (2007)	"Fruit Machine" (2007)

The Ting Tings US singles chronology
"Shut Up and Let Me Go" (2008)	"That's Not My Name" (2009)

Music video
- "That's Not My Name" on YouTube

"That's Not My Name" is a song by British musical duo the Ting Tings, released as their debut single. The song was originally issued as a double A-side with "Great DJ" by independent record label Switchflicker Records on 28 May 2007. After heavy promotion from BBC Radio 1 and the NME, the single was re-released individually on 12 May 2008 on Columbia Records. It was later included on their first studio album, We Started Nothing (2008).

Following the Columbia re-release, "That's Not My Name" debuted atop the UK Singles Chart. The song was a sleeper hit in North America, peaking within the top 40 of the charts in the United States in August 2009. The single has sold over a million digital copies.

== Composition ==
"That's Not My Name" is written in the key of E major with a tempo of 145 beats per minute. The vocals in the song span from G_{3} to G♯_{5}.

Vocalist Katie White stated that the song was written "with me ranting about my frustrations with the record industry." In a separate interview, Jules De Martino, the other songwriter and vocalist, explained: "Katie and I were playing loads of gigs in Manchester in a band called Dear Eskiimo. We’d got a deal with Mercury. They had committed to an album, but then suddenly changed all their top people and we got dumped. I remember thinking: “Bastards.” No one would answer the phone to us. We felt invisible and rejected. That's what the lyrics to That's Not My Name are all about: “They call me Stacey / They call me Her / They call me Jane / That’s not my name.”

== Music videos ==
The song has three music videos, all of which are live action. The first features the Ting Tings with white background, performing the song on a set, with alternating scenes of White with blue and red backgrounds. This version of the video was used to promote the song and album upon its 2007 release. The video was directed by Sophie Muller and Stacey Hartly and is visually similar to the video for Toni Basil's "Mickey". By November 2023 the video had gained more than 82 million views on YouTube.

Columbia produced a 2008 video for the US release, directed by David Allain and with the band performing a different set, with more equipment and flashing lights in the background. The video premiered on mtvu.com on 26 January 2009. Another video was made for the acoustic version. The third music video, known as the alternate video, was directed by AlexandLiane and features the Ting Tings in a desert ghost town. Double Dutchers, cheerleaders, marching band drummers and sign spinners come out from the woods wearing black clothes with reflective material. The Ting Tings perform the song, while behind them the double dutchers skip rope, the cheerleaders cheer, the drummers drum, and the sign spinners spin signs featuring the names from the song's lyrics.

== Reception ==
=== Critical ===
The single received favourable reviews from critics upon re-release, with the NME describing it as "no-flab electro-pop nugget", while Q magazine described it as "a snatch of Hey Mickey-style handclaps and a gobbily staccato vocal, stitched together to fashion a groove that's as instant and familiar". Digital Spy compared the single to a "well-shaken can of cola", and added "[the track is] brimming with sticky, yummy, fizzy goodness".

=== Commercial ===
In the United Kingdom, the single entered at the top of the UK Singles Chart on 18 May 2008 – for the week ending dated 24 May 2008 – ending Madonna and Justin Timberlake's four-week reign at the top with "4 Minutes". The following week, however, it slipped to number two after Rihanna's "Take a Bow" climbed to number one. In Ireland, it peaked at number two for five consecutive weeks.

In Australia, after slowly rising up the singles chart, it eventually peaked inside the top 10, and was certified Platinum in 2009. On the Australian Physical Singles Chart, it peaked at 20, and on the Australian Digital track chart at number eight. In the United States, "That's Not My Name" peaked at number 39 on the Billboard Hot 100, giving the band their first top 40 there. The song was certified Gold on 2 April 2009, selling over 500,000 copies.

== Covers and usage in media ==
Dizzee Rascal performed a version of this song in the Live Lounge on BBC Radio 1, changing the chorus to: "They call me 'blood'/ They call me 'rude boy'/They call me oi/They call me mate/ ...They use the 'N-word' like it's a game/ That's not my name..." During the Pittsburgh Penguins' Stanley Cup run in 2009, Pittsburgh radio station WDVE did a spoof of the song titled "That Is My Name" about Penguins player Evgeni Malkin, in which a man sounding like Malkin sang about his multiple nicknames. The song was also parodied as "He's Got My Name" for Cartoon Network's Johnny Test. Additionally, the song was used in a parody music video by Norwegian comedy duo Ylvis on their talk show I kveld med YLVIS (Tonight with YLVIS), titled "Jeg Heter Finn" ("My Name Is Finn").

The instrumental of the track was used in a UK cinema advert for BBC Radio 1 during the summer of 2008. A remixed version of the song was also used as the music for the PINK segment of the 2008 Victoria's Secret Fashion Show (remixed by Cho Dongho). The song is also used in Slovenian mobile operator Mobitel's commercial for their subscription package, Itak Džabest. "That's Not My Name" was used in the trailer for the 2009 summer film Post Grad, and on the shows 90210 on The CW, Brothers & Sisters on ABC, Taking the Stage, and The City on MTV, as well as in the films Fired Up! (2009) and Horrible Bosses (2011), in which Charlie Day's character Dale sang it in a car while on cocaine. The song was featured in CSI: NY as track of the beginning of the episode "Point of No Return". The song was also used on the Skins series 3 episode "Katie and Emily". This song often appears in the E4 sitcom The Inbetweeners and appeared in The Inbetweeners Movie (official soundtrack). Furthermore, the song was featured in Suburgatory. American avant-garde and experimental band Xiu Xiu used lines from "That's Not My Name" in a cover of "Only Girl (In The World)" by Rihanna. The lines were altered to say "You call me Jamie, that's not my name." The song is also available as a playable map on the rhythm video game Just Dance 2.

The song was also used in commercials and advertisements for Despicable Me 2, Joe Fresh, The Lego Movie, Coca-Cola, and Amazon Alexa. It has also been used in the films La Famille Bélier, Gnome Alone, Peter Rabbit 2: The Runaway, and Nimona. The Israeli TV series Ha-Yehudim Ba'im used the song as a basis for a satire regarding the Jewish law forbidding the pronunciation of the tetragrammaton, where God complains about calling him with various names that are not truly His.

On 15 January 2022, the song first went viral on TikTok when it appeared on videos among famous pet accounts. Four days later, on the 19th, famous actors such as Alicia Silverstone and Drew Barrymore began to post videos using the song set to photos of their previous notable roles.

The 2023 film Meg 2: The Trench features a version of the song with lyrics sung in Thai language by the actress and singer Pimprapa Tangprabhaporn.

The 17 June 2024 episode of The Late Show with Stephen Colbert opened with a spoof called "That's Not His Name," set to a supercut of Donald Trump mispronouncing names and words.

On 25 November 2025, K-pop group Illit released a version called "Not Me", with a music video.

== Track listings ==
UK 7"

1. "That's Not My Name" – 3:17
2. "TNMN Your Mix" – 5:03

UK CD

1. "That's Not My Name" – 5:11
2. "That's Not My Name" (Soul Seekerz Radio Mix) – 3:22

Digital EP

1. "That's Not My Name" – 5:11
2. "That's Not My Name" (Soul Seekerz Radio Mix) – 3:22
3. "TNMN Your Mix" – 5:03
4. "That's Not My Name" (Live from the Mill) – 5:24

Remix Bundle

1. "That's Not My Name" (L.A. Riots Remix) – 5:47
2. "That's Not My Name" (Soul Seekerz Club Mix) – 7:10
3. "That's Not My Name" (Soul Seekerz Dirty Radio Remix) – 3:14
4. "That's Not My Name" (Soul Seekerz Dirty Dub No Vox Mix) – 6:46
5. "That's Not My Name" (Tom Neville's Nameless Vocal Dub) – 7:20
6. "That's Not My Name" (Tom Neville's Nameless Vocal Mix) – 7:32

Skeet & Tito Remix

1. "That's Not My Name" (Skeet & Tito Remix) (feat. Wale) – 4:12

== Charts ==
=== Weekly charts ===
Weekly chart performance
Chart (2008–2009)	Peak position
Australia (ARIA)	8
Austria (Ö3 Austria Top 40)	34
Belgium (Ultratop 50 Flanders)	48
Canada Hot 100 (Billboard)	57
Croatia (HRT)	10
Denmark (Tracklisten)	10
Europe (Eurochart Hot 100)	5
Germany (GfK)	42
Ireland (IRMA)	2
Netherlands (Single Top 100)	59
New Zealand (Recorded Music NZ)	8
Scottish Singles Sales (Official Charts)	1
Sweden (Sverigetopplistan)	23
Switzerland (Schweizer Hitparade)	44
UK Singles (Official Charts)	1
US Billboard Hot 100	39
US Adult Pop Airplay (Billboard)	30
US Alternative Airplay (Billboard)	32
US Dance Club Songs (Billboard)	4
US Pop Airplay (Billboard)	17
US Rhythmic Airplay (Billboard)	38

=== Year-end charts ===
Annual chart rankings
Chart (2008)	Position
Australia (ARIA)	48
Europe (Eurochart Hot 100)	80
New Zealand (RIANZ)	50
UK Singles (OCC)	22

Chart (2009)	Rank
US Digital Song Sales (Billboard)	59

== Certifications ==
Region	Certification	Certified units/sales
Australia (ARIA)	Platinum	70,000^{^}
Denmark (IFPI Danmark)	Gold	7,500^{^}
New Zealand (RMNZ)	Platinum	30,000^{‡}
United Kingdom (BPI)	Platinum	600,000^{‡}
United States (RIAA)	Platinum	1,000,000^{*}
^{*} Sales figures based on certification alone.^{^} Shipments figures based on certification alone.^{‡} Sales+streaming figures based on certification alone.

== Release history ==
Region	Date	Format	Label	Ref(s).
United Kingdom	28 May 2007	7-inch vinyl	Switchflicker	
United Kingdom	12 May 2008	Digital download	Sony BMG	
Australia	1 September 2008	CD single	Sony BMG	
United States	13 October 2008	Alternative radio	Columbia	
United States	11 November 2008	Digital download (L.A. Riots remix)	Sony BMG	
United States	27 January 2009	Contemporary hit radio	Columbia	
United States	3 February 2009	Digital download (remix bundle)	Sony	
United States	8 September 2009	Digital download (Skeet & Tito remix featuring Wale)	Sony	
