= Shut Up and Let Me Go =

2008 single by the Ting Tings

Single by the Ting Tings

from the album We Started Nothing
- Released: 21 July 2008
- Length: 2:54
- Label: Columbia
- Songwriters: Jules De Martino; Katie White
- Producer: Jules De Martino

The Ting Tings UK singles chronology
"That's Not My Name" (2008)	"Shut Up and Let Me Go" (2008)	"Be the One" (2008)

The Ting Tings US singles chronology
"Great DJ" (2008)	"Shut Up and Let Me Go" (2008)	"That's Not My Name" (2009)

Music video
- "Shut Up and Let Me Go" on YouTube

"Shut Up and Let Me Go" is the fifth single from English musical duo the Ting Tings' debut studio album, We Started Nothing (2008). The song was released in the United Kingdom on 21 July 2008, and was the follow-up to the number one hit single "That's Not My Name". The song was added to the coveted A-list of BBC Radio 1's playlist, and has received a substantial amount of airplay during the day on the station. The single peaked at number six in both the UK Singles Chart and the UK Download Chart.

After featuring in a successful Apple iPod advertisement in April 2008, "Shut Up and Let Me Go" was soon released in the US on 15 April and was The Ting Tings' first single to chart on the Billboard Hot 100 Singles Chart. The song was number 27 on Rolling Stone's list of the 100 Best Songs of 2008.

== Music video ==
The video for "Shut Up and Let Me Go" was directed by Alex and Liane for Factory Films. The video, filmed in one day, features The Ting Tings performing kung fu and uses a variety of hand gestures to transition from scene to scene.

Directors Alex and Liane described the video as "a bit over-ambitious" because of its fight scenes which "were just so time consuming to get right". The various hand gestures were inspired by the Neoist art movement. The video premiered on MTV in America on 13 June 2008. It was nominated for 2008 MTV Video Music Awards for Video of the Year, but lost to Britney Spears' "Piece of Me" and won for Best UK Video.

== Chart performance ==
"Shut Up and Let Me Go" was released in the United States on 15 April 2008. The song debuted on the Billboard Hot 100 at number 93 on 17 May 2008. The following week it reached its peak position at number 55. The song was certified Gold in America with sales of over 500,000 on 14 October 2008. In Canada, the song reached number 29 and remained on the Hot 100 chart for six weeks.

"Shut Up and Let Me Go" debuted at number 49 on the UK Singles Chart. The following week the song peaked at number 29. Two weeks later, the song fell out of the chart, but on 29 June 2008 the song re-entered the chart at number 24 and peaked at number six. Even though "Shut Up and Let Me Go" peaked lower than "That's Not My Name", the song showed great longevity by remaining in the Top 40 for many weeks.

In Australia, the single has debuted at number 79 on 10 November.

== Track listings ==
US digital download

1. "Shut Up and Let Me Go"

UK CD 1

1. "Shut Up and Let Me Go"
2. "Shut Up and Let Me Go" (Haji and Emanuel Remix)

UK CD 2

1. "Shut Up and Let Me Go"
2. "Shut Up and Let Me Go" (Tocadisco Love the Old School Mix)

7-inch yellow vinyl

1. "Shut Up and Let Me Go"
2. "Shut Up and Let Me Go" (Tocadisco Love the Old School Mix)

UK remixes CD

1. "Shut Up and Let Me Go" (Tom Neville's Keep It Quiet Remix)
2. "Shut Up and Let Me Go" (Chris Lake Remix)
3. "Shut Up and Let Me Go" (Haji & Emanuel Remix)
4. "Shut Up and Let Me Go" (Tocadisco Love the Old School Mix)

== Personnel ==
- Jules De Martino – drums, keyboards, percussion, production, vocals
- Katie White – vocals, guitar
- Sam Beckwith – synths
- Sarah Templeman – bass guitar
- Dave Sardy – mixing

== Charts ==
=== Weekly charts ===
Chart (2008–2013)	Peak position
Australia (ARIA)	44
Australian Club Chart (ARIA) Haji & Emanuel Remix	22
Austria (Ö3 Austria Top 40)	52
Belgium (Ultratop 50 Flanders)	31
Belgium (Ultratop 50 Wallonia)	29
Canada (Canadian Hot 100)	29
France (SNEP)	152
Germany (GfK)	43
Ireland (IRMA)	9
Mexico Anglo (Monitor Latino)	1
Netherlands (Dutch Top 40 Tipparade)	5
Netherlands (Single Top 100)	65
Scotland Singles (OCC)	5
South Korea International Singles (Gaon)	39
Switzerland (Schweizer Hitparade)	48
UK Singles (OCC)	6
US Billboard Hot 100	55
US Alternative Airplay (Billboard)	34
US Dance Club Songs (Billboard)	1
US Pop Airplay (Billboard)	38

=== Year-end charts ===
Chart (2008)	Position
Canada (Canadian Hot 100)	91
UK Singles (OCC)	63

== Certifications ==
Region	Certification	Certified units/sales
United Kingdom (BPI)	Silver	200,000^{*}
United States (RIAA)	Platinum	1,000,000^{*}
^{*} Sales figures based on certification alone.
