= Hands (The Ting Tings song) =

Single by The Ting Tings

from the album Sounds from Nowheresville
- Released: 11 October 2010
- Recorded: 2009–10
- Genre: Synth-pop
- Length: 3:20
- Label: Columbia
- Songwriters: Katie White; Jules De Martino
- Producer: Calvin Harris

The Ting Tings' singles chronology
"We Walk" (2009)	"Hands" (2010)	"We're Not the Same" (2010)

Music video
- "Hands" on YouTube

"Hands" is a song by English duo The Ting Tings. It was written by both Katie White and Jules De Martino and mixed by label-mate Calvin Harris. The single was released to radio airplay on 18 August 2010 after premiering on the Huw Stephens show on BBC Radio 1 at 9:30 pm; a remix was also released for free via digital download on 11 October 2010 on the band's Facebook page. The song was performed at the Wireless Festival, as part of the setlist; they were joined with dancers holding signs, saying work, which when flipped around, would say dance. The song debuted at number 29 on the UK Singles Chart. The line spoken by De Martino at the start of the song, "I don't want to go out. I want to stay in." is a reference to the first lines spoken in the David Bowie song "Modern Love", 'I know when to stay out, I know when to stay in and get things done.'

== History ==
Speculation about the band's second studio album began in October 2009, when details were released to the public about the duo writing their next album in Paris, but then moving to an old German jazz club to record it. The reason being was that the band wanted a new place to test out what sounded good and what did not: "We did the first album by throwing house parties. We'd try them out on our drunk friends and if they danced we'd go ‘Great, let's carry on!’ We're gonna do the same in Berlin – that's why we've got the jazz club – so we can just stick a big plastic bag over the studio so it doesn't get beer on and experiment on some crazy Berliners."

In January 2010, two track titles from the album were revealed, "Help" and "Hands".

In July 2010, news of the duo's upcoming album and single had spread to various blog sites after their personal website put up a notice about how their website was due for refit to match their new single, there was also news on the album which was said to be nearly finished.

The following month, August 2010, the song was officially sent to British radio, and also available for streaming via The Ting Tings' Facebook page.

The official video premiered online on 5 September 2010.

The song appears on the soundtrack for EA Sports game, FIFA 12.

As a result of the initial second studio album being scrapped, the song appears as a bonus track on the deluxe edition of Sounds from Nowheresville (2012).

== Music video ==
The music video for "Hands" first appeared online on 5 September 2010. The video was directed by Warren Fu. Both White and De Martino are in the video, with White playing the keyboard and singing the vocals whilst De Martino is on the drums. The video is intercut with a story about two people who work in a factory and are essentially 'working too hard' until the end where their master, who is a CGI robot, is speared by Katie's microphone. The song then ends with a final clip of both workers climbing out of the factory and looking ahead to a beach on a fantasy planet.

There's another music video for the full acoustic version of the song that can be seen on YouTube and their official Facebook account.

== Track listing ==
iTunes single
No.	Title	Length
1.	"Hands"	3:19

iTunes single
No.	Title	Length
1.	"Hands"	3:19
2.	"Hands" (Retro/Grade Remix)	8:12

iTunes EP
No.	Title	Length
1.	"Hands" (Michael Woods Remix)	7:54
2.	"Hands" (Passion Pit Remix)	3:24
3.	"Hands" (Michael Woods Dub Remix)	7:23
4.	"Hands" (Retro/Grade Dub Remix)	8:28

Other versions
No.	Title	Length
1.	"Hands" (Wideboys Radio Edit)	3:33

== Chart performance ==
"Hands" debuted at number 29 on the UK Singles Chart with sales of 9,873 copies, marking the duo's fifth top forty hit. The single also charted on the Scottish Singles and Albums Chart, where it debuted at number 25.

=== Weekly charts ===
Weekly chart performance for "Hands"
Chart (2010)	Peak position
Australia (ARIA)	57
Belgium (Ultratop 50 Flanders)	26
Belgium (Ultratop 50 Wallonia)	31
Czech Republic Airplay (ČNS IFPI)	18
Denmark (Tracklisten)	40
Scottish Singles Sales (Official Charts)	25
Switzerland (Schweizer Hitparade)	70
UK Singles (Official Charts)	29
US Dance Club Songs (Billboard)	1

=== Year-end charts ===
Year-end chart performance for "Hands"
Chart (2010)	Position
US Dance Club Songs (Billboard)	47

== See also ==
- List of number-one dance singles of 2010 (U.S.)
