= Sounds from Nowheresville =

2012 studio album by the Ting Tings

Studio album by the Ting Tings
- Released: 24 February 2012
- Recorded: 2009–2011; Berlin, London, Murcia and Ibiza
- Genre: Art pop
- Length: 34:00
- Label: Columbia
- Producer: Jules De Martino

The Ting Tings chronology
We Started Nothing (2008)	Sounds from Nowheresville (2012)	Super Critical (2014)

Singles from Sounds from Nowhereville
- 1. "Hands" Released: 27 October 2010; 2. "Hang It Up" Released: 27 December 2011; 3. "Hit Me Down Sonny" Released: 25 May 2012

Sounds from Nowheresville is the second studio album by English indie pop duo the Ting Tings, released on 24 February 2012 by Columbia Records. The album was released almost four years after the band's debut and went through various concepts during its recording.

== Background, recording and release ==
=== Original 'Kunst' concept ===
In December 2008, the duo announced plans to write their second album in Paris and Berlin in 2009. The album was recorded over a period of eight months in the basement of an abandoned jazz club in the Friedrichshain area of Berlin. Jules De Martino stated that they chose Berlin "to have complete, crazy freedom", while Katie White also said that they wanted to "isolate themselves". According to De Martino: "We had to find a new challenge and going to hide away in Berlin was the perfect place because our friends aren't there, our families aren't there and our record company isn't there, so no one really bothered us. I think that if we'd have gone back to Manchester we'd have been a mess." It was reported that the band would collaborate with rapper Jay-Z on the new album. The duo were reportedly assisted by singer and labelmate Rihanna, who contributed vocals to a track.

The album featured a mix of styles, with the band aiming for a "playlist" feel. De Martino explained: "We wanted to make a record that had that much variety that if you played it you could almost shut your eyes and think: 'Is this the same band on each song?' We just had no fear and wanted to make a record that was like an MP3 compilation." De Martino cited Fleetwood Mac, the Pet Shop Boys and TLC as influences on the album. It was described by Clash writer April Welsh as "an album glistening with polished pop perfection. Ranging from acoustic folk to bangin' electro, R'n'B and, of course, rock and roll." The album was self-produced, with White explaining: "We're complete control freaks – I don't think we could work with anyone else. We'd have a heart attack if they changed one little beat."

In January 2010, it was reported that the album would be titled Kunst, which means "art" in German. De Martino explained that the name was taken from a massage parlour near their studio called Massage Kunst: "We took a picture of us standing outside it with Katie's arm up over the S and sent it to the label saying: 'Here's the front sleeve.' It didn't go down too well." The band later announced that Kunst had merely been a working title and that the final name was yet to be decided. They later joked that instead it would be called Cocks.

The sessions eventually produced the single "Hands" which was released in October 2010. Another song, "We're Not the Same" was used in a commercial for Tommy Hilfiger's Loud perfume and was released as a free download.

However, The duo ultimately cancelled the release of their second album in 2010 and erased previously recorded demos because they felt it sounded too similar to everything else on the radio. In an interview with Digital Spy, White said, "We were in Berlin where there is a great electro scene, and so we made songs like that, but quickly realised that everything on the radio was Euro-pop shite. We didn't want our record to be tarnished with that brush." De Martino continued, "We scrapped six of the ten songs, which upset quite a few people. We put out 'Hands', which was meant to be an underground, white label-only release and it ended up being playlisted on Radio 1—we were quite angry so erased over half the album." They also insisted that they "found [their] feet" with their new album, adding, "No-one would give a shit if we'd made a shit Euro-pop song, even if it went top ten."

=== Sounds from Nowheresville concept ===
The band went to Spain and started over with writing and recording the album, this time citing Spice Girls and TLC as inspirations. Four tracks from the abortive Berlin sessions have been revived for the resulting concept.

The resulting album Sounds from Nowheresville was set to be released on 24 February 2012 and was preceded by the lead single "Hang It Up". The previously released songs, "Hands" and "We're Not the Same", were originally reported to appear on the album but were included as bonus tracks on the deluxe edition instead, the latter as a Japanese only bonus track.

A month ahead of the release the album was leaked online.

Sounds from Nowheresville debuted at number 23 on the UK Albums Chart with first-week sales of 6,246 copies.

== Artwork ==
The band launched a contest called Show Us Yours, which gave artists and graphic designers the chance to create art and videos to show the band. One piece of art by artist Milan Abad showed both Katie White and Jules De Martino as skeletons, which caught the band's attention and ultimately became the album's artwork. White stated that other entries would be placed in the album insert.

== Singles and promotion ==
The music video for the album's lead single, "Hang It Up", premiered on YouTube on 18 October 2011. "Hang It Up" was released digitally on 27 December 2011, the first song they had released since "Hands" in October 2010.

A music video for the Bag Raiders remix of "Silence" was directed by Dan Gable and filmed at Salford Lads Club in Manchester in July 2011. The video premiered on 21 November 2011.

The album's second official single, "Hit Me Down Sonny", was added to the BBC Radio 1 C List on 2 May 2012. A four-track EP with remixes for the single was released digitally on 25 May 2012. An accompanying video, consisting of live footage from a show in Paris, debuted on 3 August 2012.

A video for "Soul Killing" was filmed on 29 June 2012. On 13 July 2012, the duo stated on Twitter that they hoped the video would be released the following week, but this never materialised.

The Ting Tings also made videos for other songs from the album. A video for an acoustic rendition of "Day to Day" was uploaded to their YouTube channel on 14 March 2012. On 13 January 2012, the duo reported via Twitter that they were filming a video for "Help" in Manchester. However, the video was never released.

== Critical reception ==
Professional ratings
Aggregate scores
Source	Rating
Metacritic	52/100
Review scores
Source	Rating
AllMusic	2.5/5 stars
The A.V. Club	B−
The Daily Telegraph	4/5 stars
Drowned in Sound	4/10
The Guardian	2/5 stars
The Independent	5/5 stars
NME	5/10
Pitchfork	1.8/10
PopMatters	4/10
Rolling Stone	3.5/5 stars

Sounds from Nowheresville received mixed reviews from music critics. At Metacritic, which assigns a normalised rating out of 100 to reviews from mainstream publications, the album received an average score of 52, based on 30 reviews. Andy Gill of The Independent praised the album as "a masterclass in modern pop creation, pinballing from style to style without endangering their essential 'TingTingness'". The Daily Telegraph's Andrew Perry wrote that the album "sounds anything but laboured", concluding, "Whatever the style, White and de Martino [...] know how to knock a tune together and have delivered a pop party album thrillingly in tune with contemporary listening habits." Rolling Stone's Jody Rosen opined that on Sounds from Nowheresville, "the band again is at its best when White is proclaiming [...] and dissing [...] in a voice pitched somewhere between cheerleader, rapper and Tourette's sufferer." Heather Phares of AllMusic felt that the "scrappy pop of their first album is largely [...] replaced by a glossy eclecticism that, for better or worse, feels labored over." Phares continued, "Sounds from Nowheresville shows that the Ting Tings have more range than their debut suggested, but while it's more ambitious and crafted, it's just not as coherent as We Started Nothing." The A.V. Club's Dan Weiss commented the album is "a blast when it's on and imminently forgettable when it's not".

In a review for NME, Fraser McAlpine dubbed the album a "lukewarm hotchpotch", adding that "[t]he unfortunate irony is that Sounds From Nowheresville doesn't sound much like a grand rejection of pop music at all. It just sounds a little bereft of ideas, and way too short." Stephen Foster of PopMatters characterised the album as "sluggish, self-conscious, and seemingly deliberately bad", while noting that "[t]he best Nowheresville has to offer is 'Hit Me Down Sonny', a band march of a song that offers up goofily incoherent lyrics but possess the energy and verve [...] of the best work from We Started Nothing." Simon Jay Catling of Drowned in Sound expressed that "despite the fact that the production glitters with the high attention-seeking compression of pop music, any explorations haven't gone as far as finding any memorable hooks—and the ones which do stick in the mind do more so for their sheer irritable inanity", citing the songs "Silence", "One by One" and "In Your Life" as "decent moments". The Guardian's Alexis Petridis stated that Sounds from Nowheresville "keeps doing the things bands do when they don't really know what to do: concentrating on riffs instead of melodies, production dynamics instead of songs. The result is an album that sounds simultaneously hefty and vaporous." Jonathan Keefe of Slant Magazine panned the album as "tuneless" and "inert", and found that its songs "aren't noteworthy in terms of content or construction, nor do they resolve into any kind of coherent aesthetic that would give context as to what it is the Ting Tings are really after." Pitchfork's Hari Ashurst felt that "[t]he restless genre-hopping vibe makes this feel less like an album and more like a series of tracks written to briefs [...] The only common thread is how uniformly bad everything is."

== Track listing ==
All tracks are written by Jules De Martino and Katie White.

No.	Title	Length
1.	"Silence"	3:47
2.	"Hit Me Down Sonny"	2:51
3.	"Hang It Up"	3:12
4.	"Give It Back"	3:36
5.	"Guggenheim"	3:57
6.	"Soul Killing"	3:17
7.	"One by One"	3:46
8.	"Day to Day"	3:34
9.	"Help"	3:00
10.	"In Your Life"	3:00
Total length:		34:00

Deluxe edition bonus tracks
No.	Title	Length
11.	"Silence" (Bag Raiders Remix)	4:21
12.	"Hang It Up" (Inertia Remix)	3:58
13.	"Give It Back" (Demo)	4:24
14.	"Hang It Up" (Abacus & Vargas 'Predator' Remix)	3:36
15.	"Hands"	3:20
16.	"Guggenheim" (Andy Taylor 'Got It Right' Remix)	4:14
17.	"Hang It Up" (Shook Remix)	4:38
18.	"Ain't Got Shit"	4:01
19.	"Hang It Up" (CKB Remix)	5:57
Total length:		72:28

Japanese edition bonus tracks
No.	Title	Length
11.	"We're Not The Same"	3:10
12.	"Hands" (Mixed By Calvin Harris)	3:20
13.	"Ain't Got Shit"	4:01
14.	"Give It Back" (Demo)	4:24
15.	"Silence" (Bag Raiders Remix)	4:21
16.	"Guggenheim" (Andy Taylor 'Got It Right' Remix)	4:14
17.	"Hang It Up" (CKB Remix)	5:57
18.	"Hang It Up" (Abacus & Vargas 'Predator' Remix)	3:36
19.	"Hang It Up" (Shook Remix)	4:38
20.	"Hang It Up" (Vanguard Remix)	3:11
Total length:		74:51

- "Hang It Up" contains a drum sample from "The Big Beat," written and performed by Billy Squier.

== Personnel ==
The Ting Tings

- Katie White vocals, guitar, art design
- Jules De Martino – guitar, vocals, production (all tracks); mixing (tracks 4, 5); engineering (tracks 2, 6, 8), art design

Additional musicians

- David Eggar – cello (track 10)
- Snowy (Chris Snow) – extra guitar (track 3), mixing (tracks 3, 4, 10), engineering (tracks 3–5)
- Bag Raiders – keyboards (track 11), remixing, additional production (track 11)
- Shook – keyboards (track 17)

Artwork

- Andy Hayes – art design

Technical

- Jeremy Wheatley – mixing (tracks 1, 2, 6–8)
- Manny Marroquin – mixing (tracks 9, 13)
- Marcos Tovar – engineering (tracks 1, 7, 9, 10, 15)
- Mike Marsh – mastering (tracks 1–11, 13, 15, 17, 18)
- Graeme Durham – mastering (tracks 1–11, 13, 15, 17, 18)
- Nilesh Patel – mastering (tracks 1–11, 13, 15, 17, 18)
- Dave Turner – mastering (tracks 12, 14, 16, 19)
- Inertia – remix (track 12)
- James Abacus – remix (track 14)
- Alex Vargas – remix (track 14)
- Calvin Harris – mixing (track 15)
- Andy Taylor – remix, additional production (track 16)
- CKB – remix (track 19)

== Charts ==
=== Weekly charts ===
Chart (2012)	Peak position
Australian Albums (ARIA)	51
Austrian Albums (Ö3 Austria)	30
Belgian Albums (Ultratop Flanders)	67
Belgian Albums (Ultratop Wallonia)	46
Dutch Albums (Album Top 100)	53
French Albums (SNEP)	59
German Albums (Offizielle Top 100)	50
Irish Albums (IRMA)	44
Japanese Albums (Oricon)	49
Scottish Albums (OCC)	29
Spanish Albums (Promusicae)	100
Swiss Albums (Schweizer Hitparade)	12
UK Albums (OCC)	23
US Billboard 200	87

=== Year-end charts ===
Chart (2012)	Position
Japanese Albums (Oricon)	97

== Release history ==
Release history for Sounds from Nowheresville
Region	Date	Label	Ref.
Australia	24 February 2012	Sony	
Germany	24 February 2012	Sony	
Ireland	24 February 2012	Columbia	
United Kingdom	27 February 2012	Columbia	
Italy	6 March 2012	Sony	
United States	13 March 2012	Columbia	
Japan	28 March 2012	Sony	
