= Great DJ =

2008 single by the Ting Tings

- Re-release picture sleeve

Single by the Ting Tings

from the album We Started Nothing
- Released: 3 March 2008 (re-release)
- Genre: Dance-punk; new wave
- Length: 3:23
- Label: Columbia
- Songwriters: Jules De Martino; Katie White
- Producer: Jules De Martino

The Ting Tings UK singles chronology
"Fruit Machine" (2007)	"Great DJ" (2008)	"That's Not My Name" (2008)

The Ting Tings US singles chronology
"Great DJ" (2008)	"Shut Up and Let Me Go" (2008)

Music video
- "Great DJ" on YouTube

Alternative cover
- Download cover

"Great DJ" is the debut single by English indie pop band The Ting Tings. The song was originally released as a double A-side with "That's Not My Name" by independent record label Switchflicker Records on 28 May 2007.

== Composition ==
Vocalist Katie White states that the song was written by "playing a D chord on the guitar for hours, because that's all I could play. And then I put my finger on the wrong string, and got what I discovered was an augmented chord. And that was the riff!" The single was originally released as a double A-side along with "That's Not My Name".

== Re-release ==
When "Great DJ" was re-released on 3 March 2008, it did not enter the UK Singles Chart until one week after the individual re-release of single "That's Not My Name" went to number one.

The cover sleeves for the single were recycled: Katie White and Jules De Martino gathered old 7-inch records from numerous car boot sales and charity shops in and around Manchester, turned the sleeves inside out and customised them to create new sleeves for this single.

=== iTunes free single ===
"Great DJ" was featured on iTunes' free single of the week in Canada where it received an average of 3½ stars.

== Track listings ==
7-inch vinyl (2007, Switchflicker Records)

1. "That's Not My Name" – 3:43
2. "Great DJ" – 3:23

One-sided 7-inch vinyl (2008, Columbia)

1. "Great DJ" – 3:23

CD 1 (2008, Columbia)

1. "Great DJ" – 3:23
2. "Great DJ" (Calvin Harris remix edit) – 6:37
3. "Great DJ" (7th Heaven radio edit) – 3:31

CD 2 (2008, Columbia)

1. "Great DJ" (Calvin Harris remix) – 7:05
2. "Great DJ" (7th Heaven remix) – 6:38
3. "Great DJ" (7th Heaven dub) – 6:53

Digital EP

1. "Great DJ" (Calvin Harris remix) – 7:05
2. "Great DJ" (7th Heaven remix) – 6:38
3. "Great DJ" (Demo version) – 3:23

== Charts ==
Chart performance for "Great DJ"
Chart (2008)	Peak position
Australia (ARIA)	52
Belgium (Ultratop 50 Flanders)	47
Ireland (IRMA)	35
UK Singles (OCC)	33
US Dance Club Songs (Billboard)	3

== Certifications and sales ==
Region	Certification	Certified units/sales
Japan (RIAJ)	Gold	100,000^{*}
^{*} Sales figures based on certification alone.

== Release history ==
Region	Date	Label(s)	Ref.
United Kingdom	3 March 2008	Columbia	
United States	22 September 2008	Columbia	
