= Fruit Machine (song) =

2007 single by The Ting Tings

- Re-release cover

Single by The Ting Tings

from the album We Started Nothing
- Released: 19 November 2007
- Recorded: 2007
- Genre: Dance-punk; new wave
- Length: 2:55
- Label: Switchflicker
- Songwriters: Jules De Martino; Katie White
- Producer: Jules De Martino

The Ting Tings singles chronology
"That's Not My Name" / "Great DJ" (2007)	"Fruit Machine" (2007)	"Great DJ" (2008)

Audio video
- "Fruit Machine" on YouTube

Alternative covers
- The 100 unique vinyl covers for the Berlin venue

- The 100 unique vinyl covers for the London venue

- The 100 unique vinyl covers for the New York venue

- The 100 unique vinyl covers for the Salford venue

"Fruit Machine" is the second official single released by Salford band The Ting Tings in 2007. The single was limited to a 500-copy run.

The vinyl was only available for fans of The Ting Tings to buy at their live shows. Every single released had different cover art. This is because at every concert, a hundred blank seven-inch sleeves were pinned to a wall, making a canvas on which fans could create an overall piece of artwork that, once dismantled, were used as the sleeves for the singles. The making of the sleeves was also filmed and then shown in real time at each consecutive venue.

The song has a short guitar solo by vocalist and guitarist Katie White. Tremolo picking and distortion are used.

== Critical reception ==
A review of We Started Nothing for MusicOMH criticized the song, comparing its production to the theme for the British sitcom Are You Being Served? and opining that the song was further proof "that it is impossible to write a half decent song with the word 'machine' in the title". Allmusic compared the song's musical style to that of Lily Allen and deemed it a "bit of cheeky bordering on vindictive pop".

== Re-release ==
The song was to receive its full UK release on 9 February 2009, it however was cancelled a week before its released date, being removed from every retailers database. Two weeks later though, their next single would be released, "We Walk". "Fruit Machine" had already charted on the Australian club chart at 37.

== Track listing ==
7" Vinyl

1. "Fruit Machine" - 2:54
2. "Impacilla Carpisung" - 3:43

Regular CD

1. "Fruit Machine" - 2:54
2. "Fruit Machine" - 2:28

Remixes Promo CD

1. "Fruit Machine" (Bimbo Jones Remix) - 6:12
2. "Fruit Machine" (Bimbo Jones Dub) - 6:24
3. "Fruit Machine" (Bimbo Jones Radio Edit) - 3:09
4. "Fruit Machine" (Dave Spoon Vocal Mix) - 5:57
5. "Fruit Machine" (Dave Spoon Dub) - 5:42

== Charts ==
Year	Chart	Peak position
2009	ARIA Australian Club Chart	15
