= We Started Nothing =

2008 studio album by the Ting Tings

Studio album by the Ting Tings
- Released: 16 May 2008
- Recorded: 2007–2008 in Salford
- Genre: Art pop
- Length: 37:47
- Label: Columbia
- Producer: Jules De Martino

The Ting Tings chronology
We Started Nothing (2008)	Sounds from Nowheresville (2012)

Alternative cover
- International cover

Singles from We Started Nothing
- 1. "That's Not My Name" Released: 28 May 2007; 2. "Fruit Machine" Released: 19 November 2007; 3. "Great DJ" Released: 3 March 2008; 4. "Shut Up and Let Me Go" Released: 21 July 2008; 5. "Be the One" Released: 13 October 2008; 6. "We Walk" Released: 23 February 2009

Professional ratings
Aggregate scores
Source	Rating
Metacritic	64/100
Review scores
Source	Rating
AllMusic	3/5 stars
The A.V. Club	B−
Entertainment Weekly	B+
The Guardian	3/5 stars
Mojo	4/5 stars
NME	6/10
Pitchfork	3.8/10
Q	3/5 stars
Rolling Stone	3.5/5 stars
The Times	3/5 stars

We Started Nothing is the debut studio album by English indie pop duo the Ting Tings, released on 16 May 2008 by Columbia Records. The US edition has a different cover image in several background colours. The album was also released in the United Kingdom on red vinyl limited to 2,000 copies. The US vinyl version is a standard black vinyl pressing. As of November 2014, We Started Nothing had sold 639,876 copies in the United Kingdom.

== Background ==
According to vocalist and guitarist of the Ting Tings, Katie White:

The way we write changes with each song. "Keep Your Head" started with Jules [De Martino] on the drums, "We Walk" started with me on piano, "Shut Up and Let Me Go" started with Jules on bass, "That's Not My Name" was me ranting about my frustrations with the record industry. "Great DJ" was me playing a D chord on the guitar for hours, because that's all I could play. And then I put my finger on the wrong string, and got what I discovered was an augmented chord. And that was the riff! The lyrics described the life we were living at the time. It was about getting lost in hedonism, about forgetting that you had bailiffs knocking at your door and just surrendering to the joys of the music in a nightclub for several hours—the boys, the girls, the strings, the drums.

== Singles ==
A double A-side single consisting of "That's Not My Name" and "Great DJ" was released as the first single from the album on 28 May 2007 through the independent label Switchflicker Records. The album's second single, "Fruit Machine", was released as a limited 500-copy run, only available for the fans at the duo's concerts. Four covers were made: one for Salford, one for Berlin, one for London and one for New York. The third single, a reissue of "Great DJ", was released on 3 March 2008. The song didn't chart until the re-release of "That's Not My Name", reaching number 33 on the UK singles chart.

The fourth single released from the album was the re-release of "That's Not My Name". It is so far the duo's most successful on the UK singles chart, reaching the top spot for one week. The single's popularity caused "Great DJ" to finally chart (two months after its release), and also caused "Shut Up and Let Me Go" to chart early (two months before its release). The song became the UK's 22nd best-selling single of 2008, selling 300,000 copies. In the United States, "That's Not My Name" reached number 33 on the Billboard Hot 100.

"Shut Up and Let Me Go" served as the fifth single from the album. Due to the popularity of "That's Not My Name", it entered the top 75 two months before its release, based on downloads. The song was officially released on 21 July 2008. It is the duo's second highest-peaking single in the UK, charting at number six, while reaching number 55 on the Billboard Hot 100.

"Be the One" was released on 13 October 2008 as the sixth single from the album, peaking at number 28 on the UK chart. The re-release of "Fruit Machine" was originally planned to be released on 9 February 2009 as the album's seventh single, but was cancelled a week before the release. "We Walk" was ultimately released as the seventh and final single on 23 February 2009, reaching number 58 in the UK. It was the band's first single not to have a 7-inch vinyl release, instead coming out on CD and 12-inch vinyl only.

== Release ==
The album's original release featured limited red vinyl and CD/DVD editions.

In 2023 the album was re-released as 15th anniversary pink & purple marbled vinyl edition.

== Track listing ==
All tracks are written by Jules De Martino and Katie White.

No.	Title	Length
1.	"Great DJ"	3:23
2.	"That's Not My Name"	5:11
3.	"Fruit Machine"	2:54
4.	"Traffic Light"	2:59
5.	"Shut Up and Let Me Go"	2:52
6.	"Keep Your Head"	3:23
7.	"Be the One"	2:58
8.	"We Walk"	4:04
9.	"Impacilla Carpisung"	3:41
10.	"We Started Nothing"	6:22
Total length:		37:47

Digital edition bonus tracks
No.	Title	Length
11.	"Be the One" (acoustic version)	3:16
12.	"Shut Up and Let Me Go" (acoustic version)	2:46
13.	"Great DJ" (acoustic version)	3:33
14.	"That's Not My Name" (acoustic version)	4:26

Japanese edition bonus tracks
No.	Title	Length
11.	"Great DJ" (acoustic version)	3:33
12.	"Shut Up and Let Me Go" (acoustic version)	2:46
13.	"Great DJ" (7th Heaven Radio Remix)	3:31
14.	"That's Not My Name" (Soul Seekerz Radio Mix)	3:23
15.	"That's Not My Name" (Taku Takahashi Mix)	5:14

Deluxe edition bonus DVD
No.	Title	Length
1.	"Great DJ" (music video)	3:21
2.	"That's Not My Name" (music video)	3:44
3.	"Shut Up and Let Me Go" (music video)	2:55
4.	"Be the One" (music video)	2:53
5.	"Making of Shut Up and Let Me Go"	4:07
6.	"Making of Be the One"	4:30
7.	"Salford/Berlin/London/New York Documentary"	3:01
8.	"Be the One" (acoustic version; audio)	3:14
9.	"Shut Up and Let Me Go" (acoustic version; audio)	2:46
10.	"Great DJ" (acoustic version; audio)	3:34
11.	"That's Not My Name" (acoustic version; audio)	4:26

== Personnel ==
Credits adapted from the liner notes of We Started Nothing.

- Jules De Martino – production
- Dave Sardy – mixing
- Greg Gordon – mix engineering
- Matt Irwin – band photography
- Denis Kleiman – band photography

== Charts ==
=== Weekly charts ===
Chart (2008–2009)	Peak position
Australian Albums (ARIA)	22
Austrian Albums (Ö3 Austria)	57
Belgian Albums (Ultratop Flanders)	38
Belgian Albums (Ultratop Wallonia)	54
Dutch Albums (Album Top 100)	20
European Albums (Billboard)	5
French Albums (SNEP)	21
German Albums (Offizielle Top 100)	59
Irish Albums (IRMA)	3
Japanese Albums (Oricon)	50
New Zealand Albums (RMNZ)	16
Scottish Albums (Official Charts)	2
Swiss Albums (Schweizer Hitparade)	28
UK Albums (Official Charts)	1
US Billboard 200	78
US Independent Albums (Billboard)	8
US Top Alternative Albums (Billboard)	21
US Top Rock Albums (Billboard)	40

=== Year-end charts ===
Chart (2008)	Position
Australian Albums (ARIA)	76
European Albums (Billboard)	58
French Albums (SNEP)	137
Japanese Albums (Oricon)	41
UK Albums (OCC)	23
US Independent Albums (Billboard)	26

Chart (2009)	Position
French Albums (SNEP)	140
UK Albums (OCC)	61

== Certifications ==
Certifications for We Started Nothing
Region	Certification	Certified units/sales
Australia (ARIA)	Gold	35,000^{^}
France (SNEP)	Silver	35,000^{*}
Ireland (IRMA)	Platinum	15,000^{^}
New Zealand (RMNZ)	Gold	7,500^{‡}
United Kingdom (BPI)	2× Platinum	639,876
^{*} Sales figures based on certification alone.^{^} Shipments figures based on certification alone.^{‡} Sales+streaming figures based on certification alone.

== Release history ==
Region	Date	Edition	Label	Ref.
Ireland	16 May 2008	Standard	Columbia	
United Kingdom	19 May 2008	Standard	Columbia	
Australia	23 May 2008	Standard	Sony	
Germany	30 May 2008	Standard	Sony	
United States	3 June 2008	Standard	Columbia; RED Ink	
France	16 June 2008	Standard	Sony	
United Kingdom	24 November 2008	Deluxe	Columbia	
Japan	21 January 2009	Standard; deluxe	Sony	
France	8 June 2009	Deluxe	Sony	
