= The Ting Tings =

English musical duo

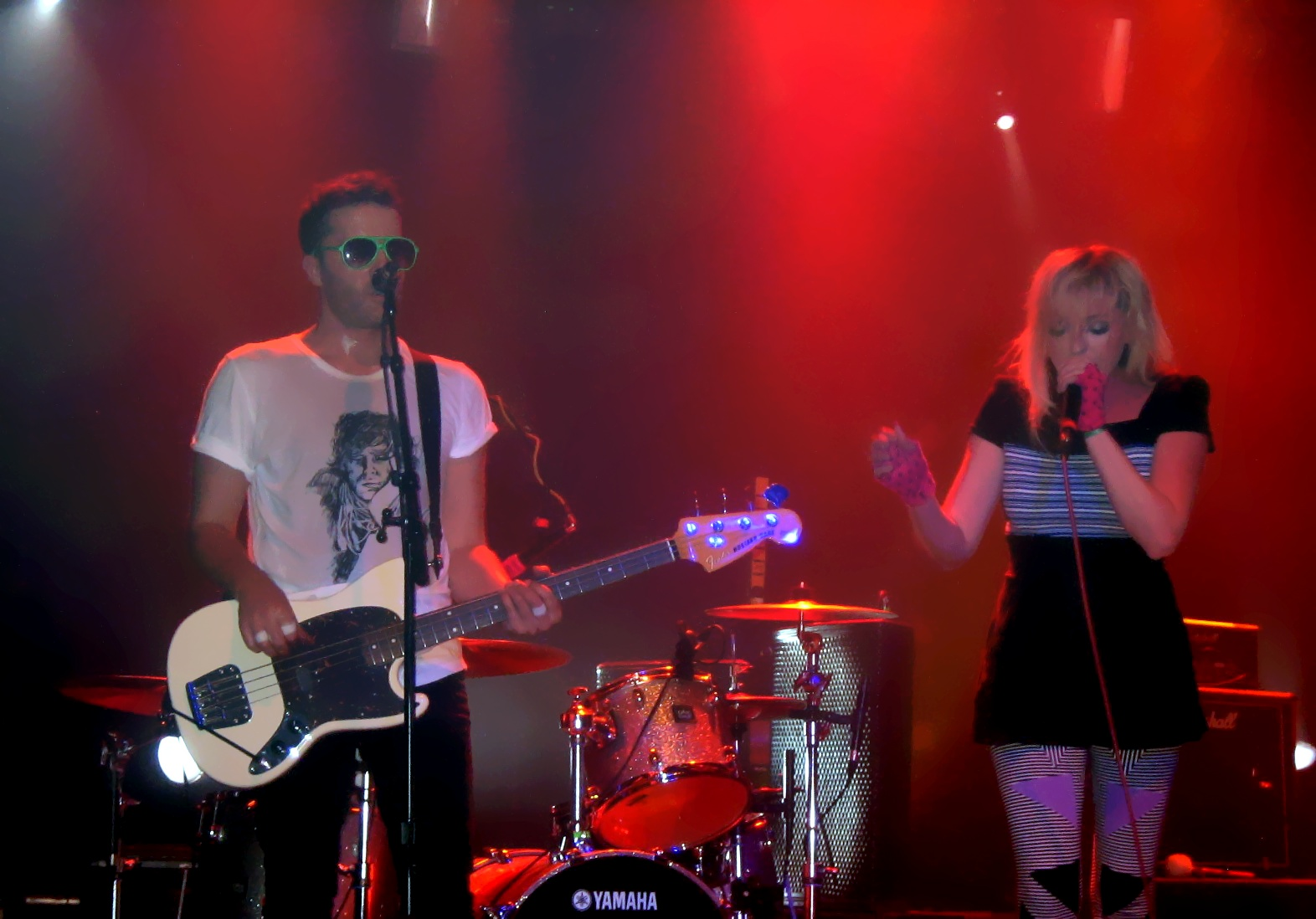
- The Ting Tings performing in 2009

Background information
- Origin: Salford, Greater Manchester, England
- Genres: Indie pop; indie rock; dance-punk; synth-pop; dance-pop
- Years active: 2007–present
- Labels: Columbia; RED Ink; Roc Nation; Finca; Wonderful
- Members: Katie White; Jules De Martino
- Website: thetingtings.com

The Ting Tings are an English indie pop duo formed in Salford, Greater Manchester, in 2007. The band consists of Katie White (vocals, guitar, bass drums, bass guitar, cowbells) and Jules De Martino (drums, lead guitar, bass guitar, keyboards, vocals). The duo's debut studio album, We Started Nothing, was released in 2008 by Columbia Records to positive reviews and commercial success, peaking at number one on the UK Albums Chart and number 78 on the US Billboard 200. It spawned four singles, including "That's Not My Name", which topped the UK Singles Chart in May 2008 and reached number 39 on the US Billboard Hot 100, and “Shut Up and Let Me Go”, which earned them a MTV Video Music Award. They received two Brit Award nominations, including for British Album of the Year and a nomination for the Grammy Award for Best New Artist in 2010. Their second studio album, Sounds from Nowheresville, was released in February 2012, with the lead single "Hang It Up" released on 16 January 2012. Their third studio album, Super Critical, was released in October 2014. Their fourth studio album, The Black Light, was released in October 2018. Their fifth studio album, Home, was released on 6 June 2025.

== Career ==
=== Background and formation ===
Katie White started her music career as a school-time hobby in a punk trio called TKO—short for Technical Knock Out—with two friends from Lowton School, Marion Grethe Seaman and Emma Lally. The band had minimal success, once sharing the same stage as the bands Steps and Atomic Kitten. While De Martino was in Manchester, the pair bumped into each other and discovered they had a mutual love of Portishead. De Martino and White both moved into the creative space Islington Mill Studios (the Mill) in the Salford, Greater Manchester area. The pair, along with friend Simon Templeman, went on to form the Portishead-influenced trio Dear Eskiimo, who signed to Mercury Records. However, due to a change of directors and managers, the management style of the record label caused them to split. The experience left White and De Martino with a distrust of the music industry. The duo fell in love with living at the Mill, surrounded by artists and musicians. The pair developed their sound from influences of performers at the Mill, and were inspired to form their own group, "The Ting Tings". Ting Ting was the name of a Chinese colleague of White at a shop, who told her that it sounded like the pronunciation of "bandstand" in Mandarin (亭). The band researched the name and found it also meant the "sound of innovation on an open mind". Having created three songs, the band's first gig was a free-beer invite all at the Mill in their rented dwelling called "the Engine House". Subsequent gigs were funded on donations, and after their third gig they were name-checked on XFM. The Islington Mill gigs ended up as some of the most sought-after tickets on the Manchester party scene with various A&R reps and record producers, such as Rick Rubin, asking for tickets.

=== Exposure ===
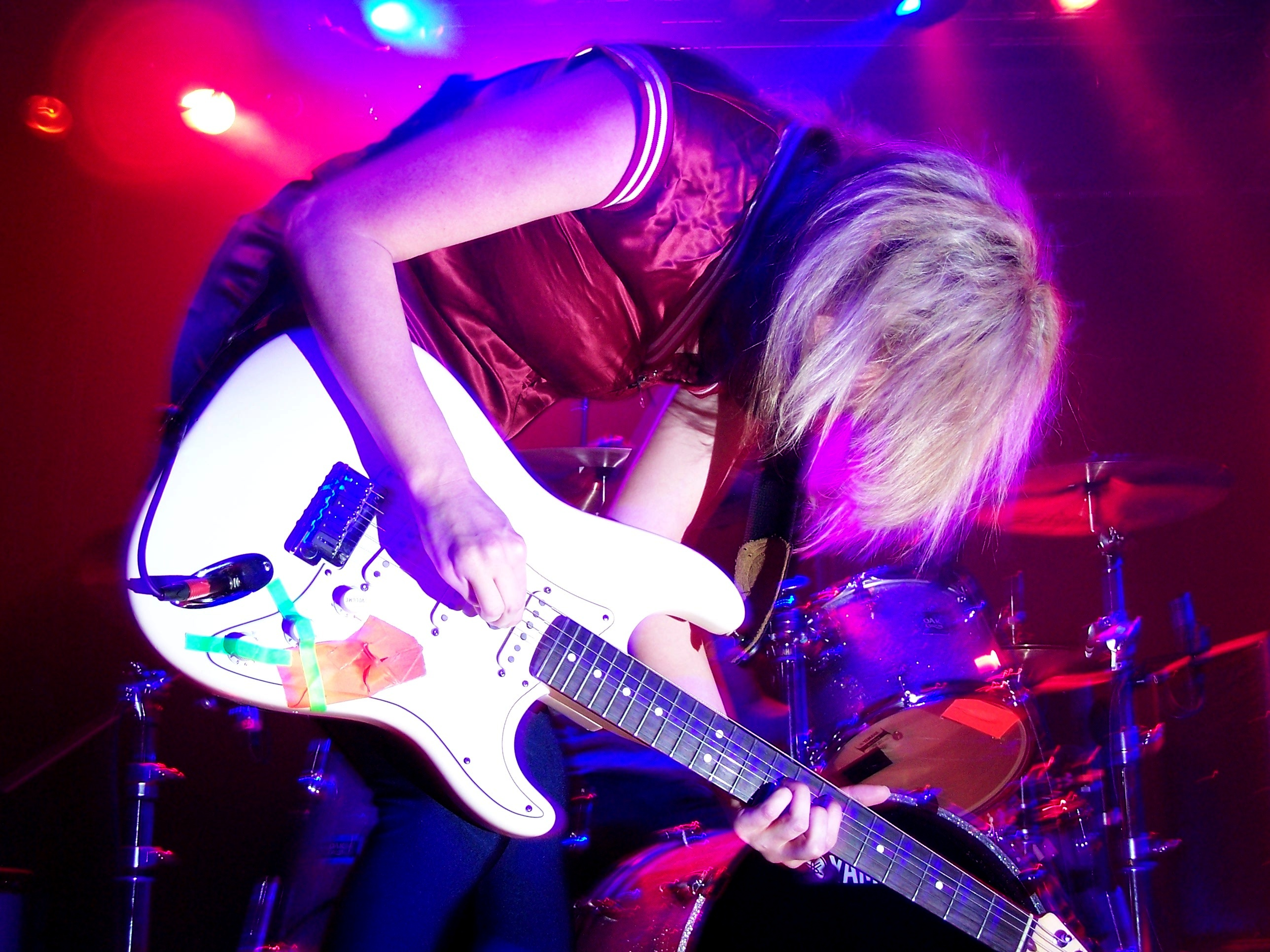
Performing at the Variety Playhouse in Atlanta, Georgia on 23 October 2008

Their first double-A single "That's Not My Name/Great DJ" was jointly released by the band and a local label, Switchflicker Records. With their second single "Fruit Machine", they were on heavy rotation on British radio, including BBC 6 Music and others. DJ Marc Riley was the first to have them in session on 6 Music and the first to play their record on the station. "Fruit Machine" was released as a limited-edition, 500-only, seven-inch single on Legendre Starkie Records (the band's own label), which was only offered at their three live shows. They had a notable performance at the Glastonbury Festival in 2007, and after an October 2007 tour of universities in the UK with Reverend and the Makers, they signed to Columbia Records. On 14 December 2007, they appeared on Later... with Jools Holland. In May 2008, the band credited BBC Introducing for giving them their 'life changing' break after the show spotted the band and put them forward for inclusion in the Glastonbury running order. In January 2008, they were voted third in the annual BBC 6 Music poll of industry experts Sound of 2008, for acts to emerge in the coming year. In February 2008, they were the opening slot act on the 2008 Shockwaves NME Awards Tour, performing with The Cribs, Joe Lean And The Jing Jang Jong, and Does It Offend You, Yeah?. In conjunction with NME and HMV, the band contributed a demo version of "Great DJ" to a limited-audience, 5,000-copies-only, 10" vinyl release of all the artists on the NME Awards Tour. In late March 2008, The Ting Tings joined with Alphabeat and The Fratellis to play as part of the MTV Spanking New Music Tour, at a gig held at the Islington Academy in London.

=== 2008–2009: We Started Nothing ===
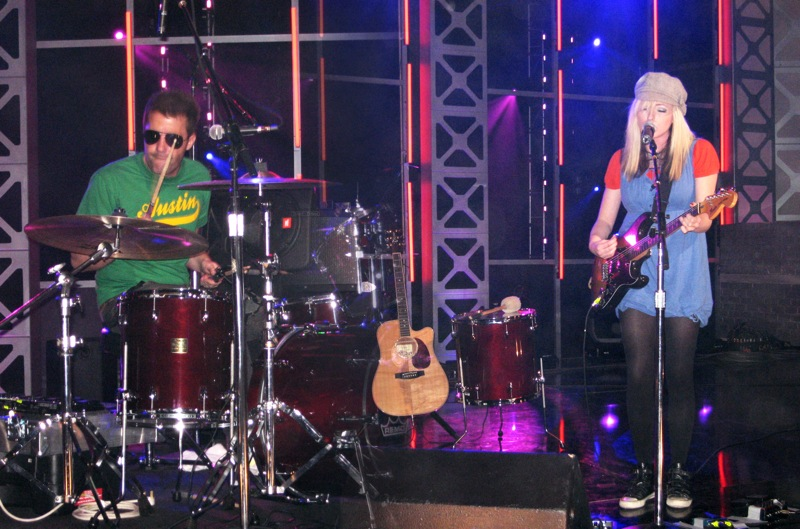
Performing at South by Southwest in 2008

The first single released on Columbia was "Great DJ", which received considerable airplay on BBC Radio 1 and XFM in the UK and praise from magazines such as NME. "Great DJ" reached top 40 on the UK Singles Chart. The band's debut album, We Started Nothing, was released in May 2008 and entered the UK Albums Chart at number one, following the single "That's Not My Name", which topped the singles chart. Subsequent singles were "Shut Up and Let Me Go", which peaked at number six, "Be the One" (number 28) and "We Walk" (number 58). We Started Nothing won an Ivor Novello Award for best album in May 2009. The Ting Tings recorded a cover version of Altered Images' "Happy Birthday" for the children's show Yo Gabba Gabba. In May 2008, the band performed a live set on the in New Music We Trust stage at Radio 1's Big Weekend in Maidstone, Kent, which was made available by the BBC's online video player application iPlayer. The Ting Tings performed at the iTunes Live London Festival in the KOKO nightclub in July 2008; the performance was released as a downloadable EP in the iTunes Store under the title iTunes Live: London Festival '08. In December 2008, they (along with numerous other singers and bands) performed on Jools Holland's Hootenanny show on BBC2. The band toured Australia and New Zealand in early 2009 as part of the Big Day Out Festival. They also toured in Singapore as part of that festival's night counterpart, Big Night Out. In June 2009, they returned to the Glastonbury Festival, playing the Other stage on Friday night, and appeared at the Isle of Wight Festival.

In the United States, the single "Shut Up and Let Me Go" appeared in an Apple iPod commercial in late April 2008, helping the song peak at number 55 on the Billboard Hot 100. Tracks from the album were featured in various television shows, films and advertisements. The Ting Tings were one of four performers who played small interludes consisting of remixes of past hits throughout the 2008 MTV Video Music Awards, including a section from "Shut Up and Let Me Go" with Blink-182 drummer Travis Barker and DJ AM. They also won the award for Best UK Video for their single "Shut Up and Let Me Go". Columbia Records announced the U.S. release of the single "That's Not My Name" for January 2009, followed by a March/April U.S. concert tour. The duo also toured the country as a support act for Pink on her Funhouse Tour. In December 2009, the duo was nominated for Best New Artist at the 52nd Grammy Awards. The Ting Tings appeared as the musical guests on Saturday Night Live on the 16 January 2010 episode, hosted by Sigourney Weaver.

=== 2010–2012: Sounds from Nowheresville ===
The duo began writing their second album in Paris, France. The original incarnation of the album was recorded over a period of eight months in the basement of a former jazz club in the Friedrichshain area of Berlin, Germany. It was described by Clash writer April Welsh in 2010 as "an album glistening with polished pop perfection. Ranging from acoustic folk to bangin' electro, R‘n’B and, of course, rock and roll." The lead single, "Hands" (the first track they wrote for the album), was released in October 2010. It was mixed by Calvin Harris and written by the duo themselves. The single debuted at number 29 on the UK Singles Chart, marking the duo's fifth top 40 single; it also topped the Billboard dance chart in the US.

The Ting Tings later scrapped the majority of the material from the Berlin sessions against the wishes of their label, with White explaining: "We were in Berlin where there is a great electro scene with Sian Hogan, and so we made songs like that, but quickly realised that everything on the radio was Euro-pop shite. We didn't want our record to be tarnished with that brush". De Martino added that they were angry the single "Hands" was promoted on BBC Radio 1, but had been intended by the band as "an underground, white label-only release". The band relocated to Spain, where they found influence in the music of the Beastie Boys, Spice Girls and TLC. They performed new material from the album in July 2011 at DCode Festival in Madrid.

The video for the single "Hang It Up" premiered on YouTube in October 2011, followed by a video for the song "Silence" (remixed by Australian electro-house duo Bag Raiders) in November 2011. Another track, "Soul Killing", premiered on the internet in early February 2012; a video was filmed but never released. The album, Sounds from Nowheresville, was released in the same month and reached number 24 on the UK Albums Chart.

=== 2012–2015: Super Critical ===
The band went to Ibiza in September 2012 to begin writing and recording material for their third studio album, which they worked on through in April 2013. They travelled to New York City to mix and master the album in September 2013. In October 2013, the band stated they had nearly finished mixing their third album and were planning to record numerous music videos. They released a club remix of the first single, "Wrong Club" through SoundCloud in April 2014; the single was released to download in July.

The duo's third studio album, Super Critical, was released in October 2014.

The band's 2015 US tour was cancelled in June 2015 as a result of a hand injury suffered by White.

=== 2016–2019: The Black Light ===
After the tour in support of Super Critical The Ting Tings kept a low profile for the most part. The band made several festival appearances, including performances in Philippines and Colombia for the first time in 2017. During 2018, The Ting Tings started being more active on social media, eventually announcing their new album The Black Light via their Instagram story. The album was released on 26 October 2018.

An alternative version of The Black Light subtitled The Manchester Versions was released in 2019.

=== 2023–present: Home ===
In November 2023 The Ting Tings started teasing new music through their social media, sharing snippets of the new song "Dreaming" and announcing new album for 2024. Another new song, "Danced on the Wire", was teased in March 2024.

On 24 May the band released "Down" as the first official preview from their new album, potentially titled Meadow, inspired by soft-rock acts like Fleetwood Mac, Toto, Steely Dan and Christopher Cross. The band teased a country album back in 2012. Both "Down" and "Danced in the Wire" were released as a limited edition 7" vinyl with release in early October.

That November, following the digital release of the songs, press reported of a first announcement of their fifth album, to be titled Home, and an initial release date on 28 February 2025. Instead, that day saw the release of the lead single "Good People Do Bad Things", with the release date of Home announced as 6 June.

== Members ==
=== Katie White ===
Katherine Rebecca "Katie" White (born 1983 in Lowton, England) was brought up on a farm in Lowton, and attended Lowton School, which has a large performing arts department. In 1995, White's grandfather Ken (of whom Katie saw little) won £6.6 million from the then-newly established National Lottery and gave each of his three sons £1 million. Katie's father David used his share of the money to purchase a haulage company, and he helped Katie during her school years as a prospective musician.

=== Jules De Martino ===
Julian "Jules" De Martino (born 1969 in London) began playing drums at age 13. He studied fine art at Loughton College in Essex and signed a minor publishing deal with Morrison Leahy Music (who also publish George Michael). He formed a band, Mojo Pin, which was influenced by artist Jeff Buckley. The band released two indie singles: "You" and "My Imagination", with Pondlife Records and toured with Irish band the Big Geraniums in 1997.

== Discography ==
- We Started Nothing (2008)
- Sounds from Nowheresville (2012)
- Super Critical (2014)
- The Black Light (2018)
- Home (2025)
