= Jules De Martino =

English musician (born 1969)

Julian De Martino
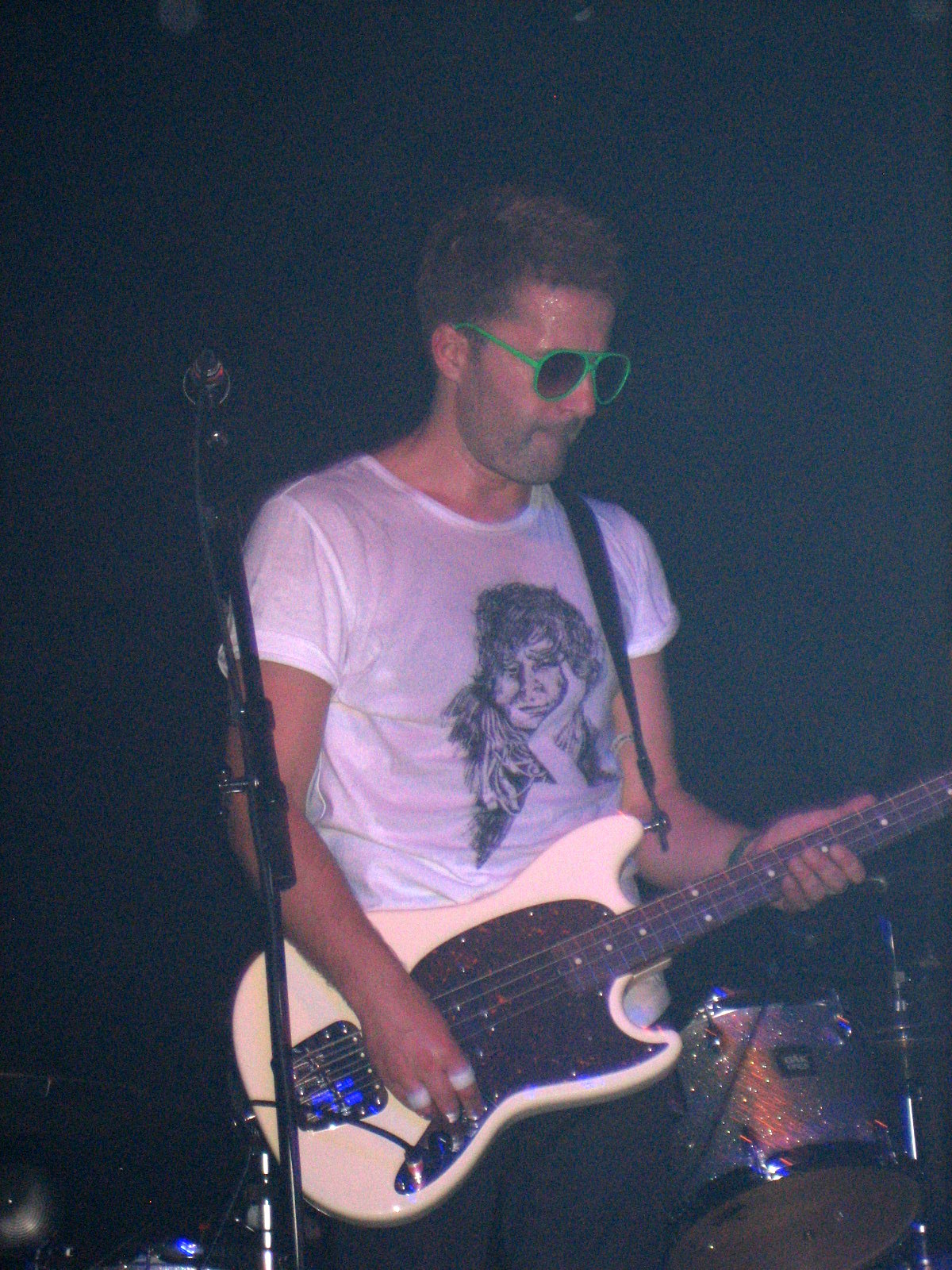
- De Martino in 2009

Background information
- Born: Julian De Martino; 16 July 1969 (age 57); West Ham, London, England
- Occupations: Singer; songwriter; musician
- Instruments: Guitar; vocals; bass; keyboards; drums
- Years active: 1987–present
- Member of: The Ting Tings
- Partner: Katie White

Julian "Jules" De Martino (born 16 July 1969) is an English musician and a member of the indie pop duo the Ting Tings.

== Early life ==
De Martino was born in West Ham, the son of Northern Irish mother, Rosemary (née Middleton), and Italian father, Benito De Martino. Jules has one older sister, Maria. He began playing drums at the age of 13.

== Musical projects ==
=== Babakoto ===
When he was 17, De Martino was the drummer and songwriter in a band called Babakoto (the babakoto is a rare lemur from Madagascar), who once played as a backing group for Bros and released a single at the end of 1987 called "Just to Get By", which failed to chart.

=== Mojo Pin ===
After Babakoto broke up, De Martino became the lead singer in another indie band called Mojo Pin, named after the first song on Jeff Buckley's 1994 album Grace. Mojo Pin released two singles, "You" in 1995 and "My Imagination" in 1996.

=== TKO ===
In March 2001 Katie White's father David White brought in De Martino as a songwriter and he wrote four songs for her group TKO (Technical Knock Out).

=== Dear Eskiimo ===
De Martino moved to Manchester and formed a band with Katie White and DJ Simon Templeman, which they called Dear Eskiimo (often misreported as Dead Eskimo). In explaining the choice of the name, De Martino noted the genre-crossing nature of their music, and that the name was intended "to be as nomadic, tribal and independent as possible" (as he states in the band's biography at their public relations website); he goes on to note that "there were already several bands called Eskimo", and that "some of our songs told such good stories that it felt... we were writing... a letter. As a beginning, 'Dear Eskiimo' just fitted." (About the doubling of the "i" in the spelling, De Martino only states, "It's two 'I's... [l]ike on your face.")

The first performance of Dear Eskiimo was as a support act between two rock bands. Reporting in April 2010 states that they were signed by Mercury Records, "[j]ust over two years" earlier. "[C]reative differences" and the "heavy handling" of the record label led to the split.

== The Ting Tings ==
In 2007, De Martino and White started a duo with White on vocals, guitar and bass drum and De Martino on vocals, drums, bass, guitar, and keyboards. They started writing songs together and performing short concerts. White was working in a boutique with a Chinese girl called Ting Ting, which sounds like Mandarin Chinese for band stand (亭), and White used it as the name for the band. One transliteration of the band's name in Japanese is a slang word for penis (wikt:ちんちん). The Ting Tings started by playing for private parties at the Islington Mill arts centre in Salford and their debut album, We Started Nothing, was released on 19 May 2008.

== Personal life ==
In a February 2022 BBC interview, De Martino and White spoke of their 20-month-old daughter and personal relationship. "The pair have previously avoided saying whether they are romantic as well as musical partners. 'We never particularly spoke about it,' the singer says. 'We always wanted to keep it quite separate from the music, but it's quite hard when you have literally a mini person. We've been together a long time now.'"
