= Katie White (musician) =

English musician

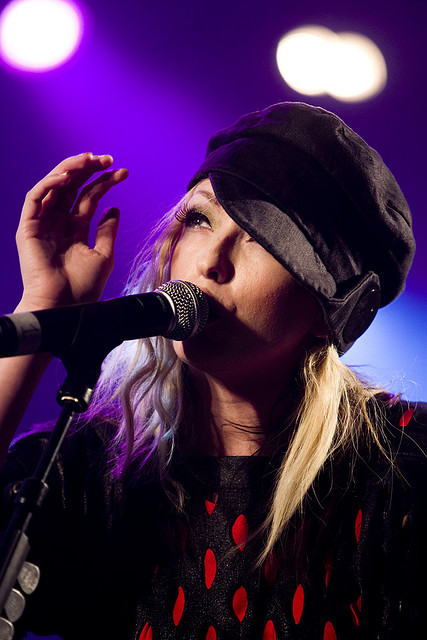
- White performing during 2009

Background information
- Born: Katie Rebecca White; Lowton, Greater Manchester, England
- Genres: Dance-punk; dance-pop; new rave; pop
- Occupations: Musician; singer; songwriter; rapper
- Instruments: Vocals; guitar; bass; percussion; keyboards
- Years active: 1998–present
- Labels: Columbia; Red Ink
- Member of: The Ting Tings
- Partner: Jules De Martino

Katie Rebecca White is an English musician and member of the indie pop duo the Ting Tings. After some success with a girl group punk trio TKO, which supported Steps and Atomic Kitten, she then met Jules De Martino, and together they formed the band Dear Eskiimo. The band went on to sign a small record deal with Mercury Records. Whilst living in the creative space Islington Mill in Salford, Dear Eskiimo disbanded. Katie White and De Martino subsequently formed the Ting Tings in 2007. The duo developed both a musical and romantic partnership and began performing at parties in the mill.

== Early life ==
White was raised on a farm in Lowton with her father David K. White, mother Lynne C. (Sharples) and sister Helena. White went to Lowton High School in Lowton, which has a large performing arts department.

== Career ==
=== TKO ===
White started her music career in a girl group punk trio TKO, short for technical knock out, with two friends from Lowton school, Joanne Leeson and Emma Lally. They had some success and supported Steps and Atomic Kitten. TKO also appeared on ITV's CD:UK.

=== Dear Eskiimo ===
White got back in touch with Jules De Martino when she was at Leeds University and he moved to Manchester. They formed a band called Dear Eskiimo (often misreported as Dead Eskimo) with a DJ friend Simon Templeman. The name was intended to be as nomadic, tribal and independent as possible. Their first performance was as a support between two rock bands but it went well and they were signed up by Mercury Records at the end of 2004. Creative differences and the management style of the record label caused them to split up.

=== The Ting Tings ===
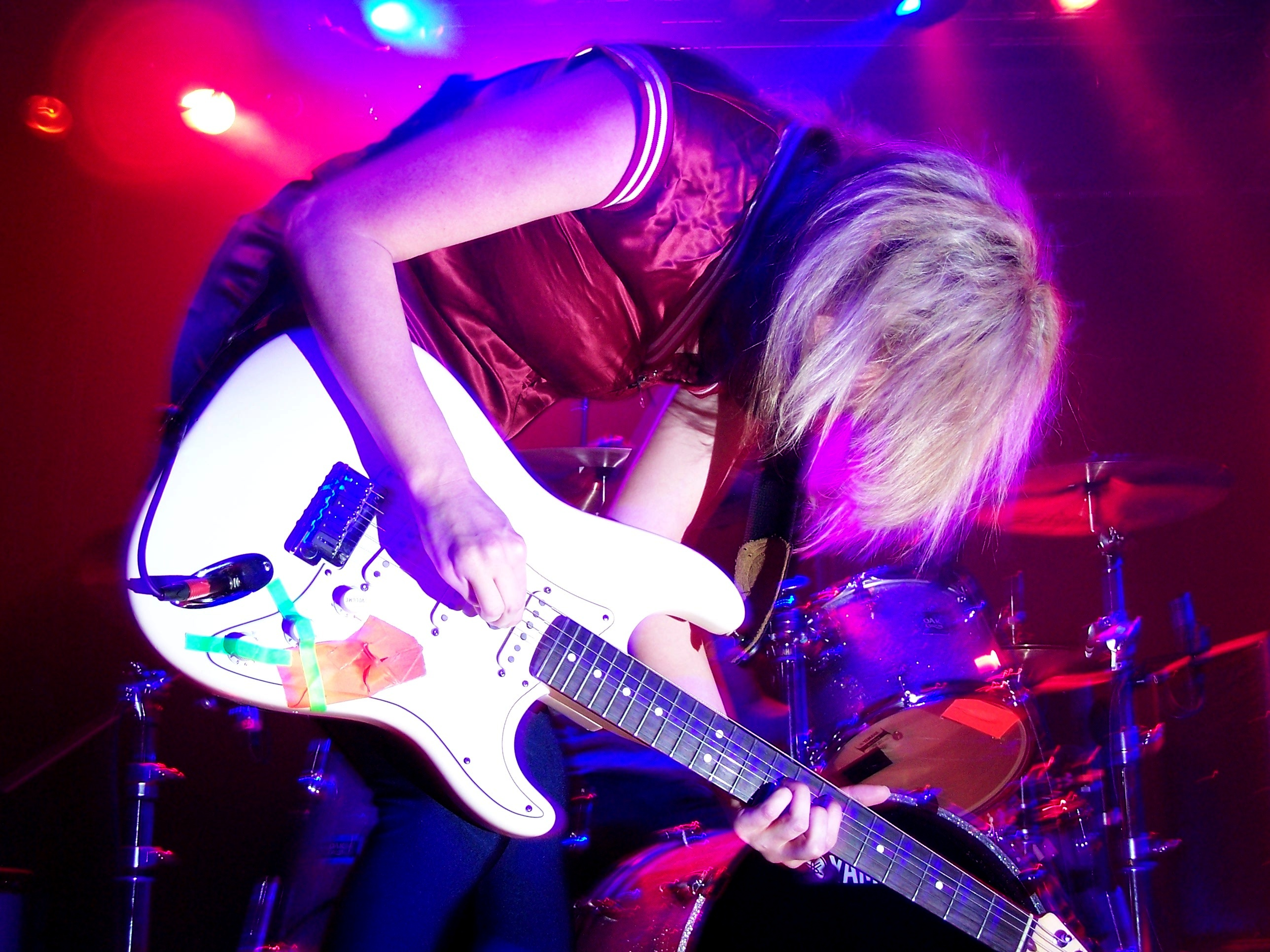
White playing the guitar at Variety Playhouse in Atlanta, Georgia on 23 October 2008

White and De Martino started a band in 2007 with White on vocals, guitar, piano and bass drum and De Martino on vocals, drums, bass, guitar and keyboards. They started writing songs together and doing short concerts. White was working in a boutique with a Chinese girl named "Ting Ting", which sounds like Mandarin Chinese for "band stand" (亭) or "listening" (聽) and White used it as the name for the band. The Ting Tings started by playing for private parties at the Islington Mill arts centre in Salford, and their debut album We Started Nothing was released on 19 May 2008. Their follow-up album Sounds from Nowheresville was released on 27 February 2012 in the UK and 15 March in the United States. In 2014, White told the Daily Record that comments by Internet trolls previously caused her to stop writing songs for six months. In 2015, she sustained a tendon injury to her left hand that caused the band to cancel its U.S. tour.

== Discography ==
The Ting Tings released their debut album, We Started Nothing, on 19 May 2008. Their follow-up album Sounds from Nowheresville was released on 27 February 2012 in the UK and 15 March in the United States. Super Critical, their third album, was released on 27 October 2014.

== Personal life ==
In a February 2022 BBC interview, White and De Martino spoke of their 20-month-old daughter and personal relationship: "The pair have previously avoided saying whether they are romantic as well as musical partners. 'We never particularly spoke about it,' the singer says. 'We always wanted to keep it quite separate from the music, but it's quite hard when you have literally a mini person. We've been together a long time now.'"
