= Leon Jackson discography =

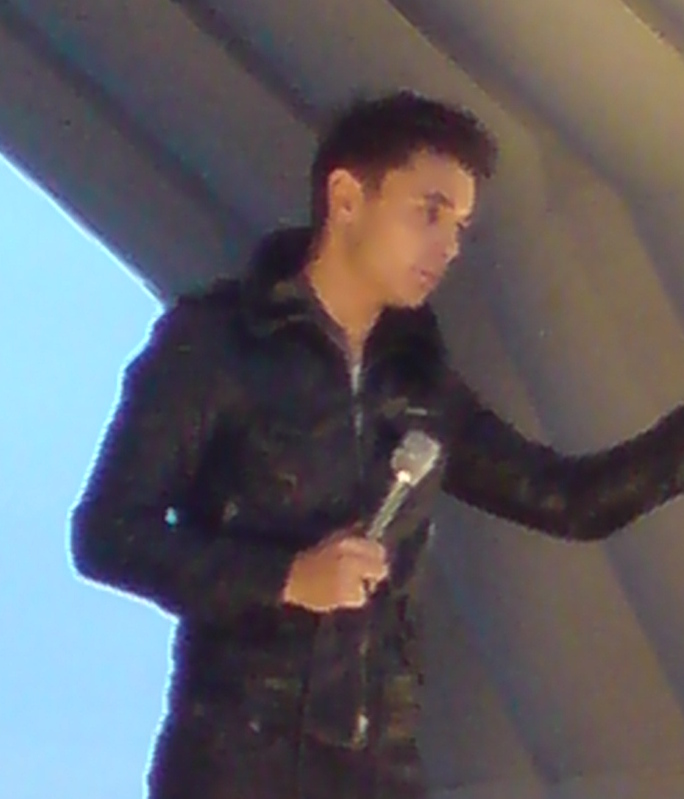
- Jackson performing live during his 2009 Right Now Tour of the UK and Ireland
- Studio albums: 1
- Singles: 4
- Music videos: 3

Scottish singer and songwriter, Leon Jackson, has released one studio album and four singles since 2007. His debut single, "When You Believe" was released in December 2007, and sold 490,000 copies in the United Kingdom, later becoming certified Gold by the British Phonographic Industry (BPI). His second single, "Don't Call This Love" was released a week prior to the release of his debut album, and debuted at number one on the Scottish Singles Charts, number three on the UK Singles Charts and number eight on the Irish Singles Charts. It also reached number ten on the European Hot 100 Singles.

His debut album, Right Now, was released in October 2008 and debuted at number two in his native Scotland, number four in the United Kingdom and number seven in the Republic of Ireland. On the World Albums Top 100 compiled by Billboard, it reached number twenty-five. The album was later certified Gold by the British Phonographic Industry (BPI) for sales in excess of 150,000 copies, whilst in the Republic of Ireland it was certified Platinum by the Irish Recorded Music Association (IRMA). In November 2008, he released "Creative" as the third single from Right Now, performing the single live on BBC Children in Need (2008) as an "exclusive". The song went on to debut at number 94 on the UK Singles Chart.

The fourth and final single released from the album, "Stargazing", was released in February 2009. In March 2009, Jackson departed ways with his record label, Sony BMG. In 2012, Jackson collaborated as a songwriter alongside Vince Kidd on the song "Sick Love", which reached No. 34 on the UK Hip Hop and R&B Singles Chart. Jackson began songwriting for a second album in 2016, and in 2024, indicated that the album was nearing competition, however, as of 2026, no release details have been confirmed.

== Studio albums ==
List of albums, with selected chart positions and certifications
Title	Album details	Peak chart positions					Sales	Certifications
Title	Album details	SCO	UK	UK Down	UK Phys	IRE	Sales	Certifications
Right Now	Released: 20 October 2008; Label: Syco, Sony Music; Formats: CD, digital download	2	4	5	4	7	UK: 136,117	BPI: Gold; IRMA: Platinum

== Singles ==
Year	Title	Peak chart positions						Certifications	Album
Year	Title	SCO	IRE	UK	UK Down	UK Phys	EUR	Certifications	Album
2007	"When You Believe"	1	1	1	1	1	4	BPI: Gold	Right Now
2008	"Don't Call This Love"	1	8	3	4	2	10		Right Now
2008	"Creative"	—	—	94	88	—	—		Right Now
2009	"Stargazing"	—	—	—	—	—	—		Right Now
"—" denotes a single that did not chart or was not released.

== Music videos ==
Year	Title
2007	"When You Believe"
2008	"Don't Call This Love"
2008	"Creative"

== Other songs ==
=== As songwriter ===
- Vince Kidd - "Sick Love" (2012)
