= Right Now (Leon Jackson album) =

Studio album by Leon Jackson
- Released: 17 October 2008 (IRE); 20 October 2008 (UK)
- Recorded: 2007–2008
- Genre: Pop, jazz, soul
- Length: 47:54
- Label: Syco, Sony BMG
- Producer: Steve Mac

Singles from Right Now
- 1. "When You Believe" Released: 19 December 2007; 2. "Don't Call This Love" Released: 11 October 2008; 3. "Creative" Released: November 2008; 4. "Stargazing" Released: 19 January 2009

Right Now is the debut studio album by Scottish singer Leon Jackson, released via Syco Music and Sony BMG, with Steve Mac serving as the albums sole producer. The album was preceded by Jackson's debut single, "When You Believe", which was released in December 2007. The album received its first official release in the Republic of Ireland on 17 October 2008, followed by the United Kingdom on 20 October 2008. Jackson described the album as "a mixture in styles of modern jazz with singer-songwriter elements, and a lot of it is really soulful."

The album received mixed reviews, although the official lead single, "Don't Call This Love", which was released in October 2008, debuted atop the Scottish Singles Charts and at number three on the UK Singles Chart. It remained at number one in Scotland for two weeks. A commercial success, the album debuted within the top five in both the United Kingdom and Scotland, spending ten weeks within the UK Top 100 Album Charts, and twelve weeks within the Scottish 100 Album Charts. By March 2009, the album had sold an estimated 135,892 copies in the United Kingdom, becoming Gold certified by the British Phonographic Industry (BPI).

As of December 2025, Right Now has estimated to have sold 150,000 copies in the United Kingdom, and has been certified Platinum by the Irish Recorded Music Association (IRMA) in the Republic of Ireland, indicating sales in the region of 15,000 copies.

== Background and release ==
Right Now was released 21 October 2008. It debuted at number 7 on the Ireland Top 75 in the week of 23 October 2008, remaining on that chart for a total of five weeks. It debuted at No. 4 on the UK Top 40 Albums chart for the week of 26 October 2008. During the following week, it was at No. 20, and the week after that No. 37. During the following week, it slipped out of the Top 40 but remained in the UK Top 75 chart for six additional weeks. The next two singles, "Creative" and "Stargazing", were released as download-only. "Creative", which was released in November 2008, peaked at No. 94 on the charts for the week of 29 November 2008. "Stargazing" was released in January 2009 but failed to make an impact on the charts. The album sold 135,892 copies. On 19 March 2009 it was confirmed that Leon Jackson was dropped by his label, Syco/Sony, after poor sales of his album and the lack of success of his most recent singles.

"The album is a mixture in styles of modern jazz with singer-songwriter elements, and a lot of it is really soulful"
– Leon Jackson speaking about Right Now

— Dingwall, John

The first single, "Don't Call This Love", was released on 12 October 2008. Jackson made a guest appearance on the fifth series of The X Factor the night before, to perform the single. "Don't Call This Love" peaked at No. 3 in the United Kingdom and No. 8 in Ireland. The album was recorded from 2007 to 2008 under the direction of Simon Cowell, head of the Syco/Sony BMG record label, and under the production of producer Steve Mac. In an episode of the Bebo series from Jackson Leon's Life, one episode shows Jackson recording the track "All in Good Time" and how the original high note towards the end of the song was changed to a lower key note because Jackson could not reach the high note well enough on the original version of the song. The album was completed in 2008 and released on 20 October 2008. The single was available to download from midnight after the result of the show on 15 December 2007, and a CD was released on 19 December 2007.

An unusual decision, as most new singles are released on a Monday to gain maximum sales for the UK Singles Chart the following Sunday, however, there were exemptions such as the previous two X Factor winners whose singles released in this fashion, in order for them to compete to be the Christmas number-one single, which they all became. A video for the single was made by each of the final four of the series, Jackson, Rhydian Roberts, Same Difference, and Niki Evans. However, only the winner's version of the song and video was released. The song was the fourth biggest-selling single in the UK in 2007 and remained number one in 2008. However, this version of the song remained in the top 40 for seven weeks, despite being at the top of the chart for three weeks. It soon disappeared from the top 100 and was gone by late February.

== Promotion ==
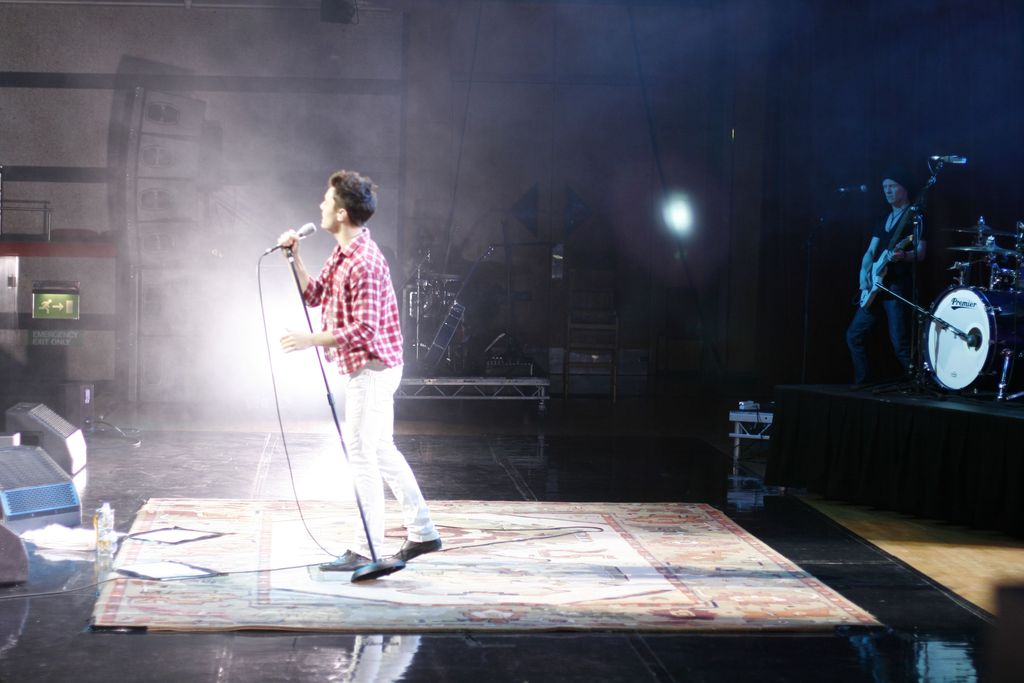
Jackson performing live in Birmingham during the Right Now UK & Ireland tour, 2009

"When You Believe" was released as Jackson's winner's single in December 2007, and served as the lead single from the album. It debuted atop the singles charts in the United Kingdom where it remained for 3 weeks, as well as reaching the top of the singles charts in Ireland and his native Scotland. The single sold 490,000 copies. The single was available to download from midnight after the result of the show on 15 December 2007, and a CD was rush-released mid-week, on 19 December 2007. This was unusual, as most new singles are released on a Monday to gain maximum sales for the UK Singles Chart the following Sunday. Exceptions included the previous two X Factor winners whose singles were released in this fashion, in order for them to compete to be the Christmas number-one single, which they all became. The song ended 2007 as the year's third biggest-selling single in the UK.

To promote the release, Jackson performed the song on various UK television shows including GMTV, This Morning and The X Factor. After one year recording the album, Jackson debuted his new material, with his first performance on The X Factor, in which he sang "Don't Call This Love", and later performed the song on GMTV along with another track from the album, "You Don't Know Me". "Don't Call This Love" was released in October 2008 as the second single from Right Now. In the United Kingdom, "Don't Call this Love" debuted inside the top five on the UK Singles Charts, charting at number three. In Jackson's native Scotland, "Don't Call this Love" was considerably more successful. The single topped the Scottish Singles Charts and remained at the number one position for two weeks, before slipping to number five on the charts and being knocked off the top spot by the X Factor's cover version of Mariah Carey's "Hero".

"Creative" was released in November 2008 as the album's third single. To promote the track Jackson appeared on BBC Children in Need in November 2008, performing the song as an "exclusive". The song entered the UK Singles Charts at #94. "Stargazing" was released in February 2009 but did not reach the United Kingdom official chart. Yet again the song was only available via digital download. Jackson did not appear on any TV show to promote the single, nor was any music video created for the song. After "Stargazing" failed to chart, Jackson was dropped from the label. The BBC commented on "Stargazing", "While the lyrics for 'Stargazing' may be rather saccharine—rhyming 'star gazing' with 'amazing' is a bit too much to take—the pace and structure (along with all-important key change) makes it pretty special—which can be said about all the tracks here.

Jackson embarked on his debut solo concert tour across the UK shortly following the albums release, and featured a total of 20 dates. In April 2009, Jackson cancelled two shows, Manchester and Blackburn, which raised speculation that the tour would be cancelled entirely.

== Critical reception ==
Professional ratings
Review scores
Source	Rating
Orange	3/5 stars
BBC Music	(positive)
All Music	3.5/5 stars
OK Magazine	5/5 stars
Heat Magazine	4/5 stars
Digital Spy	2/5 stars
Entertainment.ie	2/5 stars

Right Now received mixed reviews. Digital Spy rated the album two out of five, saying "Jackson doesn't do a bad job, wrapping his warm, smooth vocals around a succession of beige ballads, classics that are too old for him (Leon Russell's 'A Song For You', Dorothy Moore's 'Misty Blue', Ray Charles's 'You Don't Know Me') and the odd uptempo big band number. But other than sounding surprisingly manly for a slight 19-year-old and singing in a Scottish accent for the first time on the album's penultimate track, he doesn't make much of an impression. He's rarely asked to test his range and there are few glimmers of personality across Right Now's 50 minutes."

== Chart performance ==
In Jackson's native Scotland, Right Now debuted on the Scottish Albums Charts at number two. The following week, Right Now slipped from number two to number five, followed by number eleven and twenty in week three and four respectively. In week five, an increase in sales saw Right Now climb two places, from number twenty to number eighteen in Scotland. Right Now would slip to number 21 in the following week and then to number 28 in its seventh week inside the charts. In its eighth week of release, Right Now managed to remain just inside the Scottish Top 40, charting at number 40 and then on 21 December it fell from the Scottish Top 40 entirely, sitting at number 46. Right Now went on to spend a total of twelve weeks inside the Scottish Top 100 Albums.

In the United Kingdom, Right Now debuted at number four on the week commencing 1 November 2008. The following week, the album fell from the UK Top 10 Albums where it charted at number twenty. It would spend a further week within the UK Top 40, charting at number 37 on 15 October before falling from the Top 40 entirely, falling to number 44 the following week (22 October). In the chart update for 29 October Right Now climbed two places up the chart, from number 44 to number 42. Right Now last charted at number 90 on the UK Albums Chart, and spent a total of ten weeks within the UK Top 100 Albums. Right Now received a Gold certification from the BPI in January 2009. It has sold 136,117 copies as of November 2015.

== Track listing ==
Right Now
No.	Title	Writer(s)	Length
1.	"Don't Call This Love"	Carl Falk, Chris Braide, Bryn Christopher	4:11
2.	"Creative"	Chris Porter, Howard New, Peter Gordeno	3:56
3.	"Stargazing"	Alan Chang, Savan Kotecha	4:13
4.	"All In Good Time"	Peter Gordeno	3:43
5.	"Right Now"	Carl Sigman, Herbie Mann	2:19
6.	"You Don't Know Me"	Cindy Walker, Arnold Eddy	4:05
7.	"Ordinary Days"	Andreas Romdhane, Josef Larossi, John Reid	4:09
8.	"A Song For You"	Leon Russell	3:52
9.	"Fingerprints"	Andreas Romdhane, Savan Kotecha	3:40
10.	"Could Do Better"	Peter Gordeno	4:12
11.	"Misty Blue"	Bob Montgomery	3:40
12.	"Caledonia"	Dougie Maclean	3:34
13.	"When You Believe"	Stephen Schwartz	4:14
Total length:			47:54

== Charts ==
=== Weekly charts ===
Weekly chart performance for Right Now
Chart (2008)	Peak position
Scottish Albums (OCC)	2
UK Albums (OCC)	4
Irish Albums (IRMA)	7
World Albums Top 100 (Billboard)	25
UK Album Downloads Chart (OCC)	5
UK Physical Album Chart (OCC)	4

=== Year–end charts ===
Year–end chart performance for Right Now
Region	Peak position
United Kingdom (OCC)	75

== Certifications ==
Certifications for Right Now
Region	Certification	Certified units/sales
United Kingdom (BPI)	Gold	150,000
Ireland (IRMA)	Platinum	15,000

== Release history ==
Region	Release date	Format	Label
Ireland	17 October 2008	CD, digital download	Syco Music, Sony BMG
United Kingdom	20 October 2008	CD, digital download	Syco Music, Sony BMG
