= Leon Jackson =

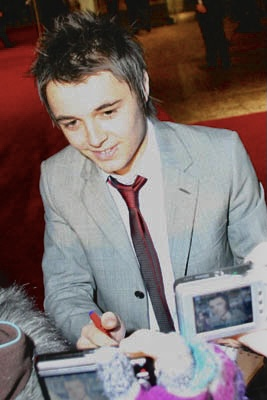
- Jackson attending the premiere of The Golden Compass in London, November 2007

Background information
- Born: Leon Jackson; 30 December 1988 (age 37); Whitburn, West Lothian, Scotland
- Genres: Pop, jazz, acoustic alternative music
- Instruments: Vocals, guitar, piano
- Years active: 2007–present
- Labels: Sony BMG, Syco, RCA Records
- Website: leonjacksonmusic.com

Leon Jackson (born 30 December 1988) is a Scottish singer–songwriter. Born and raised in Whitburn, he won the fourth series of the ITV talent show The X Factor in 2007. Following his win, he starred in his on-web series entitled Leon's Life (2007–2008). Jackson's debut single, "When You Believe", reached number one in his native Scotland, Ireland and the United Kingdom, where it became the Christmas number one of 2007. It sold over 400,000 copies, becoming the third best-selling single of 2007, and ranked the 92nd best-selling single of the 2000s in the UK. "When You Believe" was named the best selling single by a British Male Artist in 2007.

His debut album, Right Now (2008), reached number two on the albums charts in his native Scotland, whilst in the United Kingdom it debuted at number four and seven in Ireland. It was subsequently certified Gold by the British Phonographic Industry (BPI), and finished the year as the 75th best-selling album in the UK. The albums lead single, "Don't Call This Love", reached number one in Scotland, the top ten in the United Kingdom and Ireland, and the top ten of the European Hot 100 Singles. Following the moderate commercial success of his next singles "Creative" and "Stargazing", Jackson departed from his record label.

Following a hiatus from recording music, Jackson ventured in songwriting – collaborating with Vince Kidd and Lady Leshurr on the single "Sick Love". "When You Believe" currently ranks as the seventh best-selling X Factor winners single, outselling Little Mix with "Cannonball", Sam Bailey with "Skyscraper" and Louisa Johnson with "Forever Young". His debut album also ranks as the eighth best-selling debut album from an X Factor winner, beating Ben Haenow with his self-titled debut album and Joe McElderry with Wide Awake.

== Early life ==
Leon Jackson was born in Whitburn, West Lothian, Scotland. Before pursuing his singing career, he worked as a retail sales assistant with Gap. He is a supporter of Rangers. He was a fan of contemporary jazz, his hero being Michael Bublé, and he has stated that during his early years, karate and singing were the only things that made him happy. He got his black belt at the age of 10. Before he appeared on The X Factor, Jackson was planning to attend Edinburgh Napier University, studying architectural technology.

Leon started singing in public in January 2007. He wanted to pursue a career in music so he entered X Factor and, after doing well in the competition, deferred his place at Edinburgh Napier.

== Career ==
=== 2007–2008: The X Factor ===
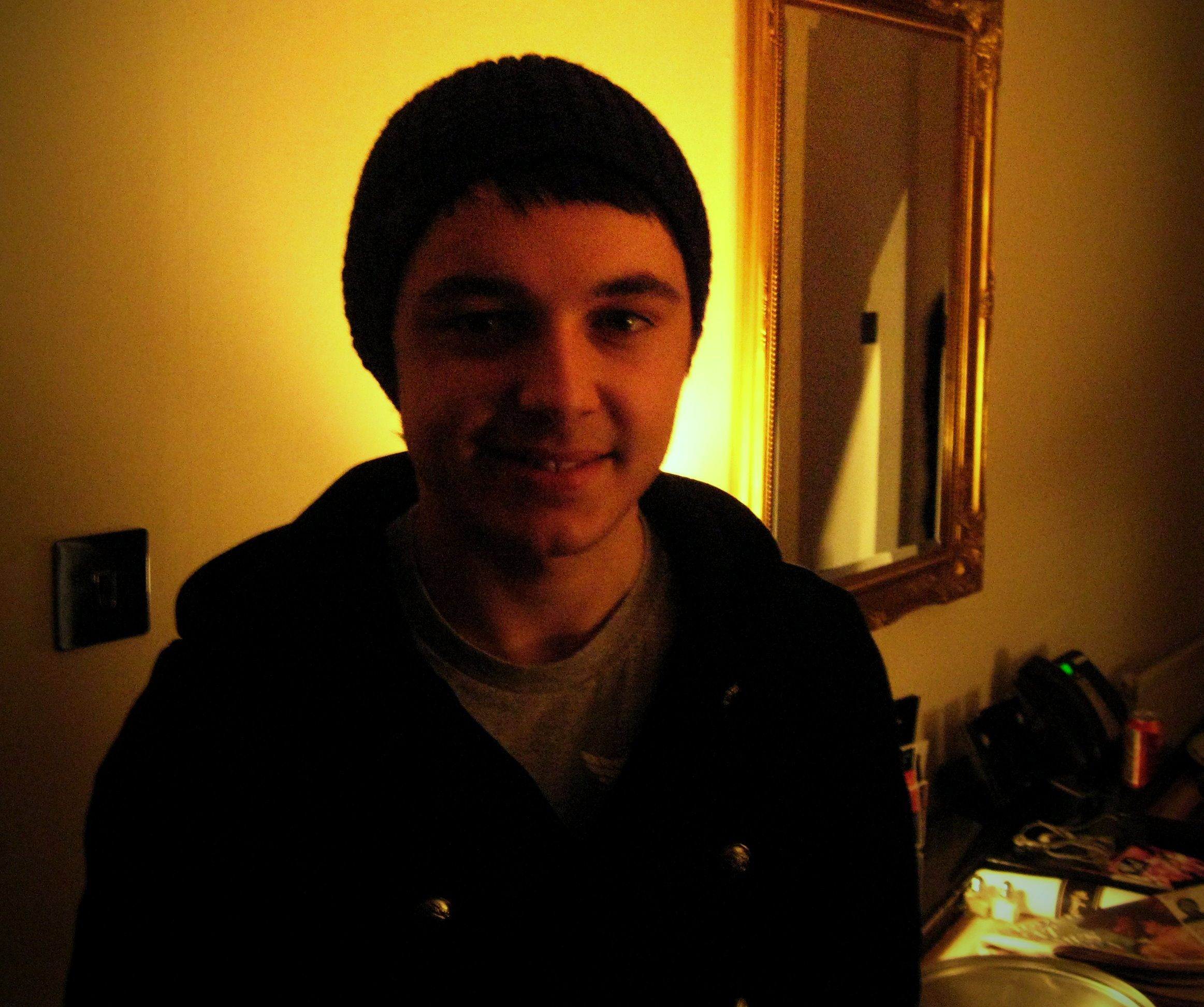
Jackson in 2007 during his time on The X Factor

In 2007, Leon Jackson auditioned for the fourth series of The X Factor in Glasgow, being filmed at the city's Crowne Plaza Hotel. During the show, he was mentored by Dannii Minogue. After progressing through the rounds, he reached the final on 15 December 2007, in which he performed a duet with Kylie Minogue of "Better the Devil You Know", as well as three other songs. After the public vote, he was declared winner, receiving a £1 million recording contract with Simon Cowell's company Syco, a division of Sony BMG.

Jackson was an outsider to win the competition, and his victory was described as "the biggest shock in the history of reality TV betting." X Factor judge Louis Walsh later said that Jackson had won the vote by about 10%. A number of viewers complained to watchdog Ofcom that they were unable to get through to vote for Jackson's rival Rhydian Roberts, but an Ofcom investigation found that Roberts had not been unfairly disadvantaged. More than 12 million people watched the final of Leon winning. Jackson described winning as "not real".

In December 2007, Jackson was invited to perform with Canadian performer Michael Bublé at Wembley Arena, singing Bublé's "Home" because Bublé was so impressed by his singing ability. Jackson later said this had been the highlight of his life, because Bublé is his idol. Leon was the first and so far only X Factor contestant to perform at Wembley while still in the competition. with Rhydian Roberts the runner-up and Dannii Minogue emerging as the winning mentor.

The series hit the headlines even before recording began. Some of the controversy centred upon whether 14 and 15-year-olds should be eligible to enter, and also on the high-profile dismissals of judge Louis Walsh and presenter Kate Thornton, to be replaced by choreographer and Grease Is the Word judge Brian Friedman and Big Brother's Little Brother host Dermot O'Leary respectively. Before hiring Freidman and Minogue, Cowell had apparently approached colleague and fellow American Idol judge Randy Jackson, and close friend and X Factor mentor Sinitta. Walsh, however, was quickly reinstated, with Friedman becoming the show's choreographer. Jackson's prize as winner was a £1 million recording contract. His first single release was "When You Believe", arranged for the finalists by composer Stephen Schwartz and released to download on 16 December 2007, with the physical format following on 19 December. The single became that year's Christmas Number One in the UK Singles Chart. The series was Sharon Osbourne's final series as a judge and was replaced the following year by Girls Aloud star Cheryl Cole.

On 11 February 2008, Jackson began the "X Factor Live" tour in the Odyssey Arena in Belfast, Northern Ireland with Rhydian Roberts, Same Difference and the eight other finalists from the 2007 show. They continued the tour in other venues around the UK until 21 March when the tour finished at London's Wembley Arena, thus concluding The X Factor 2007.

The X Factor performances and results
Show	Song choice	Theme	Result
Audition	“Home” – Michael Bublé	—N/a	Through to bootcamp
Bootcamp (Part 1)	“Lost” – Michael Bublé	—N/a	Through to the next day of bootcamp
Bootcamp (Part 2)	“Home” – Michael Bublé	—N/a	Through to judges' houses
Judges' houses	“I Still Haven't Found What I'm Looking For” – U2	—N/a	Through to live shows
Live show 1	"Can't Buy Me Love" - The Beatles	Number ones	5th
Live show 2	“Home” – Michael Bublé	Film theme	2nd
Live show 3	“Fly Me to the Moon” – Frank Sinatra	Big band	2nd
Live show 4	"Dancing in the Moonlight" - Toploader	21st century classics	1st
Live show 5	"Relight My Fire" - Take That feat. Lulu	Disco	1st
Live show 6	"You Don't Know Me" - Eddy Arnold	Love song	1st
Quarter-Final	"Crazy Little Thing Called Love" - Queen	British classics	1st
Quarter-Final	"The Long and Winding Road" - The Beatles	British classics	1st
Semi-Final	"The Very Thought of You" - Ray Noble	Mentor's choice	1st
Semi-Final	“How Sweet It Is (To Be Loved by You)” – Marvin Gaye	Contestant's choice	1st
Final	"White Christmas" - Bing Crosby with Ken Darby Singers & John Scott Trotter and His Orchestra & Chorus	Christmas song	Winner
Final	“Better the Devil You Know” (with Kylie Minogue)	Celebrity duet	Winner
Final	"You Don't Know Me" - Eddy Arnold	Song of the series	Winner
Final	"When You Believe" - Mariah Carey & Whitney Houston	Winners single	Winner

=== 2008–2009: Right Now ===
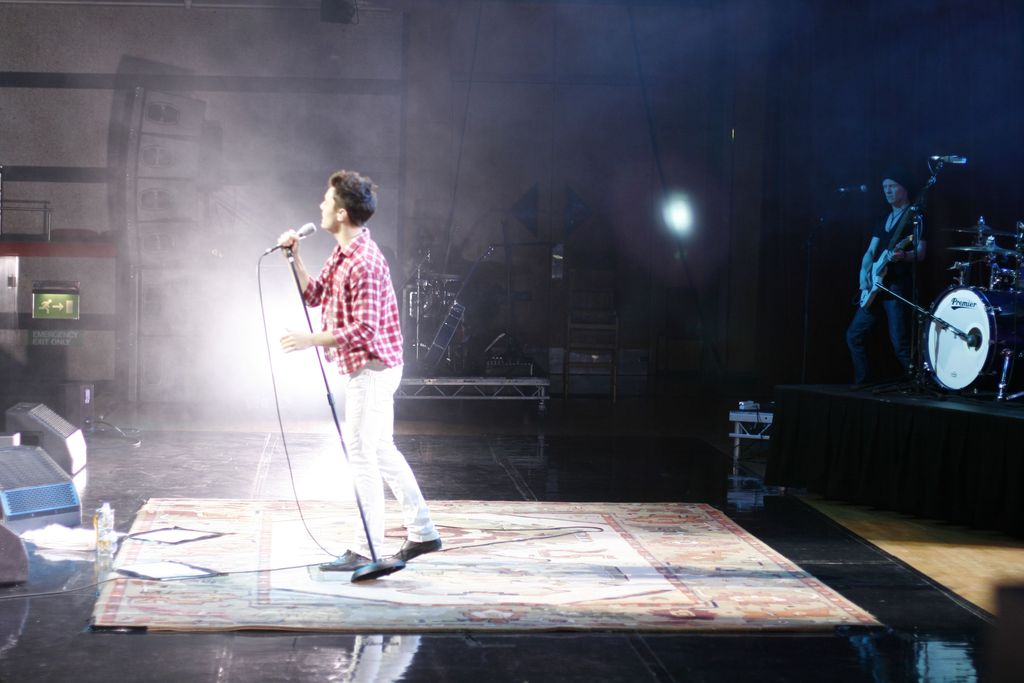
Jackson performing live during the Right Now UK Tour (2009)

Jackson's debut single, a cover of the Whitney Houston and Mariah Carey duet "When You Believe" went on sale as a download from midnight on Sunday, 16 December 2007 and as a CD on Wednesday, 19 December 2007. The debut single is set to be the fastest-selling single of 2007, with sales predicted to reach 300,000 by Sunday. At Woolworths the single at its peak was selling 40 copies per minute. Bookmakers reportedly stopped taking bets on who would get the 2007 Christmas number-one single, as "Leon [was] practically guaranteed top spot". "When You Believe" indeed reached number one in the UK on 23 December 2007. This made Jackson the first Scottish artist to achieve a Christmas number one.

In July 2008, Bublé again invited Jackson to join him on stage at the Glasgow SECC for a duet of "Lost". Jackson appeared as a celebrity guest on the first live episode of series five of The X Factor on 11 October 2008, to perform the first single, "Don't Call This Love", from his upcoming album Right Now. The song was released the next day, and peaked at No. 1 on the Scottish Singles Charts, No. 3 on the UK singles chart and No. 8 in Ireland. The album was released on 20 October 2008, and debuted at No. 4 on the UK Albums Charts, No. 7 on the Irish Albums Charts, and debuted at No. 2 on the albums charts in his native Scotland. The second single from the album, "Creative", was released as a download-only purchase in late 2008. It peaked at No. 94 on 29 November 2008 on the UK Singles chart. The third and final single, "Stargazing", was released to radio stations in January 2009. It was also made available for purchase as a download-only single. The album sold 130,000 copies and Jackson was dropped from the Sony BMG label.

Jackson proceeded to work with writers who have worked with Paolo Nutini and James Morrison. Jackson said that he was focusing on preparing for an upcoming concert tour of the UK, which would take place in May and June 2009. In December 2008, Jackson was one of the musical guest performers, alongside Sharleen Spiteri, on Hogmanay Live, the BBC Scotland Hogmanay broadcast, hosted by Jackie Bird from Edinburgh Castle. It was announced that Jackson was also to perform at the Edinburgh Hogmanay Street Party, however, Jackson pulled out of the event due to tonsillitis where he would have been playing with Scottish singer Amy MacDonald. Scottish singer and songwriter Sandi Thom had lined up Jackson as a Supporting Guest Act in Glasgow as part of her Homecoming Scotland 2009 Tour. As of April 2009 half of the concert dates had been cancelled by the management. The reason why the dates were cancelled is unknown, but Leon said he was "gutted" at the cancellations and that it was not his doing. All but two of the joint tour days from England and Wales remained (with support act Same Difference playing a solo tour gig in Portsmouth), while seven of the nine tour dates in Scotland remained.

=== 2010–2011: Departure from Sony and tour ===
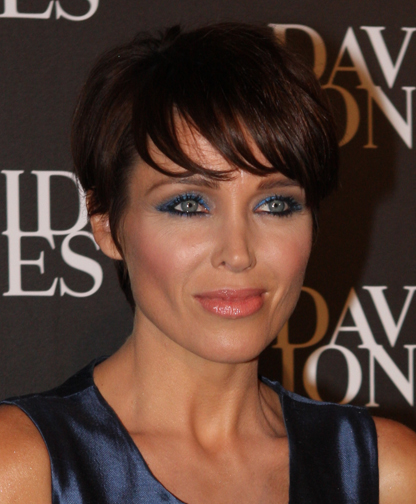
Jackson confirmed that he was "not in contact" with Dannii Minogue (pictured) or Simon Cowell by 2010

In 2009, Jackson confirmed that he was working on a brand new studio album which would be more acoustic in style, different from the jazz and soul genre of his debut album Right Now. Even though Jackson has failed to find another record deal since he got dropped by his label Sony BMG in March 2009, he hopes to release the album independently. He travelled to Los Angeles in May 2010 to work with songwriters to come up with tracks for his new sound. He worked with artists, including Ernie Halter, to create piano and guitar led songs, as well as writing some himself. Whilst in L.A, he also performed at 'The Gypsy Lounge' with American artists.

In May 2010, Jackson was announced as the 2nd biggest reality TV flop, winning 76% of the 1,300 people polled, losing out only to Steve Brookstein. He has vowed never to perform "When You Believe" again, calling his X-Factor success a curse and revealing he was no longer in contact with former mentor Dannii Minogue or Simon Cowell subsequent to being dropped by Syco Music. Jackson said he felt "crushed" by Cowell after finding out through the newspaper that Cowell had dropped him.

Jackson then announced a summer tour in 2010 where he would perform his new acoustic sound. The first date was at the Half Moon, Putney, London on 8 June. Leon performed guitar and piano-led songs. The second date was at the ABC Glasgow on 10 July, where he sold out the show and more tickets were put on sale due to popular demand. The final date of the tour was on 31 July at the O2 Academy Birmingham, where Jackson again performed new songs written by himself and American songwriters.

On 16 February 2011, Jackson attended the 2011 BRIT Awards as part of the Universal Records after-party. Jackson has been writing new material and taught himself to play the guitar and piano, which he has brought into his new songs. Some of the new songs include 'Never Left The Ground', 'Ode to Isabel', 'The Other Side', 'See It Through Your Eyes' and 'Wounded by Love'. Jackson will debut at least four new songs at several summer festivals in 2011.

=== 2012–2016: Songwriting ===
Jackson co-wrote The Voice UK's contestant Vince Kidd's debut single - "Sick Love" - along with Kidd. Jackson worked on a number of songs with Vince Kidd, with Kidd referring to Jackson as a "friend" and being "really very talented and a unique character". The partnership came from Jackson phoning Kidd to ask if he wanted to "hang out". Described as a situation that was "real spontaneous", Kidd claimed that the song is "controversial because we were just having fun, not caring who would hear it", and saying that the song "is the most unlikely song an X Factor winner would ever pen".

The song was a moderate commercial success, debuting at thirty-four on the Hip Hop and R&B Singles Chart in the United Kingdom. Whilst it failed to reach the Top 100 of the official singles charts in the United Kingdom, it did appear within the Top 200 of the main UK Singles Charts.

=== 2016–present: Second album and charity ===
As of 2016, Jackson has been residing in Los Angeles, California in the United States where he is writing and recording new music for a second studio album, however, as of September 2021, a release date or any further information about a forthcoming album has still to be announced. Jackson released a statement on his website in 2016 to fans, highlighting the reasons for Jackson's absence from the music industry following the release of his debut album in 2008. Jackson claimed that he felt he needed time to "evaluate everything that happened" and that he had to "fall in love with music again".

Jackson has committed time and his influence to charitable causes, including raising money for the Glasgow Children's Hospital. In January 2024, Jackson posted on his official Instagram account indicating new music would be released in 2024.

== Other ventures ==
Jackson supports the Children's Hospice Association Scotland (CHAS), a Scottish charity established to provide hospice services in Scotland for children and young people with life-limiting conditions. According to Jackson's own website: “As far as team Leon is concerned music is about life not the other way round. It’s a privilege to be able use your gifting to bring joy to people, travelling and paying the bills is a bonus". Following Jackson's X Factor win in 2007, Jackson appeared in his own web series, Leon's Life, which was solely broadcast on the social networking site, Bebo.

In April 2008, Leon Jackson was awarded the Sunday Mail Young Scot Award at Glasgow City Hall for being a positive role model to young people. In 2011, Jackson was the host of the Sunday Mail 2011 Young Scot Awards which were held in August 2011 in Glasgow at the Glasgow International Hilton Hotel. In May 2011, he was nominated at the Johnnie Walker Blue Label "Great" Awards.

== Concert tours ==
Headlining

- The X Factor Tour (2008)
- Right Now: UK & Ireland Tour (2009)
- Live & Acoustic Summer Tour (2010)

Supporting

- Sandi Thom – 2009 Homecoming Scotland Tour (Support act in Glasgow)

== Discography ==
Studio albums

- Right Now (2008)

== Filmography ==
Year	Title	Role	Notes	Ref.
2008–2009	Leon's Life	Himself	Main role Bebo web series	
2008	BBC Scotland's Hogmanay	Performer	BBC Scotland Hogmanay broadcast	

== See also ==
- List of artists who reached number one in Ireland
- List of artists who reached number one on the UK Singles Chart

Preceded by Leona Lewis	Winner of The X Factor; 2007	Succeeded by Alexandra Burke
