= The X Factor (British TV series) series 5 =

British TV competition

The X Factor
- Series 5
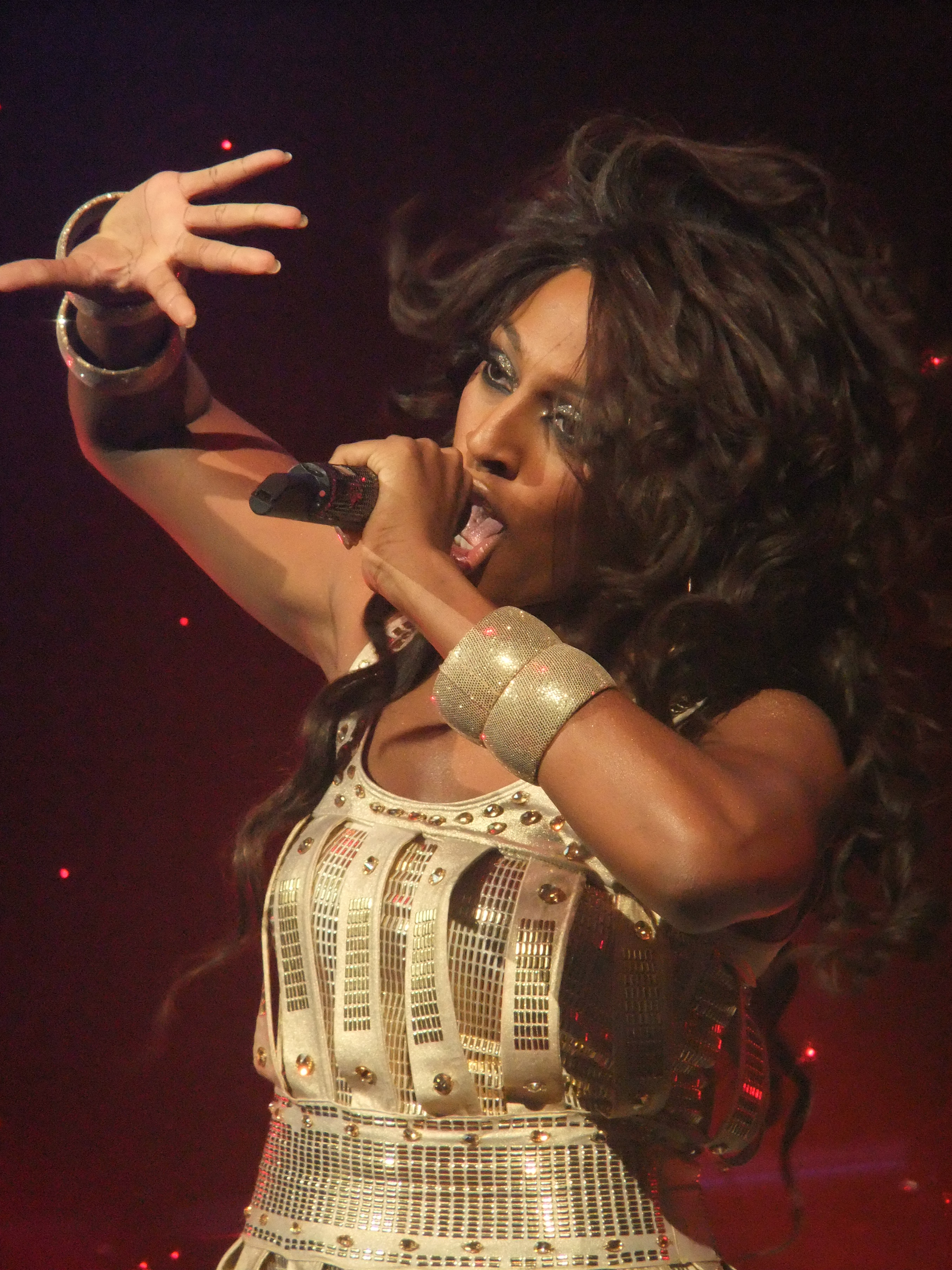
- Burke during her All Night Long Tour in 2011.
- Hosted by: Dermot O'Leary (ITV); Holly Willoughby(ITV2)
- Judges: Simon Cowell; Cheryl Cole; Dannii Minogue; Louis Walsh
- Winner: Alexandra Burke
- Winning mentor: Cheryl Cole
- Runner-up: JLS

Release
- Original network: ITV; ITV2 (The Xtra Factor)
- Original release: 16 August – 13 December 2008

Series chronology
- ← Previous; Series 4 Next → Series 6

The X Factor is a British television music competition to find new singing talent. The fifth series was broadcast on ITV from 16 August 2008 until 13 December 2008. Dermot O'Leary returned to present the main show on ITV, while Fearne Cotton was replaced by Holly Willoughby as presenter of spin-off show The Xtra Factor on ITV2. Simon Cowell, Louis Walsh, and Dannii Minogue returned to the judging panel. Sharon Osbourne left after four series and was replaced by Cheryl Cole. The series was won by Alexandra Burke, with Cole emerging as the winning mentor. Auditions in front of producers were held in April and May, with callbacks in front of the judges in June. The number of applicants for series 5 reached an all-time high with a reported 182,000 people auditioning. A number of well-established music acts from around the world, such as Beyoncé, Mariah Carey, Britney Spears, Girls Aloud, Take That, Il Divo, and series 3 winner Leona Lewis, performed during the live stages of the show.

Burke's prize, as winner, was a £1 million recording contract with Syco Music (a subsidiary of Sony BMG). Her debut single, "Hallelujah", written by Leonard Cohen, was released for digital download on 14 December 2008, with the physical format following on 17 December. It was later announced that her single had become the fastest-selling X Factor single at that time.

It was during auditions for the fifth series of the show that viewers were introduced to two teenagers: 15-year-old Jade Thirlwall, who would form one quarter of the winning act of series eight, Little Mix, and 14-year-old Liam Payne, who would become a member of boy band One Direction, formed in the seventh series.

== Judges, Presenters and Other Personnel ==
Judges and Presenter(s) for The X Factor Series 5

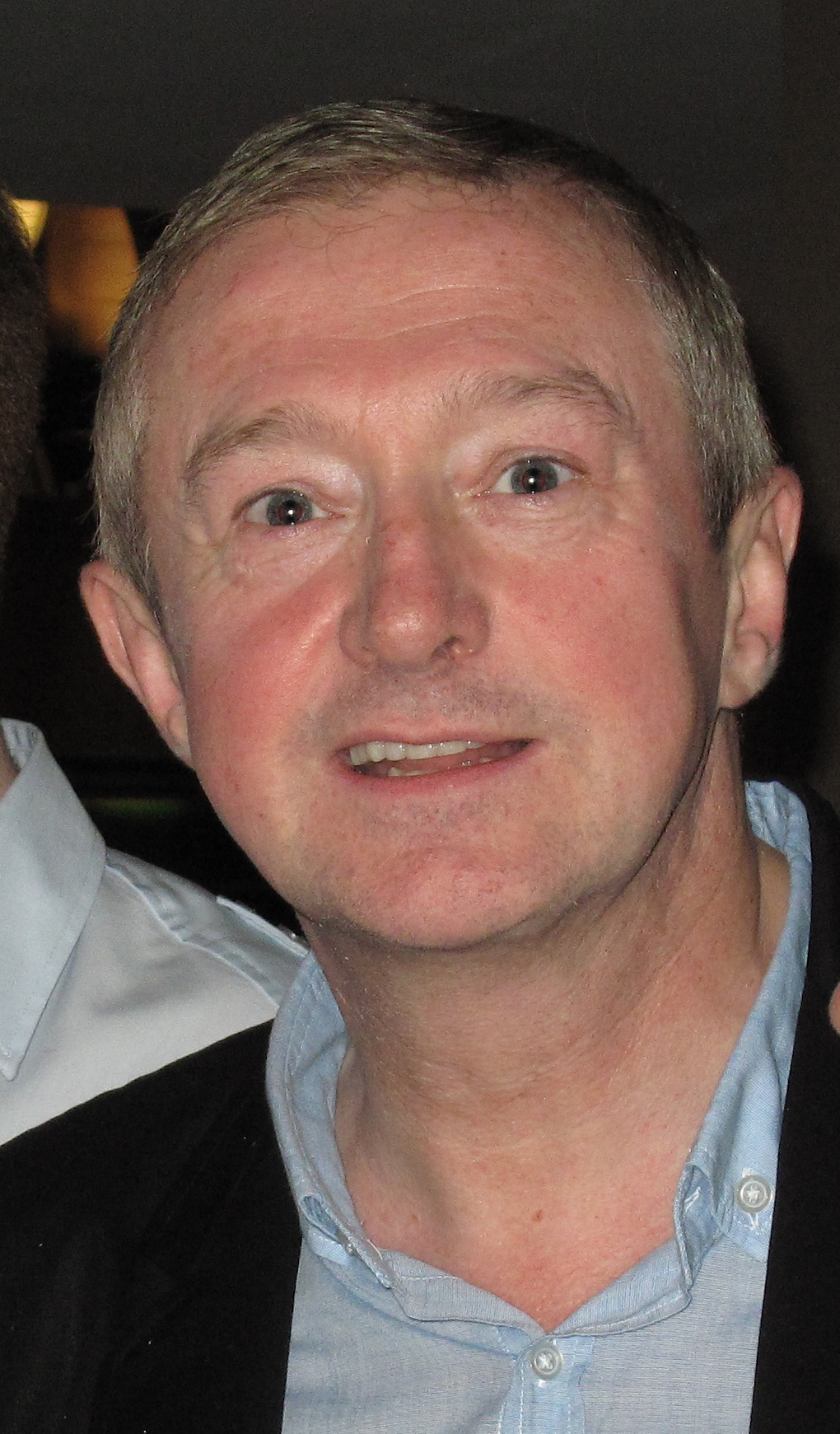
Louis Walsh

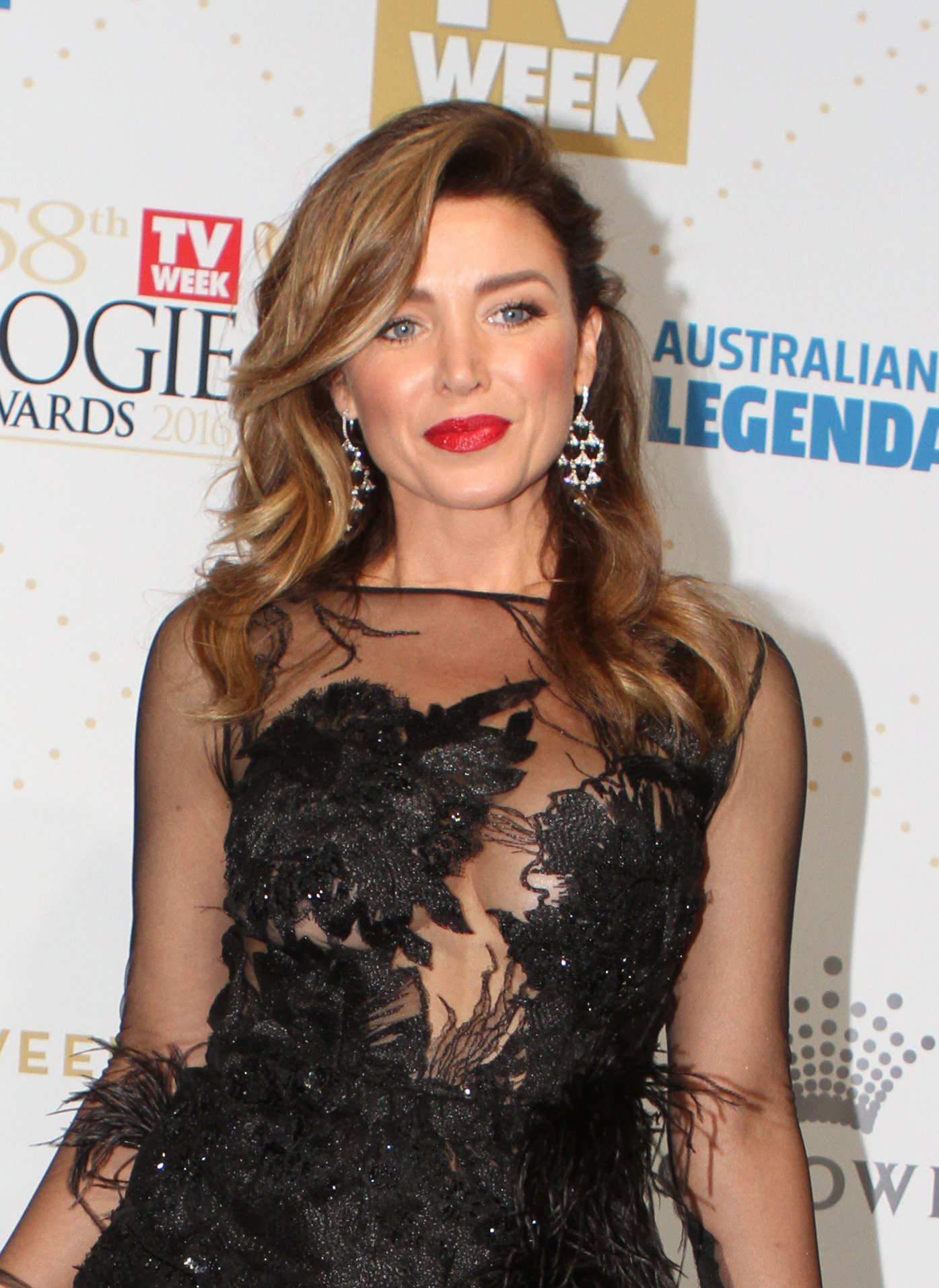
Dannii Minogue

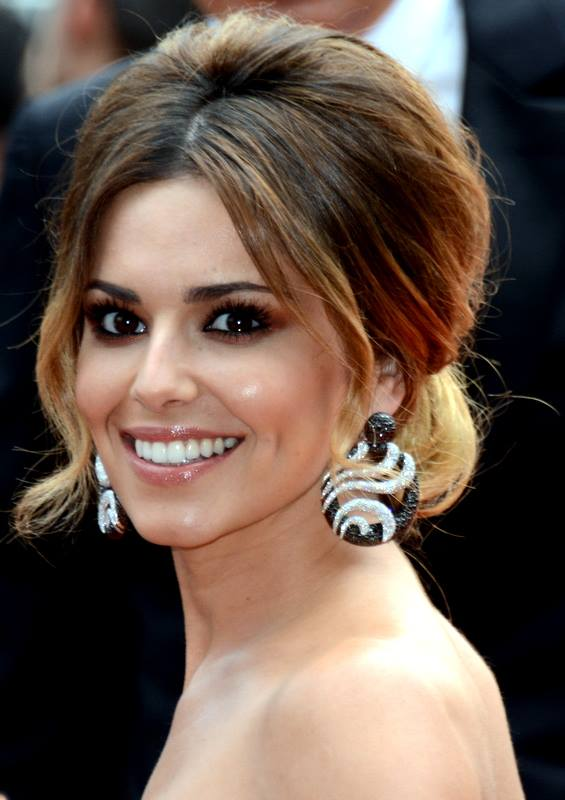
Cheryl Cole

Simon Cowell

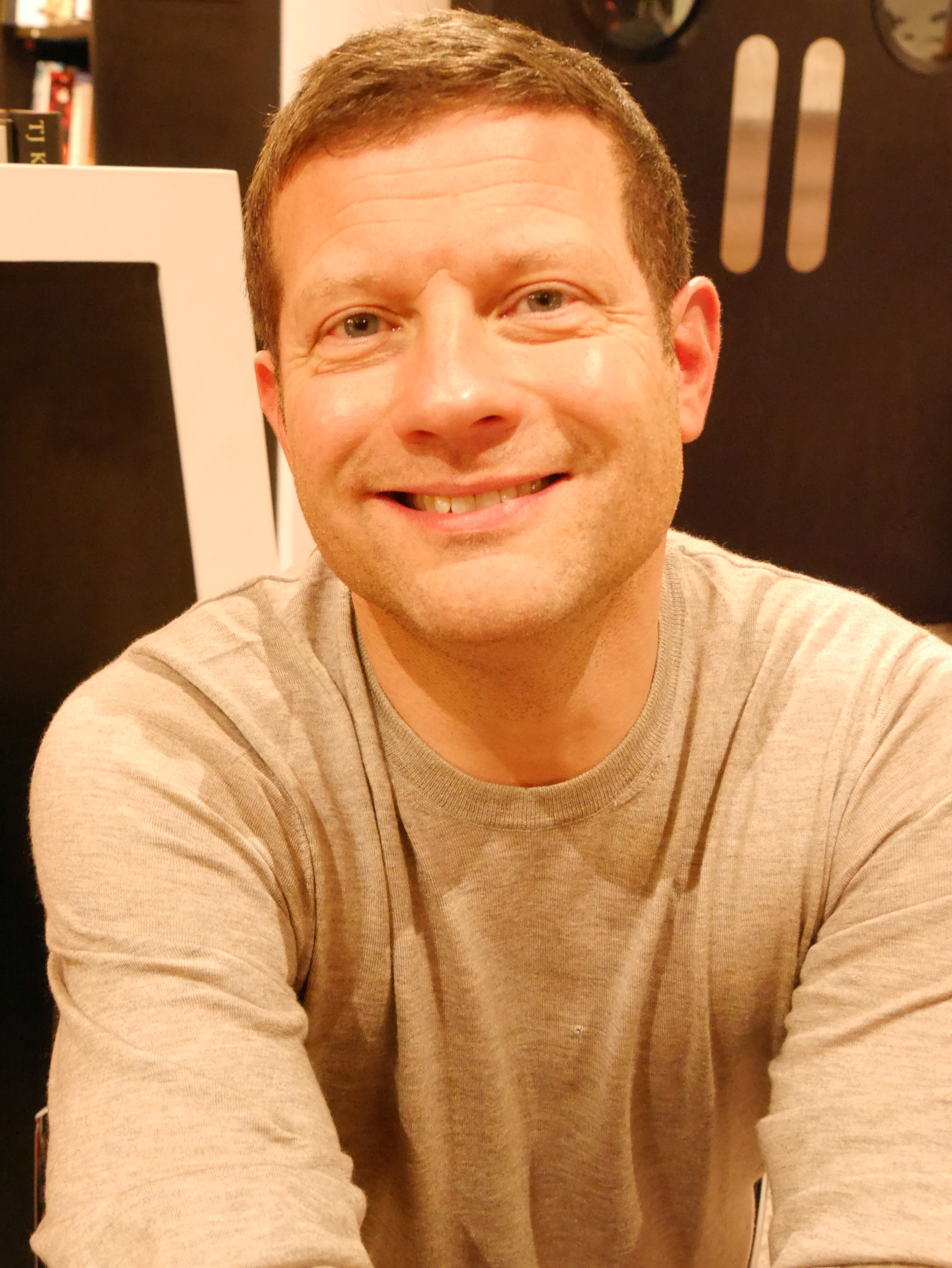
Dermot O'Leary (ITV1)

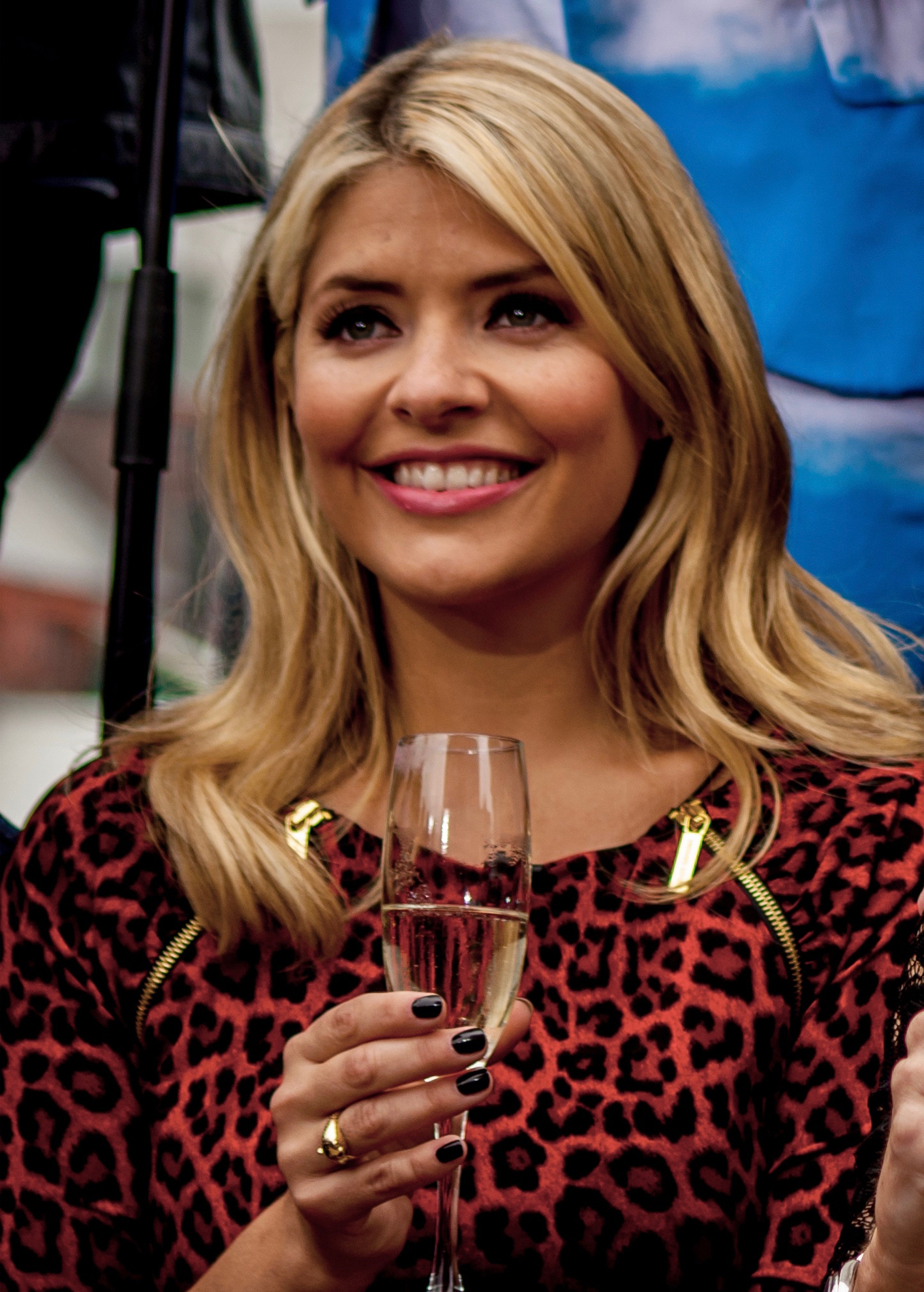
Holly Willoughby (ITV2)

In February 2008, it was reported that Sharon Osbourne would not return as a judge for the fifth series. On 6 June, six days before filming was due to begin at the London auditions, ITV announced Osbourne's departure from the show. Media speculation over the reasons for Osbourne's departure alluded to rising tensions between her and fellow judge Dannii Minogue, as well as disputes over pay. When interviewed by Chris Moyles on BBC Radio 1, Osbourne said that it was "the best four years of [her] life" but felt that it was "time to move on."

On 10 June 2008, after Osbourne's departure, ITV confirmed that Girls Aloud singer Cheryl Cole was the new judge and Osbourne's replacement for series 5. Minogue praised the new judge, saying, "She's very knowledgeable about music and I think she's going to bring a new side to the show." Cowell is reported by Minogue to feel that Cole's voiced opinions are something "which he loves".

Dermot O'Leary returned to present the main ITV show, choosing to leave other projects, including his ongoing role as the host of Big Brother's Little Brother, to concentrate on The X Factor. The Xtra Factor presenter Fearne Cotton left after series 4, having presented for only one series, to be replaced by Holly Willoughby. Brian Friedman returned as choreographer and performance coach (billed as "Creative Director"), along with Yvie Burnett as vocal coach.

== Selection process ==
=== Auditions ===
Cities that auditions were held in.

A reported "record-breaking" 182,000 applied for series 5, with filming for auditions in front of judges taking place in June/July 2008. Auditions were held in the cities of London, Birmingham, Manchester, Cardiff, and Glasgow.

Due to her filming commitments with Australia's Got Talent, Minogue was absent from some of the auditions in Birmingham and Cardiff but was not replaced.

=== Bootcamp ===
As in series 4, all four judges worked together at the bootcamp stage of the competition. This took place at indigO_{2} at The O_{2} in Greenwich, London on 4 August 2008, and was televised in two episodes on 27 and 28 September 2008. Contestants are said to have stayed in a nearby hotel in Blackheath.

During bootcamp, around 150 acts were whittled down to 24 who advanced to the next round, six in each category. After completion of bootcamp, the judges were told the category that they were to mentor. Cowell was given the Boys, Walsh the Groups, Minogue the Over 25s, and Cole the Girls.

=== Judges' houses ===
This round was filmed in late August and early September and was broadcast over two shows on 4 and 5 October. As in previous years, the judges welcomed the six acts from their selected category to their "homes". Each act had one chance to impress their mentor who, along with a guest judge, had the task of selecting which three acts were to go through to the live shows and which three would be eliminated. For her guest judge, Minogue chose former Spice Girls member and Emma Bunton, Cole chose her fellow Girls Aloud member Kimberly Walsh, Cowell chose singer Sinitta, and Walsh chose Shane Filan from Westlife.

Judges Houses Performances

- Act in bold advanced

Boys:

- **Eoghan: "Father and Son"**
- Liam: "A Million Love Songs"
- Mali: "All in Love Is Fair"
- **Austin: "She's Out of My Life"**
- **Scott: "I Can't Make You Love Me"**
- Alan: "All or Nothing"

Over 25s:

- **Daniel: "Against All Odds"**
- **Ruth: "True Colors"**
- Louise: "I Say a Little Prayer"
- James: "Mr. Bojangles"
- Suzie: "One Day I'll Fly Away"
- **Rachel: "Beautiful"**

Groups:

- 4Instinct: "Rockin' Robin"
- **Girlband: "Valerie"**
- **JLS: "No Air"**
- Priority: "Umbrella"
- **Bad Lashes: "Wonderwall"**
- Desire: "Shine"

Girls:

- **Diana: "Nothing Compares 2 U"**
- Amy: "Sweet About Me"
- Hannah: "Piece of My Heart"
- **Laura: "Cry Me a River"**
- Annastasia: "Oh Baby I..."
- **Alexandra: "Listen"**

Summary of judges' houses
Judge	Category	Location	Assistant	Acts Eliminated
Cole	Girls	Cannes	Kimberley Walsh	Annastasia Baker, Hannah Bradbeer, Amy Connelly
Cowell	Boys	Barbados	Sinitta	Mali-Michael McCalla, Liam Payne, Alan Turner
Minogue	Over 25s	Saint-Tropez	Emma Bunton	Suzie Furlonger, Louise Heatley, James Williams
Walsh	Groups	Castle Leslie, Ireland	Shane Filan	4Instinct, Desire, Priority

== Acts ==
Key:

– Winner
– Runner-Up

Act	Age(s)	Hometown	Category (mentor)	Result
Alexandra Burke	20	London	Girls (Cole)	Winner
JLS	20–23	London and Peterborough	Groups (Walsh)	Runner-up
Eoghan Quigg	16	Dungiven, Northern Ireland	Boys (Cowell)	3rd place
Diana Vickers	17	Accrington	Girls (Cole)	4th place
Ruth Lorenzo	26	Murcia, Spain	Over 25s (Minogue)	5th place
Rachel Hylton	27	London	Over 25s (Minogue)	6th place
Daniel Evans	39	Leyton	Over 25s (Minogue)	7th place
Laura White	21	Atherton, Greater Manchester	Girls (Cole)	8th place
Austin Drage	22	Grays, Essex	Boys (Cowell)	9th place
Scott Bruton	19	Manchester	Boys (Cowell)	10th place
Girlband	18–22	Various	Groups (Walsh)	11th place
Bad Lashes	19–24	Various	Groups (Walsh)	12th place

== Live shows ==
The live shows began on 11 October 2008 and continued through to the finale on 13 December 2008. An added twist for this series, confirmed on the first live show, was that acts in the bottom-two showdown sang a new song of their own choosing, rather than repeating the song they performed in the first part of the show.

=== Musical guests ===
Leon Jackson performed on the first live show, promoting his second single "Don't Call This Love". Girls Aloud performed their new single "The Promise" on the second show on 18 October. Will Young performed his new song "Grace" on 1 November. Mariah Carey appeared on 8 November and performed her new single "I Stay in Love", plus a special version of "Hero" with 11 of the finalists (Diana Vickers was ill with laryngitis so could not perform). Leona Lewis appeared the week after and performed her new single "Run". Take That performed on 22 November show, as did series 4 contestant Same Difference, who performed their debut single, and series 4 runner-up Rhydian Roberts, who sang a track from his debut album. On 29 November show, in the main programme Miley Cyrus performed her single "7 Things", whereas Britney Spears performed her new single "Womanizer" during the result show. On 6 December show, Il Divo sung their latest single "Amazing Grace" from their new album.

Boyzone, Westlife, and Beyoncé were guests on the final show where they duetted with the finalists, with Knowles performing "Listen" with Alexandra Burke. Beyoncé also performed "If I Were a Boy" in the final result show.

=== Results summary ===
Colour key

Act in Boys

Act in Girls

Act in Over 25s

Act in Groups

–	Act was in the bottom two and had to sing again in the final showdown
–	Act received the fewest public votes and was immediately eliminated (no final showdown)
–	Act received the most public votes
–	Act was given a bye and automatically advanced to the following week

Weekly results per act
Act	Week 1	Week 2	Week 3	Week 4	Week 5	Week 6	Week 7	Quarter-Final	Semi-Final	Final	
Act	Week 1	Week 2	Week 3	Week 4	Week 5	Week 6	Week 7	Quarter-Final	Semi-Final	First Vote	Second Vote
Alexandra Burke	6th 7.20%	7th 7.15%	6th 8.83%	6th 8.82%	2nd 18.35%	4th 13.31%	4th 14.97%	1st 24.53%	2nd 31.04%	1st 44.02%	Winner; 58.34%
JLS	7th 5.03%	3rd 9.21%	4th 10.81%	2nd 17.00%	4th 13.26%	5th 9.91%	5th 11.75%	2nd 24.34%	1st 35.03%	2nd 30.65%	Runner-Up; 41.66%
Eoghan Quigg	1st 21.19%	1st 26.77%	1st 20.73%	1st 19.81%	1st 27.39%	2nd 19.56%	1st 31.79%	3rd 19.58%	3rd 21.14%	3rd 25.33%	Eliminated (final)
Diana Vickers	4th 7.35%	2nd 16.24%	2nd 15.13%	3rd 15.24%	Bye Week^{1}	1st 31.30%	2nd 18.94%	4th 16.32%	4th 12.79%	Eliminated (semi-final)	
Ruth Lorenzo	10th 3.47%	10th 2.95%	5th 8.93%	5th 10.25%	7th 6.94%	3rd 13.91%	3rd 16.07%	5th 15.23%	Eliminated (quarter-final)		
Rachel Hylton	8th 4.77%	8th 5.01%	3rd 12.21%	9th 3.81%	5th 10.39%	7th 4.48%	6th 6.48%	Eliminated (week 7)			
Daniel Evans	5th 7.21%	6th 8.23%	9th 5.94%	4th 10.83%	3rd 13.77%	6th 7.53%	Eliminated (week 6)				
Laura White	3rd 16.99%	4th 8.99%	7th 7.53%	7th 7.38%	6th 9.90%	Eliminated (week 5)					
Austin Drage	9th 3.63%	5th 8.98%	8th 6.22%	8th 6.86%	Eliminated (week 4)						
Scott Bruton	2nd 19.48%	9th 4.17%	10th 3.67%	Eliminated (week 3)							
Girlband	11th 2.17%	11th 2.30%	Eliminated (week 2)								
Bad Lashes	12th 1.51%	Eliminated (week 1)									
Final Showdown	Bad Lashes, Girlband	Girlband, Lorenzo	Bruton, Evans	Drage, Hylton	Lorenzo, White	Evans, Hylton	Hylton, JLS	No final showdown or judges' votes: results were based on public votes alone			
Walsh's vote to eliminate (Groups)	Bad Lashes	Lorenzo	Bruton	Drage	White	Evans	Hylton	No final showdown or judges' votes: results were based on public votes alone			
Minogue's vote to eliminate (Over 25s)	Girlband	Girlband	Bruton	Drage	White	N/A^{2}	JLS	No final showdown or judges' votes: results were based on public votes alone			
Cole's vote to eliminate (Girls)	Girlband	Girlband	Bruton	Drage	Lorenzo	Evans	Hylton	No final showdown or judges' votes: results were based on public votes alone			
Cowell's vote to eliminate (Boys)	Bad Lashes	Lorenzo	Evans	Hylton	White	Evans	Hylton	No final showdown or judges' votes: results were based on public votes alone			
Eliminated	Bad Lashes; 2 of 4 votes Deadlock	Girlband; 2 of 4 votes Deadlock	Scott Bruton; 3 of 4 votes Majority	Austin Drage; 3 of 4 votes Majority	Laura White; 3 of 4 votes Majority	Daniel Evans; 3 of 3 votes Majority	Rachel Hylton; 3 of 4 votes Majority	Ruth Lorenzo; 15.23% to save	Diana Vickers; 12.79% to save	Eoghan Quigg; 25.33% to save	JLS; 41.66% to win

The total number of votes cast for the entire series was 16,469,064.

^1 Due to illness, Diana Vickers did not perform during week 5 and automatically advanced to week 6.
^2 Minogue was not required to vote as there was already a majority.

=== Live show details ===
==== Week 1 (11 October) ====
- Theme: UK or USA number-one singles
- Musical guest: Leon Jackson ("Don't Call This Love")
- Best bits song: "Never Had a Dream Come True"

Acts' performances on the first live show
Act	Category (mentor)	Order	Song	Country	Result
Girlband	Groups (Walsh)	1	"Venus"	UK	Bottom Two
Austin Drage	Boys (Cowell)	2	"Every Breath You Take"	UK	Safe
Daniel Evans	Over 25s (Minogue)	3	"I Want to Know What Love Is"	USA	Safe
Alexandra Burke	Girls (Cole)	4	"I Wanna Dance with Somebody"	USA	Safe
JLS	Groups (Walsh)	5	"I'll Make Love to You"	USA	Safe
Scott Bruton	Boys (Cowell)	6	"Yeh Yeh"	UK	Safe
Rachel Hylton	Over 25s (Minogue)	7	"With Every Heartbeat"	UK	Safe
Diana Vickers	Girls (Cole)	8	"With or Without You"	USA	Safe
Bad Lashes	Groups (Walsh)	9	"It Must Have Been Love"	USA	Bottom Two
Eoghan Quigg	Boys (Cowell)	10	"Imagine"	UK	Safe (Highest Votes)
Ruth Lorenzo	Over 25s (Minogue)	11	"Take My Breath Away"	USA	Safe
Laura White	Girls (Cole)	12	"Fallin'"	USA	Safe
Final showdown details
Girlband	Groups (Walsh)	1	"That's What Friends Are For"		Saved
Bad Lashes	Groups (Walsh)	2	"Wonderwall"		Eliminated

Judges' votes to eliminate

- Cowell: Bad Lashes – gave no reason but described both acts as "shocking"; he later stated on The Xtra Factor that he felt Girlband had shown more emotion in their final showdown performance due to being shown in an earlier slot to be overlooked by the public.
- Cole: Girlband – gave no reason.
- Minogue: Girlband – gave no reason.
- Walsh: Bad Lashes – could not decide between two of his own acts and sent the result to deadlock.

With the acts in the bottom two receiving two votes each, the result went to deadlock and reverted to the earlier public vote. Bad Lashes were eliminated as the act with the fewest public votes.

==== Week 2 (18 October) ====
- Theme: Michael Jackson
- Musical guest: Girls Aloud ("The Promise")
- Best bits song: "I’ll Stand by You"

Acts' performances on the second live show
Act	Category (mentor)	Order	Song	Result
Alexandra Burke	Girls (Cole)	1	"I'll Be There"	Safe
Scott Bruton	Boys (Cowell)	2	"She's Out of My Life"	Safe
Ruth Lorenzo	Over 25s (Minogue)	3	"I Just Can't Stop Loving You"	Bottom Two
Girlband	Groups (Walsh)	4	"Heal the World"	Bottom Two
Laura White	Girls (Cole)	5	"You Are Not Alone"	Safe
Austin Drage	Boys (Cowell)	6	"Billie Jean"	Safe
Daniel Evans	Over 25s (Minogue)	7	"One Day in Your Life"	Safe
JLS	Groups (Walsh)	8	"The Way You Make Me Feel"	Safe
Diana Vickers	Girls (Cole)	9	"Man in the Mirror"	Safe
Rachel Hylton	Over 25s (Minogue)	10	"Dirty Diana"	Safe
Eoghan Quigg	Boys (Cowell)	11	"Ben"	Safe (Highest Votes)
Final showdown details
Ruth Lorenzo	Over 25s (Minogue)	1	"Purple Rain"	Saved
Girlband	Groups (Walsh)	2	"I Don't Want to Miss a Thing"	Eliminated

Judges' votes to eliminate

- Walsh: Ruth Lorenzo – backed his own act, Girlband.
- Minogue: Girlband – backed her own act, Ruth Lorenzo.
- Cole: Girlband – based on the final showdown performances.
- Cowell: Ruth Lorenzo – sent the result to deadlock as he wanted to give Girlband a second chance whereas he felt Lorenzo did not "play to her strengths".

With the acts in the bottom two receiving two votes each, the result went to deadlock and reverted to the earlier public vote. Girlband were eliminated as the act with the fewest public votes. During the show, a mistake was made in one of the overlays and Lorenzo's number was briefly displayed incorrectly, meaning any calls to that number would not have registered a vote. After the show, viewers complained that they had dialled this incorrect number and could not get through to vote for Lorenzo, but ITV insisted the issue should not have made any difference to the overall result as Lorenzo received more votes than Girlband and advanced to the third week after the result went to deadlock.

==== Week 3 (25 October) ====
- Theme: Big band
- Group performance: "Hero"
- Best Bits song: "Shine"

Acts' performances on the third live show
Act	Category (mentor)	Order	Song	Big Band Artist	Result
Scott Bruton	Boys (Cowell)	1	"That's Life"	Frank Sinatra	Bottom Two
Daniel Evans	Over 25s (Minogue)	2	"The Lady Is a Tramp"	Mitzi Green	Bottom Two
Laura White	Girls (Cole)	3	"God Bless the Child"	Billie Holiday	Safe
Eoghan Quigg	Boys (Cowell)	4	"L-O-V-E"	Nat King Cole	Safe (Highest Votes)
Ruth Lorenzo	Over 25s (Minogue)	5	"Summertime"	Ella Fitzgerald	Safe
Alexandra Burke	Girls (Cole)	6	"Candyman"	Christina Aguilera	Safe
Austin Drage	Boys (Cowell)	7	"Mack the Knife"	Bobby Darin	Safe
JLS	Groups (Walsh)	8	"Ain't That a Kick in the Head?"	Dean Martin	Safe
Diana Vickers	Girls (Cole)	9	"Smile"	Charlie Chaplin	Safe
Rachel Hylton	Over 25s (Minogue)	10	"Feeling Good"	Nina Simone	Safe
Final showdown details
Scott Bruton	Boys (Cowell)	1	"I Can't Make You Love Me"		Eliminated
Daniel Evans	Over 25s (Minogue)	2	"To Where You Are"		Saved

Judges' votes to eliminate

- Cowell: Daniel Evans – backed his own act, Scott Bruton.
- Cole: Scott Bruton – said that she felt the "belief and passion" in Evans' performance.
- Minogue: Scott Bruton – backed her own act, Daniel Evans, whom she stated sang the best in the sing off.
- Walsh: Scott Bruton – commented that Evans "sang every word like he meant it".

==== Week 4 (1 November) ====
- Theme: Disco
- Musical guest: Will Young ("Grace")
- Best Bits song: "Rule the World"

Acts' performances on the fourth live show
Act	Category (mentor)	Order	Song	Result
Rachel Hylton	Over 25s (Minogue)	1	"Lost in Music"	Bottom Two
Austin Drage	Boys (Cowell)	2	"Wishing on a Star"	Bottom Two
Diana Vickers	Girls (Cole)	3	"Call Me"	Safe
Daniel Evans	Over 25s (Minogue)	4	"Don't Leave Me This Way"	Safe
Laura White	Girls (Cole)	5	"Somebody Else's Guy"	Safe
Eoghan Quigg	Boys (Cowell)	6	"Could It Be Magic"	Safe (Highest Votes)
Ruth Lorenzo	Over 25s (Minogue)	7	"No More Tears (Enough Is Enough)"	Safe
Alexandra Burke	Girls (Cole)	8	"On the Radio"	Safe
JLS	Groups (Walsh)	9	"Working My Way Back To You"/"Forgive Me Girl"	Safe
Final showdown details
Rachel Hylton	Over 25s (Minogue)	1	"No More Drama"	Saved
Austin Drage	Boys (Cowell)	2	"Will You Still Love Me Tomorrow"	Eliminated

Judges' votes to eliminate

- Cowell: Rachel Hylton – backed his own act, Austin Drage.
- Cole: Austin Drage – stated she was prepared to give Hylton a "moment to shine".
- Minogue: Austin Drage – backed her own act, Rachel Hylton.
- Walsh: Austin Drage – said Hylton had more to give to the competition and was more of a "raw talent".

However, voting statistics revealed that Drage received more votes than Hylton which meant that if Walsh sent the result to deadlock, Drage would have been saved and Hylton would have been eliminated

==== Week 5 (8 November) ====
- Theme: Mariah Carey
- Guest Mentor: Mariah Carey
- Musical guest: Mariah Carey ("I Stay in Love" / "Hero")
- Best Bits song: "A Moment Like This"

Acts' performances on the fifth live show
Act	Category (mentor)	Order	Song	Result
Eoghan Quigg	Boys (Cowell)	1	"Anytime You Need a Friend"	Safe (Highest Votes)
Ruth Lorenzo	Over 25s (Minogue)	2	"My All"	Bottom Two
Laura White	Girls (Cole)	3	"Endless Love"	Bottom Two
Rachel Hylton	Over 25s (Minogue)	4	"Against All Odds (Take a Look at Me Now)"	Safe
Diana Vickers	Girls (Cole)	5	Bye Week^{1}	Automatically Advanced
JLS	Groups (Walsh)	6	"One Sweet Day"	Safe
Daniel Evans	Over 25s (Minogue)	7	"Open Arms"	Safe
Alexandra Burke	Girls (Cole)	8	"Without You"	Safe
Final showdown details
Ruth Lorenzo	Over 25s (Minogue)	1	"Knockin' on Heaven's Door"	Saved
Laura White	Girls (Cole)	2	"Over the Rainbow"	Eliminated

^1 Due to illness, Diana Vickers did not perform and automatically advanced to the following week. She was due to perform fifth and would have performed "Always Be My Baby".

Judges' votes to eliminate

- Cowell: Laura White – gave no reason but commented that both acts "were not the worst singers of the night".
- Cole: Ruth Lorenzo – backed her own act, Laura White.
- Minogue: Laura White – backed her own act, Ruth Lorenzo.
- Walsh: Laura White – commented that Lorenzo was "more of a fighter".

However, voting statistics revealed that White received more votes than Lorenzo which meant that if Walsh sent the result to deadlock, White would have been saved.

==== Week 6 (15 November) ====
- Theme: British classics
- Musical guest: Leona Lewis ("Run")
- Best Bits song: "Footprints in the Sand"

Acts' performances on the sixth live show
Act	Category (mentor)	Order	Song	British Artist	Result
Daniel Evans	Over 25s (Minogue)	1	"It's Not Unusual"	Tom Jones	Bottom Two
Alexandra Burke	Girls (Cole)	2	"You Are So Beautiful"	Joe Cocker	Safe
JLS	Groups (Walsh)	3	"I Want to Hold Your Hand"/"Twist and Shout"/"Hey Jude"	The Beatles	Safe
Rachel Hylton	Over 25s (Minogue)	4	"You Know I'm No Good"	Amy Winehouse	Bottom Two
Eoghan Quigg	Boys (Cowell)	5	"One More Try"	George Michael	Safe
Diana Vickers	Girls (Cole)	6	"Yellow"	Coldplay	Safe (Highest Votes)
Ruth Lorenzo	Over 25s (Minogue)	7	"Angels"	Robbie Williams	Safe
Final showdown details
Daniel Evans	Over 25s (Minogue)	1	"Bridge over Troubled Water"		Eliminated
Rachel Hylton	Over 25s (Minogue)	2	"One"		Saved

Judges' votes to eliminate

- Walsh: Daniel Evans – gave no reason but had constantly criticised Evans throughout the competition.
- Cole: Daniel Evans – stated that she had seen a spark back from Hylton this week.
- Cowell: Daniel Evans – gave no reason though commented that Hylton "threw it away" with her last performance and that he would have liked to see her perform with more passion; he later stated on The Xtra Factor that he wanted to save Hylton as she was one of his favorite acts in the competition.
- Minogue was not required to vote as there was already a majority; she stated she would have chosen to take the vote to deadlock as both acts were in her category.

However, voting statistics revealed than Evans received more votes than Hylton which meant that if the result went to deadlock, Evans would have been saved.

==== Week 7 (22 November) ====
- Theme: Take That
- Guest Mentors: Gary Barlow & Mark Owen
- Musical guests: Take That ("Greatest Day"), Same Difference ("We R One") and Rhydian ("The Impossible Dream")
- Best Bits song: "When You Believe"

Acts' performances on the seventh live show
Act	Category (mentor)	Order	Song	Result
Alexandra Burke	Girls (Cole)	1	"Relight My Fire"	Safe
Ruth Lorenzo	Over 25s (Minogue)	2	"Love Ain't Here Anymore"	Safe
JLS	Groups (Walsh)	3	"A Million Love Songs"	Bottom Two
Rachel Hylton	Over 25s (Minogue)	4	"Rule the World"	Bottom Two
Diana Vickers	Girls (Cole)	5	"Patience"	Safe
Eoghan Quigg	Boys (Cowell)	6	"Never Forget"	Safe (Highest Votes)
Final showdown details
JLS	Groups (Walsh)	1	"Stand by Me"/"Beautiful Girls"	Saved
Rachel Hylton	Over 25s (Minogue)	2	"And I Am Telling You I'm Not Going"	Eliminated

Judges' votes to eliminate

- Walsh: Rachel Hylton – backed his own act, JLS.
- Minogue: JLS – gave no reason but effectively backed her own act, Rachel Hylton.
- Cole: Rachel Hylton – said JLS would go further in the competition though stated that it had been the best Hylton had sung since the auditions.
- Cowell: Rachel Hylton – stated that this was Hylton's third time in the bottom two and that JLS should not have been in the final showdown.

JLS had previously been rehearsing to sing "Rule the World", with the approval of their mentor, Walsh. Contrary to this, Minogue, who had higher priority in the judges' song-selection rota, selected the song for her artist Hylton to sing. This led to an on-screen argument between Minogue and Walsh.

==== Week 8: Quarter-Final (29 November) ====
- Themes: Britney Spears; American classics
- Musical guests: Miley Cyrus ("7 Things") and Britney Spears ("Womanizer")
- Best Bits song: "Don't Wanna Lose You"

Acts' performances in the quarter-final
Act	Category (mentor)	Order	First song	Order	Second song	American Artist	Result
Ruth Lorenzo	Over 25s (Minogue)	1	"I Love Rock 'n' Roll"	6	"Always"	Bon Jovi	Eliminated
JLS	Groups (Walsh)	2	"...Baby One More Time"	7	"You Light Up My Life"	Whitney Houston	Safe
Alexandra Burke	Girls (Cole)	3	"Toxic"	8	"Listen"	Beyoncé	Safe (Highest Votes)
Eoghan Quigg	Boys (Cowell)	4	"Sometimes"	9	"We're All in This Together"	The Cast of High School Musical	Safe
Diana Vickers	Girls (Cole)	5	"I'm Not a Girl, Not Yet a Woman"	10	"Everybody Hurts"	R.E.M	Safe

The quarter-final did not feature a final showdown and instead the act with the fewest public votes, Ruth Lorenzo, was automatically eliminated.

==== Week 9: Semi-Final (6 December) ====
- Themes: Mentor's choice; contestant's choice
- Musical guest: Il Divo ("Amazing Grace")
- Best bits song: "Breakaway"

Contestants' performances in the semi-final
Act	Category (mentor)	Order	First song	Order	Second song	Result
Eoghan Quigg	Boys (Cowell)	1	"Year 3000"	5	"Does Your Mother Know"	Safe
Diana Vickers	Girls (Cole)	2	"Girlfriend"	6	"White Flag"	Eliminated
Alexandra Burke	Girls (Cole)	3	"Don't Stop the Music"	7	"Un-Break My Heart"	Safe
JLS	Groups (Walsh)	4	"Umbrella"	8	"I'm Already There"	Safe (Highest Votes)

The semi-final did not feature a final showdown and instead the act with the fewest public votes, Diana Vickers, was automatically eliminated.

==== Week 10: Final (13 December) ====
- Themes: Christmas songs; celebrity duets; song of the series; winner's single
- Group performances: "I Have a Dream" (auditionees) and "Ain't No Mountain High Enough" (all contestants)
- Musical guest: Beyoncé ("If I Were a Boy")
- Best bits songs: "All or Nothing" (Eoghan Quigg), "End of the Road" (JLS) & "The Voice Within" (Alexandra Burke)

Acts' performances in the final
Act	Category (mentor)	Order	First song	Order	Second song	Duet Partner	Order	Third song	Order	Fourth song	Result
Eoghan Quigg	Boys (Cowell)	1	"I Wish It Could Be Christmas Everyday"	4	"Picture of You"	Boyzone	7	"We're All in This Together"	N/A	N/A (already eliminated)	Eliminated
JLS	Groups (Walsh)	2	"Last Christmas"	5	"Flying Without Wings"	Westlife	8	"I'm Already There"	10	"Hallelujah"	Runner-Up
Alexandra Burke	Girls (Cole)	3	"Silent Night"	6	"Listen"	Beyoncé	9	"You Are So Beautiful"	11	"Hallelujah"	Winner

== Charity single ==
The twelve contestants together recorded a cover version of Mariah Carey's 1993 hit "Hero" in support of the Help for Heroes charity. The single was available for download from 25 October 2008, after the finalists performed the song live on that night's show. It was released in stores on 27 October, and Simon Cowell predicted it "will go straight to the top of the charts". In the first week of its release it went straight to number 1 and sold 313,244 copies, more than the rest of the top ten combined.

== Reception ==
=== Ratings ===
Viewing figures for series 5 were, at the time of airing, the highest ever for any X Factor series, about 20% up on the previous series. This, however, was beaten by the sixth series the following year.

The first show of the series had the highest launch audience for any series, peaking at over 12 million viewers. The entire Auditions phase officially averaged 9.9m, a rise of 1.2m over the previous series.

The Bootcamp episodes performed well in the ratings; although the Saturday episode was beaten for the first time by Strictly Come Dancing, the Sunday episode restored the balance. The Saturday Judges' houses episode had the highest audience since the opening show, and the Sunday episode had a lower rating but still exceeded that of Strictly Come Dancing. The entire bootcamp and judges' houses phase officially averaged 9.8m, a rise of 2.5m over the previous series.

The live shows pulled in very strong audiences, often rating as the most watched programme of the week. The final was the second most watched television programme of 2008 with 14.06m viewers.

Series 5 of The X Factor officially averaged 10.5m, at the time becoming the most watched British talent series of the 21st century.

Episode	Air date	Official ITV1 rating	Weekly rank	Share
Auditions 1	16 August	10.78	1	48.2%
Auditions 2	23 August	10.10	1	45.4%
Auditions 3	30 August	8.80	2	43.5%
Auditions 4	6 September	9.57	1	42.8%
Auditions 5	13 September	9.96	1	43.2%
Auditions 6	20 September	10.01	1	41.7%
Bootcamp 1	27 September	8.94	4	36.0%
Bootcamp 2	28 September	9.47	1	38.1%
Judges' houses 1	4 October	10.84	1	40.5%
Judges' houses 2	5 October	10.11	3	42.7%
Live show 1	11 October	11.09	1	44.1%
Results 1	11 October	9.05	7	40.8%
Live show 2	18 October	10.21	3	38.5%
Results 2	18 October	9.13	9	39.7%
Live show 3	25 October	10.37	2	39.7%
Results 3	25 October	8.89	10	38.0%
Live show 4	1 November	11.65	1	43.3%
Results 4	1 November	9.72	6	37.6%
Live show 5	8 November	10.72	2	42.6%
Results 5	8 November	9.46	7	35.6%
Live show 6	15 November	11.28	1	43.5%
Results 6	15 November	10.62	2	42.9%
Live show 7	22 November	11.77	1	43.2%
Results 7	22 November	9.98	6	41.1%
Live show 8	29 November	12.67	1	46.0%
Results 8	29 November	11.41	2	50.0%
Semi-final	6 December	10.30	3	39.1%
Semi-final results	6 December	10.60	2	39.6%
Final performances	13 December	13.77	2	50.3%
Final results	13 December	14.06	1	54.4%
Series average	2008	10.51	—N/a	42.4%
