= Creative (song) =

Single by Leon Jackson

from the album Right Now
- Released: November 2008
- Recorded: 2008
- Length: 3:56
- Label: Syco
- Songwriters: Chris Porter; Howard New; Peter Gordeno
- Producer: Steve Mac

Leon Jackson singles chronology
"Don't Call This Love" (2008)	"Creative" (2008)	"Stargazing" (2009)

"Creative" is a song by Scottish singer Leon Jackson, released in November 2008 as the third single from his debut album Right Now. To promote the track, Jackson appeared on Children in Need performing the song as an "exclusive", marking the first time Jackson had performed the track. The song went on to debut at number 94 on the UK Singles Charts.

== Release and promotion ==
The song was released in November 2008 as a digital download only through Syco and Sony BMG. To promote the song, Jackson appeared on the 2008 series of Children in Need where he performed the song in live in front of a studio audience as BBC Television Centre in London. This is known to be the only time that Jackson performed the track on national television in order to promote the release of the single. The BBC said: "'Creative' is a sassy, rumba-rhythmed number where Leon soars above, hinting at his prowess in the boudoir, this is easily the most memorable original track here."

== Reception ==
Digital Spy wrote that the song “swings pretty nicely in a Bublé-esque fashion,” but that the album Right Now did not contain many other good songs.

== Music video ==
The music video for "Creative" shows Jackson performing the song in front of a big band. Jackson tries but fails to impress a female audience member.

== Chart performance ==
Chart performance for "Creative"
Chart (2008)	Peak position
United Kingdom (OCC)	94
UK Singles Downloads Chart (OCC)	88
