= Don't Call This Love =

Single by Leon Jackson

from the album Right Now
- B-side: "Don't Give Up"
- Released: 12 October 2008
- Recorded: 2008
- Genre: Pop, jazz
- Length: 4:05
- Label: Syco, Sony BMG
- Songwriters: Bryn Christopher; Chris Braide; Carl Falk
- Producer: Steve Mac

Leon Jackson singles chronology
"When You Believe" (2007)	"Don't Call This Love" (2008)	"Creative" (2008)

"Don't Call This Love" is a song by Scottish singer Leon Jackson, released on 12 October 2008 as the lead single from his debut album Right Now (2008). Written by Bryn Christopher, Chris Braide and Carl Falk, it was produced by Steve Mac and follows a year after his Christmas number one song "When You Believe" in 2007. To promote "Don't Call This Love", Jackson appeared on Series 5 of The X Factor the day prior to the official release. The song was described by the BBC as being "complete with chimes and full of force".

Commercially, the song reached number 1 on the singles charts in his native Scotland, whilst in the United Kingdom and the Republic of Ireland it reached numbers 3 and 8 respectively. It also reached number 10 on the Billboard-compiled European Hot 100 Singles chart.

== Background and release ==
After one year recording Right Now, Jackson debuted his new material. His first performance of this was on The X Factor, in which he sang "Don't Call This Love". "Don't Call This Love" was announced as the lead single from Leon Jackson’s debut album and was slated for digital download on 11 October 2008, with a physical release following shortly thereafter. Jackson also later appeared on the first show of the fifth series as the Celebrity Guest. The song was also performed on GMTV along with another track from the album, "You Don't Know Me". "Don't Call this Love" entered the United Kingdom chart at No. 3, behind Pink's "So What" and Peter Kay's "The Winners Song". In Ireland, the song debuted at No. 8.

The album Right Now was released 21 October 2008. It debuted at number 7 on the Ireland Top 75 in the week of 23 October 2008, remaining on that chart for a total of five weeks. It debuted at No. 4 on the UK Top 40 Albums chart for the week of 26 October 2008. During the following week, it was at No. 20, and the week after that No. 37. During the following week, it slipped out of the Top 40 but remained in the UK Top 75 chart for six additional weeks.

"Don't Call this Love" gave Jackson his second UK Top 5 single on the UK Singles Charts, charting at number 3 in the United Kingdom and also charting within the Irish Singles Charts Top 10. On the European Hot 100 charts, it charted at number 10, giving Jackson his second Europe Top 10 single. In Jackson's native Scotland, "Don't Call this Love" debuted at number 1 on the Scottish Singles Charts, remaining in the top position for two weeks. In total, "Don't Call this Love" spent twenty-two weeks in the Scottish Top 100 Singles charts and six weeks in the UK Top 100 Singles Charts.

== Promotion ==
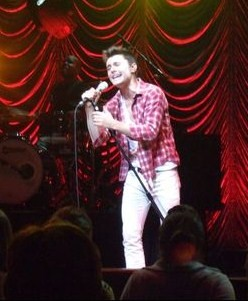
Jackson performed the track as part of his 2009 Right Now tour in 2009

On the week of release, “Don’t Call This Love” was featured in industry press as a "Single of the Week". The song was reportedly A-listed at major UK radio stations, giving it extensive airplay in the immediate pre- and post-release period. On 11 October 2008—the night before release—Jackson performed “Don’t Call This Love” live on the results show of The X Factor. The performance was billed as his "comeback" to the show that launched his career. Following this, he appeared on the national morning television programme GMTV to perform and promote the single to a broad audience.

In interviews preceding the single’s release, Jackson described “Don’t Call This Love” as his favourite track on the forthcoming album and said the song would showcase a more mature vocal style, marking a deliberate step forward from his previous work. He emphasized wanting people to see him as a serious recording artist rather than just a reality-TV winner, reflecting on the song as a statement of intent for his post-TV career. As part of the promotional campaign, Jackson returned to his native Scotland for a public signing event at the HMV store in the Almondvale Centre in Livingston — the same store where he had once worked. The in-store appearance coincided with the single’s release and was covered by regional media, drawing attention from both longtime local supporters and new fans. He expressed gratitude for the support from his Scottish fanbase, noting it was “amazing to be back on home turf.”

== Reception ==
"Don't Call this Love" received largely positive reviews from media critics following its release. Digital Spy commented, "'Don't Call this Love' is a thoroughly pleasant, classic-sounding ballad that anyone from Ronan Keating to Cliff Richard could carry off", further stating that "the luxuriant strings swell in all the right places, and Jackson's vocals are just are as smooth as they were on The X Factor, but there's a lack of character here that the glossy production can't quite disguise." Meanwhile, the BBC stated "there's really nothing going on here that isn't on your average James Morrison or Adele single, so the 'authentic music' brigade can shut up too. It's not all bad, it's not all good. He's not going to be around for a very long time, nor is he a national embarrassment".

== Music video ==
A music video for the song begins with Jackson walking through a street and watching several girls before appearing on a stage in a bar where he performs the song. Throughout the video, Jackson interacts with various girls, with one portrayed as his primary love interest.

== Track listing ==
UK CD Single
No.	Title	Length
1.	"Don't Call This Love"	4:11
2.	"Don't Give Up"	3:51

== Charts ==
=== Weekly charts ===
Chart (2008)	Peak position
European Hot 100 Singles (Billboard)	10
Ireland (IRMA)	8
Scotland Singles (OCC)	1
UK Singles (OCC)	3
UK Singles Downloads (OCC)	4
UK Physical Singles Chart (OCC)	2

=== Year-end charts ===
Chart (2008)	Position
UK Singles (OCC)	143
