= Vince Kidd =

- Also known as: billy blond
- Born: Matthew Protheroe; 31 December 1989 (age 36)
- Origin: London
- Genres: Soul, jazz, R&B, pop, grime, hip hop
- Occupations: Singer, songwriter
- Years active: 2007–present
- Label: Island Records

Matthew Protheroe (born 31 December 1989), known professionally as Vince Kidd, is an English singer who was a finalist on the first series of The Voice UK. In 2018, he began releasing music under the name billy blond.

Appearing on the second of four audition shows, Kidd auditioned with "Like a Virgin", originally by Madonna—with all four coaches electing for him to join their teams, from which Kidd selected Jessie J. During the battle rounds, Kidd sang "We Found Love" by Calvin Harris & Rihanna against seventeen-year-old Jessica Hammond—with Jessie crowning him the winner. In the second live show, Kidd performed Elvis Presley's rendition of "Always on My Mind"—proceeding to the next round on account of the public vote. In the fourth live show, Kidd performed Whitney Houston's "My Love Is Your Love"—proceeding once again to the next round on account of the public vote. In the semi-finals, Kidd performed "Back to Black" by Amy Winehouse—advancing to the final. In the final of The Voice UK, Kidd performed both "Many Rivers to Cross" and "Nobody's Perfect"—the latter alongside coach Jessie J—ultimately finishing in fourth place.

Following The Voice UK, an eight-track compilation was released in June 2012 featuring Kidd's renditions of "Like a Virgin" and "Always On My Mind", entering the UK chart at #97 and #134, respectively. Kidd released his debut extended play, Sick Love, in the United Kingdom on 4 November 2012, which peaked at #198 on the UK chart.

A music video for his second EP, The Zoo, featuring The Saturdays' Vanessa White, was uploaded to YouTube on 20 April 2013. The EP was released on 2 June 2012.

"You And Me" was released as a single on iTunes on 7 June 2013. "My Gang" was released as a single on 11 September 2013. In May 2014, Kidd lent his vocals to Alpines song "Zero", featured on their debut album. He also co-wrote the song.

He featured on the Hollaphonic song "Dangerous", released on 9 February 2015. The song reached #1 in Qatar.

A song he co-wrote, "What Would Dusty Do?", was recorded by X Factor 2014 finalist Andrea Faustini and released on his debut album on 17 July 2015.

== Discography ==
=== Singles ===
==== As lead artist ====
Title	Year	Peak chart positions
Title	Year	UK
"Sick Love" (featuring Lady Leshurr)	2012	198
"The Zoo" (featuring Shystie or Vanessa White)	2013	—
"You & Me" (featuring Kelz TBK)	2013	—
"Almost Angels"	2016	—

==== As featured artist ====
Title	Year	Album
"Sick Love" (Lady Leshurr Feat. Vince Kidd)	2012	Sick Love EP
"This Girl" (Kelz TBK)	2013	The Black Kupid 2: Mixtape
"Zero" (Alpines)	2014	Oasis
"Dangerous" (Hollaphonic Feat. Vince Kidd)	2015	Personal Space
"Crystalized" (Diego Miranda Feat. Vince Kidd)	2016	Crystalized
"Self Control" (Calper and Vince Kidd)	2016	Self Control

=== Guest appearances ===
Song	Year	Album
"Like A Virgin"	2012	The Voice UK, The Final 8 – The Album
"Always On My Mind"	2012	The Voice UK, The Final 8 – The Album
