= When You Believe =

Song from the 1998 film The Prince of Egypt

Single by Mariah Carey and Whitney Houston

from the album The Prince of Egypt, My Love Is Your Love, and #1's
- B-side: "I Am Free"; "You Were Loved"
- Released: October 28, 1998
- Recorded: August 14, 1998
- Studio: Brandon's Way Recording Studios (Los Angeles); Conway Recording Studios (Los Angeles); Ocean Way Recording (Hollywood, California); Right Track Recording (New York City); The Hit Factory (New York City)
- Genre: Pop; R&B; soul; gospel
- Length: 4:35; 5:01 (soundtrack version)
- Label: DreamWorks; Arista; Columbia
- Songwriters: Stephen Schwartz; Kenneth "Babyface" Edmonds
- Producer: Babyface

Mariah Carey singles chronology
| "Sweetheart" (1998) | "When You Believe" (1998) | "I Still Believe" (1999) |

Whitney Houston singles chronology
| "My Heart Is Calling" (1997) | "When You Believe" (1998) | "Heartbreak Hotel" (1998) |

Music video
- "When You Believe" on YouTube

"When You Believe" is a song made for the 1998 DreamWorks musical animated feature The Prince of Egypt, with music and lyrics by Stephen Schwartz. A pop single version of "When You Believe" performed by American singers Whitney Houston and Mariah Carey, with additional music and lyrics by writer-producer Kenneth "Babyface" Edmonds, was also recorded for the film's end credits and its soundtrack album by DreamWorks Records. Additionally, the song was released as a single on October 28, 1998, serving as the lead single for the soundtrack and for both Houston's fourth studio album, My Love Is Your Love by Arista Records, and the second single and first commercial single for Carey's first compilation album, #1's by Columbia Records. The original version of the song, featured in the narrative portion of the film, is performed by Sally Dworsky, Michelle Pfeiffer, and a children's choir featuring soloist Andrew Bryan. "When You Believe" is described as a big ballad, with meaningful and inspirational lyrics, describing that there can be miracles when a person believes in God.

The song received mixed reviews from music critics and experienced moderate success, peaking at number 15 on the Billboard Hot 100, despite heavy media attention and live promotion. It achieved better charting throughout Europe and other nations, reaching number one in Hungary, peaking within the top five in Belgium, France, Iceland, Italy, the Netherlands, Norway, Spain, Sweden, Switzerland and the United Kingdom. "When You Believe" was awarded the Academy Award for Best Original Song at the 71st annual ceremony on March 21, 1999. Prior to their performance of the song that night, Schwartz left Babyface's name off the nomination submission sheet. He felt that because the additions Babyface added to the song were not featured in the actual film version, he did not deserve writing credits. However, while Babyface did not receive the Oscar, Carey and Houston performed his version of the song, because they were more familiar with it than the one in the film. Prior to their performance at the Academy Awards, they sang it on November 26, 1998, on The Oprah Winfrey Show, promoting the song, as well as both their albums.

The song featured two music videos. The first and most commonly seen video was filmed at Brooklyn Academy of Music performing arts center. The video features both singers, and begins with Houston and Carey performing in a large auditorium, giving the illusion of a concert. Towards the end of the video, clips of the film are projected onto a large screen at the concert, while they belt out the final verse. The alternate video was only released on NBC's special, When You Believe: Music Inspired by the Prince of Egypt, broadcast on December 13, 1998. It features a similar synopsis, with both singers performing on a large stage of an old Egyptian pyramid.

== Background and recording ==
It's sort of a message song. It's what Prince of Egypt is about, Moses. If we were ever going to come together on any kind of record, this is definitely the right one, and really the coolest thing to me is that after all of the drama and everybody making it like we had a rivalry, she was just really cool and we had a really good time in the studio. We had fun. And so, if nothing else, it was a good experience... and diva-ism, whatever.

— Carey, on working with Houston in the studio, during an interview with Vibe.

When Carey compiled her first compilation effort, #1's, "When You Believe" was included in the track listing. According to Carey, the song was included because she felt it was "a miracle" that she and Houston collaborated on a record. During the development of All That Glitters (a film Carey was working on at the time, later known as Glitter), she had been introduced to DreamWorks co-owner Jeffrey Katzenberg, who asked her if she would record the song "When You Believe" for the soundtrack of the animated film The Prince of Egypt. Houston, on the other hand, was introduced to the project through Kenneth "Babyface" Edmonds, with whom she had been collaborating on her album, My Love Is Your Love. After they were shown the film separately, both became very enthusiastic about participating in the project.

The song was co-written by Stephen Schwartz and Kenneth "Babyface" Edmonds, who also produced the song. Edmonds expressed how he went through more than one version of the song and described its production as a beautiful film ballad that was something different from anything he, Carey, or Houston had ever previously recorded. In an interview with Vibe, Carey said that she "liked [the song] the way it was". She had characterised it as "a very big ballad but in an inspirational way" and denied speculation that there had been past rivalry or animosity between her and Houston prior to its recording: "I never even really talked to her until this. We never had any issues between us. The media and everybody made it an issue". In an interview with Ebony, Houston spoke about her relationship with Carey:

I enjoyed working with her very much. Mariah and I got along very great. We had never talked and never sang together before. We just had a chance for camaraderie, singer-to-singer, artist-to-artist, that kind of thing. We just laughed and talked and laughed and talked and sang in between that ... It's good to know that two ladies of soul can still be friends. We talked about doing other things together, enterprise-wise, which is cool, because she's got a good, vivid mind, that girl. She's a smart lady. I really like Mariah.

Babyface confirmed that Carey and Houston recorded their parts separately. He recalled that both singers had requested him as producer, as neither trusted the other's regular producer at the time: Walter Afanasieff, who frequently worked with Carey, and David Foster, who worked with Houston. He also described competing interests between Carey’s label head, Tommy Mottola, and Houston’s label head, Clive Davis, as well as differing preferences expressed by the singers themselves. Describing himself as a neutral party, Babyface said that his involvement helped both singers feel comfortable with the collaboration. Although the pair continued to express positive feelings for one another, the media continued to perpetuate the rivalry narrative. It was alleged that the singers had to record their parts separately due to tension. While media speculation grew as the film's release date drew near, both singers maintained that they had become close friends, and had only the most positive things to say about each other.

== Lyrical content ==
The Prince of Egypt is a film adaptation of the first fourteen chapters of the Book of Exodus. "When You Believe" is sung in the film mainly by Miriam and Tzipporah, in an attempt to reassure Moses in the aftermath of the tenth plague and to make sense of and rejoice in their newfound freedom. They recall the tough times that have caused them to question their faith; they have prayed many nights to God, but those pleas seemed to have remain unanswered. Nevertheless, they realize that although the times may be difficult, their faith should remain strong. The scene is overlaid with Hebrews emerging from their homes after the plagues, being free for the first time. The song is then sung by a chorus of Hebrews as they depart from Egypt and embark on the Exodus, eventually ending up at the Red Sea coast prior to its parting. As a bridge, a chorus of children sings some paraphrased excerpts in Hebrew from the Song of the Sea (Exodus 15:1-18).

The original draft of the song used the lyric "you can do miracles when you believe", but this seemed to imply that the believer, not God, was responsible for performing miracles; the lyric was later changed to "there can be miracles when you believe".

Houston had sung in a church choir while growing up, and Carey had always connected to her faith through music, especially during any difficult times. This song became one of the many reasons that both singers were so interested in the project. They each felt that spreading faith in God was an important and honorable aspect of their career. While describing the song's lyrics and message, Houston said in an interview with Ebony:

A powerful ballad; [songwriter] Stephen Schwartz is a genius. You have to be a child of God to understand the depth of this song. Mariah and I did it as we felt it. We both felt very connected to the song because of our background. What can I say? (It is) Just a beautiful song. What a lyric! I can't talk about it—just listen to it.

== Composition ==
'When You Believe'
A 28-second sample of the song, featuring the gospel-inspired background vocals and last bridge.

Originally, Schwartz composed the film version of "When You Believe", which was sung in the film by the characters of Tzipporah (Michelle Pfeiffer) and Miriam (Sally Dworsky). It featured some different instrumentation from the single version, and a bridge in which a children’s choir sang in Hebrew from the Song of the Sea in the Book of Exodus.

In order to give the song a wider radio and pop appeal, Edmonds changed some of the song's instrumentals and replaced the children’s choir and the original bridge with a gospel one. His version was considered more "commercial" and would make the song "help sell the movie". Schwartz's original version was titled "When You Believe", while Edmonds' enhanced version was titled "The Prince of Egypt (When You Believe)". "When You Believe" is a slow tempo ballad, which incorporates pop, soul and R&B genres. A key change separates Houston and Carey's solo parts in the song. During the last bridge and chorus, gospel inspired background singers join the song, giving it a "layered sound" while Houston and Carey's voice switch off belting the bridge. After "When You Believe" was written, Babyface added additional instrumentation, as well as a final bridge. Babyface credited the song's final vocal arrangements with highlighting the differences between Carey's and Houston's vocal styles, which he felt had previously been conflated in public and media comparisons, with Carey sometimes characterized as a copy of Houston.

Musicological commentary has noted that the opening melodic line of When You Believe bears a resemblance of the Chinese orchestral piece Dance of the Yao People (瑶族舞曲), composed by Liu Tieshan and Mao Yuan in 1952. Dance of the Yao People is a well-known instrumental work based on the traditional long-drum dance music of the Yao ethnic group, characterized by its distinctive pentatonic-influenced melodies and orchestral presentation.

The song is set in common time. Houston's verse is written in the key of B minor and features a basic chord progression of A-G_{1}, and the song modulates to D major for her chorus. Her vocals in the song range from the note of F♯_{3} to F♯_{5}. Carey's verse is set in the same key, but the song changes to E major for her chorus. Her vocal range in the song spans from the low note of E_{3} to the high note of A♯_{5} The song's key changes again in the last chorus, to F-sharp major. Steve Jones from USA Today called the song a "soaring duet" and felt that the song would be able to appeal to many types of listeners and "cross all genres".

== Critical reception ==
"When You Believe" received generally mixed reviews from music critics, who favorably described the track as "epic", "powerful", "beautiful", "stunning", "bombastic", and "a devout duet". Chuck Taylor of Billboard wrote: "The Babyface-stamped track is indeed lovely, offering an instantly accessible chorus and a squeaky clean message of "all things are possible when you believe in your dreams". He added that "the genuine story in this track is the return of Houston, who sounds fantastic—as clear and confident as ever". Another editor, Paul Verna stated that it is a "high-powered" duet, and later highlighted the song while reviewing Houston's album.

However, some reviewers were not as enthusiastic. Stephen Thomas Erlewine of AllMusic called it "unexpected -- and unexpectedly dull", while David Browne complained it has "so much sap, maple trees will be jealous", particularly dismissing the song's religious aspect as "insipid" and its inspirational message forced and generic. Two decades later, the song was ranked the 96th best Carey song by Billboard, the second-best pop song of the 1990s by Elle, one of the four best R&B duets of all time by CBC.ca, and the 42nd best track of any genre of the decade by Insider.

== Chart performance ==
The song performed moderately in the United States, despite a performance on The Oprah Winfrey Show and the 71st annual Academy Awards. After debuting at number 50 on the Billboard Hot 100 on radio airplay alone, "When You Believe" peaked at number fifteen, surprising many who thought the song would be a bigger hit. Its modest peak at 33 on the Hot R&B Singles & Tracks chart was the lowest peak to date for both artists at the time. It ultimately peaked at number 15 on the Hot 100 and number three on Billboard's Adult Contemporary Chart. On March 24, 1999, after fluctuating in the US charts, the song was certified platinum by the Recording Industry Association of America (RIAA), denoting shipments of over 1,000,000 units. In Canada, the song debuted on the RPM Singles Chart at number 66 on the RPM issue dated December 7, 1998, and peaked at number 20 on the chart issue dated January 25, 1999. It was present on the chart for a total of ten weeks.

The song performed moderately in Australia, where it entered at number 25 on the ARIA Singles Chart during the week of December 6, 1998. It remained on the chart for 14 weeks, spending its last week on the chart at number 50; it was certified gold by the Australian Recording Industry Association (ARIA), denoting shipments of over 35,000 units. In New Zealand, it peaked at number eight on the singles chart, and spent nine weeks fluctuating in the singles chart. "When You Believe" experienced its highest charting in Europe. In Belgium, it reached number five on the Flanders Ultratop 50, and peaked at number four and spent 20 weeks on the Wallonian Ultratop 40. During the week of December 5, 1998, "When You Believe" entered the Dutch Top 40 at number fifty-four. The song spent twenty-one weeks on the singles chart and was peaked at number four. Due to strong single sales, the song entered the Finnish Singles Chart at number 10, but it only spent one week in the chart. In France, the song entered the French Singles Chart at number 14 on December 5, 1998 and eventually peaked at number five. After spending 20 weeks fluctuating in the singles chart, it was certified silver by the Syndicat National de l'Édition Phonographique (SNEP). In Germany, it peaked at number eight on the German Singles Chart and was certified gold by the Bundesverband Musikindustrie, denoting shipments of over 250,000 units. The song peaked at number seven in Ireland, where it spent 11 weeks in the Irish Singles Chart.

In Norway, "When You Believe" entered at number three on the VG-lista chart and peaked at number two, spending three consecutive weeks at the position. It was certified platinum by the International Federation of the Phonographic Industry (IFPI) and spent 15 weeks on the chart. The song peaked at number two in Sweden and Switzerland, spending 20 and 24 weeks on the singles charts, respectively. The IFPI certified the song platinum in Sweden and gold in Switzerland. "When You Believe" experienced high charting in the United Kingdom. It peaked at number four on the UK Singles Chart during the week of December 19, 1998 and spent 14 weeks on the chart. As of 2010, sales of the song in the UK are estimated at 260,000 units.

== Music videos ==
The single's music video was filmed at the Brooklyn Academy of Music during the fall of 1998. The video begins with Houston entering a small arena as she begins to sing the song's first verse. As she finishes her part, Carey appears on the stage as well, performing the second verse and chorus. The video is set in a dark studio accented by Egyptian settings, backdrops, and scenes inspired by The Prince of Egypt. An audience is on hand to emulate a concert-like-setting, cheering on both singers. Occasionally, home video clips of Carey and Houston appear throughout the video, as well as clips of the final moments of the film, during the splitting of the Red Sea. The video ends as the room is illuminated, and the two singers are joined by a large choir. As they complete the song, Carey and Houston receive a standing ovation from the crowd, and exit the studio together, walking side by side as they disappear in the distance. For the video, Carey and Houston both donned similar low-cut black gowns, while Carey sported a long straight hairstyle, and Houston a pixie cut.

The song's alternate video features a similar synopsis, where Houston begins singing the song on a large stone altar in the middle of an auditorium. As she finishes her verse, Carey is seen walking up the ramp in the background, joining Houston for her verse. They continue singing the song together, standing side by side and holding hands. After completing the song, both singers exit the auditorium together as in the first video, simulating two friends enjoying time with each other. Both videos are very similar, only the alternate version does not feature an audience, choir or images, only the duo singing together atop the stone altar.

== Live performances ==
The duo performed the song live on The Oprah Winfrey Show on November 26, 1998. Aside from the joint performance, Houston and Carey sang their own singles at the time, "I Learned from the Best" and "I Still Believe", respectively. Additionally, they sang the song live at the 71st Annual Academy Awards on March 21, 1999. Before the performance, they were due to rehearse together a few days before their scheduled appearance. Houston however, called in sick and had to miss the rehearsal. Reportedly, her excuse was not taken well, as academy executives were not convinced by that story. Conti, the academy's musical arranger, found a young female singer to take Houston's place, Janis Uhley. Before the performance, Carey walked down the stage in a white top and jeans, while choreographer Debbie Allen led the background singers. As they began the performance, Carey forgot the lyrics and stopped, as Uhley began singing in a "theatricality and gusto". Her boastful performance was not taken well by the directors, who called it "inappropriate and unnerving". After she was removed from the stage, a new date was chosen for the rehearsal, one that would accommodate both Houston and Carey.

The next night, after they began the rehearsal, both singers had trouble performing the film version of the song. After hours of practice and confusion, they reached a compromise; they would sing a mash-up of the film and single versions, which featured an additional bridge and instrumentation by Edmonds. For the Oscar ceremony, Houston and Carey wore matching white gowns, symbolizing "humbleness and simplicity". Houston entered the arena, performing her verse, followed by Carey. As the song's finale drew near, a full gospel choir joined the performance from large suspending golden scaffolding, all wearing large white tunics. After the original was nominated for the Academy Award, Schwartz refused to give Edmonds writing credits in nomination forms submitted to the academy.

In 2016, Carey performed the song on her Sweet Sweet Fantasy Tour solo as Houston had died four years prior to the tour.

== Awards and nominations ==
Awards
| Year | Ceremony | Category | Result | Ref. |
|---|---|---|---|---|
| 1999 | 71st Academy Awards | Academy Award for Best Song | Won | |
| 1999 | 4th Critics' Choice Awards | Broadcast Film Critics Association Award for Best Song | Won | |
| 1999 | 1998 Golden Globes | Best Original Song (in a Motion Picture) | Nominated | |
| 2000 | 42nd Grammy Awards | Best Song Written Specifically for a Motion Picture or Television | Nominated | |
| 2000 | 42nd Grammy Awards | Best Pop Collaboration with Vocals | Nominated | |

== Track listings and formats ==
- European CD single
1. "When You Believe" (album version) – 4:35
2. "When You Believe" (TV track) – 4:35
- U.S. CD single
1. "When You Believe" (album version) – 4:38
2. "When You Believe" (instrumental) – 4:30
- European CD maxi-single
1. "When You Believe (album version)" – 4:35
2. "I Am Free" – 3:08
3. "You Were Loved" – 4:09
- Japanese CD maxi-single
1. When You Believe" (album version) – 4:35
2. "When You Believe" (TV track) – 4:32
3. "I Am Free" – 3:08
4. "You Were Loved" – 4:11
- U.K. CD maxi-single
1. "When You Believe" (album version) – 4:35
2. "Sweetheart" (The M!'s Pounding Vocal) – 9:43
3. "You Were Loved" – 4:09

== Charts ==
=== Weekly charts ===
1998–1999 weekly chart performance for "When You Believe"
| Chart (1998–1999) | Peak position |
|---|---|
| Australia (ARIA) | 13 |
| Austria (Ö3 Austria Top 40) | 6 |
| Belgium (Ultratop 50 Flanders) | 5 |
| Belgium (Ultratop 50 Wallonia) | 4 |
| Canada (Nielsen SoundScan) | 26 |
| Canada Top Singles (RPM) | 20 |
| Canada Adult Contemporary (RPM) | 8 |
| Denmark (IFPI) | 7 |
| Europe (European Hot 100 Singles) | 2 |
| Finland (Suomen virallinen lista) | 10 |
| France (SNEP) | 5 |
| Germany (GfK) | 8 |
| Greece (IFPI) | 2 |
| Hungary (MAHASZ) | 1 |
| Iceland (Íslenski Listinn Topp 40) | 2 |
| Ireland (IRMA) | 7 |
| Italy (FIMI) | 4 |
| Japan (Oricon) | 45 |
| Latvia (Latvijas Top 197) | 2 |
| Netherlands (Dutch Top 40) | 5 |
| Netherlands (Single Top 100) | 4 |
| New Zealand (Recorded Music NZ) | 8 |
| Norway (VG-lista) | 2 |
| Quebec (ADISQ) | 11 |
| Scottish Singles Sales (Official Charts) | 6 |
| Spain (PROMUSICAE) | 2 |
| Sweden (Sverigetopplistan) | 2 |
| Switzerland (Schweizer Hitparade) | 2 |
| UK Singles (Official Charts) | 4 |
| UK Airplay (Music Control) | 32 |
| US Billboard Hot 100 | 15 |
| US Adult Contemporary (Billboard) | 3 |
| US Adult Pop Airplay (Billboard) | 37 |
| US Crossover (Billboard) | 40 |
| US Hot R&B/Hip-Hop Songs (Billboard) | 33 |
| US Pop Airplay (Billboard) | 35 |
| US Rhythmic Airplay (Billboard) | 35 |
| US Adult Contemporary (Radio & Records) | 4 |
| US CHR/Pop (Radio & Records) | 28 |
| US CHR/Rhythmic (Radio & Records) | 31 |
| US Hot AC (Radio & Records) | 29 |
| US Urban (Radio & Records) | 21 |
| US Urban AC (Radio & Records) | 4 |

2007–2013 weekly chart performance for "When You Believe"
| Chart (2007–2013) | Peak position |
|---|---|
| France (SNEP) | 90 |
| South Korea International (Circle) | 94 |
| UK Singles (OCC) | 65 |
| US Gospel Digital Songs (Billboard) | 2 |
| US Gospel Streaming Songs (Billboard) | 5 |

=== Year-end charts ===
1998 year-end chart performance for "When You Believe"
| Chart (1998) | Position |
|---|---|
| Australia (ARIA) | 79 |
| Belgium (Ultratop 50 Flanders) | 70 |
| Belgium (Ultratop 50 Wallonia) | 57 |
| Canada Adult Contemporary (RPM) | 89 |
| France (SNEP) | 86 |
| Netherlands (Dutch Top 40) | 151 |
| Sweden (Hitlistan) | 42 |
| UK Singles (OCC) | 110 |
| US Adult Contemporary (Radio & Records) | 68 |

1999 year-end chart performance for "When You Believe"
| Chart (1999) | Position |
|---|---|
| Austria (Ö3 Austria Top 40) | 33 |
| Belgium (Ultratop 50 Flanders) | 58 |
| Belgium (Ultratop 50 Wallonia) | 58 |
| Canada Adult Contemporary (RPM) | 60 |
| Europe (European Hot 100 Singles) | 9 |
| France (SNEP) | 64 |
| Germany (Media Control) | 37 |
| Italy (Musica e dischi) | 36 |
| Netherlands (Dutch Top 40) | 50 |
| Netherlands (Single Top 100) | 34 |
| Romania (Romanian Top 100) | 42 |
| Sweden (Hitlistan) | 32 |
| Switzerland (Schweizer Hitparade) | 6 |
| US Billboard Hot 100 | 99 |
| US Adult Contemporary (Billboard) | 19 |
| US Hot R&B/Hip-Hop Singles Sales (Billboard) | 69 |
| US Adult Contemporary (Radio & Records) | 14 |
| US Urban AC (Radio & Records) | 57 |

== Certifications ==
| Region | Certification | Certified units/sales |
|---|---|---|
| Australia (ARIA) | Gold | 35,000^{^} |
| Belgium (BRMA) | Platinum | 50,000^{*} |
| France (SNEP) | Gold | 250,000^{*} |
| Germany (BVMI) | Gold | 250,000^{^} |
| New Zealand (RMNZ) | Gold | 15,000^{‡} |
| Norway (IFPI Norway) | Platinum | |
| Sweden (GLF) | Platinum | 30,000^{^} |
| Switzerland (IFPI Switzerland) | Gold | 25,000^{^} |
| United Kingdom (BPI) | Platinum | 600,000^{‡} |
| United States (RIAA) | Platinum | 1,000,000^{‡} |
| United States (RIAA) Physical single | Gold | 500,000^{^} |
^{*} Sales figures based on certification alone.^{^} Shipments figures based on certification alone.^{‡} Sales+streaming figures based on certification alone.

== Release history ==
Release dates and formats
| Region | Date | Format | Ref. |
|---|---|---|---|
| United States | October 28, 1998 | Contemporary hit radio; urban radio; rhythmic contemporary radio | |
| Japan | November 26, 1998 | CD | |
| Belgium | November 30, 1998 | Maxi CD | |
| Malaysia | December 3, 1998 | — | |
| United Kingdom | December 7, 1998 | Cassette; CD | |
| United States | January 5, 1999 | CD | |

== Cover versions ==
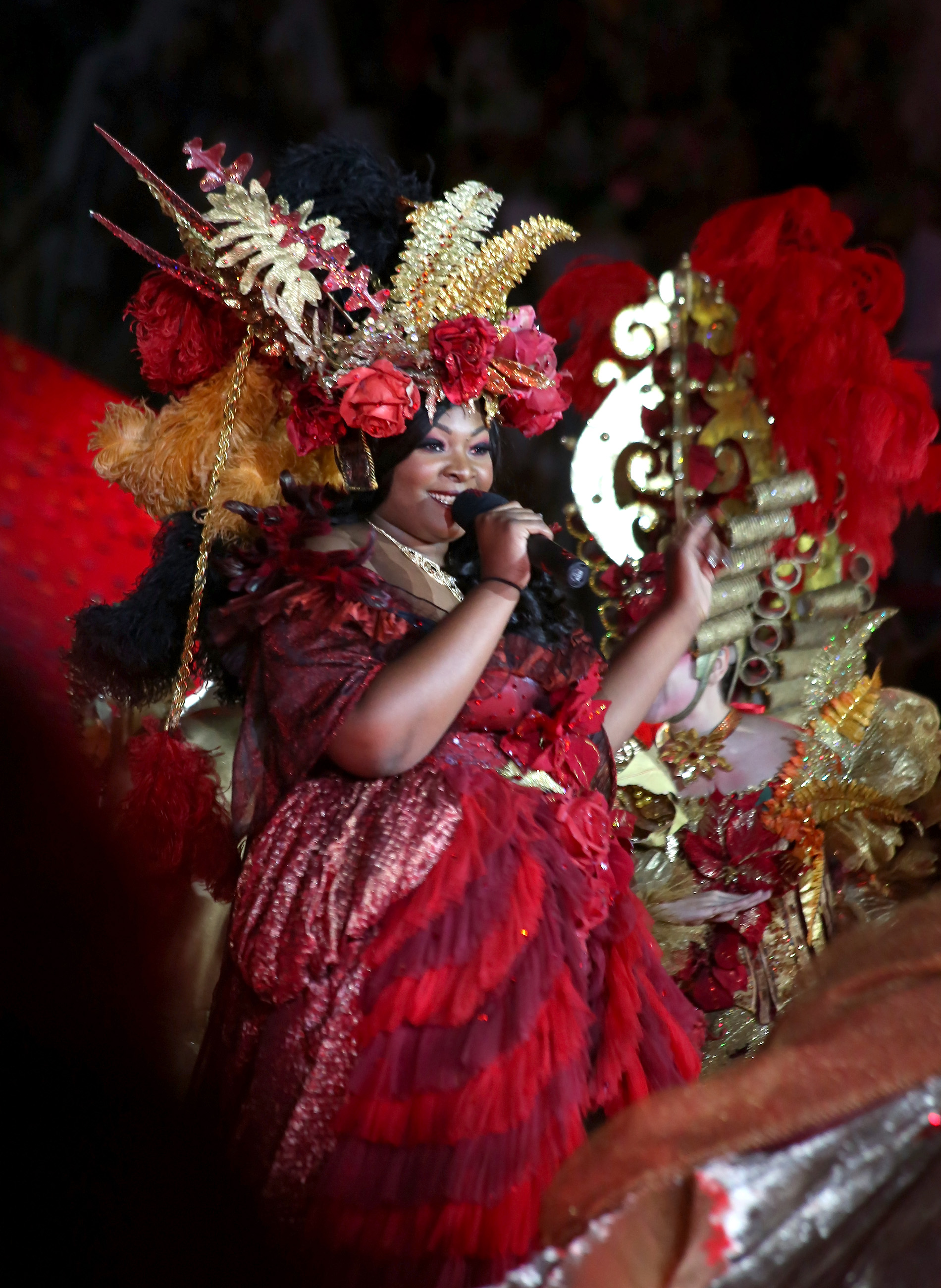
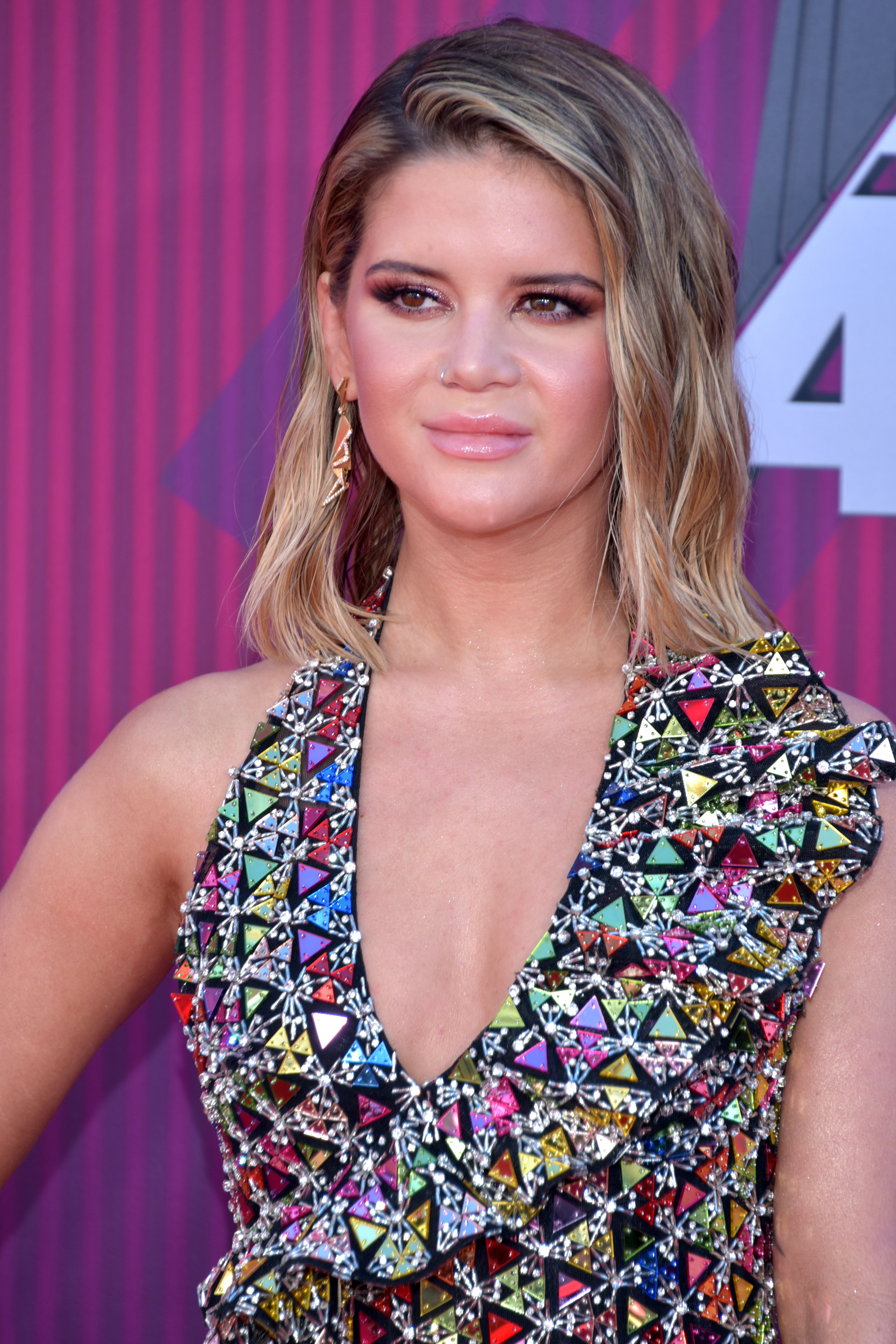
The song has been covered by multiple artists; American Idol winner Candice Glover (left) and American singer Maren Morris (right) have both covered the song.

"When You Believe" was performed by American Idol contestant and winner Candice Glover on the twelfth season of the show. A studio recording of the song was also released as a single on iTunes. Glover performed "When You Believe" on American Idol on the "Divas" theme night on April 17, 2013. Glover's performance was met with praise from the show's judges and was generally considered the best performance of the night. Rolling Stone wrote that Glover "got judges on their feet" with her "impeccable" performance. Nicki Minaj exclaimed at the end of the performance that "and that is how you do a Mariah Carey/Whitney Houston song". Likewise, Billboard called Glover's performance "best single showing of the night" and commented on the vocal delivery that "she knows precisely when to hit the sweet spot of a song, building up to that point with masterful restraint". MTV News commented that Glover "positively slay[ed]" the song.

The song was recorded by Irish musical ensemble Celtic Woman and released as a single from their fifth studio album Celtic Woman: Songs from the Heart (2010). The song also appears on the Japanese release of their seventh studio album Celtic Woman: Believe (2011). The song features lead vocals from one of the group's singers Chloë Agnew. In an interview for Chicago Music Magazine, Chloë Agnew described the lyrics of the song as "really incredible". She stated that "it is a songs that I listen to and wish I had written. It's really so special. I think a lot of people have found strength and hope in the lyrics. It's been really rewarding to meet and talk to people at our meet and greet events come up and tell me how much that song means to them and how it has helped them". Irish singer Chloë Agnew recorded the track for her debut album Chloë (2002).

In 2011, the first season winner of The X Factor, Melanie Amaro covered this song during the live performance. In 2014, the song was performed live by Teodora Sava when she was 13 years old, in duet with Nico, as special guests of the Romanian kids talent show Next Star. Pentatonix and Maren Morris covered the song for Pentatonix's 2018 Christmas album Christmas Is Here!. Their cover is also featured on The Best of Pentatonix Christmas.

American Belz Hasidic singer Shulem Lemmer covered the song, in his album The Perfect Dream, released in 2019. Cynthia Erivo and Shoshana Bean, with piano accompaniment by Stephen Schwartz, performed the song as part of the Saturday Night Seder on April 11, 2020. This version was then released as a single on June 30 the same year. Erivo would go on to perform the song with her Wicked co-star Ariana Grande at the 2024 Met Gala and by herself at the 35th National Memorial Day Concert in Washington, D.C., both in May 2024. Swede Isak Danielson, released a version as a single in November 2020.

== Leon Jackson version ==
"When You Believe"

Single by Leon Jackson

from the album Right Now
- Released: December 16, 2007
- Recorded: 2007
- Genre: Pop
- Length: 4:16
- Label: Syco
- Songwriters: Stephen Schwartz; Kenneth "Babyface" Edmonds
- Producer: Steve Mac

Leon Jackson singles chronology
| "When You Believe" (2007) | "Don't Call This Love" (2008) |

The X Factor winner's single singles chronology
| "A Moment Like This" (2006) | "When You Believe" (2007) | "Hallelujah" (2008) |

"When You Believe" was recorded by The X Factor winner Leon Jackson in December 2007, with slightly altered lyrics in the second verse, removing some religious overtones within the song. The single was available to download from midnight after the result of the show on December 15, and a CD was rush-released mid-week, on December 19. This was unusual as most new singles were released on a Monday to gain maximum sales for the UK Singles Chart the following Sunday. Exceptions included the previous two X Factor winners whose singles were released in this fashion, in order for them to compete to be the Christmas number-one single, which they all became. A video for the single was made by each of the final four of the series; Jackson, Rhydian Roberts, Same Difference, and Niki Evans. However, rather unsurprisingly, only the winner's version of the song and video was released.

The song ended 2007 as the year's fourth biggest-selling single in the UK and remained number one into 2008, but it only managed to stay in the top 40 for seven weeks, despite being atop the chart for three weeks. It also soon disappeared from the top 100, and was gone by late February.

=== Music video ===
The music video, like previous X Factor winners singles, is very simple, with Jackson singing the song in front of a large projection, with swooping shots of various landscapes behind him. It also features several clips from his time in The X Factor, from his first audition to the moment he was announced the winner and performed his single to close the series. Simon Cowell, Sharon Osbourne, Dannii Minogue, Louis Walsh, Dermot O'Leary and runner-up Rhydian Roberts all feature within the clips.

=== Chart performance ===
On December 23, 2007, it debuted at number one on the UK Singles Chart, making it the coveted Christmas number one with sales of over 275,000 copies. It stayed at number one for three weeks until it fell down to number five on its fourth week and then fell another ten places to number fifteen in its fifth week. According to The Official Charts Company, the song has sold 506,000 copies in the UK as of December 2012. Additionally, it also spent three weeks at the top of the Irish Singles Chart.

=== Charts and certifications ===
==== Weekly charts ====
| Chart (2007–2008) | Peak position |
|---|---|
| Europe (European Hot 100 Singles) | 4 |
| Ireland (IRMA) | 1 |
| Scottish Singles Sales (Official Charts) | 1 |
| UK Singles (Official Charts) | 1 |

==== Year-end charts ====
| Chart (2007) | Position |
|---|---|
| Ireland (IRMA) | 12 |
| UK Singles (Official Charts Company) | 4 |

==== Certifications ====
Certifications for When You Believe
| Region | Certification | Certified units/sales |
|---|---|---|
| United Kingdom (BPI) | Gold | 506,000 |

== See also ==
- List of UK Singles Chart number ones of the 2000s
- List of number-one singles of 2007 (Ireland)
