= Howard New =

English singer-songwriter

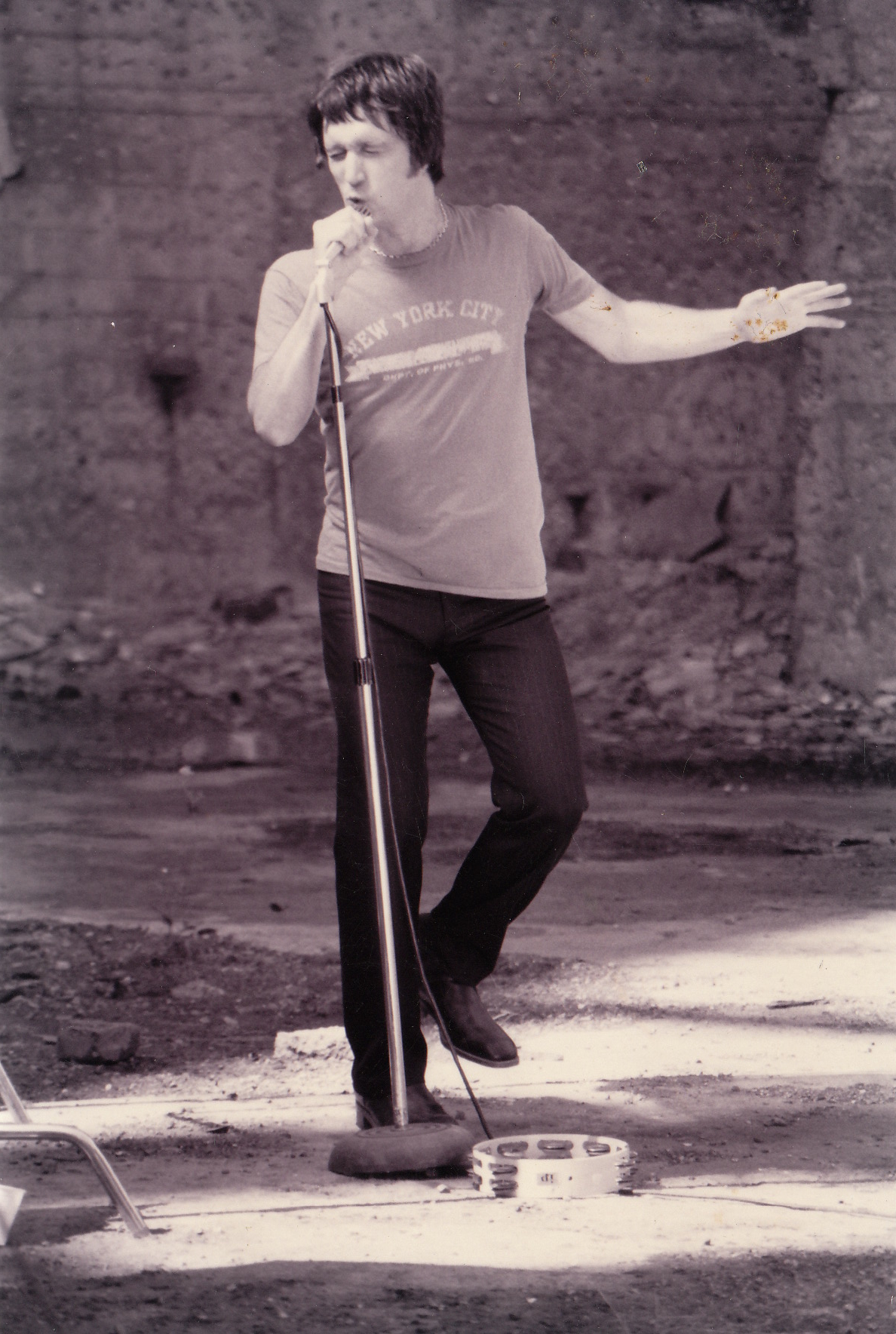
Howard New performing Battlefield

Howard David New (1966 – 3 September 2009) was an English singer-songwriter mainly of the blues and soul genres. He was one of the first songwriters to sign for the independent publisher Kobalt Music.

== Career ==
New's music career started in Warrington in the early 1980s with a group called "Macabre Day".

He later won the UK's battle of the bands competition in 1993 when he was the frontman and writer for rock band JORDAN. The band quickly gained a strong following and were known for their live performances. Playing at venues across the North West and a few notable stints at the famous Orange venue in Knightsbridge - the band played live at Parr Hall in Warrington which claimed them the battle of the bands winners. The band then travelled to Tokyo to perform in the worldwide even and came second. Subsequently Howard then got signed.

As time went on New had worked with many different well-known artists such as Beverley Knight, Louise Redknapp, Lucie Silvas, Rachel Stevens (formally of S Club fame), Robert Plant of Led Zeppelin, Mikey Graham from Boyzone and Gary Barlow from Take That.

Jools Holland once commented that with his own piano skills and New's voice, they could be Ray Charles

He was killed in a car crash aged 42 near his home in Manchester. His wife was called Jane and he had a daughter named Scarlett. His parents Brian and Ellen New survived him as did his two sisters Angela and Carol as well as brother Brian Jnr. His funeral took place at St Joseph's Church in Penketh on Monday 14 September 2009.
