= Scouting for Girls discography =

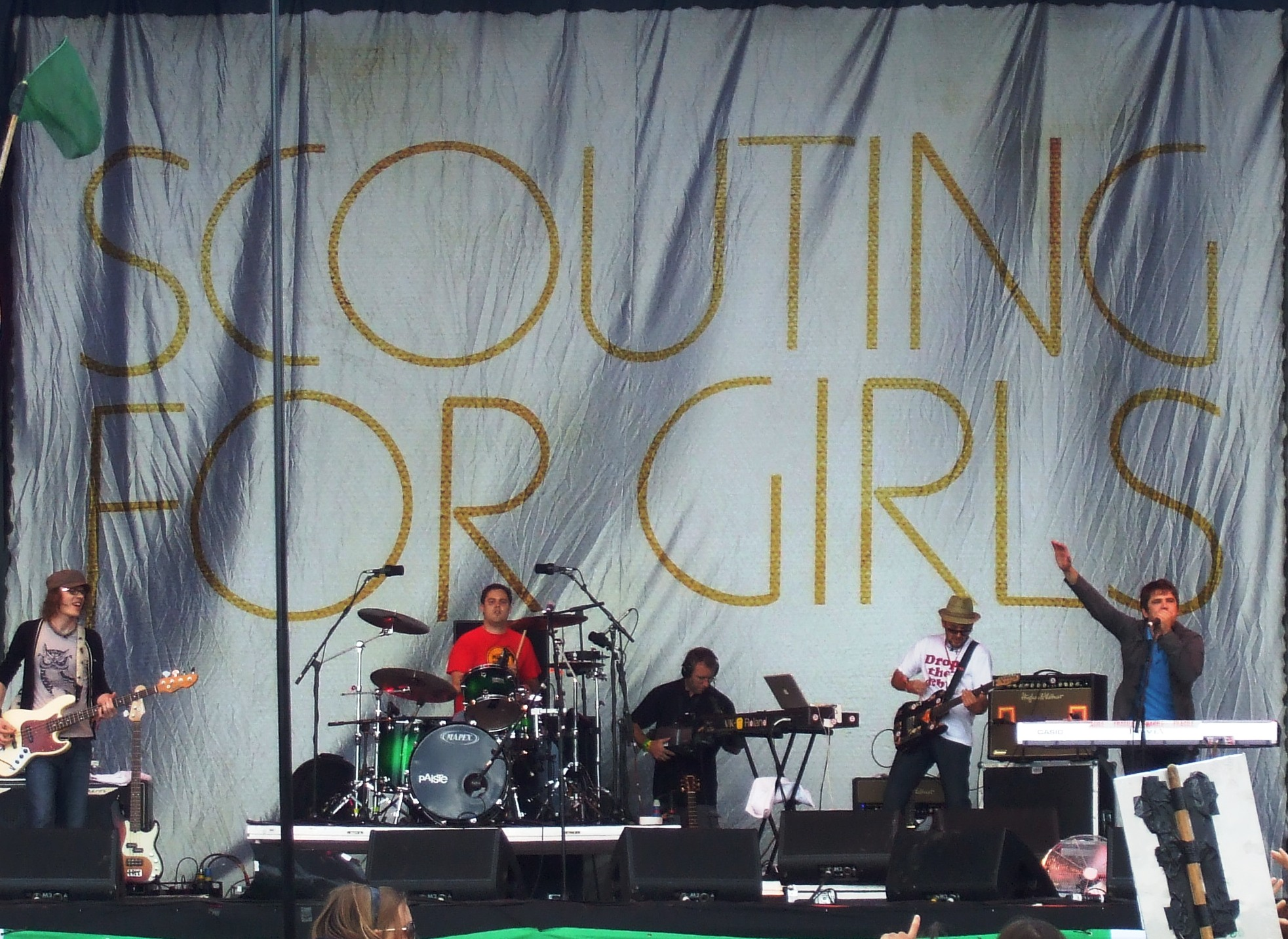
- Playing the "Other Stage" at Glastonbury Festival, June 2008
- Studio albums: 8
- Extended plays: 5
- Compilation albums: 2
- Singles: 32
- Music videos: 25

The discography of Scouting for Girls, a British pop rock band, consists of eight studio albums, two extended plays and thirty-two singles.

== Albums ==
=== Studio albums ===
Year	Album details	Peak chart positions					Sales	Certifications (sales thresholds)
Year	Album details	UK	EU	GER	IRE	SCO	Sales	Certifications (sales thresholds)
2007	Scouting for Girls: Released: 17 September 2007; Label: Epic (#88697155192); Formats: CD, digital download	1	45	—	11	2	UK: 952,303	BPI: 3× Platinum; IRMA: Platinum
2010	Everybody Wants to Be on TV: Release: 12 April 2010; Label: Epic (#88697634362); Formats: CD, digital download	2	12	45	11	2		BPI: Platinum
2012	The Light Between Us: Release: 31 August 2012; Label: Epic (#88725455032); Formats: CD, digital download	10	—	—	—	15		
2015	Still Thinking About You: Release: 16 October 2015; Label: EastWest (#88725455032); Formats: CD, digital download	13	—	—	—	20		
2019	The Trouble with Boys: Release: 27 September 2019; Label: Sony Music; Formats: CD, digital download	25	—	—	—	18		
2021	Easy Cover: Release: 23 April 2021; Label: Near Wild Heaven; Formats: CD, digital download	50	—	—	—	13		
2023	The Place We Used to Meet: Release: 13 October 2023; Label: Sony Music; Formats: CD, digital download	17	—	—	—	13		
2026	These Are the Good Days: Release: 27 March 2026; Label: Near Wild Heaven Records; Formats: CD, digital download	17	—	—	—	—		
"—" denotes a recording that did not chart.

=== Compilation albums ===
Year	Album details	Peak chart positions		Certifications (sales thresholds)
Year	Album details	UK	SCO	Certifications (sales thresholds)
2013	Greatest Hits: Released: 29 July 2013; Label: Epic (#88883737082); Formats: CD, 2CD, digital download	8	11	BPI: Gold
2017	The Very Best of Scouting for Girls – Ten Add Ten: Released: 13 October 2017; Label: Sony; Formats: CD, digital download	24	34	BPI: Gold

== Extended plays ==
Year	EP details	Notes
2007	It's Not About You EP: Released: 25 June 2007; Label: Epic	Limited release EP; Reached number 31 on the UK Singles Chart.
2010	Famous EP: Released: 16 July 2010; Label: Epic	
2010	iTunes Festival: London 2010 EP: Released: 28 July 2010; Label: Epic	
2010	Don't Want to Leave You EP: Released: 8 October 2010; Label: Epic	
2013	Make That Girl Mine EP: Released: 15 November 2013; Label: Epic	

== Singles ==
Single	Year	Peak chart positions										Certifications	Album
Single	Year	UK	AUS	BEL (FL)	EU	GER	IRE	NL	NZ	SCO	SWI	Certifications	Album
"She's So Lovely"	2007	7	—	—	10	—	27	—	—	16	—	BPI: 2× Platinum; RMNZ: Gold	Scouting for Girls
"Elvis Ain't Dead"	2007	8	—	—	10	—	17	—	—	25	—	BPI: Gold	Scouting for Girls
"Heartbeat"	2008	10	—	—	12	—	17	—	—	35	—	BPI: Platinum	Scouting for Girls
"It's Not About You"	2008	31	—	—	—	—	—	—	—	37	—		Scouting for Girls
"I Wish I Was James Bond"	2008	40	—	—	—	—	—	—	—	40	—	BPI: Silver	Scouting for Girls
"Keep on Walking"	2009	198	—	—	—	—	—	—	—	—	—		Scouting for Girls
"This Ain't a Love Song"	2010	1	19	45	2	31	4	41	16	1	17	ARIA: Gold; BPI: Platinum; RMNZ: Gold	Everybody Wants to Be on TV
"Famous"	2010	37	—	62	—	—	—	67	—	24	77		Everybody Wants to Be on TV
"Don't Want to Leave You"	2010	69	—	—	—	—	—	—	—	72	—		Everybody Wants to Be on TV
"Take a Chance"	2010	—	—	—	—	—	—	31	—	—	—		Everybody Wants to Be on TV
"Love How It Hurts"	2011	17	—	—	—	—	—	—	—	16	66	BPI: Silver	The Light Between Us
"Summertime In the City"	2012	73	—	—	—	—	—	—	—	56	—		The Light Between Us
"Without You"	2012	—	—	—	—	—	—	—	—	—	—		The Light Between Us
"Millionaire"	2013	52	—	—	—	—	—	—	—	37	—		Greatest Hits
"Make That Girl Mine"	2013	—	—	—	—	—	—	—	—	—	—		Greatest Hits
"Life's Too Short"	2015	—	—	—	—	—	—	—	—	—	—		Still Thinking About You
"Christmas in the Air (Tonight)"	2015	—	—	—	—	—	—	—	—	—	—		Still Thinking About You
"Home"	2016	—	—	—	—	—	—	—	—	—	—		Still Thinking About You
"Dancing in the Daylight"	2017	—	—	—	—	—	—	—	—	—	—		The Very Best of Scouting for Girls – Ten Add Ten
"England I Still Believe"	2018	—	—	—	—	—	—	—	—	—	—		Non-album single
"Grown Up"	2019	—	—	—	—	—	—	—	—	—	—		The Trouble with Boys
"Let's Not Go Away"	2019	—	—	—	—	—	—	—	—	—	—		Non-album single
"Everybody Wants to Rule the World"	2021	—	—	—	—	—	—	—	—	—	—		Easy Cover
"The Place We Used to Meet"	2023	—	—	—	—	—	—	—	—	—	—		The Place We Used to Meet
"The Missing Part"	2023	—	—	—	—	—	—	—	—	—	—		The Place We Used to Meet
"Glow"	2023	—	—	—	—	—	—	—	—	—	—		The Place We Used to Meet
"Song I Can't Forget"	2024	—	—	—	—	—	—	—	—	—	—		The Place We Used to Meet
"Raise A Glass"	2024	—	—	—	—	—	—	—	—	—	—		The Place We Used to Meet
"These Are the Good Days"	2025	—	—	—	—	—	—	—	—	—	—		These Are the Good Days
"Don't You Go Solo"	2026	—	—	—	—	—	—	—	—	—	—		These Are the Good Days
"Get What You Give"	2026	—	—	—	—	—	—	—	—	—	—		These Are the Good Days
"A Little Bit Of Love"	2026	—	—	—	—	—	—	—	—	—	—		Non-album single
"—" denotes a recording that did not chart or was not released in that territory.

== Music videos ==
Year	Song	Director
2007	"It's Not About You"	Lorrin Braddick
2007	"She's So Lovely"	Henry Schofield
2007	"Elvis Ain't Dead"	Joey Hall
2008	"Heartbeat"	Lorrin Braddick
2008	"I Wish I Was James Bond"	Youth Club
2009	"Keep on Walking"	John Paveley
2010	"This Ain't a Love Song"	Eric Liss
2010	"Famous"	Nicholas Bentley
2010	"Don't Want to Leave You"	Ian Bonhôte
2010	"Love How It Hurts"	Jonnie Malachi
2012	"Summertime in the City"	Remy Cayuela
2012	"Without You"	Courtney Phillips
2013	"Millionaire"	Lewis Arnold
2014	"Rains in LA"	Liam Hooper
2015	"Life's Too Short"	Ian Gamester
2015	"Getting to Know You"	—N/a
2015	"Christmas in the Air (Tonight)"	Damien Reeves
2016	"Home"	Liam Hooper
2017	"Dancing in the Daylight"	Aella Jordan-Edge
2019	"Grown Up"	Chris Chance
2019	"Let's Not Go Away"	Katie Gascoyne
2021	"Everybody Wants to Rule the World"	Jamie O'Gorman
2023	"The Place We Used to Meet" (Lyric video)	
2023	"The Missing Part"	
2023	"Glow"	
