= Roy Stride =

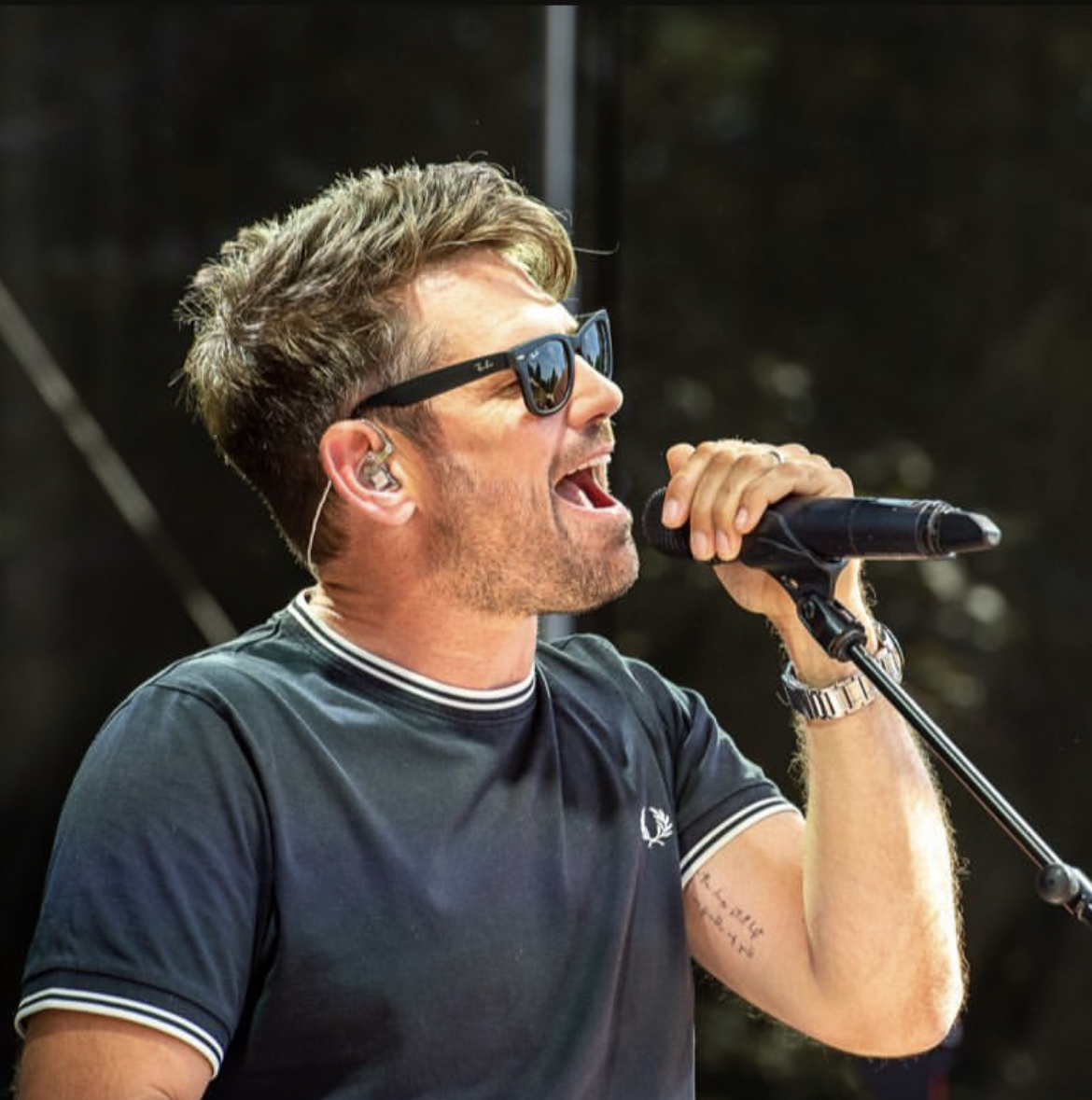

Background information
- Born: 11 March 1979 (age 47); England
- Origin: London
- Genres: Indie, rock, pop
- Occupations: Songwriter, producer, musician
- Instruments: Vocals; guitar; piano; keyboards
- Years active: 2007 – present
- Label: Epic Sony Records East West Records

Roy Stride (born 11 March 1979) is an English musician, songwriter and producer, also known for fronting the multi-platinum-selling UK band Scouting for Girls. He has combined worldwide single and album sales in excess of 15 million. His songs have featured on three US No. 1 albums and three UK No. 1 albums, and have been streamed on Spotify more than two billion times. He has been nominated for one Ivor Novello and four Brit Awards.

With Scouting for Girls, he has written and produced four top 10 albums and four top 10 singles in the UK. Their self-titled debut album topped the charts in 2008 and sold over a million copies, yielding three top 10 singles ("She's So Lovely", "Heartbeat", "Elvis Ain't Dead"). Their follow-up single "This Ain't a Love Song" reached No. 1 for two weeks in 2010.

He has written and produced records for a diverse range of artists including 5 Seconds of Summer, Jax Jones, One Direction, Seafret, Calum Scott, Scouting for Girls and The Vamps.

== Podcasts ==
As well as appearing as a guest on many music based podcasts, he has his own aviation podcast, "Top Landing Gear", which he hosts along with Rob Curling, Jeremy Curling and James Cartner.

== Select discography ==
=== Singles ===
- 2026: "These Are The Good Days – Scouting for Girls (3m streams)
- 2025: "Driftwood" - James Morrison and Seafret (3m Streams)
- 2023: "Whistle" – Jax Jones and Calum Scott (UK No. 14 – 200m Streams)
- 2022: "Atlantis" – Seafret (UK No. 38 – 2bn Streams)
- 2021: "Secret Tattoo" – Scouting for Girls (5m streams)
- 2017: "Butterflies" – Scouting for Girls (15m streams)
- 2016: "Oceans" – Seafret (250m streams) (400m streams)
- 2016: "Best is Yet to Come" – LuvBug (UK No. 68 – 20m streams)
- 2015: "Hole in My Heart" – Luke Friend (UK No. 40 – 5m streams)
- 2014: "Good Girls" – 5 Seconds of Summer (UK No. 19 / US No. 34 – 100m streams)
- 2014: "Tonight (We Live Forever)" – Union J (UK No. 9 – 1m streams)
- 2013: "Millionaire" – (Scouting for Girls) (UK No. 52 – 5m streams)
- 2011: "Love How It Hurts" – Scouting for Girls (UK No. 18 – 10m streams)
- 2010: "This Ain't a Love Song" – Scouting for Girls (UK No. 1 – 60m streams)
- 2008: "Heartbeat" – Scouting for Girls (UK No. 10 – 40m streams)
- 2008: "Elvis Ain’t Dead" – Scouting for Girls (UK No. 8 – 40m streams)
- 2007: "She's So Lovely" – Scouting for Girls (UK No. 7 – 170m streams)

=== Album tracks ===
- 2026: All Songs – "These Are The Good Days" - – Scouting for Girls (UK No. 17)
- 2023: All Songs – "The Place We Used To Meet" – Scouting for Girls (UK No. 17)
- 2021: "I Wish It Was 1989", "Neon Lights", "Xmas in the 80s" – Scouting for Girls (appears on Easy Cover) (UK No. 40)
- 2020: "Love Wont Let Me Leave" – Seafret (appears on Most of Us Are Strangers)
- 2019: All Songs – Scouting for Girls (appears on The Trouble with Boys) (UK No. 25)
- 2017: "All Around the World" The Vamps (appears on Night & Day (UK No. 1)
- 2016: "Oceans", "Atlantis", "Give Me Something", "Be There", "Skimming Stones", "There's a Light" – Seafret (Appears on Tell Me It's Real) (UK No. 45)
- 2015: "Invisible" – 5 Seconds of Summer (appears on Sounds Good Feels Good) (US No. 1 / UK No. 1 / Aus No. 1 / Can No. 1 / Italy No. 1 / Norway No. 1)
- 2015: All Songs – Scouting for Girls (appears on Still Thinking About You) (UK No. 13)
- 2014: "23:59" – McBusted (appears on McBusted) (UK No. 9)
- 2014: "Good Girls", "Eighteen", "English Love Affair", "Close as Strangers", "5 Seconds of Summer" (appears on 5 Seconds of Summer) (US No. 1 / UK No. 2 / Aus No. 1 / Can No. 1)
- 2013: All Songs – Scouting for Girls (appears on Scouting for Girls Greatest Hits) (UK No. 10)
- 2012: All Songs – Scouting for Girls (appears on The Light Between Us) (UK No. 10)
- 2011: "Stand Up" – One Direction (appears on Up All Night) (US No. 1 / UK No. 2 / Aus No. 1)
- 2010: All Songs – Scouting for Girls (appears on Everybody Wants to Be on TV) (UK No. 2)
- 2007: All Songs – Scouting for Girls (appears on Scouting for Girls) (UK No. 1)
