= Nick Raphael =

English musician

- Born: Nick Raphael
- Origin: London, United Kingdom
- Genres: Dance, Pop, Rap, RnB, and Classical
- Occupations: Music Industry Executive, Nightclub promoter, DJ, Recording Artist, Remixer
- Years active: 1987 – present
- Labels: London, FFRR, Arista, Sony Music, Epic, Capitol Records

Nick Raphael is a music industry executive and entrepreneur born in London, England. He is a former President of Capitol Records in the UK.

== Career ==
In the early 1990s, Raphael moved to Leeds, UK and organised, managed and promoted several night club venues such as Hi Flyers, The Gallery and The Warehouse. This led him to becoming a DJ and recording artist with partner Paul Fryer under the name 'TWA'. Raphael, Fryer and Suzy Mason then started the Vague club, which ran between 1993 and 1996. His work throughout 1991 until 1994 as a Night Club promoter, DJ, recording artist and remixer led Raphael to his first corporate job in the UK music industry in 1994 at London Records UK, where he served as Product and later Label Manager for FFRR. In 1996, he left London Records to start NorthWestSide (NWS) Records (at BMG) with Christian Tattersfield. They signed Jay-Z the same year.

In 2000, NorthWestSide Records was rolled into Arista Records and Raphael was appointed A&R Director. In 2007 Raphael was appointed as the managing director of Epic Records UK. Raphael stayed with Sony for 10 years he left in 2011 with Jo Charrington to relaunch London Records for Universal Music. After Universal bought EMI they decided to launch Capitol Records in the US and UK in April 2013. London Records roster and staff were rebranded Capitol Records UK - with Raphael named as president. Over the next eight years the artists signed, A 'n' R'ed and released by Capitol Records UK included Sam Smith (the multi Grammy, Oscar and Brits award winner), 5 Seconds of Summer (the first band in Billboard history to have their first three albums to debut at #1 the Billboard top 200 album chart) and Liam Payne (from One Direction).

In 2008, Nick Raphael together with Jo Charrington founded the companies Salli Isaak Songs Limited and Salli Isaak Music Publishing Limited. Collectively, the Salli Isaak roster has written twenty UK Top 10 singles, nine UK No.1 singles, and won multiple Ivor Novello Awards. in 2018, both Salli Isaak companies were acquired by Downtown Music Publishing.

The End of 2021 Nick Raphael left Capitol Records UK to start a new venture with the ex Chairman of Warner Music UK Christian Tattersfield. The pair who had previously worked together have set up the NWS Music Group which includes records, publishing and sync (the latter two with Ben Bodie).

== Career progression ==
Posts held at the following record companies since 1994;

- London Records UK – Product Manager 1994 - 1995
- FFRR UK – Label Manager 1995 - 1996
- BMG UK 1996–2000
- NorthWest Side Records UK – Label Founder – 1996 - 2000
- * Arista Records UK – A&R Director 2000 - 2001
- Epic Records UK –Managing Director 2001 -2002
- Sony Music UK – Vice President - 2002–2004
- Sony/BMG UK – A&R - 2004–2005
- White Rabbit Records – Label owner - 2005 - 2007
- Epic Records UK –Managing director - 2007 - 2011
- London Records UK - President 2011 - 2013
- Capitol Records UK - President 2013 - 2022
- NWS Music Group - Owner/Founder 2022–Present

== Artists discovered or signed by Nick Raphael ==
Raphael (alongside Tattersfield and Charrington) has signed, and launched a number of artists including

- 5 Seconds of Summer at London/Capitol with Charrington.
- Aloe Blacc at Epic with Charrington.
- Another Level at NWS/BMG with Tattersfield
- Armand Van Helden
- Big Brovaz
- Charlotte Church at Epic with Charrington.
- G4 at Epic with Charrington.
- Imogen Heap at Sony/BMG and NWS Music Group
- Jay-Z, with Tattersfield
- JLS at Epic with Charrington.
- Lemar at Epic with Charrington.
- Mylo
- Olly Murs at Epic/Whiterabbit Records/Sony with Charrington.
- Paloma Faith, at Epic with Charrington.
- The Priests at Epic with Charrington.
- Sam Smith at London/Capitol with Charrington.
- Scouting For Girls at Epic with Charrington.
- Aitch at Capitol Records with Colin Batsa and Jo Charrington
- Jimmy Napes at Salli Isaak Songs ltd with Jo Charrington
- The Gypsy Queens at London/Capitol with Charrington.

== Awards and nominations ==
=== Music Week Awards ===
In 2010, Raphael and Charrington were recipients of the Music Week A&R award, which they received again in 2015 making them the only A&R team to win the award twice.

Year	Nominee / work	Award	Result
2010	Nick Rapahel & Jo Charrington (Capitol Records)	A & R Award	Won
2015	Nick Rapahel & Jo Charrington (Capitol Records)	A & R Award	Won
