= Hole in My Heart =

Hole in My Heart may refer to:

- "Hole in My Heart" (Alphabeat song), 2010
- "Hole in My Heart" (Blackhawk song), 1997
- "Hole in My Heart" (Luke Friend song), 2015
- "Hole in My Heart (All the Way to China)", a song by Cyndi Lauper, 1988
- "Hole in My Heart", a song by Sleeping with Sirens from Gossip, 2017
- A Hole in My Heart, a 2004 Swedish drama film
