= Rob Curling =

British television presenter (born 1957)

Rob Curling (born 8 September 1957, in Kuala Lumpur, Malaya) is a British television presenter and journalist. He presents the sport for Sky News. He also fronts the tennis coverage for British Eurosport. Up to and including 2011, he anchored BBC Sport's interactive television coverage of: Olympic Games, Commonwealth Games, Wimbledon, Open Golf, Six Nations Rugby and World Athletics Championships. He was the host of the game show Turnabout, which aired on BBC One for eight series between 1990 and 1996. He presented the Halford Tour Series cycling for ITV4, and commentated on table tennis on the BBC at the 2010 Commonwealth Games in Delhi.

He has hosted podcasts for The Guardian, including the 2007 Cricket World Cup.

Curling appeared on the show Banzai and TV's 100 Funniest Moments for Channel 4, Sky One's Brainiac, The Basil Brush Show (BBC One), and Through the Keyhole (BBC One & Sky). He also starred in the last series of Beadle's About.

He also appeared in the film Children of Men.

He appeared in the Netflix show The Crown series 4, episode 1 ("Gold Stick"), as the commentator at Princess Anne's circuit at Badminton trials.

== Podcasts ==
In addition to appearing on many tennis-based podcasts as a guest, Rob hosts his own aviation podcast, Top Landing Gear, with Scouting for Girls frontman Roy Stride, Rob's brother Jeremy and pilot James Cartner. "The interest in flying came from my father, he loved aeroplanes and used to take us to the airshows at Farnborough and Biggin Hill," he told the Old Cranleighan Society. "We also had a little plane crash just yards from our garden which strengthened my interest even more.” Incidentally, that was another one of my school history projects: 'The History of Commercial Aviation Up to the Jet Age.' History at Cranleigh eh? Great fun!"

== Education ==
Curling was educated at the independent Cranleigh School in Cranleigh, Surrey.

== Video narration ==
Curling has narrated various videos about railway lines, including:

- Bakerloo line and Waterloo & City line
- Jubilee line
- Circle line and Hammersmith & City line
- Northern line
- Piccadilly line
- East London line and District line
- Central line
- Victoria line
- Metropolitan line
- Hammersmith & City line and District line
- North London line by Silverlink Metro
- Reading to London Waterloo by South West Trains
- Thames Branches by First Great Western
- Devon Branches Exmouth to Barnstaple by First Great Western
- Devon Branches Plymouth to Gunnislake and Newton Abbot to Paignton by First Great Western
- Tyne Valley line, Carlisle to Newcastle by Northern Rail
- The Berks And Hants Route (Great Western Railway)
- Penzance to Exeter St Davids (Great Western Railway)
- North Downs Line (Gatwick Airport to Reading ) (Great Western Railway)
- Portsmouth Direct (Portsmouth Harbour to London Waterloo Via Guildford) (South Western Railway)
- Trams in Lisbon, Portugal

== Life and career ==
One of Curling's earliest jobs was in the BBC's Film Archive Library. His on-screen career began in 1987 as a newsreader and co-presenter of the BBC's regional news programme BBC London Plus, later to become Newsroom South East. He was a member of the BAFTA-winning team for the BBC's series of outside broadcasts commemorating 50 years of the end of World War II: D-Day Remembered, VE-50 & VJ-50. He was also nominated for a BAFTA for BBC Education's current affairs series Issues & The Geography Programme.

Curling presents numerous programmes and videos on aviation, including a history of the Spitfire for ITV. He also narrates a series of Drivers' Eye View videos for Video 125 about the London Underground, Reading to Waterloo, Thames Branchlines and Devon Branchlines. As well as a broadcaster, Curling is a conference and awards host, after dinner speaker and media trainer.
