= Jo Charrington =

Music Industry Executive

- Born: Joanna Charrington; London, United Kingdom
- Occupation: Music industry executive
- Years active: 1992–present
- Employer: Capitol Records UK
- Known for: A&R work with artists like Sam Smith, Paloma Faith, 5 Seconds of Summer
- Awards: GRAMMY Awards, BRIT Awards, American Music Awards, Ivor Novello Awards, MOBO Awards (via associated acts)

Jo Charrington is a prominent music industry executive, widely recognised as one of the most influential and successful female A&R executives in British music history. She currently serves as the President of Capitol Records UK, a subsidiary of Universal Music Group. Charrington's work has contributed to the success of artists who have won prestigious awards, including GRAMMY Awards, BRIT Awards, American Music Awards, Ivor Novello Awards, and MOBO Awards. Over her career, her contributions have resulted in over 30 platinum or multi-platinum albums.

== Career ==
=== Early music and management career (1992–2001) ===
Charrington's career began in 1992 as a marketing assistant at London Records. She later moved to Virgin Records’ International Department and subsequently joined BMG.

In 1996, Charrington left BMG to co-manage the R&B boyband Another Level with John Reid, who had managed Elton John and Queen. The group signed with Northwestside Records, a subsidiary of BMG founded by Nick Raphael and Christian Tattersfield. Another Level achieved several Top 10 hits in the UK, including the Number 1 single "Freak Me" Their debut album earned platinum certification in the UK, and they contributed the track "From the Heart" to the soundtrack of the blockbuster film "Notting Hill"

After Reid’s departure from management, Charrington worked with Simon Fuller, founder of the Spice Girls and the "Idol" franchise, at 19 Management.

=== Sony Music era (2001–2011) ===
In 2001, Charrington was invited by her former London Records colleague Nick Raphael to join Epic Records, a division of Sony Music. At Epic, Charrington and Raphael were pivotal in shaping the label’s roster during a transformative period for British pop and R&B music. Among their notable signings were Paloma Faith and JLS, whose debut single "Beat Again" and self-titled album both topped the UK charts in 2009. Charrington and Raphael also worked with artists such as Olly Murs, Lemar, and Scouting for Girls, further cementing her reputation as a leading A&R executive in a traditionally male-dominated industry.

In 2008, Charrington co-founded Salli Isaak Songs Limited and Salli Isaak Music Publishing Limited, expanding her involvement in music publishing.

=== Universal Music era (2011–present) ===
In 2011, after a decade at Sony, Charrington and Raphael left to join Universal Music Group and relaunched London Records under its new name, Capitol Records UK. As Vice-President of A&R at Capitol, Charrington played a key role in signing and developing artists such as Sam Smith, 5 Seconds of Summer, and Liam Payne. Her work on Smith’s debut album, "In the Lonely Hour", contributed to its worldwide sales of over 12 million copies and helped make it the best-selling debut album of the decade in the UK.

During this time, Charrington became a governor of the BRIT School and participated in a mentoring program organized by "Marie Claire" to inspire the next generation of music industry professionals.

In 2022, Charrington was appointed co-president of EMI Records alongside Rebecca Allen following the merger of the Capitol UK roster into EMI. Charrington brought with her Capitol UK’s general manager, Tom Paul, who became co-managing director. As co-president, Charrington oversaw acts such as Olivia Dean and Caity Baser under EMI and Aitch, Mae Muller, and Zoe Wees under Capitol UK. Under Charrington and Allen's leadership, EMI won the prestigious "Music Week" Record Label of the Year award twice.

In 2024, after Capitol UK merged into the Polydor Label Group, Charrington resumed her role as president of Capitol UK, with Paul continuing as managing director.

== Artists discovered or signed by Jo Charrington ==
Charrington, alongside Raphael, signed and launched a diverse number of platinum and multi-platinum selling artists from 2001 to 2021 including;

- 5 Seconds of Summer at Capitol.
- Sam Smith at Capitol
- Aloe Blacc at Epic.
- Big Brovaz at Epic
- Charlotte Church at Epic.
- G4 at Epic.
- Imogen Heap at Epic.
- JLS at Epic.
- Lemar at Epic.
- Mylo at Epic
- Olly Murs at Epic.
- Paloma Faith at Epic.
- The Priests at Epic.
- Russell Watson at Epic.
- Scouting For Girls at Epic.

== Awards and nominations ==
=== Music Week Awards ===
In 2010 and 2015, Charrington, along with Nick Raphael, won the Music Week A&R Award, becoming the only A&R team to win the award twice.

In 2015, Charrington was named Business Woman of the Year at the Music Week Women in Music Awards.

As co-president of EMI/Capitol, Charrington and Rebecca Allen led the label to win the Music Week Record Label of the Year award in both 2023 and 2024.

Year	Award	Category	Recipient	Result
2010	Music Week Awards	A&R Award	Jo Charrington & Nick Raphael	Won
2015	Music Week Awards	A&R Award	Jo Charrington & Nick Raphael	Won
2015	Music Week Women in Music Awards	Business Woman of the Year	Jo Charrington	Won
2023	Music Week Awards	Record Label of the Year	EMI (led by Jo Charrington & Rebecca Allen)	Won
2024	Music Week Awards	Record Label of the Year	EMI (led by Jo Charrington & Rebecca Allen)	Won

=== Music Business Worldwide Awards ===
In 2022, Charrington won the Music Business Worldwide Pop/R&B A&R Award.

Year	Award	Category	Recipient	Result
2022	Music Business Worldwide Awards	Pop/R&B A&R Award	Jo Charrington	Won
