= Tell Me It's Real (album) =

Studio album by Seafret
- Released: 29 January 2016
- Recorded: 2015
- Genre: Alternative
- Length: 43:35 (Standard); 52:36 (Deluxe)
- Label: Sweet Jane Recordings
- Producer: Steve Robson; Roy Stride

Seafret chronology
Oceans (2015)	Tell Me It's Real (2016)	Acoustic Sessions (2016)

Singles from Tell Me It's Real
- 1. "Atlantis" Released: 1 May 2015; 2. "Be There" Released: 30 June 2015; 3. "Wildfire" Released: 27 November 2015

Tell Me It's Real is the debut studio album by British music duo Seafret. It was released on 29 January 2016 by Sweet Jane Recordings. The album peaked at number 59 on the UK Albums Chart.

== Singles ==
"Atlantis" was released as the lead single from the album on 1 May 2015. "Be There" was released as the second single from the album on 30 June 2015. "Wildfire" was released as the third single from the album on 27 November 2015.

== Critical reception ==
Tell Me It's Real received mixed to positive reviews from music critics. Ashleigh Grady from Clash said, "As standalone singles, perhaps more of the tracks on ‘Tell Me It’s Real’ would hold a greater emotional impact but nevertheless there are moments of real beauty on Seafret's album. The sparse simplicity of the intricate guitar picking and emotive lyrics create a euphoric, wave-like quality [...] ‘Tell Me It’s Real’ will deliver more of the delicate emotion that they love, however, for the undecided listener, a little more variation and experimentation wouldn't go amiss." Molly Kerkham from ForgePress said, "While the album traverses tried and tested ground for love songs, Seafret’s song writing breathes fresh air into these topics. The songs are packed full of metaphors, but ... the lyrics avoid being a collection of romance truisms. At its worst, this album verges towards sounding a bit like a second-rate Mumford and Sons. There's too many over-enthusiastic yet drab guitar build ups."

== Commercial performance ==
On 5 February 2016, Tell Me It's Real entered the UK Albums Chart at number 59, the album also entered the Scottish Albums Chart at number 90. On 7 February 2016, the album entered the Swiss Albums Chart at number 100.

== Oceans video ==
The music video for Oceans drew attention for featuring actress Maise Williams. It was directed by Jonathan Entwistle.

== Track listing ==
Standard edition
No.	Title	Writer(s)	Producer(s)	Length
1.	"Missing"	Jack Sedman; Harry Draper; Wayne Hector; Steve Robson	Steve Robson	3:27
2.	"Give Me Something"	Sedman; Draper; Roy Stride	Roy Stride	2:38
3.	"Wildfire"	Sedman; Draper; Robson	Robson	3:44
4.	"Breathe"	Sedman; Draper	Robson	3:10
5.	"Oceans"	Sedman; Draper; Roy Stride	Stride	3:35
6.	"Over"	Sedman; Draper; Robson; Rømans	Robson	3:44
7.	"Tell Me It's Real"	Sedman; Draper; Robson	Robson	2:59
8.	"Be There"	Sedman; Draper; Roy Stride	Robson	3:15
9.	"Beauty on the Breeze"	Sedman; Draper	Robson	2:41
10.	"Atlantis"	Sedman; Draper; Roy Stride	Robson	3:49
11.	"Skimming Stones"	Sedman; Draper; Robson; Roy Stride	Robson	3:35
12.	"There's a Light"	Sedman; Draper; Roy Stride	Stride	3:42
13.	"To the Sea" (feat. Rosie Carney)	Sedman; Draper; Robson	Robson	3:18

Deluxe edition
No.	Title	Writer(s)	Producer(s)	Length
14.	"Out of Nowhere"	Sedman; Draper; Robson	Robson	2:35
15.	"Overtime"	Sedman; Draper	Robson	2:59
16.	"Oceans" (BBC Live Version)	Sedman; Draper; Roy Stride		3:28

== Charts ==
Chart (2016)	Peak position
Scottish Albums (Official Charts)	90
Swiss Albums (Schweizer Hitparade)	100
UK Albums (Official Charts)	59

== Release history ==
Country	Date	Label	Format
United Kingdom	29 January 2016	Sweet Jane Recordings	Digital download; CD
