= This Ain't a Love Song (Scouting for Girls song) =

2010 single by Scouting for Girls

Single by Scouting for Girls

from the album Everybody Wants to Be on TV
- B-side: "Gotta Keep Smiling"
- Released: 26 March 2010
- Studio: Heliocentric
- Genre: Pop rock
- Length: 3:30 (album version); 3:08 (radio edit)
- Label: Epic
- Songwriter: Roy Stride
- Producer: Andy Green

Scouting for Girls singles chronology
"Keep On Walking" (2009)	"This Ain't a Love Song" (2010)	"Famous" (2010)

"This Ain't a Love Song" is a song by English pop rock band Scouting for Girls. It is the first track and single from their second studio album, Everybody Wants to Be on TV. The song premiered on the Scott Mills BBC Radio 1 show on 15 January 2010. Its artwork was released on the band's website on 8 February and its video premiered on the band's website on 18 February. The song itself was released for digital download on 26 March 2010 with a CD release following three days later.

== Chart performance ==
"This Ain't a Love Song" debuted at number one on the UK Singles Chart on 4 April 2010—for the week ending dated 10 April 2010—marking the band's most successful single to date, and their only number-one single. The single remained at the top position for two consecutive weeks before falling to number two in favour of Usher and will.i.am's'"OMG". After spending five weeks within the top 10, the single fell to number 11. "This Ain't a Love Song" spent a total of ten weeks within the top 40 and 22 weeks within the Top 100. In Scotland, the song spent three weeks at number one—keeping "OMG" off the top spot—then fell to number five on 25 April.

In Ireland, "This Ain't a Love Song" debuted in the Irish Singles Chart at number 34, later climbing to number four, marking the band's only top five hit there. The single debuted on the Australian Singles Chart on 24 May 2010 at number 36, peaking at number 19. The single charted in several other countries as well, entering the top 40 in Austria, Germany, Hungary, the Netherlands, and New Zealand.

== Music video ==
The video for "This Ain't a Love Song" was filmed at London City Airport and a technical college in Rainham, East London, and was directed by Eric Liss. The idea for the video came from the lead singer, Roy Stride. The original video was dismissed as being too dark so the version that was released was filmed. These shots included a girl waiting for her flight crew mother, two male friends and an old couple. The video also involved several night shots.

== Personnel ==
Performance credits

- Vocals: Roy Stride, Greg Churchouse
- Bass: Greg Churchouse
- Percussion: Pete Ellard
- Piano: Roy Stride
- Guitar: Roy Stride

Technical credits

- Production: Andy Green

== Charts ==
=== Weekly charts ===
Chart (2010)	Peak position
Australia (ARIA)	19
Austria (Ö3 Austria Top 40)	34
Belgium (Ultratop 50 Flanders)	45
Europe (European Hot 100 Singles)	7
Germany (GfK)	31
Hungary (Rádiós Top 40)	40
Ireland (IRMA)	4
Netherlands (Dutch Top 40)	13
Netherlands (Single Top 100)	41
New Zealand (Recorded Music NZ)	16
Scottish Singles Sales (Official Charts)	1
Switzerland Airplay (Schweizer Hitparade)	28
UK Singles (Official Charts)	1

Chart (2016)	Peak position
UK Singles Downloads (Official Charts)	63

=== Year-end charts ===
Chart (2010)	Position
Australia (ARIA)	100
UK Singles (OCC)	41

== Certifications ==
Region	Certification	Certified units/sales
Australia (ARIA)	Gold	35,000^{^}
New Zealand (RMNZ)	Gold	15,000^{‡}
United Kingdom (BPI)	Platinum	600,000^{‡}
^{^} Shipments figures based on certification alone.^{‡} Sales+streaming figures based on certification alone.

== Release history ==
Region	Date	Format	Label	Ref.
United Kingdom	26 March 2010	Digital download	Epic	
Australia	26 March 2010	Digital download	Epic	
Belgium	26 March 2010	Digital download	Epic	
United Kingdom	29 March 2010	CD	Epic	
United States	2 April 2010	Digital download	Epic	

== See also ==
- List of number-one singles from the 2010s (UK)
