= These Are the Good Days =

Studio album by Scouting for Girls
- Released: March 27, 2026

Scouting for Girls chronology
The Place We Used to Meet (2023)	These Are the Good Days (2026)

These Are the Good Days is the eighth studio album by the English band Scouting for Girls, released on 27 March 2026. It was announced in November 2025. The album was recorded in California, Dublin and England.

It reached number 17 on the UK Albums Chart. It was supported by the singles "These Are the Good Days", "Don't You Go Solo", and "Get What You Give".

== Background and release ==
On 7 November 2025, they announced the release of their forthcoming eighth studio album, These Are the Good Days, adding it would be released on 27 March 2026. The title track was released as a single on the same day as the album announcement.

On 30 January 2026, the band released the single "Don't You Go Solo". The album's third single, "Get What You Give", followed on 19 March 2026. The album was released on 27 March 2026, to positive reviews.

== Commercial performance ==
These Are The Good Days charted at number 17 on the UK Albums Chart, matching the position of their previous album; additionally, it debuted at number nine on the UK Albums Sales Chart, number two on the UK Albums Downloads Chart, and at number five on the UK Independent Albums Chart.

== Track listing ==
1. "These Are the Good Days"
2. "Get What You Give"
3. "Waiting for Your Love"
4. "Stars Never Fade"
5. "Don't You Go Solo"
6. "As Bad as You Are Beautiful"
7. "Love Gone Bad"
8. "Counting Down the Days"
9. "Still Feel the Love"
10. "Alright in the End"
