= Mimi Trepel =

American radio broadcaster and record company executive

- Born: Miriam Trepel; May 7, 1908; Brooklyn, New York, U.S.
- Died: September 18, 2006 (aged 98); Palm Beach, Florida, U.S.
- Other name: Miriam Trepel Jordan
- Occupations: Radio producer and announcer; Record company distribution executive

Miriam P. "Mimi" Trepel (May 7, 1908 – September 18, 2006) was an American radio broadcaster who became a pioneering record industry distribution manager, described by writer John Broven as "an unseen heroine of rock 'n' roll."

== Biography ==
She was born in Brooklyn, the daughter of Russian Jewish immigrants, and studied at the Feagin School of Dramatic Art. She worked as a drama coach before deciding to work in radio broadcasting. In 1944, she started working at WLIB, where she became involved in music programming and production, responsible for classical music programming and announcements, and broadcasting shows by Oscar Brand, Ella Fitzgerald, Ethel Waters and others.

In 1946 she moved to work at station WMCA, which was located immediately adjoining "Tin Pan Alley". There, she became acquainted with the work of music publishers, and copyright responsibilities, before moving back to WLIB as head of music programming in 1947. While there, she married her third husband, Murray Jordan, a radio announcer. As the playing of records on radio became more important than live sessions, she left the radio industry in 1954, and joined London Records, the American subsidiary of Decca Records. She was soon appointed as head of the company's music publishing subsidiaries, Burlington Music (for BMI copyrights) and Felsted Music (for ASCAP), as well as managing the company's foreign distribution department.

This role gave Trepel responsibility for negotiating releases, in Britain and elsewhere, by the American artists recording for the company and its associates and licensors, including Atlantic, Monument, and Dot. According to Motown historian Adam White: "She helped to transmit a generation’s worth of revolutionary music into Britain, most of it from bold, independent American labels whose output simply defined rock & roll and rhythm & blues: Imperial, Specialty, Sun, Atlantic, Chess, Vee-Jay, Philles – and Motown...". She represented the Decca and London companies around the world, and was one of the few women with positions of responsibility in the record industry at that time. However, by the late 1960s, independent record companies such as Atlantic increasingly sought to establish their own identities and imprints overseas, and her role diminished. She retired in 1975.

After her retirement, she wrote and performed classical music in Manhattan, and at the age of 78 graduated with a degree from Fordham University. She died in Palm Beach, Florida, in 2006 at the age of 98.
