= Turnabout (game show) =

- Genre: Game show
- Created by: Clive Doig
- Presented by: Rob Curling
- Theme music composer: Martin Cook
- Country of origin: United Kingdom
- Original language: English
- No. of series: 8
- No. of episodes: 239

Production
- Production locations: Capital Studios (1990–92); New Broadcasting House (1993–96)
- Running time: 25 minutes (1990–92, 94–96); 30 minutes (1993)
- Production company: Turnabout Productions

Original release
- Network: BBC1
- Release: 26 March 1990 – 7 October 1996

Turnabout is a BBC Television daytime quiz programme that aired on BBC1 from 26 March 1990 until 7 October 1996. The programme was hosted by Rob Curling.

== Format ==
Three contestants competed to solve word puzzles and play various games. Each was assigned a colour: red, green (orange in series 1), or blue. After the final game was complete, the contestant with the highest score was declared the day's winner. The winners and highest-scoring losers during a series were invited back at its end to compete in a tournament for prizes.

=== Sphere Game ===
This game was played with a 4-by-4 grid of 16 spheres. The host specified a sequence of three letters that had to appear in each correct word and asked a series of toss-ups on the buzzer. For each toss-up, a string of blanks was shown to indicate the number of letters in the word, with the three given ones already filled in. (E.g. LAB----- and a clue of "hired worker" would lead to LABOURER.) A correct buzz-in answer allowed the contestant to change the colour of one sphere; from series 2, a miss deducted 5 points from their score and allowed the contestant who had buzzed-in second (if any) to answer.

Each player started the game with four spheres of their own colour already on the board, and the remaining four were grey. The rules on changing sphere colours varied. Originally, a contestant could choose any sphere after a correct answer; a grey one (in the centre of the board) would turn directly to their colour, while any other sphere would advance in a three-step cycle, from red to orange to blue and back to red. Later, the four grey spheres were moved to the corners and had to be changed before any others could be selected, and any chosen sphere would go directly to that contestant's colour.

Contestants scored 5 points for making a horizontal/vertical/diagonal row of three spheres in their own colour, or 10 points for a line of four. If a move created multiple scoring lines, the contestant earned points for all of them. The round ended after three minutes had elapsed, and a second round was immediately played with the three-letter sequence reversed (e.g. "LAB" becoming "BAL"). The grid was not reset between the two rounds. When the grey spheres were placed in the corners, the starting arrangement of the board was such that all four of them had to be changed before any contestant could make a scoring line.

In the first series, the highest-scoring contestant at the end of both rounds advanced to play the Star Game, then played the same two opponents in another Sphere Game round with the scores reset to zero. The board was not reset, however, and the colour cycle ran in reverse order (blue to orange to red).

If a game or episode ended in a tie for high score, the contestant with more spheres in their own colour was the winner.

=== Palindrome Game (1994) ===
This round was played identically to the Sphere Game, but the three given letters read the same forwards and backwards (e.g. "ELE").

=== Star Game ===
In the first two series, the highest scorer of the Sphere Game played this round alone, using a grid of 16 words that each contained one of the two three-letter sequences that had just been used. They had 10 seconds to study the grid, then 50 seconds to match the words with clues given by the host. Five points were awarded for each correct answer; in the first four series, any contestant who answered all 16 words without a pass or miss received 20 bonus points.

From Series 3 onwards, all three contestants had a chance to play the Star Game in ascending order of score from the previous round. Each chose one of three sequences, which would appear in all of their words. Two of the choices were the sequences that had been used in the Sphere Game, while the third was a different one using the same letters, or the one from the Palindrome Game when it was played.

=== About Turn (1995–96) ===
The contestants were shown a word with three consecutive letters removed, which formed a word of their own, and the host read a clue on the buzzer. Giving the correct three-letter word scored 15 points for the contestant in third place, 10 for the contestant in second, or 5 for the leader. A miss deducted 5 points.

== Transmissions ==
| Series | Start date | End date | Episodes |
|---|---|---|---|
| 1 | 26 March 1990 | 12 April 1990 | 12 |
| 2 | 25 March 1991 | 16 May 1991 | 28 |
| 3 | 23 March 1992 | 15 May 1992 | 32 |
| 4 | 5 April 1993 | 21 July 1993 | 32 |
| 5 | 30 August 1994 | 14 October 1994 | 32 |
| 6 | 10 July 1995 | 7 September 1995 | 40 |
| 7 | 5 February 1996 | 27 March 1996 | 38 |
| 8 | 2 September 1996 | 7 October 1996 | 25 |
