= Christian Tattersfield =

British music executive

Christian Tattersfield is the founder of Good Soldier Songs and was the CEO of Warner Music UK and chairman of Warner Bros. Records UK.

== Early career ==
Tattersfield began his career in music at London Records in 1990, establishing new labels Systematic and Internal. In 1997, he moved to BMG where he founded the NorthWestSide imprint, whose signings included Jay-Z, Another Level and NSYNC.

Tattersfield founded 14th Floor Records in 2002 as a joint venture with Warner Music UK, where he signed Biffy Clyro, the Wombats, Damien Rice and Ray LaMontagne.

== Good Soldier Songs & Good Soldier Records ==
Tattersfield founded Good Soldier Songs, a recording and music publishing company, based in Tileyard Studios. It has been the home to artists including Biffy Clyro, the 1975, Birdy, Gavin James, Tobtok, Jodie Abacus, Huntar, James Rushent, the Wombats, Freya Ridings, David Gray, Mike Crossey, the Hunna, Coasts, and Colouring.

== Warner Music UK & BRIT Awards ==
Tattersfield was appointed CEO in August 2009, assuming responsibility for the company's UK portfolio, with labels including Atlantic Records, Asylum, Nonesuch, Reprise, Roadrunner, Rhino, sixsevenine, Warner Music Entertainment and Warner Bros. Records.

He was named Chairman of the BRITs Committee for 2013 and 2014.

== Education ==
Tattersfield graduated with from Selwyn College, Cambridge University.
