= London Recordings =

Record label headquartered in the UK

London Records Ltd
- Parent company: Universal Music Group (pre-1980 catalogue, London USA, trademark rights for "London Records" and "London Recordings" names and logos, and distribution of Because Music); Because Music (label and most of post-1980 catalogues, also licenses trademarks from UMG); Warner Music Group (New Order, All Saints, Slash and London-Sire Records, and US post-1998 catalogue); Previously; PolyGram (1980–1998)
- Founded: 1947; 79 years ago
- Founder: Edward Lewis
- Distributors: Decca Records/UMe (pre-1980 catalogue, US 1980-1998 catalogue); Alternative Distribution Alliance (most of post-1980 catalogues); Rhino Entertainment (New Order, All Saints, London-Sire Records, Slash Records, US post-1998 catalogue)
- Genre: Various
- Country of origin: United Kingdom
- Official website: londonrecordings.co.uk

London Recordings logo for Classical releases. This logo is similar to Decca Records's classical label.

London Recordings (or London Records and London Music Stream) is a British record label that marketed records in the United States, Canada, and Latin America for Decca Records from 1947 to 1980 before becoming semi-independent. The London name – as London American Recordings, often shortened to London American – was also used by British Decca in the UK market, for releases taken from American labels, which British Decca licensed.

The label is owned by Because Music, which also owns most of the label's 1980s and 1990s UK catalogue.

== History ==
Gramophone era logo

=== 1950s-1970s ===
London arose from the split in ownership between the British and American branches of Decca Records. The American branch of London Records released British Decca records in the U.S., as British Decca could not use the "Decca" name there as well as vice-versa. The label was noted for classical albums made in then state-of-the-art stereophonic sound, and such artists as Georg Solti, Joan Sutherland, and Luciano Pavarotti.

In a reverse situation, the London name was also used in the UK market by British Decca for releases taken from American labels that were licensed by British Decca, such as Liberty, Imperial, Chess, Dot, Atlantic, Specialty, Essex and Sun, and the first two UK releases from Motown. By the 1960s more licensing deals had been made with Big Top, Monument, Parrot, Philles, and Hi, and subsidiary labels were London Atlantic, London Dot and London Monument (the last featuring Roy Orbison, who remained with London in the UK even after he signed for MGM Records in the U.S.). The lead person in arranging the distribution deals at that time was Mimi Trepel.

An unusual feature was the letter code in the numbering system. From the late 1950s until 1973, the label bore the logo "London American Recordings", and on Radio Luxembourg it was known as "London American".

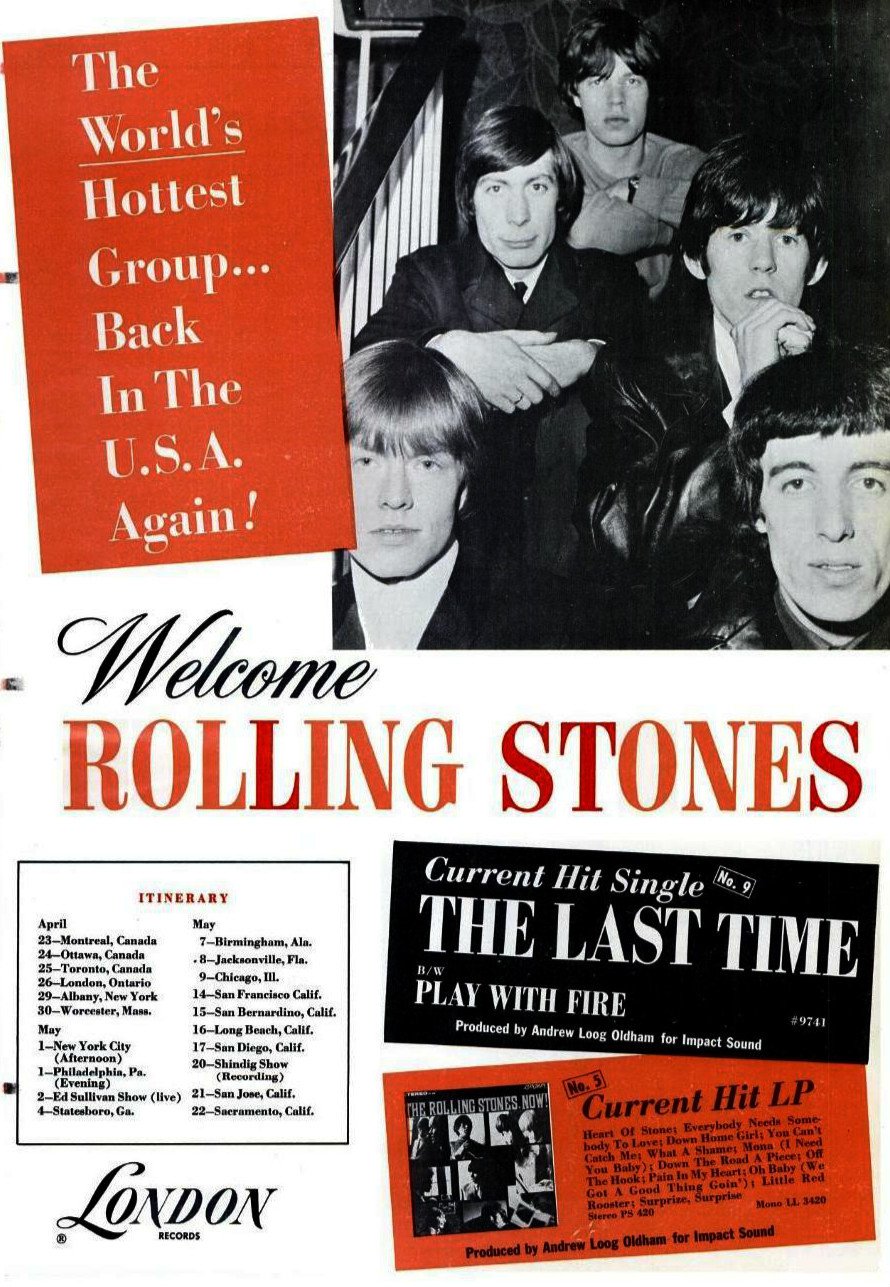
1965 London Records trade ad for the Rolling Stones

In America, the label was best known as the American imprint of the pre–1971 recordings of the Rolling Stones (now owned by ABKCO). The label also originally issued some early LPs and singles by Texas-based band ZZ Top (whose catalog went to Warner Bros. Records when the band signed with that label).

In the 1960s and 1970s London Records got involved in then innovative quadraphonic sound techniques and launched vinyl LPs. Beginning with their "Phase 4" series of immersive, spatialized STEREO sound (which was NOT quadraphonic despite claims to the contrary) which, along with their "FFRR - Full Frequency Range Recording" series and appellation, gained them a well earned reputation on their sound quality.

Phase 4 recordings were originally made on then-novel 4-track tape, but the innovation was in the special scoring used to maximize the technology. Normally in recording techniques of the mid-60s, in order to get the kind of layered sound realized in Phase 4 recordings, required multiple overdubs over multiple reels of tape, bouncing down and bouncing across to different recorders. This increased the level of tape hiss on the final master, something which Phase 4 engineers could not tolerate. So they achieved in their scoring techniques what could be recorded in one pass what everybody else was achieving with multiple overdubs. Similar scoring techniques were used with sound pioneer Enoch Light and his Project 3 Records label around the same period.

In the late 1970s, London signed deals with Bomp! Records and with Big Sound in Connecticut, U.S. This changed the label in the eyes of many from a backwater into something a little more "edgy" compared to the pedestrian contemporary releases from parent company Decca. The label was staffed by Graham Baker, Keith Gooden, Mike Horsham and Liz Roff at that time. Decca's Geoff Milne was in overall control.

The president of London Records in the 1970s was D. H. Toller-Bond (1903-1994).

=== 1980s-1990s ===
After British Decca was acquired by PolyGram in 1980, London followed a more independent course with subsidiary labels such as Slash, Pete Tong's Essential Records and FFRR (London's dance music label, named after part of London's logo design).

In the 1990s, London signed Madchester indie band The High and ended up being fined £50,000 by the BPI in 1991, for suspected chart hyping in the UK Singles chart in regards to this band, with the suspicion that their chart position may have been bought by the record company and not due to fans purchasing their record, "More".

MCA, the owner of American Decca, merged with PolyGram in 1999, which formed Universal Music; however, by this time, London Records had become a semi-independent label within the PolyGram group operated by Roger Ames. In the 1990s, Tracy Bennet became President and Colin Bell, Managing Director. When Ames moved to the Warner Music Group, he took the label with him, and so almost all of London's recent back catalogue was acquired by Warner, which also acquired the London name and trademark from Decca (which still owns most of the pre-1980 back catalogue). The name is still used, mainly for UK-based artists, and for ex-Factory Records artists. Notable artists released by that incarnation of London, called London Records 90, include New Order (initially on their own CentreDate Co. Ltd label), Happy Mondays, A, and Shakespears Sister.

After PolyGram took over British Decca, classical-music albums recorded by British Decca continued to be released on the London label in the U.S., with a logo similar to the Decca classical label logo, until American Decca owner MCA merged with British Decca owner PolyGram in 1999 and formed Universal Music, after which they were all reissued on the original British Decca label in the US.

=== 21st Century ===
The London pop music catalogue owned by Universal Music is now managed by Polydor Records, with United States distribution handled by Island Records after absorbing former distributor Mercury Records in 2014. Decca Records had a recording studio in Blomfield Road, West London; there may have been another in London's West End. In 2010, Universal Music reclaimed ownership of the London Records trademark. Even Universal Music again owned this trademark, Warner Music Group licensed it to be used on its reissues of London's catalogue controlled by Warner Records 90 company. On 1 July 2011 Universal Music reclaimed the London Records name and relaunched it under the executive team of Nick Raphael (president) and later Jo Charrington (senior vice president of A&R) who together previously ran Epic Records for Sony Music Entertainment since 2001. Both had started their careers at London Records in the Ames era in the 1990s.

When Nick Raphael became president of Capitol Records's UK division in 2013, London Records moved there, and operated as a sublabel until Because Music acquired the trademark license in 2017.

In July 2017, Because Music announced that it would acquire Warner Records 90, a subsidiary of Warner Music UK that reissued most London Records artists from the post-1980 era, plus very few titles from the post-1998 era, when Warner Music owned the label. Because Music completed the deal in August 2017, which includes the rights to over fifty London artists (including Bananarama and Happy Mondays), but excluding Slash Records, London-Sire Records, All Saints, New Order, and the FFRR (Full Frequency Range Recordings) brand (which became part of WMG's Parlophone label).

Warner Records 90 was renamed London Music Stream, and later London Recordings.

The label is now operating as London Records again (as part of Because Music Group). The label has reissued many songs by acts such as Bronski Beat, Bananarama, Orbital, Goldie and Happy Mondays.

In May 2026, the podcast Hit That Perfect Beat: The London Records Story was released and covered the label's pop music success from the 1980s through the 1990s.

== Subsidiary or associated labels ==
London Records had dozens of subsidiary and distributed labels throughout its existence. Among the labels are:

- Colonial
- Monument
- Felsted
- Dial
- Double F Double R Records (dance music)
- Sire
- Hi
- Garpax
- Parrot
- Press
- Deram
- Threshold
- MAM
- UK
- Phase 4 Stereo
- FFRR Records (this dance music label is sometimes known as Full Frequency Range Recordings)
- PayDay
- Ffrreedom Records (rave music)
- Go-Feet
- Slash
- Tycoon (for A's material)

== Artists ==
=== Pre-1990 ===
- Ernest Ansermet
- The Bachelors
- Bananarama ("Aie a Mwana" released under Deram, whilst Siobhan Fahey was signed solo as Shakespears Sister in the late 1980s)
- Blancmange
- Bloodstone
- Teresa Brewer
- Bronski Beat
- Caravan
- Kate Ceberano
- Dollar
- Marianne Faithfull
- Fine Young Cannibals
- Funkapolitan
- Garolou
- Genesis
- Buddy Greco
- Grotus
- Adelaide Hall
- The Kane Gang
- The Kinks
- Lisp
- Guy Lombardo
- Los Bravos
- Vera Lynn
- Mantovani
- Marmalade
- John Mayall and the Bluesbreakers
- Meat Puppets
- Mirjam & Stephen
- The Moody Blues
- The Nashville Teens
- No Sweat
- Onslaught
- Perfect Day
- The Poppy Family
- Queen B
- The Rolling Stones
- Salt N Pepa
- Savoy Brown
- Seona Dancing
- The 6ths
- Sleep
- Small Faces
- Sparks
- Specimen
- T2
- Then Jerico
- The Tornados
- Thin Lizzy
- Total Contrast
- Unit 4 + 2
- Universal
- Voice of the Beehive
- The Yes/No People
- Win
- Y&T
- Zulema
- ZZ Top

=== 1990s/2000s ===
- A
- Ace of Base
- Armand Van Helden
- All Saints
  - Shaznay Lewis
  - Melanie Blatt
- Back to the Planet
- Banderas
- Chumbawamba (over One Little Indian Records from 1993 to 1995 and signed to EMI Germany in 1997)
- Marcella Detroit (also part of Shakespears Sister in the early 1990s)
- East 17
- Shane Filan
- Gay Dad
- The High
- Junior
- Kaliphz
- Marion
- Glenn Medeiros
- Menswear
- Dannii Minogue
- New Order
- No Sweat
- Onslaught
- Michelle Shocked
- Showbiz & A.G.
- Jimmy Somerville
- Michaela Strachan
- Sugababes
  - Siobhán Donaghy
- Then Jerico
- Tin Machine (through Victory Music)
- Utah Saints
- Holly Valance
- WC
- Whigfield (signed to Systematic)
- Zucchero

== 2010s (reopened label) ==
- All Saints
- Arlissa
- Dear Prudence
- The Gypsy Queens
- Shakespears Sister

== See also ==
- List of record labels
