= Scouting for Girls =

English pop rock band

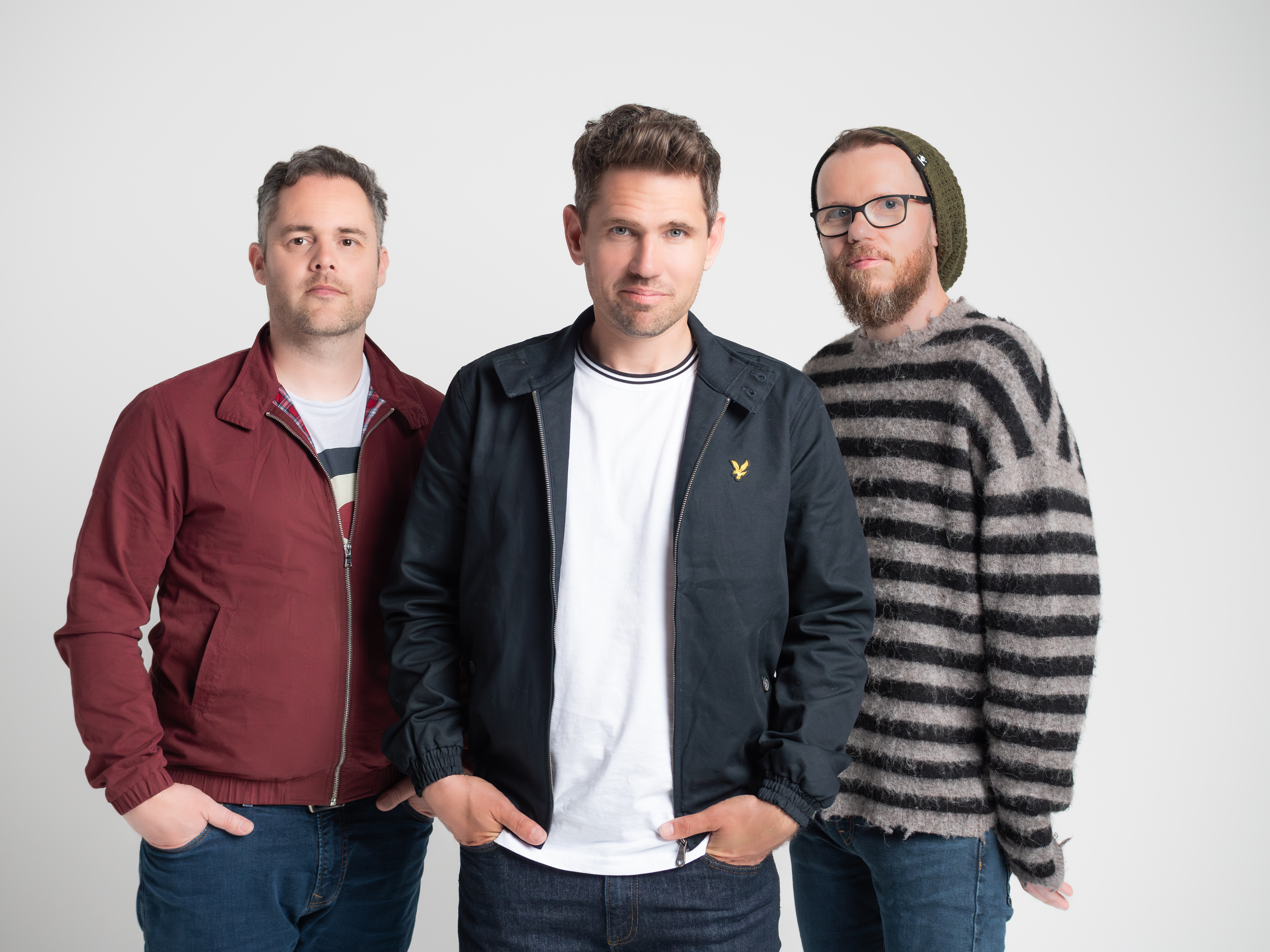
- Scouting for Girls in 2023

Background information
- Origin: London, England
- Genres: Indie pop; pop rock; power pop
- Years active: 2005–present
- Labels: East West; Epic
- Members: Roy Stride; Greg Churchouse; James Rowlands
- Website: scoutingforgirls.com

Scouting for Girls are an English pop rock band. Their name is a play on the title of the 1908 Scouting handbook Scouting for Boys. The band was formed in 2005 by three childhood friends from London, Roy Stride on vocals, piano and guitar, Greg Churchouse on bass guitar and James Rowlands on drums. They signed to Epic Records in 2007 and released their self-titled debut album that September and it reached No. 1 on the UK Albums Chart in 2008. To date, it has sold over one million copies in the UK. Over their career, Scouting for Girls have had eight top 40 singles, sold over four million records in the UK and received over one billion global streams. They have been nominated for four Brit Awards, in 2009 and 2011, and one Ivor Novello Award in 2011.

Scouting for Girls second album, Everybody Wants to Be on TV, was released in April 2010 and peaked at number 2 on the Albums Chart. This was preceded by the single "This Ain't a Love Song", which went to number 1 on the UK Singles Chart for two weeks. The band went on to release a further five albums: The Light Between Us (2012), Still Thinking About You (2015), The Trouble With Boys (2019), Easy Cover (2021) and their most recent studio album, The Place We Used to Meet, which was released in October 2023.

== History ==
=== Formation ===
The founding members had known each other since childhood. Stride and Ellard met in the Beaver Scouts and Churchouse met Stride on their first day at school at Queensmead School in South Ruislip in west London. They attended the school until 1998 then moved on towards a music career. At the age of 15, Roy and Greg were playing together at small gigs in west London. It has been noted that the band was looking for a spirited way of removing themselves from the drudgery of their everyday lives, looking to the whimsy of childhood fantasy through playing a Moog organ. Churchouse has observed on several occasions that playing bass is something he wanted to pursue as the bass has "two less strings".

=== Unsigned and early music: pre-2007 ===
Whilst in university, Stride and Churchouse were in a band called Cape. Scouting for Girls were formed when Stride swapped from playing the guitar to piano. Their first recording was a demo of Keep On Walking which impressed the judges of the 2005 Glastonbury unsigned competition so much that they offered them a place in the final, despite the band having never performed live before. Although they failed to win the competition the band spent the next couple of years building a large online presence through Myspace and hosting their own club nights at the Trinity Pub in Harrow. By 2007 the band had written and recorded demos of most of the songs that would make up their debut album and received airplay and performed sessions on Radio 1 and XFM.

=== 2007–2008: Debut album and early singles ===
At the beginning of 2007 Epic Records A&R Nick Raphael received the band's demo CD. So enthusiastic was his response that he immediately phoned up colleague Jo Charrington and said: "These are hits, let's go see the band in rehearsals!" According to Charrington every other record label had passed on them.

On 14 February 2007, Scouting for Girls were signed to Epic UK (a division of Sony BMG). As the band were signed almost fully formed, with all their songs already written, they headed out to Helioscentric Studios in Rye, East Sussex to begin work on their debut album almost immediately. Produced by Andy Green (Keane, KT Tunstall, The Feeling), the band's first release was the It's Not About You EP, released on 25 June 2007. It sold out, and became the highest-charting limited edition EP in chart history. The album was released in September 2007, and has sold in excess of 1 million copies in the UK alone. It spawned a host of hit singles; "She's So Lovely", "Heartbeat", and "Elvis Ain't Dead".

Scouting for Girls' self-titled album went to number 1 in the UK Albums Chart on 20 January 2008, where it remained for two weeks.

The band toured the UK heavily throughout 2007 and 2008, upgrading and selling out venues in every city they performed. During their first tour of 2008, Roy Stride lost his voice en route to a gig in Birmingham and was diagnosed with laryngitis, forcing the band to reschedule a series of dates on the tour. The rescheduled dates included an extra night in London, with the band selling out a record four consecutive nights at the Shepherds Bush Empire. The band's final tour of the year concluded with two sold-out nights at London's Hammersmith Apollo, and one at London's Brixton Academy.

Scouting for Girls also made a series of appearances in Europe, Japan, Australia and America in 2008, including performances at 2008's SXSW Conference in Austin, Texas and CMJ in New York City.

=== 2009–2012: Everybody Wants to Be on TV and The Light Between Us ===
Scouting for Girls returned to Helioscentric Studios (East Sussex, UK) in 2009 to commence work on their second album with producer Andy Green (who produced the band's eponymous debut album). The album, Everybody Wants To Be on TV, was released in the UK on 12 April 2010. The first single to be taken from the record was "This Ain't a Love Song" which went straight to number 1 in the UK Singles Chart on 4 April 2010, giving the band 2010's Easter Number 1. The track has been added to radio playlists in Australia, including Sydney radio station Nova 96.9 as at May 2010.

In the lead-up to the album's release, Scouting for Girls performed in the Woolpack Pub on the set of long-running British soap, Emmerdale for a Radio Aire session.

Scouting for Girls toured their new album throughout 2010, commencing with a full UK tour throughout late April and May 2010. The band also took part in a sponsored Chopper bicycle ride from London to Brighton for the charity WellChild, raising over £20,000. The band released the second single from the album, "Famous", on 12 July 2010. The single peaked at number 37 on the UK Singles Chart, giving the band their sixth Top 40 single overall.

On 5 March 2012, Scouting for Girls announced via Twitter that they had begun the process of recording their third studio album, The Light Between Us. The album included the top 20 hit "Love How it Hurts" that had reached number 17 in 2011. The Light Between Us debuted at number 10 in the official 100 on 9 September 2012, one week after the release of second single "Summertime In the City".

=== 2013–2015: Greatest Hits and Still Thinking About You ===
In 2013 the band released a Greatest Hits compilation that peaked at number 8 on the UK Albums Chart.

In addition to all their singles, the album also featured new material including the song "Millionaire" which peaked at 52 in the UK charts after release on 22 July 2013.

The band released their fourth album Still Thinking About You in October 2015 on EastWest records. The album reached No.13 on the UK chart and featuring festive fan favourite "Christmas in the Air (Tonight)".

=== 2017–2024 ===
The band announced a show at London's Bush Hall to coincide with the tenth anniversary of them signing their first record deal. The band held a ticket ballot beforehand and received over 20,000 applications for just 300 tickets. The band announced on social media that they were working on new music for release in 2017.

Scouting for Girls announced on their official website that their next album would be released on 13 October 2017 with the lead single called "Dancing in the Daylight". Despite Ten Add Ten featuring 10 new songs, the band refer to The Trouble With Boys as their fifth album in interviews.

In September 2019, Scouting for Girls released their fifth album, The Trouble with Boys, featuring the singles "Count On Me" and "Grown Up" (co-written by James Blunt). A UK tour to promote the new album was also announced for November and December 2019 including a sold out headline show at the Shepherds Bush Empire.

In April 2021, Scouting for Girls released their sixth album, Easy Cover consisting of 8 covers, and 3 brand new tracks. The album was conceived, written and recorded during the pandemic. The band reinterpreting their favourite tracks from their early childhood as a means to escape the boredom of Lockdown

On 25 November 2022, to celebrate their 15th anniversary, Scouting For Girls released an exclusive double vinyl live album recorded in The Trinity Bar Harrow. It was recorded exactly 15 years to the day that they signed to Sony Records and is the first and only live Scouting for Girls album available on vinyl. To celebrate their anniversary and the end of Covid lockdowns the band returned to The Trinity Bar in Harrow to play their first album in full. These two nights sold out in minutes and this recording is interspersed with jokes, stories, a couple of disastrous musical starts and even a marriage proposal.

On 21 April 2023, Scouting for Girls released the single "The Place We Used to Meet". In May 2023, the band announced their forthcoming album would be released in October 2023. On 30 June 2023, the band released the single "The Missing Part". The band released their seventh studio album, The Place We Used to Meet on 13 October 2023. Charting at number 17 on the UK Albums Chart, the album was the band's highest charting album since 2015's Still Thinking About You.

=== 2025–present ===
On 7 November 2025, they announced the release of their forthcoming eighth studio album, These Are the Good Days, adding it would be released on 27 March 2026. The title track was released as a single on the same day as the album announcement.

On 30 January 2026, the band released the single "Don't You Go Solo". The album's third single, "Get What You Give", followed on 19 March 2026. The album was released on 27 March 2026, to positive reviews. These Are The Good Days chartdd at number 17 on the UK Albums Chart, matching the position of their previous album; additionally, it debuted at number nine on the UK Albums Sales Chart, number two on the UK Albums Downloads Chart, and at number five on the UK Independent Albums Chart. On 7 August 2026, they released the single "A Little Bit Of Love".

== Awards ==
Scouting for Girls have never won an award but have been nominated for several over the years.

- Three BRIT Awards in 2009 for British Breakthrough Act, British Live Act and British Single ("Heartbeat").
- 2011 BRIT Award Nomination for Best British Single with 'This Ain't A Love Song'.
- Best New Act category in the MTV Europe Music Awards 2008.
- Ivor Novello 2011 PRS For Music Most Performed Work award for: "This Ain't A Love Song"

== Wolfcubs fan club ==
Before the band were signed to Epic Records, they ran their own fanclub, The Wolfcub Club through their Myspace site. The name was a wordplay similar to the band's name and was partly based on the Dennis the Menace fan club.

Members of the fanclub were called Wolfcubs, and received a welcome pack put together by the band which include a CD of recent demos, a membership card which allowed discounted entry to their gigs, a regular SFG newsletter (similar to the famous Scouting For Boys guide book), and badges. When the band signed their record deal, they carried on producing the membership packs for new fans on the road, until the demand became too high to deal with. However, the Wolfcubs still exist in reference to the band's fans.

== Charity work ==
Scouting for Girls are official ambassadors for the children's charity, Wellchild, and raised over £20,000 for the charity by cycling from London to Brighton on children's chopper bikes in 2010.

The band also hold an annual intimate show at the highest pub in the UK, The Tan Hill Inn, to raise money for Children in Need. In 2016, both the band and audience were trapped overnight in the pub after a snow storm blocked roads down from the venue. Each year the event raises more than £10,000 for charity

In 2017, to celebrate their tenth anniversary, the band undertook ten challenges to raise money and awareness for the Alzheimer's Association. The events include Dry January, The Silverstone Half Marathon and the London Marathon. The band achieved their target of raising £10,000 for the charity.

== Band members ==
Current members

- Roy Stride – lead vocals, guitar, keyboards, piano (2005–present)
- Greg Churchouse – bass, backing vocals (2005–present)
- Peter Ellard – drums (2005–present)

Touring members

- Jamie O'Gorman – guitar (2010–present)
- Nick Tsang – guitar (2022–present)
- Connor McDonald – guitar (2024–present)

Personnel

- Andy Green – producer of Scouting for Girls (2007–2013)
- Jon 'Mags' Maguire – producer of Scouting for Girls (2015–present)
- Alex Oldroyd – producer of Scouting for Girls (2019–present)

== Discography ==
- Scouting for Girls (2007)
- Everybody Wants to Be on TV (2010)
- The Light Between Us (2012)
- Still Thinking About You (2015)
- The Trouble with Boys (2019)
- Easy Cover (2021)
- The Place We Used to Meet (2023)
- These Are the Good Days (2026)
