= The Place We Used to Meet =

Studio album by Scouting for Girls
- Released: 13 October 2023
- Recorded: 2023
- Genre: Pop
- Label: Sony Music

Scouting for Girls chronology
Easy Cover (2021)	The Place We Used to Meet (2023)

Singles from The Place We Used to Met
- 1. "The Place We Used to Meet" Released: 21 April 2023; 2. "The Missing Part" Released: 30 June 2023; 3. "Glow" Released: 22 September 2023; 4. "Song I Can't Forget" Released: 28 June 2024; 5. "Raise A Glass" Released: 13 September 2024

The Place We Used to Meet is the seventh studio album by the English band Scouting for Girls. It was released in the United Kingdom on 13 October 2023. The album produced the singles "The Place We Used to Meet", "The Missing Part", "Glow", "Song I Can't Forget" and "Raise A Glass".

== Background ==
In May 2023, the band announced their forthcoming album would be released in October 2023. In an interview with Chris Evans on Virgin Radio UK, band member Roy Stride said: "There was no great plan, no overthinking beyond just writing and recording the best songs that we could", adding the band "[loved] every part of the process: the recording, the writing, playing live and, most important, just hanging out as friends."

== Promotion ==
=== Singles ===
On 21 April 2023, Scouting for Girls released the single "The Place We Used to Meet". An official lyric video was released on 19 May 2023.

On 30 June 2023, the band released the single "The Missing Part". The music video was released on 25 August 2023.

"Glow", the third single, was released on 22 September 2023. A week later, the official music video was released.

"Song I Can't Forget" and "Raise A Glass" were released as the album's fourth and fifth singles, respectively, in 2024.

=== Tour ===
In April 2023, the band announced a 2024 UK and Ireland tour, titled The Place We Used to Meet Tour - Part Two.

== Track listing ==
1. "Glow" – 3:31
2. "The Missing Part" – 2:51
3. "The Luckiest Boy in the World" – 3:34
4. "Song I Can't Forget" – 3:14
5. "Reckless Love" – 2:36
6. "The Place We Used to Meet" – 3:42
7. "The Place We Used to Meet (reprise)" – 1:13
8. "Running to You" – 3:03
9. "It's Alright Now" – 3:10
10. "Raise a Glass" – 3:13
11. "Too Cool to Call" – 3:10
12. "Marnie's Lullaby" – 2:42

== Chart performance ==
Charting at number 17 on the UK Albums Chart, the album was the band's highest charting album since 2015's Still Thinking About You. The Place We Used to Meet also charted at number 8 on the UK Official Albums Sales chart on 20 October 2023.

== Charts ==
Chart (2023)	Peak position
UK Albums (OCC)	17
