= She's So Lovely (song) =

2007 single by Scouting for Girls

Single by Scouting for Girls

from the album Scouting for Girls
- Released: 27 August 2007
- Length: 3:44
- Label: Epic
- Songwriter: Roy Stride
- Producer: Andy Green

Scouting for Girls singles chronology
"She's So Lovely" (2007)	"Elvis Ain't Dead" (2007)

"She's So Lovely" is a song English pop rock band Scouting for Girls. It was written by band frontman Roy Stride and produced by Andy Green and released on 27 August 2007 as the lead single from their self-titled debut studio album (2007). It served as the band's debut single and their second release overall, after the extended play It's Not About You.

The song peaked at number seven on the UK Singles Chart and also reached a peak of number six on the UK Singles Downloads Chart. The song remained in the UK top 10 for six consecutive weeks.

== Music video ==
The music video for "She's So Lovely" is set in a bowling alley. Roy Stride is trying to attract the attentions of a pretty girl (Louise Glover), but she has a boyfriend (Liyo Cassini) already. While the boyfriend is there, Roy tells the girl she looks beautiful. The boyfriend gets angry, but gets called away for his throw. As he scores a strike, Roy and the girl walk off down the hall together (although only their legs are shown, the shoes and jeans are the same as Roy's).

== Track listings ==
CD single

1. "She's So Lovely"
2. "Murder Mystery"

7-inch vinyl 1

1. "She's So Lovely"
2. "Wonderful Life"

7-inch vinyl 2 (blue)

1. "She's So Lovely" (live)
2. "It's Not About You" (live)

== Charts ==
=== Weekly charts ===
Weekly chart performance for "She's So Lovely"
Chart (2007–2008)	Peak position
Ireland (IRMA)	27
Scottish Singles Sales (Official Charts)	16
UK Singles (Official Charts)	7

=== Year-end charts ===
Year-end chart performance for "She's So Lovely"
Chart (2007)	Position
UK Singles (Official Charts)	46
Chart (2008)	Position
UK Singles (Official Charts)	87

== Certifications ==
Certifications for "She's So Lovely"
Region	Certification	Certified units/sales
United Kingdom (BPI)	3× Platinum	1,800,000^{‡}
^{‡} Sales+streaming figures based on certification alone.

== Use in the media ==
The popularity and catchy nature of the song has seen it used in numerous commercials and television series. The song was heard in TV spots for the American comedy series Ugly Betty. An alternative version of the song was featured in series 2 of the BBC television series Gavin & Stacey. The original version was used for the British film Angus, Thongs and Perfect Snogging, in a scene where the main character Georgia is dressed as a stuffed olive. It has also been used in LACVERT's commercial for their lipstick, Ice Kiss, featuring the Olympic gold medalist Kim Yuna. The Stubborn skit in Gag Concert uses the song too. The song was featured in the BBC soap opera EastEnders at the funeral of Lola Pearce-Brown which played as the coffin entered.

Instrumentals from the track are currently being used in TV spots in the United States for VoIP provider Vonage.
