= Hole in My Heart (Luke Friend song) =

"Hole In My Heart"

Single by Luke Friend
- Released: 29 March 2015
- Recorded: 2014
- Genre: Pop
- Length: 3:05
- Label: RCA Records
- Songwriter(s): Roy Stride, Jon Maguire, Luke Friend

Luke Friend singles chronology
"Hole In My Heart" (2015)	"Liar" (2018)

"Hole In My Heart" is a single by Luke Friend. The song was released on 29 March 2015 in the United Kingdom. The song has peaked at number 40 on the UK Singles Chart.

== Music video ==
A music video to accompany the release of "Hole in My Heart" was first released onto YouTube on 8 February 2015 at a total length of three minutes and twenty-five seconds.

== Track listing ==
Digital download

1. "Hole in My Heart" - 3:05

Remixes

1. "Hole in My Heart" (Acoustic Version) - 3:01
2. "Hole in My Heart" (Wideboys Club Remix) - 3:59
3. "Love & War" (Acoustic) - 3:28

== Charts ==
Chart (2015)	Peak position
UK Singles (OCC)	40

== Release history ==
Region	Date	Format	Label
United Kingdom	29 March 2015	Digital Download	RCA Records
