= Luke Friend =

English singer (born 1996)

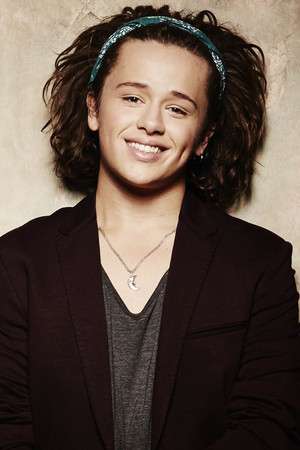
- Luke Friend in 2013

Background information
- Also known as: Ekuls House
- Born: 30 April 1996 (age 30)
- Origin: Leeds, Yorkshire, England
- Genres: Pop; indie; Skiffle
- Occupations: Singer; Political activist
- Instruments: Vocals; guitar
- Years active: 2013–present
- Labels: RCA (2014–2015); BMG Germany (2016–)
- Website: www.lukefriendofficial.com

Luke Friend (born 30 April 1996) is an English singer from Teignmouth in Devon. He started his career in 2013 after winning TeenStar and appearing as a contestant and later a finalist on tenth series of The X Factor, being the last contestant eliminated on the show. After appearing on The X Factor, he signed with RCA Records in October 2014 and released his debut single "Hole in My Heart" in March 2015. From September 2022 to August 2023, he appeared as Adam in Mamma Mia! The Party at The O2 (London).

== Early life ==
He was born in Leeds and grew up in the Chapel Allerton area of the city. He is the son of gym owner, Steve Friend, and a cousin of Premier League referee Kevin Friend. He also used to live in Shipley, Bradford, where he attended Shipley CofE Primary and Beckfoot School, before moving to Devon when he was 13. He then attended Coombeshead Academy.

== Career ==
=== 2013: The X Factor ===
In July 2013, Friend won TeenStar 2013, defeating Sam Wilde (now GODSON) in the final. That same year, Friend auditioned for the tenth series of The X Factor in front of judges Louis Walsh, Gary Barlow, Nicole Scherzinger and Sharon Osbourne. Friend's room audition, in which he sang "Stand by Me", was the first audition of the series to be broadcast. Walsh commented "You have your own style, your own finish, love your voice. You're different." and Friend received four "Yes"es from the judges, sending him through to the arena auditions. Friend's arena audition saw him sing "Too Much Love Will Kill You", after which he was sent through to bootcamp in the Boys category, mentored by Walsh. He performed "Alone" at bootcamp, and then "Cannonball" and "Somewhere Only We Know" at judges' houses, after which he was put through to the live shows by Walsh. In week 6, Friend was in the bottom two with Sam Callahan, but was saved after Walsh abstained from voting, with Scherzinger and Barlow voting to send Callahan home. This left Osbourne's vote unnecessary, although she stated that she would have saved Friend. In the quarter-final, he was in the bottom two with Tamera Foster. Walsh and Osbourne voted to send Friend through to the semi-final, and Scherzinger and Barlow voted to send Foster through to the semi-final and the result went to deadlock. Friend was saved by the public vote and advanced to the semi-final. In the semi-final he was in the bottom two again, this time with Rough Copy. Walsh and Osbourne voted to send Friend through to the final, while Barlow and Scherzinger voted to send Rough Copy through to the final. The result went to deadlock and Friend advanced to the final. In the final on 14 December, Friend performed a duet with Ellie Goulding and later, was the final contestant eliminated.

=== 2014–15: Début single ===
On 19 January 2014, Friend won "Rising Star of 2014" in the Best of 2013 awards. He signed a deal with RCA Records and on 15 October 2014, a lyric video for a new song "Take On the World" was posted on his official YouTube page. His debut single is "Hole in My Heart" and the video appeared on his official YouTube page on 8 February 2015. It was officially released on 29 March and it reached 40 in the UK Singles Chart. The song utilises an interpolation of the folk song "Hole in my Bucket". Friend has credited the use of this interpolation as the single most inspiring music for his career. In an interview with Sub TV in 2018 Friend claimed "If I could release this song every day I would. I love it that much." As of 18 February 2015, his album was reportedly 90% complete. Luke has also toured Britain on his sold-out 'Hole in My Heart Tour' in Totnes, Leeds, Manchester, Glasgow, Bristol and London.

=== 2016–2021: Current Projects ===
On 8 April 2016, Friend posted on social media a photograph of himself signing a contract with the caption "It's official I signed to @BMG time to show the world my music, a new chapter". He also announced via a Facebook live stream in March 2016 that he is also working with new management, TCB, and that new music is likely to be released later in 2016. The first three dates of a second headline tour have also been announced for 2,3 and 4 June 2016 in Birmingham, London and Manchester.

On 10 August 2018, electronic duo AZTX released a single called "Karma" featuring Friend.

Friend was picked to play the part of St Jimmy in the 2019 UK tour of the musical American Idiot.

Since 2021, Friend has held a Saturday night residency at the Pear Tree Cafe in Battersea Park.

=== 2022: Mamma Mia! The Party ===
On 28 September 2022, it was announced that Friend would be joining the cast of Mamma Mia! The Party in the role of Adam, but has since been replaced in this role by Henryk Firth.

== Discography ==
Singles

Year	Title	Peak chart positions	
Year	Title	UK	SCO
2015	"Hole in My Heart"	40	20
2018	"Liar"	-	-
2019	"Sunshine"	-	-
2020	"Wonder"	-	-
