= Seafret =

English rock duo

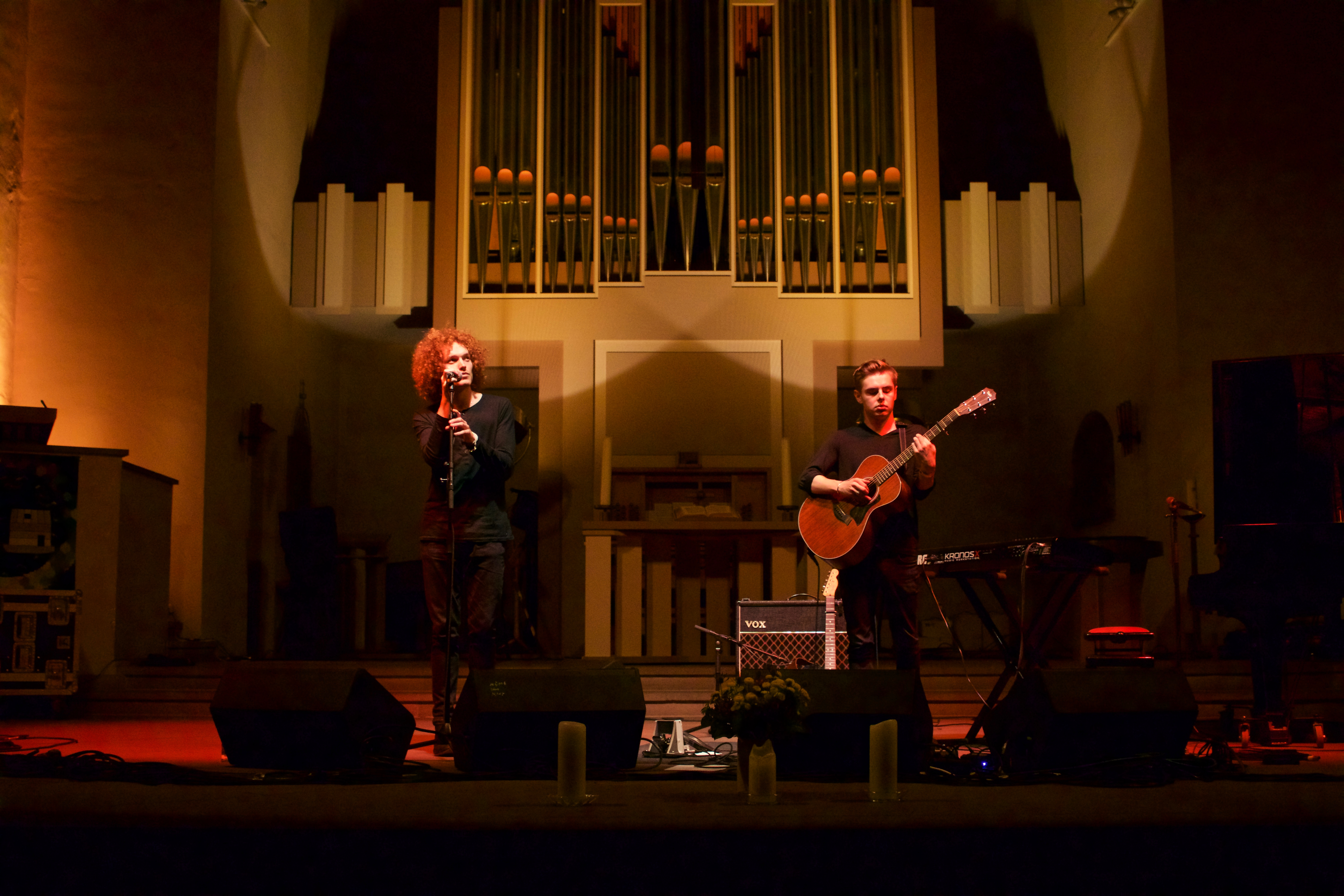
- Seafret at Way Back When Festival, 2016

Background information
- Origin: Bridlington, East Riding of Yorkshire, England
- Genres: Indie folk; Indie rock
- Years active: 2015–present
- Label: Columbia Records
- Members: Jack Sedman; Harry Draper
- Website: www.seafret.com

Seafret is an English rock duo consisting of singer Jack Sedman and guitarist Harry Draper, from Bridlington, East Riding of Yorkshire, England. Their debut studio album Tell Me It's Real peaked at No. 59 on the UK Albums Chart. They are known for their only international hit "Atlantis", which peaked at No. 38 on the UK Singles Chart.

== Career ==
The duo formed in 2011 after Jack Sedman and Harry Draper met at an open mic night near their hometown of Bridlington. They were impressed with each other's performances, and quickly decided to work together as musicians. They lived close to the coast, and the name of the band referenced both the mist that rolls in from the North Sea during the summer, and a pun on a guitar fretboard. After gaining some traction online in 2014, they moved to London. In September 2014, they released their debut EP, Give Me Something. They released their second EP, Oceans in January 2015. They released their debut single, "Atlantis" in May 2015. They released the single "Be There" in June 2015. In October 2015, they released a cover of Bring Me the Horizon's "Drown". They released the single, "Wildfire" in November 2015. In January 2016, they released their debut studio album, Tell Me It's Real. The album peaked at number 59 on the UK Albums Chart. They released their third EP, Acoustic Sessions in August 2016. They released the single "Blank You Out" in November 2016. They released the single "Can't Look Away" in July 2018. They released the single "Monsters" in August 2018. They released their fourth EP, Monsters in September 2018.

In 2022, a sped-up version of the band's debut single "Atlantis" gained popularity on TikTok. Following this, the duo released an official sped-up version of the song, leading to it charting across Europe and passing 400 million Spotify streams in total. The duo's monthly listener count on Spotify also increased to 13 million.

In January 2026, the duo announced that their new album, Fear of Emotion, would be released in March of that year. The announcement came alongside the release of a new song entitled "Signal Fire".

== Discography ==
=== Studio albums ===
Title	Details	Peak chart positions	
Title	Details	UK	SWI
Tell Me It's Real	Released: 29 January 2016; Label: Sweet Jane Recordings; Formats: Streaming, digital download, CD	59	100
Most of Us Are Strangers	Released: 13 March 2020; Label: Sweet Jane Recordings; Formats: Streaming, digital download, CD	—	—
Wonderland	Released: 14 April 2023; Label: Nettwerk Music Group; Formats: Streaming, digital download, CD	—	—
Fear of Emotion	Released: 27 March 2026; Label: Nettwerk; Formats: Streaming, digital download, CD		
"—" denotes a recording that did not chart or was not released.

=== Extended plays ===
Title	Details
Give Me Something	Released: 19 September 2014; Label: Sweet Jane Recordings; Formats: Digital download
Oceans	Released: 21 January 2015; Label: Sweet Jane Recordings; Formats: Digital download
Acoustic Sessions	Released: 5 August 2016; Label: Sweet Jane Recordings; Formats: Digital download
Monsters	Released: 7 September 2018; Label: Sweet Jane Recordings; Formats: Digital download
Piano Sessions	Released: 15 January 2021; Label: Nettwerk Music Group; Formats: Digital download
Anywhere from Here	Released: 7 October 2022; Label: Nettwerk Music Group; Formats: Digital download
Unwound Sessions	Released: 14 August 2026; Label: Nettwerk Music Group; Formats: Digital download

=== Singles ===
==== As lead artist ====
List of singles as lead artist, with selected chart positions
Title	Year	Peak chart positions								Certifications	Album
Title	Year	UK	AUS	CAN	IRE	NLD	SGP	SWE	WW	Certifications	Album
"Atlantis"	2015	38	76	98	97	60	17	78	140	BPI: Platinum; ARIA: Gold	Tell Me It's Real
"Be There"	2015	—	—	—	—	—	—	—	—		Tell Me It's Real
"Wildfire"	2015	—	—	—	—	—	—	—	—		Tell Me It's Real
"Blank You Out"	2016	—	—	—	—	—	—	—	—		Non-album single
"Can't Look Away"	2018	—	—	—	—	—	—	—	—		Monsters
"Monsters"	2018	—	—	—	—	—	—	—	—		Monsters
"Most of Us Are Strangers"	2020	—	—	—	—	—	—	—	—		Most of Us Are Strangers
"Cardigan"	2020	—	—	—	—	—	—	—	—		Non-album single
"Hollow"	2022	—	—	—	—	—	—	—	—		Anywhere from Here
"Pictures"	2022	—	—	—	—	—	—	—	—		Anywhere from Here
"Running Out of Love"	2022	—	—	—	—	—	—	—	—		Anywhere from Here
"See, I'm Sorry"	2023	—	—	—	—	—	—	—	—		Wonderland
"Remind Me to Forget You"	2023	—	—	—	—	—	—	—	—		Wonderland
"Wonderland"	2023	—	—	—	—	—	—	—	—		Wonderland
"Wait"	2025	—	—	—	—	—	—	—	—		Fear of Emotion
"Love in Reverse"	2025	—	—	—	—	—	—	—	—		Fear of Emotion
"Wasted on You"	2025	—	—	—	—	—	—	—	—		Fear of Emotion
"Cloud"	2025	—	—	—	—	—	—	—	—		Fear of Emotion
"Five More Seconds" (with KT Tunstall)	2025	—	—	—	—	—	—	—	—		Fear of Emotion
"Signal Fire"	2026	—	—	—	—	—	—	—	—		Fear of Emotion
"Driftwood" (with James Morrison)	2026	—	—	—	—	—	—	—	—		Fear of Emotion
"—" denotes a recording that did not chart or was not released.

==== Promotional singles ====
Title	Year	Album
"Drown"	2015	Non-album single
