= Elvis Ain't Dead =

2007 single by Scouting for Girls

Single by Scouting for Girls

from the album Scouting for Girls
- Released: 17 December 2007
- Genre: Pop rock
- Length: 3.50
- Label: Epic
- Songwriter(s): Scouting for Girls
- Producer(s): Andy Green

Scouting for Girls singles chronology
"She's So Lovely" (2007)	"Elvis Ain't Dead" (2007)	"Heartbeat" (2008)

"Elvis Ain't Dead" is a song by the British band Scouting for Girls. It was released as a single on 17 December 2007.

== Music video ==
The music video for "Elvis Ain't Dead" was recorded in a studio and involved the band members simply playing the song. There are shots of Roy Stride wandering around town and seeing people with Elvis haircuts and wearing the sorts of clothes he wore. At the end of the video he sees the girl that he is attracted to and the song fades with the words "Elvis has left the building. Thank you and goodnight!", a line made famous by Elvis.

== Chart performance ==
On 8 December 2007 "Elvis Ain’t Dead" debuted on the UK charts at number 91. Two weeks later on 22 December "Elvis Ain't Dead" entered the UK Top 40 at #33 in the UK Singles Chart via download sales alone. From then on, it slowly crept up the charts. It rose five places to #28 in its first week of physical release, then two places up to #26 the next week, climbed a further nine places to #17 in its third week and it then jumped another seven places to #10 in its fourth week, hence becoming the band's second UK Top 10 single. It rose two more places to its peak at #8 in its fifth week and sixth week. To date, the song has spent a total of 28 weeks on the UK Singles Chart, including chart re-entries.

=== Weekly charts ===
Chart (2007–2008)	Peak Position
Ireland (IRMA)	17
Scotland (OCC)	25
UK Singles (OCC)	8

=== Year-end charts ===
Chart (2008)	Position
UK Singles (OCC)	74

== Certifications ==
Region	Certification	Certified units/sales
United Kingdom (BPI)	Platinum	600,000^{‡}
^{‡} Sales+streaming figures based on certification alone.
