= Still Thinking About You =

Studio album by Scouting for Girls
- Released: 16 October 2015
- Recorded: 2015
- Genre: Pop
- Length: 35:32 (CD); 51:58 (itunes edition)
- Label: Out of Time Records, Warner Music
- Producer: Jon Maguire, Roy Stride, Andy Green

Scouting for Girls chronology
Greatest Hits (2013)	Still Thinking About You (2015)	The Very Best of Scouting for Girls – Ten Add Ten (2017)

Singles from Still Thinking About You
- 1. "Life's Too Short" Released: 21 August 2015; 2. "Christmas in the Air (Tonight)" Released: 20 November 2015; 3. "Home" Released: 18 March 2016

Still Thinking About You is the fourth studio album by the English band Scouting for Girls. It was released in the United Kingdom on 16 October 2015. The album includes the new singles "Life's Too Short" & "Christmas In the Air Tonight" .

== Singles ==
- "Life's Too Short" was released as the Lead single from the album on 21 August 2015.
- "Christmas in the Air (Tonight)" was released as the second single from the album on 20 November 2015.
- "Home" was the third single released from the album on 18 March 2016.

== Track listing ==
1. "Life's Too Short" – 2:52
2. "Still Thinking About You" – 3:29
3. "Castles" – 4:03
4. "Home" – 2:54
5. "My Vow" – 3:39
6. "Black and Blue" – 3:43
7. "Three Words Eight Letters" – 3:18
8. "Bad Superman" – 3:12
9. "Best Laid Plans" – 1:45
10. "Thank You and Goodnight" – 3:26
11. "Christmas in the Air (Tonight)" – 3:11

== itunes edition bonus tracks ==
- Footsteps – 3:37
- 5Am – 3:25
- The VW Campervan Summer Song – 3:15
- Bad Superman (acoustic) – 3:12
- Life's Too Short (acoustic) – 2:57

== Charts ==
Chart (2015)	Peak position
Scottish Albums (OCC)	20
UK Albums (OCC)	13

=== Personnel ===
- Roy Stride – guitar, piano, lead vocals
- Greg Churchouse – bass, backing vocals
- Pete Ellard – drums, percussion, backing vocals
