= Everybody Wants to Be on TV =

Studio album by Scouting for Girls
- Released: 12 April 2010
- Recorded: 2008–2009 at Helioscentric Studios, England
- Genre: Pop rock, indie pop, indie rock, piano rock
- Label: Epic
- Producer: Andy Green

Scouting for Girls chronology
| Scouting for Girls (2007) | Everybody Wants to Be on TV (2010) | The Light Between Us (2012) |

Singles from Everybody Wants to Be on TV
- 1. "This Ain't a Love Song" Released: 29 March 2010; 2. "Famous" Released: 18 July 2010; 3. "Don't Want to Leave You" Released: 10 October 2010; 4. "Take a Chance" Released: 10 December 2010

Alternative cover

Everybody Wants to Be on TV is the second studio album by the English band Scouting for Girls. It was released on 12 April 2010 through Epic. The first single on the album debuted on the Scott Mills BBC Radio 1 show on 15 January 2010. The album artwork was released on 19 January 2010. It is the second time that producer Andy Green has collaborated with Scouting for Girls to produce an album.

The album was to be re-released and include the single "Love How It Hurts", which was released on 10 July 2011, but the re-release was cancelled due to the band working on their third studio album The Light Between Us and the single was instead featured on that album.

== Recording ==
The album took over a year to initially write and prepare but, in summer 2009, Scouting for Girls began recording the final album and had completed it by autumn. Otis Spooge was dropped from the line up on account of his poor whistling on the previous album, although both parties have since said this was an amicable decision. They had the initial album written but scrapped it after the 2008 BRIT Awards when they decided it needed rewriting. On their official website, Roy Stride said:

We had the album written, but decided it just wasn't good enough so we trashed it and started over again. I just wanted to write the perfect pop song. We are perfectionists!

== Release ==
=== Singles ===
- "This Ain't a Love Song" is the first single from the album Everybody Wants to Be on TV. It was released on 28 March 2010 as a digital download, with the physical release the following day and debuted at number 1 on the UK Singles Chart on 4 April 2010, marking the band's most successful single to date.
- "Famous" is the second single from the album and was released as a digital download on 17 July 2010, with a CD released the following day, on 18 July 2010. The single was added to BBC Radio 1's B Playlist in June 2010. On 4 July 2010, it debuted on the UK Singles Chart at number 97.
- "Don't Want to Leave You", is the third single from the album and is the new name for "Silly Song". It was released digitally on 10 October and physical release on the following day."Don't Want To Leave You" is the third single by the English indie pop band Scouting for Girls to be released from their second studio album, Everybody Wants to Be on TV. The song was released as a digital download on 8 October 2010, with a CD released on 11 October 2010. It reached number 69 on the UK Singles Chart.
- "Take a Chance", is the fourth single from the album and is the official soundtrack of the Dutch movie Loft. It was released on 10 December, the music video was also released on that same day.
- "Love How It Hurts" was to be the fifth single from the album and was to feature on the re-release of the album, however, the re-release was cancelled and Love How It Hurts ended up serving as the lead single from Scouting For Girl's following album, The Light Between Us.

=== Promotion ===
Scouting For Girls first performed "Famous" to a "girl only" audience at Girlguiding UK's "Big Gig" at Wembley Arena, occurred before its official release on 18 October 2009 marking the centenary of Girlguiding UK. They performed the track "Famous" on 4 July 2010 at T4 On The Beach along with various other songs. They performed the track "Don't Want To Leave You" on 1 October 2010 on the 'National Lottery Euromillions Draw'.

The band released three music videos to accompany their singles, with the video for "Famous" releasing on 23 April 2010, "Don't Want To Leave You" releasing on 3 September 2010, and "This Ain't a Love Song" releasing in January 2011.

== Reception ==
Professional ratings
Aggregate scores
| Source | Rating |
|---|---|
| Metacritic | 47/100 |
Review scores
| Source | Rating |
| AllMusic | 3/5 stars |
| Dotmusic | 2/10 |
| Evening Standard | 4/5 stars |
| The Guardian | 2/5 stars |
| The Independent | 3/5 stars |
| musicOMH | 2/5 stars |
| NME | 0/10 |
| Q | 4/5 stars |
| Uncut | 6/10 |

Everybody Wants to Be on TV received mixed reviews garnering a score of 47/100 at aggregator website Metacritic.

== Track listing ==
All lyrics are written by Roy Stride; all music is composed by Roy Stride.

| No. | Title | Length |
|---|---|---|
| 1. | "This Ain't a Love Song" | 3:30 |
| 2. | "Little Miss Naughty" | 3:12 |
| 3. | "Goodtime Girl" | 3:13 |
| 4. | "Famous" | 2:35 |
| 5. | "Silly Song" (since renamed "Don't Want to Leave You") | 2:57 |
| 6. | "On the Radio" | 3:27 |
| 7. | "Blue as Your Eyes" | 3:42 |
| 8. | "Posh Girls" | 3:08 |
| 9. | "1+1" | 2:47 |
| 10. | "Take a Chance" | 5:19 |

iTunes bonus tracks
| No. | Title | Length |
|---|---|---|
| 11. | "A New Day" | 4:59 |
| 12. | "This Ain't a Love Song" (acoustic) | 3:32 |
| 13. | "Scouting for Girls TV" (video) | 9:13 |
| 14. | "This Ain't a Love Song" (video band edit) | 3:07 |
| 15. | "Everybody Wants to Be on TV" (digital booklet) |

== Charts and certifications ==
=== Weekly charts ===
| Album chart (2010) | Peak position |
|---|---|
| German Albums (Offizielle Top 100) | 45 |
| Irish Albums (IRMA) | 11 |
| Scottish Albums (OCC) | 2 |
| UK Albums (OCC) | 2 |

| "Don't Want to Leave You" (2010) | Peak position |
|---|---|
| Scotland Singles (OCC) | 72 |
| UK Singles (OCC) | 69 |

| "Famous" (2010) | Peak position |
|---|---|
| Scotland Singles (OCC) | 24 |
| Switzerland Airplay (Schweizer Hitparade) | 77 |
| UK Singles (OCC) | 37 |

=== Year-end charts ===
| Album chart (2010) | Position |
|---|---|
| UK Albums (OCC) | 58 |

=== Certifications ===
| Region | Certification | Certified units/sales |
|---|---|---|
| United Kingdom (BPI) | Platinum | 300,000^{‡} |
^{‡} Sales+streaming figures based on certification alone.

== Personnel ==
=== Personnel ===
Band

- Roy Stride – guitar, piano, lead vocals
- Greg Churchouse – bass, backing vocals
- Pete Ellard – drums, percussion

=== Technical credits ===
Production

- Andy Green – producer, mixing engineer
- Julian Willmott – audio engineer
- Ted Jenson – mastering

Artwork

- Lisa Peardon; Dean Chalky; Ellis Parrinder; Lisa Gold – photography
- Fern's Dad – Artwork
