= The Light Between Us =

Studio album by Scouting for Girls
- Released: 31 August 2012
- Recorded: 2011–2012
- Genre: Pop
- Length: 37:24
- Label: Epic

Scouting for Girls chronology
Everybody Wants to Be on TV (2010)	The Light Between Us (2012)	Greatest Hits (2013)

Singles from The Light Between Us
- 1. "Love How It Hurts" Released: 8 July 2011; 2. "Summertime In the City" Released: 26 August 2012; 3. "Without You" Released: 15 October 2012

The Light Between Us is the third studio album by the English band Scouting for Girls. It was released in the United Kingdom on 31 August 2012. The album includes the singles "Love How It Hurts" and "Summertime In the City".

== Singles ==
- "Love How It Hurts" was released as the lead single from the album on 8 July 2011. The song peaked to number 17 on the UK Singles Chart. The song was originally intended to be released off the re-release of their second album, Everybody Wants to Be on TV.
- "Summertime In the City" was released as the second single from the album on 26 August 2012. The song peaked to number 73 on the UK Singles Chart.
- "Without You" was released as the third single from the album on 15 October 2012.

== Track listing ==
Standard edition
No.	Title	Length
1.	"Without You"	4:05
2.	"Summertime In the City"	3:06
3.	"Love How It Hurts"	3:08
4.	"Downtempo"	3:07
5.	"Snakes and Ladders"	4:15
6.	"Six Degrees"	3:58
7.	"Rains in L.A."	3:17
8.	"Rocky Balboa"	3:09
9.	"Somebody New"	3:02
10.	"The Light Between Us"	1:24
11.	"Make This One Last"	4:53

Deluxe Version
No.	Title	Length
12.	"Just What I've Been Looking For"	3:02
13.	"You Can't Ever Have Too Much Fun" (Sleep Baby Sleep)	3:55
14.	"Mr Sunshine" (She Can Drive You Crazy)	3:29
15.	"This Ain't a Love Song" (BBC Live Version)	3:12
16.	"Summertime In the City" (Live Acoustic)	4:11

== Charts and certifications ==
=== Weekly charts ===
Album chart (2012)	Peak position
Scottish Albums (OCC)	15
UK Albums (OCC)	10

"Summertime In the City" (2012)	Peak position
Scotland (OCC)	56
UK Singles (OCC)	73

"Love How It Hurts" (2011)	Peak position
Scotland (OCC)	16
Switzerland Airplay (Schweizer Hitparade)	66
UK Singles (OCC)	17

=== Certifications ===
"Love How It Hurts"
Region	Certification	Certified units/sales
United Kingdom (BPI)	Silver	200,000^{‡}
^{‡} Sales+streaming figures based on certification alone.

== Release history ==
Region	Release date	Format	Label
United Kingdom	31 August 2012	Digital Download	Epic
