= Heartbeat (Scouting for Girls song) =

2008 single by Scouting for Girls

Single by Scouting for Girls

from the album Scouting for Girls
- Released: 7 April 2008
- Genre: Pop rock
- Length: 2:55
- Label: Epic; Sony BMG
- Songwriter(s): Scouting for Girls
- Producer(s): Andy Green

Scouting for Girls singles chronology
"Elvis Ain't Dead" (2007)	"Heartbeat" (2008)	"It's Not About You" (2008)

Music video
- "Heartbeat" on YouTube

"Heartbeat" is a song by British band Scouting For Girls and the third single taken from their self-titled debut album. Its physical release was on 7 April 2008 and it peaked at number 10 on the UK Singles Chart and number 17 in Ireland. It was nominated for Best British Single at the 2009 BRIT Awards.

== Critical reception ==
The song was on the 10-song shortlist for Best British Single at the 2009 BRIT Awards. It was voted into the top five songs which would compete for the award. The other nominees were Duffy's "Mercy", Coldplay's "Viva la Vida", Leona Lewis's "Better in Time" and Girls Aloud's "The Promise". "The Promise" eventually took the award.

== Music video ==
In the music video the band is seen playing at a lovers ball in front of young couples. Those who have love (or lust) for others are shown to have beating CGI hearts.

== Track listing ==
UK CD single

1. "Heartbeat"
2. "A Level Pain"

== Charts ==
=== Weekly charts ===
Chart (2008)	Peak position
Ireland (IRMA)	17
Scotland (OCC)	35
UK Singles (OCC)	10

=== Year-end charts ===
Chart (2008)	Position
UK Singles (OCC)	77

== Certifications ==
Region	Certification	Certified units/sales
United Kingdom (BPI)	Platinum	600,000^{‡}
^{‡} Sales+streaming figures based on certification alone.
