= Scouting for Girls (album) =

2007 studio album by Scouting For Girls

Studio album by Scouting for Girls
- Released: 17 September 2007
- Genre: Pop rock
- Label: Epic
- Producer: Andy Green

Scouting for Girls chronology
Scouting for Girls (2007)	Everybody Wants to Be on TV (2010)

Singles from Scouting for Girls
- 1. "It's Not About You" Released: 25 June 2007; 2. "She's So Lovely" Released: 27 August 2007; 3. "Elvis Ain't Dead" Released: 17 December 2007; 4. "Heartbeat" Released: 7 April 2008; 5. "It's Not About You Re-Release" Released: 4 August 2008; 6. "I Wish I Was James Bond" Released: 3 November 2008; 7. "Keep on Walking" Released: 9 March 2009

Professional ratings
Review scores
Source	Rating
Allmusic	3/5 stars
Drowned in Sound	1/10 stars
NME	2/10 stars

Scouting for Girls is the debut album by London-based indie pop group Scouting For Girls. It was released on 17 September 2007 and has been certified 3 times platinum in the United Kingdom since its release. It contains the hit singles "She's So Lovely" and "Elvis Ain't Dead" as well as their song "It's Not About You", which was only released as a limited-copy EP in June 2007. The album had a two-week run as the UK Album Chart 'Number 1 album' on 20 January 2008 after taking over from Amy Macdonald's debut album This Is The Life. It was replaced on 3 February 2008 by Adele's debut album 19.

== Singles ==
- "It's Not About You" was released as the first single on 25 June 2007. It peaked at #31 on the UK Singles Chart.
- "She's So Lovely" was released as the second single on 27 August 2007. It peaked at #7 on the UK Singles Chart as the most successful single on the album.
- "Elvis Ain't Dead" was released as the third single on 17 December 2007. It peaked at #8 on the UK Singles Chart.
- "Heartbeat" was released as the fourth single on 7 April 2008. It peaked at #10 on the UK Singles Chart.
- "I Wish I Was James Bond" was released as the fifth single on 7 November 2008. It peaked at #40 on the UK Singles Chart.
- "Keep on Walking" was originally released on the eponymous EP as the band's debut in Australia. The single charted at number 198 on the UK Singles Chart. As their single for the full-length debut album, "Keep on Walking" was initially set for release as the fifth single, yet instead it was released as a promotional single on 9 March 2009. It peaked at #78 on the UK Singles Chart. It was featured on BBC Radio 1's C-List. The music video for "Keep on Walking" consists of various clips of the band on tour, released on their official YouTube on 9 February 2009.

== Track listing ==
All tracks are written by Roy Stride.

No.	Title	Length
1.	"Keep on Walking"	3:37
2.	"She's So Lovely"	3:43
3.	"It's Not About You"	4:12
4.	"The Aeroplane Song"	4:20
5.	"Heartbeat"	2:55
6.	"Elvis Ain't Dead"	3:49
7.	"I'm Not Over You"	3:24
8.	"I Need a Holiday"	3:21
9.	"The Mountains of Navaho"	3:21
10.	"James Bond"	3:15

=== Bonus tracks ===
All tracks are written by Roy Stride.

iTunes version
No.	Title	Length
11.	"Michaela Strachan You Broke My Heart (When I Was 12)" (Begins 3 minutes 47 seconds into the song "James Bond" on the standard album)	3:09

== Chart performance ==
When it was first released in September 2007, Scouting for Girls debuted at No.12. The next week it fell down 8 places and then fell out of the top 40 in October 2007. It started to climb back up the chart in January 2008 until it reached its new peak of No.4 on 13 January. The next week it climbed to No.1 after 18 weeks of falling and climbing then it remained there for two weeks.

On 28 December 2008, it was announced as the 10th biggest selling album of 2008 after 60 weeks on the chart. The album has sold 952,303 copies as of October 2015.

== Charts ==
=== Weekly charts ===
Album chart (2007–2008)	Peak position
Irish Albums (IRMA)	11
Scottish Albums (Official Charts)	2
UK Albums (Official Charts)	1

"I Wish I Was James Bond" (2008)	Peak position
Scottish Singles Sales (Official Charts)	40
UK Singles (Official Charts)	40

"It's Not About You" (2007-2008)	Peak Position
Scottish Singles Sales (Official Charts)	33
UK Singles (Official Charts)	31

"Keep On Walking" (2008)	Peak Position
United Kingdom (Official Charts Company)	198

=== Year-end charts ===
Album chart (2007)	Position
UK Albums (OCC)	104
Chart (2008)	Position
UK Albums (OCC)	10
Chart (2009)	Position
UK Albums (OCC)	195

== Certifications ==
Album
Region	Certification	Certified units/sales
Ireland (IRMA)	Platinum	15,000^{^}
United Kingdom (BPI)	3× Platinum	900,000^{^}
^{^} Shipments figures based on certification alone.

"I Wish I Was James Bond"
Region	Certification	Certified units/sales
United Kingdom (BPI)	Silver	200,000^{‡}
^{‡} Sales+streaming figures based on certification alone.

== Personnel ==
Scouting for Girls

- Greg Churchhouse - Bass, Guitar, Vocals
- Peter Ellard - Drums, Percussion, Vocals
- Roy Stride - Piano, Guitar, Vocals

Additional musicians

- James McMillan - Trumpet on "She's So Lovely" and "The Mountains of Navaho"
- Martin Owen - Horn on "Elvis Ain't Dead", "I Need a Holiday", "The Mountains of Navaho" and "Michaela Strachan"

Production

- Andy Green - Producer, Engineer, Programming, Mixing
- Julian Wilmott - Additional Engineer, Pro Tools Engineer
- Ted Janson - Mastering
