= List of awards and nominations received by DJ Khaled =

DJ Khaled awards and nominations
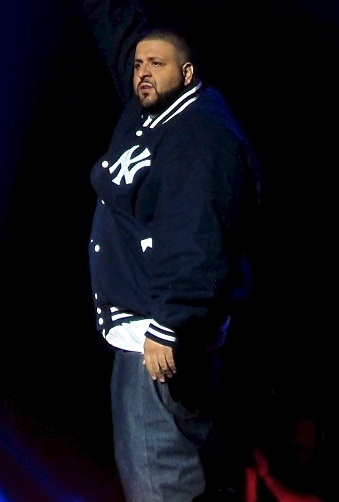
- DJ Khaled in 2011
Awards and nominations
Award	Wins	Nominations
American Music Awards	1	2
BET Awards	2	14
BET Hip Hop Awards	13	48
Grammy Awards	1	10
MTV Europe Music Awards	1	3
MTV VMs	1	15
BBC Music Awards	1	10

Totals (Note: Certain award groups do not simply award one winner. They acknowledge several different recipients, have runners-up, and have third place. Since this is a specific recognition and is different from losing an award, runner-up mentions are considered wins in this award tally. For simplification and to avoid errors, each award in this list has been presumed to have had a prior nomination.)
- Wins: 20
- Nominations: 133

This is a list of awards and nominations received by American DJ and record producer DJ Khaled. Grammy Award-winner, DJ Khaled has earned numerous awards throughout his career, being mentioned in major international award ceremonies, winning 13 BET Hip Hop Awards, 2 BET Awards, one Soul Train Music Awards and both one MTV Video Music Awards and MTV Europe Music Awards. Awarded 1 iHeartRadio Music Awards along with the accomplishment of reaching 1 Billion Total Audience Spins for "Wild Thoughts" featuring Rihanna and Bryson Tiller.

== Awards and nominations ==
Award	Year	Work	Category	Result	Ref.
American Music Awards	2017	"I'm the One" (featuring Justin Bieber, Quavo, Chance the Rapper & Lil Wayne)	Favorite Rap/Hip-Hop Song	Won	
American Music Awards	2017	"I'm the One" (featuring Justin Bieber, Quavo, Chance the Rapper & Lil Wayne)	Collaboration of the Year	Nominated	
ASCAP Rhythm and Soul Music Awards	2016	"Hold You Down" (featuring Chris Brown, August Alsina, Future & Jeremih)	Award Winning R&B/Hip-Hop Songs	Won	
ASCAP Rhythm and Soul Music Awards	2016	"How Many Times" (featuring Chris Brown, August Alsina, Future & Jeremih)	Award Winning R&B/Hip-Hop Songs	Won	
ASCAP Rhythm and Soul Music Awards	2017	"I Got the Keys" (featuring Jay-Z & Future)	Award Winning R&B/Hip-Hop Songs	Won	
ASCAP Rhythm and Soul Music Awards	2017	"For Free" (featuring Drake)	Award Winning R&B/Hip-Hop Songs	Won	
ASCAP Rhythm and Soul Music Awards	2017	"For Free" (featuring Drake)	Award Winning Rap Songs	Won	
Billboard Music Awards	2017	"Major Key"	Top Rap Album	Nominated	
Billboard Music Awards	2018	"I'm the One" (featuring Justin Bieber, Quavo, Chance the Rapper and Lil Wayne)	Top Rap Song	Nominated	
Billboard Music Awards	2018	"Wild Thoughts" (with Rihanna & Bryson Tiller)	Top R&B Song	Nominated	
Billboard Music Awards	2019	"No Brainer" (with Justin Bieber, Quavo, Chance the Rapper)	Top R&B Song	Nominated	
Billboard Latin Music Awards	2022	Himself	Crossover Artist of the Year	Nominated	
BET Awards	2008	"I'm So Hood (Remix)" (with Young Jeezy, Ludacris, Busta Rhymes, Big Boi, Lil Wayne, Fat Joe, Birdman, & Rick Ross)	Best Collaboration	Nominated	
BET Awards	2012	"I'm on One" (feat. Drake, Lil Wayne, Rick Ross)	Best Collaboration	Nominated	
BET Awards	2017	"Shining" (feat. Jay-Z & Beyoncé)	Best Collaboration	Nominated	
BET Awards	2018	"Top Off" (feat. Jay-Z, Future & Beyoncé)	Best Collaboration	Nominated	
BET Awards	2018	"Top Off" (feat. Jay-Z, Future & Beyoncé)	Best Collaboration	Nominated	
BET Awards	2018	"Wild Thoughts" (feat.Rihanna & Bryson Tiller)	Best Collaboration	Won	
BET Awards	2018	"Wild Thoughts" (feat.Rihanna & Bryson Tiller)	Video of the Year	Nominated	
BET Awards	2018	"Wild Thoughts" (feat.Rihanna & Bryson Tiller)	Coca-Cola Viewers' Choice Award	Nominated	
BET Awards	2018	Grateful	Album of the Year	Nominated	
BET Awards	2018	Himself	Best Male Hip Hop Artist	Nominated	
BET Awards	2020	"Higher" (feat. John Legend & Nipsey Hussle)	Best Collaboration	Nominated	
BET Awards	2020	"Higher" (feat. John Legend & Nipsey Hussle)	Video of the Year	Won	
BET Awards	2021	"Popstar" (feat. Drake)	Viewer's Choice	Nominated	
BET Awards	2021	"Popstar" (feat. Drake)	Best Collaboration	Nominated	
BET Awards	2022	"Every Chance I Get" (feat. Lil Baby and Lil Durk)	Best Collaboration	Nominated	
BET Hip Hop Awards	2007	"We Takin' Over" (with Akon, T.I., Rick Ross, Fat Joe, Birdman, & Lil Wayne)	Best Hip-Hop Collabo	Nominated	
BET Hip Hop Awards	2007	"We Takin' Over" (with Akon, T.I., Rick Ross, Fat Joe, Birdman, & Lil Wayne)	People's Champ Award	Nominated	
BET Hip Hop Awards	2008	"I'm So Hood (Remix)" (with Young Jeezy, Ludacris, Busta Rhymes, Big Boi, Lil Wayne, Fat Joe, Birdman, & Rick Ross)	Best Collaboration	Won	
BET Hip Hop Awards	2008	Himself	MVP of the Year	Won	
BET Hip Hop Awards	2008	Himself	DJ of the Year	Nominated	
BET Hip Hop Awards	2009	Himself	DJ of the Year	Nominated	
BET Hip Hop Awards	2010	Himself	DJ of the Year	Won	
BET Hip Hop Awards	2010	"All I Do Is Win (Remix)" (feat. Rick Ross, T-Pain, Busta Rhymes, P. Diddy, Fabolous, Fat Joe, Jadakiss & Nicki Minaj)	Reese's Perfect Combo Award	Nominated	
BET Hip Hop Awards	2010	"All I Do Is Win" (feat. T-Pain, Ludacris, Rick Ross & Snoop Dogg)	Best Club Banger	Nominated	
BET Hip Hop Awards	2011	"I'm on One" (feat. Drake, Rick Ross and Lil Wayne)	Best Club Banger	Nominated	
BET Hip Hop Awards	2011	"I'm on One" (feat. Drake, Rick Ross and Lil Wayne)	Reese's Perfect Combo Award (Best Collab)	Nominated	
BET Hip Hop Awards	2011	"I'm on One" (feat. Drake, Rick Ross and Lil Wayne)	Best Hip Hop Video	Nominated	
BET Hip Hop Awards	2011	Himself	DJ of the Year	Won	
BET Hip Hop Awards	2012	Himself	DJ of the Year	Won	
BET Hip Hop Awards	2013	Himself	DJ of the Year	Nominated	
BET Hip Hop Awards	2014	Himself	DJ of the Year	Nominated	
BET Hip Hop Awards	2015	Himself	DJ of the Year	Nominated	
BET Hip Hop Awards	2016	Himself	DJ of the Year	Won	
BET Hip Hop Awards	2016	Himself	MVP of the Year	Won	
BET Hip Hop Awards	2016	Himself	Hustler of the Year	Won	
BET Hip Hop Awards	2016	"I Got the Keys" (feat. Jay Z & Future)	Best Hip Hop Video	Nominated	
BET Hip Hop Awards	2016	"I Got the Keys" (feat. Jay Z & Future)	Best Collabo, Duo or Group	Nominated	
BET Hip Hop Awards	2016	"For Free" (feat. Drake)	Best Collabo, Duo or Group	Nominated	
BET Hip Hop Awards	2016	"For Free" (feat. Drake)	People's Champ Award	Nominated	
BET Hip Hop Awards	2016	I Changed a Lot	Album of the Year	Nominated	
BET Hip Hop Awards	2017	Grateful	Album of the Year	Nominated	
BET Hip Hop Awards	2017	Himself	DJ of the Year	Won	
BET Hip Hop Awards	2017	Himself	Producer of the Year	Nominated	
BET Hip Hop Awards	2017	Himself	MVP of the Year	Won	
BET Hip Hop Awards	2017	Himself	Hustler of the Year	Nominated	
BET Hip Hop Awards	2017	"Wild Thoughts" (feat. Rihanna & Bryson Tiller)	Best Hip Hop Video	Nominated	
BET Hip Hop Awards	2017	"Wild Thoughts" (feat. Rihanna & Bryson Tiller)	Best Collabo, Duo or Group	Won	
BET Hip Hop Awards	2017	"Wild Thoughts" (feat. Rihanna & Bryson Tiller)	Single of the Year	Nominated	
BET Hip Hop Awards	2018	Himself	Hustler of the Year	Nominated	
BET Hip Hop Awards	2018	Himself	DJ of the Year	Won	
BET Hip Hop Awards	2019	Himself	MVP of the Year	Nominated	
BET Hip Hop Awards	2019	Himself	DJ of the Year	Nominated	
BET Hip Hop Awards	2019	Himself	Producer of the Year	Won	
BET Hip Hop Awards	2019	Himself	Hustler of the Year	Nominated	
BET Hip Hop Awards	2019	Himself	Best Hip-Hop Style	Nominated	
BET Hip Hop Awards	2019	Father of Asahd	Album of the Year	Nominated	
BET Hip Hop Awards	2019	"Higher" (feat. Nipsey Hussle & John Legend)	Best Collab, Duo or Group	Nominated	
BET Hip Hop Awards	2020	Himself	Hustler of the Year	Nominated	
BET Hip Hop Awards	2020	Himself	DJ of the Year	Nominated	
BET Hip Hop Awards	2020	Himself	Producer of the Year	Nominated	
BET Hip Hop Awards	2021	Himself	Producer of the Year	Nominated	
BET Hip Hop Awards	2021	"Every Chance I Get" (feat. Lil Durk & Lil Baby)	Best Collaboration	Nominated	
BET Hip Hop Awards	2021	Khaled Khaled	Album of the Year	Nominated	
BRIT Awards	2018	Himself	International Male Solo Artist	Nominated	
GAFFA Awards (Denmark)	2018	Grateful	International Album of the Year	Nominated	
GAFFA Awards (Denmark)	2018	Wild Thoughts (featuring Rihanna)	International Hit of the Year	Nominated	
GAFFA Awards (Denmark)	2018	"I'm the One" (featuring Justin Bieber, Quavo, Chance the Rapper and Lil Wayne)	International Hit of the Year	Nominated	
Gaygalan Awards	2018	"Wild Thoughts" (featuring Rihanna)	International Song of the Year	Nominated	
Grammy Awards	2012	"I'm on One" (feat. Drake, Lil Wayne, Rick Ross)	Best Rap/Sung Collaboration	Nominated	
Grammy Awards	2017	Major Key	Best Rap Album	Nominated	
Grammy Awards	2020	"Higher" (feat. John Legend & Nipsey Hussle)	Best Rap/Sung Performance	Won	
Grammy Awards	2022	Back of My Mind (as a producer)	Album of the Year	Nominated	
Grammy Awards	2023	Good Morning Gorgeous (Deluxe) (as a producer)	Album of the Year	Nominated	
Grammy Awards	2023	"God Did" (featuring Rick Ross, Lil Wayne, Jay-Z, John Legend & Fridayy)	Song of the Year	Nominated	
Grammy Awards	2023	"God Did" (featuring Rick Ross, Lil Wayne, Jay-Z, John Legend & Fridayy)	Best Rap Performance	Nominated	
Grammy Awards	2023	"God Did" (featuring Rick Ross, Lil Wayne, Jay-Z, John Legend & Fridayy)	Best Rap Song	Nominated	
Grammy Awards	2023	"Beautiful" (featuring Future & SZA)	Best Melodic Rap Performance	Nominated	
Grammy Awards	2023	God Did	Best Rap Album	Nominated	
iHeartRadio Music Awards	2017	"For Free" (feat. Drake)	Hip-Hop Song of the Year	Nominated	
iHeartRadio Music Awards	2017	Himself	Hip-Hop Artist of the Year	Nominated	
iHeartRadio Music Awards	2018	"Wild Thoughts" (feat. Rihanna & Bryson Tiller)	Song of the Year	Nominated	
iHeartRadio Music Awards	2018	"Wild Thoughts" (feat. Rihanna & Bryson Tiller)	Collaboration of the Year	Nominated	
iHeartRadio Music Awards	2018	"Wild Thoughts" (feat. Rihanna & Bryson Tiller)	Hip-Hop Song of the Year	Won	
iHeartRadio Music Awards	2018	"I'm the One" (featuring Justin Bieber, Quavo, Chance the Rapper and Lil Wayne)	Best Video of the Year	Nominated	
iHeartRadio Music Awards	2018	Himself	Hip-Hop Artist of the Year	Nominated	
iHeartRadio Titanium Awards	2017	"Wild Thoughts" (feat. Rihanna & Bryson Tiller)	1 Billion Total Audience Spins on iHeartRadio Stations	Won	
MOBO Awards	2016	Himself	Best International Act	Nominated	
MOBO Awards	2017	Himself	Best International Act	Nominated	
MTV Africa Music Awards	2021	Himself	International act	Nominated	
MTV Europe Music Awards	2017	"Wild Thoughts" (feat. Rihanna & Bryson Tiller)	Best Song	Nominated	
MTV Europe Music Awards	2017	DJ Khaled	Best US Act	Nominated	
MTV Europe Music Awards	2020	"Popstar" (feat. Drake)	Best Video	Won	
MTV Video Music Awards	2017	"Wild Thoughts" (featuring Rihanna & Bryson Tiller)	Video of the Year	Nominated	
MTV Video Music Awards	2017	"Wild Thoughts" (featuring Rihanna & Bryson Tiller)	Best Collaboration	Nominated	
MTV Video Music Awards	2017	"Wild Thoughts" (featuring Rihanna & Bryson Tiller)	Best Art Direction	Nominated	
MTV Video Music Awards	2017	"Wild Thoughts" (featuring Rihanna & Bryson Tiller)	Song of Summer	Nominated	
MTV Video Music Awards	2017	"I'm the One" (featuring Justin Bieber, Quavo, Chance the Rapper & Lil Wayne)	Best Hip Hop	Nominated	
MTV Video Music Awards	2018	"Dinero" (with Jennifer Lopez and Cardi B)	Best Collaboration	Won	
MTV Video Music Awards	2018	"Dinero" (with Jennifer Lopez and Cardi B)	Best Latin	Nominated	
MTV Video Music Awards	2018	"No Brainer" (featuring Justin Bieber, Chance the Rapper and Quavo)	Song of Summer	Nominated	
MTV Video Music Awards	2019	"Higher" (featuring Nipsey Hussle and John Legend)	Best Hip Hop	Nominated	
MTV Video Music Awards	2019	"Just Us" (featuring SZA)	Best Visual Effects	Nominated	
MTV Video Music Awards	2019	"Wish Wish" (featuring Cardi B and 21 Savage)	Best Power Anthem	Nominated	
MTV Video Music Awards	2020	"Popstar" (featuring Drake)	Song of Summer	Nominated	
MTV Video Music Awards	2021	"Popstar" (featuring Drake)	Video of the Year	Nominated	
MTV Video Music Awards	2021	"Popstar" (featuring Drake)	Best Direction	Nominated	
MTV Video Music Awards	2021	"Every Chance I Get" (feat. Lil Baby and Lil Durk)	Song of Summer	Nominated	
MTV Video Music Awards	2023	"Staying Alive" (featuring Drake and Lil Baby)	Best Hip-Hop	Nominated	
Ozone Awards	2007	Himself	Best Radio DJ	Won	
Ozone Awards	2007	"We Takin' Over"	Best Video	Won	
Ozone Awards	2008	Himself	DJ of the Year	Won	'
Soul Train Music Awards	2016	Major Key	Album/Mixtape of the Year	Nominated	
Soul Train Music Awards	2016	"For Free" (feat. Drake)	Best Hip-Hop Song of the Year	Nominated	
Soul Train Music Awards	2016	"For Free" (feat. Drake)	Best Collaboration	Nominated	
Soul Train Music Awards	2017	"Wild Thoughts" (feat. Rihanna & Bryson Tiller)	Video of the Year	Nominated	
Soul Train Music Awards	2017	"Wild Thoughts" (feat. Rihanna & Bryson Tiller)	Best Hip-Hop Song of the Year	Nominated	
Soul Train Music Awards	2017	"Wild Thoughts" (feat. Rihanna & Bryson Tiller)	Song of the Year	Nominated	
Soul Train Music Awards	2017	"Wild Thoughts" (feat. Rihanna & Bryson Tiller)	Best Dance Performance	Nominated	
Soul Train Music Awards	2017	"Wild Thoughts" (feat. Rihanna & Bryson Tiller)	Best Collaboration	Won	
Soul Train Music Awards	2018	"No Brainer" (feat. Justin Bieber, Chance the Rapper and Quavo)	Rhythm & Bars Award	Nominated	
Soul Train Music Awards	2020	"Popstar" (feat. Drake)	Rhythm & Bars Award	Nominated	
Teen Choice Awards	2016	Himself	Choice Snapchatter	Nominated	
Teen Choice Awards	2017	Himself	Choice Snapchatter	Nominated	
Teen Choice Awards	2017	"I'm the One" (featuring Justin Bieber, Quavo, Chance the Rapper and Lil Wayne)	Choice R&B/Hip-Hop Song	Won	
Teen Choice Awards	2018	The Four: Battle for Stardom	Choice TV Personality	Nominated	
Teen Choice Awards	2018	"Dinero" (with Jennifer Lopez & Cardi B)	Choice Latin Song	Nominated	
Teen Choice Awards	2019	Himself	Choice Summer Male Artist	Nominated	
Urban Music Awards	2017	Himself	Best International Act	Won	
Urban Music Awards	2017	Himself	Artist of the Year (USA)	Nominated	
