= Nova Wav =

American record production and songwriting duo

- Genres: Hip hop; R&B; pop
- Years active: 2012–present
- Label: Warner Chappell Music
- Members: Brittany "Chi" Coney; Denisia "Blu June" Andrews
- Website: https://novawav.com

Nova Wav is a record production and songwriting duo composed of Brittany "Chi" Coney and Denisia "Blu June" Andrews. Over the course of their career, Nova Wav has written and produced on tracks and albums for artists including Beyoncé, Rihanna, DJ Khaled, Ariana Grande, Jay-Z, Saweetie, Nicki Minaj, Teyana Taylor, Kehlani and more. They were signed to Warner Chappell Music by Ryan Press and "Big Jon" Platt. They were named Billboards 2018 R&B/Hip-Hop 100 Power Players and listed on Revolt's Top 9 producers of 2019 that demanded the sound of Hip Hop and R&B.

== Members ==
Blu June was born in Fort Lauderdale, Florida and raised in Tallahassee, Florida. Chi is a native of Plant City, Florida.

== Career ==
Blu June and Chi formed the duo Nova Wav in Atlanta, Georgia back in 2011, and received their first placement of their professional career in 2012 co-writing "Loveeeeeee Song" by Rihanna featuring Future. Following the release of Unapologetic, "Loveeeeeee Song" entered the US Billboard Hot 100 at number 100. It ascended to 88 its second week and to 63 in its third week. It additionally debuted at number 14 on the US Hot R&B/Hip-Hop Songs due to strong digital downloads. The song has also peaked at 4 on the Hot R&B/Hip-Hop Airplay chart. On February 21, 2018 Unapologetic was announced 3x Multi-Platinum by the Recording Industry Association of America (RIAA).

In 2014, Nova Wav wrote "Best Mistake" with American recording artist Ariana Grande that features American hip hop recording artist Big Sean and produced by Key Wane. The song was released August 12, 2014 becoming the promotional single for Grande's second studio album, My Everything The album was later announced 2× Multi-Platinum by RIAA on March 22, 2016.

In 2016, Nova Wav teamed up with American singer and songwriter Kehlani to produce and write her lead single "CRZY", which was later released on her studio album SweetSexySavage under Atlantic Records. On February 13, 2019 the record hit over one million copies sold making it Kehlani's first ever Certified Platinum record The single peaked on Billboard Hot 100 at number 85, Mainstream R&B/Hip Hop Charts at number 17, and Hot R&B songs at number 11 on November 26, 2016.

In 2018, the duo won their first GRAMMY Award for co-writing and producing "LoveHappy" and co-writing "Nice", "Friends", and "Black Effect", on The Carters album Everything Is Love which was released on June 16, 2018, by Parkwood Entertainment, Sony Music Entertainment, S.C Enterprises, and Roc Nation. Also that year, they worked alongside Dj Khaled and co-wrote the records "Top Off", "You Stay", "Holy Mountain" and "Just Us" in addition to co-writing and co-producing "Jealous" on his eleventh studio album Father of Asahd which released May 17, 2019, through We the Best Music and Epic Records. The leading single "Top Off" was released on March 2, 2018 selling over 500,000 copies becoming Certified Gold on September 21, 2018. On June 17, 2019, the album Father of Asahd was Certified Gold by the Recording Industry Association of America (RIAA) for combined sales and album-equivalent units of over 500,000 units in the United States.

In 2019, Nova Wav co-wrote the record "Me + You" and "Commitment" for American R&B singer Monica for her ninth studio album, Chapter 38. "Commitment" hit number 1 on Billboard Adult R&B Songs earning Monica her fourth number 1 record in over 10 years, and became the first single on her label, Mondeenise Music.

In 2020, Nova Wav co-wrote Beyoncé's charity single "Black Parade." It was the most nominated song at the 63rd Annual Grammy Awards, with four nominations including Record of the Year and Song of the Year. The song won Best R&B Performance.

In 2022, Nova Wav won their next Grammy Award for Best R&B Performance for their work on Jazmine Sullivan's "Pick Up Your Feelings". Later that year, the duo co-wrote 8 out 16 songs on Beyoncé's album Renaissance.

In 2025, Nova Wav appeared on the Netflix music docu-reality series Hitmakers.

== Discography ==
Year	Title	Album	Artist(s)
2025	"Best Behavior" (featuring Lil Baby)	Sex Hysteria	Jessie Murph
2025	"Yippee-Ki-Yay" (featuring T-Pain)	Period	Kesha
2025	"Weigh Me Down"	We Need to Talk: Love	Keri Hilson
2025	"Bliss"	TBA	Tyla
2025	"Bed of Roses"	Escape Room	Teyana Taylor
2024	"Jolene"	Cowboy Carter	Beyoncé
2024	"Finally"	The Color Purple	Jorja Smith
2024	"Keep It Movin'"	The Color Purple	Halle Bailey
2024	"7Days7Nights"	After 7	Lay Bankz
2024	"Paradise"(featuring Dj Khaled and Anitta)	No-album Single	Fat Joe
2024	"Trustworthy (Interlude)"	Access All Areas: Unlocked	FLO (group)
2024	"Can't Wait For You"	Gratitude	Mary J. Blige
2023	"Feel Me Cry"	In Pieces	Chlöe
2023	"What's Love" (with Nova Wav)	The Love Album: Off The Grid	Diddy
2023	"Mind Your Business" with Kehlani and Ty Dolla Sign	The Love Album: Off The Grid	Diddy
2023	"Homicide" (featuring Jessie Reyez)	Non-album single	6lack
2023	"Emotions" (featuring Muni Long)	RAW	City Girls
2023	"Above The Law"(featuring Teyana Taylor and Dj Khaled)	Too Good to Be True	Rick Ross and Meek Mill
2022	"Alien Superstar"	Renaissance	Beyoncé
2022	"Cuff It"	Renaissance	Beyoncé
2022	"Energy (featuring Beam)"	Renaissance	Beyoncé
2022	"Virgo's Groove"	Renaissance	Beyoncé
2022	"Move" (featuring Grace Jones and Tems)	Renaissance	Beyoncé
2022	"Heated"	Renaissance	Beyoncé
2022	"Pure/Honey”	Renaissance	Beyoncé
2022	"Summer Renaissance"	Renaissance	Beyoncé
2022	"Waste My Time"	TBA	Citizen Queen
2022	"XO"	TBA	Citizen Queen
2022	"Selfish"	Heaux Tales, Mo' Tales	Jazmine Sullivan
2022	"On God!"	Fool Me Once	Tiana Major9
2022	"Emotions"	Me vs. Myself	A Boogie wit da Hoodie
2022	"Gone Forever" (featuring Remy Ma and Dj Khaled)	Good Morning Gorgeous	Mary J. Blige
2021	"Westside"	La'Donna	La'Donna
2021	"No Ego"	Non-album single	Citizen Queen
2021	"Y"	Non-album single	Citizen Queen
2021	"Call Me Queen"	Non-album single	Citizen Queen
2021	"Woo Baby" (featuring Chris Brown)	Non-album single	Pop Smoke
2021	"Thankful" (featuring Lil Wayne and Jeremih)	Khaled Khaled	DJ Khaled
2021	"I Did It" (featuring Post Malone, Megan Thee Stallion, Lil Baby, and DaBaby)	Khaled Khaled	DJ Khaled
2021	"Just Be" (featuring Justin Timberlake)	Khaled Khaled	DJ Khaled
2021	"I Can Have It All" (featuring Bryson Tiller, H.E.R., and Meek Mill)	Khaled Khaled	DJ Khaled
2021	"I Love Her"	Sueños de Dalí	Paloma Mami
2020	"Chosen One"	LG1	Layton Greene
2020	"Pick Up Your Feelings"	Heaux Tales	Jazmine Sullivan
2020	"Love Reggae" (featuring Tinashe)	Good to Know	JoJo
2020	"What U Need"	Good to Know	JoJo
2020	"Black Parade"	The Lion King: The Gift	Beyoncé
2020	"Come Back To Me" (featuring Rick Ross and Junie)	The Album	Teyana Taylor
2020	"Concrete"	The Album	Teyana Taylor
2020	"Bad"	The Album	Teyana Taylor
2020	"Still"	The Album	Teyana Taylor
2020	"Ever Ever"	The Album	Teyana Taylor
2020	"Friends"	The Album	Teyana Taylor
2020	"Made It"	The Album	Teyana Taylor
2020	"We Got Love" (featuring Lauryn Hill)	The Album	Teyana Taylor
2020	"Sometimes"	Non-album single	H.E.R.
2019	"We Got Love"	Non-album single	Teyana Taylor
2019	"My Power"	The Lion King: The Gift	Beyoncé, Tierra Whack, Moonchild Sanelly, Nija, Busiswa and Yemi Alade
2019	"Mood 4 Eva"	The Lion King: The Gift	Beyoncé, Jay-Z and Childish Gambino featuring Oumou Sangaré
2019	"Nile"	The Lion King: The Gift	Beyoncé and Kendrick Lamar
2019	"Megatron"	Non-album single	Nicki Minaj
2019	"Commitment"	Chapter 38	Monica
2019	"Me + You"	Chapter 38	Monica
2019	"Be Yourself (from Little)"	Little (Original Motion Picture Soundtrack)	Chloe x Halle
2019	"Emotional" (featuring Quavo)	Icy	Saweetie
2019	"Feels"	While We Wait	Kehlani
2019	"Know"	Non-album single	Mary J Blige
2019	"Thriving" (featuring Nas)	Non-album single	Mary J Blige
2019	"Morning After Sex"	U2	Damar Jackson
2019	"Talk with Your Body"	2Sides (Side 1)	Jason Derulo
2019	"Champion (The Official 2019 FIBA Basketball World Cup Song)"	Non-album single	Jason Derulo
2019	"You Stay" (featuring Meek Mill, J Balvin, Lil Baby and Jeremih)	Father of Asahd	DJ Khaled
2019	"Just Us" (featuring SZA)	Father of Asahd	DJ Khaled
2019	"Jealous" (featuring Chris Brown, Lil Wayne and Big Sean)	Father of Asahd	DJ Khaled
2019	"Holy Mountain" (featuring Buju Banton, Sizzla, Mavado and 070 Shake)	Father of Asahd	DJ Khaled
2019	"In My Head"	Thank U, Next	Ariana Grande
2018	"Top Off" (featuring Jay-Z, Future and Beyoncé)	Father of Asahd	DJ Khaled
2018	"Nice"	Everything Is Love	The Carters
2018	"Friends"	Everything Is Love	The Carters
2018	"Black Effect"	Everything Is Love	The Carters
2018	"LoveHappy"	Everything Is Love	The Carters
2018	"Kelly"	Non-album single	Kelly Rowland
2018	"No Candle No Light"	Icarus Falls	Zayn
2018	"Gonna Love Me"	K.T.S.E.	Teyana Taylor
2018	"Issues/Hold On"	K.T.S.E.	Teyana Taylor
2018	"A Rose in Harlem"	K.T.S.E.	Teyana Taylor
2018	"Never Would Have Made It"	K.T.S.E.	Teyana Taylor
2018	"Ooh La La"	Joyride	Tinashe
2018	"Love Someone"	3 (The Purple Album)	Lukas Graham
2018	"Promise"	3 (The Purple Album)	Lukas Graham
2018	"Stick Around"	3 (The Purple Album)	Lukas Graham
2018	"I Believe" (featuring Demi Lovato)	A Wrinkle in Time (Original Motion Picture Soundtrack)	DJ Khaled
2018	"Let Me Live"	A Wrinkle in Time (Original Motion Picture Soundtrack)	Kehlani
2017	"CRZY"	SweetSexySavage	Kehlani
2017	"Whole Lotta Woman"	Meaning of Life	Kelly Clarkson
2017	"Drugs"	Non-album single	August Alsina
2016	"Hard To Forget Ya"	Glory	Britney Spears
2014	"Best Mistake" (featuring Big Sean)	My Everything	Ariana Grande
2012	"Tipsy Love" (featuring Future)	Dusk Till Dawn	Bobby V
2012	"Loveeeeeee Song" (featuring Future)	Unapologetic	Rihanna

== Recognition and awards ==
Year	Award	Category	Nominee(s)	Result	Ref.
2013	Grammy Awards	Best Urban Contemporary Album	Rihanna - Unapologetic	Won	
2018	Grammy Awards	Best Urban Contemporary Album	The Carters - Everything is Love	Won	
2018	Women in Film Crystal + Lucy Awards	Women in Film Artistic Excellence	Nova Wav	Won	
2020	Grammy Awards	Best Contemporary Christian Music Performance/Song	Lecrae - "Sunday Morning" (featuring Kirk Franklin)	Nominated	
2021	Grammy Awards	Song of the Year	Beyoncé - "Black Parade"	Nominated	
2021	Grammy Awards	Best R&B Song	Beyoncé - "Black Parade"	Nominated	
2021	Grammy Awards	Best R&B Performance	Beyoncé - "Black Parade"	Won	
2022	Grammy Awards	Best R&B Performance	"Pick Up Your Feelings"	Won	
2022	Grammy Awards	Best R&B Song	"Pick Up Your Feelings"	Nominated	
2023	Give Her FlowHERS Awards	The Pen It Forward Award	Nova Wav	Won	
