= Holy Key =

Single by DJ Khaled featuring Kendrick Lamar, Big Sean and Betty Wright

from the album Major Key
- Released: July 22, 2016
- Recorded: 2016
- Genre: Hip-hop
- Length: 4:41
- Label: We the Best; Epic
- Songwriters: Khaled Khaled; Sean Anderson; Kendrick Duckworth; Bessie Norris; Marcello Valenzano; Andre Lyon; Edward Davadi Jr.; Giuseppe Donaggio; Vito Pallavicini
- Producer: Cool & Dre

DJ Khaled singles chronology
"I Got the Keys" (2016)	"Holy Key" (2016)	"Do You Mind" (2016)

Kendrick Lamar singles chronology
"Untitled 07 | Levitate" (2016)	"Holy Key" (2016)	"The Greatest" (2016)

Big Sean singles chronology
"Champions" (2016)	"Holy Key" (2016)	"Bounce Back" (2016)

Betty Wright singles chronology
"Save Us" (2014)	"Holy Key" (2016)	"If You're Hearing This" (2017)

"Holy Key" is a song by American musician DJ Khaled featuring American rappers Kendrick Lamar and Big Sean and American singer Betty Wright. It was released on July 22, 2016, by We the Best Music Group and Epic Records as the third single of DJ Khaled's ninth studio album, Major Key. The song was produced by Cool & Dre.

== Background ==
Whilst in the process of recording "Holy Key", Khaled told Sean; "Yo. This record? I don't want no rules, no regulations, I don't want no regular song structure. I want you to just go bad. Catch the Holy Ghost and just... This is your chance to spit them bars. Even though you spit them all the time. Big this is a special one we gonna do it on." Khaled approached Kendrick Lamar about doing a feature on the song at a basketball game in LA they were both attending. Lamar responded to the idea of a possible collaboration; "No doubt, Khaled. I love what you're doing right now. I love how you're inspiring the world and the kids with your music. Send it through." Khaled was hesitant to send the song immediately as he "wanted to make sure it was the right record", and with Lamar's schedule being busy, Khaled feared the record not being done on time. Lamar's verse was sent two days after Khaled spoke to him.

In the days leading up to the release of "Holy Key", DJ Khaled went on Snapchat and teased by yelling "Ay Juan, did the Kendrick vocals get here yet?" and that Kendrick would have the most talked about the verse on his album. Khaled would then proceed to comment on the single: "Man, we did our damn thing. Those are two different rappers and guess what? They both great. That's how you make records. I'm not here just to make a record. That's not what Khaled does. I'ma try to bring the best out of everybody!".

== Chart performance ==
"Holy Key" debuted at number 84 on the Billboard Hot 100 for the chart dated August 20, 2016.

== Charts ==
Chart (2016)	Peak position
Australia (ARIA)	99
France (SNEP)	151
New Zealand Heatseekers (Recorded Music NZ)	5
US Billboard Hot 100	84
US Hot R&B/Hip-Hop Songs (Billboard)	29

== Certifications ==
Region	Certification	Certified units/sales
United States (RIAA)	Gold	500,000^{‡}
^{‡} Sales+streaming figures based on certification alone.

== Release history ==
Region	Date	Format	Label	Ref.
United States	July 22, 2016	Digital download; streaming	We the Best; Epic	
