= Yolk (disambiguation) =

The yolk is the nutrient-bearing portion of the egg.

Yolk may also refer to:

- Yolk (magazine), a quarterly magazine for young Asian Americans
- Yolk (novel), a 2021 novel by Mary H.K. Choi
