= Emergency Contact =

Emergency Contact may refer to:

- Emergency management
- Emergency telephone number
- "Emergency Contact", a 2017 episode of Will & Grace
- Emergency Contact (novel), a 2018 novel by Mary H.K. Choi
- "Emergency Contact" (song), a 2022 song by Pierce the Veil
