= Mary H.K. Choi =

American author and journalist

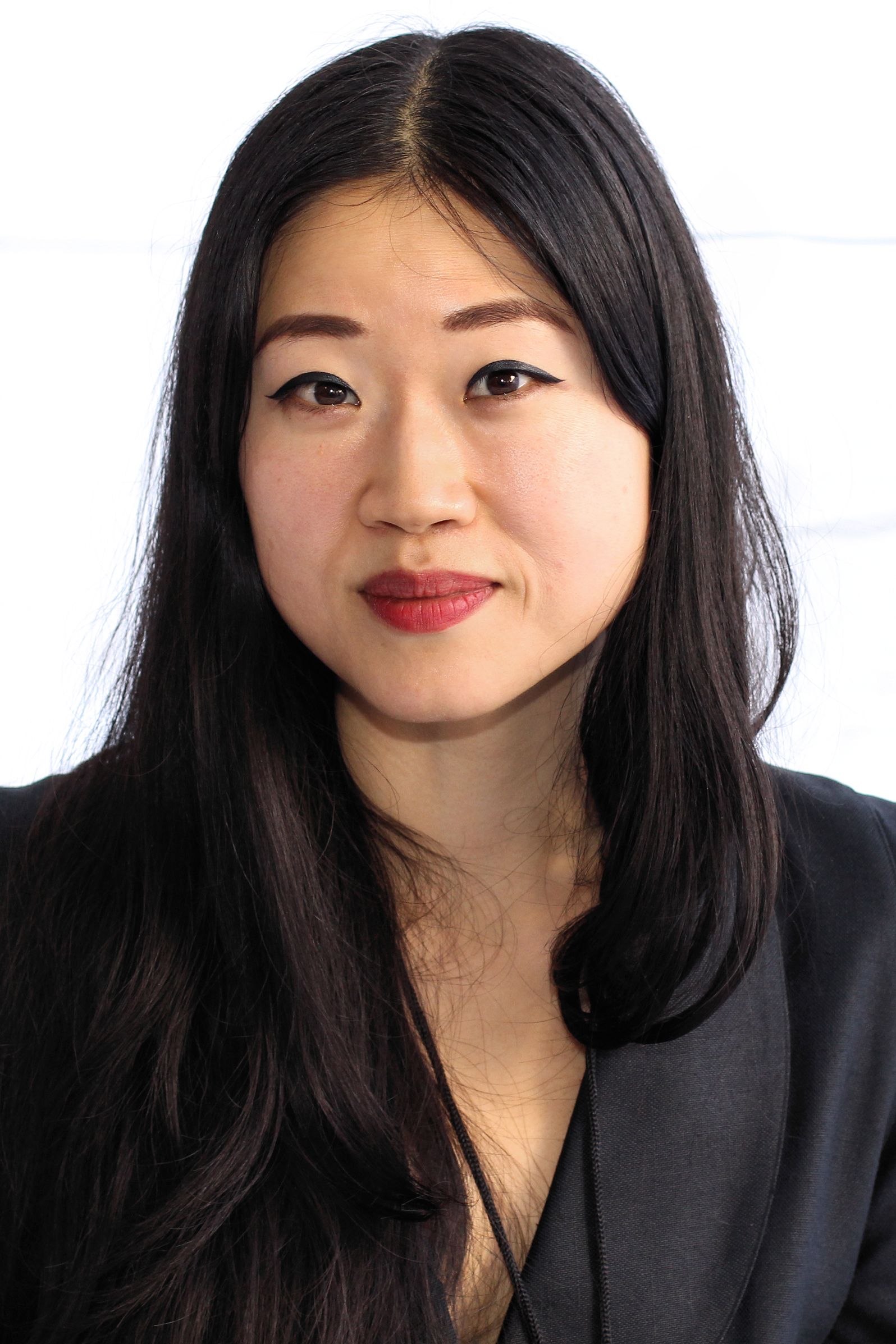
- Choi at the 2018 Texas Book Festival
- Born: November 21, 1979 (age 46); Seoul, South Korea
- Education: University of Texas at Austin
- Occupations: Author, journalist
- Years active: 2002–present
- Employer: Vice Media
- Works: Emergency Contact (2018); Permanent Record (2019); Pool House (2026)
- Relatives: Michael Choi
- Website: choitotheworld.com

Mary H.K. Choi (born November 21, 1979) is an American author, editor, television and print journalist. She is the author of the young adult novels Emergency Contact (2018), Permanent Record (2019), and Yolk (2021). She is the culture correspondent on Vice News Tonight on HBO and was previously a columnist at Wired and Allure magazines as well as a freelance writer.

== Life ==
Mary Hyun Kyung Choi was born in Seoul, South Korea on November 21, 1979 and immigrated to Hong Kong before her first birthday. She lived there until moving to Texas just before she turned 14. Choi's parents owned and managed a Korean restaurant to support their family. She attended a large public high school in a suburb of San Antonio, then college at the University of Texas at Austin, where she majored in Textile and Apparel. After college, Choi lived in New York until moving to Los Angeles circa 2014, a decision she described in Oh, Never Mind. In a 2021 talk at House of SpeakEasy's Seriously Entertaining program, Choi detailed her struggle with bulimia that lasted into adulthood.

In a 2024 article in The Cut, Choi wrote about being diagnosed with autism as an adult, at age 43.

Her brother is Marvel and DC artist Michael Choi. She speaks four languages.

== Career ==
After graduating from college, Choi moved from Austin to New York City in 2002. Her first job in 2002 was as an editorial intern at Mass Appeal magazine in Red Hook, Brooklyn, where she eventually became an editor. She then worked at XXL and Hip Hop Soul before becoming founding editor-in-chief of Missbehave, a Brooklyn-based alternative magazine for young women. Through her time at XXL, she published as Mary Choi; since then, she has included her middle initials.

Choi has drawn notice for her reporting and essays on a wide range of topics, including teen use of social media, her relationship with her mom, music, life as an ex-pat, and fashion. She has been a columnist at Wired, editor-at-large for MTV Style and a contributing editor at Allure. She has also written for GQ, The New York Times, New York, The Atlantic, Billboard and The Fader.

Choi is a culture correspondent at Vice News Tonight on HBO. She was the executive producer of House of Style: Music, Models and MTV, a 2012 documentary. In 2013 she became the supervising producer, then head writer, of Take Part Live, a daily live news show for Participant Media.

Choi hosts a monthly podcast called Hey, Cool Job!, in which she interviews her peers and friends about their jobs and the paths they took to arrive in their roles. Notable guests include journalist Jenna Wortham, porn actress Asa Akira, and comedian Joel Kim Booster. She also hosts a more casual, "stream of consciousness" style mini podcast called Hey, Cool Life!. The minipod, spanning between 10-20 minutes in length, is a place where Choi focuses on the intersection of mental health and creativity. She mentions that she created the podcast after being inspired by her love of voice memos she would send to her friends.

=== Books ===
Choi was the writer of Marvel Comics' Lady Deadpool No. 1. She has also written Marvel's Shanna the She-Devil and has contributed to the CMYK anthology and the Ghosts anthology for Vertigo Comics.

In 2014, Choi published a collection of essays as a Kindle single called, Oh, Never Mind, which describes, among other topics, her decision to leave New York. She had met with a number of editors and grew frustrated by the pessimism she encountered about the sales prospects for an essay collection; instead she accepted an offer from Amazon to write the short collection of essays as a Kindle Single for a $5000 payment plus 70% of profits, the right to set the price of the collection, and retention of full ownership of the copyright.

Choi also co-wrote the DJ Khaled book, The Keys, developed from Khaled's Snapchat videos in which he offers fans advice on how to achieve the lifestyle he has. In a review for The New Yorker, Hua Hsu said that while the book contained some standard self-help fare, "there's ultimately something goofy and uplifting about it all, a warm generosity that makes Khaled someone whose success you can't begrudge."

Choi's first novel, Emergency Contact, is a young adult novel published in 2018 by Simon & Schuster. Choi has described the book as partly inspired by Judy Blume's novel Forever..., because Blume had "said she just wanted to write a story about ‘two people who have sex but then nothing terrible happens'...I love that," Choi told The New York Times. Choi's novel is a love story conducted primarily by text message, with Penny (a Korean-American freshman at the University of Texas at Austin) giving Sam her number after she happens to be passing by as Sam has his first panic attack. Writing for Entertainment Weekly, David Canfield said in Emergency Contact, Choi "vividly realizes Korean-American culture and explores microaggressions on a sharply recognizable level...weav[ing] these experiences into a narrative rife with witty banter and steamy romantic chemistry; the YA frame doesn't push the more challenging material to the margins, but rather renders it naturalistically potent."

== Works and publications ==
- Choi, Mary H.K., Lady Deadpool #1. Marvel Comics, 2010; UPC: 5960607113-00111
- Choi, Mary H.K., Ghosts. Vertigo Comics (DC Comics), 2012.
- Choi, Mary H.K., Oh Never Mind. Kindle Single, 2014; ASIN: B00N93UVC2
- Choi, Mary H.K., CMYK (black). Vertigo Comics (DC Comics), 2015; ISBN 978-1401253363
- Choi, Mary H.K., Emergency Contact. New York: Simon & Schuster, 2018; ISBN 978-1-5344-0896-8
- Choi, Mary H.K., Permanent Record. New York: Simon & Schuster, 2019; ISBN 978-1-5344-4597-0
- Choi, Mary H.K., Yolk. New York: Simon & Schuster Books for Young Readers, 2021; ISBN 978-1534446007
- Choi, Mary H.K., Pool House. Flatiron Books, 2026; ISBN 9781250800442, 1250800447
