= You Stay =

Single by DJ Khaled featuring Meek Mill, J Balvin, Lil Baby and Jeremih

from the album Father of Asahd
- Released: May 17, 2019
- Length: 4:35
- Label: We the Best; Epic; Sony Music
- Songwriters: Khaled Khaled; Robert Williams; Jose Balvin; Dominique Jones; Jeremy Felton; Brittany Coney; Denisia Andrews; Ralph Middlebrooks; Clarence Satchell; William Beck; Leroy Bonner; Marshall Jones; Marvin Pierce; James Williams; Sergio George; Linda Caballero; Shirley Marte
- Producers: DJ Khaled; Ben Billions; Rashad Smith

DJ Khaled singles chronology
"Just Us" (2019)	"You Stay" (2019)	"Wish Wish" (2019)

Meek Mill singles chronology
"100 Bands" (2019)	"You Stay" (2019)	"Backwards" (2019)

J Balvin singles chronology
"Mañana Es Too Late" (2019)	"You Stay" (2019)	"Ven y Hazlo Tú" (2019)

Lil Baby singles chronology
"Trap" (2019)	"You Stay" (2019)	"Phone Down" (2019)

Jeremih singles chronology
"The Light" (2019)	"You Stay" (2019)	"On Chill" (2019)

Music video
- "You Stay" on YouTube

"You Stay" is a song by American record producer DJ Khaled, featuring guest vocals from Colombian singer J Balvin and American musicians Meek Mill, Lil Baby, and Jeremih. Released on May 17, 2019, it is the fifth single from Khaled's eleventh studio album Father of Asahd (2019).

== Composition ==
The song samples "No Me Conviene" by Puerto Rican singer India and interpolates "Señorita" by American rapper Puff Daddy, which also samples the song. Jeremih sings the hook and a verse, with Meek Mill, Lil Baby and J Balvin provide verses. Lyrically, they ask women why they are still loyal to them when their significant other has not treated them well.

== Music video ==
A music video for the song was released on May 18, 2019. It was directed by DJ Khaled, Eif Rivera, and Ivan Berrios, and shows a party at Khaled's mansion in Miami, where the artists hang out surrounded by women. The artists are shown "strutting through the home's marble floors, poolside, and courtyard, all wearing an assortment of colorful suits." The video features a cameo from Turkish butcher Salt Bae, who launches a slice of meat into Khaled's mouth.

== Charts ==
Chart (2019)	Peak position
Canada Hot 100 (Billboard)	63
France Downloads (SNEP)	198
US Billboard Hot 100	44
US Hot R&B/Hip-Hop Songs (Billboard)	19
US Rhythmic Airplay (Billboard)	25

== Certifications ==
Region	Certification	Certified units/sales
United States (RIAA)	Platinum	1,000,000^{‡}
^{‡} Sales+streaming figures based on certification alone.
