= Kelly (song) =

Promotional single by Kelly Rowland
- Released: November 22, 2018
- Recorded: 2018
- Genre: Hip hop; R&B
- Length: 3:01
- Label: Self-released
- Songwriters: Denisa Andrews; Kyle Coleman; Brittany Coney; Tim Weatherspoon

"Kelly" is a song recorded by American singer Kelly Rowland. Rowland self-released the song on November 22, 2018. It is a hip hop and R&B song, and some critics referred to it as influenced by trap music and club music. Rowland boasts about herself in the lyrics. It was written by Denisa Andrews, Kyle Coleman, Brittany Coney and Rowland's husband-manager, Tim Weatherspoon. The song received mixed reviews from critics.

== Composition and lyrics ==
"Kelly" is a hip hop and R&B song, which some critics described as inspired by trap music and club music. HotNewHipHop's Karlton Jahmal connected the song with "the Atlanta trap sound". Idolator's Mike Wass wrote that the composition had an uptempo "staccato beat", and other commentators noted the single for its bass and synthesizer. Several media outlets compared Kelly Rowland's vocals to rapping. Wass referred to Rowland as being in "full hip-hop mode". Rowland praises herself throughout the song, including boasts about her "class, ass, a man, whips, drip".

== Release ==
Rowland self-released "Kelly" on November 22, 2018. The song was later made available for digital download on November 30. It was Rowland's first solo release since her fourth studio album Talk a Good Game in 2013. According to HipHopDX's Trent Clark, Rowland used "Kelly" as a gift to her fans. Prior to the song's release, the singer teased lyrics on her Instagram. Rowland used the single cover as her Instagram account's wallpaper. She later shared other photos from the same shoot on the social media platform. The single led to the hashtag #GoKellyGo.

== Critical reception ==
The critical response to "Kelly" was mixed. Essence's Sydney Scott and Uproxx's Cherise Johnson cited the song as a highlight during the week of its release, and Hollywood Life's Courteney Larocca summed it up as "FIRE". Wass praised the single as catchy, but wrote that it "takes a couple of listens to fully process". Jezebel's Clover Hope criticized "Kelly" as "not a super earworm hit", but felt it was "something sufficient to bop to".

== Charts ==
Chart (2018)	Peak position
US R&B Digital Songs (Billboard)	14

== Release history ==
Region	Format	Date	Label
Various	YouTube	November 22, 2018	Kelly Rowland
Various	Digital download	November 30, 2018	Kelly Rowland
