= Yolk (novel) =

2021 novel by Mary H.K. Choi

- Author: Mary H.K. Choi
- Publisher: Simon & Schuster
- Publication date: March 2, 2021
- ISBN: 978-1534446007
- Preceded by: Permanent Record

Yolk is a 2021 young adult novel by Mary H.K. Choi, published by Simon & Schuster.

== Synopsis ==
The novel follows two estranged sisters: June and Jayne Baek. June, the older sister, works in finance and considers herself to be a responsible, all-knowing elder child. Jayne, the younger sister, is more carefree and, at times, reckless. The two hardly talk to each other, but when June is suddenly diagnosed with cancer, Jayne finds herself pulled in to the gravity of her sister's life.

== Critical reception ==
Kirkus Reviews called the book "Intense, raw, textured" and stated that "Portraying intergenerational immigrant experiences with a Korean cultural focus, this poignant story underscores self-sacrifices that prove to be life-sustaining in the name of sisterly love."

The Southern Bookseller Review stated that, in the novel, "Coming of age, learning to live on one’s own, and navigating modern romance are all tackled in turn with the grace and realism for which readers have learned to love her writing. Come for the angst, stay for the characters you may just love like sisters." Culture Fly, giving the book five out of five stars, wrote that the book's broad array of subjects—"explorations of hyphenated identities, family ties, the difficulties of making a home for yourself in New York City, eating disorders, America’s terrifying healthcare system"—made it "an honest depiction of life" skillfully executed by Choi's "detail, warmth, perceptiveness and humour". The Young Folks wrote that "For a resonant and complexly multi-layered novel, Yolk is the perfect novel for our contemporary moment." Sunstroke Magazine said "Choi has a way of making her characters real and complex people that make cohesive choices according to their character, background and personality, while also being unpredictable."
