= Permanent Record (novel) =

2019 young adult novel by Mary H.K. Choi

- First edition cover
- Author: Mary H.K. Choi
- Audio read by: Vikas Adam
- Cover artist: ohgigue (illustration); Lizzy Bromley (design)
- Language: English
- Genre: Young adult novel
- Publisher: Simon & Schuster Books for Young Readers
- Publication date: September 3, 2019
- Publication place: United States
- Media type: Print (Hardcover)
- Pages: 432
- ISBN: 978-1-5344-4597-0
- Dewey Decimal: [Fic]
- LC Class: PZ7.1.C5316 Per 2019

Permanent Record is a 2019 young adult novel by Mary H.K. Choi. It is her second novel and was published on September 3, 2019, by Simon & Schuster Books for Young Readers, an imprint of Simon & Schuster. In September 2019, it was selected for the Teen Vogue Book Club.

== Plot ==
After dropping out of New York University, Pablo Neruda Rind begins working the graveyard shift at a deli in Brooklyn while paying off a sizable credit card debt. In the early morning, pop music star Leanna Smart walks into the deli. The two strike up a conversation, with Pablo unaware of Leanna's stardom. After she returns days later, Pablo becomes swept up into Leanna's exciting and lavish lifestyle.

== Background ==
On February 15, 2019, an excerpt of the novel was published through Entertainment Weekly. Choi's previous novel, Emergency Contact, was also previewed through Entertainment Weekly.

Permanent Record was published on September 3, 2019, by Simon & Schuster Books for Young Readers, an imprint of Simon & Schuster.

== Reception ==
The novel debuted at number eight on The New York Times Young Adult Hardcover best-sellers list on September 22, 2019. Publishers Weekly gave the novel a positive review, praising its characters and writing, "If the conclusion of the novel seems rushed, the rising action—filled with conflict, captivating events, and authentic-sounding, often humorous dialogue—will win readers, and teens like Pablo, who are unsure who they want to be, will relate to his dilemmas." Kirkus Reviews gave the novel a mixed review, writing, "While the language has a contemporary feel and the range of diverse, appealing characters accurately reflects modern-day New York, the plot frequently drags, and character development is weak." Susannah Goldstein of Booklist called the protagonist Pablo a "winning narrator" and wrote, "Choi's specificity, realistic dialogue, and humor ensure that the personal and romantic journeys feel warm and rewarding but never saccharine."

== Film adaptation ==
In December 2019, it was reported that Jon M. Chu is set to produce a feature film adaptation of the novel for Warner Bros. and is in talks to direct.
