= I Might Need Security =

Single by Chance the Rapper

Single by Chance the Rapper
- Released: July 19, 2018
- Length: 4:01
- Songwriter(s): Chancelor Bennett
- Producer(s): Peter CottonTale; Chance the Rapper; Smoko Ono

Chance the Rapper singles chronology
"Wala Cam" (2018)	"I Might Need Security" (2018)	"No Brainer" (2018)

"I Might Need Security" is a song written by American rapper Chance the Rapper. It was released as a single on July 19, 2018, and was produced by Chance, Peter CottonTale and Smoko Ono.

== Background and composition ==
The song samples one part of the piano session from the television special Jamie Foxx: I Might Need Security. Chance the Rapper takes shots at his detractors, most notably Chicago mayor Rahm Emanuel. In the second verse, Chance criticizes how Chicago news outlets have been treating him, and reveals that he has purchased news website Chicagoist.

== Charts ==
Chart (2018)	Peak position
Australia (ARIA Hitseekers)	5
Australia (ARIA Urban Singles)	35
Canada (Canadian Hot 100)	80
New Zealand Hot Singles (RMNZ)	5
UK Singles (OCC)	94
US Billboard Hot 100	60
US Hot R&B/Hip-Hop Songs (Billboard)	25
