= Top Off =

2018 single by DJ Khaled featuring Jay-Z, Future and Beyoncé

Single by DJ Khaled featuring Jay-Z, Future and Beyoncé

from the album Father of Asahd
- Released: March 2, 2018
- Studio: We the Best Studios (Miami, FL); Carter Estate (Los Angeles, CA)
- Genre: Trap
- Length: 3:50
- Label: Epic
- Songwriters: Khaled Khaled; Shawn Carter; Nayvadius Wilburn; Beyoncé Knowles Carter; Joseph Zarrillo
- Producers: Zarrillo; DJ Khaled; Beyoncé

DJ Khaled singles chronology
"Wild Thoughts" (2017)	"Top Off" (2018)	"I Believe" (2018)

Jay-Z singles chronology
"Bam" (2018)	"Top Off" (2018)	"Apeshit" (2018)

Future singles chronology
"Faded Love" (2018)	"Top Off" (2018)	"No Shame" (2018)

Beyoncé singles chronology
"Perfect Duet" (2017)	"Top Off" (2018)	"Apeshit" (2018)

"Top Off" is a song recorded by American record producer DJ Khaled featuring American rappers Jay-Z and Future and American singer Beyoncé. The artists wrote the song with Joe Zarrillo who produced it with Khaled and Beyoncé. It was released on March 2, 2018, as the lead single from Khaled's eleventh studio album, Father of Asahd. Complex magazine ranked Beyoncé's verse on the song as the second best on the album; she performed it during her 2018 Coachella performance and subsequently included it in Homecoming: The Live Album (2019).

== Release and promotion ==
On February 28, 2018, DJ Khaled announced that he would reveal the title of his upcoming album and release its lead single on March 1, 2018. Prior to the release, Khaled posted a video of him playing the song for comedian Kevin Hart, who reacted by saying: "The world flatlined."

== Critical reception ==
"Top Off" received mixed reviews from critics. According to Billboard's Gil Kaufman, "Top Off" is "a breathless outlaw track about outrunning the police and enjoying the finer things". Jon Caramanica of The New York Times disliked Future's verse, writing: "Once you swipe away the numbing hook and pseudo-verse from Future, there, plain as day, is an impressive Jay-Z/Beyoncé duet." Larry Fitzmaurice of Pitchfork gave a negative review of the song, writing that it is "more bland than it is bizarrely successful, proof that Khaled's blockbuster-stuffed style often suffocates under the heft of its own bravado". He opined that the artists' personalities "are simply too distinct at this point to produce something compelling when shoved together on the same track". Pat King of Metro named it "one of the catchiest songs in recent memory about outrunning the cops". Adreon Patterson of Paste felt that "the track is a little underwhelming considering the collaborators' musical status". Serving as a follow-up to "Shining" and "I Got the Keys", he found the song "disappointing and anti-climactic". Tom Breihan of Stereogum praised Khaled for making the song sounds like both a "fame-flexing celebrity event" and an "actual song". Lauren O'Neill of Noisey complimented Beyoncé's ability "to knock every other rapper out of the park with her skill and flow". Bianca Gracie of Fuse declared that the song lacks innovation and fails to be memorable. "Jay-Z and Beyoncé deserve a harder beat underneath their flows; the juvenile SoundCloud production didn't do them any favors especially on Beyoncé's opening part." Following the release of Father of Asahd, Frazier Tharpe of Complex magazine ranked the features on the album, with Beyoncé's verse on "Top Off" coming in 2nd, behind Nipsey Hussle's verse on "Higher". Tharpe commented that "if there's any benefit to keeping this old dog of a song on the album, it's giving this blackout verse from B a proper home".

== Credits and personnel ==
Credits adapted from Tidal.

Performers

- DJ Khaled – composition, production, vocals
- Jay-Z – composition, vocals
- Future – composition, vocals
- Beyoncé – composition, production, vocals

Additional musician

- Joe Zarrillo – composition, production

Technical

- Manny Marroquin – mix engineering
- Chris Athens – master engineering
- Chris Galland – engineering
- Robin Florent – engineering assistance
- Scott Desmarais – engineering assistance
- Juan Peña – record engineering
- Young Guru – record engineering

== Charts ==
Chart (2018)	Peak position
Australia Urban (ARIA)	32
Canada Hot 100 (Billboard)	48
France (SNEP)	55
Germany (GfK)	98
Ireland (IRMA)	67
New Zealand Heatseekers (RMNZ)	5
Portugal (AFP)	72
Scottish Singles Sales (Official Charts)	67
Sweden (Sverigetopplistan)	60
Switzerland (Schweizer Hitparade)	66
UK Singles (Official Charts)	41
US Billboard Hot 100	22
US Hot R&B/Hip-Hop Songs (Billboard)	14
US Rhythmic Airplay (Billboard)	11

== Certifications ==
Region	Certification	Certified units/sales
Brazil (Pro-Música Brasil)	Gold	20,000^{‡}
Brazil (Pro-Música Brasil) Homecoming Live Version	Gold	20,000^{‡}
Canada (Music Canada)	Gold	40,000^{‡}
United States (RIAA)	Platinum	1,000,000^{‡}
^{‡} Sales+streaming figures based on certification alone.

== Release history ==
Region	Date	Format	Label	Ref.
Various	March 2, 2018	Digital download	Epic	
Australia	March 2, 2018	Contemporary hit radio	Sony Music Entertainment Australia	
Italy	March 2, 2018	Contemporary hit radio	Sony	
United States	March 6, 2018	Urban contemporary radio	We the Best; Roc Nation; Columbia; Epic	
United Kingdom	March 10, 2018	Contemporary hit radio	RCA	
United States	March 13, 2018 (Note: Re-release)	Urban contemporary radio	We the Best; Roc Nation; Columbia; Epic	
