= Father of Asahd =

Studio album by DJ Khaled
- Released: May 17, 2019
- Recorded: 2018–19
- Genre: Hip-hop; R&B
- Length: 54:25
- Label: We the Best; Epic
- Producer: Khaled Khaled (also exec.); 808-Ray; Aaron Bow; Ben Billions; Beyoncé; Cool & Dre; DaviDior; DJ 360; Frank Dukes; Joe Zarrillo; Louis Bell; LVM; Major Seven; Nic Nac; Sir Nolan; Nova Wav; Poo Bear; Streetrunner; Swede; Tarik Azzouz; Tay Keith; Teddy Walton; Rashad Smith

DJ Khaled chronology
Grateful (2017)	Father of Asahd (2019)	Khaled Khaled (2021)

Singles from Father of Asahd
- 1. "Top Off" Released: March 2, 2018; 2. "No Brainer" Released: July 27, 2018; 3. "Higher" Released: May 17, 2019; 4. "Just Us" Released: May 17, 2019; 5. "You Stay" Released: May 17, 2019

Father of Asahd is the eleventh studio album by American disc jockey and record producer DJ Khaled. It was released on May 17, 2019, by We the Best Music Group and Epic Records. It features the singles "Top Off" and "No Brainer." On May 16, DJ Khaled revealed the track listing and features, as well as that the music videos for "Higher", "Just Us", "Celebrate", "Jealous" and "Holy Mountain" would be released throughout the day of May 17, followed by the video for "You Stay" on May 18, and "Wish Wish" and "Weather the Storm" on May 20. DJ Khaled scored his third career Grammy nomination with "Higher" which won the Best Rap/Sung Performance at the 62nd Grammy Awards. The album also features guest appearances from Buju Banton, Sizzla, Mavado, 070 Shake, Cardi B, 21 Savage, Chris Brown, Lil Wayne, Big Sean, SZA, Meek Mill, J Balvin, Lil Baby, Jeremih, Travis Scott, Post Malone, Nipsey Hussle, John Legend, Nas, CeeLo Green, Jeezy, Rick Ross, Gunna, Jay-Z, Future, Beyoncé, Justin Bieber, Chance the Rapper, and Quavo.

== Background ==
In March 2018, DJ Khaled announced the title, upon releasing the lead single, called "Top Off". He named the album after his eldest child, Asahd Tuck Khaled. In March 2019, he announced the release date, while in the meantime, promoting the album extensively on his social media accounts. He also posted a trailer for the album. DJ Khaled has also teased numerous collaborations on his social media, which, along with Future, Jay-Z and Beyoncé on "Top Off", and Justin Bieber, Chance the Rapper and Quavo on "No Brainer", include J Balvin, Cardi B, Meek Mill, Post Malone, Travis Scott, Chief Keef, Bryson Tiller, Sizzla, and 2 Chainz. In April 2019, TMZ reported that "Higher" featuring Nipsey Hussle and John Legend would appear on the album. DJ Khaled, Nipsey Hussle, and John Legend shot the music video before Nipsey's death on March 31, 2019.

== Critical reception ==
Professional ratings
Aggregate scores
Source	Rating
Metacritic	59/100
Review scores
Source	Rating
AllMusic	3.5/5 stars
Exclaim	7/10
HipHopDX	2.2/5
NME	4/5 stars
Pitchfork	5.4/10
Rolling Stone	2/5 stars

Father of Asahd received mixed reviews among critics. On Metacritic which assigns a rating of up to 100, the album received an average of 59, indicating "Mixed or average reviews" based on 7 critics.

Andy Kellman of AllMusic gave the album 3.5 stars out of 5 and also noted in his review on the album by saying "Although instant, maximum commercial impact is no doubt the primary objective, the album does come across as more considered than the average Khaled LP."

== Commercial performance ==
Father of Asahd debuted at number two on the US Billboard 200 with 136,000 album-equivalent units, with 34,000 copies as pure album sales in its first week. In the second week, the album remained at number two on the chart, earning an additional 58,000 album-equivalent units. In its third week, the album dropped to number three on the chart, earning 39,000 more units. In its fourth week, the album dropped to number eight on the chart, earning 31,000 more units, bringing its four-week total to 264,000 album-equivalent units. On May 17, 2020, the album was certified platinum by the Recording Industry Association of America (RIAA) for combined sales and album-equivalent units of over 1,000,000 units in the United States.

== Controversy ==
On June 5, 2019, sources reported DJ Khaled was fuming at his label after Father of Asahd failed to debut at the top of the Billboard 200. Father of Asahd debuted behind American rapper and record producer Tyler, the Creator's sixth studio album, Igor.

On June 6, DJ Khaled posted a now-deleted video on his Instagram page that many believe was aimed at Tyler, the Creator after his album beat out Father of Asahd for the number one spot on the Billboard charts. In the video, Khaled stated, "Here's the thing, I make albums so people can play it. And you actually hear it. You know, driving your car you hear another car playing it. Go to the barber shop, you hear them playing it. You know, turn the radio on, and you hear them playing it. It's playing everywhere - it's called great music. It's called albums that you actually hear the songs. Not no mysterious shit, and you never hear it." Many people took the "mysterious shit" line to be about Tyler, who responded on Twitter when a follower told him, "Wow doin pretty good for some mysterious shit." Tyler told the follower, "yeah i am, IGOR OUT NOW."

== Track listing ==
Credits adapted from Tidal.

No.	Title	Writer(s)	Producer(s)	Length
1.	"Holy Mountain" (featuring Buju Banton, Sizzla, Mavado, and 070 Shake)	Khaled Khaled; Mark Myrie; Miguel Collins; David Brooks; Danielle Balbuena; Brittany Coney; Denisia Andrews; Omar Walker; Henry Lawes; Billy Rowe	DJ Khaled; Major Seven	4:54
2.	"Wish Wish" (featuring Cardi B and 21 Savage)	Khaled; Belcalis Almanzar; Shayaa Abraham-Joseph; Jordan Thorpe; Brytavious Chambers	DJ Khaled; Tay Keith	3:22
3.	"Jealous" (featuring Chris Brown, Lil Wayne, and Big Sean)	Khaled; Christopher Brown; Dwayne Carter, Jr.; Sean Anderson; Coney; Andrews; Chambers; Kingsley Gardner; Diana King; Andrew Saidenberg; Roger Ball; Malcolm Duncan; Stephen Ferrone; Alan Gorrie; Owen McIntyre; James Stewart	DJ Khaled; Tay Keith; Nova Wav^{[b]}	4:15
4.	"Just Us" (featuring SZA)	Khaled; Solána Rowe; Coney; Andrews; André Benjamin; Antwan Patton; David Sheats	DJ Khaled; LVM^{[b]}	3:41
5.	"You Stay" (featuring Meek Mill, J Balvin, Lil Baby, and Jeremih)	Khaled; Robert Williams; Jose Balvin; Dominique Jones; Jeremy Felton; Coney; Andrews; Ralph Middlebrooks; Clarence Satchell; William Beck; Leroy Bonner; Marshall Jones; Marvin Pierce; James Williams; Sergio George; Linda Caballero; Shirley Marte	DJ Khaled; Ben Billions^{[b]}; Rashad Smith^{[b]}	4:35
6.	"Celebrate" (featuring Travis Scott and Post Malone)	Khaled; Jacques Webster II; Austin Post; Travis Walton; Adam Feeney	DJ Khaled; Teddy Walton; Frank Dukes; Louis Bell^{[c]}; Aaron Bow^{[c]}	3:26
7.	"Higher" (featuring Nipsey Hussle and John Legend)	Khaled; Ermias Asghedom; John Stephens; Kevin Cossom; HM Henry Davis	DJ Khaled; Streetrunner; Tarik Azzouz	2:56
8.	"Won't Take My Soul" (featuring Nas and CeeLo Green)	Khaled; Nasir Jones; Thomas Callaway; Cossom; Azzouz; Roberto Curti; Warwar; Leah Marie; Nathaniel Levingston	DJ Khaled; Streetrunner; Azzouz; Swede^{[b]}	4:19
9.	"Weather the Storm" (featuring Meek Mill and Lil Baby)	Khaled; Williams; Jones; Warwar; Azzouz; Alec Costandinos; Michel Jouveaux	DJ Khaled; Streetrunner; Azzouz	2:33
10.	"Big Boy Talk" (featuring Jeezy and Rick Ross)	Khaled; Jay Jenkins; William Roberts; Andre Lyon; Marcello Valenzano; Rayshon Cobbs, Jr.; Pete Jackson	DJ Khaled; Cool & Dre; 808-Ray	2:45
11.	"Freak n You" (featuring Lil Wayne and Gunna)	Khaled; D. Carter; Sergio Kitchens; Joseph Zarrillo; Omed Rozbayani; Donald DeGrate, Jr.	DJ Khaled; Joe Zarrillo; Ben Billions ^{[a]}; DJ 360^{[a]}	3:06
12.	"Top Off" (featuring Jay-Z, Future, and Beyoncé)	Khaled; Shawn Carter; Nayvadius Wilburn; Beyoncé Knowles-Carter; Coney; Andrews; Zarrillo	Joe Zarrillo; DJ Khaled^{[b]}; Beyoncé^{[b]}	3:50
13.	"No Brainer" (featuring Justin Bieber, Chance the Rapper, and Quavo)	Khaled; Justin Bieber; Chancelor Bennett; Quavious Marshall; Jason Boyd; Nolan Lambrozza; Nicholas Balding; David Park; Melvin Riley	DJ Khaled; Nic Nac; DaviDior; Poo Bear^{[a]}; Sir Nolan^{[b]}	4:20
14.	"Thank You" (featuring Big Sean)	Khaled; Anderson; Warwar; Azzouz; Rodney Jerkins; Kelly Price	DJ Khaled; Streetrunner; Azzouz	3:06
15.	"Holy Ground" (featuring Buju Banton)	Khaled; Myrie; Charles Fox; Norman Gimbel	DJ Khaled; Ben Billions^{[b]}; LVM^{[b]}	3:17
Total length:				54:25

Notes

- ^{^[a]} signifies a co-producer
- ^{^[b]} signifies a miscellaneous producer
- ^{^[c]} signifies an uncredited additional producer

Sample credits

- "Holy Mountain" contains a sample from "One Spliff a Day", written by Henry Lawes and Billy Rowe, as performed by Billy Boyo.
- “Jealous” contain a sample from “Shy Guy” written by Diana King, Kingsley Gardner, and Andrew Saidenberg, as performed by Diana King.
- "Just Us" contain a sample from "Ms. Jackson", written by André Benjamin, Antwan Patton, and David Sheats, as performed by OutKast.
- "Freak n You" contain a sample from "Freek'n You", written by Donald DeGrate Jr., as performed by Jodeci.
- "Holy Ground" contains a sample from "To Zion", written by Charles Fox, and Norman Gimbel, performed by Lauryn Hill.

== Personnel ==
Credits adapted from Tidal.

Musicians

- Maxime Breton – guitar (track 14)
- Leah Marie – background vocals (track 14)
- Nicky Burt – background vocals (track 15)
- Adina Myrie – background vocals (track 15)

Technical

- Juan "AyoJuan" Peña – recording (all tracks)
- Oscar Moncada – recording (tracks 1, 15)
- Vychalle Singh – recording (track 1)
- Justus Arison – recording (track 1)
- Mac Akkitson – recording (track 2)
- Patrizio Pigliapoco – recording (track 3)
- Hector Castro – recording (track 4)
- Rich Harris – recording (track 4)
- David Kim – recording (track 5)
- Anthony Cruz – recording (tracks 5, 9)
- Louis Bell – recording (track 6)
- Joe Zarrillo – recording (track 7)
- Vincent Mayfield – recording (track 7)
- Garnett "G" Flynn – recording (track 7)
- Thomas "Tomcat" Bennett – recording (track 10)
- Manny Galvez – recording (track 11), engineering assistant (track 3), recording (track 11)
- Gimel "Young Guru" Keaton – recording (track 12)
- Jeff Lane – recording (track 13)
- Brendan Morawaski – recording (track 13)
- Josh Gudwin – recording (track 13)
- Manny Marroquin – mixing (all tracks)
- Chris Galland – mixing (all tracks)
- Lu Diaz – mixing (track 1)
- Chris Athens – mastering (all tracks)
- OP! – engineering (track 5)
- Chris "TEK" O'Ryan – engineering (track 13)
- Ashley Jackson – engineering assistant (track 3)
- Carol Dexter – engineering assistant (track 3)
- Gregg Rominiecki – engineering assistant (track 3), recording (track 14)
- Omar Loya – engineering assistant (track 3)
- Robin Florent – engineering assistant (all tracks)
- Scott Desmarais – engineering assistant (all tracks)
- Jeremie Inhaber – engineering assistant (tracks 1–11, 14, 15)
- Hotae Alexander Jang – vocal engineering (track 7)
- Khaled Khaled – vocal production (tracks 1–4, 6–11, 14, 15)

== Charts ==
=== Weekly charts ===
Chart (2019)	Peak position
Australian Albums (ARIA)	7
Austrian Albums (Ö3 Austria)	11
Belgian Albums (Ultratop Flanders)	10
Belgian Albums (Ultratop Wallonia)	30
Canadian Albums (Billboard)	1
Danish Albums (Hitlisten)	7
Dutch Albums (Album Top 100)	6
Finnish Albums (Suomen virallinen lista)	23
French Albums (SNEP)	28
German Albums (Offizielle Top 100)	23
Irish Albums (IRMA)	14
Italian Albums (FIMI)	44
Japan Hot Albums (Billboard Japan)	68
Latvian Albums (LAIPA)	14
Lithuanian Albums (AGATA)	13
New Zealand Albums (RMNZ)	7
Norwegian Albums (VG-lista)	5
Swedish Albums (Sverigetopplistan)	9
Swiss Albums (Schweizer Hitparade)	12
UK Albums (OCC)	6
UK R&B Albums (OCC)	2
US Billboard 200	2
US Top R&B/Hip-Hop Albums (Billboard)	1

=== Year-end charts ===
Chart (2019)	Position
US Billboard 200	64
US Top R&B/Hip-Hop Albums (Billboard)	35

== Certifications ==
Region	Certification	Certified units/sales
Brazil (Pro-Música Brasil)	Gold	20,000^{‡}
Canada (Music Canada)	Gold	40,000^{‡}
New Zealand (RMNZ)	Gold	7,500^{‡}
United Kingdom (BPI)	Silver	60,000^{‡}
United States (RIAA)	Platinum	1,000,000^{‡}
^{‡} Sales+streaming figures based on certification alone.
