= Wish Wish =

Song by DJ Khaled featuring Cardi B and 21 Savage

from the album Father of Asahd
- Released: May 17, 2019
- Genre: Hip hop; trap
- Length: 3:22
- Label: We the Best; Epic; Roc Nation
- Songwriters: Khaled Khaled; Belcalis Almanzar; Shéyaa Joseph; Brytavious Chambers
- Producers: DJ Khaled; Tay Keith

Music video
- "Wish Wish" on YouTube

"Wish Wish" is a song by American record producer DJ Khaled featuring American rapper Cardi B and Atlanta-based rapper 21 Savage, taken from Khaled's 2019 studio album Father of Asahd. It was released on May 17, 2019, as track two on its parent album. This song marked the second time each artist had worked with another, their firsts being: Cardi B and 21 Savage on "Bartier Cardi" (2017), 21 Savage and DJ Khaled on "Iced Out My Arms" (2017), and DJ Khaled and Cardi B on "Dinero" (2018).

== Critical reception ==
Carl Lamarre of Billboard noted that the song established 21 Savage as a "go-to feature" and that his appearance is met with "unmatched wit". Thomas Hobbs of NME complimented producer Tay Keith, "who consistently takes the aesthetic of John Carpenter horror scores and translates it into hood anthems", while noting Cardi B and 21 Savage "both make an artform out of gross brags". A.D. Amorosi at Variety wrote that Cardi's presence on the song is the most notable and that she elevated it "into a tuneful, spicy trap epic".

== Music video ==
Both collaboration and video were first teased on February 12, 2019. The music video was released on May 20, 2019, along with a series of videos from Khaled's album Father of Asahd. It was directed by Eif Rivera and co-directed by Khaled. The video shows Cardi B dancing in a black catsuit and Chanel swimsuit, as well as joint shots by Khaled and 21 Savage. It also features product placement by Fashion Nova.

== Charts ==
=== Weekly charts ===
Chart (2019)	Peak position
Australia (ARIA)	88
Canada Hot 100 (Billboard)	28
France (SNEP)	129
Greece International Digital Singles (IFPI)	29
New Zealand Hot Singles (RMNZ)	14
Switzerland (Schweizer Hitparade)	90
UK Singles (Official Charts)	81
US Billboard Hot 100	19
US Hot R&B/Hip-Hop Songs (Billboard)	8
US Rhythmic Airplay (Billboard)	8
US Rolling Stone Top 100	88

=== Year-end charts ===
Chart (2019)	Position
US Hot R&B/Hip-Hop Songs (Billboard)	63

== Certifications ==
Region	Certification	Certified units/sales
Australia (ARIA)	Gold	35,000^{‡}
Canada (Music Canada)	Gold	40,000^{‡}
United States (RIAA)	2× Platinum	2,000,000^{‡}
^{‡} Sales+streaming figures based on certification alone.
