= The Keys (book) =

2016 book by DJ Khaled

The Keys: A Memoir is the debut book by musician, producer and music executive DJ Khaled. It was published by Crown Archetype in 2016. It recounts stories from Khaled's life interspersed with lessons and his philosophical opinions on life and success. In an interview with NPR, DJ Khaled explained the book's title, saying "the keys to success, keys to life, you know what I'm saying, keys of winning, keys of joy, keys of happiness. The keys never run out — each key leads to the next key." It includes contributions from other musicians including Jay Z, Fat Joe and Rick Ross.

== Reception ==
It is a New York Times bestseller. Joel Golby of Vice theorized that its upbeat message was "part of a wave of weird 80s wholesomeness that I think we are circling back round to as the world gets meaner and meaner." Andy James of DJBooth wrote that "if you aren't left feeling even remotely inspired to chase your goals and turn those dreams into a reality then you don't have a pulse."
