= For Free =

Single by DJ Khaled featuring Drake

from the album Major Key
- Released: June 3, 2016
- Recorded: 2016
- Genre: Hip-hop
- Length: 3:03
- Label: We the Best; Epic
- Songwriters: Khaled Khaled; Aubrey Graham; Paul Jefferies; Jordan Ullman; Akinyele Adams; Frankie Malave; Jonathan Smith
- Producers: Nineteen85; Ullman; Frankie Cutlass

DJ Khaled singles chronology
"Gold Slugs" (2015)	"For Free" (2016)	"I Got the Keys" (2016)

Drake singles chronology
"Why You Always Hatin?" (2016)	"For Free" (2016)	"Back on Road" (2016)

"For Free" is a song by American disc jockey DJ Khaled, featuring Canadian rapper Drake. It was released on June 3, 2016 by We the Best Music Group and Epic Records as the lead single from DJ Khaled's ninth studio album, Major Key. The song was produced by Nineteen85 and Jordan Ullman and co-produced by Frankie Cutlass. The song was certified 4× Platinum by the Recording Industry Association of America (RIAA) on July 6, 2021, for selling over four million copies in the United States.

== Background ==
On Snapchat, DJ Khaled talked about "the Drake vocals finally [being] in", referencing the then-unreleased song. The hip-hop song, its opening lines and cadences are interpolated from the opening lyrics of Too Short's "Blow the Whistle", produced by Lil Jon, and interpolates Akinyele's "Fuck Me For Free", produced by Frankie Cutlass. One of Drake's verses pays homage to Kendrick Lamar's To Pimp a Butterfly song, "For Free? (Interlude)".

== Chart performance ==
On the chart dated June 25, 2016, "For Free" entered the US Billboard Hot 100 at number 18, powered by first-week digital download sales of 104,748 copies. It became DJ Khaled's fourth highest-charting single, peaking at number 13 on August 20, 2016 (behind 2011's "I'm on One" with Drake, Rick Ross and Lil Wayne and 2017's "Wild Thoughts", with Rihanna and Bryson Tiller and "I'm the One", with Justin Bieber, Quavo, Chance the Rapper, and Lil Wayne). In the United Kingdom, the song peaked at number 25, while peaking at number 47 in Canada and at number 79 in France, making it Khaled's most successful single in those countries until the release of "I'm the One" in the UK and Canada and "Wild Thoughts" in France.

== Charts ==
=== Weekly charts ===
Chart (2016)	Peak position
Australia (ARIA)	70
Canada Hot 100 (Billboard)	47
France (SNEP)	79
Scotland Singles (OCC)	25
UK Singles (OCC)	25
US Billboard Hot 100	13
US Hot R&B/Hip-Hop Songs (Billboard)	4
US Pop Airplay (Billboard)	26
US Rhythmic Airplay (Billboard)	1

=== Year-end charts ===
Chart (2016)	Position
Australia Urban (ARIA)	28
US Billboard Hot 100	59
US Hot R&B/Hip-Hop Songs (Billboard)	16
US Rhythmic (Billboard)	3

== Certifications ==
Region	Certification	Certified units/sales
Canada (Music Canada)	2× Platinum	160,000^{‡}
New Zealand (RMNZ)	Platinum	30,000^{‡}
United Kingdom (BPI)	Gold	400,000^{‡}
United States (RIAA)	4× Platinum	4,000,000^{‡}
^{‡} Sales+streaming figures based on certification alone.

== Release history ==
Region	Date	Format	Label	Ref.
United States	June 3, 2016	Digital download; streaming	We the Best; Epic	
