= No Brainer (song) =

2018 single by DJ Khaled featuring Justin Bieber, Chance the Rapper and Quavo

Single by DJ Khaled featuring Justin Bieber, Chance the Rapper and Quavo

from the album Father of Asahd
- Released: July 27, 2018
- Length: 4:20
- Label: We the Best; Epic
- Songwriters: Khaled Khaled; Justin Bieber; Chancelor Bennett; Quavious Marshall; Nicholas Balding; Jason Boyd; Nolan Lambrozza; Melvin Riley; David Park
- Producers: DJ Khaled; DaviDior; Sir Nolan; Nic Nac; Poo Bear (co.)

DJ Khaled singles chronology
"Dinero" (2018)	"No Brainer" (2018)	"Higher" (2019)

Justin Bieber singles chronology
"Hard 2 Face Reality" (2018)	"No Brainer" (2018)	"I Don't Care" (2019)

Chance the Rapper singles chronology
"I Might Need Security" (2018)	"No Brainer" (2018)	"What's the Hook" (2018)

Quavo singles chronology
"Boo'd Up" (remix) (2018)	"No Brainer" (2018)	"Workin Me" (2018)

Music video
- "No Brainer" on YouTube

"No Brainer" is a song by American musician DJ Khaled featuring Canadian singer Justin Bieber and American rappers Chance the Rapper and Quavo. The song was released on July 27, 2018, by We the Best Music Group and Epic Records, the second single from Khaled's eleventh studio album, Father of Asahd (2019). It marks the second collaboration between the artists, following 2017's "I'm the One" (which also featured Lil Wayne), from Khaled's tenth studio album Grateful. Khaled produced the song with DaviDior, Sir Nolan, Nic Nac and Poo Bear. The song peaked within the top ten of the charts in Australia, New Zealand, Norway, Sweden, Ireland, the United Kingdom, and the United States.

== Release and promotion ==
In early July, DJ Khaled shared plans for his song, inspired by his vacation to Cabo San Lucas. "I'm gonna make my own soap," he said. "So I'm here to announce today—and this is crazy that we're talking about this—I'm gonna make my own soap." He also revealed, "I got a song coming out with Justin Bieber and some more of my great friends on the record. I want it to be a surprise, but it's going to be one of the biggest anthems." In a series of teasers on Instagram, he gradually rolled out the news. In one video, Justin and his manager, Scooter Braun, joined in and showcased their southern accents. "We've always been the best and always will be the best. That's a statement and a half," Bieber teased.

== Critical reception ==
Billboard's Sam Tornow described the song as a potential summer hit with its "all-star cast, bubbly beats and infectious chorus". He wrote: "The crew keeps the hype up all the way through, from Bieber's first chorus until his last. Every collaborator holds his own, accenting each other's different styles while still popping off during his own verse." Conversely, Sheldon Pearce of Pitchfork called the song "gratuitous fun that's derivative and shiftless and capitalistic".

== Chart performance ==
In the United States, the song debuted at number five on the US Billboard Hot 100, making it Khaled's fourth top-ten song, Bieber's 14th, Chance the Rapper notches his second and Quavo posts his fifth top ten on the chart. The song dropped to number 11 in its second week on the chart.

In the United Kingdom, "No Brainer" debuted at number one on the Official Trending Chart following its release, with the song set to debut at number 9 of the chart regardless of any added points. In August 2018, the song opened at number four on the UK Singles Chart, where it became DJ Khaled's third and Bieber's 14th top-five single in the country. As for other countries, the song reached the top ten of the charts of Australia, New Zealand, Norway, Sweden and Ireland.

== Music video ==
The music video premiered via YouTube an hour after the song's release. Directed by Colin Tilley, the video begins on the set of a movie in Hollywood with "We The Best" replacing the typical white Hollywood Sign. Bieber helms the director chair alongside Khaled and his son, Asahd. One part of the video is highly reminiscent of a scene from the film Wayne's World, as Khaled and Justin stand atop the faux clouds. Product placement is heavily displayed throughout the blockbuster, boasting different liquors from Bumbu to Ciroc and Belaire. Quavo injects himself into the colorful scene taking on the role of an artist, meticulously painting away at his blank canvas with a parrot mysteriously chilling out on his shoulder. Chance is the last of the co-stars to make an appearance, and the setting immediately switches to a Gatsby-themed party, as the squad dances the night away.

== Personnel ==
Credits adapted from Tidal.

- DJ Khaled – vocals, production
- Justin Bieber – vocals
- Chance the Rapper – vocals
- Quavo – vocals
- DaviDior – production
- Sir Nolan – production
- Benjamin Fekete – production
- Nic Nac – production
- Poo Bear – co-production
- Skrt – mix engineering
- Chris O'Ryan – engineering
- Chris Galland – engineering
- Scott Desmarais – engineering assistance
- Robin Florent – engineering assistance
- Jeff Lane – record engineering
- Josh Gudwin – record engineering
- Juan "Wize" Peña – record engineering
- Brendan Morawaski – record engineering

== Charts ==
=== Weekly charts ===
Chart (2018)	Peak position
Argentina Anglo (Monitor Latino)	18
Australia (ARIA)	6
Austria (Ö3 Austria Top 40)	7
Belgium (Ultratop 50 Flanders)	24
Belgium (Ultratop 50 Wallonia)	33
Bolivia (Monitor Latino)	16
Brazil International Pop Songs (Crowley Charts)	10
Canada Hot 100 (Billboard)	4
Canada CHR/Top 40 (Billboard)	5
Canada Hot AC (Billboard)	32
Colombia (National-Report)	68
Croatia (HRT)	54
Czech Republic Singles Digital (ČNS IFPI)	10
Denmark (Tracklisten)	1
Finland (Suomen virallinen lista)	11
France (SNEP)	59
Germany (GfK)	15
Greece (IFPI)	15
Hungary (Single Top 40)	6
Hungary (Stream Top 40)	11
Ireland (IRMA)	4
Italy (FIMI)	33
Japan Hot 100 (Billboard)	29
Lebanon (OLT20)	7
Malaysia (RIM)	13
Mexico (Billboard Mexican Airplay)	24
Netherlands (Dutch Top 40)	17
Netherlands (Single Top 100)	16
New Zealand (Recorded Music NZ)	2
Norway (VG-lista)	4
Portugal (AFP)	13
Romania (Airplay 100)	67
Scottish Singles Sales (Official Charts)	17
Singapore (RIAS)	5
Slovakia Airplay (ČNS IFPI)	91
Slovakia Singles Digital (ČNS IFPI)	6
South Korea International (Gaon)	32
Spain (Promusicae)	65
Sweden (Sverigetopplistan)	4
Switzerland (Schweizer Hitparade)	12
UK Singles (Official Charts)	3
UK Hip Hop/R&B (Official Charts)	2
US Billboard Hot 100	5
US Adult Pop Airplay (Billboard)	27
US Dance Club Songs (Billboard)	54
US Dance Airplay (Billboard)	7
US Hot R&B/Hip-Hop Songs (Billboard)	4
US Pop Airplay (Billboard)	7
US Rhythmic Airplay (Billboard)	1

=== Year-end charts ===
Chart (2018)	Position
Australia (ARIA)	83
Canada (Canadian Hot 100)	65
Denmark (Tracklisten)	77
Portugal (AFP)	148
UK Singles (Official Charts Company)	100
US Billboard Hot 100	73
US Hot R&B/Hip-Hop Songs (Billboard)	38
US Mainstream Top 40 (Billboard)	36
US Rhythmic (Billboard)	29

== Certifications ==
Region	Certification	Certified units/sales
Australia (ARIA)	4× Platinum	280,000^{‡}
Austria (IFPI Austria)	Gold	15,000^{‡}
Brazil (Pro-Música Brasil)	3× Platinum	120,000^{‡}
Canada (Music Canada)	3× Platinum	240,000^{‡}
Denmark (IFPI Danmark)	Platinum	90,000^{‡}
France (SNEP)	Gold	100,000^{‡}
Italy (FIMI)	Gold	25,000^{‡}
Mexico (AMPROFON)	Gold	30,000^{‡}
New Zealand (RMNZ)	2× Platinum	60,000^{‡}
Norway (IFPI Norway)	Platinum	60,000^{‡}
Poland (ZPAV)	Gold	10,000^{‡}
United Kingdom (BPI)	Platinum	600,000^{‡}
United States (RIAA)	3× Platinum	3,000,000^{‡}
^{‡} Sales+streaming figures based on certification alone.

== Release history ==
Region	Date	Format	Label	Ref.
Various	July 27, 2018	Digital download; streaming	We the Best; Epic	
Italy	July 30, 2018	Contemporary hit radio	Sony	
United States	July 31, 2018	Rhythmic contemporary	We the Best; Epic	
United Kingdom	August 10, 2018	Contemporary hit radio	RCA	
