= Major Key (album) =

Studio album by DJ Khaled
- Released: July 29, 2016
- Recorded: 2015–16
- Genres: Hip-hop; trap; R&B
- Length: 57:53
- Labels: We the Best; Epic
- Producers: DJ Khaled (exec.); 808-Ray; Ben Billions; The Beat Bully; Cool & Dre; DJ Nasty & LVM; Dyryk; Edsclusive; Frank Dukes; G Koop; Hollywood JB; Jake One; Jordan Ullman; Kent Jones; Key Wane; Lee on the Beats; Meghan Trainor; Metro Boomin; Frankie Cutlass; Michael Foster; Mineral Boss Productions; Nineteen85; Qolorsound; Southside; TBHits; Travis Sayles; Travis Scott

DJ Khaled chronology
I Changed a Lot (2015)	Major Key (2016)	Grateful (2017)

Singles from Major Key
- 1. "For Free" Released: June 3, 2016; 2. "I Got the Keys" Released: July 4, 2016; 3. "Holy Key" Released: July 22, 2016; 4. "Do You Mind" Released: July 28, 2016

Major Key (stylized as Major 🔑) is the ninth studio album by American disc jockey and record producer DJ Khaled. It was released on July 29, 2016, by We the Best Music Group and Epic Records. The album features guest appearances from Jay-Z, Future, Drake, Nas, Big Sean, Kendrick Lamar, Betty Wright, J. Cole, Bryson Tiller, Nicki Minaj, Chris Brown, August Alsina, Jeremih, Rick Ross, Kodak Black, Jeezy, French Montana, YG, Yo Gotti, Gucci Mane, 2 Chainz, Jadakiss, Fabolous, Fat Joe, Busta Rhymes, Kent Jones, Travis Scott, Lil Wayne, Meghan Trainor, Wiz Khalifa, Wale, and Mavado.

Major Key was supported by four singles: "For Free", "I Got the Keys", "Holy Key" and "Do You Mind". The album received generally positive reviews from critics and debuted at number one on the US Billboard 200. It was certified gold by the Recording Industry Association of America (RIAA) in November 2016, and later platinum on September 27, 2019. Furthermore, it received a Grammy Award nomination for Best Rap Album.

== Background ==
In late 2015, Khaled became popular on Snapchat, sharing his advice that he calls his "keys to success", utilizing the 'key' emoji as a symbol of his knowledge.

== Release and promotion ==
On April 12, 2016, DJ Khaled announced that he has signed a record deal to Epic Records. He also made the announcement that the title to the album would be called Major Key. On April 18, DJ Khaled joined Beyoncé on her The Formation World Tour. On Twitter, Future hinted that the song with DJ Khaled and Jay-Z was going to be a single for the album. On May 28, 2016, DJ Khaled shot and posted a photo for the album cover artwork, featuring him sitting on a throne, and a bunch of flowers surrounding him and a live lion.

== Recording and production ==
In an interview with DJ Whoo Kid, record producer Southside revealed that he was producing a song for DJ Khaled, Jay-Z and Future's single. In an interview with Entertainment Weekly, DJ Khaled spoke about the album and revealing on who the guest appearances stated "I've got another record with me, Future, and Jay Z. I want to clarify and make sure everybody knows that I have two verses from Jay Z on this record with me and Future. Amongst other artists, me and Kanye West, we talking right now about making something special. Me and Rick Ross. Ross is definitely on the album. Lil Wayne, Big Sean, Chris Brown, August Alsina, Travis Scott, the list goes on." He also hinted that he was going to collaborate with artists such as Mariah Carey and Drake on his Snapchat and Instagram. DJ Khaled slated that the album would have no more than 14 songs.

== Singles ==
The official lead single from Major Key, "For Free", was released on June 3, 2016. The song features a guest appearance from Canadian rapper Drake, with production by Nineteen85 and Jordan Ullman, co produced by Frankie Cutlass. The track premiered on Beats 1, during an interview with Zane Lowe and Khaled.

The official second single from Major Key, "I Got the Keys", was released on June 4, 2016. The song features guest appearances from American rappers Future and Jay-Z, with production by Southside, Jake One and G Koop. The music video was released after the 2016 BET Awards.

On July 22, 2016, DJ Khaled would premiered his third single from the album, "Holy Key" featuring Kendrick Lamar, Big Sean and Betty Wright, during episode 24 of his primetime radio show We The Best Radio on Beats 1 radio.

"Do You Mind" featuring Nicki Minaj, Chris Brown, August Alsina, Jeremih, Future and Rick Ross, was released as the fourth single on July 28, 2016.

== Critical reception ==
Professional ratings
Aggregate scores
Source	Rating
AnyDecentMusic?	6.1/10
Metacritic	67/100
Review scores
Source	Rating
AllMusic	3.5/5 stars
Consequence of Sound	B−
Entertainment Weekly	B+
Exclaim!	4/10
HipHopDX	3.2/5
Pitchfork	6.9/10
PopMatters	6/10
RapReviews.com	7/10
Rolling Stone	3/5 stars
Spin	6/10

Major Key received generally positive reviews from critics. At Metacritic, which assigns a normalized rating out of 100 to reviews from mainstream publications, the album received an average score of 67, based on 11 reviews. Andy Kellman of AllMusic said, "The contrast between Khaled's all-positive demeanor and his facilitation of buccaneering misogyny is stark as ever here, most evident in tracks like "Work It" and "Pick These Hoes Apart"." KC Orcutt of Consequence of Sound said, "As might be expected from a record this big with a rolodex this wide-ranging, Major Key is an absolutely mixed bag. Khaled utilizes full-speed-ahead intensity, big room trap, and syrupy R&B, all without leaving room to breathe. But then again, Khaled's presence unifies Major Key." Nolan Feeney of Entertainment Weekly said, "His bottomless stock of anthemic crowd-pleasers may not be game-changing, but few albums this year have come preloaded with this many obvious singles." Scott Glaysher of HipHopDX said, "There are instances on this album that do prove Khaled's worth as a Hip Hop orchestrator in terms of matching high profile rappers with quality beats but unfortunately, they come too few and far between." Kris Ex of Pitchfork said, "Like all of his albums, Major Key is a mixed bag, fitting for a maestro who traffics in a blend of chest-thumping and humility that's both as comical as it is prophetic."

Steve "Flash" Juon of RapReviews.com said, "If you're not expecting an hour of profound wisdom from start to finish this is an ideal late summer mixtape to ride around to." A. Harmony of Exclaim! said, "It starts off deceptively strong, with standouts like "I Got the Keys", "Nas Album Done" and "For Free" all loaded near the beginning. But once the album advances past this bit of clever sequencing, it barely strikes a chord." Michael G. Barilleaux of No Ripcord said, "The production on this album is bearable and more or less gets the job done, but is mostly composed of bothersome loops. This leaves the bulk of the work to the emcees. And quite frankly, some show up, and some most certainly do not." Nathaniel Schwass of PopMatters said, "While Major Key proves that DJ Khaled is not simply a meme, Khaled swings too hard and misses too often with each attempt at a radio hit." Christopher R. Weingarten of Rolling Stone said, "As with every Khaled LP, the end result is a blast in small doses but a little bludgeoning taken as a whole." Matthew Ramirez of Spin said, "The problem with the fantasy of a major Khaled Album though, is that, like a summer blockbuster, Major Key is too front-loaded."

=== Accolades ===
Year-end lists
Publication	List	Rank
Complex	The 50 Best Albums of 2016	48
XXL	50 Best Hip-Hop Projects of 2016	50

Awards
Ceremony	Category	Result
2017 Grammy Awards	Best Rap Album	Nominated

== Commercial performance ==
In its home country of the United States, Major Key debuted at number one on the US Billboard 200 for the week ending August 20, 2016, with 96,000 equivalent album units, marking Khaled's first number one album. While it was the best-selling album of the week, selling 59,000 copies in its first week. The album sales launch is DJ Khaled's second-biggest first week in his career, behind We the Best (2007). In its second week, the album remained in the top ten at Billboard 200, fell to number seven, with 43,000 equivalent album units, it sold 12,000 copies. On September 27, 2019, Major Key was certified platinum by the Recording Industry Association of America (RIAA).

== Track listing ==
No.	Title	Writer(s)	Producer(s)	Length
1.	"I Got the Keys" (featuring Jay-Z and Future)	Khaled Khaled; Shawn Carter; Nayvadius Wilburn; Joshua Luellen; Jacob Dutton; Robert Mandell	Southside; DJ Khaled; Jake One^{[a]}; G Koop^{[a]}	3:39
2.	"For Free" (featuring Drake)	K. Khaled; Aubrey Graham; Kenneth Grant; Kacy Brooks; Majid Jordan; LaMarquis Jefferson; Akinyele Adams; Frankie Malave; Craig David; James Phillips; Todd Shaw; Jonathan Smith	Ullman	3:03
3.	"Nas Album Done" (featuring Nas)	K. Khaled; Nasir Jones; Rayshon Cobbs, Jr.; Marcelo Valenzano; Andre Lyon; Jean Michaels; Velisha Brockert; Lauryn Hill; Wyclef Jean; Pras Michel; Salaam Gibbs; Mary Brockert; Allen McGrier	DJ Khaled; 808-Ray; Cool & Dre	3:16
4.	"Holy Key" (featuring Big Sean, Kendrick Lamar and Betty Wright)	K. Khaled; Sean Anderson; Kendrick Duckworth; Bessie Norris; Edward Davadi; Valenzano; Lyon; Giuseppe Donaggio; Vito Pallavicini	DJ Khaled; Edsclusive; Cool & Dre	4:41
5.	"Jermaine's Interlude" (featuring J. Cole)	K. Khaled; Jermaine Cole; Justin Bryant; Piero Piccioni	Hollywood JB	3:03
6.	"Ima Be Alright" (featuring Bryson Tiller and Future)	K. Khaled; Bryson Tiller; Wilburn; Anthony Tucker; Maurice Jordan	The Beat Bully; DJ Khaled	4:06
7.	"Do You Mind" (featuring Nicki Minaj, Chris Brown, August Alsina, Jeremih, Future and Rick Ross)	K. Khaled; Onika Maraj; Chris Brown; August Alsina; Jeremy Felton; Wilburn; William Roberts II; Michael Johnson; Johnny Mollings; Leonardo Mollings; Anthony Norris; Sean McMillion; Ralph Jeanty; Kevin Cossom	DJ Khaled; DJ Nasty & LVM^{[a]}; Lee on the Beats^{[a]}	5:25
8.	"Pick These Hoes Apart" (featuring Kodak Black, Jeezy and French Montana)	K. Khaled; Dieuson Octave; Jay Jenkins; Karim Kharbouch; Benjamin Diehl; Derek Garcia; Cossom	Ben Billions; Dyryk; DJ Khaled^{[a]}	4:51
9.	"Fuck Up the Club" (featuring Future, Rick Ross, YG and Yo Gotti)	K. Khaled; Wilburn; Roberts; Keenon Jackson; Mario Mims; Eric Kovacs; Valenzano; Lyons	DJ Khaled; Qolorsound; Cool & Dre	3:51
10.	"Work for It" (featuring Big Sean, Gucci Mane and 2 Chainz)	K. Khaled; Anderson; Radric Davis; Tauheed Epps; Leland Wayne; Adam Feeney; Jermaine Dupri; Usher Raymond IV; Manuel Seal, Jr.	Metro Boomin; Frank Dukes	4:50
11.	"Don't Ever Play Yourself" (featuring Jadakiss, Fabolous, Fat Joe, Busta Rhymes and Kent Jones)	K. Khaled; Jason Phillips; John Jackson; Joe Cartagena; Trevor Smith, Jr.; Daryl Jones; Kovacs; Valenzano; Lyon	DJ Khaled; Qolorsound; Cool & Dre	5:31
12.	"Tourist" (featuring Travis Scott and Lil Wayne)	K. Khaled; Jacques Webster II; Dwayne Carter, Jr.; Dwane Weir II	Key Wane; Travis Scott	4:33
13.	"Forgive Me Father" (featuring Meghan Trainor, Wiz Khalifa and Wale)	K. Khaled; Meghan Trainor; Cameron Thomaz; Olubowale Akintimehin; Thomas Lee Brown; Travis Sayles; Michael Foster	TBHits; Sayles; Foster; Trainor; DJ Khaled^{[a]}	4:06
14.	"Progress" (performed by Mavado)	K. Khaled; David C. Brooks; Clem Jones; Tawanna Jones	Mineral Boss Productions	2:58
Total length:				57:53

Track notes

- ^{^a} signifies a co-producer
- "Jermaine's Interlude" contains additional vocals from EarthGang and JID

Sample credits

- "For Free" contains interpolations of "Fuck Me For Free", performed by Akinyele; reused lyrics from "Blow the Whistle", performed by Too Short; and resung lyrics from "For Free? (Interlude)", performed by Kendrick Lamar.
- "Nas Album Done" contains a sample of "Fu-Gee-La", performed by Fugees.
- "Holy Key" contains a sample of "So Tired", performed by The Chambers Brothers.
- "Jermaine's Interlude" contains a sample of "It's Possible", composed by Piero Piccioni.
- "Do You Mind" contains samples of "Lovers & Friends", performed by Lil Jon & the East Side Boyz featuring Usher and Ludacris; and "Money Ain't a Thang", performed by Jermaine Dupri featuring Jay-Z.
- "Work for It" contains a sample of "Pop Style", performed by Drake featuring The Throne.

== Personnel ==
Artists

- DJ Khaled – primary artist (all tracks)
- Future – featured artist (tracks 1, 6, 7, 9)
- Big Sean – featured artist (tracks 4, 10)
- Rick Ross – featured artist (tracks 7, 9)
- Jay-Z – featured artist (track 1)
- Drake – featured artist (track 2)
- Nas – featured artist (track 3)
- Kendrick Lamar – featured artist (track 4)
- Betty Wright – featured artist (track 4)
- J. Cole – featured artist (track 5)
- Bryson Tiller – featured artist (track 6)
- Nicki Minaj – featured artist (track 7)
- Chris Brown – featured artist (track 7)
- August Alsina – featured artist (track 7)
- Jeremih – featured artist (track 7)
- Kodak Black – featured artist (track 8)
- Jeezy – featured artist (track 8)
- French Montana – featured artist (track 8)
- YG – featured artist (track 9)
- Yo Gotti – featured artist (track 9)
- Gucci Mane – featured artist (track 10)
- 2 Chainz – featured artist (track 10)
- Jadakiss – featured artist (track 11)
- Fabolous – featured artist (track 11)
- Fat Joe – featured artist (track 11)
- Busta Rhymes – featured artist (track 11)
- Kent Jones – featured artist (track 11)
- Travis Scott – featured artist (track 12)
- Lil Wayne – featured artist (track 12)
- Meghan Trainor – featured artist (track 13)
- Wiz Khalifa – featured artist (track 13)
- Wale – featured artist (track 13)
- Mavado – featured artist (track 14)
- EarthGang – background artist (track 5)
- JID – background artist (track 5)

Technical personnel

- Noah "40" Shebib – recording (track 2)
- Peter "Zlender" Vickers – assistant mixer (track 1)

Record producers

- DJ Khaled – production (tracks 1, 3, 4, 6, 7, 8, 9, 11, 13)
- Cool & Dre – production (tracks 3, 4, 9, 11)
- Qolorsound – production (tracks 9, 11)
- Metro Boomin – production (track 10)
- Frank Dukes – production (track 10)
- Southside – production (track 1)
- Jake One – production (track 1)
- Key Wane – production (track 12)
- Travis Scott – production (track 12)
- TBHits – production (track 13)
- DJ Nasty & LVM – production (track 7)
- Lee on the Beats – production (track 7)
- The Beat Bully – production (track 6)
- Nineteen85 – production (track 2)
- Jordan Ullman – production (track 2)
- Meghan Trainor – production (track 13)
- 808-Ray – production (track 3)
- G Koop – production (track 1)
- Edsclusive – production (track 4)
- Hollywood JB – production (track 5)
- Ben Billions – production (track 8)
- Travis Sayles – production (track 13)
- Dyryk – production (track 8)
- Michael Foster – production (track 13)
- Mineral Boss Productions – production (track 14)
- Frankie Cutlass – production (track 2)

== Charts ==
=== Weekly charts ===
Chart (2016)	Peak position
Australian Albums (ARIA)	6
Austrian Albums (Ö3 Austria)	30
Belgian Albums (Ultratop Flanders)	15
Belgian Albums (Ultratop Wallonia)	43
Canadian Albums (Billboard)	3
Dutch Albums (Album Top 100)	38
French Albums (SNEP)	54
Irish Albums (IRMA)	36
New Zealand Albums (RMNZ)	15
Norwegian Albums (VG-lista)	32
Scottish Albums (Official Charts)	40
Swedish Albums (Sverigetopplistan)	58
Swiss Albums (Schweizer Hitparade)	97
UK Albums (Official Charts)	7
UK Album Downloads (Official Charts)	5
UK R&B Albums (Official Charts)	1
US Billboard 200	1
US Top R&B/Hip-Hop Albums (Billboard)	1

=== Year-end charts ===
Chart (2016)	Position
US Billboard 200	76
US Top R&B/Hip-Hop Albums (Billboard)	25

== Certifications ==
Region	Certification	Certified units/sales
Canada (Music Canada)	Gold	40,000^{‡}
New Zealand (RMNZ)	Gold	7,500^{‡}
United States (RIAA)	Platinum	1,000,000^{‡}
^{‡} Sales+streaming figures based on certification alone.
