= Just Us (DJ Khaled song) =

Single by DJ Khaled featuring SZA

from the album Father of Asahd
- Released: May 17, 2019
- Recorded: 2019
- Genre: R&B
- Length: 3:41
- Label: We the Best; Epic; Roc Nation
- Songwriters: Antwan Patton; Brittany Coney; David Sheats; Denisia Andrews; Khaled Khaled; Solána Rowe; André Benjamin
- Producer: DJ Khaled

DJ Khaled singles chronology
"Higher" (2019)	"Just Us" (2019)	"You Stay" (2019)

SZA singles chronology
"Power Is Power" (2019)	"Just Us" (2019)	"The Other Side" (2020)

Music video
- "Just Us" on YouTube

"Just Us" is a song by American producer DJ Khaled featuring American singer-songwriter SZA from Khaled's 2019 album Father of Asahd. It was serviced to contemporary hit radio on May 21, 2019, as the fourth single off the album. The song samples Outkast's "Ms. Jackson".

== Critical reception ==
Thomas Hobbs of NME praised SZA's performance on the song and described it as "mixtape freestyle". A.D. Amorosi of Variety called the track "simmering" and stated that the song sounds out of place on a DJ Khaled album.

== Music video ==
On April 15, 2019, Khaled first teased the video on Instagram. It was released on May 17, 2019, along with a video of "Higher", which also appears on the album. It was directed by Joseph Kahn.

== Charts ==
=== Weekly charts ===
Chart (2019)	Peak position
Australia (ARIA)	32
Belgium (Ultratip Bubbling Under Flanders)	34
Belgium (Ultratip Bubbling Under Wallonia)	47
Canada Hot 100 (Billboard)	65
France Downloads (SNEP)	155
Ireland (IRMA)	52
Lithuania (AGATA)	65
New Zealand (Recorded Music NZ)	25
Romania (Airplay 100)	69
Slovakia Singles Digital (ČNS IFPI)	73
Sweden Heatseeker (Sverigetopplistan)	1
Switzerland (Schweizer Hitparade)	81
UK Singles (Official Charts)	66
US Billboard Hot 100	43
US Hot R&B/Hip-Hop Songs (Billboard)	18
US Pop Airplay (Billboard)	20
US R&B/Hip-Hop Airplay (Billboard)	16
US Rhythmic Airplay (Billboard)	3

=== Year-end charts ===
Chart (2019)	Position
US Hot R&B/Hip-Hop Songs (Billboard)	68
US Rhythmic (Billboard)	32

== Certifications ==
Region	Certification	Certified units/sales
Australia (ARIA)	Platinum	70,000^{‡}
Canada (Music Canada)	Gold	40,000^{‡}
New Zealand (RMNZ)	2× Platinum	60,000^{‡}
United Kingdom (BPI)	Silver	200,000^{‡}
United States (RIAA)	2× Platinum	2,000,000^{‡}
^{‡} Sales+streaming figures based on certification alone.

== Release history ==
Region	Date	Format	Label	Ref.
United States	May 21, 2019	Contemporary hit radio	We the Best; Epic; Roc Nation	
United States	May 21, 2019	Rhythmic contemporary	We the Best; Epic; Roc Nation	
United States	May 21, 2019	Urban contemporary	We the Best; Epic; Roc Nation	
