= Higher (DJ Khaled song) =

Single by DJ Khaled featuring Nipsey Hussle and John Legend

from the album Father of Asahd
- Released: May 17, 2019
- Recorded: 2018–2019
- Genre: Hip hop; Gospel; R&B
- Length: 2:56
- Label: We the Best; Epic; Roc Nation
- Songwriters: Ermias Asghedom; HM Henry Davis; John Stephens; Kevin Cossom; Khaled Khaled
- Producers: DJ Khaled; Streetrunner; Tarik Azzouz

DJ Khaled singles chronology
"No Brainer" (2018)	"Higher" (2019)	"Just Us" (2019)

Nipsey Hussle singles chronology
"Racks in the Middle" (2019)	"Higher" (2019)	"Unified" (2019)

John Legend singles chronology
"Preach" (2019)	"Higher" (2019)	"We Need Love" (2019)

Music video
- "Higher ft. Nipsey Hussle, John Legend" on YouTube

"Higher" is a song by American producer DJ Khaled featuring American rapper Nipsey Hussle and American singer John Legend, released as the third single from DJ Khaled's album Father of Asahd on May 17, 2019. The music video was filmed before Hussle's death on March 31, 2019. Legend plays piano on the track and sings its chorus. DJ Khaled announced that all proceeds from sales of the song will go to the rapper's children. Complex magazine ranked Hussle's verse on the song as the best on the album. The song received a Grammy award for Best Rap/Sung Performance at the 62nd Grammy Awards, marking DJ Khaled's first Grammy win and Hussle's second of the night.

== Background ==
DJ Khaled called the song's creation part of an "emotional journey", saying Nipsey Hussle "shared his energy and positivity" with him before his death. The pair went out to lunch together and Khaled played Hussle the beat of the song. He left to give Hussle some "space", then came back in to find him writing lyrics.

In a post shared to social media, DJ Khaled revealed that profits from sales of the song will be given to Nipsey Hussle's son and daughter. He also said that the title "reminds us that vibrating on a 'Higher' level was the essence of Nipsey's soul".

== Music video ==
The music video was released at midnight EST on May 17, 2019. TMZ previously shared a clip of the track, which showed "Legend on the keys and Nipsey rhyming next to a pair of low-rider convertibles bouncing in the air".

== Charts ==
Chart (2019)	Peak position
Canada Hot 100 (Billboard)	40
Ireland (IRMA)	72
UK Singles (OCC)	48
US Billboard Hot 100	21
US Hot R&B/Hip-Hop Songs (Billboard)	9

== Certifications ==
Region	Certification	Certified units/sales
United States (RIAA)	Gold	500,000^{‡}
^{‡} Sales+streaming figures based on certification alone.
