= Emergency Contact (novel) =

2018 young adult novel by Mary H.K. Choi

- First edition cover
- Author: Mary H.K. Choi
- Audio read by: Joy Osmanski; Jacques Roy
- Cover artist: ohgigue (illustration); Lizzy Bromley (design)
- Language: English
- Genre: Young adult novel
- Set in: Austin, Texas, U.S.
- Publisher: Simon & Schuster Books for Young Readers
- Publication date: March 27, 2018
- Publication place: United States
- Media type: Print (hardcover and paperback)
- Pages: 400
- ISBN: 978-1-5344-0896-8 (hardcover)
- Dewey Decimal: [Fic]
- LC Class: PZ7.1.C5316 Eme 2018

Emergency Contact is a 2018 young adult novel by Mary H.K. Choi. It is her debut novel and was published on March 27, 2018 by Simon & Schuster Books for Young Readers, an imprint of Simon & Schuster. Emergency Contact is a love story conducted primarily by text message, with Penny, a Korean-American freshman at the University of Texas at Austin, giving Sam her number after she happens to be passing by as Sam has his first panic attack.

== Background ==
Choi described the novel as partly inspired by Judy Blume's novel Forever..., because Blume had "said she just wanted to write a story about 'two people who have sex but then nothing terrible happens'...I love that," Choi told The New York Times.

== Publication ==
On October 4, 2017, an excerpt of the novel was published through Entertainment Weekly. Emergency Contact was published in hardcover on March 27, 2018 by Simon & Schuster Books for Young Readers, an imprint of Simon & Schuster. A paperback edition was published on April 9, 2019 by Simon & Schuster Books for Young Readers.

The novel debuted at number nine on The New York Times Young Adult Hardcover best-sellers list on April 22, 2018. It peaked at number eight on the list on May 6, 2018. It spent four weeks on the list.

== Reception ==
Publishers Weekly, in a starred review, praised Choi's "sharp wit and skillful character development".

Kirkus Reviews criticized the novel's character development as well as its "absence of emotional depth or well-crafted prose".

Writing for Entertainment Weekly, David Canfield wrote that the novel "vividly realizes Korean-American culture and explores microaggressions on a sharply recognizable level" and wrote that the young adult "frame doesn't push the more challenging material to the margins, but rather renders it naturalistically potent".
