= I Got the Keys =

Single by DJ Khaled featuring Jay-Z and Future

from the album Major Key
- Released: July 4, 2016
- Recorded: 2016
- Genre: Trap
- Length: 3:39
- Label: We the Best; Epic
- Songwriters: Khaled Khaled; Shawn Carter; Nayvadius Wilburn; M. Serbest; Joshua Luellen; Jacob Dutton; Robert Mandell
- Producers: Southside; DJ Khaled; 808 Mafia; Jake One; G Koop

DJ Khaled singles chronology
"For Free" (2016)	"I Got the Keys" (2016)	"Holy Key" (2016)

Jay-Z singles chronology
"Drug Dealers Anonymous" (2016)	"I Got the Keys" (2016)	"Shining" (2017)

Future singles chronology
"Wicked" (2016)	"I Got the Keys" (2016)	"Campaign" (2016)

Music video
- "I Got the Keys" on YouTube

"I Got the Keys" is a song by American musician DJ Khaled featuring American rappers Jay-Z and Future. It was released on July 4, 2016 by We the Best Music Group and Epic Records as the second single of Khaled's ninth studio album, Major Key (2016). In December 2016, the song was certified Platinum by the Recording Industry Association of America (RIAA), for selling over a million digital copies in the United States.

== Music video ==
The song's music video premiered after the BET Awards on June 26, 2016. The video features cameo appearances by Rick Ross, 2 Chainz, Pusha T, ASAP Ferg, T.I., Swizz Beatz, Busta Rhymes, Fabolous, Yo Gotti, Bryson Tiller and Zoey Dollaz.

== Track listing ==
Digital download
No.	Title	Length
1.	"I Got the Keys" (featuring Jay-Z and Future)	3:39

== Charts ==
=== Weekly charts ===
Chart (2016)	Peak position
Canada Hot 100 (Billboard)	55
France (SNEP)	125
Germany (GfK)	95
UK Singles (Official Charts)	149
US Billboard Hot 100	30
US Hot R&B/Hip-Hop Songs (Billboard)	9
US Rhythmic Airplay (Billboard)	20

=== Year-end charts ===
Chart (2016)	Position
US Hot R&B/Hip-Hop Songs (Billboard)	42

== Certifications ==
Region	Certification	Certified units/sales
Canada (Music Canada)	Platinum	80,000^{‡}
United States (RIAA)	Platinum	1,000,000^{‡}
^{‡} Sales+streaming figures based on certification alone.

== Release history ==
Region	Date	Format	Label	Ref.
United States	July 4, 2016	Digital download; streaming	We the Best; Epic	
United Kingdom	July 15, 2016	Rhythmic contemporary	We the Best; Epic	
