= 2013 BET Hip Hop Awards =

Annual edition for the awards show

- Date: October 15, 2013
- Location: Atlanta Civic Center
- Hosted by: Snoop Dogg

Television/radio coverage
- Network: BET

The 2013 BET Hip Hop Awards was held on October 15, 2013 at Atlanta Civic Center in the ATL. Snoop Dogg was the event's host for the first time. Kendrick Lamar leads the nominations with 14. Drake had the second most at 13, while J. Cole picked up 10 nods. Kendrick Lamar won the most awards with 5 wins.

There was some controversy as Toronto battle rapper Charron won Freestyle Friday's March Mayhem Tournament, which guaranteed him a spot in the 2013 BET Hip Hop Awards cypher as one of the prizes for his victory. However, once it came time to film the cyphers, Charron was excluded. He responded with the "BET Cypher Verse" where he disses BET, Murda Mook, Gucci Mane, Soulja Boy, Lil Twist, Rick Ross, Kendrick Lamar and Chief Keef, among others.

== Performances ==
- "Dreams and Nightmares"/"Levels" – Meek Mill
- "Act Right"/"U.O.E.N.O."/"Type of Way" – Yo Gotti, Rocko & Rich Homie Quan
- "Fork"/"Go DJ"/"Used 2"/"Back That Azz Up" – 2 Chainz feat. Mannie Fresh & Juvenile
- "Honest"/"I Wanna Be with You"/"No Games" – Future, DJ Khaled, & Rick Ross
- "Collard Greens"/"Money Trees" – Schoolboy Q, Kendrick Lamar & Jay Rock
- "Ain't Worried About Nothin'" (Remix) – French Montana feat. Diddy, Snoop Dogg & Rick Ross
- "Thuggish Ruggish Bone"/"1st of tha Month"/"Crossroads" – Bone Thugs-N-Harmony feat. Claudette Ortiz

== Cyphers ==
- Internet Exclusive Cypher – Asia Sparks, La ' Vega, Bad Lucc, Problem, & Astro
- Cypher 1 – Wax, Rapsody, Emis Killa, Rittz, & Jon Connor
- Cypher 2 – ASAP Ferg, ASAP Twelvy, ASAP Nast, ASAP Ant, & ASAP Rocky of ASAP Mob
- Cypher 3 – Action Bronson, Star Life Breezy, Travis Scott, Tiffany Foxx, & Lil' Kim
- Cypher 4 – Slaughterhouse (Joell Ortiz, Royce da 5'9", Crooked I, & Joe Budden)
- Cypher 5 – ScHoolboy Q, Jay Rock, Ab-Soul, Isaiah Rashad, & Kendrick Lamar of Top Dawg Entertainment
- Cypher 6 – J. B. Smoove, Duane Martin, Boris Kodjoe, Nick Cannon, Nelly, & Chocolate Drop (a.k.a. Kevin Hart) of Real Husbands of Hollywood

== Nominations ==
=== Best Hip Hop Video ===
Drake – "Started From the Bottom"

- A$AP Rocky featuring Drake, 2 Chainz & Kendrick Lamar – "Problems"
- B.o.B featuring T.I. & Juicy J – "We Still In This"
- J. Cole featuring Miguel – "Power Trip"
- Kendrick Lamar – "Don't Kill My Vibe"

=== Reese's Perfect Combo Award (Best Collabo, Duo or Group) ===
A$AP Rocky featuring Drake, 2 Chainz & Kendrick Lamar – "Problems"

- Ace Hood featuring Rick Ross & Future – "Bugatti"
- J. Cole featuring Miguel – "Power Trip"
- French Montana featuring Rick Ross, Drake & Lil Wayne – "Pop That"
- Kendrick Lamar featuring Drake – "Poetic Justice"
- Wale featuring Tiara Thomas – "Bad"

=== Best Live Performer ===
Jay Z

- 2 Chainz
- J. Cole
- Kendrick Lamar
- Kanye West

=== Lyricist of the Year ===
Kendrick Lamar

- J. Cole
- Drake
- Jay Z
- Wale

=== Video Director of the Year ===
Benny Boom

- A$AP Rocky & A$AP Ferg
- Director X
- Dre Films
- Hype Williams

=== DJ of the Year ===
DJ Drama

- DJ Envy
- DJ Funkmaster Flex
- DJ Khaled
- DJ Scream

=== Producer of the Year ===
Mike Will Made It

- J. Cole
- Hit-Boy
- DJ Mustard
- Pharrell Williams

=== MVP of the Year ===
Kendrick Lamar

- 2 Chainz
- J. Cole
- Drake
- Jay Z

=== Track of the Year ===
Only the producer of the track nominated in this category.

"Started From the Bottom" – Produced by Mike Zombie & Noah "40" Shebib (Drake)

- "Power Trip" – Produced by J. Cole (J. Cole featuring Miguel)
- "Problems" – Produced by Noah "40" Shebib (A$AP Rocky featuring Drake, 2 Chainz & Kendrick Lamar)
- "Don't Kill My Vibe" – Produced by Sounwave (Kendrick Lamar)
- "Bugatti" – Produced by Mike Will Made It (Ace Hood featuring Rick Ross & Future)

=== Album of the Year ===
Kendrick Lamar – good kid, m.A.A.d city

- J. Cole – Born Sinner
- Jay Z – Magna Carta Holy Grail
- Nas – Life Is Good
- Wale – The Gifted

=== Who New? Rookie of the Year ===
A$AP Ferg

- Action Bronson
- Earl Sweatshirt
- Joey Bada$$
- Trinidad Jame$

=== Hustler of the Year ===
Jay Z

- Diddy
- Kendrick Lamar
- T.I.
- Kanye West

=== Made-You-Look Award ===
A$AP Rocky (tie)
Nicki Minaj (tie)

- 2 Chainz
- Jay Z
- Kendrick Lamar
- Kanye West

=== Best Hip Hop Online Site ===
WorldStarHipHop.com

- Allhiphop.com
- Complex.com
- GlobalGrind.com
- RapRadar.com

=== Best Club Banger ===
French Montana featuring Rick Ross, Drake & Lil Wayne – "Pop That" (Produced by Lee on the Beats)

- Ace Hood featuring Rick Ross & Future – "Bugatti" (Produced by Mike Will Made It)
- A$AP Rocky featuring Drake, 2 Chainz & Kendrick Lamar – "Problems" (Produced by Noah "40" Shebib)
- Drake – "Started From the Bottom" (Produced by Mike Zombie & Noah "40" Shebib)
- Trinidad Jame$ – "All Gold Everything" (Produced by Devon Gallaspy)

=== Best Mixtape ===
Big Sean – Detroit

- Chance the Rapper – Acid Rap
- Travi$ Scott – Owl Pharaoh
- Stalley – Honest Cowboy
- Trinidad Jame$ – Don't Be S.A.F.E.

=== Sweet 16 (Best Featured Verse) ===
Kendrick Lamar – "Problems" (A$AP Rocky featuring Drake, 2 Chainz & Kendrick Lamar)

- Diddy – "Same Damn Time (Remix)" (Future featuring Diddy & Ludacris)
- Drake – "Versace (Remix)" (Migos featuring Drake)
- Future – "Bugatti" (Ace Hood featuring Rick Ross & Future)
- Wiz Khalifa – "U.O.E.N.O. (Remix)" (Rocko featuring Future & Wiz Khalifa)

=== Impact Track ===
J. Cole featuring TLC – Crooked Smile

- Jay Z featuring Justin Timberlake – Holy Grail
- Macklemore & Ryan Lewis featuring Mary Lambert – Same Love
- Wale featuring Sam Dew – LoveHate Thing
- Kanye West – BLKKK SKKKN HEAD

=== People's Champ Award ===
Drake – "Started From the Bottom"

- A$AP Rocky featuring Drake, 2 Chainz & Kendrick Lamar – "Problems"
- J. Cole featuring Miguel – "Power Trip"
- Kendrick Lamar – "Don't Kill My Vibe"
- Macklemore & Ryan Lewis featuring Ray Dalton – Can't Hold Us

=== I Am Hip Hop Award ===
MC Lyte
