= Lee on the Beats =

- Also known as: Lee Beats, Lee Of The Amazinz
- Born: Anthony Leedel Norris; February 11, 1990 (age 36)
- Origin: Queens, New York, United States
- Genre: Hip hop
- Occupations: Record producer, songwriter
- Instrument: FL Studio
- Years active: 2005-present
- Labels: Amazinz Music Group, We the Best Music Group

Anthony Leedel Norris (born February 11, 1990) is an American hip hop record producer and songwriter, professionally known as Lee on the Beats. Lee has produced for artists such as Lil Wayne, DJ Khaled, Kid Ink, Ace Hood, French Montana, Rick Ross, Meek Mill and Freeway, among others. In 2013, Lee was signed to DJ Khaled's We the Best Music Group. He is best known for producing French Montana’s “Pop That” and co-producing Khaled’s “Do You Mind”.

== Career ==
As a teenager Lee on the Beats started rapping and begun producing for local acts in Queens, New York. His family was more involved in the business and executive side of things. For example, His uncle, Skane Dolla was DJ Clue's manager as well as one of the owners of Desert Storm Records. He helped A&R projects for artists like Ludacris, Method Man, DMX, Fabolous, and Joe Budden for Def Jam. Lee was around for all of it, so he learned a lot growing up. Lee started a team called, The Amazinz with his cousin Roc Da Producer. From there they started looking for producers they could build the team. The current members are Roc, Dane, Jabarrie, Murrille, Mae N. Maejor, Robbin, and LDB.

Lee kn the Beats early major production credits included Kid Ink's "Is It You" and co-production on Freeway's "Superstar" featuring Meek Mill. In 2012, it only took Lee On the Beats three hours to create the beat for "Pop That", which he then gave to New York rapper Chinx Drugz, who then passed it on to French Montana. The 2 Live Crew sampling song, that would feature rappers Lil Wayne, Drake and Rick Ross, became the lead single from Montana's debut studio album Excuse My French. The song would end up peaking at number 36 on the Billboard Hot 100, and would be shortly certified Platinum by the RIAA.

In March 2013, DJ Khaled announced that he had signed Lee On the Beats, to his record label We the Best Music Group. Following his signing, he produced two song's on Ace Hood's fourth studio album Trials & Tribulations including the single "We Outchea". In July 2013, Lee On the Beats was named one of the "top ten young producers on the rise", by BET. On August 2, 2013, DJ Khaled released "I Wanna Be With You", the second single from his album Suffering from Success, which was produced by Lee On the Beats and featured Rick Ross, Future and Nicki Minaj. He also co-produced two more songs on the album, "You Don't Want These Problems" and "I'm Still". In October 2013, Lee revealed that he would release an instrumental project in 2014. The instrumental mixtape titled Catch the Vibe was released on February 11, 2014.

== Production style ==
Lee on the Beats has said that his production style is influenced by IC3T3K 2K, Pharrell Williams, Ryan Leslie, and Swiss Beatz.

== Production discography ==
=== Singles produced ===
Year	Title	Chart positions			Album
Year	Title	US	US R&B/HH	US Rap	Album
2012	"Pop That" (French Montana featuring Drake, Lil Wayne and Rick Ross)	36	2	2	Excuse My French
2013	"We Outchea" (Ace Hood featuring Lil Wayne)	119	49	—	Trials & Tribulations
2013	"I Wanna Be with You" (DJ Khaled featuring Nicki Minaj, Future and Rick Ross)	101	30	22	Suffering from Success
2014	"My Bae" (Vado (rapper) featuring Jeremih)	—	—	—	TBA
2014	"Hold You Down" (DJ Khaled featuring Chris Brown, Future, August Alsina and Jeremih)	39	10	—	I Changed a Lot
2015	"How Many Times" (DJ Khaled featuring Chris Brown, Lil Wayne and Big Sean)	68	17	—	I Changed a Lot
2015	"Gold Slugs" (DJ Khaled featuring Chris Brown, August Alsina and Fetty Wap)	119	49	—	I Changed a Lot
2015	"You Mine" (DJ Khaled featuring Trey Songz, Future and Jeremih)	—	—	—	I Changed a Lot
2015	"On Your Body" (Chinx featuring MeetSims)	—	—	—	Welcome to JFK
2016	"Bring Me Some" (Moosh and Twist)	—	—	—	Growing Pains
2016	"Do You Mind" (DJ Khaled featuring Nicki Minaj, Chris Brown, Jeremih, August Alsina, Future (rapper), & Rick Ross)	27	9	—	Major Key (album)

=== Other credits ===
List of produced non-singles as producer or co-producer, with performing artists, showing year released and album name
Year	Title	Album
2013	"It's Going Down" (Ace Hood featuring Meek Mill)	Starvation 2
2013	"Hope" (Ace Hood)	Trials & Tribulations
2013	"You Don't Want These Problems" (DJ Khaled featuring Big Sean, Rick Ross, French Montana, 2 Chainz, Meek Mill, Ace Hood and Timbaland) (Produced with Timbaland, DJ Khaled, DJ Nasty & LVM)	Suffering from Success
2013	"I'm Still" (DJ Khaled featuring Chris Brown, Ace Hood, Wiz Khalifa and Wale (Produced with Bkorn, DJ Khaled)	Suffering from Success
2013	"Shake It" (Funkmaster Flex featuring Busta Rhymes, Trey Songz and Future)	Who You Mad At? Me Or Yourself?
2013	"LeBron James" (Yo Gotti featuring Meek Mill)	I Am
2013	"Frontline" (SBOE feat. Lil Durk)	All We Got Is Us
2013	"Camos N J's" (Young Savage)	Camos & Jordans
2013	"OJ Mayo" (Young Savage featuring Young Chris and Gillie Da Kid)	Camos & Jordans
2013	"Stay" (Young Savage featuring ToneTheVoice)	Camos & Jordans
2014	"Hatin' For" (Nikko Lafre featuring Drew Love and Devon Tracy)	Survival: Face The World
2014	"Moment" (Lil Wayne)	Young Money: Rise of an Empire
2014	"Cash Up" (Batgang featuring Kid Ink, Jeremih, and Gorilla Zoe)	4B's
2015	"Thug Love" (Chinx featuring Jeremih) (Produced with K-Beatz)	Welcome to JFK
2015	"Don't Mind Me" (Chinx featuring MeetSims) (Produced with Bkorn)	Welcome to JFK
2015	"What U Want" (PnB Rock) (Produced with Bkorn)	RNB 3
2015	"Y.L.M.L." (Alus)	—
2015	"Cash Rules" (DJ Spinking featuring Chinx, and Zack)	The Connect
2016	"Meant To Be" (Chrisette Michele) (Produced with Austin Powerz & RocDaProducer)	Milestone
2016	"To The Moon" (Chrisette Michele)	Milestone
2016	"Count It Up" (Tink (musician)) (Produced with Jahlil Beats)	—
2016	"Things Like That" (PNB Rock & Fetty Wap) (Produced with Austin Powerz)	Money, Hoes & Flows
2016	"Do You Mind" (DJ Khaled featuring Nicki Minaj, Chris Brown, Jeremih, August Alsina, Future (rapper), & Rick Ross) (Produced with DJ Khaled & NASTY BEATMAKERZ)	Major Key
2017	"Droptop in the Rain" (Ty Dolla Sign featuring Tory Lanez) (Produced with Hitmaka)	Beach House 3
