= Bkorn =

American record producer (born 1991)

- Also known as: Bkorn
- Born: Brandon Chase Korn; March 15, 1991 (age 35)
- Origin: Woodcliff Lake, New Jersey, U.S.
- Genres: Hip hop; R&B
- Occupations: Record producer; songwriter
- Instruments: Logic Pro; guitar; bass; drums; piano
- Years active: 2009–present
- Label: Sony ATV

Brandon Chase Korn (born March 15, 1991), professionally known as Bkorn, is an American record producer. Bkorn is best known for producing for Travis Scott, DJ Khaled, Nav, PnB Rock, Chris Brown, Lil' Kim, Chinx, Lil Wayne, and more. In August 2015, Bkorn signed a publishing deal with Sony/ATV Music Publishing.

== Early life ==
Raised in Woodcliff Lake, New Jersey, Bkorn graduated from Pascack Hills High School in 2009.

In 2009, Bkorn started to produce primarily hip hop and R&B music using the Apple software application GarageBand typically producing electronic dance music and cover versions of other popular songs. From there, he became more serious about a career in music production. In 2011, Bkorn graduated from University of Hartford with an Associate's degree in Contemporary Arts, and in 2014 he graduated from Ramapo College with a Bachelor's degree in Music Production.

== Career ==
=== Career beginnings ===
Bkorn continued producing throughout his college career, using Logic Pro to make beats. In 2012, Bkorn interned at Puff Daddy's studio, Daddy's House Recording Studio. In 2013, Bkorn landed his first placement on DJ Khaled's 7th studio album Suffering from Success. The song was "I'm Still".

=== Present ===
Since then, Bkorn has co-produced DJ Khaled's 2014 RIAA Gold certified Hold You Down and the 2015 single "How Many Times"; as well as late rapper Chinx's first album single "On Your Body". In August 2015, Bkorn signed a publishing deal with Sony/ATV Music Publishing. Bkorn has also stated that he is interested in exploring pop and dance-pop music genres as well. More recently he worked on song Stargazing in the critically acclaimed album Astroworld by Travis Scott

== Production discography ==
=== Singles produced ===
Year	Title	Chart positions			Album
Year	Title	US	US R&B/HH	US Rap	Album
2013	"I'm Still" (DJ Khaled featuring Chris Brown, Wale, Wiz Khalifa and Ace Hood)	—	54	—	Suffering from Success
2014	"Hold You Down" (DJ Khaled featuring Chris Brown, Future, August Alsina and Jeremih)	39	10	—	I Changed a Lot
2015	"How Many Times" (DJ Khaled featuring Chris Brown, Lil Wayne and Big Sean)	68	17	13	I Changed a Lot
2015	"On Your Body" (Chinx featuring MeetSims)	—	—	—	Welcome to JFK
2016	"Stamina" (Moosh and Twist featuring Lil Uzi Vert)	—	—	—	Growing Pains
2017	"Took Us a Break" (Lil Kim)	—	—	—	
2018	"STARGAZING" (Travis Scott)	10	17	10	ASTROWORLD
2019	"Control" (Vory)	—	—	—	Lucky Me
2019	"Nasty One" (Lil Kim)	-	-	-	-/-
2019	"M.I.A." (Mitch)	-	-	-	Girl Power
2019	"Deez Streets" (PNB Rock)	-	-	-	TrapStar Turnt PopStar
2020	"Spend It" (Nav featuring Young Thug)	-	-	-	Good Intentions

=== 2014 ===
DJ Khaled - I Changed a Lot

- 14 Hold You Down Remix featuring Usher, Rick Ross, Fabolous and Ace Hood

Zack

- Shots Going Off (featuring Chinx)

Chinx - Cocaine Riot 4

- 12 Thank You (featuring French Montana and Bynoe)

=== 2015 ===
Chinx - Cocaine Riot 5

- 12 Point Blank (featuring Zack)

Chinx - Welcome to JFK

- 09 Don't Mind Me (featuring MeetSims)

Chinx

- On Your Body (Remix) featuring Rick Ross & Meet Sims

Omelly - On My Time Vol. 1

- 04 We Did That (featuring Meek Mill)

PnB Rock - RNB 3

- 02 What U Want
