= Legends Never Die =

Legends Never Die may refer to:

- Legends Never Die (Chinx album), 2016
- Legends Never Die, a 2007 album by The Dreadnoughts
- Legends Never Die (Juice Wrld album), 2020
- Legends Never Die (R.A. the Rugged Man album), 2013
- "Legends Never Die" (Against the Current song), a song for the 2017 League of Legends World Championship
- "Legends Never Die", a song by Wendy O. Williams from the album WOW, 1984
- "Legends Never Die", a song by Ferras and Katy Perry from the EP Ferras, 2014
- "Legends Never Die", a song by Orville Peck and Shania Twain from the EP Show Pony, 2020
- "Legends Never Die", a single by Bad Wolves from Die About It, 2023

== See also ==
- "Heroes Get Remembered, Legends Never Die", a song by Four Year Strong on the 2007 album Rise or Die Trying
