= Poor Decisions =

Single by Wale featuring Rick Ross & Lupe Fiasco

from the album Self Made Vol. 3
- Released: July 2, 2013
- Recorded: 2013
- Genre: Hip hop
- Length: 5:06
- Label: Allido; Maybach; Atlantic
- Songwriters: Olubowale Akintimehin; Wasalu Jaco; William Leonard Roberts II
- Producers: Jake One; Swish (co.)

Wale singles chronology
"Bounce It" (2013)	"Poor Decisions" (2013)	"Clappers" (2013)

Rick Ross singles chronology
"No New Friends" (2013)	"Poor Decisions" (2013)	"I Wanna Be with You" (2013)

Lupe Fiasco singles chronology
"Battle Scars" (2012)	"Poor Decisions" (2013)	"Old School Love" (2013)

"Poor Decisions" is a song by American rapper Wale featuring fellow American rappers Rick Ross and Lupe Fiasco, released as the lead single from the Maybach Music Group (owned by Ross) compilation album, Self Made Vol. 3. The song peaked on the US Billboard Bubbling Under R&B/Hip-Hop Singles at number nine.

== Background ==
On June 3, 2013, "Poor Decisions" was officially premiered by Vibe. It was originally thought to be a track from Wale's third studio album The Gifted. On June 4, 2013, Rick Ross revealed the first two songs from Self Made Vol. 3, "God Is Great" by Rockie Fresh, and "Poor Decisions" by Wale featuring Ross and Lupe Fiasco. On July 2, 2013 "Poor Decisions" along with, "Levels" by Meek Mill would be sent to iTunes as the album's first and second singles.

Coincidentally all three artists had recently gone through controversy around the release of the song. From Rick Ross rhyming about date rape on "U.O.E.N.O.", to Wale who recently got into an argument with a basketball announcer who chose to insult the D.C.-based rapper and Fiasco who had gotten in trouble for publicly criticizing Barack Obama during an inauguration party. However, the song does not mention any of the issues, and is based around "positive vibes". The song's verses were described as "introspective" by Rap-Up.

== Music video ==
On June 5, 2013, The DRE Films directed music video for "Poor Decisions" was released, along with the "God Is Great" and "Oil Money Gang" music videos.

== Critical reception ==
Bruce Smith of HipHopDX praised Lupe Fiasco's verse on "Poor Decisions" as the biggest highlight of Self Made 3 and that it should be in the running for one of the best verses of 2013. Jesse Cataldo of Slant Magazine called the song, a "somber huddle that emerges as Wale takes on one of his signature social messages, which Ross mostly uses as an excuse to shame those less successful at imaginary crime than him.

== Chart performance ==
Chart (2013)	Peak position
US Bubbling Under R&B/Hip-Hop Singles (Billboard)	9
