= How Many Times (DJ Khaled song) =

Single by DJ Khaled featuring Chris Brown, Lil Wayne and Big Sean

from the album I Changed a Lot
- Released: May 12, 2015
- Recorded: 2015
- Genre: Hip hop; electro-R&B
- Length: 4:23
- Label: We the Best; RED; Sony
- Songwriters: Khaled Khaled; Brandon Korn; Christopher Brown; Dwayne Carter; Sean Anderson; Anthony Norris; Ozan Yildirim
- Producers: DJ Khaled; Bkorn; Lee on the Beats; OZ

DJ Khaled singles chronology
"Don't Shoot" (2014)	"How Many Times" (2015)	"Gold Slugs" (2015)

Big Sean singles chronology
"B Boy" (2015)	"How Many Times" (2015)	"One Man Can Change the World" (2015)

Chris Brown singles chronology
"Do It Again" (2015)	"How Many Times" (2015)	"All Eyes on You" (2015)

Lil Wayne singles chronology
"Truffle Butter" (2015)	"How Many Times" (2015)	"Just Right for Me" (2015)

Music video
- "How Many Times" Video on YouTube

"How Many Times" is the third single from DJ Khaled's eighth studio album I Changed a Lot (2015). It features Chris Brown, Lil Wayne and Big Sean, and was released on May 12, 2015.

The song, produced by Lee on the Beats, Bkorn, and Khaled himself, peaked at number 68 on the Billboard Hot 100. It was the first single by Khaled released under RED Distribution/Sony and his own label We the Best Music, after parting ways with Cash Money and Republic Records. The song was panned by critics, many of whom deemed it misogynistic.

== Music video ==
A music video for the song was released on May 11, 2015. This video was famously known for featuring Khaled saying "Another one!" when demanding another kiss from a woman in the video. Ace Hood makes a cameo. This quote would then quickly evolve into a meme and has since then been featured in many of Khaled's later singles, most notably "For Free", which features Canadian rapper Drake, and in "Do You Mind", which features Nicki Minaj, Chris Brown, August Alsina, Jeremih, Future, and Rick Ross.

== Charts ==
Chart (2015)	Peak position
Belgium Urban (Ultratop Flanders)	40
France (SNEP)	120
US Billboard Hot 100	68
US Hot R&B/Hip-Hop Songs (Billboard)	17
US R&B/Hip-Hop Airplay (Billboard)	10
US Rhythmic Airplay (Billboard)	23

== Certifications ==
Region	Certification	Certified units/sales
United States (RIAA)	Gold	500,000^{‡}
^{‡} Sales+streaming figures based on certification alone.
