= I Changed a Lot =

Studio album by DJ Khaled
- Released: October 23, 2015
- Recorded: 2014–2015
- Genres: Hip-hop; R&B
- Length: 51:08
- Labels: We the Best; RED
- Producers: DJ Khaled (also exec.); Bkorn; Danja; Evan Powell; LDB; Lee on the Beats; Mike Zombie; NBA 2K16; OZ; Reazy Renegade; Scott Storch; StreetRunner; Tarik Azzouz; The Beat Bully; The Exclusives; The Mekanics; The Youngstars

DJ Khaled chronology
| Suffering from Success (2013) | I Changed a Lot (2015) | Major Key (2016) |

Deluxe edition cover

Singles from I Changed a Lot
- 1. "They Don't Love You No More" Released: April 29, 2014; 2. "Hold You Down" Released: August 3, 2014; 3. "How Many Times" Released: May 12, 2015; 4. "Gold Slugs" Released: October 12, 2015

I Changed a Lot is the eighth studio album by American disc jockey and record producer DJ Khaled. It was released on October 23, 2015, by We the Best Music Group and RED Music. Recording sessions took place during 2014 to 2015, with its production by DJ Khaled, along with The Beat Bully, Lee on the Beats, Danja, Bkorn and The Mekanics, as well as guest appearances from Future, Rick Ross, Boosie Badazz, Jeezy, Chris Brown, August Alsina, Fetty Wap, Yo Gotti, Trick Daddy, French Montana, Meek Mill, Beanie Sigel, Jadakiss, Lil Wayne, Big Sean, Trey Songz, Jeremih, Ace Hood, Vado, Jay-Z, Mavado, John Legend, Usher and Fabolous.

I Changed a Lot was supported by four official singles: "They Don't Love You No More", featuring Jay-Z, Meek Mill, Rick Ross and French Montana, "Hold You Down", featuring Chris Brown, August Alsina, Future and Jeremih, "How Many Times", featuring Brown, Lil Wayne and Big Sean and "Gold Slugs", featuring Brown, Alsina and Fetty Wap.

== Singles ==
The lead single, titled "They Don't Love You No More", featuring Jay-Z, Meek Mill, Rick Ross and French Montana, was officially released on April 29, 2014. It was produced by Mike Zombie and co-produced by DJ Khaled. The music video for "They Don't Love You No More", featuring Jay-Z, Meek Mill, Rick Ross and French Montana (directed by Gil Green and Khaled), premiered on June 22, 2014.

The second single, titled "Hold You Down", featuring Chris Brown, August Alsina, Future and Jeremih, was released on August 10, 2014. It was produced by Lee on the Beats, Bkorn and LDB, and co-produced by Khaled. The music video for "Hold You Down", featuring Chris Brown, August Alsina, Future and Jeremih (directed by Gil Green), premiered on August 11, 2014.

The music video for "How Many Times", featuring Chris Brown, Lil Wayne and Big Sean. The song was produced by OZ, Bkorn and Lee on the Beats, and co-produced by Khaled. It was released on May 11, 2015. The song was officially released on May 12, 2015, as the album's third single.

The album's fourth single, "Gold Slugs", featuring Chris Brown, August Alsina and Fetty Wap, was released on October 12, 2015. It was produced by Lee on the Beats. The music video for "Gold Slugs", featuring Chris Brown, August Alsina and Fetty Wap, was also released on October 12, 2015.

== Critical reception ==
Professional ratings
Aggregate scores
| Source | Rating |
|---|---|
| Metacritic | 63/100 |
Review scores
| Source | Rating |
| AllMusic | 3/5 stars |
| HipHopDX | 2/5 stars |
| Spin | 6/10 |
| The New York Times | 7/10 |

I Changed a Lot was met with generally positive reviews from music critics. Marcus Dowling of HipHopDX said, "I Changed A Lot lacks a “We Taking Over”-style smash single to show for the incredible hit-making power of the performers present. Something just feels off in Khaled's traditional manner of creating ubiquitous pop cultural touchstones. This album is generally solid, but in lacking the groundbreaking moment we’ve come to expect from the artist/producer/chicken wing restaurateur known for being “the best,” it falls short."

== Commercial performance ==
The album debuted at number 12 on the Billboard 200, with 25,000 equivalent album units in the United States, with 19,000 copies sold in its first week.

== Track listing ==
I Changed a Lot – CD – digital download – streaming
| No. | Title | Writer(s) | Producer(s) | Length |
|---|---|---|---|---|
| 1. | "I Don't Play About My Paper" (featuring Future and Rick Ross) | Khaled Khaled; Nayvadius Wilburn; William Roberts II; Anthony Tucker; Andre Lyon; Kevin Cossom | The Beat Bully | 3:15 |
| 2. | "I Ride" (featuring Boosie Badazz, Future, Rick Ross and Jeezy) | Lyon; Wilburn; Roberts II; Torrence Hatch; Jay Jenkins; Bryan Johnson | Reazy Renegade | 3:37 |
| 3. | "Gold Slugs" (featuring Chris Brown, August Alsina and Fetty Wap) | Lyon; Willie Maxwell II; Anthony Morris; Sean McMillion; Ralph Jeanty | Lee on the Beats; The Exclusives | 4:22 |
| 4. | "I Swear I Never Tell Another Soul" (featuring Future, Yo Gotti and Trick Daddy) | Khaled; Wilburn; Mario Mims; Maurice Young; Nate Hills | Danja; DJ Khaled^{[a]} | 3:42 |
| 5. | "I Lied" (featuring French Montana, Meek Mill, Beanie Sigel and Jadakiss) | Khaled; Robert Williams; Karim Kharbouch; Dwight Grant; Jason Phillips; Nicholas Warwar; Tarik Azzouz; Lyon | Streetrunner; Azzouz; The Youngstars; DJ Khaled^{[a]} | 4:40 |
| 6. | "How Many Times" (featuring Chris Brown, Lil Wayne and Big Sean) | Khaled; Brown; Dwayne Carter, Jr.; Sean Anderson; Brandon Korn; Morris; Ozan Yildirim | OZ; Bkorn; Lee on the Beats; DJ Khaled^{[a]} | 4:23 |
| 7. | "You Mine" (featuring Trey Songz, Jeremih and Future) | Khaled; Cossom; Tremaine Neverson; Lyon; Felton; Wilburn; Morris | Lee on the Beats | 4:00 |
| 8. | "Every Time We Come Around" (featuring French Montana, Jadakiss, Ace Hood and Vado) | Khaled; Kharbouch; Antoine McColister; Teeyon Winfree; Rico Evans; Michael Hernandez; Richard Duran; Scott Storch | The Mekanics; Storch | 3:35 |
| 9. | "I Ain't Worried" (featuring Ace Hood and Rick Ross) | Khaled; McColister; Roberts II; Tucker | The Beat Bully | 3:16 |
| 10. | "They Don't Love You No More" (featuring Jay-Z, Meek Mill, Rick Ross and French Montana) | Khaled; Shawn Carter; Roberts II; Kharbouch; Williams; William Coleman | Mike Zombie; DJ Khaled^{[a]} | 4:11 |
| 11. | "My League" (performed by Mavado) | Khaled; David Brooks; Evan Powell | Powell | 3:39 |
| 12. | "Hold You Down" (featuring Chris Brown, August Alsina, Future and Jeremih) | Khaled; Felton; Wilburn; Korn; Morris; Lyon; Sayyi McDonald | Lee on the Beats; Bkorn; LDB; DJ Khaled^{[a]} | 4:53 |
| 13. | "Most High" (featuring John Legend) | Khaled; Cossom; John Stephens; Azzouz; Warwar | Streetrunner; Azzouz; DJ Khaled^{[a]} | 1:36 |
| Total length: | | | | 51:08 |

I Changed a Lot – Deluxe edition (bonus tracks)
| No. | Title | Writer(s) | Producer(s) | Length |
|---|---|---|---|---|
| 14. | "Hold You Down (Remix)" (featuring Usher, Rick Ross, Fabolous and Ace Hood) | Khaled; Usher Raymond IV; Roberts II; John Jackson; McColister; Morris; Korn | Lee on the Beats; Bkorn; LDB; DJ Khaled^{[a]} | 4:29 |
| 15. | "365" (featuring Kent Jones, Ace Hood and Vado) | Khaled; Kent Jones; McColister; Winfree | Lee on the Beats; Bkorn; LDB; NBA 2K16; DJ Khaled^{[a]} | 5:04 |
| 16. | "Gold Slugs (Instrumental)" | Khaled; Kharbouch; Smith; Thomaz; Carter | Lee on the Beats; DJ Khaled | 4:11 |
| 17. | "I Lied (Instrumental)" | Khaled; Graham; Maxwell II; Lamar; Carter | The Youngstars | 4:36 |
| Total length: | | | | 64:31 |

Notes

- ^{^a} signifies a co-producer.

== Charts ==
=== Weekly charts ===
Weekly chart performance
| Chart (2015) | Peak position |
|---|---|
| Belgian Albums (Ultratop Flanders) | 178 |
| Canadian Albums (Billboard) | 98 |
| UK Album Downloads (Official Charts) | 52 |
| UK R&B Albums (Official Charts) | 14 |
| US Billboard 200 | 12 |
| US Independent Albums (Billboard) | 1 |
| US Top R&B/Hip-Hop Albums (Billboard) | 2 |

=== Year-end charts ===
Year-end chart performance
| Chart (2015) | Position |
|---|---|
| US Top R&B/Hip-Hop Albums (Billboard) | 97 |
