= They Don't Love You No More =

Single by DJ Khaled featuring Rick Ross, Jay-Z, Meek Mill and French Montana

from the album I Changed a Lot
- Released: April 29, 2014
- Recorded: 2014
- Genre: Hip-hop
- Length: 4:11
- Label: We the Best; Terror Squad; Young Money; Cash Money; Republic
- Songwriters: Shawn Carter; William Michael Coleman; Khaled Khaled; Karim Kharbouch; Rick Ross; Robert Rihmeek Williams
- Producer: Mike Zombie DJ Khaled

DJ Khaled singles chronology
"I Wanna Be with You" (2013)	"They Don't Love You No More" (2014)	"Hold You Down" (2014)

Jay-Z singles chronology
"Part II (On the Run)" (2014)	"They Don't Love You No More" (2014)	"Seen It All" (2014)

Meek Mill singles chronology
"Levels" (2013)	"They Don't Love You No More" (2014)	"B Boy" (2015)

Rick Ross singles chronology
"Thug Cry" (2014)	"They Don't Love You No More" (2014)	"Options" (2014)

French Montana singles chronology
"I Luh Ya Papi" (2014)	"They Don't Love You No More" (2014)	"Don't Panic" (2014)

"They Don't Love You No More" is a song by the American record producer DJ Khaled, released as the first single from his eighth album I Changed a Lot. The song features guest appearances from American rappers Rick Ross, Jay-Z, Meek Mill and French Montana. The hip hop song's production was handled by OVO Sound's Mike Zombie.

== Background ==
On April 28, 2014, DJ Khaled announced in an interview with MTV that Jay-Z will be featured on his new single. The interview was noted due to Khaled "cursing, gesturing, and tossing the microphone to the floor in an effort to convey the importance and impact of the music he has coming this summer." Few hours after that, he released the single called "They Don't Love You No More", also featuring frequent collaborators Rick Ross, Meek Mill and French Montana. A remix was released featuring Remy Ma and French Montana on the hook still.

== Release ==
On April 29, 2014, "They Don't Love You No More" was serviced to mainstream urban radio in the United States. It was then serviced to rhythmic contemporary radio in the US on May 20, 2014.

== Music video ==
The music video for "They Don't Love You No More" was released on June 22, 2014. It was filmed in several locations in Miami and directed by Gil Green and DJ Khaled. It also featured cameo appearances from Timbaland, Ace Hood, Lil TerRio, Mike Zombie and others. Jay-Z does not physically appear in the video, but his verse still does. Khaled addressed this saying, "You know, Jay-Z really don't shoot that many videos. He aint never say yes and he aint never say no. But if you notice the records he do get on, he don't shoot that many videos. He don't really shoot that many videos for himself. I was grateful to have the verse and the opportunity to work with somebody I'm inspired by and look up to. Just to get him on the record was a major key"

== Controversy ==
DJ Khaled was delivered a cease and desist letter over the single's cover art shortly after its release by Bigg Bank Entertainment. An independent rapper Kolley released a mixtape, RNS several weeks before DJ Khaled released "They Don't Love You No More". The cover for his mixtape features Kolley biting a gold chain with gold teeth, while Khaled's features him doing the same.

== Charts ==
Chart (2014)	Peak position
Germany (Deutsche Black Charts)	23
US Bubbling Under Hot 100 (Billboard)	5
US Hot R&B/Hip-Hop Songs (Billboard)	30
