= Don't Panic (French Montana song) =

Single by French Montana
- Released: August 12, 2014
- Recorded: 2012–2013
- Genre: Hip hop
- Length: 3:27
- Label: Coke Boys, Bad Boy, Maybach Music Group, Interscope
- Songwriters: Karim Karbouch, Dijon McFarlane, Mikely Adam
- Producer: DJ Mustard

French Montana singles chronology
| "They Don't Love You No More" (2014) | "Don't Panic" (2014) | "Early In The Morning" (2014) |

Music video
- "Don't Panic" on YouTube

"Don't Panic" is a song by American hip hop recording artist French Montana. It was released on August 12, 2014, as a standalone single. The song was produced by DJ Mustard.

== Background ==
The song was teased for months on social media and featured a different cover art prior to its official release in August. Then girlfriend Khloé Kardashian is featured on the right side of the official cover art. The song makes a few allusions to the novel The Hitchhiker's Guide to the Galaxy, namely the phrase "Don't Panic", repeated throughout the song, and star and planet imagery in the first verse.

== Music video ==
A music video for the song directed by Eif Rivera was shot on July 9, 2014. It was released on August 13, 2014. The video features Montana's now ex-girlfriend Khloé Kardashian.

== Remixes ==
The official remix features R&B singers Jeremih and Chris Brown. Fellow Coke Boy member Chinx released his own remix to the song. Compton rapper YG made a remix of his own.

== Track listing ==
Digital download

| No. | Title | Producer(s) | Length |
|---|---|---|---|
| 1. | "Don't Panic" | DJ Mustard | 3:27 |

== Charts ==
| Chart (2014–15) | Peak position |
|---|---|
| US Hot R&B/Hip-Hop Songs (Billboard) | 37 |
