= Self Made Vol. 3 =

Compilation album by Maybach Music Group
- Released: September 17, 2013
- Recorded: 2012–13
- Genre: Hip hop
- Length: 70:28
- Labels: Maybach; Def Jam; Atlantic; WMGreen
- Producers: Rick Ross (exec.); Aone Beats; Boi-1da; Brian Nunez; Beat Billionaire; Cardo; DJ Spinz; The Co-Captains; Childish Major; D Rich; Hit-Boy; Soundtrakk; Jake One; Kebu; Lil Lee; The Maven Boys; The Mekanics; OhZee; Rock City; Schife; SK; Swish; Tone P

Maybach Music Group chronology
Self Made Vol. 2 (2012)	Self Made Vol. 3 (2013)

Singles from Self Made Vol. 3
- 1. "Poor Decisions" Released: July 2, 2013; 2. "Levels" Released: July 2, 2013; 3. "God Is Great" Released: July 16, 2013; 4. "Know You Better" Released: August 20, 2013

Self Made Vol. 3 is the third compilation album by MMG. The album was released on September 17, 2013, by Maybach Music Group, Atlantic Records, and Def Jam Recordings. Like the two previous albums in the Self Made series, the album features contributions from members signed to the MMG label including Rick Ross, Meek Mill, Wale, Stalley, French Montana, Omarion and Rockie Fresh along with Gunplay, Young Breed and Torch of Triple C's. The album features additional guest appearances from Yo Gotti, Lil Boosie, Birdman, J. Cole, Fabolous, Pusha T, Hit-Boy, and Lupe Fiasco among others.

Self Made Vol. 3 was supported by four singles — "Poor Decisions" by Wale and Rick Ross, "Levels" by Meek Mill, "God Is Great" by Rockie Fresh and "Know You Better" by Omarion. Upon its release, the album was met with generally positive reviews from music critics. It also debuted at number four on the US Billboard 200 chart, with first-week sales of 50,000 copies.

== Background ==
On June 4, 2013, Rick Ross announced that Maybach Music Group would be releasing their third studio album Self Made Vol. 3 on August 6, 2013, and also released the album cover. On June 4, 2013, during an interview with MTV News, Rick Ross spoke about the album, saying "A lot of times you'll get in the studio with your homey and collaborate on a record that may not necessarily fit with the body of work… you may be putting together for a solo album, but it's something that you really want to give to your fans. It's something it's really super dope, but it's only a way you can present it — in a form like this…" In July 2013, Amazon.com revealed that the release date of the album would be pushed back from August 6, 2013, to September 17, 2013. On August 25, 2013, the final track listing was released revealing guest appearances on the album from Yo Gotti, Lil Boosie, Birdman, J. Cole, Fabolous, Pusha T, Hit-Boy, French Montana, Lupe Fiasco, and Dream Chasers Records artists, Omelly, Louie V Gutta, and Lil Snupe, among others.

== Singles ==
On June 4, 2013, Ross released the first two songs from the album "God Is Great" by Rockie Fresh, and "Poor Decisions" by Rick Ross and Wale featuring Lupe Fiasco. The following day, music videos were released for the two tracks. On July 2, 2013 "Poor Decisions", and "Levels" by Meek Mill would be sent to iTunes as the album's first and second singles. Then on July 16, 2013, "God Is Great" would be released as the third single. On August 13, 2013, the music video was released for "Levels" by Meek Mill. On August 20, 2013, the fourth single "Know You Better" by Omarion featuring Fabolous and Pusha T was released. On September 15, 2013, the music videos for "Gallardo" by Gunplay featuring Rick Ross and Yo Gotti along with, the music video for "Know You Better" by Omarion featuring Pusha T and Fabolous were premiered on MTV Jams. On November 5, 2013, the music video was released for "Stack on My Belt" by Rick Ross featuring Wale, Whole Slab and Birdman. On January 26, 2014, the music video was released for "Black Grammys" by Wale featuring Meek Mill, Rockie Fresh and J. Cole. On March 9, 2014, the music video was released for "What Ya Used To" by Rockie Fresh featuring Hit-Boy.

== Critical response ==
Professional ratings
Aggregate scores
Source	Rating
Metacritic	63/100
Review scores
Source	Rating
AllMusic	3.5/5 stars
Consequence of Sound	3/5 stars
Exclaim!	7/10
HipHopDX	3/5 stars
Slant Magazine	2.5/5 stars
XXL	(L)

Self Made Vol. 3 was met with generally favorable reviews from music critics. At Metacritic, which assigns a normalized rating out of 100 to reviews from mainstream critics, the album received an average score of 63, based on 6 reviews. David Jeffries of AllMusic gave the album three and a half stars out of five, saying "Three volumes in and Rick Ross' Maybach Music Presents series Self Made officially becomes an annual concern with this 2013 edition featuring one of the biggest label roster lineups to date, including Ross, Meek Mill, Wale, Omarion, and secret weapon Stalley. That last name shines on the key cut "Coupes & Roses," which sinks into the couch with '70s R&B and plush production from Kebu and Childish Major, but the rest of the bangers are unsurprisingly superstar, including the uplifting "Black Grammys" from Wale, Mill, Rockie Fresh, and special guest J. Cole." Dharmic X of XXL gave the album an L, saying "Self Made Vol. 3 won't silence the haters of Rick Ross' MMG movement, and it certainly does not break the mold of previous iterations in the series. However, the album's hits should have a lasting impact, serving as jump off points for several of the artists on the label. Rozay can't ask for much more than that." Jesse Cataldo of Slant Magazine gave the album two and a half stars out of five, saying "For a while, it seems like the album will only provide condensed versions of familiar tics: Mill spitting out breathless, frenzied verses; Wale getting unnecessarily technical; Ross offering his signature—and always entertaining—beefy grunts and armchair declarations of bawse-hood. But there are a few nice surprises on the album's back half. "Know You Better" has a twisted piano line that outshines Omarion's underwhelming performance, and "Coupes and Roses" is a genuine coup for label stalwart Stalley, a slinky, totally unexpected bit of jazz-rap that finds him deftly stepping around cooing sax lines."

Bruce Smith of HipHopDX gave the album three out of five stars, saying "Self Made 3 is a good introduction for young Rockie Fresh. But for those who were listening to the project for Meek Mill, Wale, or Ross, may be disappointed. Rarely on the project do any of the other MMG members shine. Overall, the album lacks the shine and luster of the previous two Maybach Music Group compilations." Mike Madden of Consequence of Sound gave the album three out of five stars, saying "If any street rap entity has the power to push these sounds past their usual boundaries, it's MMG and their producers (a few of the bigger names behind the boards here: Boi-1da, Cardo, Hit-Boy, and even Jake One). They don't do much innovating here, though there are singular moments. Other than that, Self Made Vol. 3 will please no one all the way through, but could present just about anyone with a few new favorites." Chayne Japal of Exclaim! gave the album a seven out of ten, saying "While the label's moves have always felt strategic, Self Made 3 suggests that the main plan has pure, simple intentions: develop talented artists and release good music."

=== Accolades ===
The album was ranked at number 20 on Rolling Stone's list of the 20 best hip hop albums of 2013. They commented saying, "MMG rolls deep, but Self Made Vol. 3 gets its best output from its bench players: Rockie Fresh resurrects that shiny-suit Ma$e vibe on "What Ya Used To," Stalley and Omarion both turn in solid work and Gunplay ties lyrical knots with Boy Scout precision."

== Commercial performance ==
The album debuted at number four on the US Billboard 200 chart, with first-week sales of 50,000 copies in the United States, the lowest first week sales of the three Self Made volumes. In its second week the album sold 16,000 more copies. In its third week the album sold 8,000 more copies bringing its total album sales to 74,000.

== Track listing ==
No.	Title	Producer(s)	Length
1.	"Lil Snupe Intro" (Lil Snupe)	Lil Lee	2:27
2.	"Gallardo" (Gunplay featuring Rick Ross & Yo Gotti)	Aone Beats	5:37
3.	"The Plug" (Meek Mill featuring Omelly & Young Breed)	D. Rich	4:02
4.	"Levels" (Meek Mill)	Cardo	4:00
5.	"Lay It Down" (Rick Ross featuring Young Breed & Lil Boosie)	Schife; DJ OhZee; Brian Nunez	3:33
6.	"Stack on My Belt" (Rick Ross featuring Wale, Whole Slab & Birdman)	Beat Billionaire	4:52
7.	"Black Grammys" (Wale featuring Rockie Fresh, Meek Mill & J. Cole)	Tone P	5:42
8.	"Coupes & Roses" (Stalley)	Kebu; Childish Major	3:49
9.	"Know You Better" (Omarion featuring Fabolous & Pusha T)	Rock City; The Co-Captains	4:50
10.	"Say Don't Go" (Omarion)	SK	4:09
11.	"What Ya Used To" (Rockie Fresh featuring Hit-Boy)	Hit-Boy	4:00
12.	"The Great Americans" (Rick Ross featuring Gunplay, Rockie Fresh & Fabolous)	Jake One; Swish (co.)	4:10
13.	"Kilo" (Meek Mill featuring Louie V Gutta, French Montana & Yo Gotti)	DJ Spinz	4:22
14.	"Poor Decisions" (Wale featuring Lupe Fiasco & Rick Ross)	Jake One; Swish (co.)	5:06
15.	"Bout That Life" (Rick Ross featuring French Montana, Diddy & Meek Mill)	The MeKanics	6:15
16.	"God Is Great" (Rockie Fresh)	Boi-1da; The Maven Boys	3:40

Best Buy deluxe edition bonus tracks
No.	Title	Producer(s)	Length
17.	"My Man" (Rick Ross featuring Meek Mill & Rockie Fresh)	The Underclassmen	4:30
18.	"Paris" (Stalley featuring Omarion & Rockie Fresh)	Soundtrakk	4:00

Samples

- "Bout That Life" contains a sample of a promo by Ric Flair

== Chart positions ==
=== Weekly charts ===
Chart (2013)	Peak position
French Albums (SNEP)	182
US Billboard 200	4
US Top R&B/Hip-Hop Albums (Billboard)	1

=== Year-end charts ===
Chart (2013)	Position
US Top R&B/Hip-Hop Albums	62

Hosted By DJ Scream
