= Welcome to JFK =

Studio album by Chinx
- Released: August 14, 2015
- Recorded: 2014–15
- Genre: Hip hop
- Length: 48:38
- Labels: eOne; Coke Boys; Riot Squad; NuSense
- Producers: Chinx (exec.); Biggs (exec.); Austin Powerz; Blickie Blaze; Bkorn; K-Beatz; Lee on the Beats; OceanOnTheRocks; OZ; Remo the Hitmaker; Roc da Producer; Young Stokes

Chinx chronology
Cocaine Riot 5 (2014)	Welcome to JFK (2015)	Legends Never Die (2016)

Singles from Welcome to JFK
- 1. "On Your Body" Released: June 2, 2015

Welcome to JFK is the debut studio album by American hip hop recording artist Chinx. It was released on August 14, 2015, by Entertainment One Music, Coke Boys Records, Riot Squad and NuSense Music Group. It was released posthumously following his death on May 17, 2015.

== Singles ==
The album's lead single, called "On Your Body" featuring Meet Sims, was released on June 2, 2015. On July 28, 2015, the music video was released for "On Your Body" featuring Meet Sims.

== Critical reception ==
Professional ratings
Review scores
Source	Rating
AllMusic	3.5/5 stars
HipHopDX	3.5/5 stars
XXL	(XL)

Welcome to JFK received generally positive reviews from music critics. Keith Nelson Jr. of HipHopDX said, "Welcome to JFK will forever shrouded in “What if’s,” even if Chinx's management promises future projects. But, in the end, Chinx crafted a debut album strong enough to support springboarding him into creative areas we never did, and never will, see him reach." David Jeffries of AllMusic said, "A well-rounded effort with plenty of promise, the posthumous Welcome to JFK is one bittersweet victory."

== Commercial performance ==
The album debuted at number 21 on the Billboard 200, selling 14,600 copies in the United States.

== Track listing ==
Album credits adapted from official liner notes.

No.	Title	Writer(s)	Producer(s)	Length
1.	"Experimental"	Lionel Pickens; Timothy Stokes; Doug Ellison; Corneal Williams; Austin Schindler	Young Stokes; Roc da Producer; Austin Powerz	3:52
2.	"Far Rock" (featuring Stack Bundles)	Pickens; Rayquon Elliott; Derwin Armstrong; Ellison	Blickie Blaze	2:54
3.	"Go Get It"	Pickens; Stokes; Ellison	Young Stokes	3:00
4.	"The Other Side" (featuring Ty Dolla Sign)	Pickens; Remo Green; Tyrone Griffin, Jr.	OceanOnTheRocks; Remo the Hitmaker	3:40
5.	"Yay"	Pickens; Armstrong; Ellison; Turrell Sims	Blickie Blaze	4:07
6.	"Thug Love" (featuring Jeremih)	Pickens; Anthony Norris; Kyle Abacan; Khaled Khaled; Andrew Neely	Lee on the Beats; K-Beatz	4:19
7.	"How to Get Rich"	Pickens; Stokes; Ellison; Sims	Young Stokes	4:28
8.	"On Your Body" (featuring Meet Sims)	Pickens; Turell Sims; Norris; Brandon Korn; Khaled; Ellison	Lee on the Beats; Bkorn	3:07
9.	"Don't Mind Me" (featuring Meet Sims)	Pickens; Sims; Ellison; Norris; Korn; Khaled	Lee on the Beats; Bkorn	4:06
10.	"Pray" (featuring Lil Durk)	Pickens; Durk Banks; Armstrong; Ellison	Blickie Blaze	4:02
11.	"Hey Fool" (featuring Nipsey Hussle and Zack)	Pickens; Ermias Asghedom; Zakaria Kharbouch; Ozan Yildirim; Ellison	OZ	3:53
12.	"Die Young" (featuring Meet Sims, French Montana and Zack)	Pickens; Armstrong; Ellison; Sims; Karim Kharbouch; Z. Kharbouch	Blickie Blaze	7:09
Total length:				48:38

== Personnel ==
Performers

- Chinx – primary artist
- Stack Bundles – featured artist (track 2)
- Ty Dolla Sign – featured artist (track 4)
- Jeremih – featured artist (track 6)
- Meet Sims – featured artist (tracks 8, 9, 12)
- Nipsey Hussle – featured artist (track 11)
- Zack – featured artist (tracks 11, 12)
- French Montana – featured artist (track 12)

Production

- Young Stokes – producer (tracks 1, 3, 7)
- Roc da Producer – producer (track 1)
- Austin Powerz – producer (track 1)
- Blickie Blaze – producer (tracks 2, 5, 10, 12)
- Remo the Hitmaker – producer (track 4)
- Lee on the Beats – producer (tracks 6, 8, 9)
- K-Beatz – producer (track 6)
- Bkorn – producer (tracks 8, 9)
- OZ – producer (track 11)

Technical

- Doug Ellison – mixing (all tracks)
- Alex DeYoung – mastering (all tracks)
- Young Stokes – recording (tracks 1, 3, 4, 6–9)
- A Kid Named Cus – mixing (tracks 1–7, 9–12)
- Derwin Armstrong – mixing (tracks 1–7, 9–12)
- Blickie Blaze – recording (tracks 2, 5, 10–12)
- Bob Horn – mixing (track 8)

== Charts ==
Chart (2015)	Peak position
US Billboard 200	21
US Top Rap Albums (Billboard)	2
US Independent Albums (Billboard)	2
