= Legends Never Die (Chinx album) =

Studio album by Chinx
- Released: September 16, 2016
- Genre: Hip hop
- Length: 50:17
- Label: eOne; Coke Boys; Riot Squad; NuSense
- Producer: Chinx (also exec.); Doug "Biggs" Ellison (exec.); Austin Powerz; Blickie Blaze; DJ Amazin; Harry Fraud; Lee on the Beats; Mae N. Maejor; Remo the Hitmaker; Smash David; Young Stokes

Chinx chronology
Welcome to JFK (2015)	Legends Never Die (2016)

Singles from Legends Never Die
- 1. "For the Love" Released: April 11, 2016; 2. "Like This" Released: May 17, 2016

Legends Never Die is the second and final studio album by American hip hop recording artist Chinx. The album was released on September 16, 2016, by Entertainment One Music, Coke Boys Records, Riot Squad and NuSense Music Group.

== Singles ==
On April 11, 2016, the album's lead single "For the Love" featuring Meet Sims was released. On May 17, 2016, the album's second single "Like This" featuring Chrisette Michele and Meet Sims was released.

== Track listing ==
No.	Title	Writer(s)	Producer(s)	Length
1.	"Like This" (featuring Chrisette Michele and Meet Sims)	Lionel Pickens; Chrisette Payne; Derwin Armstrong; Doug Ellison; Turrell Sims	Young Stokes	3:13
2.	"Match That"	Pickens; Austin Schindler; Samuel Jimenez; Anthony Norris	Smash David; Austin Powerz; Lee on the Beats	3:28
3.	"Hold Up"	Pickens; Armstrong; Ellison	Blickie Blaze	3:37
4.	"Around Me"	Pickens; Armstrong; Ellison	Blickie Blaze	3:13
5.	"All Good" (featuring Riot Squad)	Pickens; Ellison; Timothy Stokes; Malcom Barrau; Darryl Bynoe; Brian Wilson Jr.; Rayquon Elliott	Young Stokes; DJ Amazin	4:39
6.	"For the Love" (featuring Meet Sims)	Pickens; Stokes; Ellison; Sims	Young Stokes	3:14
7.	"Crown Royal"	Pickens; Armstrong; Ellison	Blickie Blaze	4:00
8.	"Legendary" (featuring Mavado and French Montana)	Pickens; Armstrong; Ellison; Rory Quigley; David Brooks; Karim Kharbouch	Harry Fraud; Blickie Blaze	4:00
9.	"Top of the Year" (featuring Meet Sims)	Pickens; Stokes; Ellison	Young Stokes	3:03
10.	"WTF They On"	Pickens; Armstrong; Ellison	Blickie Blaze	3:39
11.	"Yeah I Do" (featuring Meet Sims)	Webster; Sims; Jimenez; Norris; Ellison; Amon ChibIya II; Khaled Khaled	Smash David; Mae N. Maejor; Lee on the Beats	5:41
12.	"Slide Up In Ya Bitch"	Pickens; Armstrong; Ellison	Blickie Blaze	2:47
13.	"Real Bitch"	Pickens; Hardy Donte Bell; Remo Green	Remo the Hitmaker	3:18

Bonus track
No.	Title	Writer(s)	Producer(s)	Length
14.	"Same Ol' Hood" (featuring Meet Sims)	Pickens; Stokes; Ellison; Sims	Young Stokes	3:30
Total length:				50:17

== Charts ==
Chart (2016)	Peak position
US Billboard 200	121
US Top R&B/Hip-Hop Albums (Billboard)	8
