= Suffering from Success =

Studio album by DJ Khaled
- Released: October 22, 2013
- Recorded: 2012–2013
- Genre: Hip-hop
- Length: 53:28
- Labels: We the Best; Cash Money; Republic
- Producers: DJ Khaled (exec.); Ronald "Slim Tha Don" Williams (exec.); Bryan "Baby Birdman" Williams (also exec.); Dwayne "The President" Carter (also exec.); Armzhouse Records; Arthur McArthur; Allen Ritter; Beewirks; Bkorn; Boi-1da; Canei Finch; Cool & Dre; DJ Frass; DJ Nasty & LVM; Lee on the Beats; Noah "40" Shebib; J.U.S.T.I.C.E. League; J. Cole; JA Productions; Kane Beatz; Rico Beats; Robert Bullock; Rugah Rahj; Streetrunner; Tha Bizness; The Beat Bully; The Runners; Timbaland; Vinylz; Young Chop

DJ Khaled chronology
Kiss the Ring (2012)	Suffering from Success (2013)	I Changed a Lot (2015)

Singles from Suffering from Success
- 1. "No New Friends" Released: April 19, 2013; 2. "I Wanna Be with You" Released: August 2, 2013

Suffering from Success is the seventh studio album by American disc jockey and record producer DJ Khaled. It was released on October 22, 2013, by We the Best Music Group, Cash Money Records, and Republic Records. The album has guest appearances from Future, Ace Hood, Rick Ross, Meek Mill, T.I., Swizz Beatz, Puff Daddy, Big Sean, French Montana, 2 Chainz, Timbaland, Plies, Lil Wayne, Chris Brown, Wale, Wiz Khalifa, Nicki Minaj, Drake, Mavado, J. Cole, Bas, Scarface, Jadakiss, Akon, John Legend, Anthony Hamilton, Birdman, Vado, Jeremih, and Kat Dahlia. Producers include DJ Khaled, Boi-1da, J.U.S.T.I.C.E. League, Arthur McArthur, Timbaland, Streetrunner, Young Chop and Lee on the Beats.

Suffering from Success was supported by two singles, "No New Friends" featuring Lil Wayne, Drake and Rick Ross, and "I Wanna Be with You" featuring Nicki Minaj, Future and Ross. The album was met with mixed reviews from music critics and debuted at number 7 on the US Billboard 200.

== Background ==
On January 17, 2013, DJ Khaled announced that he had begun working on his seventh album, titled Suffering from Success. In January 2013, during an interview with MTV News, DJ Khaled explained where the album title came from, saying:

We just got done turning in Ross' album, and you know people don't realize, when you turn in an album, it's a lot of work behind the scenes; from clearing records, dealing with lawyers, sample clearances, mix and mastering, marketing plan. At that time, I'm running around and I notice a big bald spot on my beard that kept getting bigger and bigger. I'm acting like I don't want to see it, I'm brushing it away and it kept getting it bigger and bigger. So When I finally got home off the road, I was like you know what, "I'm gonna go to the doctors." I don't like going to the doctors, so I go, and she's like it's a disorder that comes from your nerves and your stress, but she said "I'm going to give you medication, and I'll see you back in 4 months." Through that whole process while I'm at the doctor's office, my phone's ringing, I'm dealing with marketing people, I'm dealing with lawyers, I'm dealing with Ross, I'm dealing with personal shit, a whole bunch of shit at the same time. It didn't stop, she's thinking I'm crazy. So she gave me my medicine and all that, and she found out who I was, and after watching that 45 minute doctor's session, she grabbed my shoulder and she just goes, "Son, you're suffering from success." I looked at her and was like, "That might be the realest thing you can tell me," and it opened my mind up like, success comes with stress, and happiness. So I'm driving home from the doctor's office and I'm like, "that's gonna be the name of my new album, Suffering From Success."

On June 10, 2013, it was announced that the album would be released on September 24, 2013. On July 31, 2013, the album cover was released. On August 26, 2013, DJ Khaled announced the album has been pushed back from September 24, 2013, to October 22, 2013.

== Guest appearances ==
In these early reports from MTV, it said that the album would include the features from Lil Wayne, Rick Ross and Kanye West. Drake, Future and Nicki Minaj, which would be featured on the first two singles. In May 2013, Khaled also confirmed to be working with Big Sean on the album. On August 26, 2013, on a vlog, it was revealed that Khaled was in the studio with Meek Mill, Vado, Birdman, Juelz Santana, Ace Hood, Mavado, and Swizz Beatz. On September 12, 2013, American rapper Scarface announced that Akon and himself, would be featured on the album. On September 27, 2013, Khaled revealed that President Barack Obama would be featured on the album in an unspecified way. On October 6, 2013, the final track listing was released, revealing guest appearances on the album from Future, Ace Hood, Diddy, Meek Mill, Rick Ross, T.I., Swizz Beatz, 2 Chainz, French Montana, Big Sean, Timbaland, Plies, Lil Wayne, Chris Brown, Wiz Khalifa, Wale, Nicki Minaj, Drake, Mavado, Bas, Jeremih, J. Cole, Akon, Anthony Hamilton, Jadakiss, John Legend, Scarface, Birdman, Vado and Kat Dahlia.

== Singles ==
On April 14, 2013, DJ Khaled released a promotional video for Suffering from Success, and the first single, called "No New Friends" featuring Drake, Rick Ross and Lil Wayne, which was released on April 19, 2013. The music video was shot on May 15 and 16, 2013 in Miami, Florida and featured cameos by Ace Hood and Birdman among others. The music video for "No New Friends" premiered on MTV Jams on June 9, 2013, and was co-directed by Colin Tilley and Drake. "No New Friends" has peaked at number 37 on the Billboard Hot 100.

On July 25, 2013, Khaled publicly "proposed" to fellow Cash Money artist Nicki Minaj via MTV. He supported his offer with a 10 karat diamond ring from Rafaello & Co., valued at about $500,000. Later, he reaffirmed his proposal in an interview with Power 106's DJ Felli Fel, stating: "I ain't a young boy no more. I'm on my thinking the future. I just had to be honest. I always liked her. She's my friend, of course. And I like her. It's more than a crush." On July 29, 2013, in an interview with Funkmaster Flex, Minaj denied Khaled's proposal, saying: "Khaled is my brother and Khaled was not serious with that damn proposal, ya'll. Please let it go. He was kidding." On the same day, Flex premiered Khaled's new single, titled "I Wanna Be with You" which featured Minaj; as well as frequent collaborators Future and Rick Ross. This led some to believe that his proposal was a "publicity stunt" to promote his new single. Shortly after the song's release, Khaled confirmed it was all a joke and a way to introduce the record. The music video was shot in Miami, Florida on August 9, 2013. On September 3, 2013, the music video for "I Wanna Be with You" premiered on MTV Jams.

On October 17, 2013, DJ Khaled released a making of video for the song "Never Surrender" featuring Scarface, Akon, Jadakiss, Meek Mill, Anthony Hamilton, and John Legend. The following day the audio to the song was premiered. Then on October 20, 2013, the song's music video was released. The video shows a "crew of drug dealers that gets unraveled when one of their own gets caught and snitches on the rest of them".

== Critical reception ==
Professional ratings
Aggregate scores
Source	Rating
Metacritic	56/100
Review scores
Source	Rating
AllMusic	3.5/5 stars
The Boston Globe	(mixed)
Exclaim!	5/10
HipHopDX	2.5/5 stars
Music Is My Oxygen	2.5/5 stars
The New York Times	(mixed)
RapReviews	4/10
XXL	(L)

Suffering from Success was met with generally mixed reviews from music critics. At Metacritic, which assigns a normalized rating out of 100 to reviews from mainstream critics, the album received an average score of 56, based on 6 reviews, indicating "mixed or average reviews".

Omar Burgess of HipHopDX gave the album two and a half stars out of five, saying "It's unfortunate that repetitive material and songs that are just overall poorly executed mar such moments. From his extensive work as a DJ, producer and an executive producer, DJ Khaled clearly knows what wins. And if you find yourself at a nightclub or party, it's very likely a song found on Suffering From Success will serve as your theme song for the night. But coming from someone who has been so influential for the better part of the last decade, DJ Khaled's latest has very little utility beyond the velvet rope." Erin Lowers of Exclaim! gave the album a five out of ten, saying "While DJ Khaled has the power to curate a memorable album with the producers and artists featured, this record fails to stick. Despite being titled Suffering from Success, what it's actually ailing it is a lack of originality."

Sheldon Pearce of XXL gave the album an L, saying "Suffering From Success is Khaled's first full step back since becoming the premiere DJ for crafting rap hits in the mid-2000s. He simply doesn't provide enough flash to continue his meteoric ascent toward becoming an independently viable brand. If you want to talk the talk, you've got to walk the walk. The barometer for his success will always be the quantifiable impact of his records and the buzz they generate in the hip-hop community, and there are very few buzz worthy records present here. Khaled will undoubtedly continue to bring the same bravado, after all… all he does is win." David Jeffries of AllMusic gave the album three and a half stars out of five, saying "Khaled does his usual cheerleading and gets some production credits himself, but the real trick he pulls off is inspiring all these artists to somehow save up all these high-grade club tracks and singles for the DJ's annual dispatch. Suffering from Success, once again." Grant Jones of RapReviews gave the album a four out of ten, saying "Decidedly hit and miss, it's the songs that stray beyond the typical tales of money, sex and cars that are worth returning to, and while I'm not saying anybody should wholeheartedly embrace baldness, maybe ten years of partying has taken its toll."

== In popular culture ==
In 2017, the album's cover art and its title became a subject of image macros posted on Facebook, Reddit, and Twitter, where it gained more attention in the following year.

== Commercial performance ==
The album debuted at number 7 on the Billboard 200, with first-week sales of 27,000 copies in the United States. In its second week, the album dropped to number 28, selling 9,000 more copies. In its third week the album sold 5,000 more copies. In its fourth week, the album sold 3,000 more copies bringing its total album sales to 44,000 copies.

== Track listing ==
No.	Title	Writer(s)	Producer(s)	Length
1.	"Obama (Winning More Interlude)"			0:44
2.	"Suffering from Success" (featuring Future and Ace Hood)	Khaled Khaled; Antoine McColister; Nayvadius Wilburn; Tyree Pittman; Johnny Mollings, Lenny Mollings	Young Chop; DJ Khaled^{[a]}; DJ Nasty & LVM^{[b]}	3:30
3.	"I Feel Like Pac / I Feel Like Biggie" (featuring Rick Ross, Meek Mill, T.I., Swizz Beatz and Puff Daddy)	Khaled; William Roberts II; Robert Williams; Clifford Harris, Jr.; Kasseem Dean; Sean Combs; Anthony Tucker	The Beat Bully	3:59
4.	"You Don't Want These Problems" (featuring Big Sean, Rick Ross, French Montana, 2 Chainz, Meek Mill, Ace Hood and Timbaland)	Khaled; Sean Anderson; R. Williams; Karim Karbouch; Tauheed Epps; Roberts II; McColister; Timothy Mosley; Kevin Cossom; J. Mollings; L. Mollings; Anthony Norris	DJ Khaled; Timbaland; DJ Nasty & LVM^{[a]}; Lee on the Beats^{[a]}	4:36
5.	"Blackball" (featuring Future, Plies and Ace Hood)	Khaled; Wilburn; Algernod Washington; McColister; Kevin Crow, Erik Ortiz	J.U.S.T.I.C.E. League	3:59
6.	"No Motive" (featuring Lil Wayne)	Khaled; Dwayne Carter, Jr.; Nicholas Warwar; R. Pasco	Streetrunner; Rugah Rahj^{[a]}	2:44
7.	"I'm Still" (featuring Chris Brown, Wale, Wiz Khalifa and Ace Hood)	Khaled; Christopher Brown; Olubowale Akintimehin; Cameron Thomaz; McColister; Cossom; Norris; Brandon Korn	Lee on the Beats; Bkorn; DJ Khaled^{[a]}	4:52
8.	"I Wanna Be with You" (featuring Nicki Minaj, Rick Ross and Future)	Khaled; Onika Maraj; Wilburn; Roberts II; Norris	Lee on the Beats; DJ Khaled^{[a]}	4:12
9.	"No New Friends" (featuring Drake, Rick Ross and Lil Wayne)	Khaled; Aubrey Graham; Roberts II; Carter, Jr.; N. Cobey; Matthew Samuels; Noah Shebib; Anderson Hernandez; Allen Ritter	Boi-1da; Noah "40" Shebib; Vinylz^{[b]}; Robert Bullock^{[a]}	5:08
10.	"Give It All to Me" (performed by Mavado and Nicki Minaj)	Khaled; David Brooks; Maraj; J. Arison	JA Productions	3:34
11.	"Hells Kitchen" (featuring J. Cole and Bas)	Khaled; Jermaine Cole; Abbas Hamad; Canei Finch	J. Cole; Canei Finch^{[b]}	4:07
12.	"Never Surrender" (featuring Scarface, Jadakiss, Meek Mill, Akon, John Legend and Anthony Hamilton)	Khaled; Brad Jordan; Jason Phillips; R. Williams; Aliaune Thiam; John Stephens; Anthony Hamilton; Cossom; Warwar	Streetrunner; DJ Khaled	6:25
13.	"Murcielago (Doors Go Up)" (featuring Birdman and Meek Mill)	Khaled; Bryan Williams; R. Williams; Andre Lyon; Marcello Valenzano	Cool & Dre	2:44
14.	"Black Ghost" (featuring Vado)	Teeyon Winfree; Bobby Yewah	Beewirks	2:53
Total length:				53:28

Deluxe edition (bonus tracks)
No.	Title	Writer(s)	Producer(s)	Length
15.	"Take That Off" (performed by Vado featuring Jeremih)	Winfree; Jeremih Felton	Rico Beats	4:08
16.	"Weed & Hennessy" (performed by Mavado)	Brooks; Andre Gordon; Jordan McClure; David Hayle	DJ Frass	2:39
Total length:				60:15

Best Buy deluxe edition (bonus tracks)
No.	Title	Writer(s)	Producer(s)	Length
17.	"Helen Keller" (featuring Kat Dahlia)	Khaled; Katriana Huguet	Arthur McArthur	3:33
18.	"At the Top (It's Just Us)" (featuring Mavado)	Brooks	Armzhouse Records	3:05
Total length:				66:53

Notes

- Track listing and credits from album booklet.
- ^{^a} signifies a co-producer
- ^{^b} signifies an additional producer
- “No New Friends” features uncredited vocals by Future

== Charts ==
=== Weekly charts ===
Chart (2013)	Peak position
UK R&B Albums (Official Charts)	21
US Billboard 200	7
US Top R&B/Hip-Hop Albums (Billboard)	2

=== Year-end charts ===
Chart (2013)	Position
US Top R&B/Hip-Hop Albums	86
