= Gold Slugs =

Single by DJ Khaled featuring Chris Brown, August Alsina and Fetty Wap

from the album I Changed a Lot
- Released: October 12, 2015
- Recorded: 2015
- Genre: Hip hop; R&B
- Length: 4:22
- Label: We the Best; RED; Sony
- Songwriters: Khaled Khaled; Andre Lyon; Willie Maxwell; Sean McMillion; Ralph Jeanty
- Producers: DJ Khaled; The Exclusives; Lee on the Beats

DJ Khaled singles chronology
"How Many Times" (2015)	"Gold Slugs" (2015)	"For Free" (2016)

Chris Brown singles chronology
"Sorry" (2015)	"Gold Slugs" (2015)	"Back to Sleep" (2015)

August Alsina singles chronology
"Bottom of the Bottle" (2015)	"Gold Slugs" (2015)	"Song Cry" (2015)

Fetty Wap singles chronology
"1Hunnid" (2015)	"Gold Slugs" (2015)	"Bang My Head" (2015)

"Gold Slugs" is a song by DJ Khaled, released by We the Best Music Group, RED and Sony Music on October 12, 2015 as the fourth single from Khaled's eighth studio album I Changed a Lot (2015). It features guest appearances from Chris Brown, August Alsina and Fetty Wap, the latter two co-wrote the song with Khaled, Andre Lyon, Lee on the Beats and the Exclusives. The latter two also produced the track.

== Music video ==
A music video for the track premiered on October 12, 2015, via WorldStarHipHop. On October 16, 2015, it was uploaded to Khaled's Vevo channel. It features DJ Khaled, Chris Brown, August Alsina, Fetty Wap and models behind Khaled's restaurant, The Licking, singing and dancing.

== Charts ==
Chart (2015)	Peak position
Netherlands (Single Tip)	26
Swedish Heatseeker (Sverigetopplistan)	15
UK Singles (Official Charts Company)	121
US Bubbling Under Hot 100 (Billboard)	19
US Hot R&B/Hip-Hop Songs (Billboard)	49
US R&B/Hip-Hop Airplay (Billboard)	44

== Certifications ==
Certifications for "Gold Slugs"
Region	Certification	Certified units/sales
Australia (ARIA)	Gold	35,000^{‡}
New Zealand (RMNZ)	Platinum	30,000^{‡}
United States (RIAA)	Gold	500,000^{‡}
^{‡} Sales+streaming figures based on certification alone.
