= Born 2 Rap =

2019 album by The Game

Studio album by the Game
- Released: November 29, 2019
- Recorded: 2018–19
- Genres: Hip-hop; West Coast hip-hop
- Length: 90:12
- Labels: Prolific; SPV; Fifth Amendment; eOne
- Producers: The Game; Stat Quo; Cash "Wack100" Jones; Chris "Big Duke" Malloy; Azzouz; BongoByTheWay; Buddah Bless; DJ Khalil; Ed Sheeran; Focus...; Jacob Reske; Mike Wavvs; Mike Zombie; Nabeyin; Prince Productions; Reske; Sly; Bags Of Shyt; Streetrunner; Swizz Beatz; Tec Beatz; Titus E. Johnson; Track King Cole; Travis Barker; Wallis Lane

The Game chronology
1992 (2016)	Born 2 Rap (2019)	Drillmatic – Heart vs. Mind (2022)

Singles from Born 2 Rap
- 1. "West Side" Released: June 21, 2019; 2. "Stainless" Released: November 1, 2019

Born 2 Rap is the ninth studio album by American rapper the Game. It was released on November 29, 2019, via Prolific Records, SPV, Fifth Amendment Entertainment, and eOne Music. Its release coincided with the Game's fortieth birthday. It was advertised as his final album before retiring, although Game resumed his recording career in 2021. It features guest appearances from Dom Kennedy, Ed Sheeran, 21 Savage, Anderson .Paak, Bryson Tiller, Chris Brown, D Smoke, J. Stone, Just Liv, Masego, Marsha Ambrosius, Miguel, Mozzy, Nipsey Hussle, Osbe Chill, Red Café, Sly Pyper, ToBi, Travis Barker and Trey Songz.

== Background ==
The Game announced Born 2 Rap as his final album, stating on social media: "I've had a great run & surpassed my rap goals a long time ago. It will always be 'QUALITY' over 'QUANTITY' from where I stand. The REAL music will always prevail & this album will cap off an amazing run".

In 2019, The Game was found guilty of sexually assaulting Priscilla Rainey, a contestant on She's Got Game. Rainey was awarded $7,000,000 in damages, plus the royalties to the album. The Game's manager Wack 100 claimed that he owned all the royalties to the album, and that he doesn't owe her anything.

== Critical reception ==
Professional ratings
Aggregate scores
Source	Rating
Metacritic	82/100
Review scores
Source	Rating
AllMusic	4/5 stars
HipHopDX	3.4/5
NME	4/5 stars
RapReviews	9/10

Born 2 Rap was met with widespread critical acclaim. At Metacritic, which assigns a weighted average rating out of 100 to reviews from mainstream publications, this release received an average score of 82, based on four reviews.

RapReviews.com critic Steve 'Flash' Juon said, "Both the length and the effort he put into it justify why it took over three years for it to come out and all the bases are covered here. ... It's hard to find anything to complain about". AllMusic's Fred Thomas said, "It's a dense volume of street storytelling and especially reflective lyricism from this rap MVP, and even at its extensive running time, Born 2 Rap delivers lots of highlights". Will Lavin of NME said, "Born 2 Rap isn't just a library of classic records blended together: it's a lesson in storytelling, something The Game has never received enough credit for. ... There's a flawless project somewhere among the album's 25 tracks, which could certainly do with trimming". Aaron McKrell of HipHopDX said, "As it stands, Born 2 Rap is a proclaimed swan song that feels more like a playlist. Let's hope Jayceon has one more in him".

== Track listing ==
Born 2 Rap track listing
No.	Title	Writer(s)	Producer(s)	Length
1.	"City of Sin" (featuring Ed Sheeran)	Jayceon Taylor; Ed Sheeran; Stanley Benton; Cash Jones; Titus Johnson; Tyron Douglas	Buddah Bless; Titus E Johnson	1:43
2.	"No Smoke" (featuring Miguel and Travis Barker)	Taylor; Miguel Jontel Pimentel; Travis Barker; Benton; C. Jones; Nima Jahanbin; Paimon Jahanbin; Amir Motamedi; Edgar Panford	Wallis Lane; Travis Barker; Nabeyin; Prince Productions	3:19
3.	"Five Hundred Dollar Candles" (featuring Dom Kennedy)	Taylor; Dominic Hunn; Benton; C. Jones; N. Jahanbin; P. Jahanbin; Amir Motamedi	Wallis Lane; Prince Productions; Mike Wavvs	4:47
4.	"The Light"	Taylor; Benton; C. Jones; Brandon Sewell; Bruce Malament; Norman William Harris; Robert Caldwell	Brandon "Tec Beatz" Sewell	3:18
5.	"Carmen Electra" (featuring Mozzy, Osbe Chill and TOBi)	Taylor; Timothy Patterson; Irshaad Boothe El; Oluwatobi Ajibolade; Benton; C. Jones; Sewell; Christopher Martin; Michael D'Angelo Archer	Brandon "Tec Beatz" Sewell	4:16
6.	"Dead Homies" (featuring Red Café)	Taylor; Jermaine Denny; Benton; C. Jones; N. Jahanbin; P. Jahanbin; Amir Motamedi	Wallis Lane; Prince Productions; Mike Wavvs; Reske	2:53
7.	"Gold Daytonas" (featuring Dom Kennedy)	Taylor; Hunn; Benton; C. Jones; N. Jahanbin; P. Jahanbin; Amir Motamedi; Chris Anthony Malloy Jr.; James Bedford; Roy Ayers; Sylvia Striplin	Wallis Lane; Prince Productions; Chris "Big Duke" Malloy	2:37
8.	"West Side"	Taylor; Benton; C. Jones; N. Jahanbin; P. Jahanbin; Amir Motamedi; Chris Anthony Malloy Jr.	Wallis Lane; Prince Productions; Chris "Big Duke" Malloy	2:50
9.	"40 Ounce Love" (featuring Just Liv)	Taylor; Olivia Walker; Benton; C. Jones; Sewell; Johnson; Elbernita Clark	Brandon "Tec Beatz" Sewell	2:57
10.	"Gucci Flip Flops"	Taylor; Benton; C. Jones; Kasseem Dean; David Willis; Lonnie Liston; Nasir Jones; Peter O. Phillips; Shawn Carter; Terry Holloway	Swizz Beatz	3:43
11.	"Born 2 Rap"	Taylor; Benton; C. Jones; Sewell; Malloy Jr.; Johnson	Brandon "Tec Beatz" Sewell; Chris "Big Duke" Malloy	4:00
12.	"Welcome Home" (featuring Nipsey Hussle)	Taylor; Ermias Asghedom; Benton; C. Jones; Lamont Dozier	BongoByTheWay	4:33
13.	"Help Me (Interlude)" (featuring Sly)	Taylor; Sylvester Jordan	Sly	2:18
14.	"I Didn't Wanna Write This Song" (featuring Marsha Ambrosius)	Taylor; Marsha Ambrosius; Hunn; Benton; C. Jones; Bernard Edwards Jr.; Larry Blackmon	Focus...	4:21
15.	"The Code" (featuring 21 Savage)	Taylor; She'yaa Bin Abraham-Joseph; Benton; C. Jones; Sewell; Amir Motamedi; Malloy Jr.; Reuben Bell; Jerry Strickland	Brandon "Tec Beatz" Sewell; Prince Productions; Chris "Big Duke" Malloy; Titus E Johnson	5:49
16.	"Stay Down" (featuring Bryson Tiller)	Taylor; Bryson Tiller; Benton; C. Jones; Malloy Jr.; Johnson; William Michael Coleman	Chris "Big Duke" Malloy; Titus E Johnson; Mike Zombie	3:36
17.	"Hug the Block"	Taylor; Walker; Benton; C. Jones; N. Jahanbin; P. Jahanbin; Amir Motamedi	Wallis Lane; Prince Productions	4:57
18.	"Ask for Me"	Taylor; C. Jones; Khalil Abdul-Rahman	DJ Khalil	2:38
19.	"Stainless" (featuring Anderson .Paak)	Taylor; Brandon Paak Anderson; Nazir Assad; Claydes Charles Smith; Dennis Thomas; George Brown; Otha Nash; Richard Westfield; Robert Bell; Robert Mickens; Ronald Bell	Track King Cole	3:59
20.	"Gangstas Make the Girls Go Wild" (featuring Chris Brown)	Taylor; Chris Brown; Benton; C. Jones; N. Jahanbin; P. Jahanbin; Malloy Jr.; Johnson; Linda Creed; Thomas Bell	Wallis Lane; Chris "Big Duke" Malloy; Titus E Johnson	2:48
21.	"Blood Thicker Than Water" (featuring Trey Songz)	Taylor; Tremaine Neverson; Benton; C. Jones; Nicholas Warwar; Roscoe Corner	Streetrunner; Azzouz	3:47
22.	"Rewind II"	Taylor; Benton; C. Jones; Malloy Jr.	Chris "Big Duke" Malloy	2:24
23.	"One Life" (featuring J. Stone and Masego)	Taylor; Micah Davis; Randy Green; Benton; C. Jones; N. Jahanbin; P. Jahanbin; Amir Motamedi; Nina Simone	Wallis Lane; Prince Productions	5:14
24.	"Cross on Jesus Back" (featuring D Smoke)	Taylor; Daniel Anthony Farris; C. Jones; N. Jahanbin; P. Jahanbin; Malloy Jr.; Coleman	Wallis Lane; Chris "Big Duke" Malloy; Mike Zombie	3:28
25.	"Roadside" (featuring Ed Sheeran)	Taylor; Benton; C. Jones; Tyrone Lindo	Ed Sheeran	3:56
Total length:				90:12

Notes

- "Born 2 Rap" features outro vocals by Nipsey Hussle
- "I Didn't Wanna Write This Song" features additional vocals by Dom Kennedy

Sample credits

- "Five Hundred Dollar Candles" contains an excerpt from Crips and Bloods 80s Interview (2016), courtesy of CBS News, and uncredited elements of "If Light Escapes", written by April George and Matthew Thompson, and performed by April + VISTA.
- "The Light" contains samples of "Open Your Eyes", written by Bobby Caldwell, Norman Harris and Bruce Malament, and performed by Caldwell.
- "Carmen Electra" contains samples of "Devil's Pie, written by Christopher Martin and Michael D'Angelo Archer, and performed by D'Angelo.
- "Gold Daytonas" contains a sample of "Get Money", written by Roy Ayers, James Bedford, Lamont Porter, Sylvia Striplin and Christopher Wallace, and performed by Junior M.A.F.I.A.
- "Gucci Flip Flops" contains a sample from "Dead Presidents", written by Shawn Carter, Davis Willis, Lonnie Liston Smith, Nasir Jones and Peter O. Phillips, and performed by Jay-Z.
- "Welcome Home" contains samples from "Shine", written and performed by Lamont Dozier.
- "I Didn’t Wanna Write This Song" contains a sample of "I Wonder If Heaven Got A Ghetto" by 2Pac.
- "Hug the Block" contains interpolations of "Selfish", written by Aretha Franklin, R.L. Altman III, Jason Powers and Kanye West, and performed by Slum Village.
- "Stainless" contains an uncredited sample of "Winter Sadness", written by Robert "Kool" Bell and Claydes Charles Smith, and performed by Kool & the Gang.
- "Gangstas Make the Girls Go Wild" contains a sample of "People Make the World Go Round", written by Thom Bell, Linda Creed and George Perry, and performed by the Stylistics.
- "Rewind II" contains a sample of "Rewind", written by Nasir Jones, William Mitchell and Rick Rubin, and performed by Nas.
- "One Life" contains an excerpt from That Blackness, performed by Nina Simone, courtesy of the Estate of Nina Simone.
- "Roadside" contains elements of "Happier", written by Ed Sheeran, Ryan Tedder and Benny Blanco, and performed by Sheeran.
- "Blood Thicker Than Water" contains elements of "I Shall Wear A Crown" written by Deleon Richards

== Charts ==
Chart performance for Born 2 Rap
Chart (2019–2020)	Peak position
Australian Albums (ARIA)	53
Canadian Albums (Billboard)	18
Dutch Albums (Album Top 100)	70
New Zealand Albums (RMNZ)	40
Swiss Albums (Schweizer Hitparade)	66
UK Album Downloads (Official Charts)	18
UK Independent Albums (Official Charts)	35
UK R&B Albums (Official Charts)	8
US Billboard 200	19
US Independent Albums (Billboard)	5
US Top Rap Albums (Billboard)	7
US Top R&B/Hip-Hop Albums (Billboard)	10
