= No New Friends (DJ Khaled song) =

Single by DJ Khaled featuring Drake, Rick Ross and Lil Wayne

from the album Suffering from Success
- Released: April 19, 2013
- Recorded: 2013
- Genre: Hip hop; trap
- Length: 5:07
- Label: We the Best; Terror Squad; Young Money; Cash Money; Republic
- Songwriters: Aubrey Graham; William Roberts II; Dwayne Carter, Jr.; Khaled Khaled; Matthew Samuels; Noah Shebib; Anderson Hernandez
- Producers: Robert Bullock; Boi-1da; Noah "40" Shebib; Vinylz (add.)

DJ Khaled singles chronology
"I Wish You Would" (2012)	"No New Friends" (2013)	"I Wanna Be with You" (2013)

Drake singles chronology
"Started from the Bottom" (2013)	"No New Friends" (2013)	"No Guns Allowed" (2013)

Rick Ross singles chronology
"Pour It Up (Remix)" (2013)	"No New Friends" (2013)	"Poor Decisions" (2013)

Lil Wayne singles chronology
"High School" (2013)	"No New Friends" (2013)	"Wit' Me" (2013)

Music video
- "No New Friends" on YouTube

"No New Friends" is a hip hop and trap song by American disc jockey DJ Khaled, released as the lead single from his seventh studio album, Suffering from Success. The song features rappers Drake, Rick Ross and Lil Wayne, and features production from Robert Bullock, Boi-1da, Vinylz, and Noah "40" Shebib. The song was released for digital download in the United States on April 19, 2013. The song has peaked at number 37 on the US Billboard Hot 100, making it his sixth top 40 single on that chart.

== Background ==
The song was first announced by Drake on April 12, 2013, during an interview with Elliott Wilson on his EVR radio show. On April 14, 2013, DJ Khaled released a promotional video titled "No New Friends" The Movie. The song was premiered by Funkmaster Flex on April 15, 2013. The song, produced by Robert Bullock, Boi-1da, Noah "40" Shebib and Vinylz, features Drake, Rick Ross and Lil Wayne, the same rappers from Khaled's most successful hit "I'm on One". The lineup was originally the official remix to Drake's single "Started from the Bottom", but Drake decided to give the song to Khaled. The song had an earlier version that featured an outro by Atlanta rapper Future, but his vocals were taken out for unknown reasons.

== Music video ==
The song's music video was shot on May 15 and 16, 2013 in Miami, Florida. The video features cameos by Ace Hood and Birdman among others. The music video was co-directed by Colin Tilley and Drake. It premiered on MTV Jams on June 9, 2013.

== Charts ==
=== Weekly charts ===
Chart (2013)	Peak Position
US Billboard Hot 100	37
US Hot R&B/Hip-Hop Songs (Billboard)	9

=== Year-end charts ===
Chart (2013)	Position
US Hot R&B/Hip-Hop Songs (Billboard)	35
US Hot Rap Songs (Billboard)	29

== Certifications ==
Region	Certification	Certified units/sales
United States (RIAA)	Platinum	1,000,000^{‡}
^{‡} Sales+streaming figures based on certification alone.

== Radio and release history ==
List of release dates, record label and format details
Country	Date	Format	Label
United States	April 19, 2013	Digital download	We the Best; Terror Squad; Young Money; Cash Money; Republic
United States	May 21, 2013	Rhythmic contemporary radio	We the Best; Terror Squad; Young Money; Cash Money; Republic
