= Mike Zombie =

American record producer

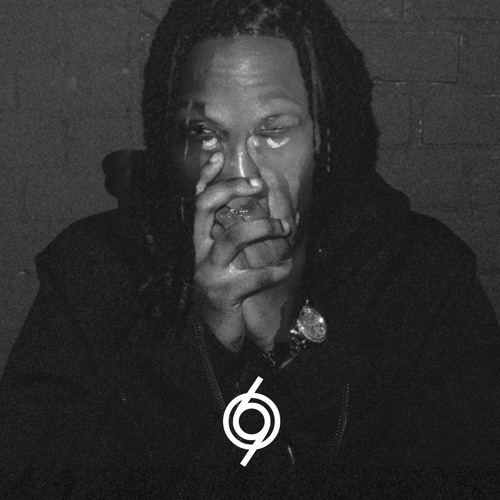
- Mike Zombie in 2016

Background information
- Also known as: The Silver Surfer, Young Z-O, ZOTT, Zombie On The Track, Humble Genius, Rebel Without A Cause, BIG ZO
- Born: William Michael Coleman; July 8, 1992 (age 34); Willingboro Township, New Jersey, U.S.
- Origin: New Brunswick, New Jersey
- Genres: Hip hop
- Occupations: Record producer; rapper; songwriter
- Years active: 2012–present
- Labels: OVO Sound; Warner; Sony ATV Publishing
- Website: mikezombie.co

William Michael Coleman (born July 8, 1992), professionally known as Mike Zombie, is an American record producer and rapper from Willingboro Township, New Jersey, where he attended Willingboro High School. Since 2012, he has been an in-house producer for Drake's label OVO Sound. His biggest production for the label was "Started from the Bottom" in 2013. His other major production credit is "They Don't Love You No More" by DJ Khaled, released a year later.

== Career ==
He is best known for the production of Drake's single "Started from the Bottom". He sampled a track titled "Ambessence piano & drones 1" by Bruno Sanfilippo & Mathias Grassow for the song. "Started from the Bottom" was the winner of "Track of the Year" at the 2013 BET Hip Hop Awards. The song was played during NBA All-Star Weekend, LeBron James' "LeBron Face" Sprite commercial", the video game NBA 2K14, and the video game Assassin's Creed 4. The song was also nominated for "Best Rap Song" at The 56th Annual Grammy Awards. In July 2013, BET named him one of the "top 10 young producers to watch out for". In October 2013, Complex named him one of the "25 new producers to watch for". He previously collaborated with battle rapper Hollow Da Don, and Hollow played an important part in putting Drake in contact with Mike Zombie.

Zombie released his first mixtape, The End of the Beginning, on December 22, 2013. Recently, he produced DJ Khaled's song "They Don't Love You No More" featuring Meek Mill, Rick Ross, Jay-Z, and French Montana. In the summer of 2014 he released his first music video from "The End of the Beginning" "616" on MTV Jams. On January 27, 2015, Zombie released a new project called "Rebel Without a Cause". In 2016, he dropped a few singles and two projects: "Humble Genius" (July 1, 2016) and a collaborate album with Benzi Ayo "Ea$tside Story" (October 1, 2016). In 2019, Zombie produced a song for The Game titled "A.I. With The Braids" featuring Lil Wayne.

== Discography ==
=== Mixtapes ===
- The End of the Beginning (2013)
- Rebel Without a Cause (2015)
- Humble Genius (2016)
- Eastside Stories (with Benzi Ayo) (2016)
- 20GREATEEN (2018)
- The Silver Tape (2019)

=== Guest appearances ===
List of non-single guest appearances, with other performing artists, showing year released and album name
Title	Year	Other artist(s)	Album
"Netflix & Chill"	2015	Ant Beale	
"Boom Bap"	2016	Sap, Hit-Boy, Hodgy Beats	Self Employed
"A LOT"	2016	Ronny J	
"Basic"	2017	Tdot illdude & City Rominicki	The Last Illustration of Tdot illdude by Thomas Jude

=== Production discography ===
Year	Title	Artist	Album
2013	"Started From The Bottom"	Drake	Nothing Was The Same
2013	"Started"	Lil Wayne	Dedication 5
2015	"They Don't Love You No More"	DJ Khaled, Jay-Z, Rick Ross, French Montana	I Changed A Lot
2015	"The Reach (Intro)"	Westside Boogie	The Reach
2016	"Aura"	Iamsu!	Kilt 3
2016	"Intro (Allstars)"	Yasin	Allstars
2016	"Wanni Wag"	Mir Fontane feat. Ish Williams	Who's Watching the Kids
2016	"Street Fame"	Casey Veggies	Customized Greatly Vol. 4: The Return of The Boy
2016	"Workin My Wrist"	Chevy Woods	Gang Shit Only
2017	"Make Me a Jersey"	Dribble2much	Locker Room
2017	"Pain Killer"	Torii Wolf	Non-album single
2017	"Overstimulated"	Jhené Aiko	Trip
2017	"Ice In My Jewels"	Roy Woods	Non-album single
2018	"Love Me No More"	Waka Flocka Flame	I Can't Rap vol. 1
2018	"Bodega"	Mir Fontane	Macaroni Tony
2019	"BIG"	Young M.A	Herstory in the Making
2019	"All Eyez On Me"	Mir Fontane	Who's Watching The Kids 2
2019	"By the Collar"	Mir Fontane	Who's Watching The Kids 2
2019	"Fetti"	Mir Fontane	Non-album single
2019	"Sinner"	24hrs	Non-album single
2019	"Stay Down"	The Game	Born 2 Rap
2019	"Cross on Jesus Back"	The Game	Born 2 Rap
2020	"Rehearsal"	Ye Ali	Traphouse Jodeci 2
2020	"Dripset"	Young M.A	Red Flu
2020	"Quarantine Party"	Young M.A	Red Flu
2020	"Trap or Cap"	Young M.A	Red Flu
2020	"Bad Bitch Anthem"	Young M.A	Red Flu
2020	"2020 Vision"	Young M.A	Red Flu
2020	"Big Steppa"	Young M.A	Non-album single
2020	"Still Alive"	Mir Fontane	Still Alive
2020	"A.I. With The Braids"	The Game	Non-album single
2020	"Step Into A Love Like This"	Lauren Hashian	Non-album single
2020	"Sirens"	Dom Kennedy	Rap N Roll
2020	"Beast"	Dougie F & Tsu Surf	Non-album single
2020	"These Demons"	Eminem	Music to Be Murdered By - Side B
2024	"Get Off Me"	Kid Cudi, Travis Scott	Insano
2026	"hiszpańska inkwizycja"	Mata	#MATA2040
