= Hold You Down (DJ Khaled song) =

Single by DJ Khaled featuring Chris Brown, August Alsina, Future and Jeremih

from the album I Changed a Lot
- Released: August 3, 2014
- Recorded: 2014
- Genre: R&B; hip-hop
- Length: 4:53
- Label: Cash Money; Young Money; Terror Squad; Republic; We the Best
- Songwriters: Jeremy Felton; Sayyid McDonald; Andre Lyon; Khaled Khaled; Nayvadius Wilburn; Brandon Korn; Anthony Norris
- Producers: Bkorn; Lee on the Beats; LDB

DJ Khaled singles chronology
"They Don't Love You No More" (2014)	"Hold You Down" (2014)	"Don't Shoot" (2014)

Chris Brown singles chronology
"New Flame" (2014)	"Hold You Down" (2014)	"Only" (2014)

August Alsina singles chronology
"No Love" (2014)	"Hold You Down" (2014)	"Hip-Hop" (2014)

Future singles chronology
"I Won" (2014)	"Hold You Down" (2014)	"Let Me Know" (2014)

Jeremih singles chronology
"Don't Tell 'Em" (2014)	"Hold You Down" (2014)	"The Body" (2014)

Music video
- "Hold You Down" on YouTube

"Hold You Down" is a song by American disc jockey DJ Khaled featuring American singers Chris Brown, August Alsina and Jeremih, and American rapper Future from the former's eighth studio album I Changed a Lot (2015). An R&B and hip-hop track, it was released by Cash Money Records, Young Money Entertainment, We the Best Music Group and Republic Records on August 3, 2014 as the album's second single.

"Hold You Down" peaked within the top 40 of the Billboard Hot 100, becoming Alsina's first top 40 entry, and Khaled's seventh. Additionally, it topped the US Hot R&B/Hip-Hop Airplay chart and received platinum certification by Recording Industry Association of America (RIAA) on August 4, 2023.

== Music video ==
The music video was filmed on July 21, 2014. The video, coinciding with the single, released on August 11, 2014 via WorldStarHipHop and made its national television debut on the popular program 106 & Park on BET as well as MTV Jams. The music video was directed by Gil Green and features Khaled's newly endorsed Bang & Olufsen headphones. In the video, all artists of the song are seen in a mansion performing the song.

== Remix ==
On November 3, 2014, DJ Khaled released the remix for "Hold You Down". On the remix, Usher sings the hook from the original song, and Rick Ross, Fabolous and Ace Hood each rap a verse. In the background of the remix, a skit from the music video of the original song can be heard.

== Charts ==
=== Weekly charts ===
Chart (2014)	Peak position
US Billboard Hot 100	39
US Hot R&B/Hip-Hop Songs (Billboard)	10
US R&B/Hip-Hop Airplay (Billboard)	1
US Rhythmic Airplay (Billboard)	10

=== Year-end charts ===
Chart (2014)	Position
US Hot R&B/Hip-Hop Songs (Billboard)	56

== Certifications ==
Region	Certification	Certified units/sales
New Zealand (RMNZ)	Gold	15,000^{‡}
United States (RIAA)	Platinum	1,000,000^{‡}
^{‡} Sales+streaming figures based on certification alone.

== Release history ==
Region	Date	Format	Label
United Kingdom	September 9, 2014	Rhythmic contemporary radio	We the Best; Cash Money; Republic
