= Do You Mind (DJ Khaled song) =

2016 single by DJ Khaled

Single by DJ Khaled featuring Nicki Minaj, Chris Brown, August Alsina, Jeremih, Future and Rick Ross

from the album Major Key
- Released: July 28, 2016
- Recorded: 2016
- Genre: Hip-hop; R&B
- Length: 5:25
- Label: We the Best; Epic
- Songwriters: Khaled Khaled; Onika Maraj; Christopher Brown; August Alsina, Jr.; Jeremy Felton; Nayvadius Wilburn; William Roberts II; Johnny Mollings; Lenny Mollings; Anthony Norris; Kevin Cossom; Sean McMillion; Ralph Jeanty
- Producers: DJ Khaled; DJ Nasty & LVM; Lee on the Beats

DJ Khaled singles chronology
"Holy Key" (2016)	"Do You Mind" (2016)	"Shining" (2017)

Nicki Minaj singles chronology
"Don't Hurt Me" (2016)	"Do You Mind" (2016)	"Side to Side" (2016)

Chris Brown singles chronology
"No Romeo No Juliet" (2016)	"Do You Mind" (2016)	"Party" (2016)

Jeremih singles chronology
"Point Seen Money Gone" (2016)	"Do You Mind" (2016)	"Summer Friends" (2016)

Future singles chronology
"X" (2016)	"Do You Mind" (2016)	"Too Much Sauce" (2016)

August Alsina singles chronology
"Dreamer" (2015)	"Do You Mind" (2016)	"Drugs" (2017)

Rick Ross singles chronology
"Purple Lamborghini" (2016)	"Do You Mind" (2016)	"Buy Back the Block" (2016)

Music video
- "Do You Mind" on YouTube

"Do You Mind" is a song by the American musician DJ Khaled featuring Nicki Minaj, Chris Brown, Jeremih, Future, August Alsina, and Rick Ross. It was released on July 28, 2016, by We the Best Music Group and Epic Records as the fourth single of the former's ninth studio album, Major Key. The song peaked at number 27 on the US Billboard Hot 100 and number 9 on the US Hot R&B/Hip-Hop Songs charts. It was eventually certified 4× Platinum by the Recording Industry Association of America (RIAA).

== Composition ==
The song samples "Lovers and Friends" performed by Lil Jon & the East Side Boyz featuring Usher and Ludacris, which also samples "Lovers and Friends" performed by Michael Sterling from his 1990 album Trouble and also contains an interpolation from Future of "Money Ain't a Thang" performed by Jermaine Dupri featuring Jay-Z.

== Chart performance ==
The single debuted at number 49 on the US Hot R&B/Hip-Hop Songs chart on the week of August 20, 2016. The following week, it debuted at number 94 on the US Billboard Hot 100 chart on the week of August 27, 2016. Eventually, the single reached its peak at number 27 on the Hot 100 and number nine on the Hot R&B/Hip-Hop Songs charts. On August 24, 2021, the single was certified 4× Platinum by the Recording Industry Association of America (RIAA) for combined sales and streaming units of over four million units in the United States.

== Music video ==
The song's music video, directed by Gil Green premiered after the 2016 BET Hip Hop Awards on October 4, 2016. It features video model Bernice Burgos as Khaled's love interest. As of January 2025, the video has over 445 million views.

=== Synopsis ===
The video begins as the camera pans down on Khaled's clothes in his mansion. His love interest (Burgos) is throwing his clothes and phone on the floor while confronting him about being home at 6:00 in the morning. The next scene shows Khaled playing the song on a grand piano while a lady seduces him. The scene cuts to Minaj where she is in an apartment sitting on a couch while twerking on an armchair. The next scene involve Brown and Alsina singing the chorus next to Khaled in a platform above a pool. After that, it shows Brown being seduced by a lady above the piano. As Alsina sings his verse, he is shown caressing his woman in the bedroom. Jeremih sings his verse next as he flirts with his woman against the wall while dancing for him. After the second chorus, Future is rapping while a few women are drinking a bottle, sporting Beats by Dre headphones and Galaxy cigarette lighters. Rick Ross raps his verse against a series of stained glass windows with his woman standing beside him. Towards the end of the video, Khaled talks to Burgos that when she doesn't stress him, he can maneuver the "jungle" while comparing his love to a king and queen revealing his new name to be "Billy". He then gives her a new necklace telling her she's "a major key to me." The video fades out as they embrace.

== Track listing ==
Digital download
No.	Title	Length
1.	"Do You Mind" (featuring Nicki Minaj, Chris Brown, August Alsina, Jeremih, Future and Rick Ross)	5:25

== Charts ==
=== Weekly charts ===
Chart (2016–17)	Peak position
Australia (ARIA)	65
Canada Hot 100 (Billboard)	93
France (SNEP)	162
New Zealand Heatseekers (Recorded Music NZ)	5
UK Singles (Official Charts)	197
US Billboard Hot 100	27
US Hot R&B/Hip-Hop Songs (Billboard)	9
US Pop Airplay (Billboard)	32
US R&B/Hip-Hop Airplay (Billboard)	5
US Rhythmic Airplay (Billboard)	2

=== Year-end charts ===
Chart (2016)	Position
US Hot R&B/Hip-Hop Songs (Billboard)	72
US Rhythmic (Billboard)	48
Chart (2017)	Position
US Hot R&B/Hip-Hop Songs (Billboard)	95

== Certifications ==
Region	Certification	Certified units/sales
Australia (ARIA)	2× Platinum	140,000^{‡}
Brazil (Pro-Música Brasil)	Gold	30,000^{‡}
Canada (Music Canada)	Gold	40,000^{‡}
New Zealand (RMNZ)	2× Platinum	60,000^{‡}
United Kingdom (BPI)	Silver	200,000^{‡}
United States (RIAA)	4× Platinum	4,000,000^{‡}
^{‡} Sales+streaming figures based on certification alone.

== Release history ==
Region	Date	Format	Label	Ref.
Worldwide	July 28, 2016	Digital download; streaming	We the Best; Epic	
