= I Wanna Be with You (DJ Khaled song) =

Single by DJ Khaled featuring Nicki Minaj, Future and Rick Ross

from the album Suffering from Success
- Released: August 2, 2013
- Recorded: 2013
- Genre: Trap
- Length: 4:11
- Label: We the Best; Terror Squad; Young Money; Cash Money; Republic
- Songwriters: William Roberts II; Onika Maraj; Khaled Khaled; Kevin Cossom; Nayvadius Wilburn
- Producers: Lee on the Beats; DJ Khaled

DJ Khaled singles chronology
"No New Friends" (2013)	"I Wanna Be with You" (2013)	"They Don't Love You No More" (2014)

Nicki Minaj singles chronology
"Love More" (2013)	"I Wanna Be with You" (2013)	"Clappers" (2013)

Future singles chronology
"Show You" (2013)	"I Wanna Be with You" (2013)	"Honest" (2013)

Rick Ross singles chronology
"Poor Decisions" (2013)	"I Wanna Be with You" (2013)	"No Games" (2013)

"I Wanna Be with You" is a song by the American musician DJ Khaled featuring rappers Nicki Minaj, Future, and Rick Ross. It was released on August 2, 2013, by We the Best Music Group, Terror Squad Entertainment, Young Money Entertainment, Cash Money Records, and Republic Records as the second single from Khaled's seventh studio album Suffering from Success (2013). The song was written by the artists and Lee on the Beats, who produced it with Khaled. It peaked at number one on the U.S. Billboard Bubbling Under Hot 100 component chart, representing the twenty-five runner-up songs to the Billboard Hot 100, and reached number 30 on the Billboard Hot R&B/Hip-Hop Songs chart.

== Background ==
On July 25, 2013, DJ Khaled publicly proposed to fellow Cash Money Records labelmate Nicki Minaj through a video uploaded onto the website for television network MTV; he additionally offered her a ten-carat Rafaello & Co. engagement ring, valued at approximately $500,000. He later reaffirmed his proposal during an interview with DJ Felli Fel of Power 106, although Minaj later stated that his offer was not intended to be taken seriously. The same day, Flex premiered Khaled's new single, titled "I Wanna Be with You" which featured Minaj, as well as frequent collaborators Future and Rick Ross. This led some to believe that his proposal was a publicity stunt to promote his new single. Shortly after the song's release, Khaled confirmed it was all a joke and a way to introduce the record.

== Music video ==
On August 9, 2013, the music video for the song was filmed. The video was filmed in Miami, Florida. Ciara was on the set for the music video despite not being featured in the song. The music video premiered on MTV Jams on September 3, 2013, and on YouTube on September 5. Mack Maine, Birdman, Ace Hood, Jim Jones, Rocko, Juelz Santana, Vado and Cam'ron all make cameo appearances in the video.

== Charts ==
Chart (2013)	Peak position
US Bubbling Under Hot 100 (Billboard)	1
US Hot R&B/Hip-Hop Songs (Billboard)	30

== Certifications ==
Region	Certification	Certified units/sales
United States (RIAA)	Gold	500,000^{‡}
^{‡} Sales+streaming figures based on certification alone.

== Release history ==
Country	Date	Format	Label	Ref.
United States	August 2, 2013	Digital download	We the Best; Terror Squad; Young Money; Cash Money; Republic Records	
United States	August 19, 2013	Rhythmic contemporary radio	We the Best; Terror Squad; Young Money; Cash Money; Republic Records	
