= We the Best Music Group =

American record label

We The Best Music Group
- Parent company: Universal Music Group
- Founded: 2008; 18 years ago
- Founder: DJ Khaled
- Distributor: Def Jam Recordings
- Genre: Hip hop
- Country of origin: United States
- Location: Miami, Florida
- Official website: https://wethebeststore.com/

We the Best Music Group is an American record label founded by DJ Khaled in 2008. Named after one of Khaled's catchphrases, it has operated as an imprint of Def Jam Recordings since 2023. Previously, the label operated an imprint of Island Def Jam's division Def Jam South (2008–2011), Universal Republic's division Cash Money Records (2011–2015), and Sony Music's division Epic Records (2016–2022). Artists who have signed to We the Best include Khaled himself, Ace Hood, Mavado, Steph Lecor, Kent Jones, Flipp Dinero, and Vado.

== Discography ==
Albums
DJ Khaled - We Global
- Released: September 16, 2008
- Chart positions: #7 U.S. Billboard 200
- RIAA certification:
- U.S. sales: 294,000
- Singles: "Out Here Grindin", "Go Hard"
Ace Hood - Gutta
- Released: November 18, 2008
- Chart positions: #36 U.S. Billboard 200
- RIAA certification:
- U.S. sales: 124,000
- Singles: "Cash Flow", "Ride"
Ace Hood - Ruthless
- Released: June 30, 2009
- Chart positions: #23 U.S. Billboard 200
- RIAA certification:
- U.S. sales: 78,100
- Singles: "Overtime","Champion"
DJ Khaled - Victory
- Released: March 2, 2010
- Chart positions: #14 U.S. Billboard 200
- RIAA certification:
- U.S. sales: 50,000
- Singles: "Fed Up", "Put Your Hands Up", "All I Do Is Win"
DJ Khaled - We the Best Forever
- Released: July 19, 2011
- Chart positions: #5 U.S. Billboard 200
- RIAA certification:
- U.S. sales: 60,000+
- Singles: "Welcome to My Hood", I'm On One", "It Ain't Over Til It's Over"
Ace Hood - Blood, Sweat & Tears
- Released: August 9, 2011
- Chart positions: #8 U.S. Billboard 200
- RIAA certification:
- U.S. sales: 80,000+
- Singles: "Hustle Hard", "Go 'N' Get It", "Body 2 Body"
DJ Khaled - Kiss the Ring
- Released: August 21, 2012
- Chart positions: #4 U.S. Billboard 200
- RIAA certification:
- U.S. sales: 80,000+
- Singles: "Take It to the Head", "I Wish You Would"
Ace Hood - Trials & Tribulations
- Released: July 16, 2013
- Chart positions: #4 U.S. Billboard 200
- RIAA certification:
- U.S. sales: 55,000+
- Singles: "Bugatti", "We Outchea"
DJ Khaled - Suffering from Success
- Released: October 22, 2013
- Chart positions: #7 U.S. Billboard 200
- RIAA certification:
- U.S. sales: 44,000+
- Singles: "No New Friends", "I Wanna Be with You"
DJ Khaled - I Changed a Lot
- Released: October 23, 2015
- Chart positions: #12 U.S. Billboard 200
- RIAA certification:
- U.S. sales: 25,000+
- Singles: "They Don't Love You No More", "Hold You Down", "How Many Times", "Gold Slugs", "You Mine"
DJ Khaled - Major Key
- Released: July 29, 2016
- Chart positions: #1 U.S. Billboard 200
- RIAA certification: Gold
- U.S. sales: 500,000+
- Singles: "For Free", "I Got the Keys", "Holy Key", "Do You Mind"
DJ Khaled - Grateful
- Released: June 23, 2017
- Chart positions: #1 U.S. Billboard 200
- RIAA certification: Platinum
- U.S. sales: 1,000,000+
- Singles: "Shining", "I'm the One", "To the Max", "Wild Thoughts"
DJ Khaled - Father of Asahd
- Released: May 17, 2019
- Chart positions: #2 U.S. Billboard 200
- RIAA certification: Gold
- U.S. sales: 500,000+
- Singles: "Top Off", "No Brainer", "Higher", "Just Us", "You Stay"
Flipp Dinero - Love for Guala
- Released: November 22, 2019
- Chart positions: #132 U.S. Billboard 200
- RIAA certification:
- U.S. sales:
- Singles: "Leave Me Alone", "How I Move", "Fritolays", "Looking at Me", "If I Tell You", "Not Too Many", "Westside"
Bad Boys for Life (soundtrack)
- Released: January 17, 2020
- Singles: "Ritmo", "Muévelo"
DJ Khaled - Khaled Khaled
- Released: April 30, 2021
- Chart positions: #1 U.S. Billboard 200
- RIAA certification: Platinum
- U.S. sales: 1,000,000+
- Singles: "Popstar", "Greece", "Every Chance I Get", "I Did It", "Body in Motion"
DJ Khaled - God Did
- Released: August 26, 2022
DJ Khaled - Aalam of God
