= Started from the Bottom =

Single by Drake

from the album Nothing Was the Same
- Released: February 1, 2013
- Recorded: 2012
- Genre: Hip hop; trap
- Length: 2:53
- Label: Aspire; OVO; Young Money; Cash Money; Republic
- Songwriters: Aubrey Graham; Noah Shebib; Michael Coleman
- Producers: Mike Zombie; Noah "40" Shebib (add.)

Drake singles chronology
"Right Here" (2013)	"Started from the Bottom" (2013)	"No New Friends" (2013)

Music video
- "Started from the Bottom" on YouTube

"Started from the Bottom" is a song by Canadian hip hop recording artist Drake, released as the first single from his third studio album Nothing Was the Same. The song was written by Drake, Michael Coleman, and Noah "40" Shebib, and it was produced by Coleman under his stage name Mike Zombie, with additional production by Shebib. It features a sample of the ambient piece "Ambessence Piano & Drones 1" by Bruno Sanfilippo. "Started from the Bottom" peaked at number six on the Billboard Hot 100.

== Background ==
"Started from the Bottom" emerged from a studio session with Drake and American rapper Future, who repeatedly requested studio personnel to "start [it] from the bottom", which would prompt a replay of the instrumental. Drake, believing the phrase referred to a song title, used the inspiration to form the overall basis of the record. "Started From the Bottom" was originally planned to be released on February 10, 2013, coinciding with the Grammy Awards. However, it was instead premiered on February 1 through Drake's "October's Very Own" blog, as he preferred to release it without prior interviews. The song was officially released on iTunes on February 6, 2013. At the 55th Grammy Awards, Drake teased that an official remix would be released.

== Music and lyrics ==
Lyrically, "Started from the Bottom" addresses Drake's early life and career beginnings. He commented of its concept, "I feel sometimes that people don't have enough information about my beginnings and therefore they make up a life story for me that isn't consistent with actual events. I did not buy my way into this spot and it was the furthest thing from easy to achieve. I am proud of every part of my past and I'm excited for this song to find a place in your life as well." The song makes use of instrumentation from drums and a piano; MTV describes it as "departure" from his earlier works.

== Music video ==
On September 4, 2012, Drake was seen filming the music video for the song which was being directed by Director X. The music video was released on February 10, 2013. The video features an all-white dressed Drake standing in the back of a white Bentley convertible, during a blizzard. In other scenes, he works retail in a Shoppers Drug Mart drugstore, flies a plane into his native Toronto and dances around in a club. Drake's mother, Sandi, and producers Boi-1da and Noah "40" Shebib also have cameos in the video. It also includes a skit by rapper OB O'Brien, Drake's cousin and friend Ryan Silverstein, and model Angelica Charrupi. At the end it displays Drake and his friends partying at a villa in the Dominican Republic.

== Remixes ==
Shortly after the song's debut Wiz Khalifa was the first to release a remix to the song. Since then artists such as Lil Wayne, Machine Gun Kelly, Bow Wow, Soulja Boy, Ace Hood, Meek Mill, Chris Brown, Papoose, Wyclef Jean, Riff Raff, Arcángel & De La Ghetto, Misha B, and Karmin have released their own remixes or freestyles to the song. On February 15, 2013, Mike Posner, Asher Roth, T. Mills, Chuck Inglish and King Chip released a music video for their remix of the song. On October 12, 2013, DJ Felli Fel released a remix supporting the Los Angeles Dodgers 2013 playoff run, featuring Ice Cube, Tyga and Ty Dolla Sign. Shortly after an extended version also featuring, Warren G, Problem and Chino XL was released.

At the 55th Grammy Awards, Drake suggested that an official remix could be released. He began work on it with Rick Ross and DJ Khaled but the recording session resulted in the first single off Khaled's next album, "No New Friends".

== Critical reception ==
Lewis Corner of Digital Spy gave the song a positive review stating:

Backdropped by a haunting piano loop and tinned snare, the production falls in line with what we've come to expect from a brooding Drake track. "Started from the bottom now we're here," he reflects. "Started from the bottom now my whole team fucking here." The ascent to stardom has clearly been the smoothest of paths, but we hope there's a little more depth to the remainder of his new material to keep him up there with the best..

On December 2, 2013, Complex named "Started From the Bottom" the second best song released in 2013. David Drake of Complex said, "Musically, "Started From the Bottom" is Drake at his most irrepressibly memorable. Stripped down to a simple piano line and a crisp, unforgettable drum pattern, the song's simplicity gave it a singular fingerprint. It epitomizes the new, clean, minimal direction Drake took throughout Nothing Was The Same, while sounding like no other song on it. It is wistful, atmospheric, as catchy as a nursery rhyme. Lyrically, the song is packed with hooks, each line a mantra of burgeoning confidence, hard-earned." Rolling Stone then ranked the song at number nine on their list of the 100 Best Songs of 2013. XXL named it one of the top five hip hop songs of 2013.

== Chart performance ==
The track entered the UK Singles Chart at number 71 on February 10, 2013. The following week it rose forty-six positions to number 25 – becoming only Drake's third top 40 entry as a solo artist in the UK. The song has reached number six on the Billboard Hot 100 and is Drake's eleventh top 10 hit on the chart. The song sold over 2 million digital copies in the US by January 2014.

== Accolades ==
Year	Ceremony	Award	Result
2013	BET Hip Hop Awards	"Track of the Year"	Won
2014	Grammy Awards (56th)	Best Rap Performance	Nominated
2014	Grammy Awards (56th)	Best Rap Song	Nominated

== Track listing ==
Digital download
No.	Title	Length
1.	"Started from the Bottom"	2:53

== Charts ==
=== Weekly charts ===
Chart (2013–2014)	Peak position
Australia (ARIA)	93
Belgium (Ultratip Bubbling Under Flanders)	50
Belgium (Ultratip Bubbling Under Wallonia)	40
Canada Hot 100 (Billboard)	36
France (SNEP)	56
Netherlands (Single Top 100)	91
UK Singles (Official Charts)	25
UK Hip Hop/R&B (Official Charts)	5
US Billboard Hot 100	6
US Hot R&B/Hip-Hop Songs (Billboard)	2
US Pop Airplay (Billboard)	40
US Rhythmic Airplay (Billboard)	1

=== Year-end charts ===
Chart (2013)	Position
Canada (Canadian Hot 100)	98
France (SNEP)	193
UK Singles (Official Charts Company)	135
US Billboard Hot 100	32
US Hot R&B/Hip-Hop Songs (Billboard)	7
US Rap Songs (Billboard)	4
US Rhythmic (Billboard)	12

== Certifications ==
Region	Certification	Certified units/sales
Australia (ARIA)	3× Platinum	210,000^{‡}
Brazil (Pro-Música Brasil)	Gold	30,000^{‡}
Canada (Music Canada)	Platinum	80,000^{*}
United Kingdom (BPI)	Platinum	600,000^{‡}
United States (RIAA)	8× Platinum	8,000,000^{‡}
^{*} Sales figures based on certification alone.^{‡} Sales+streaming figures based on certification alone.

== Release history ==
Country	Date	Format	Label
United States	February 6, 2013	Digital download	Aspire; Young Money; Cash Money; Republic
United States	February 12, 2013	Urban radio	Aspire; Young Money; Cash Money; Republic
United States	April 9, 2013	Mainstream radio	Aspire; Young Money; Cash Money; Republic

== In popular culture ==
The song was used in the NBA 2K14 soundtrack, as well as in the official trailer of the film Shazam! Fury of the Gods.
