= Levels (Meek Mill song) =

Single by Meek Mill

from the album Self Made Vol. 3
- Released: July 2, 2013
- Recorded: 2013
- Genre: Hip hop
- Length: 4:00
- Label: Dream Chasers; 215 Aphillyated; Maybach; Atlantic
- Songwriters: Robert Williams; Ronald LaTour; Lamont Dozier; Brock F Korsan
- Producer: Cardo

Meek Mill singles chronology
"Believe It" (2013)	"Levels" (2013)	"They Don't Love You No More" (2014)

"Levels" is a song by American rapper Meek Mill, released on July 2, 2013 as the lead single from the Maybach Music Group compilation album, Self Made Vol. 3. The song has since peaked at number 15 on the US Billboard Bubbling Under Hot 100 Singles chart.

== Reception ==
Rob Markman from MTV noted the song's personal content, describing it as what "is focused on upward mobility," and claimed that "Meek thumbs his nose at lower-tier rappers."

== Music video ==
The music video premiered on August 13, 2013, on WorldStarHipHop and was directed by Hype Williams. Fellow American rappers T.I., Rick Ross and Big Sean appear in the video, along with DJ Drama.

== Track listing ==
Digital single

No.	Title	Writer(s)	Producer(s)	Length
1.	"Levels"	Robert Williams; Ronald La Tour	Cardo	4:00

== Charts ==
=== Weekly charts ===
Chart (2013)	Peak position
US Bubbling Under Hot 100 (Billboard)	15
US Hot R&B/Hip-Hop Songs (Billboard)	43

== Certifications ==
Region	Certification	Certified units/sales
United States (RIAA)	Gold	500,000^{‡}
^{‡} Sales+streaming figures based on certification alone.

== Release history ==
Country	Date	Format	Label	Ref.
United States	July 2, 2013	Digital download	Dream Chasers Records, Maybach Music Group, Atlantic	
