= Moosh and Twist =

American hip hop group

Moosh & Twist.
- Also known as: Moosh & Twist
- Origin: Philadelphia, Pennsylvania, United States
- Genres: Hip hop
- Years active: 2011–present
- Label: eOne Music
- Members: Moosh; Twist
- Website: www.mooshandtwist.com

Moosh & Twist is an American hip hop duo from Philadelphia, Pennsylvania. The group consists of "Moosh" B. and Oliver "Twist" F. They have amassed a devoted following over the years and have released four official mixtapes and four EPs, the latest being their 2021 EP Forever Kids 2: Don't Get Trapped.

== History ==
=== 2000-2010: Beginnings ===
Moosh & Twist grew up in Philadelphia, Pennsylvania and attended The Philadelphia School together. The two became friends in first grade and bonded over their love of sports and music. Moosh & Twist would play drums and piano together in school. One of their grade school principals taught them the basics of recording when they were young and they playfully refer to him as their first engineer. They started rapping and making music together in 7th grade but didn't take it seriously until about 2009 when they were in 10th grade. The two attended different high schools, Haverford High School and Friends Select School, but remained friends. The pair officially came together under the title OCD: Moosh and Twist. They chose to include "OCD" in their moniker because they were obsessed with music. They have since dropped the prefix.

=== 2011–13: Various mixtapes ===
On March 7, 2011, while still in high school, Moosh & Twist released their first official mixtape Up Before the World. They released a few music videos on YouTube but the one that took off the fastest was for "City Kids." The video was directed by Rex Arrow, who was widely known for working with Mac Miller. In June 2011, Moosh & Twist were featured in XXL's section The Break. On September 25, 2011, Moosh and Twist released their second mixtape The Welcome Mat.

To follow up The Welcome Mat, the Philly duo released The Vestibule on January 3, 2012. The title of the mixtape derives from one of Moosh's rap lines from their previous mixtape. Twist explained, "We had this song called "Black Forest Gummy Worms" on Up Before The World and there's a line Moosh says, 'Standing at the door while they be sitting in the vestibule,' so the first project was called The Welcome Mat. You get to the door. We're about to graduate high school. We're knocking on the door, wiping our feet off. [Then] we get inside, and now we're standing in the vestibule and we think we're in a stage where [we're] in between. We want to break out huge so bad, but we still have to get our mindset right – get everything straight [and get] a little bit more mature – and The Vestibule is kind of like saying, 'We're so close but we're not inside.'" After high school graduation, the two chose to put college to the side and pursue music full-time.

Following The Vestibule, Moosh & Twist released Back to the Basement, their fourth mixtape, on March 12, 2013. The project featured production from producers such as DK and Logic's in-house producer 6ix. In October 2013, the duo went on the Party With Your Friends Tour with Hoodie Allen.

=== 2014-2015: Living Out Loud and touring ===
On April 22, 2014, Moosh & Twist released Living Out Loud on iTunes. The 7-song EP reached the top five on the iTunes hip-hop chart and number one on Billboard’s Heatseekers list. In the spring of 2014, the group went on the 21-city Living Out Loud Tour along with Jared Evan in support of the EP. On October 19, Moosh and Twist performed at the Forbes Under 30 Music Festival. In winter 2014, the Philly duo toured overseas in Europe for the first time. In early 2015, almost one year after the release of Living Out Loud, Moosh & Twist went on the Patiently Waiting Tour. Fresh off of the Patiently Waiting Tour, Moosh & Twist performed at South by Southwest in Austin, Texas for the first time. On July 3, 2015, Moosh & Twist made their way back to Europe for Wireless Festival.

Moosh & Twist enjoy performing and providing fans with a positive space to be. "We're just performing and letting people know that everything is okay for 45 minutes," says Twist. In early 2016, the duo toured with rapper Mike Stud on the Back 2 You Tour.

=== 2015-present: Growing Pains ===
On September 16, 2015, Moosh & Twist released "Whoa," the first single from their upcoming project Growing Pains. The second single from the project "Champion" was released on March 26, 2016. The duo did not announce the title of the project until they released their third single "Stamina" on April 26, 2016. "Stamina" features fellow Philadelphia native Lil Uzi Vert. On June 23, 2016, they announced "Growing Pains" would be released on August 5, 2016, and revealed the cover artwork. Moosh and Twist released a fourth single titled "Bring Me Some" on July 28, 2016. They released the EP "Wings" in August, 2017.

== Musical style ==
The individual styles of Moosh & Twist complement each other very well. Moosh is described as the pure spitter with a more laid back and technical flow while Twist's vocal tone and frenetic delivery brings the adrenaline. Moosh says that Twist brings enthusiasm and charisma and that they "attack the track differently." Twist says that Moosh writes the best hooks and is great with lyrics.

== Influences ==
Moosh & Twist name Black Thought of The Roots as a mentor. They look up to Philadelphia artists like The Roots, Meek Mill, and Will Smith. Moosh & Twist also list hip hop artists such as Lil Wayne, Drake, Kendrick Lamar, and Outkast as musical influences.

== Discography ==
=== Albums ===
Albums by Moosh & Twist
Year	Album title	Release details
2016	Growing Pains	Released: August 4, 2016; Format: CD and Digital download
2018	Crash	Released: January 19, 2018; Format: CD and Digital download

=== Extended plays ===
EPs by Moosh & Twist
Year	Album title	Release details
2014	Living Out Loud	Released: April 22, 2014; Format: Digital download
2020	Forever Kids	Released: 2020; Format: Digital download
2021	Forever Kids 2: Don't Get Trapped	Released: January 14, 2021; Format: Digital download

=== Mixtapes ===
List of mixtapes and album details
Title	Mixtape details
Up Before the World	Released: March 7, 2011; Formats: Digital download
The Welcome Mat	Released: September 25, 2011; Formats: Digital download
The Vestibule	Released: January 3, 2012; Formats: Digital download
Back to the Basement	Released: March 12, 2013; Formats: Digital download
