= List of UK Dance Singles Chart number ones of 2008 =

These are the Official Charts Company's UK Dance Chart number one hits of 2008. The dates listed in the menus below represent the Saturday after the Sunday the chart was announced, as per the way the dates are given in chart publications such as the ones produced by Billboard, Guinness, and Virgin.

== Chart history ==
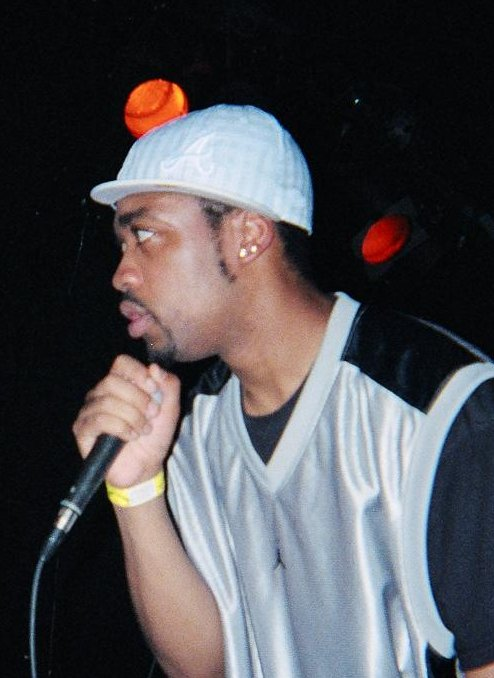
Rapper Wiley topped the dance chart for ten weeks with his track "Wearing My Rolex".

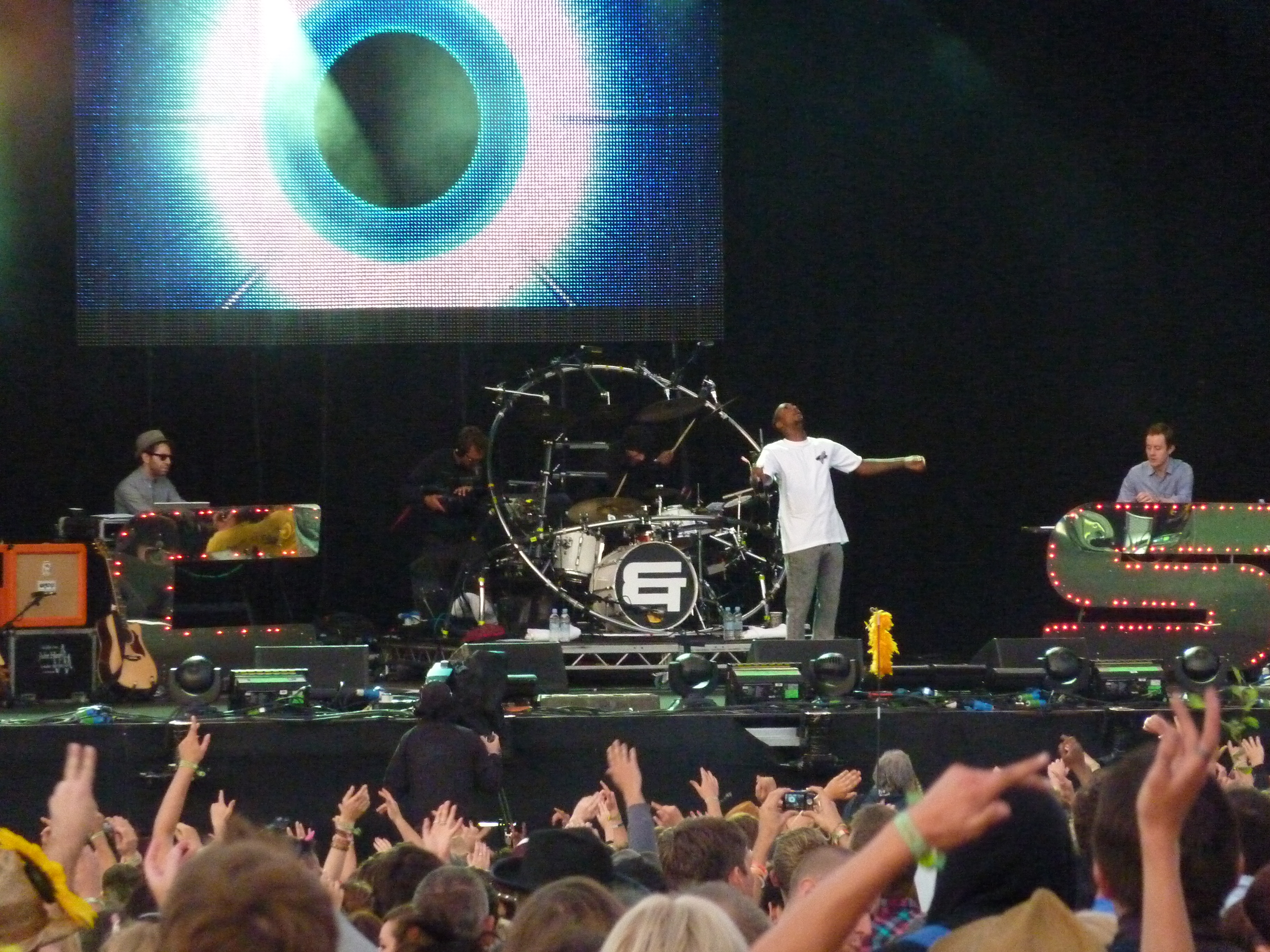
British duo Chase & Status were the only act to top the UK Dance Chart twice during 2008.

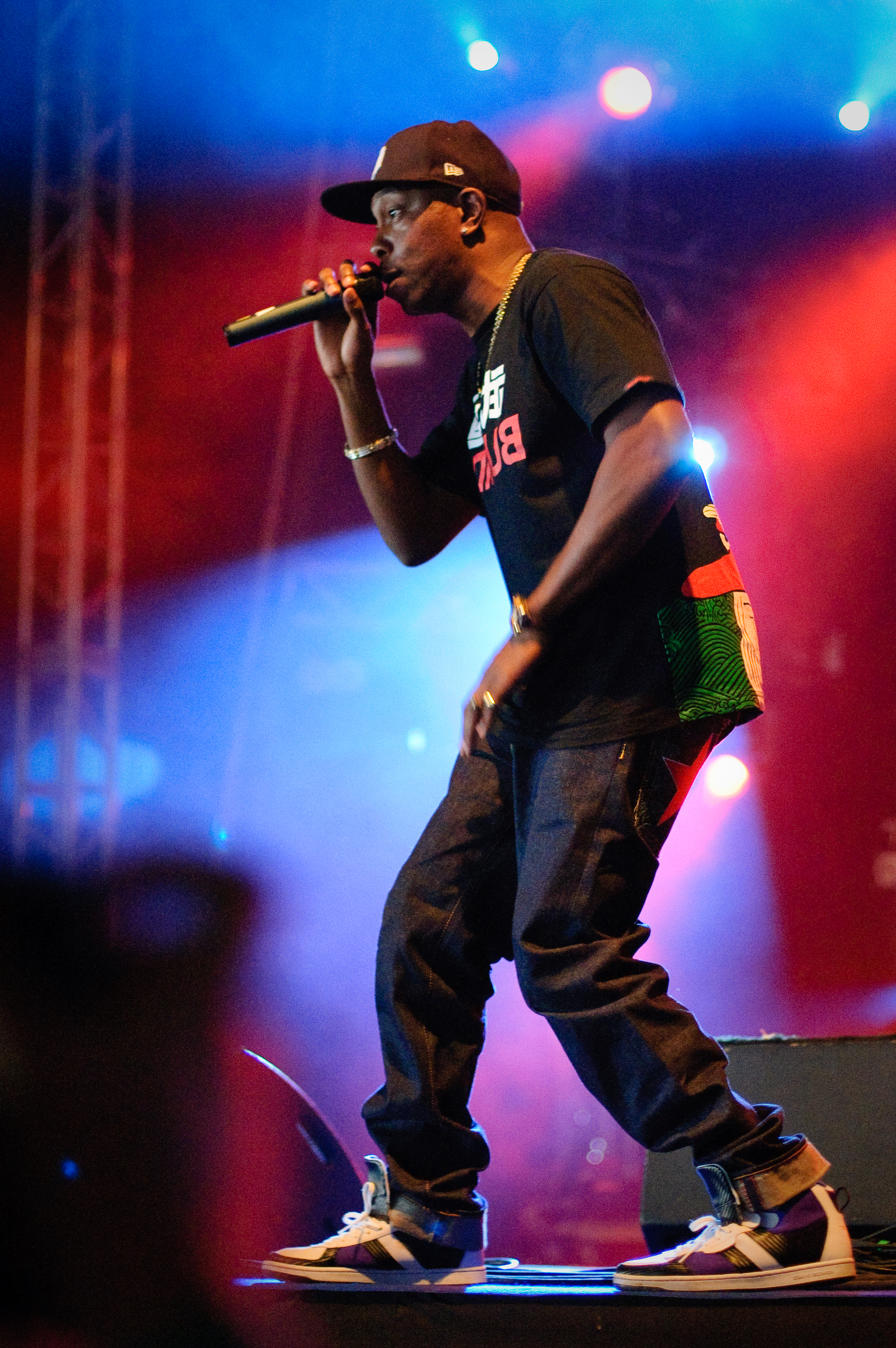
Dizzee Rascal had one of the biggest-selling dance hits of 2008 with "Dance Wiv Me".

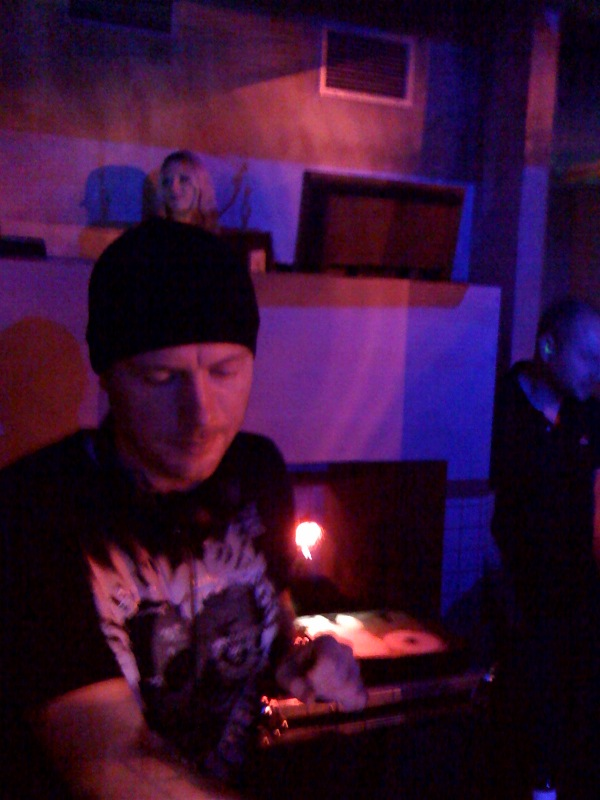
Eric Prydz's single "Pjanoo" was at number-one for nine weeks during 2008.

Issue date	Song	Artist(s)	Record label	Ref.
5 January	"Heartbroken"	T2 featuring Jodie Aysha	2NV/AATW/MNB	
12 January	"Heartbroken"	T2 featuring Jodie Aysha	2NV/AATW/MNB	
19 January	"Love Has Gone"	Dave Armstrong and Redroche	Hed Kandi	
26 January	"Heartbroken"	T2 featuring Jodie Aysha	2NV/AATW/MNB	
2 February	"What Planet You On?"	Bodyrox featuring Luciana	Island	
9 February	"Heartbroken"	T2 featuring Jodie Aysha	2NV/AATW/MNB	
16 February	"Now You're Gone"	Basshunter	Hard2Beat	
23 February	"Heartbroken"	T2 featuring Jodie Aysha	2NV/AATW/MNB	
1 March	"What's It Gonna Be"	H "Two" O featuring Platnum	Hard2Beat	
8 March	"Night"	Benga & Coki	Tempa	
15 March	"Blind"	Hercules and Love Affair	DFA/EMI	
22 March	"Night"	Benga & Coki	Tempa	
29 March	"Something Good '08"	Utah Saints	Data	
5 April	"Something Good '08"	Utah Saints	Data	
12 April	"Something Good '08"	Utah Saints	Data	
19 April	"Beeper"	The Count & Sinden featuring Kid Sister	Domino	
26 April	"Machine Gun"	Portishead	Island	
3 May	"Toca's Miracle 2008"	Fragma	Positiva	
10 May	"Toca's Miracle 2008"	Fragma	Positiva	
17 May	"Wearing My Rolex"	Wiley	Asylum	
24 May	"Wearing My Rolex"	Wiley	Asylum	
31 May	"Wearing My Rolex"	Wiley	Asylum	
7 June	"Wearing My Rolex"	Wiley	Asylum	
14 June	"Wearing My Rolex"	Wiley	Asylum	
21 June	"Wearing My Rolex"	Wiley	Asylum	
28 June	"Timewarp" / "Join The Dots"	Sub Focus	RAM	
5 July	"Wearing My Rolex"	Wiley	Asylum	
12 July	"Wearing My Rolex"	Wiley	Asylum	
19 July	"Dance Wiv Me"	Dizzee Rascal and Calvin Harris	Dirtee Stank	
26 July	"Dance Wiv Me"	Dizzee Rascal and Calvin Harris	Dirtee Stank	
2 August	"Dance Wiv Me"	Dizzee Rascal and Calvin Harris	Dirtee Stank	
9 August	"Take Me Away" / "Judgement (Informer)"	Chase & Status	RAM	
16 August	"Wearing My Rolex"	Wiley	Asylum	
23 August	"Wearing My Rolex"	Wiley	Asylum	
30 August	"Dance Wiv Me"	Dizzee Rascal and Calvin Harris	Dirtee Stank	
6 September	"Dance Wiv Me"	Dizzee Rascal and Calvin Harris	Dirtee Stank	
13 September	"Pjanoo"	Eric Prydz	Data	
20 September	"Pjanoo"	Eric Prydz	Data	
27 September	"Pjanoo"	Eric Prydz	Data	
4 October	"Pjanoo"	Eric Prydz	Data	
11 October	"Pieces"	Chase & Status featuring Plan B	RAM	
18 October	"Pieces"	Chase & Status featuring Plan B	RAM	
25 October	"Pieces"	Chase & Status featuring Plan B	RAM	
1 November	"Pieces"	Chase & Status featuring Plan B	RAM	
8 November	"Pjanoo"	Eric Prydz	Data	
15 November	"I'm in Love with a German Film Star"	Sam Taylor-Wood	Kompakt	
22 November	"Tear You Down" / "Drifter"	Brookes Brothers	Breakbeat Kaos	
29 November	"Tear You Down" / "Drifter"	Brookes Brothers	Breakbeat Kaos	
6 December	"Pieces"	Chase & Status featuring Plan B	RAM	
13 December	"Pjanoo"	Eric Prydz	Data	
20 December	"Pjanoo"	Eric Prydz	Data	
27 December	"Pjanoo"	Eric Prydz	Data	

== See also ==
- List of number-one singles of 2008 (UK)
- List of UK Indie Chart number-one singles of 2008
- List of UK Rock Chart number-one singles of 2008
- List of UK R&B Chart number-one singles of 2008
- List of UK Dance Albums Chart number ones of 2008
