= Grateful (DJ Khaled album) =

Studio album by DJ Khaled
- Released: June 23, 2017
- Recorded: 2016–2017
- Studio: We the Best Studios (Miami, Florida)
- Genre: Pop rap
- Length: 87:25
- Labels: We the Best; Epic
- Producers: Asahd Tuck Khaled (exec.); 808-Ray; Ben Billions; Calvin Harris; Carter Lang; Chance the Rapper; Cool & Dre; Danja; DannyBoyStyles; DaviDior; DJ Durel; DJ Khaled; DJ Nasty & LVM; Eli on the Beats; Francis and the Lights; JayO; Kuk Harrell; Lee on the Beats; Metro Boomin; Nate Fox; Nic Nac; Peter Cottontale; Quavo; Schife Karbeen; Southside; StreetRunner; Tarik Azzouz; The Beat Bully; Troyton Music

DJ Khaled chronology
Major Key (2016)	Grateful (2017)	Father of Asahd (2019)

Physical edition cover

Singles from Grateful
- 1. "Shining" Released: February 12, 2017; 2. "I'm the One" Released: April 28, 2017; 3. "Wild Thoughts" Released: June 16, 2017

Grateful is the tenth studio album by American disc jockey and record producer DJ Khaled. It was released as a double album on June 23, 2017, by We the Best Music Group and Epic Records. The album features guest appearances from Sizzla, Beyoncé, Jay-Z, Drake, Rihanna, Bryson Tiller, Justin Bieber, Quavo, Chance the Rapper, Lil Wayne, Travis Scott, Rick Ross, Big Sean, Nas, Betty Wright, Alicia Keys, Nicki Minaj, Jeremih, Future, PartyNextDoor, Kodak Black, Pusha T, Jadakiss, Fat Joe, Raekwon, Gucci Mane, Yo Gotti, 21 Savage, T.I., Young Thug, 2 Chainz, Belly, and Mavado.

== Background ==
The cover art was released alongside the album's third single on June 5, 2017, and featured Khaled's son Asahd, who was born in October 2016. Asahd was also revealed to be acting as the album's executive producer, with his father taking to talk show Jimmy Kimmel Live! in March 2017 to explain the reasoning and process behind his son's position on the album, stating:

He is credited as executive producer, and his attorney has his points and royalties, everything. Listening to the songs, going over the business part of it, [deciding] if the vocals are right, if the beats are right, if the energy's right. When he [rocks and grins], those are smash hit records, when he [looks deep in thought], that's the real serious records but hits with substance. It's a vibe, you know what I mean? Believe it or not, the poops and the throw-ups are super blessings. Those are actually the real good ones. He actually threw up on me while I was mixing and working on "Shining", and when he threw up on me, that [was] a blessing.

=== Recording and production ===
The album also saw production from an array of producers, including several in-house producers from Khaled's We the Best Music Group record label. Cool & Dre and Nasty Beatmakers co-produced two of the album's singles, which were heavily influenced by the musical styles present in Miami. The former also contributed toward three additional songs on the album, teaming up with 808-Ray for each effort. Other in-house producers Danja and Lee on the Beats additionally provided production, with Khaled enlisting the duo on several occasions prior for his previous albums. Khaled later worked with Scottish producer and disc jockey Calvin Harris, who also received a co-artist credit for "Don't Quit". The album was also comprised by several other record producers such as Nic Nac, Ben Billions, DannyBoyStyles, The Beat Bully, Schife, StreetRunner and Tarik Azzouz, among others.

== Singles ==
The album's lead single, "Shining", was released on February 12, 2017. It features guest vocals from American singer Beyoncé, and American rapper Jay-Z, with production by Khaled himself, and Danja; as well as it was also co-written by Canadian singer PartyNextDoor. It premiered following the 59th Annual Grammy Awards, peaking at number 57 on the US Billboard Hot 100.

"I'm the One" was released as the album's second single on April 28, 2017. The song features guest appearances from Canadian singer Justin Bieber, alongside American rappers Quavo, Chance the Rapper, and Lil Wayne. It also saw production from Khaled himself, as well as being co-produced by Nic Nac. "I'm the One" debuted at number one, becoming Khaled's first number one single on the US Billboard Hot 100; as well as also topping the charts in the United Kingdom, Australia and Canada.

"Wild Thoughts" was released as the album's third single on June 16, 2017. The song features guest appearances from Barbadian singer Rihanna, and American singer Bryson Tiller, with production by Khaled himself, and Nasty Beatmakers as well as it was also co-written by Canadian singer PartyNextDoor. Khaled has previously collaborated with Tiller on Major Key, however, the single marks his first collaboration with Rihanna. Khaled described his attempts to court Rihanna for a feature appearance on an album for several years in an interview with Entertainment Weekly, stating "seven, eight years I've been trying to do this. I always put the kites out there that I wanted to work with her [and] I was always getting the right record ready [to] see if something comes back that's possible." The single housed elements of Latin pop and contemporary R&B, debuting at number four on the US Billboard Hot 100, peaking at number two.

=== Promotional singles ===
The promotional single from the album, "To the Max", was released on June 5, 2017. The single features guest appearances from Canadian rapper Drake, with production by Khaled himself and JayO. The song marked the fifth collaboration between the pair, and contained sampling from an array of musical genres, including bassline and alternative rock. "To the Max" peaked at number 53 on the US Billboard Hot 100.

== Critical reception ==
Professional ratings
Aggregate scores
Source	Rating
Metacritic	61/100
Review scores
Source	Rating
AllMusic	2.5/5 stars
Entertainment Weekly	B
Exclaim!	4/10
The Guardian	3/5 stars
Pitchfork	5.2/10

At Metacritic, which assigns a normalized rating out of 100 to reviews from critics, Grateful received an average score of 61, based on 11 reviews, indicating "generally favorable" reception.

== Commercial performance ==
Grateful is Khaled's highest career first week sales to date. It debuted at number one on the US Billboard 200, with 149,000 album-equivalent units, of which 50,000 were pure album sales. It is DJ Khaled's second number-one album on the chart. On July 14, 2017, Grateful was certified gold by the Recording Industry Association of America for combined sales and album-equivalent units of over 500,000 units in the United States. On August 23, 2017, the album was certified platinum by the Recording Industry Association of America (RIAA) for combined sales and album-equivalent units of over 1,000,000 domestic units. January 23, 2022, the album was certified double platinum by the Recording Industry Association of America (RIAA) for combined sales and album-equivalent units of over 2,000,000 domestic units, making it DJ Khaled's best-selling album.

== Track listing ==
Credits adapted from Tidal.

Disc one
No.	Title	Writer(s)	Producer(s)	Length
1.	"(Intro) I'm So Grateful" (featuring Sizzla)	Khaled Khaled; Miguel Collins; Nathaniel Hills	DJ Khaled; Danja^{[a]}	4:58
2.	"Shining" (featuring Beyoncé and Jay-Z)	K. Khaled; Beyoncé Knowles; Shawn Carter; Jahron Brathwaite; Burt Bacharach; Hal David; Ingrid Burley; Hills	DJ Khaled; Danja^{[a]}	4:44
3.	"To the Max" (featuring Drake)	K. Khaled; Aubrey Graham; Teairra Mari; Jodie Aysha; Joshua Joseph; Eamon Doyle; Kirk Robinson; Yared Williams; Selassie Ward	JayO	3:13
4.	"Wild Thoughts" (featuring Rihanna and Bryson Tiller)	K. Khaled; Robyn Fenty; Bryson Tiller; Brathwaite; Jerry Duplessis; Wyclef Jean; David McRae; Lynden Brown; Marvin Moore-Hough; Carlos Santana	DJ Khaled	3:24
5.	"I'm the One" (featuring Justin Bieber, Quavo, Chance the Rapper, and Lil Wayne)	K. Khaled; Justin Bieber; Quavious Marshall; Chancelor Bennett; Dwayne Carter, Jr.; Nicholas Balding; Jason Boyd; Bobby Brackins; David Park; Ray Jacobs	DJ Khaled; Nic Nac; DaviDior^{[b]}	4:48
6.	"On Everything" (featuring Travis Scott, Rick Ross, and Big Sean)	K. Khaled; Jacques Webster II; William Roberts II; Sean Anderson; Andre Lyon; Mark Pritchard; Hills	DJ Khaled; Danja^{[a]}	3:53
7.	"It's Secured" (featuring Nas and Travis Scott)	K. Khaled; Nasir Jones; Webster; Lyon; Bradley Brown; Collins; Bobby Dixon; Paul Henton; Dave Richards; Rayshawn Cobbs, Jr.	DJ Khaled; 808-Ray^{[a]}	3:39
8.	"Interlude (Hallelujah)" (performed by Betty Wright)	K. Khaled; Betty Wright; Lyon		0:52
9.	"Nobody" (featuring Alicia Keys and Nicki Minaj)	K. Khaled; Alicia Cook; Onika Maraj; Marcello Valenzano; Lyon; Cobbs, Jr.; Thomas Lee Barrett	DJ Khaled; Cool & Dre; 808-Ray	4:31
10.	"I Love You So Much" (featuring Chance the Rapper)	K. Khaled; Bennett; Peter Wilkins; Nate Fox; Carter Lang; Francis Starlite; Matthew Brownie; Marvin Sapp; Berry Gordy; Alphonso Mizell; Frederick Perren; Deke Richards	Francis and the Lights; Fox; Peter Cottontale; Lang; Chance the Rapper	4:50
11.	"Don't Quit" (with Calvin Harris featuring Travis Scott and Jeremih)	K. Khaled; Adam Wiles; Webster; Jeremy Felton; Brittany Hazzard	Calvin Harris	3:49

Disc two
No.	Title	Writer(s)	Producer(s)	Length
12.	"I Can't Even Lie" (featuring Future and Nicki Minaj)	K. Khaled; Nayvadius Wilburn; Maraj; Hills	DJ Khaled; Danja^{[a]}	4:01
13.	"Down for Life" (featuring PartyNextDoor, Future, Travis Scott, Rick Ross, and Kodak Black)	K. Khaled; Brathwaite; Wilburn; Webster; Roberts; Bill Kapri; Lyon; Kevin Cossom; Anthony Norris	DJ Khaled; Lee on the Beats	5:00
14.	"Major Bag Alert" (featuring Migos)	K. Khaled; Marshall; Kirshnik Ball; Kiari Cephus; Daryl McPherson	DJ Durel; Quavo^{[a]}	4:57
15.	"Good Man" (featuring Pusha T and Jadakiss)	K. Khaled; Terrence Thornton; Jason Phillips; Willie Clarke; Clarence Reid; Cobbs	DJ Khaled; 808-Ray	3:38
16.	"Billy Ocean" (featuring Fat Joe and Raekwon)	K. Khaled; Joseph Cartagena; Corey Woods; Lyon; Ernie Isley; Marvin Isley; O'Kelly Isley; Ronald Isley; Rudolph Isley; Chris Jasper; J. Mollings; L. Mollings	DJ Khaled; Nasty Beatmakers^{[a]}	3:11
17.	"Pull a Caper" (featuring Kodak Black, Gucci Mane, and Rick Ross)	K. Khaled; Kapri; Radric Davis; Roberts; Benjamin Diehl; Danny Schofield	Ben Billions; DannyBoyStyles	4:06
18.	"That Range Rover Came with Steps" (featuring Future and Yo Gotti)	K. Khaled; Wilburn; Mario Mims; Anthony Tucker; Maurice Jordan	The Beat Bully; DJ Khaled^{[a]}	4:16
19.	"Iced Out My Arms" (featuring Future, Migos, 21 Savage, and T.I.)	K. Khaled; Wilburn; Marshall; Ball; Cephus; Shayaa Bin Abraham-Joseph; Clifford Harris, Jr.; Leland Wayne; Joshua Luellen	Metro Boomin; Southside	4:35
20.	"Whatever" (featuring Future, Young Thug, Rick Ross, and 2 Chainz)	K. Khaled; Wilburn; Jeffery Williams; Roberts; Tauheed Epps; Arthur Baker; John Robie; Ian Lewis; Eliphete Celestin; Diehl	Ben Billions; Schife Karbeen; Eli on the Beats; DJ Khaled^{[a]}	4:59
21.	"Interlude" (performed by Belly)	K. Khaled; Ahmad Balshe; Pam Sawyer; Clay McMurray; John Glover; Nicholas Warwar	StreetRunner; Tarik Azzouz^{[b]}	2:18
22.	"Unchanging Love" (performed by Mavado)	K. Khaled; David Brooks; Troy Hinds; Michael Fairman; Alex Bagwandeen	Troyton Music	3:27
23.	"Asahd Talk (Thank You Asahd)" (performed by Asahd Khaled)	K. Khaled; Asahd Khaled		0:16
Total length:				87:25

Japanese bonus tracks
No.	Title	Writer(s)	Producer(s)	Length
23.	"Wild Thoughts (Medasin Dance Remix)" (featuring Rihanna and Bryson Tiller)	K. Khaled; Fenty; Tiller; J. Mollings; L. Mollings; Braithwaite; Duplessis; Jean; McRae; L. Brown; Moore-Hough; Santana	Medasin	4:35
24.	"Wild Thoughts (NOTD Dance Remix)" (featuring Rihanna and Bryson Tiller)	K. Khaled; Fenty; Tiller; J. Mollings; L. Mollings; Braithwaite; Duplessis; Jean; McRae; L. Brown; Moore-Hough; Santana	Tobias Danielsson; Samuel Brandt	3:09
Total length:				92:03

Notes

- ^{^[a]} signifies a co-producer
- ^{^[b]} signifies an additional producer
- ^{^[c]} signifies a vocal producer
- "Wild Thoughts" features background vocals from PartyNextDoor
- "I Love You So Much" features background vocals from Lisa Mishra, Jabari Rayford, Teddy Jackson, Jamila Woods, Dariu and Carter Lang
- "To the Max" was not included on streaming versions of the album internationally; thus the track listing was cut down to 22 songs

Sample credits

- "Shining" contains a sample of "Dionne", performed by Osunlade, which itself samples "Walk the Way You Talk", performed by Dionne Warwick.
- "To the Max" contains samples from the "Get It Right" Challenge hosted by Major Nine, "Lit", performed by 1WayFrank, and "Heartbroken", performed by T2.
- "Wild Thoughts" contains a sample of "Maria Maria", performed by Santana.
- "On Everything" contains a sample of "Under the Sun", performed by Mark Pritchard.
- "It's Secured" contains a sample of "Woman I Need You", performed by Sizzla.
- "Nobody" contains a sample of "Nobody Knows", performed by Pastor T.L. Barrett.
- "I Love You so Much" contains samples from "Never Could Have Made It", performed by Marvin Sapp, and "ABC", performed by The Jackson 5.
- "Good Man" contains a sample of "Am I A Good Man", performed by Them Two.
- "Billy Ocean" contains a sample of "Ballad for the Fallen Soldier", performed by The Isley Brothers.
- "Pull a Caper" contains a sample of "Against All Odds (Take A Look At Me Now)", performed by Phil Collins.
- "Whatever" contains interpolations of "Play at Your Own Risk", performed by Planet Patrol.
- "Interlude" contains a sample of "A Man Without Love", performed by The Originals.

== Personnel ==
Credits adapted from the liner notes of Grateful.

※() is the track list of the album from CD.

=== Artists/Vocals ===
- DJ Khaled – primary artist (tracks 1–7(6), 9(8)–20(19))
- Sizzla – featured artist (track 1)
- Beyoncé – featured artist (track 2)
- Jay-Z – featured artist (track 2)
- Drake – featured artist (track 3)※Not included on the album.
- Rihanna – featured artist (track 4(3))
- Bryson Tiller – featured artist (track 4(3))
- Justin Bieber – featured artist (track 5(4))
- Quavo – featured artist (track 5(4))
- Chance the Rapper – featured artist (tracks 5(4) and 10(9))
- Lil Wayne – featured artist (track 5(4))
- Travis Scott – featured artist (tracks 6(5), 7(6), 11(10), 13(12))
- Rick Ross – featured artist (tracks 6(5), 13(12), 17(16), 20(19))
- Big Sean – featured artist (track 6(5))
- Nas – featured artist (track 7(6))
- Betty Wright – featured artist (track 8(7))
- Alicia Keys – featured artist (track 9(8))
- Nicki Minaj – featured artist (tracks 9(8), 12(11))
- Calvin Harris – featured artist (track 10(9))
- Jeremih – featured artist (track 10(9))
- Future – featured artist (tracks 12(11)–13(12), 18(17)–20(19))
- PARTYNEXTDOOR – featured artist (track 13(12))
- Kodak Black – featured artist (tracks 13(12), 17(16))
- Migos – featured artist (tracks 14(13), 19(18))
- Pusha T – featured artist (track 15(14))
- Jadakiss – featured artist (track 15(14))
- Fat Joe – featured artist (track 16(15))
- Raekwon – featured artist (track 16(15))
- Gucci Mane – featured artist (track 17(16))
- Yo Gotti – featured artist (track 18(17))
- 21 Savage – featured artist (track 19(18))
- T.I. – featured artist (track 19(18))
- Young Thug – featured artist (track 20(19))
- 2 Chainz – featured artist (track 20(19))
- Belly – featured artist (track 21(20))
- Mavado – featured artist (track 22(21))
- Asahd khaled – featured artist (track 23(22))
- Lisa Mishra – background vocals (track 10(9))
- Jabari Rayford – background vocals (track 10(9))
- Teddy Jackson – background vocals (track 10(9))
- Jamila Woods – background vocals (track 10(9))
- Dariu – background vocals (track 10(9))
- Carter Lang – background vocals (track 10(9))

=== Instrumentation ===
- Eddie Montilla – keys (track 17(16))

=== Technical ===
- Juan "Wize" Pena – recording (tracks 1–21(20))
- Lu Diaz – mixing (tracks 1–2, 6(5)–12(11), 14(13)–21(20))
- Ben "Billions" Diehl – recording (track 2)
- Todd Robinson – recording (track 2)
- Kuk Harrell – recording (track 4(3))
- Michael "Black Mic" Williams – recording (track 4(3))
- David "Prep" Hughes – recording (tracks 4(3), 13(12))
- Manny Marroquin – mixing (tracks 4(3)–5(4), 13(12))
- Chris Galland – mixing assistance (tracks 4(3)–5(4), 13(12))
- Jeff Lane – recording (tracks 5(4), 10(9))
- Manny Galvez – recording (track 5(4))
- Jeff Edwards – recording (track 5(4))
- Thomas "Tomcat" Bennett – recording (tracks 6(5), 13(12), 17(16), 20(19))
- Gregg Rominiecki – recording (track 6(5))
- Ray Alamo – assistant engineer (tracks 6(5)–7(6), 9(8)–12(11), 14(13)–20(19))
- Derrick Jenner – assistant engineer (tracks 6(5)–7(6), 9(8)–12(11), 15(14)–20(19))
- Mark "Exit" Goodchild – recording (track 7(6))
- Blake Harden – recording (tracks 7(6), 11(10), 13(12))
- Victor Pereyra – assistant engineer (track 7(6))
- Terrence Rolle – assistant engineer (tracks 8(7), 15(14), 19(18))
- Joe Zarrillo – recording (track 9(8))
- Aubry "Big Juice" Delaine – recording (tracks 9(8), 12(11))
- Jamal Berry – assistant engineer (track 9(8))
- Nick Valentin – assistant engineer (track 9(8))
- Ann Mincieli – engineering & recording for Alicia Keys (track 9(8))
- Ashwin Towke – assistant engineer (track 10(9))
- Mason Bonner – assistant engineer (track 10(9))
- Noe Ramirez – assistant engineer (track 10(9))
- Eric Manco – recording (tracks 12(11)–13(12), 18(17)–20(19))
- Iain Findlay – assistant engineer (track 12(11))
- Alexander "Smitty Beats" Smith – recording (track 16(15))
- Salvador Majail – assistant engineer (track 16(15))
- Derek Garcia – recording (track 17(16))
- Shin Kamiyama – recording (track 21(20))
- Antho-ny Falzone – assistant engineer (track 21(20))
- Jermaine Reid – recording (track 22(21))
- Kamal Evans – mixing (track 22(21))

=== Production ===
- Asahd Khaled – executive production
- DJ Khaled – production (tracks 1–2, 4(3)–7(6), 9(8), 12(11)–13(12), 15(14)–16(15)), co-production (tracks 18(17), 20(19))
- Danja – co-production (tracks 1–2, 6(5), 12(11))
- Kuk Harrell – vocal production (track 4(3))
- Nasty Beatmakers – co-production (tracks 4(3), 16(15))
- LetMeSeeYou – production (track 5(4))
- David "DaviDior" Park – additional production (track 5(4))
- 808-Ray – co-production (track 7(6)), production (tracks 9(8), 15(14))
- Cool & Dre – production (track 9(8))
- Chance the Rapper – production (track 10(9))
- Peter CottonTale – production (track 10(9))
- Nate Fox – production (track 10(9))
- Carter Lang – production (track 10(9))
- Francis Starlite – production (track 10(9))
- Calvin Harris – production (track 11(10))
- Lee on the Beats – production (track 13(12))
- DJ Durel – production (track 14(13))
- Ben Billions – production (tracks 17(16), 20(19))
- DannyBoyStyles – production (track 17(16))
- The Beat Bully – production (track 18(17))
- Metro Boomin – production (track 19(18))
- Southside – production (track 19(18))
- Schife Karbeen – production (track 20(19))
- Eli on the Beat – production (track 20(19))
- STREETRUNNER – production (track 21(20))
- Tarik Azzouz – additional production (track 21(20))
- Troy "Troyton" Hinds – production (track 22(21))

=== Artwork ===
- Christopher Feldmann – art direction & design
- Jonathan Mannion – photography

== Charts ==
=== Weekly charts ===
Chart (2017)	Peak position
Australian Albums (ARIA)	7
Austrian Albums (Ö3 Austria)	30
Belgian Albums (Ultratop Flanders)	34
Belgian Albums (Ultratop Wallonia)	72
Canadian Albums (Billboard)	2
Czech Albums (ČNS IFPI)	54
Danish Albums (Hitlisten)	2
Dutch Albums (Album Top 100)	8
Finnish Albums (Suomen virallinen lista)	2
French Albums (SNEP)	10
German Albums (Offizielle Top 100)	35
Irish Albums (IRMA)	17
Italian Albums (FIMI)	13
Japanese Albums (Oricon)	58
New Zealand Albums (RMNZ)	15
Norwegian Albums (VG-lista)	1
Scottish Albums (Official Charts)	53
Slovak Albums (ČNS IFPI)	24
Swedish Albums (Sverigetopplistan)	5
Swiss Albums (Schweizer Hitparade)	20
UK Albums (Official Charts)	10
US Billboard 200	1
US Top R&B/Hip-Hop Albums (Billboard)	1

=== Year-end charts ===
Chart (2017)	Position
Canadian Albums (Billboard)	31
Danish Albums (Hitlisten)	24
French Albums (SNEP)	92
Swedish Albums (Sverigetopplistan)	38
US Billboard 200	31
US Top R&B/Hip-Hop Albums (Billboard)	14

Chart (2018)	Position
US Billboard 200	160

=== Decade-end charts ===
Chart (2010–2019)	Position
US Billboard 200	160

== Certifications ==
Region	Certification	Certified units/sales
Brazil (Pro-Música Brasil)	Platinum	40,000^{‡}
Canada (Music Canada)	Platinum	80,000^{‡}
Denmark (IFPI Danmark)	Platinum	20,000^{‡}
France (SNEP)	Gold	50,000^{‡}
Italy (FIMI)	Gold	25,000^{‡}
New Zealand (RMNZ)	Platinum	15,000^{‡}
Norway (IFPI Norway)	Gold	15,000^{‡}
Poland (ZPAV)	Gold	10,000^{‡}
Singapore (RIAS)	Gold	5,000^{*}
Switzerland (IFPI Switzerland)	Gold	10,000^{‡}
United States (RIAA)	2× Platinum	2,000,000^{‡}
^{*} Sales figures based on certification alone.^{‡} Sales+streaming figures based on certification alone.
