= List of top 10 singles in 2008 (Ireland) =

This is a list of singles that peaked in the Top 10 of the Irish Singles Chart during 2008 (see 2008 in Irish music).

- The "Top 10 Entry Date" is when the song entered the Top 10 for the first time.
- Songs that were still in the Top 10 at the beginning of 2008 but peaked in 2007 are provided in the 2007 Peaks segment at the bottom of the page.
- Songs that entered the Top 10 in 2008 but did not peak until 2009 are listed in List of top 10 singles in 2009 (Ireland).

== Top 10 singles ==
| Entry date | Single | Artist | Peak | Peak reached | Weeks | Ref. |
Singles from 2007
| 13 December | "Crank That (Soulja Boy)" | Soulja Boy Tellem | 3 | 3 January | 11 | |
| 20 December | "Piece of Me" | Britney Spears | 1 | 10 January | 15 | |
Singles from 2008
| 3 January | "Don't Stop the Music"^{[A]} | Rihanna | 6 | 7 February | 6 | |
| 10 January | "Now You're Gone" | Basshunter | 1 | 24 January | 14 | |
| 10 January | "Rockstar" | Nickelback | 2 | 31 January | 12 | |
| 10 January | "The Galway Girl"^{[C]} | Mundy & Sharon Shannon | 1 | 10 April | 12 | |
| 17 January | "Homecoming" | Kanye West featuring Chris Martin | 5 | 24 January | 5 | |
| 17 January | "Relax, Take It Easy" | Mika | 8 | 17 January | 5 | |
| 17 January | "Superstar" | Lupe Fiasco | 3 | 7 February | 7 | |
| 24 January | "Chasing Pavements" | Adele | 7 | 24 January | 4 | |
| 31 January | "Falling Slowly"^{[B]} | Glen Hansard & Markéta Irglová | 2 | 6 March | 5 | |
| 31 January | "Better" | Tom Baxter | 10 | 31 January | 2 | |
| 14 February | "Stop and Stare" | OneRepublic | 5 | 13 March | 7 | |
| 21 February | "Mercy" | Duffy | 1 | 28 February | 9 | |
| 21 February | "What's It Gonna Be?" | H "Two" O featuring Platnum | 6 | 28 February | 4 | |
| 21 February | "Wow" | Kylie Minogue | 10 | 21 February | 1 | |
| 28 February | "The Ballad of Ronnie Drew" | Various Artists | 1 | 6 March | 4 | |
| 28 February | "Ghost" | Luan Parle | 10 | 28 February | 1 | |
| 6 March | "Us Against the World" | Westlife | 6 | 6 March | 1 | |
| 6 March | "Low" | Flo Rida featuring T-Pain | 1 | 27 March | 17 | |
| 13 March | "Better in Time" | Leona Lewis | 4 | 20 March | 6 | |
| 13 March | "Scream" | Timbaland featuring Keri Hilson & Nicole Scherzinger | 10 | 13 March | 1 | |
| 20 March | "American Boy" | Estelle featuring Kanye West | 2 | 20 March | 11 | |
| 27 March | "With You" | Chris Brown | 3 | 27 March | 7 | |
| 27 March | "4 Minutes" | Madonna featuring Justin Timberlake & Timbaland | 1 | 15 May | 7 | |
| 3 April | "The Munster Song" | Glen Keating & Greg Ryan | 1 | 3 April | 2 | |
| 3 April | "Break the Ice"^{[D]} | Britney Spears | 7 | 17 April | 2 | |
| 10 April | "Black and Gold" | Sam Sparro | 5 | 8 May | 11 | |
| 17 April | "Cry For You" | September | 8 | 17 April | 5 | |
| 24 April | "Ireland Douze Points"^{[E]} | Dustin the Turkey | 5 | 24 April | 4 | |
| 24 April | "Got Ur Number" | Amy | 9 | 24 April | 1 | |
| 24 April | "Love in This Club" | Usher | 3 | 29 May | 11 | |
| 1 May | "We Cry" | The Script | 9 | 1 May | 1 | |
| 8 May | "Heartbreaker" | will.i.am featuring Cheryl Cole | 7 | 29 May | 6 | |
| 15 May | "That's Not My Name" | The Ting Tings | 2 | 15 May | 12 | |
| 15 May | "Take a Bow" | Rihanna | 1 | 22 May | 10 | |
| 29 May | "Forever" | Chris Brown | 1 | 19 June | 13 | |
| 5 June | "Singin' in the Rain" | Mint Royale | 3 | 12 June | 3 | |
| 5 June | "Love Song" | Sara Bareilles | 5 | 19 June | 5 | |
| 12 June | "Viva la Vida"^{[H]} | Coldplay | 3 | 19 June | 11 | |
| 19 June | "Jumping All Over the World" | Scooter | 10 | 19 June | 1 | |
| 26 June | "On Wings" | Leanne Moore | 1 | 26 June | 1 | |
| 26 June | "Closer" | Ne-Yo | 3 | 3 July | 7 | |
| 26 June | "No Air" | Jordin Sparks & Chris Brown | 2 | 10 July | 12 | |
| 3 July | "All I Ever Wanted" | Basshunter | 1 | 10 July | 9 | |
| 10 July | "All Summer Long" | Kid Rock | 1 | 24 July | 12 | |
| 10 July | "Dance wiv Me" | Dizzee Rascal featuring Calvin Harris & Chrome | 5 | 31 July | 11 | |
| 10 July | "Stay with Me"^{[F]}^{[G]} | Ironik | 8 | 24 July | 3 | |
| 17 July | "Give It 2 Me" | Madonna | 10 | 17 July | 1 | |
| 24 July | "The Man Who Can't Be Moved | The Script | 2 | 28 August | 12 | |
| 31 July | "Livin' In the Summertime" | Keywest | 8 | 31 July | 1 | |
| 7 August | "I Kissed a Girl" | Katy Perry | 1 | 21 August | 10 | |
| 7 August | "Disturbia" | Rihanna | 4 | 14 August | 11 | |
| 14 August | "Love Is Noise" | The Verve | 7 | 14 August | 4 | |
| 28 August | "5 Years Time" | Noah and the Whale | 10 | 28 August | 1 | |
| 4 September | "Trust Me, I'm a Doctor" | The Blizzards | 2 | 4 September | 5 | |
| 4 September | "When I Grow Up" | The Pussycat Dolls | 2 | 11 September | 6 | |
| 4 September | "Pjanoo" | Eric Prydz | 7 | 4 September | 3 | |
| 11 September | "Sex on Fire" | Kings of Leon | 1 | 18 September | 10 | |
| 18 September | "Beggin'" | Madcon | 8 | 18 September | 2 | |
| 25 September | "Love Lockdown"^{[I]} | Kanye West | 4 | 13 November | 6 | |
| 25 September | "Miss Independent" | Ne-Yo | 9 | 25 September | 1 | |
| 2 October | "So What" | Pink | 1 | 2 October | 8 | |
| 2 October | "Live Your Life"^{[K]} | T.I. featuring Rihanna | 3 | 2 October | 9 | |
| 2 October | "Love You Anyway" | Boyzone | 3 | 9 October | 3 | |
| 2 October | "Angel in the Night" | Basshunter | 10 | 2 October | 2 | |
| 9 October | "In This City" | Iglu & Hartly | 9 | 9 October | 2 | |
| 16 October | "About You Now" | The Saw Doctors | 1 | 16 October | 4 | |
| 16 October | "Take Back the City" | Snow Patrol | 4 | 16 October | 3 | |
| 16 October | "Human"^{[O]} | The Killers | 4 | 20 November | 13 | |
| 16 October | "Don't Call This Love" | Leon Jackson | 8 | 16 October | 1 | |
| 23 October | "The Promise" | Girls Aloud | 2 | 30 October | 6 | |
| 23 October | "Forgive Me"^{[J]}^{[L]} | Leona Lewis | 5 | 23 October | 3 | |
| 23 October | "Hot n Cold"^{[O]} | Katy Perry | 3 | 13 November | 9 | |
| 30 October | "Hero" | The X-Factor Finalists 2008 | 1 | 30 October | 9 | |
| 6 November | "Womanizer"^{[M]} | Britney Spears | 2 | 6 November | 8 | |
| 6 November | "If I Were a Boy" | Beyoncé | 2 | 13 November | 12 | |
| 20 November | "Run" | Leona Lewis | 1 | 20 November | 9 | |
| 27 November | "Greatest Day" | Take That | 2 | 11 December | 7 | |
| 27 November | "I Hate This Part" | The Pussycat Dolls | 9 | 4 December | 3 | |
| 4 December | "Infinity 2008" | Guru Josh Project | 10 | 4 December | 1 | |
| 11 December | "Use Somebody" | Kings of Leon | 6 | 11 December | 10 | |
| 18 December | "Hallelujah" | Alexandra Burke | 1 | 18 December | 8 | |
| 18 December | "Where Did My Money Go?" | Pat Shortt | 2 | 25 December | 2 | |
| 18 December | "Fairytale of New York"^{[N]} | The Pogues featuring Kirsty MacColl | 8 | 18 December | 2 | |
| 18 December | "Hallelujah" | Jeff Buckley | 8 | 25 December | 2 | |

Notes:

- ^{A} - The single re-entered the Top 10 on 7 February 2008.
- ^{B} - The single re-entered the Top 10 on 28 February 2008.
- ^{C} - The single re-entered the Top 10 on 20 March 2008.
- ^{D} - The single re-entered the Top 10 on 17 April 2008.
- ^{E} - The single re-entered the Top 10 on 22 May 2008.
- ^{F} - The single re-entered the Top 10 on 24 July 2008.
- ^{G} - The single re-entered the Top 10 on 7 August 2008.
- ^{H} - The single re-entered the Top 10 on 14 August 2008.
- ^{I} - The single re-entered the Top 10 on 23 October 2008.
- ^{J} - The single re-entered the Top 10 on 6 November 2008.
- ^{K} - The single re-entered the Top 10 on 13 November 2008.
- ^{L} - The single re-entered the Top 10 on 20 November 2008.
- ^{M} - The single re-entered the top 10 on 27 November 2008.
- ^{N} - The single peaked at #1 in 1987.
- ^{O} - The singles re-entered the Top 10 on 1 January 2009.

== 2007 Peaks ==
- Leon Jackson - "When You Believe" (Peak #1, Weeks: 6)
- Timbaland featuring OneRepublic - "Apologize" (Peak #2, Weeks: 14)
- Leona Lewis - "Bleeding Love" (Peak: #1, Weeks: 12)
- Journey - "Don't Stop Believin'" (Peak #4, Weeks: 15)
- Shayne Ward - "Breathless" (Peak: #2, Weeks: 7)
- Take That - "Rule the World" (Peak: #3, Weeks: 10)
- Cascada - "What Hurts the Most" (Peak: #6, Weeks: 4)

== See also ==
- 2008 in Irish music
- List of number-one singles of 2008 (Ireland)
