= To the Max (song) =

Promotional single by DJ Khaled featuring Drake

from the album Grateful
- Released: June 5, 2017
- Recorded: 2017
- Genre: Chicago juke, Footwork
- Length: 3:13
- Label: We the Best; Epic
- Songwriters: Khaled Khaled; Aubrey Graham; Teairra Mari; Jodie Aysha; Joshua Joseph; Eamon Doyle; Kirk Robinson; Yared Williams; Selassie Ward
- Producer: JayO

"To the Max" is a song written and performed by American musician DJ Khaled, featuring Canadian rapper Drake. The song was released on June 5, 2017, by We the Best and Epic Records as a promotional single from Khaled's tenth studio album, Grateful (2017). It however was removed from the album and legal streaming platforms such as Spotify and Apple Music. The song contains a sample of the 2007 song "Heartbroken" by British artists T2 (who produced it) and Jodie Aysha (who wrote and performed it). American DJ Jayhood remixed "Heartbroken" in 2009 then later in 2015, Haitian-American producer JayO remixed DJ Jayhood's remix of "Heartbroken" and named it "Gus Get Em Right". All the above remixes of "Heartbroken" were used by DJ Khaled without credits to, or permission from T2 and Jodie Aysha. A further sample used includes "Lit" by 1WayFrank.

== Composition ==
"To the Max" is in the key of D flat major. The tempo is 160 BPM with a time signature of 4/4.

== Charts ==
Chart (2017)	Peak position
Australia (ARIA)	70
Belgium Urban (Ultratop Flanders)	31
Canada Hot 100 (Billboard)	32
France Downloads (SNEP)	200
Ireland (IRMA)	83
New Zealand Heatseekers (RMNZ)	2
Portugal (AFP)	72
Scotland Singles (OCC)	72
Slovakia Singles Digital (ČNS IFPI)	80
UK Singles (OCC)	49
US Billboard Hot 100	53
US Hot R&B/Hip-Hop Songs (Billboard)	22
US Rhythmic Airplay (Billboard)	39

== Certifications ==
Region	Certification	Certified units/sales
United States (RIAA)	Gold	500,000^{‡}
^{‡} Sales+streaming figures based on certification alone.
