= Domino Effect (disambiguation) =

The domino effect is a type of chain reaction.

Domino Effect may also refer to:

- The domino theory, a political theory about the spread of communism
  - Revolutionary wave
- Domino Effect (The Blizzards album), 2008
- Domino Effect (Gotthard album), 2007
- "Domino Effect" (Addictive song), 2009
- "Domino Effect", a song by Ozma, from their album Rock and Roll Part Three
- The Domino Effect (novel), a 2003 Doctor Who novel
- "The Domino Effect" (Amphibia), a segment from a 2019 television episode
- "The Domino Effect" (The Bold Type), a 2018 television episode
- "The Domino Effect" (Sex and the City), a 2003 television episode
- The Domino Effect (concert), a 2009 tribute concert to Fats Domino
- The Domino Effect, an album by Zerra One
- Domino Effect (TV series), a Polish documentary series, 2014
