= Love Shy (song) =

1998 song by Kristine Blond

Single by Kristine Blond
- Released: 1998
- Length: 3:20
- Label: Warner
- Songwriter: William Hort Mann
- Producer: Cutfather & Joe

Kristine Blond singles chronology
"Love Shy" (1998)	"You Belong to Someone Else" (2001)

"Love Shy" is a song by the Danish singer Kristine Blond, released as a single in 1998. It peaked at number 22 on the UK Singles Chart. Two years later, it reached the top forty in the UK again, landing at number 28 in November 2000, due to the Club Asylum remix of the track becoming a UK garage club hit. The theme of the song discussed incelibacy and overcoming it.

It was the first of two hit singles for Kristine Blond. She returned to the UK chart for the final time in 2002 with "You Make Me Go Oooh" which made number 35.

In 2016 for Dummy Mag, UK garage musician Wookie ranked the Club Asylum remix at number five in his list of the "10 Best Garage Tracks", saying "One of the many good remixes of this late '90s track by Danish singer, Kristine Blond. Club Asylum gave it a fresh 2-step vibe in 2000, which was guaranteed to get all the girls singing. Feel good era!"

Mixmag included the Tuff Jam vocal mix of "Love Shy" in their list of "16 of the Best Uplifting Vocal Garage Tracks".

"Love Shy" was re-worked by British group Platnum and released in 2008 with the title "Love Shy (Thinking About You)", reaching number 12 in the UK Singles Chart.

== Charts ==
Chart (1998)	Peak position
Scottish Singles Sales (Official Charts)	43
UK Singles (Official Charts)	22
UK Dance (Official Charts)	1
Chart (2000)	Peak position
Scottish Singles Sales (Official Charts)	48
UK Singles (Official Charts)	28
UK Dance (Official Charts)	3

== Certifications ==
Region	Certification	Certified units/sales
United Kingdom (BPI)	Platinum	600,000^{‡}
^{‡} Sales+streaming figures based on certification alone.

== Platnum version ==
"Love Shy (Thinking About You)"

Single by Platnum
- Released: 29 October 2008
- Recorded: March 2008
- Genre: Bassline
- Length: 2:55
- Label: Hard2Beat
- Songwriters: William Hort Mann, Aaron Evers, Mina Poli, Michelle McKenna

Platnum singles chronology
"What's It Gonna Be" (2008)	"Love Shy (Thinking About You)" (2008)

"Love Shy (Thinking About You)" (often shortened to "Love Shy") is the second single by the British bassline group Platnum. It was released after the success of "What's It Gonna Be" with H "Two" O. The original version of "Love Shy" had been given a bassline makeover by DJ/producer Shaun 'Banger' Scott at the end of 2007. On 5 October 2008, the song entered the UK Singles Chart at No. 20 on downloads alone and subsequently peaked at No. 12.

=== Charts ===
==== Weekly charts ====
Chart (2008)	Peak position
Scottish Singles Sales (Official Charts)	11
UK Singles (Official Charts)	12
UK Dance (Official Charts)	3

==== Year-end charts ====
Chart (2008)	Position
UK Singles (OCC)	160

=== Certifications ===
Region	Certification	Certified units/sales
United Kingdom (BPI)	Silver	200,000^{‡}
^{‡} Sales+streaming figures based on certification alone.
