= Micah Richards =

English footballer and pundit (born 1988)

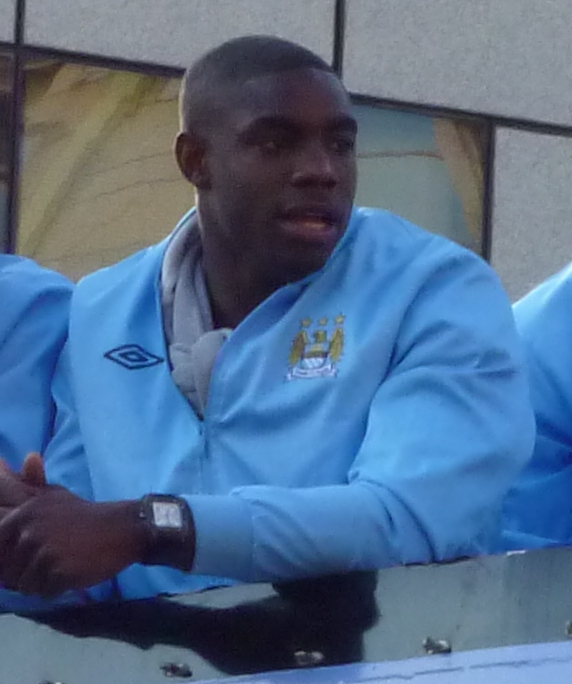
- Richards in 2012

Personal information
- Full name: Micah Lincoln Richards
- Date of birth: 24 June 1988 (age 38)
- Place of birth: Birmingham, England
- Height: 5 ft 11 in (1.80 m)
- Position: Right-back

Youth career
- Leeds City School Boys
- –2000: Leeds United
- 2000–2001: Oldham Athletic
- 2001–2005: Manchester City

Senior career*
Years	Team	Apps	(Gls)
2005–2015	Manchester City	179	(7)
2014–2015	→ Fiorentina (loan)	10	(0)
2015–2019	Aston Villa	26	(1)
Total		215	(8)

International career
2003–2004	England U16	4	(0)
2005–2006	England U19	3	(0)
2006–2011	England U21	15	(3)
2006–2012	England	13	(1)
2012	Great Britain Olympic	5	(0)
- * Club domestic league appearances and goals

Micah Lincoln Richards (born 24 June 1988) is an English professional football pundit and former player who played as a right-back.

Richards began his senior career with Manchester City and made 245 appearances in ten seasons, winning a Premier League title and an FA Cup. After a season on loan at Fiorentina in Italy's Serie A, he joined Aston Villa in 2015. Richards played 31 times for Villa until October 2016, with several knee injuries restricting his appearances, before retiring in July 2019.

Richards made his full international debut in November 2006, the youngest defender to be selected by England. He won 13 caps for England between 2006 and 2012 and played for the Great Britain team in the 2012 Olympics.

Since his retirement, Richards has worked as a pundit for Sky Sports, BBC Sport and CBS Sports. He is one of the hosts of the podcast The Rest Is Football alongside Alan Shearer and Gary Lineker.

== Club career ==
=== Early career ===
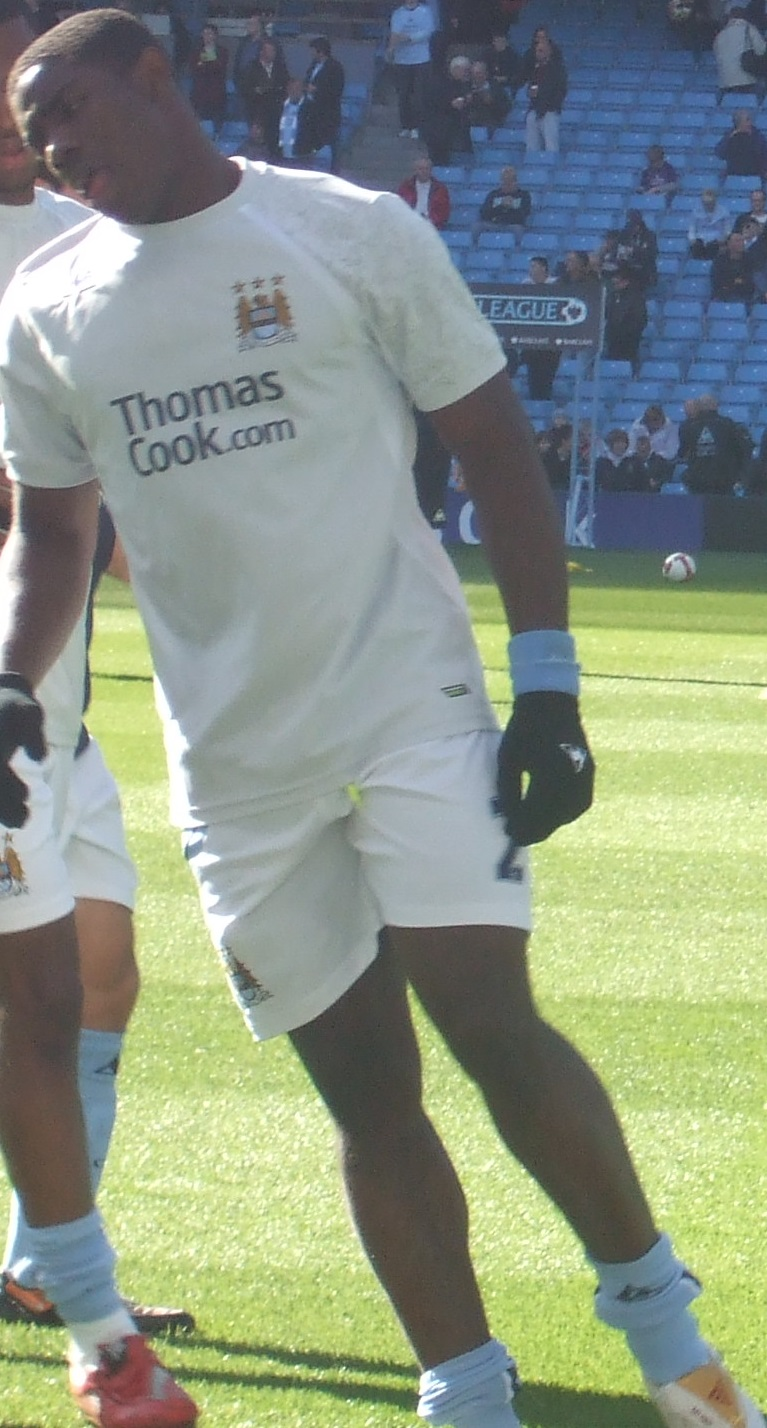
Richards training with Manchester City in 2008

Although Richards was born in Birmingham, he grew up in Chapeltown, Leeds. Richards began playing football when he was young and played for the Leeds United youth system as a striker, but was released when he was around eight years old. He also represented Leeds Schools FA (Leeds City Boys) at a young age. Richards later moved to playing in either the centre-back or right-back positions.

He later played for the Oldham Athletic youth system, moving to Manchester City as a 14-year-old, with Oldham reputedly having a 20 per cent sell-on clause. In July 2006, Manchester City reportedly tried to buy out the clause but Oldham refused. He also attended the Brazilian Soccer Schools scheme and retains strong links with the programme, with his father Lincoln running a Brazilian Soccer School in Chapeltown.

Richards progressed through Manchester City's youth system. Despite initially struggling to get a YTS contract, he later signed his first professional contract with the club in 2005.

=== Manchester City ===
In the summer of 2005, Richards was called up by Manchester City's first team for the Premier League Asia Trophy. He was later promoted to the first team in early October 2005. Richards made his first-team debut on 22 October 2005 against Arsenal, coming on as a substitute for Danny Mills in the 85th minute of a 1–0 defeat at Highbury. After the match, he said it was the most memorable day of his life. It was not until 1 February 2006 that he made another appearance, again as a late replacement in a 3–0 win over Newcastle United. Eleven days later, he made his first start, playing the full 90 minutes in a 3–2 win over Charlton Athletic. His first goal came on 19 February, heading in a last-minute corner to earn a 1–1 draw away to Aston Villa in the fifth round of the FA Cup. City manager Stuart Pearce praised his performance after the match. Richards swore on live national television when interviewed after the game, later reflecting that "I won the Premier League and played for England but it seems everyone always remembers me best for swearing live on BBC One on a Sunday afternoon". Following this game, he then received a handful of first-team appearances for the remaining matches of the 2005–06 season. At the end of the 2005–06 season, he went on to make sixteen appearances and scoring once in all competitions.

In July 2006, Manchester City rejected a bid of £5 million for Richards from Tottenham Hotspur. On 25 July 2006, he signed a new four-year contract, quashing rumours of a move away from the City of Manchester Stadium. At the start of the 2006–07 season, Richards helped the side keep two clean sheets between 23 August 2006 and 26 August 2006. However, during a 1–0 loss against Reading on 11 September 2006, he was criticised by Pearce after reacting furiously when he was substituted in the 60th minute and threw his shirt to the ground and waved his arms in disgust. Despite this, Richards continued to remain in the first team for the side and was praised once again by Pearce for his professionalism. At one point during the 2006–07 season, he played in a central midfield position, due to limit availability. Richards then scored his first goal of the season, in a 1–1 draw against Everton on 30 September 2006. He appeared in every match until he was dropped in December, due to a leg injury following a 2–1 loss against Tottenham Hotspur on 16 December 2006. But he made his return from injury, playing the full game in a 1–0 win over Sheffield United on 26 December 2006. In a follow–up match against West Ham United, Richards kept another clean sheet, in a 1–0 win. Over the next months, he competed with Hatem Trabelsi and Danny Mills over the right-back position. However, Richards suffered a calf injury and had to be substituted during a 2–0 win over Middlesbrough on 17 March 2007, resulting in him sidelined for the remaining matches of the season. Despite this, Richards was nominated for the PFA Young Player of the Year award at the end of the 2006–07 season. Although he lost out to Cristiano Ronaldo, he was nevertheless awarded the Young Player of the Season by the Official Supporters' Club. At the end of the 2006–07 season, he went on to make thirty–five appearances and scoring once in all competitions.

Throughout 2007, Richards was linked with a move away from City, Stuart Pearce said "I am not actively looking to sell Micah because he has a great future here. Whatever offers come in for him, it is going to take a ridiculously big offer to get him out of this football club. I would love to see Micah stay here, captain the club, and maybe be here for 10 years and carry the club on his back if he can. He is good enough to do it. I have not worked with anyone so good and so young." He later responded to the transfer speculation that he reaffirmed his commitment to stay at Manchester City.

In the 2007–08 season, Richards continued to be in the first team, having recovered from a calf injury and played in the pre–season friendly matches. Richards started the season well when he helped Manchester City's defence to keep three clean sheets in the first three league matches, including against rivals, Manchester United. His performance was praised by manager Sven-Göran Eriksson. As a result, he was named the Barclays player of the month award for August. Richards then captained the team for the first time on 16 September 2007 against Aston Villa in the absence of teammate Richard Dunne, making him City's youngest ever first-team captain, beating the 21-year-old Steve Redmond. After the match, he said it was the "proudest moment" of his career. Following a 6–0 loss against Chelsea on 27 October 2007, Richards acknowledged his mistakes for conceding "a couple of goals" on his columns. After missing one match due to an injury, he returned to the starting line-up against Portsmouth on 11 November 2007, and kept a clean sheet, in a 0–0 draw. Since the start of the 2007–08 season, Richards regained his first-team place, playing in the right-back position. It was announced on 8 February 2008 that he signed an improved contract to last until June 2013. However, by the end of February, Richards suffered a knee injury that saw him sidelined for six weeks. Although he returned to training in early–April, Richards didn't play for the side for the rest of the 2007–08 season. During the season, he was involved in heated rows with the opposition teams, which resulted in him getting booked. Despite this, Richards was nominated for a second time for the PFA Young Player of the Year award at the end of the 2007–08 season. At the end of the 2007–08 season, he went on to make twenty–nine appearances in all competitions.

At the start of the 2008–09 season, Richards played his first full match back from injury in the 2–0 win against EB/Streymur in the first qualifying round of the UEFA Cup on 17 July 2008. However, during a 3–0 win over West Ham United on 24 August 2008, he collided with team-mate Tal Ben Haim after a clash of heads, resulting in him being substituted and taken to hospital with a concussion. But he was released from the hospital after the result in a scan came back was all clear. Richards was able to return to the first team, starting the whole game and keeping a clean sheet, in a 3–0 win over Sunderland on 31 August 2008. He then captained Manchester City for the first time this season, helping the side progress to the UEFA Cup group stage after beating Omonia 2–1 on 2 October 2008. Richards continued to hold onto the right-back position despite competition from Nedum Onuoha and Pablo Zabaleta. However, his performance received criticism by fans throughout December. On 22 March 2009, he scored his first goal of the 2008–09 season with a header in a man of the match performance giving a 1–0 victory over Sunderland at the City of Manchester Stadium. However, both Richards and manager Mark Hughes played down training ground bust-up after the British newspapers claimed the pair had argued during the training sessions, insisting it was a minor situation. In the last game of the season against Bolton Wanderers, he set up Felipe Caicedo to score the only goal of the game. Despite being sidelined on two occasions later in the 2008–09 season, he went on to make fifty appearances and scoring once in all competitions. During the season, Richards spoke out about the new ownership with the club that it could take four years to reach their potentials.

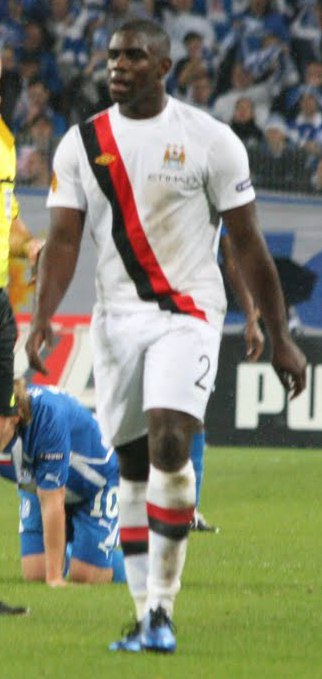
Richards playing for Manchester City in 2010

In July 2009, Richards was diagnosed with swine flu while on holiday in Cyprus, and was kept in isolation after returning from Ayia Napa. He was able to recover and featured in the club's remaining pre–season matches. At the start of the season, Richards started the season well when he kept three clean sheets in the first three league matches. He then played a vital role against Arsenal on 12 September 2009 when he scored and set up two goals, in a 4–2 win. From the start of the 2009–10 season, Richards continued to face competition from Onuoha and Zabaleta for the right-back position, resulting in his being placed on the substitute bench over the season. In spite of this, he regained his first-team place, playing at centre-back, or right-back when there was an absence in the club's defence or when Zabaleta was played in a different position. His lack of playing time led to reports that he was expecting to leave the club, a claim denied by both Richards and manager Hughes. His first goal of the 2009–10 season came on 12 December 2009, in a 3–3 draw against Bolton Wanderers. His second goal of the season then came on 11 January 2010, in a 4–1 win over Blackburn Rovers. Despite facing his own injury concerns during the 2009–10 season, Richards went on to make twenty–nine appearances and score twice in all competitions.

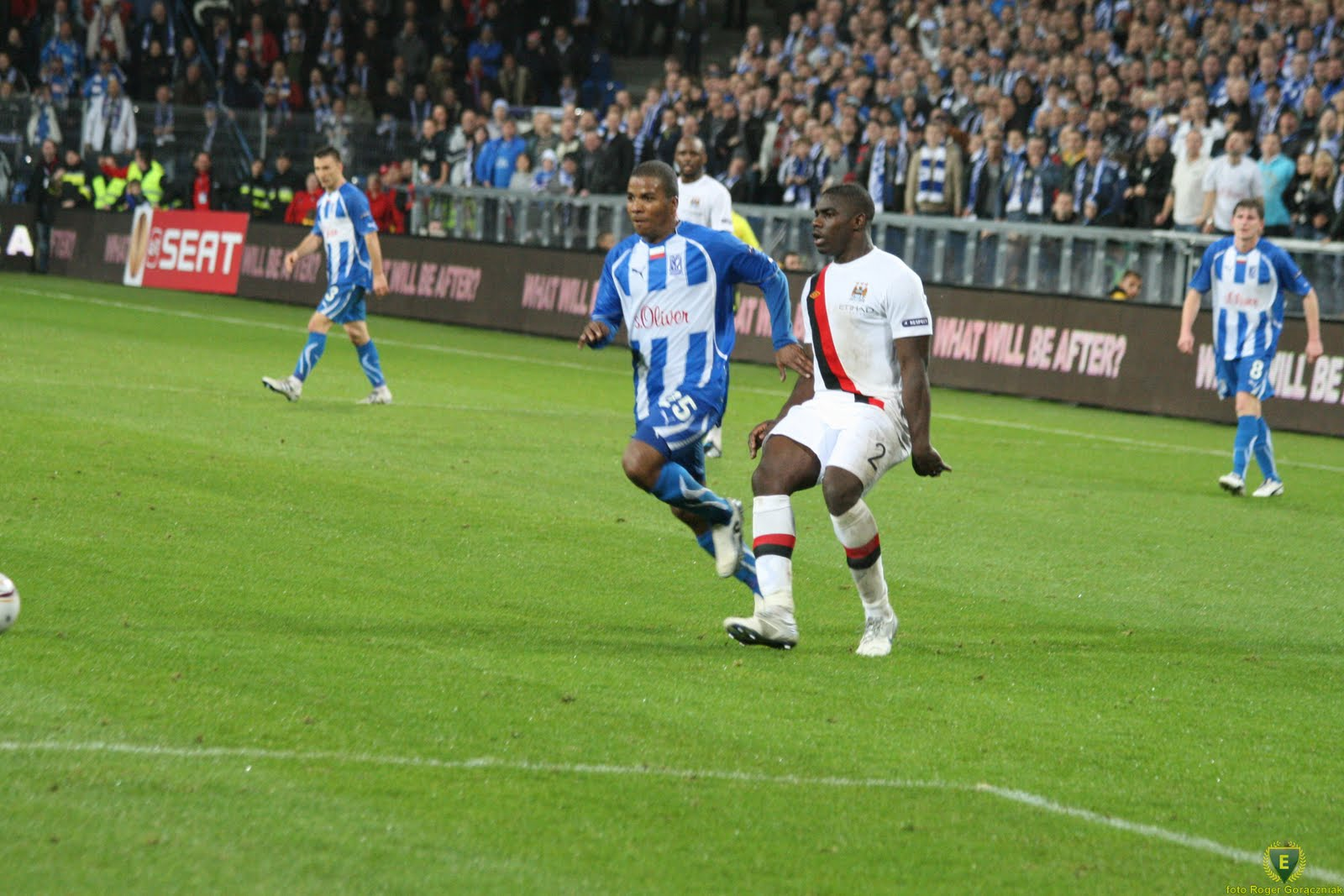
Richards passes the ball as Luis Henríquez looks on; Manchester City were playing against Lech Poznań in November 2010.

Ahead of the 2010–11 season, Richards announced his intention to stay at the club and dismissed suggestions of leaving. Following this, manager Robert Mancini expected Richards to fight for his first-team place. He was featured in the starting line-up for the first five league matches of the season. During this, Richards played a role when he set up the club's second goal of the game, in a 3–0 win over Liverpool on 23 August 2010. Since the start of the 2010–11 season, Richards continued to face competitions with Jérôme Boateng and Zabaleta for the right-back position. Despite this, he appeared in the starting line-up, mostly making starts in the club's cup competitions. It was not until on 27 November 2010 when Richards scored his first goal of the season, in a 1–1 draw against Stoke City. Two months later on 30 January 2011, he set up a goal for Edin Džeko, resulting a 1–1 draw in the fourth round of the FA Cup, which saw them earn a replay at the City of Manchester Stadium. In the fourth round of FA Cup replay against Notts County, Richards scored the club's fifth goal of the game, in a 5–0 win to send through to the next round. A month later on 13 March 2011, he scored again in a FA Cup match, in a 1–0 win over Reading. Despite facing his own injury concerns he faced later in the 2010–11 season, Richards started for City as they beat Stoke City 1–0 at Wembley Stadium in the 2011 FA Cup Final. Following the match, ITV, who aired the FA Cup final, apologised after both Richards and Mario Balotelli swore live during post-match interviews on the pitch. At the end of the 2010–11 season, he went on to make thirty–one appearances and scoring three times in all competitions.

At the start of the 2011–12 season, Richards set up the two goals in the first two league matches to give Manchester City a perfect start to the season. By the end of August, he signed a contract extension with the club, keeping him until 2015. Richards made his UEFA Champions League debut, starting the whole game, in a 2–0 loss against Bayern Munich, in what turned out to be his only appearance in the competition. Since the start of the 2011–12 season, he established himself in the starting 11, playing in the right-back position. But Richards found himself rotated under Mancini's management, which saw him dropped from the first team at times. Richards then set up two goals in two matches between 15 October 2011 and 23 October 2011, including one in a 6–1 win over rivals, Manchester United. This was followed up by making his 200th appearance for Manchester City, in a 3–1 win over Wolverhampton Wanderers on 29 October 2011. It was not until on 19 November 2011 when he scored his first goal of the season, followed up by setting up the club's third goal of the game, in a 3–1 win over Newcastle United. After the match, his performance was praised by teammate, Joleon Lescott. Between December and February, Richards found himself out of the first team on three occasions, due to injuries. He captained the side on three occasions as well: twice against Liverpool in both legs in the League Cup and once in the league against Fulham. Towards the end of the 2011–12 season, Richards' playing time was reduced and found himself placed on the substitute bench, due to the hamstring injury he sustained. Despite this, Manchester City won the Premier League in 2011–12, and Richards was nominated for the club's Player of the Year award. In addition to making thirty–seven appearances and scoring once in all competitions, Richards finished the season with five assists – the most of any defender in the Premier League.

At the start of the 2012–13 season, Richards suffered an ankle injury during the Summer Olympics tournament and was sidelined for a month. By mid–September, he returned to full training. It was not until on 6 October 2012, Richards made his first appearance of the season, starting the whole game, in a 3–0 win over Sunderland. He went on to make three more appearances for the side throughout October. However, Richards suffered a knee injury during a 1–0 win over Swansea City and was sidelined for four months. By March, he returned to full training. It was not until on 17 April 2013, Richards made his return to the first team, starting a match before being substituted in the 83rd minute, in a 1–0 win over Wigan Athletic. However, his return was short–lived when he was dropped by Mancini in the first team, including the FA Cup Final. But Richards made his return to the starting line-up for the remaining three matches of the season, including being a captain against Reading on 14 May 2013. At the end of the 2012–13 season, he went on to make eight appearances in all competitions.

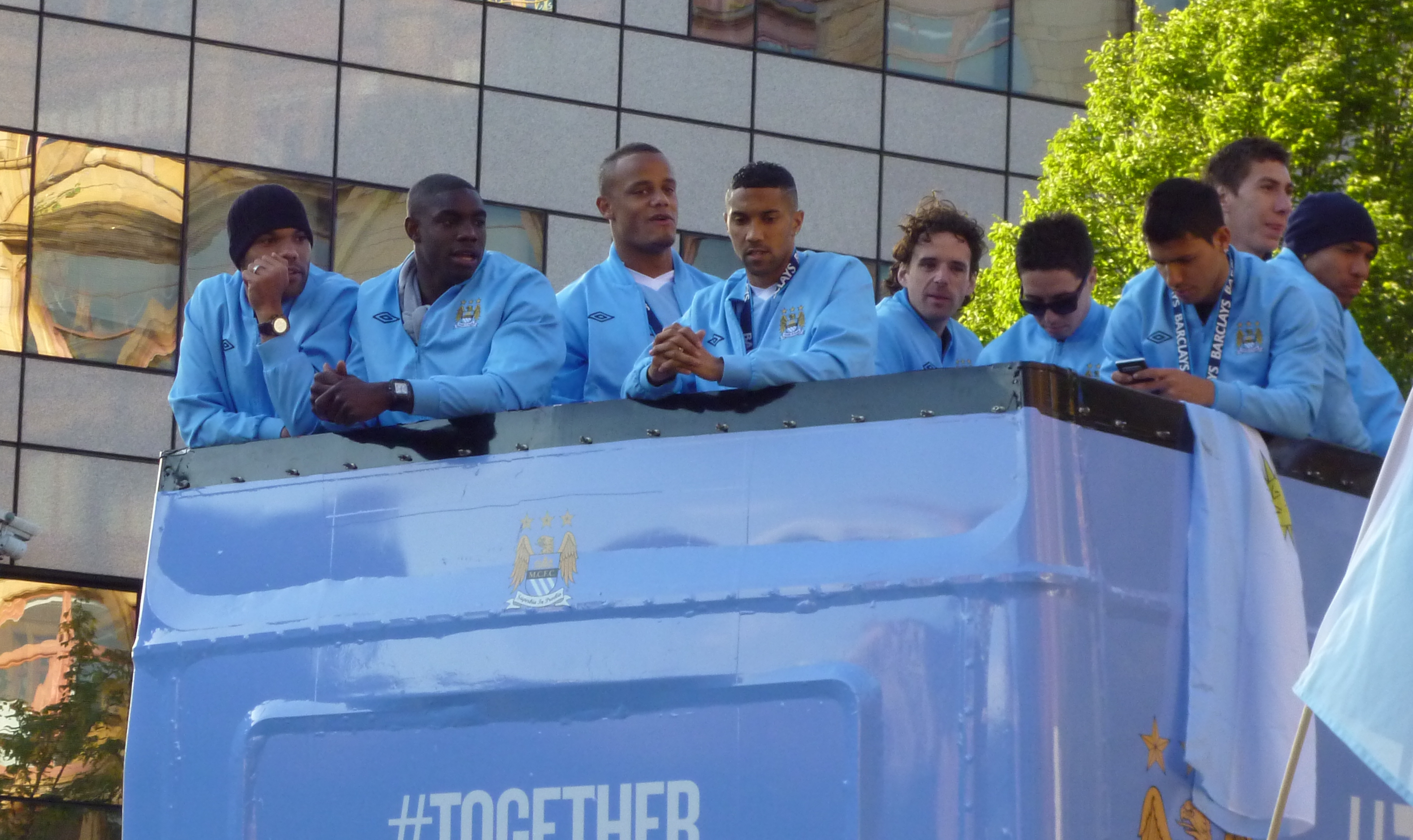
Richards (second left) on an open-top bus victory parade after Manchester City won the Premier League, 2012.

At the start of the 2013–14 season, Richards said he was going to fight his way back to the starting line-up, under the new management of Manuel Pellegrini. Around the same time, Richards dismissed transfer speculation that he was leaving the club after reports that clubs from Europe were interested in signing him. However, he suffered a thigh injury that saw him sidelined throughout August. It was not until on 24 September 2013 when Richards made his first appearance of the season, starting as captain, and set up the club's second goal of the game, in a 5–0 win over Wigan Athletic in the third round of the League Cup. A month later on 19 October 2013, he made his first Premier League appearance of the season, starting the whole game, in a 3–1 win over West Ham United. In a 2–0 win over Newcastle United on 30 October 2013 in the round of 16 of League Cup, Richards captained the side for the whole game throughout extra time to send the side through to the next round. Following this, he appeared on the substitute bench, having lost his place in the first team to Zabaleta. However, during a 3–2 win over Bayern Munich on 10 December 2013 in a UEFA Champions League Group Stage match, Richards suffered a hamstring injury and was sidelined for a month. He did not make his return from injury until on 15 January 2014, starting a match, in a 5–0 win over Blackburn Rovers in the third round replay of the FA Cup. Following this, Richards made two more appearances in the FA Cup matches later in the 2013–14 season. Despite this, he continued to have his first-team opportunities limited for the remaining matches of the season. As a result, it was reported in March 2014 that Richards turned down a new contract offered by the club, leaving his future uncertain. He later confirmed the news in September 2014. Despite Manchester City winning the league again in 2013–14, he made only two league appearances and missed out on a Premier League winner's medal.

Ahead of the 2014–15 season, Richards was expected to leave Manchester City. It came after when he was linked away from the club, as his contract was expecting to expire at the end of the season. Amid the transfer speculation, Richards made his only appearance of the season for Manchester City, coming on as a late substitute, in a 3–0 loss against Arsenal in the FA Community Shield.

On 10 June 2015, Richards was released by Manchester City. By the time he departed the club, Richards was described by local newspaper Manchester Evening News as "a true survivor" since the takeover in 2008.

==== Fiorentina (loan) ====
On 1 September 2014, Richards signed for Fiorentina on a season-long loan. The loan fee was £3.5m rising to £4.7m should the transfer be made permanent at the end.

Seventeen days after signing on 18 September 2014, Richards made his Fiorentina debut in a UEFA Europa League match against Guingamp, coming on as a substitute for former City teammate Stefan Savić, and set up the club's third goal of the game, in a 3–0 win. Three days later on 21 September 2014, he made his league debut for the club, coming on as a late substitute, in a 1–0 win over Atalanta. On 28 September 2014, Richards made his first Serie A start for Fiorentina against Torino. Richards chose not to remain at Fiorentina; he only made 10 appearances in the league and a further seven in European competitions as manager Vincenzo Montella switched to a 3–5–2 formation after Richards had arrived. He also faced his own injury concern along the way.

=== Aston Villa ===
On 17 June 2015, Richards signed for Aston Villa on a free transfer after agreeing a four-year contract. Upon joining the club, he was given a number four shirt ahead of the new season.

Richards was named their on-field captain for the upcoming Premier League season on 5 August, and on his debut three days later, Villa won 1–0 away to AFC Bournemouth. During a 2–1 loss against Swansea City on 24 October 2015, he was involved in an altercation with Federico Fernández. Following this, Richards served a three match suspension after being involved in an incident at the tunnel during the match. On 28 November 2015, he scored his first goal for Villa, heading an equaliser in a 2–3 home loss to Watford. However, Richards suffered a knee injury that saw him miss four matches. His absence was commented on by pundit Stan Collymore following the club's run of three draws in four matches. It was not until on 26 December 2015 when Richards made his return to the starting line-up, in a 2–0 loss against Norwich City. After the match, he took to his Twitter account and criticised pundit Ian Wright's comment about the club's performance. Richards then scored his second goal for the club, in a 1–1 draw against Wycombe Wanderers in the third round of the FA Cup. After the match, Richards was praised by manager Remi Garde when he dealt with the situation with the club's supporters. Having started out playing in the centre-back position, he then played in the right-back position. As captain, Richards found themselves fighting for survival from relegation following a poor start since the start of the season. Towards the end of the 2015–16 season, Richards was featured in and out of the first team, as the club were relegated to Championship. At the end of the 2015–16 season, he went on to make twenty–eight appearances and scoring two times in all competitions.

Following Villa's relegation, several clubs were rumoured to be interested in signing him, with an alleged £5 million release clause becoming a point of discussion, but he stayed at the club as the summer transfer window closed. His first appearance of the 2016–17 season came on 10 August 2016 against Luton Town, captaining the side for the whole game, in a 3–1 loss in the first round of the League Cup. He made his first start of the 2016–17 Championship season in a 1–1 draw at home to Wolves on 15 October 2016, which was also Steve Bruce's first match in charge of the club, but was sidelined with a knee injury until the new year. Since returning from injury in January, Richards was placed on the substitute bench for the remaining matches for the 2016–17 season. At the end of the 2016–17 season, he went on to make three appearances in all competitions.

He did not make a single appearance in 2017–18, with Bruce attributing that to consistent lack of fitness. Despite speculation that Richards would leave Aston Villa before the transfer deadline for the 2018–19 season, he remained at the club, although he was not considered for first-team selection and spent another season without making an appearance. His knee issues continued to keep him out the team, and he alleged that fans abused him during this injury.

Richards was released by Aston Villa at the end of the 2018–19 season. He announced his retirement from playing on 26 July 2019, at the age of 31.

== International career ==
=== England youth team ===
Richards made two appearances for the England under-16 side. For the next two years, he was called up to England U18 and England U19.

=== England under-21 team ===
On 16 August 2006, Richards made his England U21 debut, playing the whole game, in a 2–2 draw against Moldova U21. During a 2–0 win over German under-21s on 10 October 2006, opposition player Aaron Hunt racially abused both Richards and Anton Ferdinand, leading Hunt to be banned for two matches. This led the German Football Association to successfully overturn the suspension.

For most of his exile from the senior team, Richards was still young enough to be eligible for the under-21s, and played regularly. He was called up for the 2009 UEFA European Under-21 Championship held in Sweden, where he scored the winning goal against Finland as England went through the group stages undefeated. England reached the final of the competition, but lost 4–0 to Germany. Richards played in four of England's five matches, including the final. He captained England U21 on three occasions between late–2009 and once in his only appearance of 2010. During qualifying for the 2011 tournament, Richards captained the team. However, he had to withdraw from the squad for the finals due to injury.

=== England senior team ===
In November 2006, Richards received a call-up to the England squad for a friendly against the Netherlands after playing only 28 professional club matches. He had previously won three caps for the England under-21 team, and was chosen to start the match on 15 November 2006 against the Netherlands after regular right-back Gary Neville withdrew through injury. It made him England's youngest-ever defender, breaking the record previously held by Rio Ferdinand. After the game finished in a 1–1 draw, pundits Alan Hansen and Alan Shearer both praised Richards' performance.

He scored his first international goal in the UEFA Euro 2008 qualifier against Israel on 8 September 2007 at Wembley Stadium. Richards reflected on his BBC Sport column, saying that it was a great day for him. Richards played regularly during Steve McClaren's time as England manager, making 11 appearances.

However, following McClaren's sacking in November 2007, Richards fell out of favour. In Fabio Capello's four years in charge of the England team, Richards played only once, as a substitute against France in November 2010. Upon Capello's resignation in February 2012, Richards spoke of his frustration: "To be frozen out of your international side is hard to take sometimes. Everyone wants to play for their international team, especially when you're playing in a team that's doing so well. I didn't get a chance under Capello. I don't know why. I always asked the question, but I never got an answer."

Following Capello's resignation in February 2012, Richards gained an immediate recall to the England team. Caretaker coach Stuart Pearce had coached Richards at both Manchester City and for the under-21s, and selected him to play against the Netherlands. However, when new coach Roy Hodgson named his squad for UEFA Euro 2012, Richards was omitted. Hodgson explained his decision by saying "It was going to be one of Phil Jones or Micah Richards and I chose Jones."

=== Great Britain Olympic football team ===
On 28 June 2012, Richards was confirmed as one of the three over-aged players selected by manager Stuart Pearce for Great Britain at the 2012 Summer Olympics, alongside Craig Bellamy and Ryan Giggs. He said it was an honour to be called up for the squad.

Richards played the full match in the tournament's opening fixture against Senegal; which ended 1–1. He started all the remaining matches of the tournament, as Great Britain were eliminated by South Korea U23 on penalties.

== Media career ==
After his retirement, Richards began working as a pundit for Sky Sports and BBC Sport, appearing across radio and television, including Match of the Day and hosting the podcast The Rest is Football. He also became a part of CBS Sports's UEFA Champions League coverage, notably featuring with Kate Scott, Jamie Carragher, and Thierry Henry in a show that achieved widespread critical acclaim.

As a paid representative of Manchester City, Richards has been a vocal defendant of the team on various programmes since their conviction on "almost all" charges of financial breaches in the Premier League and failure to cooperate with the investigation.

== Other activities ==
In 2007, Richards and fellow footballer Anton Ferdinand featured in the music video for the song "Heartbroken" by T2. He is shown picking T2 up from his house in a Range Rover and hanging out in a bar with Ferdinand.

In November 2024, it was announced that Richards was set to manage one of the 12 teams in the upcoming Baller League UK, a six-a-side football league. He ended up managing the team Deportrio, along with Alan Shearer and Gary Lineker.

== Personal life ==
Richards is of Kittitian descent through his father who moved from Basseterre to England in the 1960s. He has credited his father for being a major influence on his career and keeping him grounded while growing up. Richards also credited his former teammate Richard Dunne for being a big influence on his early career. His first cousin, Atiba Harris, is also a former professional footballer and long-time captain of the Saint Kitts and Nevis national football team. Richards has two brothers, both of whom played football but never became professionals. Although Richards likes Leeds United, he supported Arsenal because of Ian Wright, due to his great character and as Wright "made him smile with his goal celebrations". Richards said that he "did alright at school" and got Cs in GCSEs Maths, English and Science.

Richards has one child, a son.

During his playing career, Richards was involved with Kick It Out, football's anti-racism campaign. In October 2012, he was among several footballers to not wear a Kick It Out anti-racism T-shirt, due to protest against the lack of action by the organisation in the wake of high-profile cases of footballers racially abusing their opponents during matches.

In December 2007, the News of the World published an article about Richards when he was involved in an incident in a disabled toilet. Although Sven-Goran Eriksson was upset by the incident, Richards faced no disciplinary action by the club.

In February 2022, Richards and Chris Sutton spoke about mental health issues in their playing careers.

In July 2026, Richards' father, Lincoln, died unexpectedly moments before England's semi-final match against Argentina at the 2026 FIFA World Cup.

=== Legal issues ===
In November 2006, Richards was involved in a legal action with Team Associates, who sued him for £1 million over a breach of contract after changing his agent the previous June.

In February 2009, Richards was arrested for alleged assault of a man outside of a nightclub in Hale, Greater Manchester, at around 12:30am. Ultimately, prosecutors decided to press no charges and the case was dropped.

== Career statistics ==
=== Club ===
Appearances and goals by club, season and competition
Club	Season	League			National cup (Note: Includes FA Cup, Coppa Italia)		League cup (Note: Includes Football League Cup)		Europe		Other		Total	
Club	Season	Division	Apps	Goals	Apps	Goals	Apps	Goals	Apps	Goals	Apps	Goals	Apps	Goals
Manchester City	2005–06	Premier League	13	0	3	1	0	0	—		—		16	1
Manchester City	2006–07	Premier League	28	1	5	0	1	0	—		—		34	1
Manchester City	2007–08	Premier League	25	0	2	0	2	0	—		—		29	0
Manchester City	2008–09	Premier League	34	1	1	0	0	0	15 (Note: Appearances in UEFA Cup)	0	—		50	1
Manchester City	2009–10	Premier League	23	3	2	0	4	0	—		—		29	3
Manchester City	2010–11	Premier League	18	1	5	2	0	0	8 (Note: Appearances in UEFA Europa League)	0	—		31	3
Manchester City	2011–12	Premier League	29	1	1	0	2	0	4 (Note: One appearance in UEFA Champions League, three appearances in UEFA Europa League)	0	1 (Note: Appearance in FA Community Shield)	0	37	1
Manchester City	2012–13	Premier League	7	0	0	0	0	0	1 (Note: Appearance(s) in UEFA Champions League)	0	0	0	8	0
Manchester City	2013–14	Premier League	2	0	3	0	2	0	3	0	—		10	0
Manchester City	2014–15	Premier League	0	0	—		—		—		1	0	1	0
Manchester City	Total		179	7	22	3	11	0	31	0	2	0	245	10
Fiorentina (loan)	2014–15	Serie A	10	0	2	0	—		7	0	—		19	0
Aston Villa	2015–16	Premier League	24	1	3	1	1	0	—		—		28	2
Aston Villa	2016–17	Championship	2	0	0	0	1	0	—		—		3	0
Aston Villa	2017–18	Championship	0	0	0	0	0	0	—		0	0	0	0
Aston Villa	2018–19	Championship	0	0	0	0	0	0	—		0	0	0	0
Aston Villa	Total		26	1	3	1	2	0	—		0	0	31	2
Career total			215	8	27	4	13	0	38	0	2	0	295	12

=== International ===
Appearances and goals by national team and year
National team	Year	Apps	Goals
England	2006	1	0
England	2007	10	1
England	2008	0	0
England	2009	0	0
England	2010	1	0
England	2011	0	0
England	2012	1	0
Total		13	1

England score listed first, score column indicates score after each Richards goal.

International goals by date, venue, cap, opponent, score, result and competition
No.	Date	Venue	Cap	Opponent	Score	Result	Competition	Ref.
1	8 September 2007	Wembley Stadium, London, England	6	Israel	3–0	3–0	UEFA Euro 2008 qualification	

== Honours ==
Manchester City

- Premier League: 2011–12
- FA Cup: 2010–11

England U21

- UEFA European Under-21 Championship runner-up: 2009

Individual

- Premier League Player of the Month: August 2007
- Young Sportsperson of the Year: 2007
