= List of UK R&B Albums Chart number ones of 2008 =

The logo of the Official Charts Company, responsible for compiling all of the official music charts in the United Kingdom, including the R&B albums chart.

The UK R&B Chart is a weekly chart, first introduced in October 1994, that ranks the 40 biggest-selling singles and albums that are classified in the R&B genre in the United Kingdom. The chart is compiled by the Official Charts Company, and is based on sales of CDs, downloads, vinyl and other formats over the previous seven days.

The following are the number-one albums of 2008.

== Number-one albums ==
Issue date	Album	Artist(s)	Record label	Ref.
6 January	Good Girl Gone Bad	Rihanna	Def Jam/SRP	
13 January	Back to Black	Amy Winehouse	Island	
20 January	Good Girl Gone Bad	Rihanna	Def Jam/SRP	
27 January	Lupe Fiasco's The Cool	Lupe Fiasco	1st & 15th/Atlantic	
3 February	Good Girl Gone Bad	Rihanna	Def Jam/SRP	
10 February	Growing Pains	Mary J. Blige	Geffen	
17 February	Back to Black	Amy Winehouse	Island	
24 February	Back to Black	Amy Winehouse	Island	
2 March ^{[a]}	Back to Black	Amy Winehouse	Island	
9 March	Back to Black	Amy Winehouse	Island	
16 March	Back to Black	Amy Winehouse	Island	
23 March	Back to Black	Amy Winehouse	Island	
30 March	Spirit	Leona Lewis	Syco/Sony BMG/J	
6 April	Shine	Estelle	Atlantic/Homeschool	
13 April	Step Up 2: The Streets	Various Artists	Atlantic/WEA	
20 April	E=MC²	Mariah Carey	Island	
27 April	E=MC²	Mariah Carey	Island	
4 May	Step Up 2: The Streets	Various Artists	Atlantic/WEA	
11 May	Back to Black	Amy Winehouse	Island	
18 May	My Own Way	Jay Sean	Jayded/2Point9	
25 May	R&B Collection	Various Artists	Universal Music TV	
1 June ^{[a]}	Here I Stand	Usher	LaFace	
8 June	Here I Stand	Usher	LaFace	
15 June	Tha Carter III	Lil Wayne	Cash Money/Universal Motown	
22 June	Tha Carter III	Lil Wayne	Cash Money/Universal Motown	
29 June	Exclusive	Chris Brown	Jive/Zomba	
6 July	Back to Black	Amy Winehouse	Island	
13 July	Exclusive	Chris Brown	Jive/Zomba	
20 July	Untitled	Nas	Def Jam/Columbia	
27 July	Exclusive	Chris Brown	Jive/Zomba	
3 August	Massive Weekend	Various Artists	Universal Music TV	
10 August	Chilled R&B	Various Artists	Sony BMG	
17 August	Chilled R&B	Various Artists	Sony BMG	
24 August	Essential R&B - Hit Selection	Various Artists	Rhino/Sony BMG	
31 August	LAX	The Game	Geffen	
7 September	LAX	The Game	Geffen	
14 September	LAX	The Game	Geffen	
21 September	Year of the Gentleman	Ne-Yo	Def Jam/Compound	
28 September	Good Girl Gone Bad	Rihanna	Def Jam/SRP	
5 October	Good Girl Gone Bad	Rihanna	Def Jam/SRP	
12 October	Good Girl Gone Bad	Rihanna	Def Jam/SRP	
19 October	Year of the Gentleman	Ne-Yo	Def Jam/Compound	
26 October	Year of the Gentleman	Ne-Yo	Def Jam/Compound	
2 November	Year of the Gentleman	Ne-Yo	Def Jam/Compound	
9 November	Year of the Gentleman	Ne-Yo	Def Jam/Compound	
16 November	The Ballads	Mariah Carey	Legacy/Columbia/Virgin	
23 November ^{[a]}	Spirit	Leona Lewis	Syco/Sony BMG/J	
30 November	Spirit	Leona Lewis	Syco/Sony BMG/J	
7 December	Spirit	Leona Lewis	Syco/Sony BMG/J	
14 December	Spirit	Leona Lewis	Syco/Sony BMG/J	
21 December	Spirit	Leona Lewis	Syco/Sony BMG/J	
28 December	Spirit	Leona Lewis	Syco/Sony BMG/J	

== Notes ==
- ^{a} - The album was simultaneously number-one on the UK albums chart.
- ^{b} - The artist was simultaneously number-one on the R&B singles chart.

== See also ==
- List of UK Albums Chart number ones of 2008
