= Addictive (English duo) =

English musical duo

- Origin: East London, England
- Genres: Pop, electropop, bassline
- Years active: 2008–present
- Label: 2NV Records
- Members: Aisha Stuart; Louise Bagan
- Website: http://www.myspace.com/officialaddictive

Addictive are an English musical duo based in East London, signed to 2NV Records, and consists of members Louise Bagan and Aisha Stuart. Both of them had plenty of singing experience, honing their skills in gospel choirs and talent shows.

== Music career ==
Both members have collaborated with several hit-making songwriters and record producers including Gordon Chambers, 88-Keys and Andy Chatterley. The duo's first single was the club anthem "Gonna Be Mine" featuring T2. It was the number 1 MTV Base video for three consecutive weeks, the number 1 MTV Dance video for two weeks, and reached number 3 on the BBC Radio 1 Dance Chart. The single had minor chart success on the UK Singles Chart, peaking at number 47.

The duo's next single, "Domino Effect" was recorded and mixed by Simon Gogerly, and the accompanying video was directed by Andy Hylton. The track was released on 19 October 2009.

"Domino Effect" was rated ‘Single of the Week’ by Now magazine, and was awarded 4/5 stars by Heat magazine and 5/5 stars by DJ magazine.

In 2010, they released the mixtape They Wonna Wife Me and released the single "Bad Girl" on 24 October 2010. The single was championed by celebrity blogger Perez Hilton.
