= Kristine Blond =

Danish singer and songwriter (born 1975)

Kristine Blond (born Anne-Kristine Blond on 16 April 1975) is a Danish singer and songwriter. Blond had success as a pop and R&B singer in the late 1990s and early 2000s. She achieved three top 40 hit singles on the UK Singles Chart. Her biggest hit, "Love Shy", peaked at No. 22 in 1998. A re-release of remixes was released in 2000 and peaked at No. 28, containing the popular UK garage mix by Club Asylum.

She released several singles in Denmark including "You Make Me Go Oooh", "You Belong to Someone Else" and "All I Ever Wanted".

In the early 2000s, Blond recorded the theme song "A Day Without You" for the Dutch television show Star Academy, which also charted in the Netherlands. Other releases in Germany and Denmark were "Teach Him" and "Fra i dag" (theme song for Peter Pan 2).

In 2008, Blond released a self-titled album changing musical direction to a more acoustic and non-commercial sound and began to write her own songs. She has since toured Denmark promoting the new material as well as performing her older material in the UK.

== Discography ==
=== Albums ===
- All I Ever Wanted (2001), WEA/Milkk
- Kristine Blond (2008), Hithouse

=== Singles ===
- "Love Shy" (1998), Reverb - UK #22, BPI: Gold
- "Love Shy (Remixes)" (2000), Relentless - UK #28
- "You Belong to Someone Else" (2001), WEA/Milkk
- "You Make Me Go Oooh" (2001), WEA/Milkk - UK #35
- "All I Ever Wanted" (2001), Warner
- "Teach Him" (2002), Milkk - GER #95
- "A Day Without You" (2002), Milkk - NETH #81
- "So Invincible" (with Funkstar De Luxe) (2008), 3some Music
- "Nothing Left" (2008), Hithouse
