= List of UK R&B Singles Chart number ones of 2008 =

The logo of the Official Charts Company, responsible for compiling all of the official music charts in the United Kingdom, including the R&B singles chart.

The UK R&B Chart is a weekly chart that ranks the 40 biggest-selling singles and albums that are classified in the R&B genre in the United Kingdom. The chart is compiled by the Official Charts Company, and is based on both physical and digital sales. This is a list of The Official UK Charts Company R&B hits of 2008.

== Number ones ==
Key
†	Best-selling R&B single of the year

Issue date	Single	Artist
6 January	"Crank That (Soulja Boy)"	Soulja Boy
13 January	"Crank That (Soulja Boy)"	Soulja Boy
20 January	"Superstar"	Lupe Fiasco featuring Matthew Santos
27 January	"Ride It"	Jay Sean
3 February	"Work"	Kelly Rowland
10 February	"Don't Stop the Music"	Rihanna
17 February	"Don't Stop the Music"	Rihanna
24 February	"Don't Stop the Music"	Rihanna
2 March	"Work"	Kelly Rowland
9 March	"Come On Girl"	Taio Cruz featuring Luciana
16 March	"Scream"	Timbaland featuring Keri Hilson and Nicole Scherzinger
23 March	"Scream"	Timbaland featuring Keri Hilson and Nicole Scherzinger
30 March	"American Boy" †	Estelle featuring Kanye West
6 April	"Touch My Body"	Mariah Carey
13 April	"American Boy" †	Estelle featuring Kanye West
20 April	"American Boy" †	Estelle featuring Kanye West
27 April	"4 Minutes"	Madonna featuring Justin Timberlake
4 May	"4 Minutes"	Madonna featuring Justin Timberlake
11 May	"4 Minutes"	Madonna featuring Justin Timberlake
18 May	"4 Minutes"	Madonna featuring Justin Timberlake
25 May	"Take a Bow"	Rihanna
1 June	"Take a Bow"	Rihanna
8 June	"4 Minutes"	Madonna featuring Justin Timberlake
15 June	"Take a Bow"	Rihanna
22 June	"Forever"	Chris Brown
29 June	"Closer"	Ne-Yo
6 July	"Closer"	Ne-Yo
13 July	"No Air"	Jordin Sparks featuring Chris Brown
20 July	"No Air"	Jordin Sparks featuring Chris Brown
27 July	"No Air"	Jordin Sparks featuring Chris Brown
3 August	"Stay With Me"	Ironik
10 August	"Stay With Me"	Ironik
17 August	"Stay With Me"	Ironik
24 August	"No Air"	Jordin Sparks Featuring Chris Brown
31 August	"Beggin"	Madcon
7 September	"Summertime"	New Kids on the Block
14 September	"When I Grow Up"	The Pussycat Dolls
21 September	"When I Grow Up"	The Pussycat Dolls
28 September	"When I Grow Up"	The Pussycat Dolls
5 October	"When I Grow Up"	The Pussycat Dolls
12 October	"When I Grow Up"	The Pussycat Dolls
19 October	"Paper Planes"	MIA
26 October	"My Life"	The Game featuring Lil Wayne
2 November	"My Life"	The Game featuring Lil Wayne
9 November	"Love Lockdown"	Kanye West
16 November	"If I Were a Boy"	Beyoncé
23 November	"If I Were a Boy"	Beyoncé
30 November	"Live Your Life"	T.I. featuring Rihanna
7 December	"Live Your Life"	T.I. featuring Rihanna
14 December	"Live Your Life"	T.I. featuring Rihanna
21 December	"If I Were a Boy"	Beyoncé
28 December	"Live Your Life"	T.I. featuring Rihanna

== See also ==
- List of UK Dance Singles Chart number ones of 2008
- List of UK Independent Singles Chart number ones of 2008
- List of UK Singles Downloads Chart number ones of the 2000s
- List of UK Rock & Metal Singles Chart number ones of 2008
- List of UK R&B Albums Chart number ones of 2008
