= Domino Effect (Addictive song) =

Single by Addictive
- Released: 4 October 2009
- Genre: Dance-pop
- Length: 3:27
- Label: 2NV
- Songwriter(s): Burhan Genc, Aisha Stuart, Louise Bagan, J. Samuel, Ameerah El Ouiglani, Terri Bjerre
- Producer(s): Burhan G

Addictive singles chronology
"Gonna Be Mine" (2008)	"Domino Effect" (2009)

"Domino Effect" is a song by the British girlpop-duo Addictive. It was released on 4 October 2009 on 2NV Records. The song is produced by Danish R&B-singer Burhan G and mixed by Simon Gogerly.

== Track listing ==
No.	Title	Length
1.	"Domino Effect" (Original Radio Edit)	3:27
2.	"Domino Effect" (Original Full Length Version)	4:28
3.	"Domino Effect" (Redtop Radio Edit)	3:25
4.	"Domino Effect" (Redtop Club Mix)	7:15
5.	"Domino Effect" (Redtop Dub Mix)	8:16
6.	"Domino Effect" (Crazy Couzins Hands Up Remix)	3:53
7.	"Domino Effect" (Crazy Couzinz Remix)	3:54
