= The Domino Effect (concert) =

The Domino Effect in New Orleans on May 30, 2009 was a tribute concert celebrating the life and influence of rock and roll legend Fats Domino. A portion of the proceeds were to benefit the Brees Dream Foundation, bettering local playgrounds and outdoor recreation sites for the children of New Orleans.

Fats Domino worked with NFL quarterback Drew Brees of the New Orleans Saints to raise money for the foundation’s "Operation Kids: Rebuilding Dreams" campaign, which supports education and mentoring programs as well as rebuilds athletic fields and parks. As of April 2009, the Brees Dream Foundation has donated over $1.5 million to various efforts supporting the New Orleans community.

== Lineup ==
(In no specific order)
B.B. King
Chuck Barry
Little Richard
Taj Mahal
Keb' Mo'
Ozomatli
Wyclef Jean
Junior Brown
