= Platnum =

British bassline vocal group

- Origin: Manchester, England
- Genres: Bassline, R&B, UK garage, grime
- Years active: 2004–present
- Label: All in Recordings Hard2Beat
- Members: Aaron Evers; Mina Poli
- Past members: Michelle McKenna
- Website: Platnum's Official Page

Platnum are a British bassline vocal group from Manchester, England. The original line-up consisted of male vocalist Aaron Evers and female vocalists Mina Poli and Michelle McKenna. The trio are best known for providing the vocals on H "Two" O's 2008 single, "What's It Gonna Be?", which reached number two in the UK Singles Chart in February 2008. Platnum, who formed around 2004, have worked with DJs Jamie Duggan and Q as well as producers Virgo and Nastee Boi.

The group's highly anticipated second single, "Love Shy (Thinking About You)" was released on 29 September 2008; they then started work on their debut album which became a mixtape. In autumn 2009, they supported N-Dubz on tour.

== Formation and early success ==
The group formed for a local talent show. The selected name for the new band was Urban Superstars, in around 2004. Although they did not win the competition, they used their entry track "Over the Heartache" to showcase their talents to established members of the UK bassline scene. The track proved popular, and a remix, by DJ Jamie Duggan, was awarded Bassline Heaven's 'Tune of the Year Award' in 2006. Damien Thompson (a.k.a. D-Tox) engineered and co-produced the track, but was not credited, as he was signed to the Reflective record label at the time. Nocturnal Records released the track on vinyl, in the same year. The track also had major interest from Ministry of Sound, with the prospect of a major release, but an agreement could not be made between the singers and producers as to whose name would be credited first in the title. The group have met many other singers and producers such as Sacha and S.U.D.

== 2004 and onwards ==
Previously when Michelle was a solo rapper and Aaron and Mina a duo, the three formed at a talent contest in Manchester at a young age. The song that they chose to sing in the final, "Over the Heartache", went on to become one of the most played bassline tracks of all time, combining a love song with a heavy bass. The group toured nationwide with N-Dubz and entered the UK Singles Chart with "What's It Gonna Be" (with H "Two" O) in early 2008.

After a coincidental meeting, Michelle was able to hand will.i.am a demo of their work. She then played another to producer DJ Poet, and the deal was sealed.

Teaming up with DJ Poet, the group returned to the UK bassline scene in 2012. Having already created an album called Lost in the Music, they released the first song, "Solar System", on 6 May 2012 via All In Recordings.

== Discography ==
=== Singles ===
| Year | Single | Chart | | Certifications |
| Year | Single | UK | IRE | Certifications |
|---|---|---|---|---|
| 2007 | "Over the Heartache" (Jamie Duggan Remix) | - | - | |
| 2008 | "What's It Gonna Be?" (with H "Two" O) | 2 | 6 | BPI: Platinum |
| 2008 | "Naughty" (feat. Wiley) | - | - | |
| 2008 | "Love Shy (Thinking About You)" | 12 | - | |
| 2009 | "Trippin" | - | - | |
| 2010 | "Emotionally Tired" | - | - | |
| 2010 | "Signals" | - | - | |
| 2011 | "Blind" (feat. TS7) | - | - | |
| 2011 | "Fire in My Eyes" (feat. TJ Lyricz & TS7) | - | - | |
| 2012 | "Solar System" | - | - | |
| 2012 | "Do It Different" | - | - | |
| 2013 | "Love You Tomorrow" | - | - | |
| 2018 | "Looking for Love" (with Sweet Female Attitude) | - | - | |
| 2020 | "On My Mind" | - | - | |
