= What's It Gonna Be (H "Two" O song) =

2008 single by H "Two" O

Single by H "Two" O featuring Platnum
- Released: 11 February 2008
- Genre: Bassline
- Length: 3:07
- Label: Hard2Beat; Ministry of Sound
- Songwriters: Selim Ben Rabha; Mina Poli
- Producer: Platnum

H "Two" O singles chronology
| "What's It Gonna Be" (2008) | "LoveWaster" (2008) |

Platnum singles chronology
| "What's It Gonna Be?" (2008) | "Love Shy (Thinking About You)" (2008) |

Music video
- "What's It Gonna Be" on YouTube

"What's It Gonna Be" is a song performed by British bassline duo H "Two" O and British bassline vocal group Platnum. Digital formats were released to online retailers in the UK on 11 February 2008. Physical formats, including a two-track CD single, a maxi-CD single, and a 12-inch vinyl disc, were released in the UK the same month. The track was licensed by dance label Hard2Beat and peaked at No. 2 on the UK Singles Chart for three weeks.

== Reception ==
Because of the popularity the song had in the underground scene (it had been circling around Sheffield nightclubs for a while), record label Hard2Beat decided to release it into mainstream success. It was generally well received on radio and was placed on the coveted A-list at BBC Radio 1. The track entered the UK Singles Chart at No. 7 on downloads alone on the chart dated 17 February 2008, following the single's CD release, "What's It Gonna Be?" rose to No. 2 on the chart dated 24 February 2008. The song also reached number No. 33 on the Dutch Top 40. Although the song was a chart success, some critics claimed its UK garage-style beat and characterless vocals made it banal.

== Music video ==
The music video was filmed in January 2008 at Dulwich College, an independent school in South London.

== Track listings ==
UK CD1

1. "What's It Gonna Be" (Agent X Re-rub edit)
2. "What's It Gonna Be" (Agent X Re-rub club mix)
3. "What's It Gonna Be" (Jason Herd's Mo'funk remix)
4. "What's It Gonna Be" (Thomas Gold remix)
5. "What's It Gonna Be" (Vandalism remix)
6. "What's It Gonna Be" (Jamie Duggan Meets Da Booda refix)
7. "What's It Gonna Be" (video)

UK CD2

1. "What's It Gonna Be" (Agent X Re-rub edit)
2. "What's It Gonna Be" (Agent X Re-rub club mix)

UK 12-inch single

1. "What's It Gonna Be" (Agent X Re-rub club mix)
2. "What's It Gonna Be" (Thomas Gold remix)
3. "What's It Gonna Be" (Jamie Duggan Meets Da Booda refix)
4. "What's It Gonna Be" (Jason Herd's Mo'funk remix)

== Charts ==
=== Weekly charts ===
| Chart (2008) | Peak position |
|---|---|
| Europe (Eurochart Hot 100) | 8 |
| Netherlands (Dutch Top 40) | 33 |
| Netherlands (Single Top 100) | 34 |
| Scottish Singles Sales (Official Charts) | 3 |
| UK Singles (Official Charts) | 2 |
| UK Dance (Official Charts) | 1 |

=== Year-end charts ===
| Chart (2008) | Position |
|---|---|
| UK Singles (OCC) | 29 |

== Certifications ==
| Region | Certification | Certified units/sales |
|---|---|---|
| United Kingdom (BPI) | Platinum | 600,000^{‡} |
^{‡} Sales+streaming figures based on certification alone.
