= Heartbroken (T2 song) =

2007 single by T2

Single by T2 featuring Jodie Aysha
- Released: 12 November 2007
- Genre: Bassline
- Length: 4:48 (original mix); 3:01 (radio edit)
- Label: All Around the World
- Songwriter: Jodie Aysha
- Producer: T2

T2 singles chronology
"Heartbroken" (2007)	"Gonna Be Mine" (2008)

Alternative cover

"Heartbroken" is a song by British record producer T2, released as his debut single. It was written by British singer Jodie Aysha, who also provides the vocals. The song spent three weeks at number two on the UK Singles Chart, behind Leona Lewis's "Bleeding Love". As of 2013, "Heartbroken" was the most requested song ever on BBC Radio 1.

The song was later rewritten to support boxer Ricky Hatton in his match against Floyd Mayweather. It was also sampled by DJ Khaled and Drake on their 2017 song "To the Max", and Digga D and ArrDee on their 2021 song "Wasted".

== Background ==
Jodie Aysha wrote the lyrics to "Heartbroken" in 2004, aged 14, inspired by her sister's break-up with her boyfriend. After meeting T2 later that year, Aysha recorded the vocals for "Heartbroken" at his apartment in Leeds and In 2006, he remixed them in the style of bassline, a genre similar to UK garage which was popular in Yorkshire at the time.

Despite winning a lawsuit over unpaid royalties, Aysha told the Metro in 2026 that she was still owed £100,000.

== Music video ==
The music video features cameos by footballers Micah Richards, who picks T2 up from his house in a Range Rover, and Anton Ferdinand, who hangs out with Richards in a bar.

== Track listings ==
Track #	Title	Length
CD single / digital download EP 1
1	Radio Edit	3:01
2	Extended Mix	6:37
3	WAWA Club Mix	7:52
4	Thomas Gold Mix	7:41
5	Wideboys London Mix	6:17
6	WAWA Radio Edit	3:19
7	Music Video	3:01
Digital download EP 2
1	Radio Edit	3:01
2	Extended Mix	6:37
3	Filthy Rich Mix	
4	Matic Pro Mix	
5	Wideboys Up Norf Mix	
Digital download EP 3 (iTunes exclusive)
1	Radio Edit	3:01
2	Wideboys Radio Edit	
3	Filthy Rich Mix	
4	Original Mix	4:48
5	WAWA Dub Mix	
12" vinyl single
	Side A	
1	Extended Club Mix	
2	WAWA Club Mix	
	Side B	
1	Wideboys London Mix	
2	Wideboys Up Norf Mix	

== Charts ==
=== Weekly charts ===
Chart (2007–2008)	Peak position
Belgium (Ultratip Bubbling Under Flanders)	4
Europe (Eurochart Hot 100)	6
Ireland (IRMA)	17
Scottish Singles Sales (Official Charts)	9
UK Singles (Official Charts)	2
UK Dance (Official Charts)	1

=== Year-end charts ===
Chart (2007)	Position
UK Singles (OCC)	37

Chart (2008)	Position
Europe (Eurochart Hot 100)	96
UK Singles (OCC)	115

== Certifications ==
Region	Certification	Certified units/sales
United Kingdom (BPI)	Platinum	600,000^{‡}
^{‡} Sales+streaming figures based on certification alone.
