= Jodie Aysha =

English singer and songwriter (born 1988)

- Born: Jodie Aysha Henderson; 22 November 1988 (age 37); Leeds, England
- Genres: R&B, electro house, pop, bassline
- Occupations: Singer, songwriter
- Instruments: Vocals, keys
- Label: Universal Music Group

Jodie Aysha (born Jodie Aysha Henderson; 22 November 1988 in Leeds, England) is an English singer and songwriter.

== Career ==
Aysha had success at the age of 18, when her song "Heartbroken", written when she was 14, was remixed by producer T2. The song was about her older sister's heartbreak at the time. "Heartbroken" reached number 2 on the UK Singles Chart, held off the top spot by The X Factor winner Leona Lewis. It remained at the number 2 spot for three weeks and enjoyed 14 weeks in the Top 40.

Despite winning a lawsuit over unpaid royalties, Aysha told the Metro in 2026 that she was still owed £100,000.

== Discography ==
=== Singles ===
Year	Title	Peak chart positions					Certifications
Year	Title	UK	UK Dance	UK Y/E	IRE Dance	IRE	Certifications
2007	"Heartbroken" (T2 featuring Jodie Aysha)	2	1	37	1	17	BPI: Platinum
2009	"Yes I Will"	—	—	—	—	—	
2011	UK Refixxxs EP	—	—	—	—	—	
2012	"It's Over (Can't Get My Love)" (feat. Bassmonkeys)	—	—	—	—	—	
