= Bassline (music genre) =

Music genre

- Stylistic origins: Speed garage; house; contemporary R&B
- Cultural origins: Early 2000s, Sheffield, South Yorkshire, UK
- Typical instruments: Turntables; drum machines; sequencer; synthesizer; samplers; personal computer

Other topics
- Bouncy techno; Bass music

Bassline (sometimes referred to as bassline house or 4x4 or niche) is a genre of electronic dance music that originated in South Yorkshire in the early 2000s. Stylistically it comprises a four-to-the-floor beat with a tempo of around 135–142 beats per minute and a heavy bass, similar to speed garage, with chopped up R&B and Pop vocal samples and a pop music aesthetic.

Particularly in the scene's early days, the most prominent bassline club was Sheffield's Niche Nightclub, which became the centre of controversy due to a police raid which resulted in the club's closure in 2005.

== Characteristics ==
Bassline generally places a strong emphasis on bass, with intricate basslines (often multiple and interweaving) characteristic of the genre. Bassline tracks typically use a four-to-the-floor beat. The music may be purely instrumental or may feature vocals similar to those in UK garage, especially sped-up female R&B vocals, or samples of vocals from grime tracks. By 2007, it had become common for people to MC over bassline, and to feature more dubstep and grime influences.

Most songs are around 135 to 142 bpm, faster than most garage and around the same tempo as most grime and dubstep. Bassline often embraces pop music aesthetics, and has a euphoric, exuberant quality similar to that of earlier British rave music.

DJs, producers and distributors describe bassline as related to house music and UK garage, but ultimately a distinct genre. Producer T2 maintains that while bassline and UK garage share a common origin in house music, they are different sounds. Similarly, major bassline distributor and DJ Mystic Matt describes bassline as having a similar rhythm to UK garage, but says the strong emphasis on bass makes it a separate genre.

=== Early bassline house ===
Bassline grew from the sound popular in nightclubs in Sheffield during the late 1990s, in particular Sheffield's Niche nightclub, which played speed garage mixed with melodic vocal house. According to Steve Baxendale, owner of Niche, the club's DJs began to take the vocals out of speed garage and house music, and then pumped up the bass, from around 1997. The changes in the style of music at Niche led to a change from a predominantly white crowd to a predominantly Black British crowd.

This style of music spread across South Yorkshire and West Yorkshire, then to Manchester, Nottingham and the West Midlands, also becoming popular in venues such as Casa Loco in Leeds and Boilerhouse in Bradford. There are local variations in bassline music, with a "darker" style more popular in Sheffield and Manchester, It being mixed with organ house popular in West Yorkshire, while local scenes in cities such as Birmingham and Nottingham favoured a more upbeat style.

Early bassline shares more similarities with its predecessor speed garage than the style that began to emerge in the latter half of the 2000s, with many people still referring to bassline releases from the early 2000s as speed garage. While the four-to-the-floor style of speed garage retained popularity in Yorkshire and the Midlands, in London it had declined due to the rise of 2-step garage and grime, which led to Northern and Midlands DJs needing to produce their own records. This resulted in new distributors specialising in bassline, such as Reflective Records in Sheffield, Jump Records and Ecko Records in Birmingham, and Northern Line in London.

Often, different "organ" and "bass" mixes of a track appeared on the same record, drawing on the genre's different musical influences. The bass or "B-Line" mix would be more influenced by speed garage, featuring a synthesised, low-frequency oscillation bassline, known as a "warp" or "reese". The organ track would instead feature sampled Korg M1-style organ leads, influenced by the house music of the 1990s.

=== 4x4 ===
Towards the end of the 2000s, a new wave of younger, Yorkshire-based producers such as TS7, Service Crew, Danny Bond and others, coupled with the rise of digital audio workstations, reduced the use of drum machine samples and old sampled bass lines, which took bassline along a different path. This style started to be called 4x4, moving further away from the original speed garage sound, but still retaining the core elements such as the warping bass and female vocals.

In general, bassline remained fairly underground and was mostly only popular in the North and Midlands, and releases often never went beyond a 12" vinyl EP, or obscure CD mixes and compilations. Eventually, 4x4 gained popularity in the pop charts, ostensibly because it appealed across genders, while grime and dubstep drew predominantly male followings at the time.

== History ==
=== Niche Nightclub ===
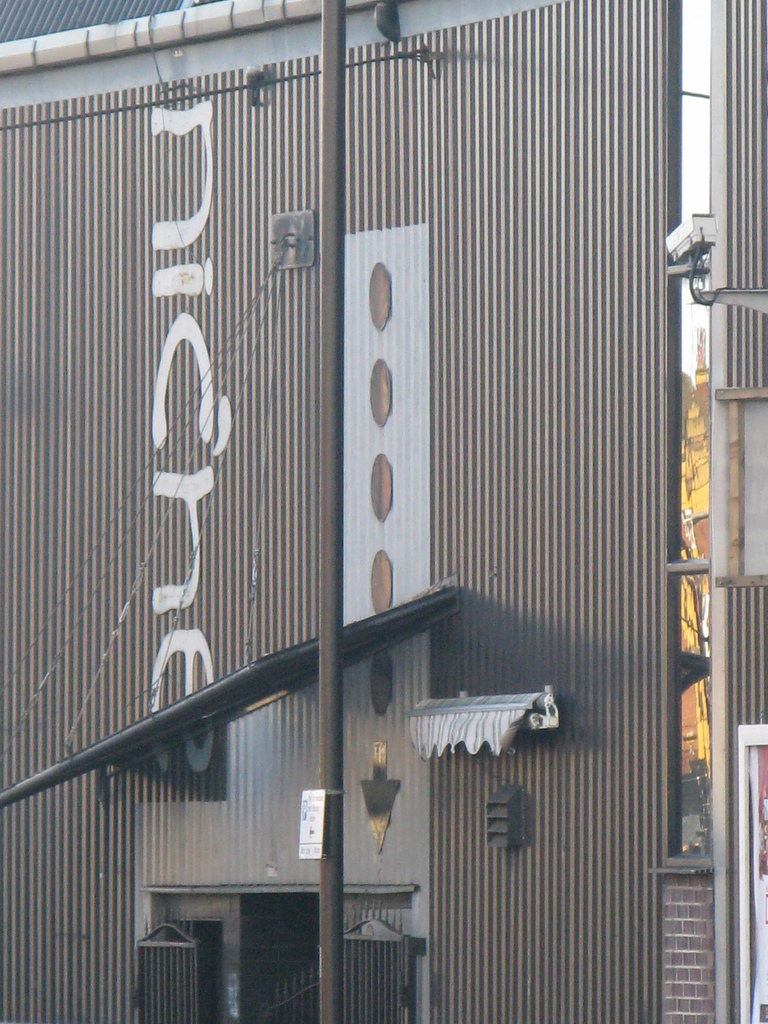
Niche's closed Sidney Street building in 2008

In 1992, Steve Baxendale opened Niche Nightclub in an abandoned warehouse on Sheffield's Sidney Street as an underground music venue, playing house music and later speed garage. The club was subjected to frequent raids by South Yorkshire Police throughout the 90s and early 2000s. As the bassline scene evolved, and Niche's popularity with it, the name of the club became synonymous with the genre.

In November 2005, the club was stormed by 300 officers in a raid named "Operation Repatriation", and closed, despite a lack of charges against the club's owners. According to Steve Baxendale, Sheffield's police force told him they targeted the venue due to the heavy drug use on the premises, although he believed it was because the police thought it brought Black gang violence to the city. Sheffield's police force have stated "the only gun crime related to nightlife in Sheffield has been with bassline". Baxendale said the controversy resulting from Operation Repatriation increased the popularity of the genre.

After Niche's closure, Club Vibe was opened by Steve Baxendale on Sheffield's Charter Row, with an agreement with South Yorkshire Police not to use the name Niche. DJs were restricted to playing classic bassline house and vocal tracks; 4x4 productions were banned. High levels of security were eventually relaxed in 2009, and the Vibe premises were expanded and renamed to Niche.

After a stabbing occurred outside the club in 2010, a local court forced the club to require membership cards, and the excessive restrictions governing bassline events eventually caused the club's permanent closure. Niche's DJs attempted to re-open the club at its original location on Sidney Street multiple times, but these proposals were opposed by Sheffield City Council and South Yorkshire Police. The original Niche building was ultimately scheduled for demolition in 2016.

=== Emergence into the mainstream ===
Bassline entered the mainstream with the release of Leeds producer T2's single "Heartbroken", featuring vocals by Jodie Aysha, on All Around the World. The track received significant airplay on UK radio stations and reached number 2 in the UK Singles Chart.

"Heartbroken" also attracted international attention, entering the music charts in several other countries and becoming popular on the club circuit. In December 2007, a reworked version of "Heartbroken" (renamed "Jawbroken"), created in aid of Ricky Hatton's world title fight against Floyd Mayweather, was selected as warm-up music for the fight.

After T2's success, H "Two" O released their single featuring vocal group Platnum, "What's It Gonna Be" which reached number 7 in the national charts on downloads alone, rising to number 2 the following week, where it remained for the next 3 weeks. Later in the year, one of London's leading bassline producers, Delinquent, signed a deal with All Around The World for another national release, "My Destiny".

Tony Portelli of M.I.RAW Recordings signed DJ Q (BBC Radio 1Xtra DJ) and MC Bonez to Ministry of Sound for the nationwide release of their single "You Wot!". It was available for download from 14 July 2008, with physical formats released on 21 July. The video for the single received airplay on mainstream TV music stations such as MTV Base. 23 Deluxe also released their single "Show Me Happiness" which reached number 2 in the BBC Radio 1 Dance Singles Chart. "Daddy O"—a song by Wideboys reached number 32 on the 2008 UK singles chart.

=== Decline ===
After its mainstream success through the mid to late 2000s, bassline began to enter a stage of commercial decline. This was mainly driven by the genre no longer having a presence in nightclubs.

At this point, DJs started to combine elements from older 2-step and UK garage tracks. Artists like 1st Born, Mr Virgo, J69, J.G, Freddo, TRC and DJ Q pioneered the new sound which called upon more highly swung beats instead of the classic 4x4 drums that were used in old school bassline tracks. The music at this time was mainly championed by DJ Q via his weekly spot on BBC Radio 1Xtra.

By 2012, bassline was mostly underground again, but the rise of "UK bass", an umbrella category covering multiple genres, allowed bassline to be played alongside house music and grime.

=== Resurgence ===
By 2015, although nightclub owners were still unwilling to host events, the warehouse and rave culture in the North of England led to a resurgence in the bassline sound and party culture. By the late 2010s, bassline had regained some of its earlier popularity due to acts like Darkzy, Holy Goof and Skepsis, and events like the Bassfest festival.

On 28 January 2017, Niche reopened temporarily, this time at Wicker Arch, the site of the former Arch 9 club, in Sheffield. The organisers continued to run irregular reunion events into the 2020s.

In the early 2020s, social media played a large part in expanding the audience for bassline, as did the use of bassline by artists such as Jorja Smith and PinkPantheress. In March 2021, Bradford-based group Bad Boy Chiller Crew, whose comedic YouTube videos had become popular across age groups, released their track "Don't You Worry About Me", which entered the UK Top 40 Singles Chart. In November, they were the subject of a reality series on ITV. In 2022, their track "BMW" reached number seven in the UK Top 10.

In April 2025, Redditch-based DJ and producer Denon Reed's track "I Need To Know", originally released the previous September and peaking at number 49 on the UK singles charts, was re-released with guest artists Dizzee Rascal, Silky, MIST and KAV. By May, it had entered the UK Top 40 Singles Chart.

In July 2025, Denon Reed's single "Let Him Go" reached number 36, and received around 6 million Spotify streams in a month. He released a remix in late August, featuring Tinie Tempah and Bugzy Malone. Reed subsequently launched his own baseline night, Cru2, which grew from audiences of less than 100 in 2023 to over 5,000 in September 2025. He is also involved in the Sound of Bassline festival and organises the Cru2 Tenerife festival in Tenerife.

In November 2025, nightclub Niche hosted its special 30th anniversary party.

== Responses ==
The popularity of bassline during the 2000s has sometimes been attributed, in part, to its appeal across genders, with female vocal artists and a focus on love and relationships thought to appeal to women more than grime or dubstep. In The Guardian, John McDonnell said bassline became a mainstream successor to UK garage in a way grime hadn't been able to, in part due to its "girl-friendly tunes". Simon Reynolds, who lamented the late emergence of bassline into the mainstream, described the genre as "the drastic pendulum swing from yang to yin, testosterone to oestrogen" in response to grime (itself sometimes said to he a response to late-90s 2-step).

== See also ==
- List of electronic music genres
