= H "Two" O =

English musical duo

- Origin: Leicester, England
- Genres: UK garage, bassline
- Years active: 2008–present
- Label: Hard2Beat
- Members: Solution; Oz

H "Two" O are an English, Leicester based garage and bassline duo, consisting of Solution and Oz. The name H "Two" O is a reference to the name of the radio station where the pair first met before they started producing music themselves.

The duo are best known for their single "What's It Gonna Be", which reached number two on the UK Singles Chart in February 2008, and sold over 43,000 copies. The single, featuring vocal trio Platnum, originally charted at number seven, before climbing to the number two position, where it remained for three weeks.

H "Two" O were resident DJs throughout 2008 at the Es Paradis club in San Antonio, Ibiza, as well as DJing around Europe; during the year, they also performed in other dance music holiday destinations, including Ayia Napa, Kavos, Malia and Marbella.

In January 2009, H "Two" O mixed one of the CDs on the second Ministry of Sound bassline album, The Sound of Bassline 2.

After a short break, H "Two" O returned with a new sound in 2015, remixing for Tinchy Stryder and M.O and releasing their first new track "Need You More" on Tough Love's Get Twisted record label.

== Discography ==
=== Singles ===
Title	Year	Peak chart positions						Certifications	Album
Title	Year	UK	UK Dance	EUR	IRE	NED	SCO	Certifications	Album
"What's It Gonna Be" (featuring Platnum)	2008	2	1	8	6	34	3	BPI: Platinum	Non-album single
"—" denotes items that did not chart or were not released in that territory.
