= T2 (producer) =

British music producer (born 1988)

- Also known as: T2
- Born: Tafadzwa Tawonezvi; May 1988 (age 37)
- Origin: Ruwa, Zimbabwe
- Genres: Bassline, house
- Occupations: Producer, DJ
- Years active: 2007–present

T2 (born Tafadzwa Tawonezvi; born May 1988) is a British record producer. His single "Heartbroken", featuring Jodie Aysha, hit No. 2 on the UK Singles Chart and was certified platinum by the BPI in 2022. T2 rewrote the lyrics of the tune late in 2007, in support of Ricky Hatton's boxing match against Floyd Mayweather. In 2008, T2 teamed up with Addictive to release "Gonna Be Mine". He has also worked with Dizzee Rascal, Pixie Lott, Craig David, Addictive, Gia and Rebecca Ferguson.

== Discography ==
Title	Year
"The Monster Dubz"	2007
"Heartbroken"	2007
"Gonna Be Mine"	2008
"Butterflies"	2008
"Come Over"	2009
"Nothing's Real But Love"	2012
"Piece of Me"	2017
"Emotions"	2018
