= August Alsina discography =

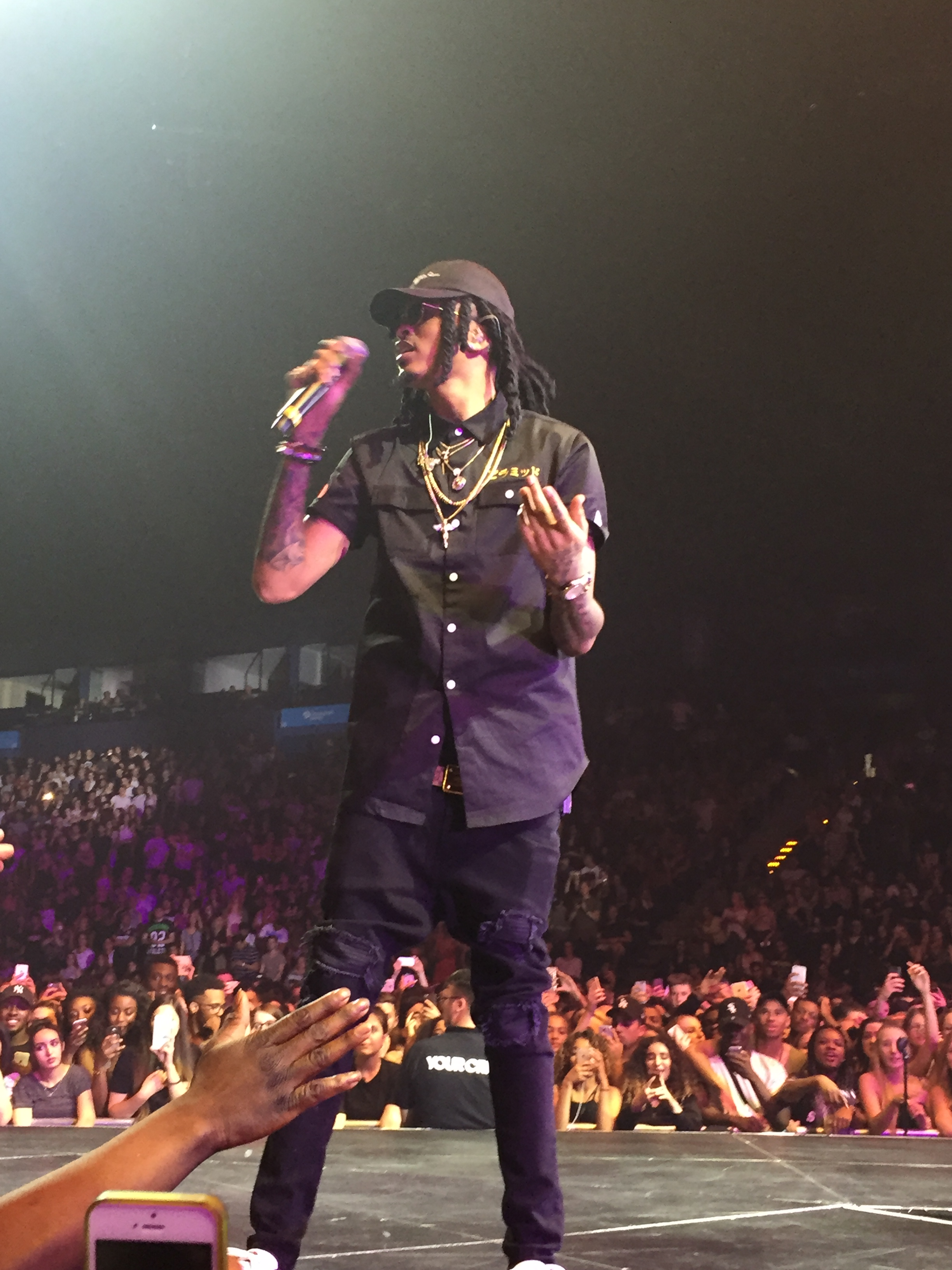
- Alsina performing in Hamburg in 2016.
- Studio albums: 4
- EPs: 2
- Singles: 30
- Mixtapes: 5

The discography of American singer August Alsina consists of four studio albums, two extended plays, five mixtapes and thirty singles (including eight as a featured artist).

== Albums ==
=== Studio albums ===
List of albums, with selected chart positions
Title	Album details	Peak chart positions				Certifications
Title	Album details	US	US R&B/HH	US R&B	UK R&B	Certifications
Testimony	Released: April 15, 2014; Label: Def Jam; Format: CD, digital download	2	1	1	10	RIAA: Platinum
This Thing Called Life	Released: December 11, 2015; Label: Def Jam; Format: CD, digital download	14	2	2	22	
The Product III: State of Emergency	Released: June 26, 2020; Label: Shake the World, Empire Distribution; Format: CD, digital download, streaming	48	4	—	—	
Myself	Released: March 10, 2023; Label: Shake the World, Empire Distribution; Format: Digital download, streaming	—	—	—	—	
"—" denotes a recording that did not chart.

=== Mixtapes ===
List of mixtapes with selected details
Title	Album details
Untitled	Released: October 11, 2011; Hosted by Indy Tapes
The Product	Released: April 15, 2012; Hosted by DJ Scream
August Alsina University	Released: August 28, 2012; Hosted by Greg Street
Throwback	Released: September 3, 2012; Hosted by Wild Wayne
The Product 2	Released: May 6, 2013; Hosted by DJ Drama

== Extended plays ==
List of EPs, with selected chart positions
Title	EP details	Peak chart positions		
Title	EP details	US	US R&B/HH	US R&B
Downtown: Life Under the Gun	Released: August 20, 2013; Label: Radio Killa, Def Jam; Format: CD, digital download	68	14	5
Forever and a Day	Released: February 14, 2019; Label: Shake the World; Format: Digital download	—	—	—

== Singles ==
=== As lead artist ===
List of singles as lead artist, with selected chart positions and certifications, showing year released and album name
Title	Year	Peak chart positions				Certifications	Album
Title	Year	US	US Bub.	US R&B/HH	US R&B	Certifications	Album
"I Luv This Shit" (featuring Trinidad James)	2013	48	—	13	4	RIAA: 2× Platinum	Downtown: Life Under the Gun and Testimony
"Ghetto" (featuring Rich Homie Quan)	2013	—	15	37	19	RIAA: Gold	Downtown: Life Under the Gun and Testimony
"Numb" (featuring B.o.B and Yo Gotti)	2013	—	22	38	16	RIAA: Gold	Testimony
"Make It Home" (featuring Young Jeezy)	2014	—	—	51	22	RIAA: Gold	Testimony
"Kissin' on My Tattoos"	2014	—	—	—	23	RIAA: Gold	Testimony
"No Love (Remix)" (featuring Nicki Minaj)	2014	69	—	17	6	RIAA: 2× Platinum	Testimony
"Hip-Hop"	2015	—	—	—	—		This Thing Called Life
"Why I Do It" (featuring Lil Wayne)	2015	—	—	—	—		This Thing Called Life
"Song Cry"	2015	—	—	—	20	RIAA: Gold	This Thing Called Life
"Drugs"	2017	—	—	—	—		Non-album singles
"Wait"	2017	—	—	—	—		Non-album singles
"Lonely"	2017	—	—	—	—		Non-album singles
"Don't Matter"	2017	—	—	—	—		Non-album singles
"Wouldn't Leave"	2018	—	—	—	—		Non-album singles
"Like You Love Me"	2018	—	—	—	—		Non-album singles
"Today"	2019	—	—	—	—		The Product III: stateofEMERGEncy
"Nola"	2020	—	—	—	—		The Product III: stateofEMERGEncy
"Rounds"	2020	—	—	—	—		The Product III: stateofEMERGEncy
"Entanglements" (with Rick Ross)	2020	—	15	—	7		Non-album single
"Pretty"	2021	—	—	—	—		The Product III: stateofEMERGEncy
"—" denotes a recording that did not chart or was not released in that territory.

=== As featured artist ===
List of singles as featured artist, with selected chart positions and certifications, showing year released and album name
Title	Year	Peak chart positions			Certifications	Album
Title	Year	US	US R&B/HH	US R&B	Certifications	Album
"Down On Your Luck" (Sage the Gemini featuring August Alsina)	2014	—	—	—		Remember Me
"Rich" (Kirko Bangz featuring August Alsina)	2014	105	37	—		Non-album single
"Hold You Down" (DJ Khaled featuring Chris Brown, August Alsina, Future, and Jeremih)	2014	39	10	4	RIAA: Gold	I Changed a Lot
"One More Shot" (Stalley featuring Rick Ross and August Alsina)	2014	—	—	—		Ohio
"I Don't Get Tired" (Kevin Gates featuring August Alsina)	2014	90	30	—	RIAA: 2× Platinum	Luca Brasi 2
"Bottom of the Bottle" (Currensy featuring August Alsina and Lil Wayne)	2015	97	29	—		Canal Street Confidential
"Gold Slugs" (DJ Khaled featuring Chris Brown, August Alsina, and Fetty Wap)	2015	—	49	12	RIAA: Gold	I Changed a Lot
"Do You Mind" (DJ Khaled featuring Nicki Minaj, Chris Brown, August Alsina, Jeremih, Future, and Rick Ross)	2016	27	9	8	RIAA: 3× Platinum	Major Key
"—" denotes a recording that did not chart or was not released in that territory.

== Guest appearances ==
List of non-single guest appearances, with other performing artists, showing year released and album name
Title	Year	Other artist(s)	Album
"Taking You Home"	2012	Lloyd, Roscoe Dash	none
"Swimming Pools (Remix)"	2012	Lloyd	none
"Rear View"	2013	Flo Rida	none
"Rain Down (Remix)"	2013	Kirko Bangz	
"We Just Came to Party"	2014	Kid Ink	My Own Lane
"V.S.O.P. (Remix)"	2014	K. Michelle	none
"Diamonds"	2014	Que	Can You Dig It?
"Fuck the World"	2014	Young Jeezy	Seen It All: The Autobiography
"She's a Keeper"	2014	Snootie Wild, Yo Gotti	Go Mode
"On Demand"	2014	Keyshia Cole, Wale	Point of No Return
"Jump"	2014	Plies	none
"Made for This"	2015	Problem	OT (Outta Town)
"Ms Mary Mack"	2015	Juicy J, Lil Wayne	100% Juice
"My Nigga"	2015	Meek Mill	Dreams Worth More Than Money
"Planes (Remix)"	2015	Jeremih, J. Cole	none
"She Wanna Fuck"	2015	Rick Ross	Black Dollar
"Back to Sleep (Remix)"	2016	Chris Brown, Trey Songz, Miguel	none
"Onyx"	2016	DJ Drama, Trey Songz, Ty Dolla Sign	Quality Street Music 2
"Been a Minute"	2017	Sevyn Streeter	Girl Disrupted

== Music videos ==
List of music videos as a main performer
Year	Title	Director
2013	"I Luv This Shit" (featuring Trinidad James)	Motion Family
2013	"Ghetto" (featuring Rich Homie Quan)	Payne Lindsey
2013	"Numb" (featuring B.o.B and Yo Gotti)	Payne Lindsey
2014	"Make It Home" (featuring Young Jeezy)	Payne Lindsey
2014	"Get Ya Money" (featuring Fabolous)	Payne Lindsey
2014	"Benediction" (featuring Rick Ross)	Payne Lindsey
2014	"No Love" (featuring Nicki Minaj)	Benny Boom
2015	"Hip Hop"	Payne Lindsey
2015	"Why I Do It" (featuring Lil Wayne)	Payne Lindsey
2015	"Song Cry"	Payne Lindsey
2017	"Drugs"	Alsina and Amber Gray
2017	"Wait"	Ninedy 92*
2017	"Lonely"	Amber Gray
2018	"Wouldn't Leave"	August Alsina & Christopher Scholar
2018	"Like You Love Me"	August Alsina
2019	"Nunya"	none
2019	"Footsteps"	none
2020	"NOLA"	August Alsina
2020	"Rounds"	Unfortunately
2020	"Entangelements" (with Rick Ross)	Riley Robbins
2021	"Pretty"	Megan Gamez
2023	"Lied To You"	MarkMark
2023	"Myself"	MarkMark
