= ARTZ (rapper) =

American rapper

- Born: Raymond Allende; July 2, 1990 (age 35)
- Other names: Anakin ARTZ
- Occupations: singer; songwriter
- Website: rejectdreams.com

Raymond Allende (born July 2, 1990), known professionally as ARTZ (previously Anakin ARTZ), is an American rapper, songwriter, and recording artist, event and art curator, from Brooklyn, New York. He is known for his song "off-white", and NFTs artwork. He is the owner and founder of record label and media company, RejectDreams.

== Personal life ==
Raymond Allende was born on July 2, 1990, and grew up in East New York. At the age of 18, he was hit by a stray bullet.

== Career ==
=== Music ===
At the age 15, ARTZ started his career with recording his first song, which was released in his first full-length project, “Established 1990”. He has collaborated with notable artists such as Busta Rhymes, Pop Smoke,.

In January 2021, his song “Off White” charted 8th on Apple Music, with his extended play “I love Lucy’s” trending and appearing on the main page of the iTunes for weeks. Moreover, his work “Fiona Apple” made it to “The New York” playlist on iTunes. During this time, he made national and international tours, including to Canada, Europe and the UK, and his works surpassed half a billion streams.

His work has been placed on rotation by major radio stations, such as “November” and “Remember” by Pakistani national radio stations, and "The Force" by New York's radio station Hot 97 and Z100, and last fm.

==== Discography ====
Albums
Year	Name	Tracks	Notes
2019	No Sleep: 25/8	12	
2019	No Sleep: The Sex Playlist	9	
2020	I Love Lucy's	7	
2020	I Love Lucy's Deluxe	16	
2022	Alone in Metaverse	8	featuring Styles P and Trinidad James

Singles and EPs
Year	Name	Notes	Reference
2022	Chanel Pearls		
2022	The Race Vs The Ride		
2022	Keeping Receipt$	ft. Trinidad James	
2021	You Ain’t Gang		
2021	Metta World Peace		
2021	My Son	ft. Brndn & Smoke DZA	
2021	Fvck The Neighbors		
2020	Off-White		
2020	Ice Water		
2020	The BQE		
2020	Leo’s Gift		
2020	Day Of The Dead		
2020	No Love		
2019	Automatic		
2017	The Force		
2015	November	ft. Ari Lennox	
2015	King of the Sky	feat. Rena1ssance & DuckWrth	

==== Mixtapes ====
- Dark Matter
