= No Love (August Alsina song) =

2014 song by August Alsina

Single by August Alsina featuring Nicki Minaj

from the album Testimony
- Released: April 15, 2014 (original album track); August 5, 2014 (remix single)
- Recorded: 2013 (album); 2014 (remix)
- Genre: R&B; hip hop
- Length: 4:03; 4:36 (remix)
- Label: Def Jam Recordings (a division of UMG)
- Songwriters: August Alsina; Christopher Gholson; Maurice Wade; Lucky Daye
- Producers: The Exclusives; Drumma Boy

August Alsina featuring Nicki Minaj singles chronology
"Hold You Down" (2014)	"No Love" (2014)	"One More Shot" (2014)

Nicki Minaj singles chronology
"Anaconda" (2014)	"No Love (Remix)" (2014)	"Low" (2014)

Music video
- "August Alsina - No Love (Remix) ft. Nicki Minaj"

"No Love" is a song by American singer-songwriter August Alsina, originally released as a track from his album Testimony on April 15, 2014. It was later remixed with rapper Nicki Minaj, which aired on urban contemporary radio on July 29, 2014, before being released on August 5 as a single. It was certified double Platinum by the Recording Industry Association of America (RIAA) on April 21, 2021.

== Music video ==
The video for remix was released on September 15, 2014, directed by Benny Boom.

== Charts ==
=== Weekly charts ===
Chart (2014)	Peak position
US Billboard Hot 100	69

=== Year-end charts ===
Chart (2014)	Position
US Hot R&B/Hip-Hop Songs (Billboard)	91

== Certifications ==
Region	Certification	Certified units/sales
Brazil (Pro-Música Brasil)	Gold	30,000^{‡}
United States (RIAA)	2× Platinum	2,000,000^{‡}
^{‡} Sales+streaming figures based on certification alone.
