= Gold Gang Records =

- Founded: 2012
- Founder: Trinidad James
- Distributor: Empire Distribution
- Genre: Various
- Country of origin: United States
- Location: Atlanta, Georgia

Gold Gang Records Inc. is an American record label founded in Atlanta, Georgia by rapper Trinidad James in 2012.

== History ==
James' debut single, "All Gold Everything", has charted on the Billboard Hot 100 and R&B/Hip Hop charts. It is taken from his debut mixtape, Don't Be S.A.F.E. (Sensitive As Fuck Everyday), originally released on July 31, 2012, and officially re-released with a music video on October 16, 2012. On December 13, 2012, it was announced that James had signed a joint venture with Def Jam Records for approximately $2 million. In January, Def Jam released Don't Be S.A.F.E to iTunes, which included the official remix of "All Gold Everything" featuring 2 Chainz, T.I, and Young Jeezy.

On August 6, 2013, he announced he would be releasing his second mixtape, 10 PC Mild, on August 13. After months of not releasing music, James announced that he had been dropped from Def Jam on August 1, 2014. He also stated that the album he planned to release on the label will now be released for free, and that producers and rappers who contributed to the project should not expect any compensation because he has "no money".

August 11, 2014, Trinidad James released a single with his recording artist 31, "No Excuses", which was new music since being dropped from Def Jam. On December 31, 2015, recording artist 31 released his mixtape, "Scale Tales" during a release party at the "Department Store" in Atlanta. As of April 1, 2015, "Scale Tales" has over 24,000 views on livemixtapes.com.

On January 8, 2015, Gold Gang Records recording artist 31 debuted his recording label Grammy Society along with his members Kwame, Greg Hadley, and High Defynition.

== Artists ==
None

=== Current acts ===
Act	Year signed	Albums under the label
Trinidad James	2012	5
31	2012	3
Cooper	2012	-
Jigastankdoodoo	2012	-
Jukesterdam	2012	-
Saucegod	2012	–
HugoJoe	2012	1
Spookfo	2012	-
Zo Richie	2012	1

== Discography ==
Artist	Album	Details
Trinidad James	Don't Be S.A.F.E. (released with Gold Gang and Def Jam)	Released: September 18, 2012; Chart position: #103 U.S.; RIAA certification: Gold
Trinidad James	10 PC Mild	Released: August 13, 2013
31	Scale Tales	Released: December 31, 2014
Trinidad James	The Wake Up EP	Released: January 3, 2015
Trinidad James	No One Is Safe	Released: January 20, 2015
Hugo Joe	Fashion Week EP	Released: February 6, 2015
Treybo	Treybo&Friends	Released: February 14, 2015
Trinidad James	Trips to Trinidad EP	Released: April 18, 2015

== See also ==
- List of record labels
