= The Product III: State of Emergency =

Studio album by August Alsina
- Released: June 26, 2020
- Recorded: 2019–20
- Studio: Shake the World Studios
- Genres: R&B; hip hop
- Length: 1:32:07
- Labels: Shake The World; Empire
- Producers: Amir Cuyler; Aubrey Robinson; August Alsina; Awaz Beatz; B Will; BLSSD; Cardiak; Carlos Cahee; Darvel Rankin; Dat Boi Beezo; Devon George; DJ Mustard; Gregory Reid; Hero SavesTheWorld; Insomniakz; Jean Baptiste Lamothe; Patrick Planer; Romano; Soundz; Tariq Beats; The Exclusives; Timothy Walls; Timur Saifullin

August Alsina chronology
This Thing Called Life (2015)	The Product III: State of Emergency (2020)	Myself (2023)

Singles from The Product III: State of Emergency
- 1. "Today" Released: December 6, 2019; 2. "NOLA" Released: June 21, 2020; 3. "Rounds" Released: July 17, 2020; 4. "Pretty" Released: March 4, 2021

The Product III: State of Emergency (stylized as The Product III: stateofEMERGEncy) is the third studio album by American singer and songwriter August Alsina. It was released on June 26, 2020, through his own label Shake the World and distributed by Empire. Production was handled by several record producers, including frequent collaborators the Exclusives, as well as Cardiak and Mustard. It features guest appearances from Darrel Walls, Juicy J, Lil Wayne, Tink and Yo Gotti. The album was led by single "Today", which was followed by "NOLA", and four promotional singles

The Product III: State of Emergency marks his first release since 2015's This Thing Called Life, also serving as the third installment in his The Product series, which debuted in 2012 and was followed by his breakout project, The Product II in 2013. The album is an R&B and hip hop record that lyrically discusses various hardships that the singer faced throughout his lifetime.

The album debuted at number 48 on the US Billboard 200, and at number 4 on the US Independent Albums chart. The Product III: State of Emergency was met with mixed reviews from music critics, who praised its personal songwriting, but criticized its production.

== Background and release ==
In July 2019, the singer shared that he'd been privately battling health issues and had momentarily lost the ability to walk. "I have a liver disease where my autoimmune system is fighting against itself" August Alsina said. "Reality is I'm sick all the time. I'd really like to talk about it and I'm not looking for anybody's sympathy. Don't treat me like I'm a f*cking cancer patient, because I'm not."

The singer has shared bits of his recovery via social media, and fans speculated a return for his music after his recovery ended. Alsina has given his listeners brief snippets of music through videos and Instagram stories over 2019, and on June 26, 2020 he announced that he was set to drop his forthcoming project The Product III: State of Emergency the next Friday.

The singer announced that the choice to make The Product III: State of Emergency a 27-track album came from the fact that it was inspired by Chris Brown's acclaimed 2017 album Heartbreak on a Full Moon, that inspired his third body of work for its length and for what the singer described as "the most honest and open songwriting possible". The singer announced that the album highlights "the struggle in my life, my upbringing as a crack baby, losing my father and sister, and becoming the guardian for my three nieces", as well as his battle with the auto-immune disease that affected him.

In describing the album, Alsina said,

The goal of this project is to expose myself through the art and to help others reveal their true selves. Go back into the past, bring it into the present and positively impact our future. I want to show the community that we’ve all had to overcome some type of obstacle. Some greater than others, but pain is pain...and pain and its threshold is subjective and different for each individual.

== Critical response ==
Professional ratings
Review scores
Source	Rating
AllMusic	2.5/5 stars
Complex	3/5 stars

Upon its release, the album was met with mixed reviews from music critics. Andy Kellman of AllMusic complimented its personal songwriting but found the production to be "repetitive" and "flat", he stated "Alsina might do well to be as bold with production choices as he is with his songwriting. He has been a sympathetic artist since his debut, but this contains some of his bravest lyrics yet" Cultural critic and media personality Joe Budden praised some of the songs but was dismissive of its length, saying in his review for Complex: "The album has his fair piece of good songs. But this is not Chris Brown, where your talents allow your forty-songs-project to be great from start to bottom. This album is just too ambitious for August Alsina".

== Track listing ==
Credits adapted from Tidal.

No.	Title	Writer(s)	Producer(s)	Length
1.	"NOLA"	August Alsina; Ralph Jeanty; Sean McMillion; Kyle Michael Stephon Morton	Jean Baptiste Lamothe	2:48
2.	"Today"	Alsina; Jeanty; McMillion; Amanda Jones	Jean Baptiste Lamothe	3:21
3.	"Rounds"	Alsina; Jeanty; McMillion; Kortney Leveringston	Ralph Jeanty; Sean McMillion; Aubrey Robinson	3:33
4.	"Lessons"	Alsina; Jeanty; McMillion; Jonathan Nash	Awaz Beatz; The Exclusives	3:55
5.	"Sincerely"	Alsina; Jeanty; McMillion; Maurice Davis	Devon George	4:31
6.	"Deliver Us" (featuring Darrel Walls)	Alsina; Jeanty; McMillion; Darrel Walls	Ralph Jeanty; Sean McMillion; August Alsina	4:54
7.	"RRR (Real Recognize Real)"	Alsina; Jeanty; McMillion; Nash	Carlos Cahee	2:55
8.	"Fly Far"	Alsina; Jeanty; McMillion; Davis; Travis Ladell Reed	Ralph Jeanty; Sean McMillion; Darvel Rankin; Timothy Walls	3:02
9.	"Feeling"	Alsina; Morton	Ralph Jeanty; Sean McMillion	3:21
10.	"Perfect Strangers"	Alsina; Jeanty; McMillion; Leveringston	Awaz Beatz; The Exclusives	3:27
11.	"Pretty"	Alsina; Jeanty; McMillion	August Alsina; The Exclusives	3:12
12.	"4Real"	Alsina; Jeanty; McMillion; Nash; Terrence Williams	Romano	2:46
13.	"Work to Do"	Alsina; Ellery McKinney; Wilbart McCoy III; Vedo	Cardiak; Tariq Beats	3:00
14.	"Be Good"	Alsina; Jeanty; McMillion; Williams; Mckenzie Lawson	Romano	2:47
15.	"Soon As I Walk In" (featuring Tink)	Alsina; Jeanty; McMillion; Trinity Home	Patrick Planer	4:07
16.	"Tonight"	Alsina; Jeanty; McMillion; Lawson	Awaz Beatz; The Exclusives	3:35
17.	"Longer"	Alsina; Jeanty; McMillion; Lawson	Romano	2:49
18.	"Sleeve"	Alsina; Jeanty; McMillion	August Alsina; The Exclusives	3:13
19.	"Chase"	Alsina; Jeanty; McMillion; Nash	Romano; Dat Boi Beezo	2:49
20.	"Brakes" (featuring Yo Gotti)	Alsina; Jeanty; McMillion; Jones; Mario Mims	Hero SavesTheWorld	3:16
21.	"Broken Rollie"	Alsina; Jeanty; McMillion; McKinney; Williams; Dwayne Alo; Sheldon Body Jr.; Tarik Deshayne Wright Jr.	Insomniakz; Soundz	2:56
22.	"If We Broke Up"	Alsina; Jeanty; McMillion; Leveringston; John Q Leech	B Will; The Exclusives	3:48
23.	"Ready"	Alsina	Romano; The Exclusives; Amir Cuyler; Gregory Reid	3:23
24.	"Bossin Up"	Alsina; Jeanty; McMillion; Leveringston	B Will; The Exclusives	3:41
25.	"Party Til"	Alsina; Jeanty; Dijon MacFarlane	DJ Mustard	3:34
26.	"Resent" (featuring Lil Wayne and Juicy J)	Alsina; Jeanty; McMillion; Dwayne Carter Jr.; Jordan Michael Houston	August Alsina; The Exclusives	4:05
27.	"Still Don't Know"	Alsina; Jeanty; McMillion; Jones	BLSSD	3:19
Total length:				1:32:07

== Notes ==
- "Soon As I Walk In" is a remix of "Soon As U Walk In" performed by Tink.

== Charts ==
Chart performance for The Product III: State of Emergency
Chart (2020)	Peak position
US Billboard 200	48
US Top R&B/Hip-Hop Albums (Billboard)	30
US Independent Albums (Billboard)	4
