= All Gold Everything =

Single by Trinidad James

from the album Don't Be S.A.F.E.
- Released: December 20, 2012
- Recorded: 2012
- Genre: Hip hop
- Length: 3:09
- Label: Def Jam
- Songwriter: Nicholas Williams
- Producer: Devon Gallaspy

Trinidad James singles chronology
| "All Gold Everything" (2012) | "I Luv This Shit" (2013) |

"All Gold Everything" is the debut single by American rapper Trinidad James. It was released on December 20, 2012, as the first single from his debut mixtape Don't Be S.A.F.E. (2012). The single has sold over 1,000,000 copies and was certified platinum by the RIAA.

== Background ==
The song earned Trinidad James a major record deal with Def Jam Recordings worth 2 million. Complex ranked the song #35 on the 50 best songs of 2012 list. The official remix was released on January 7, 2013, featuring fellow Atlanta rappers T.I., Young Jeezy and 2 Chainz. On February 14, 2013, Trinidad James performed the song on Late Night with Jimmy Fallon. The music video for the remix was filmed on January 31, 2013 and was released on February 27, 2013. "All Gold Everything" was interpolated in the 2014 song "Uptown Funk" by Mark Ronson featuring Bruno Mars. On June 24, 2015, it was reported that James earned over $150,000 in royalty earnings off of "Uptown Funk"'s interpolation.

== Critical reception ==
"All Gold Everything"
A sample of "All Gold Everything"

Pitchfork Media commented on the track by saying "If the heyday of disco had produced a rapper, it might have been Atlanta's Trinidad James. When he talks about gold-- he's obsessed with it-- it's not so much about status as it is about sheer flamboyance. 'I'm too fly/ You know this/ Let me give your ass a checklist', he raps on 'All Gold Everything', the letters slithering off his tongue around a slow, exaggerated ripple of a beat. The track comes from his mixtape Don't Be S.A.F.E., an excellent debut that toggles seamlessly between snaggle-toothed drug talk, flashy boasts and earnest self-deprecation."

== Music video ==
The music video shot in Atlanta, Georgia was directed by Motion Family and premiered on MTV Jams on November 18, 2012. As of November 2021, the music video has over 40 million views on YouTube.

== Charts and certifications ==
=== Weekly charts ===
| Chart (2012–13) | Peak position |
|---|---|
| US Billboard Hot 100 | 36 |
| US Hot R&B/Hip-Hop Songs (Billboard) | 9 |
| US Hot Rap Songs (Billboard) | 6 |
| US Rhythmic Airplay (Billboard) | 10 |

=== Year-end charts ===
Annual chart rankings
| Chart (2013) | Position |
|---|---|
| US Hot R&B/Hip-Hop Songs (Billboard) | 34 |
| US Rap Songs (Billboard) | 28 |
| US Streaming Songs (Billboard) | 75 |

=== Certifications ===
| Region | Certification | Certified units/sales |
|---|---|---|
| United States (RIAA) | Platinum | 1,000,000^{*} |
^{*} Sales figures based on certification alone.

== Release history ==
| Country | Date | Format | Label |
|---|---|---|---|
| United States | December 20, 2012 | Digital download | Def Jam |
