= Testimony (August Alsina album) =

Studio album by August Alsina
- Released: April 15, 2014
- Recorded: 2012–2014
- Genre: R&B
- Length: 59:21
- Label: Def Jam
- Producers: Henry "Noonie" Lee (exec.); Donald "D-Day" Albright (exec.); Karen Kwak (co-exec.); August Alsina; Cassius Jay; David Claxton; DJ Mustard; DJ Spinz; Drumma Boy; Dun Deal; Eric Hudson; John "$K" McGee; Jasper Cameron; Knucklehead; The BeatFreqz; The Featherstones; The Exclusives

August Alsina chronology
Downtown: Life Under the Gun (2013)	Testimony (2014)	This Thing Called Life (2015)

Singles from Testimony
- 1. "I Luv This Shit" Released: February 19, 2013; 2. "Ghetto" Released: December 9, 2013; 3. "Numb" Released: December 10, 2013; 4. "Make It Home" Released: January 15, 2014; 5. "Kissin' on My Tattoos" Released: April 1, 2014; 6. "No Love (Remix)" Released: July 29, 2014

Testimony is the debut studio album by American R&B singer August Alsina. It was released on April 15, 2014, by Def Jam Recordings. The album was supported by six singles: "I Luv This Shit" (previously released on his 2013 EP Downtown: Life Under the Gun), "Ghetto", "Numb", "Make It Home", "Kissin' on My Tattoos" and "No Love"; along with the release of his promotional single, "Benediction".

Upon its release, Testimony was met with positive reviews from music critics, who praised Alsina's introduction to the scenario of mainstream R&B music. The album debuted at number 2 on the Billboard 200, with first-week sales of 67,000 copies in the United States. The album features guest appearances from Chris Brown, Yo Gotti, B.o.B, Trey Songz and Def Jam label-mates Pusha T, Rick Ross, Fabolous, Jeezy and Trinidad James. “Song Cry” performed by August Alsina Written and backing vocal led by Artist singer/songwriter Rachel M Hannan (UK)

== Singles ==
On February 14, 2013, the music video was released for the lead single, "I Luv This Shit" featuring Trinidad James. The song was produced by Knucklehead. It was officially released for digital download on February 19, 2013. The song peaked at number 48 on the US Billboard Hot 100, and number 13 on the Billboard's Hot R&B/Hip-Hop Songs charts.

On December 9, 2013, the album's second single, "Ghetto" featuring Rich Homie Quan, was serviced to urban contemporary radio in the United States. Knucklehead also produced this track. It was officially released for digital download on February 11, 2014.

On December 2, 2013, the music video was released for "Numb" featuring B.o.B. and Yo Gotti. On December 10, 2013, "Numb" was released as the album's third single. The song was produced by DJ Mustard.

On January 15, 2014, the album's fourth single, "Make It Home" featuring Jeezy, was released for digital download. It was sent to US urban contemporary radio on March 3, 2014. On February 13, 2014, the music video was released for "Make It Home" featuring Jeezy. "Make It Home" was certified gold by the RIAA and topped the Bubbling Under R&B/Hip-Hop Singles chart later that year.

On April 1, 2014, the album's fifth single, "Kissin' on My Tattoos" was released. The song was produced by Jasper Cameron.

The album's sixth single was the remix to "No Love" featuring Nicki Minaj, which was serviced to urban adult contemporary radio in the United States on July 29, 2014.

=== Other songs ===
On April 15, 2014, the music video was released for "Grind & Pray / Get Ya Money" featuring Fabolous. On June 26, 2014, the music video was released for "FML" featuring Pusha T. On July 1, 2014, the music video was released for "Benediction" featuring Rick Ross; the video also features a cameo appearances from DJ Khaled.

== Promotion ==
To promote the album, Alsina began the Testimony Live tour in the United States on August 14, 2014.

== Critical response ==
Professional ratings
Aggregate scores
Source	Rating
Metacritic	79/100
Review scores
Source	Rating
AllMusic	4/5 stars
The New York Times	(positive)
Now	4/5 stars
Spin	7/10
XXL	3/5 (L)

Upon its release, Testimony was met with positive reviews from music critics. At Metacritic, which assigns a normalized rating out of 100 to reviews from critics, the album received an average score of 79 based on 5 reviews. Andy Kellman of AllMusic said, "This is a gratifying second step from one of the most exciting contemporary R&B artists to appear during the 2010s."

Erin Lowers of XXL gave the album an L rating, saying "Finding the balance between sex, love, and ratchet, Testimony is truly a testament to a new era in R&B that shifts safe lyrics to smooth street tales." Brandon Soderberg of Spin said, "Usually, in-the-pocket R&B does fine with middling MCs, but Testimony, powered by Alsina's insider-outsider personality – sensitive romantic with a crime-haunted past – doesn't need these big dumb lugs for cred, or even menace. Testimony brings rap's raw nerve detail to the sturdy slow jam, nullifying the need for nods to R&B of the "rap and bullshit" variety."

== Commercial performance ==
Testimony debuted at number two on the US Billboard 200 chart, selling 67,000 copies in its first week. This became Alsina's first US top-ten debut on the chart. In its second week, the album dropped to number five on the chart, selling an additional 20,000 copies. In its third week, the album dropped to number 18 on the chart, selling 12,000 more copies. In its fourth week, the album dropped to number 35 on the chart, selling 9,000 copies. As of November 2015, the album has sold 287,000 copies in the United States. On September 1, 2021, the album was certified platinum by the Recording Industry Association of America (RIAA) for combined sales and album-equivalent units of over one million units in the United States.

== Track listing ==
Standard edition
No.	Title	Writer(s)	Producer(s)	Length
1.	"Testify"	August Alsina; Samuel "Knucklehead" Irving III; Sean "Pen" McMillion; Ralph "Vintage" Jeanty	Knucklehead; Korner Keyz; The Exclusives^{[a]}	4:02
2.	"Make It Home" (featuring Jeezy)	Alsina; McMillion; Jeanty; William Featherstone; Christopher Featherstone; Matthew Featherstone; Justin Featherstone; Jay Jenkins	The Featherstones	4:31
3.	"Right There"	Alsina; Irving III; McMillion; Jeanty	Knucklehead; Cassius Jay; Alsina; The Exclusives^{[a]}	3:37
4.	"You Deserve"	Alsina; McMillion; Jeanty; Terius Nash; Skip Scarborough	The BeatFreqz; The Exclusives^{[a]}	4:02
5.	"No Love"	Alsina; Christopher Gholson; Onika Maraj	Drumma Boy; The Exclusives^{[a]}	4:03
6.	"Porn Star"	Alsina; Gary "DJ Spinz" Hill; John "$K" McGee; McMillion; Jeanty	DJ Spinz; McGee; The Exclusives^{[a]}	4:37
7.	"FML" (featuring Pusha T)	Alsina; Gholson; McMillion; Jeanty; Samuel "Sam Hook" Jean; Terrence Thornton	Drumma Boy; The Exclusives^{[a]}	3:37
8.	"Grind & Pray / Get Ya Money" (featuring Fabolous)	Alsina; Hill; David Cunningham; McMillion; Jeanty; John Jackson	"Grind & Pray" produced by Jasper Cameron "Get Ya Money" produced by DJ Spinz and Dun Deal	5:32
9.	"Ghetto" (featuring Yo Gotti)	Alsina; McMillion; Jeanty; Dequantes Lamar; Mario Sentell Giden Mims	Knucklehead; The Exclusives^{[a]}	3:59
10.	"Kissin' on My Tattoos"	Alsina; Jasper Cameron	Jasper Cameron; The Exclusives^{[a]}	4:11
11.	"Ah Yeah"	Alsina; David "D. Clax" Claxton	Claxton	2:35
12.	"Mama"	Alsina; McMillion; Jeanty	The Exclusives; Alsina	3:30
13.	"Benediction" (featuring Rick Ross)	Alsina; Eric Hudson; McMillion; Jeanty; Jean; William Roberts II	Hudson; The Exclusives^{[a]}	4:55
14.	"I Luv This Shit" (featuring Trinidad James) (Bonus Track)	Alsina; McMillion; Jeanty; Irving III; Christine Massa; Ashad Jordan; Nicholas Williams	Knucklehead; The Exclusives^{[a]}	4:27
15.	"Numb" (featuring B.o.B and Yo Gotti) (Bonus Track)	Alsina; Dijon McFarlane; McMillion; Jeanty; Bobby Simmons, Jr.; Mims	DJ Mustard; The Exclusives^{[a]}	4:14

Deluxe edition (bonus tracks)
No.	Title	Writer(s)	Producer(s)	Length
16.	"Grind & Pray (Extended version)"	Alsina; Cameron	Cameron	3:32
17.	"I Luv This Shit (Remix)" (featuring Trey Songz and Chris Brown)	Alsina; McMillion; Jeanty; Irving III; Massa; Tremaine Neverson; Christopher Brown	Knucklehead; The Exclusives^{[a]}	4:26

Best Buy deluxe edition (bonus track)
No.	Title	Writer(s)	Producer(s)	Length
18.	"Backseat"	Alsina; Kevin "Go Grizzly" Price	Go Grizzly	3:00

Notes

- ^{^a} signifies a vocal producer.

Sample credits

- "You Deserve" contains a sample from "Love Ballad" performed by L.T.D.

== Charts ==
=== Weekly charts ===
Chart (2014)	Peak position
UK Albums (OCC)	108
UK R&B Albums (Official Charts)	10
US Billboard 200	2
US Top R&B/Hip-Hop Albums (Billboard)	1

=== Year-end charts ===
Chart (2014)	Position
US Billboard 200	79
US Top R&B/Hip-Hop Albums (Billboard)	19
US Top R&B Albums (Billboard)	11

Chart (2015)	Position
US Top R&B/Hip-Hop Albums (Billboard)	80

== Certifications ==
Region	Certification	Certified units/sales
United States (RIAA)	Platinum	1,000,000^{‡}
^{‡} Sales+streaming figures based on certification alone.

== Release history ==
Region	Date	Label(s)
Australia	April 10, 2014	Universal Music
Austria	April 10, 2014	Universal Music
Belgium	April 10, 2014	Universal Music
Germany	April 10, 2014	Universal Music
France	April 10, 2014	Universal Music
Ireland	April 14, 2014	Island
United Kingdom	April 14, 2014	Virgin EMI
United States	April 15, 2014	Def Jam
Japan	April 29, 2014	Universal Music Japan
New Zealand	May 6, 2014	Universal Music
Finland	May 6, 2014	Universal Music
Hungary	May 6, 2014	Universal Music
Poland	May 11, 2014	Def Jam
Italy	May 27, 2014	Def Jam

== See also ==
- List of Billboard number-one R&B albums of 2014
