= This Thing Called Life =

Studio album by August Alsina
- Released: December 11, 2015
- Recorded: 2014–15
- Studios: Duck Off Studios, Atlanta, Georgia; Tree Sound Studios, Atlanta; Twelve Recording Studios, Atlanta
- Genres: R&B; hip hop
- Length: 56:23
- Label: Def Jam
- Producers: Knucklehead; Flippa; Hood Famous; Go Grizzly; JProof; B.A.M.; MelloTheProducer; The Exclusives; Polow da Don

August Alsina chronology
Testimony (2014)	This Thing Called Life (2015)	The Product III: State of Emergency (2020)

Singles from This Thing Called Life
- 1. "Hip Hop" Released: April 21, 2015; 2. "Why I Do It" Released: August 28, 2015; 3. "Song Cry" Released: October 28, 2015

This Thing Called Life is the second studio album by American R&B recording artist August Alsina. It was released on December 11, 2015, by Def Jam Recordings. The album was supported by five singles: "Hip Hop", "Why I Do It" featuring Lil Wayne, "Song Cry", plus two promotional singles "Been Around the World" featuring Chris Brown, and "Dreamer".

The album debuted at number 14 on the US Billboard 200, and received generally positive reviews from music critics.

== Singles ==
The album's lead single, "Hip Hop" was released on April 21, 2015. The song was produced by Knucklehead, who did the instrumental on Alsina's song "I Luv This Shit", which later became Alsina's most successful single to date. On June 28, 2015, the music video was released for "Hip-Hop", which premiered during the 2015's BET Awards.

The album's second single, "Why I Do It" was released on August 28, 2015. The song features guest vocals from American hip hop recording artist Lil Wayne, with the production that was handled by Soundz and the duo Rock City. The music video for "Why I Do It" featuring Lil Wayne, was released on September 17, 2015.

The album's third single, "Song Cry" was released on October 28, 2015. The song was produced by Brandon "B.A.M." Alexander. The music video for "Song Cry" was released on December 11, 2015.

The album's two promotional singles, "Been Around the World" featuring American singer Chris Brown and "Dreamer" were simultaneously released on December 3, 2015. Knucklehead also produced both tracks.

== Critical reception ==
Professional ratings
Review scores
Source	Rating
AllMusic	3.5/5 stars
HipHopDX	2.5/5 stars
Pitchfork	7.4/10
Rolling Stone	3.5/5 stars

This Thing Called Life received generally positive reviews from critics. Andy Kellman of Allmusic said that the album is "immersed in street life and its grim aftershocks". Trent Clark of HipHopDX in a mixed review said that the album "doesn't stand out with a sound of its own, but rather takes what's already been done better lately from more relevant R&B artists". Renato Pagnani of Pitchfork expressed a positive response, stating: "Alsina applies the tender, ruminative aspects of R&B to his street tales, and his second studio album solidifies his place amongst the upper echelon of modern-day R&B". Elias Leight of Rolling Stone said that the album is "a thuggy mixture of Chris Brown's X and Trey Songz' Anticipation II" stating that its sound "succeeded in fusing R&B and hip-hop".

== Commercial performance ==
This Thing Called Life debuted at number 14 on the US Billboard 200 chart, selling 41,000 copies in its first week of release.

== Track listing ==
No.	Title	Writer(s)	Producer(s)	Length
1.	"This Thing Called Life"	August Alsina; Carlos Cahee	August Alsina; Cahee	0:57
2.	"Job" (featuring Anthony Hamilton and Jadakiss)	Alsina; Ronald Colson; Jameel Roberts; Sean McMillion; Ralph Jeanty; Anthony Hamilton; Jason Phillips; Sampha Sisay	Flippa; JProof	4:14
3.	"Why I Do It" (featuring Lil Wayne)	Alsina; McMiilion; Jeanty; Candace Curry; Nicodemo Lalli; Keyiara Sallie; Go Grizzly; Kevin Price; Dwayne Carter, Jr.	Hood Famous The Prodducer; Go Grizzly	3:58
4.	"Hollywood"	Alsina; Samuel Irving III; Cahee; Curry; Jeanty; McMillion	Knucklehead	3:28
5.	"Hip Hop"	Alsina; Irving III; McMillion; Jeanty; Robert Reese; Erykah Badu; Vincent Brown; Keir Gist; Anthony Criss; Ernest Isley; Marvin Isley; O'Kelly Isley, Jr.; Ronald Isley; Rudolph Isley; Christopher Wallace; Robert Glasper	Knucklehead	3:29
6.	"Change"	Alsina; Irving III; Cahee; Jeanty; McMillion	Knucklehead	3:20
7.	"Dreamer"	Alsina; McMillion; Jeanty; Irving III	Knucklehead	4:46
8.	"Been Around the World" (featuring Chris Brown)	Alsina; McMillion; Irving III; Jeanty; Ian Devaney; Etterlene Jordan; Christopher Brown; Paul Hardcastle; Andrew Morris; Lisa Stansfield; Mark DeBarge	Knucklehead	3:22
9.	"First Time"	Alsina; Irving III; E. Isley; M. Isley; O. Isley; R. Isley; R. Isley; Jasper; McMillion; Jeanty; William Earl Collins; Gary Lee Cooper; George Clinton Jr.; Gary Shider	Knucklehead	3:08
10.	"Would You Know?"	Alsina; Jeanty; McMillion; Brandon Hodge	B.A.M.	5:35
11.	"Song Cry"	Alsina; Jeanty; Hodge	B.A.M.	4:29
12.	"Other Side"	Alsina; McMillion; Jeanty; Hodge	B.A.M.	3:59
13.	"American Dream"	Alsina; McMillion; Jeanty; Irving III; Fitzgerald Scott; Keith Sweat	Knucklehead	3:28
14.	"Look At How Far I've Come"	Alsina; McMillion; Jeanty; Dominyque Allen	MelloTheProducer; The Exclusives	4:24
15.	"The Encore"	Alsina; McMillion; Jeanty; Harvey Averne; Jamal Jones; Ralfi Pagan	Polow da Don	3:46
Total length:				56:23

== Charts ==
=== Weekly charts ===
Chart (2016)	Peak position
US Billboard 200	14
US Top R&B/Hip-Hop Albums (Billboard)	2

=== Year-end charts ===
Chart (2016)	Position
US Top R&B/Hip-Hop Albums (Billboard)	40
