= Don't Be S.A.F.E. =

Mixtape by Trinidad James
- Released: September 18, 2012
- Recorded: 2012
- Genre: Hip hop
- Length: 29:28
- Label: Gold Gang; Def Jam
- Producer: Trinidad James (exec.); Devon Gallaspy; ForteBowie; Soufien3000

Singles from Don't Be S.A.F.E.
- 1. "All Gold Everything" Released: December 20, 2012; 2. "Females Welcomed" Released: April 19, 2013

Professional ratings
Review scores
Source	Rating
RapReviews	7/10

Don't Be S.A.F.E. (an acronym for Sensitive As Fuck Everyday) is the debut mixtape by American rapper Trinidad James. The mixtape was self-released on September 18, 2012, but was re-released exclusively to retailers on January 29, 2013 by Gold Gang Records and Def Jam Recordings. The mixtape features guest appearances by other indie artists including Reija Lee (of the electronic duo Kito & Reija Lee), ForteBowie, Currensy (credited as "Juke"), and others. The retail version features a remix to "All Gold Everything", featuring T.I., Young Jeezy and 2 Chainz.

== Track listing ==
No.	Title	Writer(s)	Producer(s)	Length
1.	"Tonk for the Money"	Nicholas Williams; Derek Tucker	Tucker	2:24
2.	"Females Welcomed" (featuring Reija Lee)	Williams; Reija Lee Thomas	Justin Padron; Shawn Hosea^{[a]}	3:12
3.	"Gold on My MacBook"	Williams; Terrell Gholston	T-Deezy	1:36
4.	"Team Vacation" (featuring Spook, Coop and Snake)	Williams; Anthony Williams	A. Williams	4:38
5.	"One More Molly"	Williams; Devon Gallaspy; Jeffrey Jaggers	Jaggers	3:53
6.	"All Gold Everything"	Williams; Gallaspy	Gallaspy	3:07
7.	"Sneaky vs. Selfish"	Williams; Gholston	T-Deezy	1:08
8.	"Madden on GameCube" (featuring Juke)	Williams; Shante Franklin	@TaylorTracks	2:18
9.	"Given No Fucks"	Williams; Gallaspy; Jason Won Chung	Gallaspy; Naid Noir^{[a]}	2:41
10.	"SouthSide"	Williams	ForteBowie	4:27
Total length:				29:28

Retail version bonus track
No.	Title	Writer(s)	Producer(s)	Length
11.	"All Gold Everything (Remix)" (featuring T.I., Young Jeezy and 2 Chainz)	Williams; Gallaspy; Clifford Harris, Jr.; Jay Jenkins; Tauheed Epps	Gallaspy	4:46
Total length:				33:59

Notes

- ^{^a} signifies a co-producer.
- Any track that has the letter "S" is replaced with the dollar sign ($).
- On the physical retail edition, "Females Welcomed" does not credit Reija Lee as the featured artist.
- "Team Vacation" is stylized as "#TeamVacation".
- "SouthSide" features additional vocals by ForteBowie.

== Personnel ==
Album credits were revealed on the physical retail version.

- Executive producer: Trinidad James
- Def Jam A&R: Karen Kwak
- A&R administration: Terese Joseph
- A&R coordination: Leesa D. Brunson
- Marketing: Christopher Atlas
- Mastering: Edgar Vargas
- Art producers: Tai Linzie
- Art direction and design: Tai Linzie
- Legal counsels for Def Jam: Damien Granderson and Colin Morrissey
- Management: Jordan Merz
- Package production: Carol Corless
- Vocal engineers: Jack "Suthernfolk" Brown and Tony Ray
- Mixing engineers: Justin Padron and Finis "KY" White
- Mastering assistant: Justin Padron
- Sample Clearance: Danny Zook & Corey "Siel" Lloyd

== Charts ==
Chart (2013)	Peak position
US Billboard 200	103
US Top R&B/Hip-Hop Albums (Billboard)	23
US Heatseekers Albums (Billboard)	1

== Release history ==
Region	Date	Format	Label
Worldwide	September 18, 2012	Digital download	—N/a
Worldwide	January 29, 2013	CD; LP; digital download	Gold Gang; Def Jam
