= Myself (August Alsina album) =

Studio album by August Alsina
- Released: March 10, 2023
- Recorded: 2022–23
- Genre: R&B
- Length: 26:34
- Label: Shake the World; Empire
- Producer: August Alsina; Ayo Bleu; B Whit Productions; Beezo; Brandon Chinyoka; CANDYCHYLD; CashGotHeat; Cesar; DJ Mango; G-Styles On The Track; Happie; Losaddos; Ocyrus Anthony Rastafari; Romano; Sean McMillion; The Exclusives; Tyler Javeon; VVS Melody

August Alsina chronology
The Product III: State of Emergency (2020)	Myself (2023)

Singles from Myself
- 1. "Lied To You" Released: December 16, 2022; 2. "Myself" Released: January 20, 2023

Myself is the fourth studio album by American singer and songwriter August Alsina. It was released on March 10, 2023, through his label Shake the World and Empire Distribution. It features guest appearances by 4ayem, Deeno., Layton Greene and Zu. Production was handled by several producers including long time collaborators The Exclusives.

== Background and release ==
On December 16, 2022, August Alsina released the debut single of the album titled "Lied To You". On January 5, 2023, he released a video for the single.

On January 20, 2023, he released the album titled track "Myself" as the second single, which was accompanied by a video.

On March 8, 2023, he announced via Instagram that the album would be released two days later.

== Track listing ==
Myself track listing
No.	Title	Writer(s)	Producer(s)	Length
1.	"Myself"	August Alsina; Sean McMillion; William Kelly Jr.	Tyler Javeon; Ayo Bleu; DJ Mango	2:06
2.	"Lied To You"	Alsina; McMillion; Terence Jamiel Williams	The Exclusives; Romano; Cesar	3:00
3.	"Weekdays" (featuring Deeno. and Zu)	Alsina	Sean McMillion; Ocyrus Anthony Rastafari	3:27
4.	"Never Fold"	Alsina; McMillion	The Exclusives; Tyler Javeon; Ayo Bleu; DJ Mango	1:45
5.	"Same"	Alsina; McMillion	The Exclusives; Tyler Javeon; Ayo Bleu; DJ Mango	2:48
6.	"Party"	Alsina; McMillion	The Exclusives; Happie; Losaddos	2:32
7.	"August"	Alsina; McMillion	Beezo; The Exclusives; CashGotHeat; CANDYCHYLD	2:11
8.	"Rules"	Alsina; McMillion	August Alsina; The Exclusives	2:50
9.	"Friends" (with 4ayem)	Alsina; McMillion	The Exclusives; Romano; VVS Melody; Brandon Chinyoka	2:38
10.	"On Me" (with Layton Greene)	Alsina; McMillion; Layton Greene	The Exclusives; G-Styles On The Track; B Whit Productions	3:17
Total length:				26:34
