= Downtown: Life Under the Gun =

EP by August Alsina
- Released: August 20, 2013
- Recorded: 2012–2013
- Genres: R&B; hip hop
- Length: 32:24
- Labels: Radio Killa; Def Jam
- Producers: Andrew "Hit Drew" Clifton; Carlos Cahee; Cassius Jay; Eric Hudson; The Exclusives; Knucklehead

August Alsina chronology
Downtown: Life Under the Gun (2013)	Testimony (2014)

Singles from Downtown: Life Under the Gun
- 1. "I Luv This Shit" Released: February 19, 2013; 2. "Ghetto" Released: December 9, 2013

Downtown: Life Under the Gun is the debut extended play (EP) by American singer August Alsina. The album was released on August 20, 2013, by Radio Killa Records and Def Jam Recordings. The album features guest appearances from Kidd Kidd, Trinidad James, Currensy and Rich Homie Quan. The album was supported by two official singles; "I Luv This Shit" and "Ghetto" featuring Rich Homie Quan.

== Singles ==
On February 14, 2013, the music video was released for "I Luv This Shit" featuring Trinidad James. Five days later, "I Luv This Shit" was released for digital download. The song peaked at number 48 on the Billboard Hot 100 and number 13 on the Billboard Hot R&B/Hip-Hop Songs chart. On July 26, 2013, the music video was released for "Downtown" featuring Kidd Kidd. On August 13, 2013, the music video was released for "Let Me Hit That" featuring Currensy. On September 16, 2013, the music video was released for "Hell On Earth". On October 17, 2013, the music video was released for "Ghetto" featuring Rich Homie Quan. On December 9, 2013, the second single from the album, "Ghetto" featuring Rich Homie Quan was serviced to urban contemporary radio in the United States. It was later released for digital download on February 11, 2014. On December 31, 2013, the music video was released for "Don't Forget About Me".

== Critical response ==
Professional ratings
Review scores
Source	Rating
AllMusic	3.5/5 stars

Andy Kellman of AllMusic said, "Although he now has as much arrogance as anyone else on contemporary R&B radio, his lingering pain remains, punctuated by a handful of between-song monologues that are all the more chilling for being expressed in a matter-of-fact tone. The gritty realism in ballads like "Hell on Earth" and "Nobody Knows" hints at future greatness. He's singing about his life, not romanticizing it."

== Track listing ==
No.	Title	Producer(s)	Length
1.	"Hell On Earth"	D. Clax	2:28
2.	"Downtown" (featuring Kidd Kidd)	Knucklehead; Carlos Cahee	4:42
3.	"Survival of the Fittest"		3:38
4.	"I Luv This Shit" (featuring Trinidad James)	Knucklehead	4:27
5.	"Let Me Hit That" (featuring Currensy)	Cassius Jay	3:48
6.	"Ghetto" (featuring Rich Homie Quan)	Knucklehead	5:13
7.	"Don't Forget About Me"	Eric Hudson; Andrew "Hit Drew" Clifton	3:56
8.	"Nobody Knows"	Cassius Jay; The Exclusives	4:11

== Charts ==
=== Weekly charts ===
Chart (2013)	Peak position
US Billboard 200	68
US Top R&B/Hip-Hop Albums (Billboard)	14

=== Year-end charts ===
Chart (2014)	Position
US Top R&B/Hip-Hop Albums (Billboard)	87
