= Sole Collector =

American media brand and publication

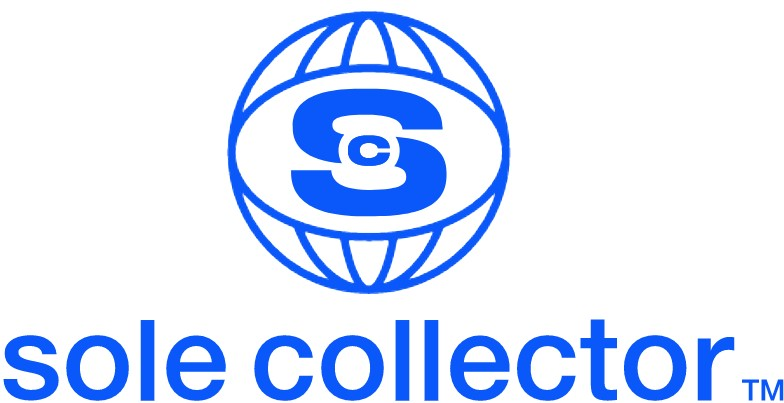
- Editor: Brendan Dunne
- Categories: Cultural Online Publication
- Founder: Coach; Steve Mulholland; Alex Wang; Nicole Fesette
- Founded: 2003; 23 years ago
- Company: Complex Networks
- Country: United States
- Based in: New York City
- Language: English
- Website: www.solecollector.com

Sole Collector is an American media brand and publication founded in Portland, Oregon which focuses on sneaker news and sneaker culture. The company is based in New York and owned by Complex Networks.

== History ==
Sole Collector was founded in 2003 by Steve Mulholland, Alex Wang, and Nicole Fesette as a print magazine aimed at providing young males a report of the latest in sneaker culture. Its origins reach back to 1999 when Mulholland created Instyleshoes.com which was both a forum and web store. Instyleshoes (The Forum) was later re-branded Sole Collector (the brand) along with a quarterly print magazine and blog. After Sole Collector began to take off, Instyleshoes.com (The web store) was sold in 2010 and is now run by parent company Ivehademall.

In 2013, Sole Collector was purchased by Complex Media (now Complex Networks), adding the magazine and website to its roster of "owned and operated" brands.

In June 2023, the Sole Collector website was redirected to Complex.com.

== Covers ==
In 2010, Sole Collector released issue 34 dubbed ‘The Ultimate Issue' which was the first issue released in hard cover format. The magazine released its first iPad all digital magazine issue in 2012 with an exclusive interview with Tinker Hatfield and Tiffany Beers, shot at a secret location on Nike campus.

== Collaborations ==
Sole Collector has worked with many sneaker companies including Nike, Jordan Brand, Reebok and Under Armour to create unique sneakers for the brand.

== Sole Collector App ==
In November 2019, Complex Networks told sources they were developing a marketplace and content distribution app under the Sole Collector name. In May 2020, Complex launched the Sole Collector app, which allows users to shop for sneakers, compare prices, create and share sneaker lists, and access Sole Collector’s media content, including the web series Full Size Run.

== Full Size Run Show ==
In 2017, Sole Collector began producing a web series and podcast titled Full Size Run, initially hosted by Brendan Dunne and Rich “Maze” Lopez. The show features celebrity guests and discussions about sneaker news and culture. Previous guests have included Jim Jones, Rich the Kid, and E-40. The show's current hosts are Brendan Dunne, Matt Welty, and Trinidad James.
