= I Luv This Shit =

Single by August Alsina featuring Trinidad James

from the album Downtown: Life Under the Gun and Testimony
- Released: February 19, 2013
- Studio: Goldie's Playhouse and Zac Recording, Atlanta, Georgia
- Genre: R&B
- Length: 4:27
- Label: Def Jam
- Songwriters: August Alsina; Sean McMillion; Ralph Jeanty; Samuel Irving III; Christine Massa; Nicholas Williams
- Producer: Knucklehead

August Alsina singles chronology
"I Luv This Shit" (2013)	"Numb" (2013)

Trinidad James singles chronology
"All Gold Everything" (2012)	"I Luv This Shit" (2013)	"Females Welcomed" (2013)

Audio sample
- file; help

"I Luv This Shit" (clean version titled "I Luv This" or "I Luv This Sh*t") is the debut single by American singer August Alsina, released by Def Jam Recordings on February 19, 2013 as the lead single from both his debut EP Downtown: Life Under the Gun (2013) and debut studio album, Testimony (2014). It features a guest appearance from Def Jam labelmate, American rapper Trinidad James. "I Luv This Shit" is an R&B song about partying with alcohol and drugs. Two remixes—one featuring Birdman, and another featuring Trey Songz and Chris Brown—were released.

The song was well received by music critics, and peaked at number 48 on the US Billboard Hot 100 and number 13 on the Hot R&B/Hip-Hop Songs chart. It was promoted by a Motion Family-directed music video and performances on The Wendy Williams Show, 106 & Park and The Arsenio Hall Show.

== Background and composition ==
"I Luv This Shit" was written by August Alsina, The Exclusives (Sean McMillion and Ralph Jeanty), Samuel Irving III, Christine Massa, and Trinidad James and was produced by Knucklehead. It was recorded by McMillion and Cody Sciara at Goldie's Playhouse and Zac Recording Studios in Atlanta, Georgia, and mixed by Jaycen Joshua with assistance from Trehy Harris at Larrabee Sound Studios, North Hollywood. Vocals were produced by The Exclusives. Knucklehead told Vibe in 2014 that he created the song's beat and knew it would be successful, stating: "I just knew what [Alsina's] voice was gonna do over my beat. And that beat didn't sound like [any]thing else at the time that was out ... When I made the beat, I called him immediately after I finished it." After playing the beat to Alsina and The Exclusives, they recorded the song in one hour. It is an R&B song instrumented by guitar, synthesizer, synth-horns and a heavy bassline. The production was compared by Spin's Brandon Soderberg to the work of Alsina's mentor, The-Dream. It revolves around about partying with alcohol and drugs with the central hook "I love this shit", and references the vodka Ciroc, yet there is an element of sorrow to Alsina's vocals. James' verse contemplates human nature, according to Gregory Adams of Exclaim!. "I Luv This Shit" was originally recorded for Alsina's mixtape The Product 2 (2013), and was included on his debut EP Downtown: Life Under the Gun (2013). It was also a bonus track on his first studio album, Testimony (2014).

== Release ==
"I Luv This Shit" was released as a digital download by Def Jam Recordings on February 19, 2013 in Canada and the United States. A remix of the song, titled "I Luv This Shit (G-Mix)", was made available for streaming in May 2013 and features Birdman. The single impacted rhythmic contemporary radio in the United States on September 3, 2013. Trey Songz and Chris Brown appeared on another remix of "I Luv This Shit"; it was released for digital download by Def Jam on October 4, 2013 in the US. Songz and Brown wrote their verses of the remix. Alsina's vocals for the remix were recorded by Macmillion at Upper Class Studios, Atlanta. Songz' vocals were recorded by Anthony Daniels at Premier Studios in New York City and Brown's were recorded by Brian Springer at Glenwood Studios in Burbank, California.

== Reception ==
AllMusic's Andy Kellman picked "I Luv This Shit" as one of the best tracks from both Downtown and Testimony. Gregory Adams of Exclaim! praised Alsina's "velvety" vocal delivery on the song. Brandon Soderberg from Spin called it "one of the more mazy and rewarding radio R&B songs in quite some time", but was unimpressed with the Songz and Brown remix's shift from partying to sexual intercourse, particularly the rewriting of the hook as "She loves this shit" or "You love this shit". A panel of writers for Complex placed "I Luv This Shit" at number thirty-three on its list of the 50 Best Songs of 2013; Claire Lobenfeld disapproved of James' verse but lauded the "quivering beauty" of Alsina's voice. At the 2014 BET Awards, "I Luv This Shit" won the award for Viewer's Choice and was nominated for the award of Best Collaboration, losing to "Drunk in Love" by Beyoncé and Jay-Z.

"I Luv This Shit" topped the Mainstream R&B/Hip-Hop chart for two weeks in October 2013, becoming the first R&B artist to reach number one with a debut single since Jeremih with "Birthday Sex" in 2009. On the main Hot R&B/Hip-Hop Songs, it reached number thirteen, and peaked at number eighteen on the Rhythmic chart. It spent three weeks atop the US Heatseekers Songs in October and November 2013, then peaked at number forty-eight on the Billboard Hot 100. On March 6, 2014 the Recording Industry Association of America (RIAA) certified "I Luv This Shit" gold for shipping 500,000 copies. The certification was updated to platinum (1,000,000) on October 2, 2014.

== Music video and live performances ==
The music video for "I Luv This Shit" was filmed in Atlanta in January 2013 and directed by Motion Family. Alsina sleeps with two women, then James delivers his verse while a woman dances next to him. At the end of the song Alsina and James go to a strip club, where the two women see each other and engage in an argument while Alsina laughs. Alsina performed "I Luv This Shit" on The Wendy Williams Show on October 28, 2013. For the New Year's Eve 2013 special of 106 & Park, titled 106 & Party, he performed the remix of the song with Songz and the remix of "Numb". On April 1, 2014 Alsina was interviewed and performed a medley of "Make It Home" and "I Luv This Shit" on late-night talk show The Arsenio Hall Show. At the 2014 BET Awards, Alsina performed "Kissin' on My Tattoos" before transitioning into "I Luv This Shit". Songz and Brown joined him and sang their verses of the remix. Songz finished the performance with "Na Na".

== Charts ==
=== Weekly charts ===
Chart (2014)	Peak position
US Billboard Hot 100	48
US Hot R&B/Hip-Hop Songs (Billboard)	15
US Rhythmic Airplay (Billboard)	19

=== Year-end charts ===
Chart (2014)	Position
US Hot R&B/Hip-Hop Songs (Billboard)	79

== Certifications ==
Region	Certification	Certified units/sales
New Zealand (RMNZ)	Platinum	30,000^{‡}
United States (RIAA)	2× Platinum	2,000,000^{‡}
^{‡} Sales+streaming figures based on certification alone.
