= Numb (August Alsina song) =

Single by August Alsina featuring B.o.B and Yo Gotti

from the album Testimony
- Released: December 10, 2013
- Recorded: 2013
- Genre: Hip hop; R&B
- Length: 4:14
- Label: Def Jam
- Songwriters: August Alsina; Bobby Simmons; Mario Mims; Dijon McFarlane
- Producer: DJ Mustard

August Alsina singles chronology
"I Luv This Shit" (2013)	"Numb" (2013)	"Make It Home" (2014)

B.o.B singles chronology
"John Doe" (2013)	"Numb" (2013)	"Not for Long" (2014)

Yo Gotti singles chronology
"I Know" (2013)	"Numb" (2013)	"Yayo" (2014)

Music video
- "Numb" on YouTube

"Numb" is a song by American singer August Alsina, released on December 10, 2013, as the third single from his debut studio album Testimony (2014). The song was produced by DJ Mustard and features guest appearances from American rappers B.o.B and Yo Gotti. When it was originally released in October 2013 it featured West Coast rappers Iamsu! and Problem. The song has since peaked at number 39 on the US Billboard Hot R&B/Hip-Hop Songs.

== Commercial performance ==
Following the BET Awards 2014, August Alsina experienced a surge in digital single sales resulting in "Numb" reaching a new peak of 41 on the Billboard Hot R&B/Hip-Hop Songs chart. On the week ending June 29, 2014, the song sold 8,757 copies, up from 3,920 copies the previous week.

== Music video ==
The music video for "Numb" was released on December 2, 2013.

== Chart performance ==
Chart (2014)	Peak position
US Bubbling Under Hot 100 (Billboard)	22
US Hot R&B/Hip-Hop Songs (Billboard)	38
US Rhythmic Airplay (Billboard)	13
