= August Alsina =

American singer (born 1992)

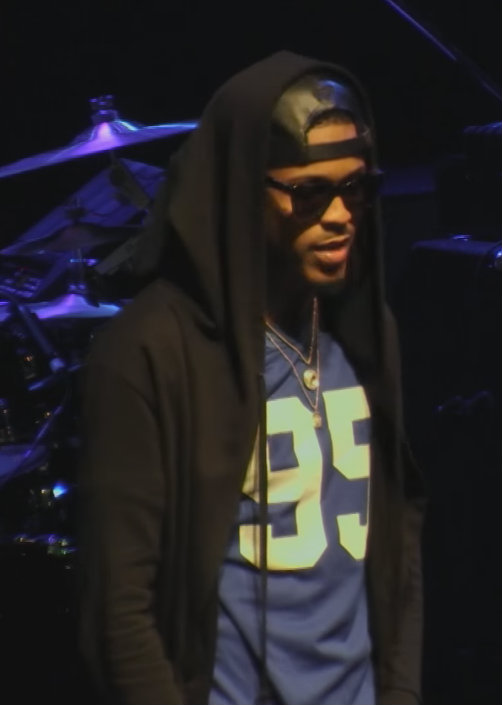
- Alsina performing in 2014

Background information
- Born: August Anthony Alsina Jr. September 3, 1992 (age 34); New Orleans, Louisiana, U.S.
- Origin: Houston, Texas, U.S.
- Genres: R&B; hip-hop soul; pop
- Occupations: Singer
- Works: August Alsina discography
- Years active: 2011–present
- Labels: Shake the World; EMPIRE; Def Jam; Radio Killa
- Producer(s): The Exclusives

August Anthony Alsina Jr. (born September 3, 1992) is an American R&B singer. He self-released his debut mixtape The Product in 2012, which was followed by The Product 2 the following year; he signed with The-Dream's Radio Killa Records, an imprint of Def Jam Recordings to release his debut commercial extended play (EP), Downtown: Life Under the Gun (2013). The EP marked his first entry on the Billboard 200 and was preceded by his debut single, "I Luv This Shit" (featuring Trinidad James), which peaked within the top 50 of the Billboard Hot 100 and received double platinum certification by the Recording Industry Association of America (RIAA). His 2014 follow-up single, "No Love (Remix)" (featuring Nicki Minaj), was met with similar commercial success, also receiving double platinum certification.

Both songs were issued as lead singles for Alsina's debut studio album Testimony (2014), which peaked at number two on the Billboard 200 and saw critical praise. His second album, This Thing Called Life (2015), was less commercially-oriented, but received continued critical praise. During this time, Alsina notably guest performed on DJ Khaled's hit singles "Hold You Down" in 2014 and "Do You Mind" in 2016. After a long-tenured hiatus and departure from Def Jam, he self-released his third and fourth albums, The Product III: State of Emergency (2020) and Myself (2022).

== Early life ==
Alsina was born on September 3, 1992 in New Orleans, Louisiana. He attended middle school in New Orleans. Although no one in his family was musically inclined, he was inspired to sing by Lauryn Hill in Sister Act 2. Alsina first uploaded videos to YouTube in 2007 at age 14, starting with a cover of "Hypothetically" by Lyfe Jennings.

With both his father and stepfather battling crack cocaine addiction, Alsina's mother moved him to Houston, Texas, in search of a fresh start after Hurricane Katrina in 2005. Then, Alsina's father died. Alsina had disagreements with his mother at some point and was "kicked out." After his older brother, Melvin La'Branch III, was shot and killed on August 31, 2010, he became more committed to his music, and relocated to Atlanta in 2011.

== Career ==
=== 2012–2014: Downtown: Life Under The Gun and Testimony ===
His first mixtape The Product was released in April 2012, though an "Untitled" mixtape with six acoustic covers premiered in October 2011. His single "I Luv This Shit" featuring Trinidad James was released in January 2013, and his mixtape The Product 2 followed in May 2013.

The EP Downtown: Life Under the Gun was released on August 20, 2013, with a video for "Hell on Earth" released the following month. On December 9, 2013, the third single from his EP Downtown: Life Under the Gun, "Ghetto" featuring Rich Homie Quan, was serviced to urban contemporary radio and it was the most added song on urban radio the week ending December 12, 2013. On January 14, 2014, Alsina released "Make It Home" featuring Jeezy, as the lead single from his debut studio album. Along with the release, it was revealed that the album would be titled Testimony, which was released on April 15, 2014. He was named part of the 2014 XXL freshmen class.

=== 2015–2016: This Thing Called Life ===
On December 11, 2015, Alsina released his second studio album, This Thing Called Life. It debuted at number 14 on the Billboard 200, with first-week sales of 41,000 copies in the United States. The album was supported by five singles; "Hip Hop", "Why I Do It" (featuring Lil Wayne), "Song Cry", "Been Around the World" (featuring Chris Brown) and "Dreamer".

=== 2017–present: The Product III: stateofEMERGEncy ===
Alsina had been working on his third studio album since 2017. On January 6, 2017, Alsina released the singles "Drugs". Then on June 1, 2017, "Lonely", and on June 6, 2017, "Don't Matter" was released for the album. The album, The Product III: State of Emergency was eventually released on June 26, 2020. The singer announced that the album highlights "the struggle in my life, my upbringing as a crack baby, losing my father and sister, and becoming the guardian for my three nieces", as well as his battle with the auto-immune disease that affected him.

On September 21, 2021, he announced that he was “likely” retiring from music. However in March 2023 he released a new album titled "MySelf".

== Artistry ==
Alsina's music generally falls into the R&B category, often fusing it with hip-hop. His musical influences are Chris Brown, Usher and Lyfe Jennings.

== Personal life ==
=== Health condition ===
In 2015, the singer revealed that he was going blind due to a degenerative eye disease. In 2017, the singer revealed that he suffers from a severe autoimmune disease that attacks his liver. This illness has led to multiple incidents including a collapse on stage in 2014 which he ended up in a three-day coma.

On July 8, 2019, Alsina updated his health scare. In a video he posted to Instagram, the singer explained that he was hospitalized after suffering a loss of mobility. "We're doing a bunch of tests and they're saying I have some nerve damage going on throughout my body".

=== Jada Pinkett Smith relationship ===
In June 2020, Alsina, a friend of Jada Pinkett Smith's son Jaden, said that he and Pinkett Smith had been involved in an adulterous affair in 2016, when he was 23 years old and she was 44. He also claimed that the affair happened with Jada's husband Will Smith's permission. A spokesman for Pinkett Smith denied the claims, saying they were "absolutely not true". However, on July 10, 2020, in an episode of her talk show Red Table Talk alongside her husband, Pinkett Smith revealed that she did have a romantic relationship with Alsina four and a half years prior, when she and Will were separated. She stated she "got into a different kind of entanglement with August." Jada and Will denied that Will gave Alsina permission for the relationship, with Jada saying Alsina "would perceive it as permission because we [she and Will] were separated amicably". Pinkett Smith further claimed she wanted to "heal" Alsina, but needed to find healing for herself first. She and Will eventually reconciled after she broke things off with Alsina; she says she has not spoken with Alsina since.

After Jada's use of the word "entanglement" went viral on the Internet, Alsina released a collaboration titled "Entanglements" with rapper Rick Ross on July 19, 2020, in which Alsina sings "You left your man just to fuck with me and break his heart".

=== August Alsina’s Relationship with Zu ===
Alsina first publicly introduced Zu, a male R&B singer, during an episode of the reality TV series The Surreal Life in 2022, where he stated that he wanted to honour Zu for the love they share. This declaration prompted widespread speculation, as fans interpreted it as Alsina coming out publicly.

Online speculation intensified following their appearance at Atlanta Pride Weekend in 2025. In response, Zu took to Instagram and addressed rumors—particularly about their age difference—clarifying that he met Alsina when he was already an adult. In the same statement, he also went on to state that “August is my boyfriend, and we’re happy with each other, simple...”

== Discography ==
- Testimony (2014)
- This Thing Called Life (2015)
- The Product III: State of Emergency (2020)
- Myself (2023)

== Awards and nominations ==
=== BET Awards ===
Year	Nominee / work	Award	Result
2014	August Alsina	Best Male R&B/Pop Artist	Nominated
2014	August Alsina	Best New Artist	Won
2014	"I Luv This Shit"	Best Collaboration	Nominated
2014	"I Luv This Shit"	Coca-Cola Viewers' Choice Award	Won
2015	August Alsina	Best Male R&B/Pop Artist	Nominated
2015	"No Love" (Remix)	Best Collaboration	Nominated

== Tours ==
Headlining

- Testimony Live (2014)

Supporting

- The UR Experience Tour (with Usher) (2014)
- One Hell of a Nite Tour (with Chris Brown) (2015)
