= The Exclusives =

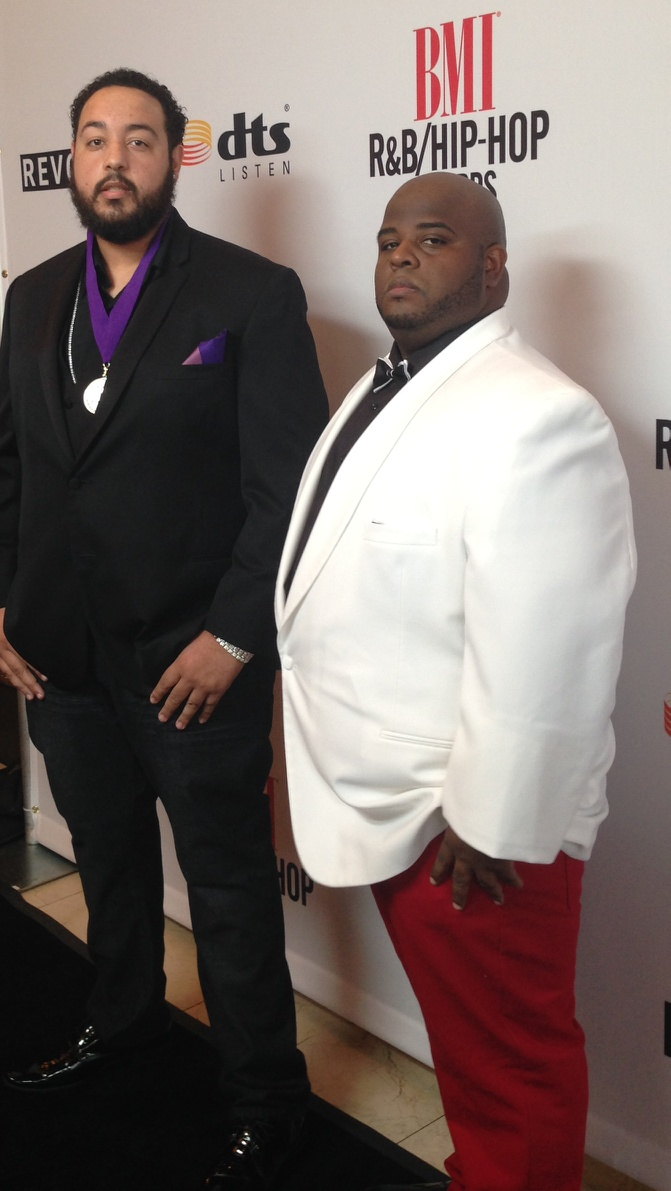
- Ralph Jeanty and Sean McMillion at the BMI R&B HipHop Awards Red Carpet

Background information
- Also known as: Move Sumthin' Productions
- Origin: Miami, Florida, United States
- Genres: Hip hop, R&B
- Occupations: Producers, Songwriters Vocal Producers, Mix Engineers
- Years active: 2004–present
- Members: Sean "Pen" McMillion; Ralph "Vintage" Jeanty

The Exclusives (formerly Move Sumthin Productions) are an American/Canadian R&B/pop/hip hop songwriting and production team from Miami, Florida, consisting of Sean "Pen" McMillion and Ralph "Vintage" Jeanty. The now Atlanta-based team's first notable success came from co-writing the platinum-selling single "I Luv This Shit" by August Alsina.

== Music career ==
The Exclusives began as songwriters and producers, co-writing the song "Never Window Shopping" for Lloyd on his Zone 4/Interscope release King of Hearts.

Under the mentorship of R&B legend Betty Wright, the duo collaborated with Wright and The Roots, co-writing two songs on their album Betty Wright: The Movie, released on November 15, 2011. The album received mostly positive reviews; Metascore gave it a 73 out of 100. Pen and Vintage co-wrote the songs "Real Woman", featuring Snoop Dogg, and "Baby Come Back", featuring Lenny Williams.

Work on the Betty Wright album afforded them the opportunity to work with The Roots on their first concept album, entitled Undun, which was released on December 2, 2011. The album debuted at No. 17 on Billboard Hot 200; The Exclusives co-wrote the song "The Other Side", featuring Greg Porn and Bilal.

The duo met a young August Alsina in 2011 and recorded "I Luv This Shit" in 2012. It topped the Mainstream R&B/Hip-Hop chart for two weeks in November 2013, August Alsina became the first R&B artist to reach number one with a debut single since Jeremih with "Birthday Sex" in 2009. On the main Hot R&B/Hip-Hop Songs, it reached number 15, and peaked at number 19 on the Rhythmic chart. It peaked at number 48 on the Billboard Hot 100. On March 6, 2014, the Recording Industry Association of America (RIAA) certified "I Luv This Shit" gold for shipping 500,000 copies. The certification was updated to platinum on October 2, 2014.

In August 2014, The Exclusives inked a publishing deal with Warner Chappell Music.

== Notable charted songs ==
List of singles, with selected chart positions and certifications, showing year released and album name
Title	Year	Peak chart positions			Certifications	Album
Title	Year	US	US R&B/HH	US R&B	Certifications	Album
"I Luv This Shit" (August Alsina featuring Trinidad James)	2013	48	13	4	RIAA: Platinum	Downtown: Life Under the Gun and Testimony
"Ghetto" ( August Alsina featuring Rich Homie Quan or Yo Gotti)	2013	115	37	19	RIAA: Gold	Testimony
"Numb" ( August Alsina featuring B.o.B and Yo Gotti)	2013	122	38	16	RIAA: Gold	Testimony
"Make It Home" ( August Alsina featuring Jeezy)	2014	—	51	22		Testimony
"No Love" ( August Alsina featuring Nicki Minaj (credited as Vocal Producers)	2014	69	17	6	RIAA: Platinum	Testimony
"—" denotes a recording that did not chart or was not released in that territory.

== Executive production credits ==
- August Alsina – This Thing Called Life

Chart (2015)	Peak position
US Billboard 200	14
US Top R&B/Hip-Hop Albums (Billboard)	2

== Discography ==
=== Writing/production credits for The Exclusives on notable works ===
- 2013: "I Luv This Shit" – August Alsina ft. Trinidad James
- 2013: "I Luv This Shit" Remix – August Alsina ft. Trey Songz and Chris Brown
- 2015: "Gold Slugs" – DJ Khaled featuring Chris Brown, August Alsina and Fetty Wap
- 2016: "Do You Mind" – DJ Khaled featuring Nicki Minaj, Chris Brown, August Alsina, Jeremih, Future and Rick Ross
