= Complex Networks =

American media and entertainment company

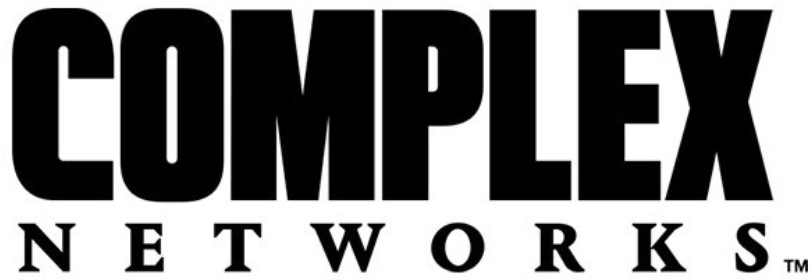
- Formerly: Complex
- Type: Subsidiary
- Industry: Media; Entertainment
- Predecessor: Complex (magazine) (last issue: December 2016/January 2017)
- Founded: 2002; 24 years ago
- Founders: Marc Eckō
- Headquarters: New York City, U.S.
- Area served: Worldwide
- Key people: Aaron Levant (CEO); Noah Callahan-Bever (Chief Content Officer); Aria Hughes (Editor-in-Chief); Donnie Kwak (GM); Joe LaPuma (SVP content strategy) Aleksey Baksheyev (CTO, Head of Product)
- Parent: NTWRK
- Website: complexnetworks.com (archived August 18, 2025)

Complex Networks is an American media and entertainment company for youth culture, based in New York City. It was founded as a bi-monthly magazine, Complex, by fashion designer Marc Eckō. Complex Networks reports on popular and emerging trends in style, sneakers, food, music, sports and pop culture. Complex Networks reached over 90 million unique users per month in 2013 across its owned and operated and partner sites, socials and YouTube channels. The print magazine ceased publication with the December 2016/January 2017 issue. Complex currently has 6.02 million subscribers and 1.8 billion total views on YouTube. As of 2019, the company's yearly revenue was estimated to be US$200 million, 15% of which came from commerce.

Complex Networks has been named by Business Insider as one of the Most Valuable Startups in New York, and Most Valuable Private Companies in the World. In 2012, the company launched Complex TV, an online broadcasting platform.

In 2016, it became a joint-venture of Verizon and Hearst. Subsequently in 2021, BuzzFeed, Inc. announced the acquisition of the company. In 2024, NTWRK acquired Complex Networks from BuzzFeed for $108 million.

== History ==
Complex was established in 2002 by the founder of the Ecko Unltd. brand, Marc Eckō, as a print magazine aimed at providing young men a report of the latest in hip hop, fashion and pop culture without regard to race. The name Complex evolved from a slogan developed to promote the Eckō Unltd. website: "Ecko.complex". The idea was to create a men's magazine that combined Eckō's streetwear and hip hop attitude along with the style of Japanese men's magazines by providing consumer guides. This was achieved by creating a magazine in two sections: one traditional magazine, and the other a shopping guide.

In 2005, Complex was joined by senior publishing executive turned future CEO, Rich Antoniello and the former senior editor of Vibe magazine, Noah Callahan-Bever, who became editor-in-chief and chief content officer a year later. By 2006, Complex had begun to turn a profit which allowed the magazine to consider an expansion of their online presence. In April 2007, Complex soft-launched a media network with four websites: NahRight, Nice Kicks, SlamxHype and MoeJackson.

=== Complex ===
COMPLEX
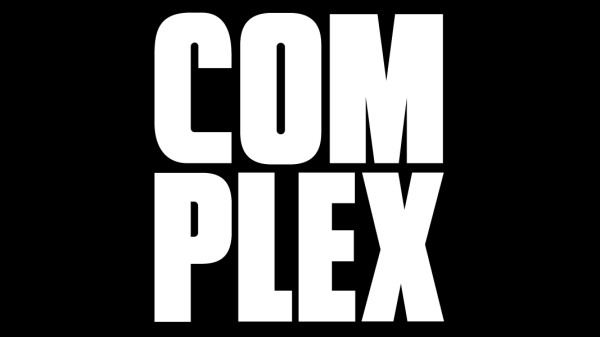

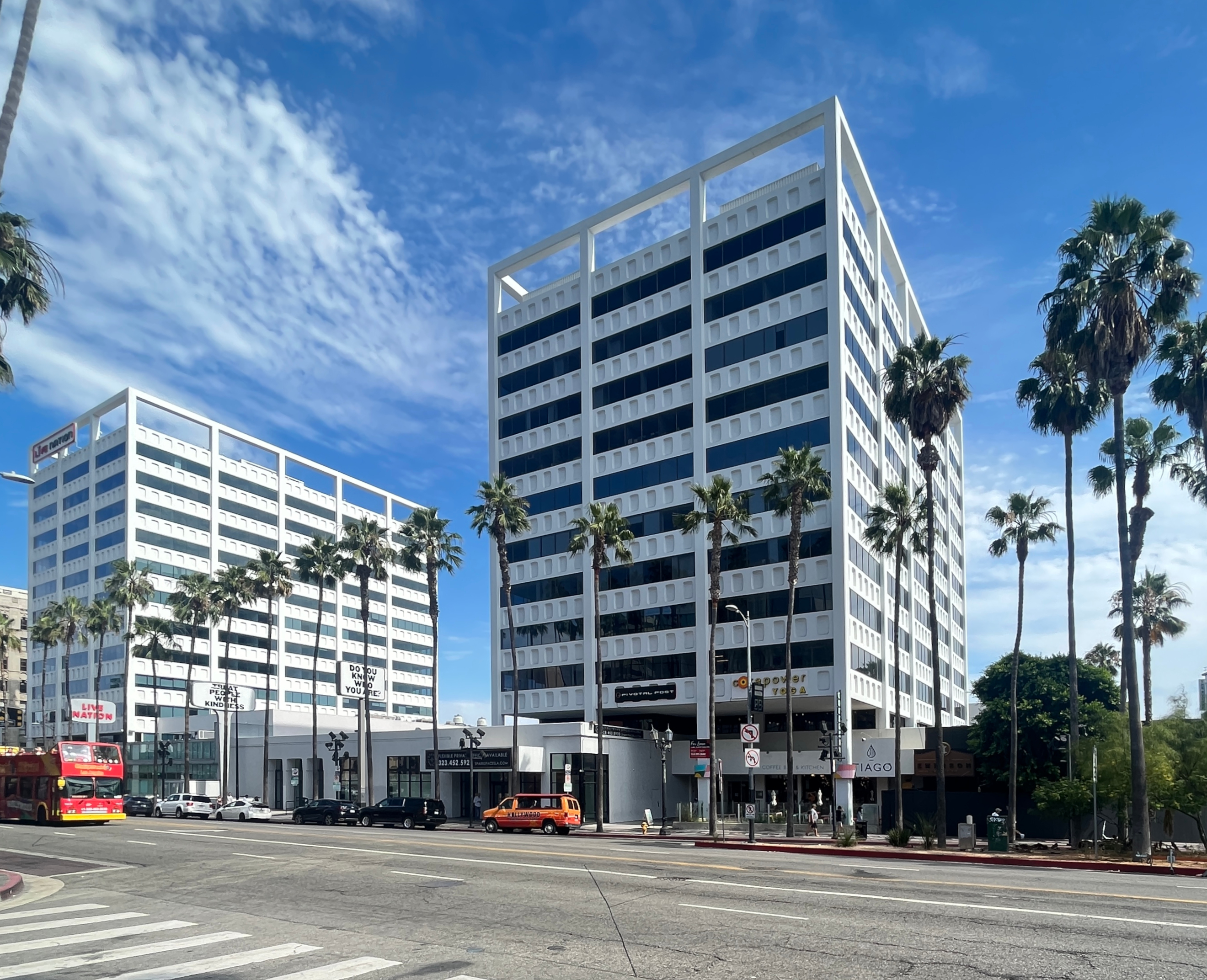
- Company headquarters
- Website type: Digital mass media
- Available in: English
- Headquarters: 7060 Hollywood Boulevard, Floor 2, Los Angeles
- Owners: Commerce Media Holdings, LLC (d.b.a. NTWRK)
- Website: complex.com
- Commercial: Yes
- Current status: Active

In September 2007, Complex launched Complex Media in order to fully capitalize on the trend toward digital content. In 2010, ad sales grew 154%. According to comScore, Complex got 12 million unique hits in March 2012. This encouraged large brands such as Coors, AT&T, Ford, McDonald's, Nike, Adidas and Apple to advertise within the collective. Complex now includes over 100 sites.

In 2011, Complex acquired Pigeons & Planes, an indie music and rap blog, and brought their total sites to 51 with monthly traffic of 25 million uniques. In 2012, Complex launched Four Pins, a humorous menswear site, edited by Fuck Yeah Menswear author Lawrence Schlossman; Sneaker Report, a performance footwear site; and First We Feast, a food culture site edited by former Time Out New York food editor Chris Schonberger. In 2013, Complex launched the dance music site Do Androids Dance and Green Label, a branded content site presented by Mountain Dew. That year, Complex also acquired the sneakerhead culture magazine and website Sole Collector.

On November 4, 2013, Complex premiered a new logo and cover design on Instagram that would appear online, as well as on the December 2013 Eminem cover issue.

In 2013, Complex partnered with Mountain Dew to launch "Green Label" an entertainment and culture website. In 2014, Complex launched an NBA-themed website called "Triangle Offense" in a partnership with Bacardi rum.

In August 2014, Complex ranked #3 in the United States in a ComScore survey of unique visitors between the ages of 18 and 34 with 20.3 million in that demographic per month. In January 2015, it announced its acquisition of Collider, the online source for movies, television, breaking news, incisive content, and imminent trends. Collider.com reaches over 3 million monthly unique readers (comScore, December 2014) powered by a team of ten writers, including founder and Editor in Chief Steve Weintraub. In February 2018, Complex sold Collider.com to former head-of-video Marc Fernandez.

In 2015, Do Androids Dance was merged into Complex. In 2016, Four Pins was closed.

=== Funding ===
In 2009, Complex raised $12.8 million from Accel Partners and Austin Ventures. In September 2013, it secured $25 million in a second round of funding from Iconix Brand Group, who own Rocawear, Starter, Eckō Unltd. and Umbro, among others.

=== Verizon Hearst Media Partners subsidiary ===
On April 18, 2016, Complex was acquired by a joint venture of Hearst Communications and Verizon Communications, Verizon Hearst Media Partners. The venture emphasized a goal of building "a portfolio of the emerging digital brands of the future for the millennial and Gen-Z audience", and proposed that Complex would develop content for Verizon-owned AOL and go90.

After a failure to reach expectations, on June 29, 2018, Verizon announced that go90 would shut down.

== Covers ==
Complex became known early on for its double-sided covers and split format. Complex covers often combined celebrities from across music, film and sports. Some of Complex's early covers included Nas (May 2002), Tony Hawk and Xzibit (June/July 2002), Ludacris and Dale Earnhardt Jr. (April/May 2003), and Mos Def and David Bowie (August/September 2003). In 2007, Complex gave Kim Kardashian her first-ever magazine shoot and cover.

Complex has since expanded to interactive digital covers. In September 2019, the American rapper Kid Cudi and the Japanese designer Nigo were interviewed by Complex and also appeared jointly on a digital cover and told the stories of their careers and rise in the entertainment and streetwear industries.

In 2024, Complex paired Eminem with his alter-ego Slim Shady on its cover. As part of the cover rollout Complex published a digital short, The Face-Off, which utilized artificial intelligence to feature a conversation between Eminem and Slim Shady. The short was written by Complex CCO Callahan-Bever and Marshall Mathers, and won two Webby Awards.

== Complex shows ==
Complex TV launched in 2012 as an online broadcaster of original content. Nathan Brown, a long-time video development and production executive, serves as general manager of Complex TV and Video. In December 2013, a subsidiary of Complex TV, Complex News, was launched, focusing on day-to-day news. In 2014, Pluto.tv added Complex Media as a content partner. Complex Content Studio is supported by an 18-person editorial team. According to WNIP source, "by 2016, Complex Networks had shifted 80% of its content budget to video and was launching dozens of individual shows under Complex's YouTube channel and a number of spin-off properties". On November 10, 2017, a block of Complex TV series began airing on the U.S. cable network Fuse under the Complex x Fuse banner.

Complex Networks has produced more than two dozen original shows, which include Hot Ones and Desus vs. Mero.

== Podcasts ==
Complex Networks launched three original podcasts at the end of 2019 in collaboration with a Swedish podcast firm Acast. Watch Less, covering such topics as movies and pop culture, hosted by Khris 'Khal' Davenport and Frazier Tharpe. The Complex Sports Podcast (formerly Load Management), hosted by Zach 'Chopz' Frydenlund, Zion Olojede, and Adam Caparell discusses sports and sports culture. The Complex Sneakers Podcast covers the history and present day of sneaker culture and is hosted by Joe La Puma, Matthew Welty, and Brendan Dunne.

== ComplexCon ==
Launch and Development (2015–2016): ComplexCon, an annual cultural festival and exhibition, was launched in 2016 by Complex Networks in partnership with ReedPop. It was co-created by Marc Eckō and Aaron Levant, combining Complex's influence in youth culture with Reed Exhibitions' event expertise. Designed as a "cultural World's Fair", ComplexCon merges music, art, fashion, food, and technology into an interactive experience. Eckō provided creative direction and industry connections, while Levant focused on execution and logistics.

Inaugural Event (2016): The first ComplexCon took place on November 5–6, 2016, at the Long Beach Convention Center, attracting 35,000 attendees. Eckō recruited Takashi Murakami to design the event's visual identity and Pharrell Williams as Cultural Director. The event featured concerts, brand exhibitions, streetwear pop-ups, art installations, and panels, with Eckō moderating discussions and shaping content.

In Spring 2016, the first two-day event took place at the Long Beach Convention and Entertainment Center in Long Beach, CA in November 2016 and featured performances by Snoop Dogg, Skrillex, Kid Cudi, and more. In 2019 the festival was held twice. The first event took place at McCormick Place in Chicago, IL in collaboration with a focus on local artists, designers, and musicians. The second festival occurred in the traditional Long Beach, CA location and included appearances by Selena Gomez, LL Cool J, Lil Kim, Offset, Kid Cudi, Lil Yachty, Timothée Chalamet, Yara Shahidi and Tyga. These virtual and in-person events have drawn in large crowds of young adults who relate and connect with the growing streetwear and rising hip-hop artists.

In 2024, Complex Networks was acquired by NTWRK, led by Aaron Levant, with plans for continued experiential marketing initiatives. Levant reinstated Noah Callahan-Bever as Chief Content Officer and promoted Aria Hughes to Editor-In-Chief. That same year, ComplexCon launched its first international edition in Hong Kong, followed by an announced return in 2025.

ComplexCon remains a flagship event for Complex Networks, recognized for influencing global street culture through its blend of commerce, entertainment, and community engagement.

In late 2025, ComplexCon hosted the return of the renowned and celebrated music streaming series Verzuz in Las Vegas, featuring Cash Money Records vs No Limit Records.

In 2026, during ComplexCon, rapper Lucki was involved in an altercation with members of fellow rapper Playboi Carti's entourage; videos would subsequently surface of him with an apparent slash on his neck.

== ComplexLand ==
In lieu of ComplexCon during the COVID-19 pandemic, Complex Networks launched a five-day virtual festival named "ComplexLand" in December 2020. The game took place in a video game format where users could visit virtual shops and order products that would be shipped to them in real life. Players could also access video content such as panels and performances. The event included virtual appearances by T-Pain, Fat Joe, Lil Yachty, Jack Harlow, and Donatella Versace. The interactive experience was accessible through web browser and was developed by Jam3 in WebGl.

== The Complex Shop ==
In December 2019, Complex Networks launched an online store called the Complex Shop. At launch, the store included items from 70 different clothing brands, including some exclusive collaborations.

The store also carries merchandise from Complex's various brands and content.

The Complex Shop has partnered with the Google News Initiative to measure audience engagement and consumer behavior. They also partnered with Neighborhood Spot and UNION x Dodgers to sell branded products.

== Brand partnerships ==
In 2013, Digiday stated Complex was one of the publishers that "acts like an agency" based on their branded content and brand partnerships. In 2013 alone, Complex created an average of 47 pieces of content a month on behalf of major brands, including McDonald's, Gillette, Levi's, Toyota, Adidas and others. It also partnered with PepsiCo to launch GreenLabel.com, a Mountain Dew-branded lifestyle site that's staffed by Complex's editorial employees. Green Label currently attracts over twice as much traffic as MountainDew.com. Later in 2013, Complex worked with Dr. Pepper to a series of videos aimed at young males featuring producer/songwriter The-Dream.

== Awards ==
Year	From	Award	For
2011	Business Insider	The 30 Most Valuable Internet Startups In New York	
2014	Digiday Video Awards	Best Original Non-Scripted Video Series	"Magnum Opus"
2015	Digiday Video Awards	Best Video Destination – Entertainment for Complex TV	
2018	2018 Webby Awards	Best Web Personality/Host	Sean Evans – First We Feast's "Hot Ones"
2019	2019 Webby Awards	Video: Fashion & Beauty	"Sneaker Shopping"
2019	2019 Webby Awards	Video: Food & Drink	First We Feast's "Hot Ones"
2019	BET Hip Hop Awards	Best Hip-Hop Online Site/App (winner)	Complex
2019	James Beard Foundation Award	Online Video, on Location (winner)	First We Feast's "Food Skills: The Mozzarella Kings of New York"
2020	Ad Age	Best Streetwear Summit (winner)	Best Experiential
2020	Fast Company	Most Innovative Media Company (winner)	Most Innovative Companies
2021	32nd GLAAD Media Awards	Outstanding Online Journalism - Video or Multimedia	"Stop Killing Us: Black Transgender Women's Lived Experiences"

== Controversies ==
=== Kim Kardashian photo ===
In 2009, AnimalNewYork.com reported that Complex had posted a digitally unenhanced version of April/May issue cover star Kim Kardashian. Complex swapped the enhanced image on their site, but not before the unenhanced version had gone viral. Kardashian responded to the incident on her blog, saying: "So what: I have a little cellulite. What curvy girl doesn't!?" She went on to say that she was "proud" of her body, posting behind-the-scenes pictures of the shoot on her website. The incident was covered by a variety of online publications including Huffington Post, NY Daily News, Business Insider, Gawker and others.

=== Wale threatens Complex staff ===
On December 11, 2013, Complex writer Insanul Ahmed received a call from rapper Wale complaining that his latest album, The Gifted, had not been included on Complex's "50 Best Albums of 2013" list. A portion of the conversation was recorded and posted on the Complex website and on Complex TV on December 13. Wale could be heard threatening: "Get the security ready." According to Complex, Wale refused requests to meet, but he did post a humorous Instagram video that day which made light of the situation. Wale, later appearing on Hot97, said that his fall-out with Kid Cudi had something to do with the snub, and that he was not "begging Williamsburg hipsters" to like his music. Wale was referring to the October/November 2010 issue of Complex in which Kid Cudi said: "We don't fuck with you musically." The quote quickly went viral.

== See also ==
- Ego Trip
- Stüssy
- The Hundreds
- Vice Media
- Supreme
- Virgil Abloh
