= Trinidad James =

Trinidadian-American rapper

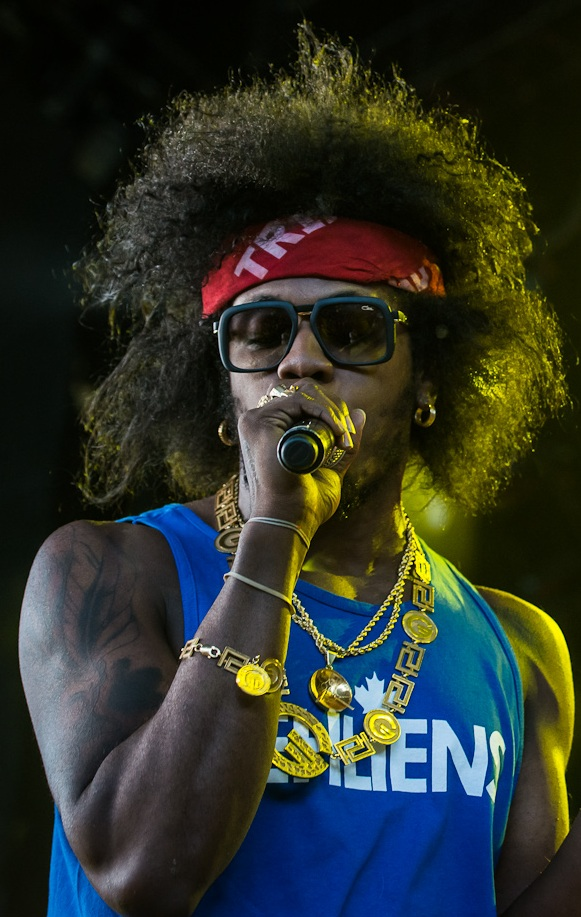
- James performing in 2013

Background information
- Born: Nicholaus Joseph Williams; September 24, 1987 (age 39); Port of Spain, Trinidad and Tobago
- Origin: Atlanta, Georgia, U.S.
- Genre: Hip-hop
- Occupations: Rapper; songwriter; music video director; podcaster
- Years active: 2011–present
- Labels: APG; Warner; Gold Gang; Think It's a Game (T.I.G.); Def Jam
- Website: trinidadjames.co

Nicholaus Joseph Williams (born September 24, 1987), better known by his stage name Trinidad James (often stylized as Trinidad Jame$), is a Trinidadian-American rapper, songwriter and music video director. In December 2012, he signed with Def Jam Recordings to commercially release his debut single, "All Gold Everything" that same month. The song peaked within the Top 40 of the Billboard Hot 100, received Platinum certification by the Recording Industry Association of America (RIAA), and spawned a remix featuring fellow Georgia-based rappers T.I., Jeezy and 2 Chainz. He was dropped from the label in 2014 after failing to release a debut album.

In the late 2010s, he shifted from recording to songwriting. He has been credited as a ghostwriter for releases by recording artists including City Girls, Kehlani, Flo Milli, Queen Naija, and Lakeyah. He co-wrote Mark Ronson's "Uptown Funk", Fifty Fifty's "Barbie Dreams", and Bhad Bhabie's "Hi Bich". He signed with Artist Publishing Group in 2018. Furthermore, he has directed music videos for the songs "Made for Me" by Muni Long and "Gas You Up" by Kaliii. Since 2018, he has hosted the Full Size Run Show, alongside Brendan Dunne and Matt Welty.

== Early life ==
Nicholaus Williams was born in Port of Spain, Trinidad and Tobago. His family moved to Canada and Florida before settling in the Bronx, New York City. As a child, he went to Catholic school. He has stated he cannot remember any parts of his life before the age of seven because of a head injury. In the eighth grade, he moved to Atlanta, where he began playing basketball. He began rapping in November 2011. He has listed Jay-Z, Cam'ron, T.I., and Young Jeezy as his influences.

== Career ==
In December 2012, James released his debut single, "All Gold Everything", which charted in the Top 40 of the US Billboard Hot 100. The song was taken from his debut mixtape, Don't Be S.A.F.E. (Sensitive As Fuck Everyday), which was released on July 31, 2012, and re-released with a music video on October 16, 2012. On December 13, 2012, it was announced James had signed a record contract with Def Jam Recordings worth approximately US$2 million. In January, Def Jam re-released Don't Be S.A.F.E to iTunes, which included the remix to "All Gold Everything" featuring 2 Chainz, T.I., and Young Jeezy. In the same month as his record deal signing, he made guest appearances on Gucci Mane's single "GuWop Nigga" and Wale's eighth mixtape Folarin. In February 2013, he would also make a guest appearance on Def Jam labelmate August Alsina's debut single, "I Luv This Shit", which became a hit on Rhythmic Contemporary radio, reached number thirteen on Hot R&B/Hip-Hop Songs, and number forty-eight on the Billboard Hot 100. This would later mark his final song to reach the latter chart to date. Later that year, he would perform alongside French Montana, ASAP Rocky, and Schoolboy Q for the remix of ASAP Ferg's single, "Work". Both features would receive platinum certification from the RIAA.

In August 2013, he announced and subsequently released his second mixtape, titled 10 PC Mild, through Def Jam and Think It's A Game Entertainment. The mixtape garnered generally mixed reviews, although many of whom considered it an improvement from his previous effort and praised the slew of guest performers which included Childish Gambino, Travis Scott, Fabo, Cyhi the Prynce, and Gucci Mane. After months of not releasing any new music, James announced that he had been dropped from Def Jam on August 1, 2014. He also indicated that instead of releasing his album through the label, he would make it available for free, and that the producers and rappers who contributed to the project should not expect any compensation because he had "no money." In April 2016, James released the single "Just a Lil' Thick (She Juicy)" featuring Mystikal and Lil Dicky. On December 31, 2016, James released a mixtape "The Wake Up 2" to streaming services such as Spotify and to mixtape websites alike.

On June 9, 2018, James released a single titled "M.M.M. (Marilyn Maryland Marilyn)" to streaming services. The music video, directed by Mike Marasco was uploaded to YouTube on the same day.

On November 27, 2019, in an interview with popular rap talk show "No Jumper", James stated that his current favorite rappers were "Doja Cat and Lil Nas X, I love those guys, partly because their flows remind me of myself" and later in the interview when asked about what his hopes for his current favorite rappers James proclaimed "I would hate to see them quit. You know. The last thing I'd want to see is for them to fall off just like I have."

Until the shows series finale in December 2023, James was a host on the YouTube talk show, Full Size Run. He appeared as himself in the Safdie Brothers' film Uncut Gems (2019).

== Discography ==
=== Mixtapes ===
List of mixtapes, with year released
Title	Details	Peak chart positions		
Title	Details	US	US R&B/HH	US Rap
Don't Be S.A.F.E.	Released: October 16, 2012; Label: Gold Gang; Format: Digital download	103	23	13
10 PC Mild	Released: August 13, 2013; Label: Gold Gang; Format: Digital download	—	—	—
The Wake Up EP	Released: January 3, 2015; Label: Gold Gang; Format Digital Download	—	—	—
No One Is Safe	Released: January 20, 2015; Label: Gold Gang; Format: Digital Download	—	—	—
Trips to Trinidad EP	Released: April 18, 2015; Label: Gold Gang; Format Digital Download	—	—	—
Trappy Mother's Day EP	Released: May 8, 2016; Label: Gold Gang; Format: Digital Download	—	—	—
The Wake Up 2	Released: December 31, 2016; Label: Gold Gang; Format: Digital Download	—	—	—
Father FiGGa	Released: July 28, 2017; Label: Gold Gang; Format: Digital Download	—	—	—
Daddy Issues	Released: October 31, 2018; Label: Gold Gang; Format: Digital download	—	—	—
Black Filter	Released: August 14, 2020; Label: Gold Gang; Format: Digital download	—	—	—
"—" denotes a recording that did not chart or was not released in that territory.

=== Singles ===
==== As lead artist ====
List of singles, with selected chart positions and certifications, showing year released and album name
Title	Year	Peak chart positions			Certifications	Album
Title	Year	US	US R&B/HH	US Rap	Certifications	Album
"All Gold Everything"	2012	36	9	6	RIAA: Platinum	Don't Be S.A.F.E.
"Females Welcomed"	2013	—	45	—		Don't Be S.A.F.E.
"Palm Trees" (featuring Cavie)	2015	—	—	—		Non-album single
"Just a Lil' Thick (She Juicy)" (featuring Mystikal and Lil Dicky)	2016	—	— (Note: "Just a Lil' Thick (She Juicy)" did not enter the Hot R&B/Hip-Hop Songs chart, but peaked at number two on the Bubbling Under R&B/Hip-Hop Singles chart.)	—	RIAA: Gold	Non-album single
"M.M.M. (Marilyn Maryland Marilyn)"	2018	—	—	—		Non-album single
"Get Up" (with Lion Babe)	2021	—	—	—		Rainbow Child
"—" denotes a recording that did not chart or was not released in that territory.

==== As featured artist ====
List of singles as featured performer, with selected chart positions and certifications, showing year released and album name
Title	Year	Peak chart positions			Certifications	Album
Title	Year	US	US R&B/HH	US Rap	Certifications	Album
"I Luv This Shit" (August Alsina featuring Trinidad James)	2013	48	13	—	RIAA: 2× Platinum; RMNZ: Platinum	Testimony
"Work (Remix)" (ASAP Ferg featuring ASAP Rocky, French Montana, Trinidad James, and Schoolboy Q)	2013	100	30	23	ARIA: Platinum; MC: Platinum; RIAA: 3× Platinum	Trap Lord
"Be Ok" (Earlly Mac featuring Trinidad James)	2015	—	—	—		Cousin Trap
"Don't Stop" (LunchMoney Lewis featuring Trinidad James)	2022	—	—	—		Non-album single
"—" denotes a recording that did not chart or was not released in that territory.

=== Guest appearances ===
List of non-single guest appearances, with other performing artists, showing year released and album name
Title	Year	Other artist(s)	Album
"GuWop Nigga"	2012	Gucci Mane	—N/a
"That Turn Up"	2012	Mike WiLL Made It	Est. In 1989 2.5
"Flat Out"	2012	Wale	Folarin
"Fukk Off"	2012	Grip Plyaz, Go Dreamer	Purp, Wind & Fire
"Fugginhudumarra"	2012	Grip Plyaz, Aleon Craft	Purp, Wind & Fire
"Jackie Joyner"	2012	Grip Plyaz, Aleon Craft	Purp, Wind & Fire
"M.O.E." (Remix)	2013	Cash Out	—N/a
"N.I.Y.S."	2013	Ducko McFli	—N/a
"I Can't Wait"	2013	Young Scooter	—N/a
"Who You Rollin' Wit"	2013	Mach Five	Art of Rap
"No Room"	2013	8Ball	Premro 2
"4 My Niggas"	2013	Travis Porter	Mr. Porter
"My Last Molly Song Ever I Promise"	2013	Problem, Gunplay	The Separation
"Purple Haze"	2013	Curren$y, Lloyd	New Jet City
"My Girl Pussy"	2013	Bangladesh	Ponzi Scheme
"Conversations On That Brown"	2013	Scotty	Faith
"Game"	2013	Scotty, Big K.R.I.T.	Faith
"My Trunk"	2013	Big K.R.I.T.	King Remembered In Time
"Pimp Scholar"	2013	Mach Five	We Ballin'
"On the Low"	2013	Logic, Kid Ink	Young Sinatra: Welcome to Forever
"Hoodrich Anthem" (HxV Remix)	2013	DJ Scream, 2 Chainz, Future, Waka Flocka Flame, Yo Gotti	The Ratchet Superior
"Killers"	2013	Curren$y	—N/a
"Groupie"	2013	Young Dro, B.o.B	Day Two
"Make It Mine"	2013	Kirko Bangz	Progression III
"FDB" (Remix)	2013	Young Dro, DJ Drama, T.I., French Montana	—N/a
"Pablo"	2013	Gucci Mane, E-40	Diary of a Trap God
"Make Ya Scream"	2013	Chevy Woods	Gang Land 2
"미친놈 (Success Crazed) Feat. Gray, Loco, Simon Dominic & Trinidad James"	2014	Jay Park	Evolution
"Uptown Funk" (Remix)	2015	Mark Ronson, Bruno Mars	Uptown Special
"The Gun"	2016	Cash Cash, Dev, Chrish	Blood, Sweat & 3 Years
"Amy"	2017	David Banner	The God Box
"Mission"	2019	Jaden	Erys

=== Music videos ===
List of music videos, with directors, showing year released
Title	Year	Director(s)
"Gold On My Macbook"	2012	Corey Davis
"All Gold Everything"	2012	Motion Family
"Southside" (featuring ForteBowie)	2013	Decatur Dan
"All Gold Everything" (Remix) (featuring T.I., Young Jeezy and 2 Chainz)	2013	Motion Family
"Females Welcomed"	2013	Jonathan Mannion
"Just A Lil' Thick (She Juicy)" (featuring Mystikal and Lil Dicky)	2016	Jon J
"M.M.M. (Marilyn Maryland Marilyn)"	2018	Mike Marasco
